= Vijay Television Awards =

Indian Tamil-language TV awards

- Logo of Vijay Television Awards 2015
- Awarded for: Achievements in television
- Date: 24 May 2014
- Site: Chennai
- Produced by: Pradeep Milroy Peter; R.Shekar; Venkatesh Ramachandran; Praveen Bennett; Sonali Sundararaj; Charu Roopa

Highlights
- Most awards: Saravanan Meenatchi Season 1 (6 awards)
- Most nominations: Airtel Super Singer

Television coverage
- Channel: Star Vijay
- Duration: 3 hours (approx.)

The Vijay Television Awards are an awards ceremony held to honour the cast and crew of Tamil television drama and other shows which air on Star Vijay in Tamil Nadu. It was established on 24 May 2014, and is held annually in the first half of year in Chennai.

== Nominations ==
Jurors select five nominees in each award category from among the shows that air on Star Vijay. The nominees are interviewed on Vijay TV and viewers are invited to cast their votes via text message or at the Vijay Television Awards website.

== Ceremonies ==
Year	Ceremony	Host	Ref
2014	1st Vijay Television Awards	Ma Ka Pa Anand, Jagan, Dhivyadharshini, Bhavana Balakrishnan	
2015	2rd Vijay Television Awards	Ma Ka Pa Anand, Bhavana Balakrishnan, Priya Bhavani Shankar, Kavin Raj, Jagan	
2017	3rd Vijay Television Awards	Ramya Subramanian, Kavin Raj	
2018	4th Vijay Television Awards	Dhivyadharshini, Ma Ka Pa Anand	
2019	5th Vijay Television Awards	Dhivyadharshini, Ma Ka Pa Anand	
2021	6th Vijay Television Awards	Dhivyadharshini, Ma Ka Pa Anand, Erode Mahesh, Priyanka Deshpande	
2021	7th Vijay Television Awards	Archana Chandhoke, Ma Ka Pa Anand, Erode Mahesh, Priyanka Deshpande	
2023	8th Vijay Television Awards	Nakshathra Nagesh, Ma Ka Pa Anand, Erode Mahesh and Priyanka Deshpande	
2024	9th Vijay Television Awards	Ma Ka Pa Anand Priyanka Deshpande	

== 1st Vijay Television Awards ==
The Vijay Television Awards 2014 ceremony took place on 24 May 2014 at YMCA Nandanam, Chennai, and was telecast during the second week of June 2014. The show was hosted by Ma Ka Pa Anand, Jagan, Dhivyadharshini and Bhavana Balakrishnan.

Guests included Sivakarthikeyan, Simran, Sangeetha, P. Vasu, D. Imman, Ambika, Radha and Yugi Sethu.

Saravanan Meenatchi won six awards, including, Favourite Actor Male and Favourite Actor Female for Senthil Kumar and Sreeja Chandran. Other winners were Office with four awards, Super Singer and Jodi Number One with three awards, Deivam Thandha Veedu, Neeya Naana and Athu Ithu Ethu with two awards, and Connexion with one award.

=== Winners (Fiction) ===
Favorite Serial
Saravanan Meenatchi and Deivam Thandha Veedu; 7C; Kana Kaanum Kaalangal; Office
Favorite onscreen pair	Favorite Comedian
Karthik Raj and Shruthi Raj – Office	Vishnu – Office
Favorite Actor Male	Favorite Actor Female
Senthil Kumar – Saravanan Meenatchi	Sreeja Chandran – Saravanan Meenatchi
Favorite supporting Actor Male	Favorite supporting Actor Female
Uday Mahesh – Office	Sudha Chandran – Deivam Thandha Veedu
Special jury Award	Favorite Find
Kuyili and Rajasekar – Saravanan Meenatchi	Madhumila – Office

=== Winners (Non-Fiction) ===
Favorite show	Favorite Talk show
Connexion	Neeya Naana
Favorite Reality Show	Pride of Vijay TV
Super Singer	Sivakarthikeyan
Favorite Singer Male	Favorite Singer Female
Hariharasudhan – Super Singer	Pooja Vaidyanath – Super Singer
Favorite judge Male	Favorite judge Female
Mano – Super Singer	K. S. Chithra – Super Singer
Favorite dancer Male	Favorite dancer Female
Sathish Krishnan – Jodi Number One	Gabriella Charlton – Jodi Number One Season 6
Favorite Junior	Favorite comedian
Alka Ajith – Super Singer Junior	Robo Shankar – Athu Ithu Ethu
Favorite International Find	Favorite comedy team
Pragathi Guruprasad – Super Singer Junior season 3; Mathialagan - Thayumanavan	Athu Ithu Ethu (Siricha pochu team)
Favorite Anchor Male	Favorite Anchor Female
Gopinath Chandran – Neeya Naana	Dhivyadharshini
Favorite Entertainer	Elegant Lady of Vijay television(special award)
Ma Ka Pa Anand	Radha
Special Award	Special Honorary Award
Ananth Vaidyanathan – Super Singer	Yugi Sethu

== 2nd Vijay Television Awards ==
The second edition of Vijay Television Awards 2025 was held on 19 September 2015 at Nehru Indoor Stadium in Chennai. The award function was hosted by the anchors Ma Ka Pa Anand, Bhavana Balakrishnan, Priya Bhavani Shankar, Kavin Raj and Jagan.

Saravanan Meenatchi season 2 won four awards, including, Favorite Serial, Favorite Comedian, Favourite Actor Male and Favourite Actor Female for Myna Nandhini, Kavin Raj and Rachitha Mahalakshmi. Other winners were Deivam Thandha Veedu and Andal Azhagar with three awards.

=== Winners (Fiction) ===
Favorite Serial
Saravanan Meenatchi
Favorite Director	Favorite Comedian
Praveen Bennet and Brama	Myna Nandhini - Saravanan Meenatchi season 2
Favorite Actor Male	Favorite Actor Female
Kavin Raj - Saravanan Meenatchi season 2	Rachitha Mahalakshmi - Saravanan Meenatchi season 2
Favorite supporting Actor Male	Favorite supporting Actor Female
Stalin - Andal Azhagar	Kuyili - Kalyanam Mudhal Kadhal Varai
Favorite Villain	Favorite Marumagal
Kavya - Deivam Thandha Veedu	Meghna Vincent - Deivam Thandha Veedu
Favorite Maamiyar	Favorite Family
Sudha Chandran - Deivam Thandha Veedu	Collector Family - Andal Azhagar
Favorite Promo	Favorite Find
Andal Azhagar	Madhumila
Favorite on screen pair	Best BGM
Karthik Raj and Sruthi Raj - Office	Ilayavan - Office

=== Winners (Non-Fiction) ===
Favorite Game Show	Favorite Talk show
Connexion	Koffee With DD
Favorite Reality Show	Pride of Vijay TV
Super Singer Junior	Ma Ka Pa Anand
Favorite Singer Male	Favorite Judge Female
Sathya Prakash - Ammadi Un Azhagu (Vellaikaara Durai)	Radha - Jodi Number One
Favorite Judge Male	Favorite Judge Panel
Srinivas	Kitchen Super Star
Favorite Choreographer	Voice of Vjay TV Award
Sheriff	Gopi and GG
Favorite Comedian	Favorite International Find
Amudhavaanan and Vadivel Balaji	Jessica Judes
Favorite Anchor Male	Favorite Anchor Female
Gopinath Chandran - Neeya Naana and Back to School	Dhivyadharshini - Koffee With DD
Favorite Anchor Pair	Favorite Promo
Ma Ka Pa Anand and Bhavana - Super Singer	Super Singer Junior - Wildcard Promo
Special Award	Special Award
Kalyani	Ramya

== 3rd Vijay Television Awards ==
The third edition of Vijay Television Awards 2017 was held after 2 years on 6 May 2017 at Nehru Indoor Stadium in Chennai. The award function was hosted by the anchors Ramya Subramanian and Kavin Raj. The show aired 21 May 2017.

Saravanan Meenatchi season 3 won six awards, including, Favorite Serial, Favorite Director, Favorite Comedian, Favorite supporting Actor Female, Favorite Find Male and Favourite Actor Female for Praveen Bennet, Myna Nandhini, Rio Raj and Rachitha Mahalakshmi. Other winners were Mappillai with four awards, including, Favorite supporting Actor Male, Favorite Maamiyar, Favorite Pair.

=== Winners (Fiction) ===
Favorite Serial
Saravanan Meenatchi season 3
Favorite Director	Favorite Comedian
Praveen Bennet - Saravanan Meenatchi season 3	Myna Nandhini - Saravanan Meenatchi season 3
Favorite Actor Male	Favorite Actor Female
Amit Bhargav - Kalyanam Mudhal Kadhal Varai	Rachitha Mahalakshmi - Saravanan Meenatchi season 3
Favorite supporting Actor Male	Favorite supporting Actor Female
S. Rajasekar - Mappillai	Gayathri Yuvraaj - Saravanan Meenatchi season 3
Favorite Villain	Favorite Mom
Kavitha - Neeli	Sindhu Shyam - Pagal Nilavu
Favorite Maamiyar	Favorite Family
Sabitha Anand - Mappillai	Pagal Nilavu
Favorite Promo	Favorite Find Male
Andal Azhagar	Rio Raj - Saravanan Meenatchi season 3
Favorite Find Female	Favorite Dad
Sameera Sherief - Pagal Nilavu	S. Rajasekar - Mappillai
Favorite Pair	Favorite Child Artist
Senthil Kumar & Sreeja - Mappillai	Chavi Sharma - Neeli

=== Winners (Non-Fiction) ===
Favorite Show'	Favorite Singer Male
Kalakka Povathu Yaaru 7	Rajaganapthy
Favorite Reality Show	Favorite Comedian Pair
Kings of Dance	Pugazh & Aranthangi Nisha
Favorite Anchor Male	Favorite Comedian Male
Ma Ka Pa Anand	Dheena
Favorite Anchor Pair	Favorite Anchor Female
Erode Mahesh & Thaadi Balaji	Priyanka Deshpande
Favorite Dancer Female	Favorite Promo
Sunitha Gogoi	Super Singer Junior - Wildcard Promo
Pride Of The Channel	Favorite Dancer Male
Robo Shankar	Ma Ka Pa Anand
Favorite Comedy Team	
Siricha Pochu (Athu Ithu Ethu)	

== 4th Vijay Television Awards ==
The 4th Vijay Television Awards is an awards ceremony for excellence in Star Vijay Television. It was held on 6 May and 13 May 2018 on Sunday at 15:00 (IST). It was hosted by Sharanya Turadi Sundarraj, Azhar and Dhivyadharshini.

Chinna Thambi and Raja Rani 1 won three awards, Other winners were Nenjam Marappathillai and Saravanan Meenatchi season 3 with two awards.

=== Winners ===
Best Serial	Pride of Chennai
Raja Rani 1	Bigg Boss
Favorite Actor Male	Favorite Actor Female
Sanjeev Karthick - Raja Rani 1	Alya Manasa - Raja Rani 1
Best Crew and Team	Best Find Of The Year
Chinna Thambi	Sharanya Turadi Sundarraj - Nenjam Marappathillai
Best Villain	Best Budding Pair
Dr. Sharmila - Pagal Nilavu	Shivani Narayanan & Mohammed Azeem - Pagal Nilavu
Best Comedian	100 Dedication Award
Rajkumar Manoharan - Saravanan Meenatchi season 3	Rachitha Mahalakshmi - Saravanan Meenatchi season 3
Best Pair	Best Family
Prajin & Pavani Reddy - Chinna Thambi	Nenjam Marappathillai
Best Mother	
Anila Sreekumar - Chinna Thambi	

== 5th Vijay Television Awards ==
The fifth edition of Vijay Television Awards 2019 was at EVP film city on 6 April 2019. The event was hosted by anchors Dhivyadharshini and Ma Ka Pa Anand. The popular fiction show couple Raja Rani 1 fame Sanjeev Karthick and Alya Manasa had a surprising engagement day on the sets of Vijay Television awards. The show was aired from 28 April 2019 on Sunday at 15:30(IST).

=== Winners ===
Best Serial	Best Family Show
Mouna Raagam	Pandian Stores
Best Hero	Best Heroine
Mirchi Senthil - Naam Iruvar Namakku Iruvar S1	Alya Manasa - Raja Rani S1
Best Mother	Best Daughter
Pragathi - Aranmanai Kili	Mounika Devi - Avalum Naanum
Best Child Award	Best Son
Sherine Farhana - Mouna Raagam S1	Prajin - Chinna Thambi
Best Budding Pair	Best Jodi
Pavithra & Dhiraviam Rajakumaran - Eeramana Rojave	Sanjeev Karthick & Alya Manasa - Raja Rani S1
Best Supporting Actor Award	Best Find of the Year
Sujitha - Pandian Stores	Darshan & Monisha - Aranmanai Kili
Best Villain	Best Marumagal
Shanoor Sana Begum - Ponmagal Vanthal	Rashmi Jayraj - Naam Iruvar Namakku Iruvar S1
Favourite Jodi	Best Couples
Senthil Kumar & Raksha Holla - Naam Iruvar Namakku Iruvar S1	Amit Bhargav & Sharanya Turadi Sundarraj - Nenjam Marappathillai
Best Comedian	Best Writer
Shabnam - Raja Rani S1	Priya Thambi - Pandian Stores
Senthil Kumar & Raksha Holla - Naam Iruvar Namakku Iruvar S1	Amit Bhargav & Sharanya Turadi Sundarraj - Nenjam Marappathillai
Best Director	Best Dialogue
Thai Selvam - Mouna Raagam S1 and Naam Iruvar Namakku Iruvar S1	E. Chandrasekar & K Jayaprakash - Naam Iruvar Namakku Iruvar S1

=== Winners (Non-Fiction) ===
- Non Stop Comedy – Aranthangi Nisha
- Best Pair of Anchor – Ma Ka Pa Anand and Priyanka Deshpande
- Best Anchor – Rio Raj

== 6th Vijay Television Awards ==
The 6th Vijay Television Awards is an awards ceremony for excellence in Star Vijay Television. It was held on 18 April 2021 on Sunday at 15:00 (IST). It was hosted by Dhivyadharshini and Ma Ka Pa Anand.

Bharathi Kannamma won five awards, including, Best Hero, Best Heroine, Best Mamiyaar, Best Female in Negative Role, Best Director for Arun Prasad, Roshini Haripriyan, Roopa Sree, Farina Azad and Praveen Bennet. Other winners were Cooku with Comali season 2 with three awards, including, Best Reality Show, Best Comedian for Pugazh and Trending Pair for Ashwin Kumar Lakshmikanthan and Sivaangi Krishnakumar.

== 7th Vijay Television Awards ==
The award function was hosted by Archana Chandhoke, Ma Ka Pa Anand, Erode Mahesh and Priyanka Deshpande. It was telecasted on 24 April 2022.

Baakiyalakshmi won the most awards with 5 in total, Best Actress went to Suchitra, Best Prime-Time serial, Best Supporting Actress went to Reshma Pasupuleti, Best Villain (Sathish), Best Father (Rosary), Best Director (David) and Best Writer (Priya Thambi).

Thendral Vanthu Ennai Thodum came second with 3 awards, which were Best Male and Female Performers going to Vinoth Babu and Pavithra Janani for their roles as Vetri and Abhi, Best Non Prime-time Serial as well as Best Non-Prime Time Director for Abdul Hafeez.

== 8th Vijay Television Awards ==
Vijay Television Awards
- No. of episodes: 2

Release
- Original network: Star Vijay
- Original release: 14 May – 21 May 2023
- Presented by: Nakshathra Nagesh; Ma Ka Pa Anand; Erode Mahesh; Priyanka Deshpande

Season chronology
- ← Previous; Vijay Television Awards 2022 Next → Vijay Television Awards 2024

This time around, Star Vijay opted to telecast the awards in two parts, the first part being aired on 14 May and the second part to be aired on 21 May 2023. The hosts this time around were Nakshathra Nagesh, Ma Ka Pa Anand, Erode Mahesh and Priyanka Deshpande.

Baakiyalakshmi swept the awards yet again, along with Eeramana Rojave 2 with three awards each going to them. Baakiyalakshmi won Favourite Primetime Serial, Best Villain for Reshma Pasupuleti and Best Heroine for Suchitra. Eeramana Rojave 2 also won 3 awards as well, with Gabriella Charlton and Siddarth Kumaran winning Best Pair, Swathi Konde winning Find of the Year for a female actress, as well as a posthumous award given to Eeramana Rojave 2 director Thai Selvam for best prime-time director.

Thendral Vandhu Ennai Thodum won two awards, with Best Supporting Actress going to Tharshika and Auditor Sridhar winning Best Father awards respectively; as well as Pandian Stores with two - Venkat Renganathan for his role as Jeeva in Pandian Stores and Saravanan Vickram for Supporting Hero. Muthuzhagu won best non prime-time serial, Ma Ka Pa Anand and Priyanka Deshpande won Best Anchor awards for their respective genders.

Erode Mahesh was also given a special award for his immense 15 year commitment to Star Vijay.

=== Best category Awards Winner ===
Best Serial	Best Serial Afternoon
Baakiyalakshmi; Pandian Stores; Raja Rani 2; Bharathi Kannamma	Muthazhagu; Thendral Vandhu Ennai Thodum
Best Hero	Best Heroine
Venkat Renganathan – Pandian Stores; Swaminathan – Kaatrukkenna Veli; Arnav – Chellamma; Vinoth Babu – Thendral Vanthu Ennai Thodum; Aashish Chakravarthi – Muthazhagu; Deepak Dinkar – Thamizhum Saraswathiyum; Siddharth Kumaran – Eeramana Rojave 2; Sidhu Sid – Raja Rani 2; Arun Prasad – Bharathi Kannamma; Dhiraviyam Rajakumaran – Eeramana Rojave 2	K. S. Suchitra Shetty – Baakiyalakshmi
Best Supporting Actor Male	Best Supporting Actor Female
Saravanan Vickram – Pandian Stores; Navin Vetri – Thamizhum Saraswathiyum; Bhanu Prakash – Kaatrukkenna Veli; Sabari – Bharathi Kannamma; Rahul Ramachandran – Mouna Raagam 2; Balaji Thiyagarajan Dayalan – Raja Rani 2	Tharshika – Thendral Vanthu Ennai Thodum; Dharshna - Thamizhum Saraswathiyum
Best Pair Fiction	Best Pair Non - Fiction
Siddharth Kumaran & Gabriella Charlton – Eeramana Rojave 2; Pavithra Janani & Vinoth Babu - Thendral Vanthu Ennai Thodum	Madurai Muthu & Ramar
Find of the year Fiction	Find of the year Non - Fiction
Swathi Konde – Eeramana Rojave 2	Shivin Ganesan – Bigg Boss 6
Best Comedian Fiction	Favorite Comedian Non-Fiction
Kasthuri – Baakiyalakshmi	Kuraishi – Cooku with Comali season 4
Best Son	Best Child Artist
VJ Vishal – Baakiyalakshmi	Kanmani – Chellamma
Best Daughter-in-law	Best Mother
Shobana – Muthuzhagu; Pavithra Janani – Thendral Vanthu Ennai Thodum; Nakshatra Nagesh – Thamizhum Saraswathiyum; Ashwini Aanandita – Namma Veetu Ponnu; Riya Vishwanathan – Raja Rani 2; Dharshna Sripal Golecha – Thamizhum Saraswathiyum	Roopa Sree – Bharathi Kannamma 2
Best Director Afternoon	Best Director
Abdul Kabeez – Thendral Vanthu Ennai Thodum	ThaaiSelvam – Eeramana Rojave 2
Best Negative Role	Budding Young Pair
Reshma Pasupuleti – Baakiyalakshmi	Priyanka & Swaminathan – Kaatrukkenna Veli
Favorite Show	Favorite Singer
Oo Solriya Oo Oohm Solriya	Rakshita Suresh
Dhool Moment Award	Best DOP
DJ Black	Saravanan – Thendral Vanthu Ennai Thodum
Best Anchor Male	Best Anchor Female
Ma Ka Pa Anand	Priyanka Deshpande
Best Dubbing Artist	Special Award
Meenalochani	Erode Mahesh (15 Years Journey in Vijay TV)

== 9th Vijay Television Awards ==
The 9th Vijay Television Awards ceremony honoured the best Vijay Television shows released in 2023. The ceremony was held on 2024 and broadcast on Star Vijay on 1 September 2024. The show opted to telecast the awards in two parts, the first part being aired on 1 September and the second part to be aired on 8 September 2024 on Sunday at 15:00 (IST). Ma Ka Pa Anand and Priyanka Deshpande is the host for this season.

=== Winners ===
Best Serial	1000 Episodes Special Award
Siragadikka Aasai	Baakiyalakshmi
Best Hero	Best Heroine
Vetri Vasanth - Siragadikka Aasai	Gomathi Priya - Siragadikka Aasai
Best Mother	Best Father
Nirosha - Pandian Stores 2	Stalin Muthu - Pandian Stores 2
Best Mamiyar	Best Mamanar
Anila Sreekumar - Siragadikka Aasai	R. Sundarrajan - Siragadikka Aasai
Find of the year Actor Male	Find of the year Actor Female
Navin Kumar - Chinna Marumagal	Swetha - Chinna Marumagal
Best Supporting Actor Male	Best Supporting Actor Female
Sri Deva - Siragadikka Aasai	Salma Arun - Siragadikka Aasai
Best Budding Pair	Best Pair
Prem Jacob & Varshini Suresh - Nee Naan Kaadhal	Swaminathan & Lakshmi Priya - Mahanathi
Best Child Award	Favourite Family
Vedhasya - Ponni	Pandian Stores 2
Best Thatha	Best Patti
S. T. P. Rosario - Baakiyalakshmi	Revathy - Siragadikka Aasai
Best son	Best Marumagal
Vikram Shri - Aaha Kalyanam	Akshaya Kandamuthan - Aaha Kalyanam
Best Director	Best Director Non Prime Time
S. Kumaran - Siragadikka Aasai	Vel Raj - Chellamma
Best Dialogue	Special Award
Priya Thampy - Pandian Stores 2 and Baakiyalakshmi	Deepak Dinkar
Favourite Reality Show	Best Game Show
Super Singer 9	Start Music season 5
Best Anchor Male	Best Anchor Female
Rio Raj	Priyanka Deshpande
Entertainer Of The Year	Trending Pair Non Fiction
Ma Ka Pa Anand	KPY Bala and Aranthangi Nisha
Best Comedy Show	Best Villain
Athu Ithu Ethu	Naveen Muralidharan

== 10th Vijay Television Awards ==
The 10th Vijay Television Awards ceremony honoured the best Vijay Television shows released in 2024 and 2025. The ceremony was held on 31 August 2025 and broadcast on Star Vijay on 14 September 2025. The show opted to telecast the awards in two parts, the first part being aired on 14 September and the second part to be aired on 21 September 2025 on Sunday at 15:00 (IST). Ma Ka Pa Anand and Priyanka Deshpande is the host for this season.

=== Winners ===
Best Serial	1000 Episodes Special Award
Siragadikka Aasai	Baakiyalakshmi
Best Hero	Best Heroine
Vetri Vasanth - Siragadikka Aasai	Gomathi Priya - Siragadikka Aasai
Best Mother	Best Father
Nirosha - Pandian Stores 2	Stalin Muthu - Pandian Stores 2
Best Mamiyar	Best Mamanar
Anila Sreekumar - Siragadikka Aasai	R. Sundarrajan - Siragadikka Aasai
Find of the year Actor Male	Find of the year Actor Female
Aravinth Seiju - Ayyanar Thunai	Madhumitha Hirannaiah - Ayyanar Thunai
Best Character Actor Male	Best Character Actor Female
Munaf Rahman - Ayyanar Thunai	Salma Arun - Siragadikka Aasai
Best Budding Pair	Best Pair
Akash Premkumar & Shalini Prabhu - Pandian Stores 2	Swaminathan & Lakshmi Priya - Mahanathi
Best Child Award	Favourite Family
Vedhasya - Ponni	Pandian Stores 2
Best Thatha	Best Patti
S. T. P. Rosario - Baakiyalakshmi	Revathy - Siragadikka Aasai
Best son	Best Marumagal
Vikram Shri - Aaha Kalyanam	Akshaya Kandamuthan - Aaha Kalyanam
Best Director	Best Director Non Prime Time
S. Kumaran - Siragadikka Aasai	Vel Raj - Chellamma
Best Dialogue	Special Award
Priya Thampy - Pandian Stores 2 and Baakiyalakshmi	Deepak Dinkar
Favourite Reality Show	Best Game Show
Super Singer 9	Start Music season 5
Best Anchor Male	Best Anchor Female
Rio Raj	Priyanka Deshpande
Entertainer Of The Year	Trending Pair Non Fiction
Ma Ka Pa Anand	KPY Bala and Aranthangi Nisha
Best Comedy Show	Best Villain
Athu Ithu Ethu	Naveen Muralidharan

== See also ==
- List of Asian television awards
- Vijay Awards
- Tamil Nadu State Film Awards
- International Tamil Film Awards
- Filmfare Awards South
- Cinema Express Awards
- Sun Kudumbam Awards (Tamil Television Awards)
