= Soundarya Bala Nandakumar =

Singer and actress

- Other name: Soundarya Nandakumar
- Occupations: Singer; actress
- Years active: 2010–present

Soundarya Bala Nandakumar is an Indian singer and actress, who works in Tamil television and films. She is known for playing Revathy in the soap opera, Pagal Nilavu (9 May 2016 – 9 March 2019).

== Career ==
=== Singing ===
In 2010, Soundarya made her television debut as a contestant in Super Singer 3. She debuted as a singer with the film 6 Meluguvarthigal (2013). In 2015, she debuted as one of the lead actress in the television series Pagal Nilavu after the makers of the series saw her performance in Super Singer. She garnered acclaim for her role as Revathy in the series, which went on to run for almost 700 episodes. In 2016, she took part in the Super Singer 5 Mini Series. Soundarya was featured singing "Thendral Vanthu" in Kabali (2016). She had previously sung that song on Super Singer. Her next song was "Kalavani" in Kodiveeran, which she co-sang with VV Prasanna. In The Times of India review of the film's soundtrack, the reviewer wrote that "A folk duet, Prasanna and Soundarya shine in this one".

=== Acting ===
In 2018, Syed Anwar and Sameera Sherief left Pagal Nilavu. Soundarya told The Times of India how she influenced the makers of the series to give her more screen time. Later that year, Soundarya and Vignesh Karthick left the series as it was hard to continue the series without two of the main characters. That same year, she starred with Vignesh Karthick, her Pagal Nilavu co-star in the short film Yours Shamefully, which became viral upon release. The team of the Master saw the short and subsequently signed Soundarya to play a role in the film.

== Filmography ==
Key
†	Denotes films that have not yet been released

=== Films ===
Year	Film	Role	Ref.
2016	Kabali	Pub singer	
2021	Master	College professor	
2021	Vanakkam Da Mappilei	Preeti	
2021	Thittam Irandu	Pallavi	
2021	Yennanga Sir Unga Sattam	Akshaya Ramanujam	
2023	Sync	Madhu	

=== Television ===
Year	Film	Role	Channel	Notes	Ref.
2010 - 2011	Super Singer 3	Contestant	Star Vijay		
2014	Super Singer 4	Contestant	Star Vijay		
2016 - 2018	Pagal Nilavu	Revathy	Star Vijay		
2016	Super Singer 5	Contestant	Star Vijay	Appears on Mini Series and Live Grand Finale	
2019	Bigg Boss Tamil 3	Guest	Star Vijay	Appears on Day 100	
2020	Start Music season 2	Contestant	Star Vijay	Episode 4	
2021	Pudhu Pudhu Arthangal	Bharathi	Zee Thamizh	Mega Thirumana Vaibhavam	
2024	Super Singer 10	Guest performer	Star Vijay	Appeared in Isai Puyil Hits Round	

=== Short films ===
Year	Film	Role	Ref.
2018	Yours Shamefully	Pallavi	
2018	Pesuvadhu Kiliya Pennazhagu Mozhiya	Shwetha	
2019	Yours Shamefully 2: Dhev Diya	Diya	
2020	Yours Shamefully 2.5 Reloaded	Saranya	

== Discography ==
Year	Film	Song	Lyricist	Music Director	Ref.
2013	6	"Aagaayam Bhoomikellam", "Bigulu Bigulu"	V. Z. Durai	Srikanth Deva	
2017	Kodiveeran	"Kalavani"	Mohan Rajan	N. R. Raghunanthan	
2021	Bhoomi	"Achamillai Achamillai"	Madhan Karky	D. Imman	
2022	Nadhi	"Katheri Poovasam"	Yugabharathi	Dhibu Ninan Thomas	
2022	Iravin Nizhal	"Kaayam"	R. Parthiban	A. R. Rahman	
2024	Lal Salaam	"Ther Thiruvizha" (additional vocals)	Vivek	A. R. Rahman	

== Awards and nominations ==
Year	Award	Category	Result	Notes	Ref.
2017	Vijay Television Awards	Vijay Television Awards for Favourite Actress	Nominated		
2017	Vijay Television Awards	Vijay Television Awards for Favourite Screen Pair	Nominated	Nominated with Vignesh Karthick	
2018	Vijay Television Awards	Vijay Television Awards for Favourite Actress	Nominated		
2018	Vijay Television Awards	Vijay Television Awards for Favourite Screen Pair	Nominated	Nominated with Vignesh Karthick	
