= Saravanan Meenatchi =

Indian television series

- Genre: Family drama Romantic comedy
- Screenplay by: Priya Thambi
- Directed by: Azhagar (season 1); Praveen Bennett (season 2–3)
- Starring: Senthil Kumar; Sreeja Chandran; Rachitha Mahalakshmi; Mohammad Irfan; Kavin; Rio Raj
- Theme music composer: Ilayavan
- Opening theme: Yelelo - Saravanan Meenatchi
- Country of origin: India
- Original language: Tamil
- No. of seasons: 3
- No. of episodes: 1765

Production
- Producers: Syed Anwar Ahmed & Venkatesh Ramachandran (S2&3)
- Cinematography: R Saravanan
- Editor: PM Achuthan
- Running time: 20–22 minutes 42 minutes
- Production companies: Evergreen Productions & Global Villagers

Original release
- Network: Vijay TV
- Release: 12 September 2011 – 17 August 2018

Related
- Saravanan Meenatchi (season 2); Saravanan Meenatchi (season 3)

Saravanan Meenatchi is a 2011 Indian Tamil-language television series broadcast on STAR Vijay. The first season was broadcast from 12 September 2011 to 18 October 2013. The second season of the show, which started as a sequel and next generation story of the first season, was broadcast from 21 October 2013 to 15 July 2016. The third season featured a different story and cast and was broadcast from 18 July 2016 to 17 August 2018.

== Casting ==
Season 1

The name of the serial is derived from the names of the characters of the serial 'Madurai' starring the same lead pair.

== Series ==
=== Overview ===
Season	Episodes	Originally aired		Time
Season	Episodes	First aired	Last aired	Time
1	480	12 September 2011	18 October 2013	Monday – Friday; 8:30PM (IST)
2	710	21 October 2013	15 July 2016	Monday – Saturday; 8:30PM (IST)
3	575	18 July 2016	17 August 2018	Monday – Friday; 8:30PM (IST)

== Synopsis ==
=== Season 1 ===
The story revolves around Saravanan (Senthil Kumar) and Meenatchi (Sreeja Chandran) who are poles apart in terms of personality, background, attitudes towards life, etc. Saravanan is a Chennai-based radio jockey from an affluent family. Meenatchi is a small-town girl from Thirunelveli, working as a teacher in a small school. The story begins as the two families meet for a marriage proposal between the two, but things go wrong and the wedding does not happen. However, Saravanan and Meenatchi find themselves falling in love with each other. The energetic spirit with which the couple handle love, marriage and life in general leads the rest of the story.

=== 20 years later ===
Season 2 begins with Shakthi Saravanan (Mohammad Irfan), son of Saravanan and Meenatchi, coming to India from Canada to find a bride like his mom. He comes to his mom's village Kallidaikurichi in Tirunelveli where his maternal uncle, Tamizh (Meenatchi's elder brother), and family live. Shakthi Saravanan disguises himself and lives in Tamizh's house where he meets Tamizh's daughter, Thanga Meenatchi (Rachitha Mahalakshmi) a.k.a. "Meenatchi", and falls for her. After all opposition from Tamizh, ultimately she too falls for Shakthi Saravanan. Tamizh is strongly against Thanga Meenatchi and Sakthi Saravanan's love due to tensions between the families in the previous generation. Because of this, Tamizh decides to marry his daughter Thanga Meenatchi to his other sister Sudha's son Saravana Perumal (Kavin) a.k.a. Vettaiyan (Shakthi Saravanan's cousin brother).

Shakthi Saravanan promises to save Thanga Meenatchi from the wedding and Vettaiyan promises not to marry her if Saravanan comes. Unfortunately, Saravanan never shows up (he gets deported back to Canada because of his visa expiration) and Vettiyan and Meenatchi get married. Meenatchi develops a strong hatred towards Vettiyan because of this sudden marriage. Meenatchi meets a guy at her college named Inba who promises to take her to Canada to meet Saravanan. His real intention is to kidnap her and rape her. Vettaiyan saves Meenatchi from Inba and his gang, and Vettaiyan himself promises Meenatchi that he will take her to Canada and unite her with Saravanan. They get really close and Meenatchi starts developing feelings for Vettaiyan without even realizing it. Although Meenatchi develops feelings for Vettaiyan, she tries to decline it.

She decides to break ties with Vettaiyan if she wants to live with Saravanan. When Thanga Meenatchi is on the way to the temple to break all ties with Vettaiyan, she meets with an accident and loses her memory.

Thanga Meenatchi meets Vettaiyan again and starts to develop feelings for him not remembering their marriage or her previous love with Shakthi Saravanan. Vettaiyan and Meenatchi start dating, and Vettaiyan hides the truth about Saravanan from Meenatchi. Soon Meenatchi gets to know that Vettaiyan is her husband and goes home to happily live with him.

Then she learns about her past with Shakthi Saravanan and is angry with Vettaiyan. After learning more about the sacrifices and hardships Vettaiyan faced for and because of her, she heartily accepts him and they start to live together. After a few months, they bump into a lady who shares Meenatchi's name and appearance, beginning season 3.

=== Season 3 ===
Love blossoms between a simple middle-class boy Saravanan (Rio Raj) and a rich girl Meenatchi (Rachitha Mahalakshmi), an MBA graduate from London. Despite the differences in their background, Saravanan and Meenakshi get married and lead a happy life together.

== Cast ==
=== Season 1 ===
- Mirchi Senthil as RJ Saravanan - Rajasekhar and Sharadha's son; Meenatchi's husband and Shakthi Saravanan's father (2011-2013)
- Sreeja Chandran as Meenatchi - Vaidyanathan and Valli's daughter; Saravanan's wife and Shakthi Saravanan's mother (2011-2013)
- Stalin Muthu as Thamizharasan "Thamizh" - Vaidyanathan and Valli's son; Meenatchi's elder brother and Soundarya's husband, Vaitheeswaran and Thanga Meenatchi's father (2011-2013)
- Ramya Ramakrishna as Soundarya - Rajasekhar and Sharadha's daughter; Saravanan's elder sister and Thamizh's wife, Vaitheeswaran and Thanga Meenatchi's mother (2011-2013)
- S. Rajasekar as Rajasekar - Soundarya and Saravanan's father (2011-2013)
- Kuyili as Sharadha Rajasekhar - Rajasekhar's wife; Soundarya and Saravanan's mother (2011-2016)
- Y. V. Subramaniam as Vaidhyanathan - Thamizh, Meenatchi Sudha and Ramya's father (2011-2013)
- Viji Kannan as Valli Vaidyanathan - Vaidhyanathan's wife; Thamizh, Meenatchi Sudha and Ramya's mother (2011-2013)
- Margaret Divya as Yamini - Saravanan's ex-girlfriend (2011-2013)
- Suchitra as Sudha - Vaidhyanathan and Valli's daughter; Thamizh and Meenatchi's first younger sister and Murugan's wife, Vettaiyan's mother (2011-2013)
- Kavin as Murugan - Sudha's husband and Vettaiyan's father (2011-2013)
- Sathya Sai Krishna (2011) / Shamili Sukumar (2012-2013) as Ramya - Vaidhyanathan and Valli's daughter Thamizh and Meenatchi's second younger sister and Jeeva's wife
- Syed Anwar Ahmed as Jeeva - Ramya's husband (2011-2013)
- S. N. Lakshmi as Aachi - Vaidhyanathan's mother; Thamizh, Meenatchi Sudha and Ramya's grandmother (2011-2012)
- Raghavan as IPS Arunachalam - Thamizh's best friend and Meenatchi's ex-fiance (2011-2013)
- Sangeetha as Amudha (2011-2012)
- Rajkumar as Subramani - a man who loves Meenatchi one-sidedly (2011-2012)
- Manoj Kumar as Arjun - Ramya's ex-lover (2012)
- Mirchi Shah as Shah - Saravanan's best friend (2011-2013)
- Suzane George as Malliga - Thamizh's ex-girlfriend (2012)
- Gayatri Bhuvanesh as Akilandeshwari (2012)
- Krithika Laddu (2012)
- Subhashini Kannan (2012)
- Swarupa as Saravanan's Friend Mano

=== Season 2 ===
- Kavin as Saravana Perumal alias Vettaiyan - Sudha and Murugan's son, Shakthi Saravanan's cousin brother and Thanga Meenatchi's husband, Kalai 's friend (2013-2016)
- Rachitha Mahalakshmi as Thanga Meenatchi "Meenatchi" - Thamizh and Soundarya's daughter; Shakthi Saravanan's ex-lover and Vettaiyan's wife (2013-2016)
- Irfan (2013-2014) as Shakthi Saravanan - Saravanan and Meenatchi's son; Thanga Meenatchi's ex-lover
  - Prem Kumar (2014-2015) as Shakthi Saravanan
- V. J. Chitra as Kalaiyarasi "Kalai" - Vettaiyan's friend (2014-2016)
- Myna Nandhini as Revathi alias "Mynaa" - Thanga Meenatchi's best friend (2013-2016)
- RJ Priya as Priya - Arunachalam's daughter, Shakthi Saravanan's friend and loves him one-sidedly (2013-2015)
- Deepa Nethran as Sudha - Vettaiyan's mother (2013-2016)
- Kumara Moorthi as Douglas Vettaiyan's best friend (2013-2016)
- Alagesh as Thamizh - Vaitheeswaran and Thanga Meenatchi's father (2013-2016)
- Lakshmi Vasudevan / Sri Latha as Soundharya Vaitheeswaran and Thanga Meenatchi's mother (2013-2016)
- Siddharth Kumaran as Vaitheeswaran - Thanga Meenatchi's elder brother; Janani's ex-lover and Tulasi's husband (2013-2016)
- Divya Prabhu (2013-2015) / Pavithra Janani (2015-2016) as in a dual Role
  - Janani - Anbuarasan's elder daughter, Vaitheeswaran's ex- lover (2013-2015) (Dead)
  - Tulasi - Anbuarasan's younger daughter, Janani's twin and Vaitheeswaran's wife (2015-2016)
- Karthik as Pandi - a man who loves Thanga Meenatchi one-sidedly (2013-2016)
- Kuyili as Sharadha (2013-2016)
- Rajasekar as Rajasekar (2013-2016)
- Raghavan as Arunachalam - Thamizh's best friend and Priya 's father (2013-2015)
- Anbalagan as Anbuarasan - Janani and Tulasi's father (2013-2016)
- Sai Gayathri as Aishwarya (2013)
- Inba as Inba (2014)
- Shyam as Gautham (2014)

=== Season 3 ===
- Rio Raj as Saravanan Veluchamy: Ramasamy's Grandson; Meenatchi's husband, Veluchamy's Second son and Muthazhagu's ex-fiancé (2016-2018)
- Rachitha Mahalakshmi as Meenatchi Saravanan (2016-2018) / Vedhavalli (2018): Saravanan's wife, Lakshmi's first daughter and Veluchamy's Second daughter in law and (Vedhavalli character in Past)
- Gayathri Yuvraaj as Muthazhagu Sankarapandi: Sankarapandi's wife; Palani's first daughter and Raji's best friend, Saravanan's ex-fiancé (2016-2018)
- Ravi Chandran as Veluchamy: Ramasamy's son; Sankarapandi, Saravanan, Sathya, Raji's father and Deivanai's husband and Palani's brother and Maruthu's best friend (2016-2018)
- Senthi Kumari as Deivanai Veluchamy: Sankarapandi, Saravanan, Sathya, Raji's father and Veluchamy's wife; Ramasamy's daughter in law (2016-2018)
- Rajasekar as Ramasamy: Veluchamy and Palani's father; Sankarapandi, Saravanan, Sathya and Raji's Grand father (2016-2018)
- Sankarapandi as Sankarapandi Veluchamy: Veluchamy's first son; Saravanan, Sathya and Raji's elder brother; Muthazhagu's husband (2016-2018)
- Deepa Shankar as Pazhaniyammal [Pazhani]: Veluchamy's sister and Ramasamy's daughter; Muthazhagu and Thangam's mother (Main Female Comedian) (2016-2018)
- Samantha as Sathyavathi Sakthivel a.k.a.[Sathya]: Sankarapandi's younger sister and Saravanan and Raji's elder sister, Veluchamy's first daughter; Sakthivel's wife (2016-2018)
- Rajkumar as Sakthivel: Sathya's husband (Main Male Comedian) (2016-2018)
- Pavithra Janani as Rajeswari Veluchamy a.k.a. Raji: Veluchamy's Second daughter; Sankarapandi, Sathya and Saravanan's younger sister and Randi's love interest (2016-2018)
- Meenakshi Govindarajan as Thangam a.k.a. Thangameenatchi: Palani's second daughter, Muthazhagu's younger sister and Kathir's lover (2016-2018)
- Vishnu Unnikrishnan as Kathirvel Saravanan [Kathir]: Thangam's lover (2017-2018)
- Lakshmi as Lakshmi Marudupandi: Marudu's wife; Meenatchi, Randi and Jyothi's mother (2016-2018)
- G. Gnanasambandan as Marudupandi a.k.a. Marudu: Veluchamy's best friend and Lakshmi's husband; Meenatchi, Randi and Jyothi's father (2016-2018)
- Rindhya as Nandhini / Malathy: Vedhavalli's Foe (2018)
- Suchithra as Jyothi, Maruthu's Younger daughter; Meenatchi and Randi's younger sister (2016-2018)
- Britto as Rathnavel Pandi [Randi]: Maruthu's son and Meenatchi's younger brother; Raji's love interest (2016-2018)
- Anbarasan as Anbarasu: Lakshmi's brother; Meenatchi's uncle and Karthi's father (2016-2018)
- Suzane George as Raadhika: Sankarapandi's ex-fiancé (2016-2018) / Haripriya Isai as Raadhika (2018)
- Shivani Narayanan as Gayatri: Saravanan and Swetha's friend; Also a Participant in Kitchen Competition (2017)
- Myna Nandhini as Madonna alias Marikozhundhu: Meenatchi's best friend (2016-2017)
- V. J. Chitra as Veni: (Ghost) Killed by Lakshmi and her brother, so she takes a revenge against Meenatchi's family (2017)
- Vadivukkarasi as (Judge) (2017)
- Rhema Ashok as Swetha: Gayatri and Saravanan's friend but initially she doesn't like Saravanan. Also a Participant in Kitchen Competition (2017)
- Karthi as Karthi: Anbarasu's son and Meenatchi's ex-fiancé (2016-2018)
- Kumara Moorthi as Kuruvilla alias Gurusamy, Saravanan's best friend (2016-2018)
- Franklin as Gnanamani, Saravanan's best friend (2016-2018)
- Vasu Vikram as Renganathan: Kathir's father (2018)
- Nithya Ravindran as Sivakami Ammal: Kathir's mother (2018)
- Sai Gayatri as Host (2017)
- V.J. Andrews as Host and Saravanan's friend (2017)

== Reception ==
Saravanan Meenatchi season 1 attracted high viewership ratings during its broadcast in 2011–2013. The series was a major hit in India and Sri Lanka and received immense popularity by Tamilians across the world. Season 1 of the series was the no 1 serial in TN for several weeks and also it was the first non- Sun TV serial to the top charts maintaining its no 1 position in top 3 till end. The cast members quickly became household names, several of them the faces of various endorsements and advertisements. The wedding of Saravanan Meenatchi was even conducted in real time and at a real place with much fanfare. The marriage was held in Karaikudi. In fact, invitations and sweet packets were distributed among the people of Karaikudi. The marriage episode was telecast for two-and-half-hours in Chennai, and the TRP ratings shot up to 10 in Chennai, and 6.4 all over Tamil Nadu.

After the series ended, Mirchi Senthil and Sreeja Chandran got married on 2 July 2014 in Tirupati. It was a family affair and no celebs were present.

== Sequels ==
=== Season 2 ===
Season 2 begins with Shakthi Saravanan who returns to India as Saravanan and Meenakshi's son, 20 years after his parents went overseas. He wants to search for a bride who is like his mother.

Main cast

- Kavin as Saravana Perumal a.k.a. Vettaiyan
- Rachitha Mahalakshmi as Thanga Meenatchi "Meenatchi"
- Mohammad Irfan as Shakthi Saravanan

=== Season 3 ===
Love blossoms between a simple middle-class boy Saravanan and a rich girl Meenatchi, an MBA graduate from London. Despite the differences in their background, Saravanan and Meenakshi get married and lead a happy life together.

Main cast

- Rachitha Mahalakshmi as Meenatchi
- Rio Raj as Saravanan
- Gayathri Yuvaraj as Muthazhagu

== Awards and nominations ==
All of Saravanan Meenatchi season 1 awards are listed here. The serial was awarded 'Best Serial', 'Best Male Actor', 'Best Female Actor', 'Best Director' and 'Best Character Actor' at the 43rd annual awards function organized by Mylapore Academy.

Year	Award	Category	Recipient	Role	Result
2014	Vijay Television Awards	Favourite Actor Male	Mirchi Senthil	Saravanan	Won
2014	Vijay Television Awards	Favourite Actor Female	Sreeja Chandran	Meenatchi	Won
2014	Vijay Television Awards	Favourite Screen Pair	Mirchi Senthil & Sreeja Chandran	Saravanan & Meenatchi	Won
2014	Vijay Television Awards	Favourite Fiction Series	Saravanan Meenatchi		Won
2014	Vijay Television Awards	Favourite Supporting Actor Male	Rajasekar	Rajasekar	Nominated
2014	Vijay Television Awards	Favourite Supporting Actor Male	Rajasekar	Rajasekar	Nominated
2014	Vijay Television Awards	Favourite Supporting Actor Female	Kuyili	Sharadha	Nominated
2014	Vijay Television Awards	Special Jury Award	Rajasekar	Rajasekar	Won
2014	Vijay Television Awards	Special Jury Award	Kuyili	Sharadha	Won
