= Andal Azhagar =

Indian Tamil-language soap opera

- ஆண்டாள் அழகர்
- Genre: Soap opera
- Written by: S. Ramana Girivasan
- Directed by: Francis Kathiravan
- Starring: Rishikesh; Kalyani; Stalin; Ramya
- Theme music composer: Ilaiyavan
- Composer: Ilaiyavan
- Country of origin: India
- Original language: Tamil
- No. of seasons: 2
- No. of episodes: 416

Production
- Producer: K. J. Ganesh
- Camera setup: Multi-camera
- Running time: approx. 20-22 minutes per episode
- Production company: Venus Infotainment

Original release
- Network: STAR Vijay
- Release: 8 September 2014 – 6 May 2016

Andal Azhagar is a 2014-2016 Indian Tamil language drama television series starring Rishikesh, Kalyani, Stalin and Ramya. It aired Monday through Friday on Vijay TV from 8 September 2014 to 8 April 2016 at 7:30PM (IST) and 11 April 2016 to 6 May 2016 6:30PM (IST) for 416 episodes.

The series is written and directed by Francis Kathiravan. The show completed its 400th episode on 13 April 2016. It reunited Stalin and Ramya, who previously starred together in Saravanan Meenatchi (2011–2014).

Andal Azhagar season 2 began airing 9 May 2016 as Pagal Nilavu with different story and new cast.

== Plot ==
This story centres around two warring families. The problem started when Vadivu ran away with Murugesan (a poor person) and married him. Their parents supposedly died due to grief, and there is conflict between the families. Azhagar and Aandal fall in love. Despite the enmity, Azhagar and Sakthi (Andal's second brother) are friends. Sakthi has hidden feelings for Revathi, Azhagar's sister.

Azhagar falls for Andal on first sight and tries to impress her. Then Andal too falls for Azhagar. Vadivu learns of this and advises Andal to break up the budding romance. Later Sakthi learns of Azhagar and Andal's love and decides to kill Azhagar. As Andal and Azhagar promise to break up, Sakthi forgives them.

Marriage arrangements are made for Andal. Meanwhile, Revathi is engaged to her friend Dinesh, and Sakthi is engaged to another girl in the same village. Azhagar tries to alert Andal that her bridegroom is not good. Andal refuses to believe it. On the day of marriage, Andal realizes the bridegroom's real character and asks Sakthi to stop the wedding. Sakthi doesn't believe Andal. So Andal asks for Azhagar's help, and they elope and marry. Furious Sakthi kidnaps Revathi and marries her. Revathi decides to live with Sakthi to punish him.

In Azhagar's house, Andal is tortured by Vadivu and Annam, Azhagar's sister-in-law. Andal somehow wins over her father-in-law Murugesan's heart and goes for work. She strives hard to make Azhagar a lawyer. Sakthi starts to impress Revathi. Meanwhile, Annam and Vadivu make plans to separate Andal and Azhagar. They bring Mayil, Annam's sister, to their home to marry Azhagar and to separate Andal and Azhagar forever. Arusamy, Azhagar's eldest brother, and Sakthi stand for the local MLA election. Revathi works for Sakthi's victory.

Azhagar becomes a lawyer. Mayil conceives Arusamy's baby. Arusamy requests Azhagar to accept the blame until the completion of election and Azhagar agrees- trouble brews between Andal and Azhagar. Sakthi wins the election. Arusamy reveals the truth.

Meanwhile, Azhagar is arrested because of a police complaint submitted by Andal and is ill-treated in jail. On learning the truth, Andal requests Azhagar to forgive her. Azhagar refuses and tortures her, and they go for a divorce. Sakthi befriends Malar, his political party leader's sister. Azhagar is helpful to Divya, a lawyer, his senior lawyer's relative.

Murugesan builds a hospital for Andal and allows Andal to name it after her father, Chidambaram. Revathi becomes a collector and confesses her love for Sakthi. At the same time, Murugesan comes to take Revathi back to their home, and Revathi leaves as per Chidambaram's instruction. Chidambaram is ready to forgive Murugesan for the sake of Revathi. Eventually, Revathi confesses her love for Sakthi to Murugesan, and he accepts their love and agrees to forgive Chidambaram. Meanwhile, Vadivu decides to marry Divya to Azhagar, but in reality, Azhagar misses Andal.

Arusamy starts a rumour of an illicit relationship between Malar and Sakthi. Furious at that Sakthi tries to stab Arusamy. But by mistake, he stabs Murugesan, critically injuring him. Chidambaram, Andal and Revathi are angry at Sakthi for his action. They refuse to forgive him. But Malar supports him and takes care of him. Murugesan is saved. Revathi decides to punish Sakthi for his act and expels Andal from the home.

Malar loves Sakthi and decides to save him. Revathi conceives Sakthi's baby and claims that she will bring the child up against him. Chidambaram accepts Andal into his home again. Azhagar realizes his love for Andal. Andal is called a witness in court about the stabbing of Murugesan by Sakthi. Despite everyone's advice, Andal speaks the truth and becomes the prime witness against her brother Sakthi. After court, Andal pleads for Sakthi's understanding. He refuses and disowns Andal. Malar files her witness statement that she and Sakthi have an affair and that Sakthi was with her that night. Sakthi is released from the case. He leaves his house after blaming Chidambaram and Andal for abandoning him.

Azhagar confesses his love for Andal, and they reunite. Revathi arranges for Azhagar and Divya's engagement without Azhagar's knowledge. This upsets Andal and snubs Azhagar. Malar carries on marriage arrangement for her and Shakthi claiming to him that it is just a fake method to bring out Revathi's love for Shakthi, but she intends to marry him herself.

Azhagar, Murugesan, Andal, Divya, Andal's brother and sister-in-law attends Thenu (Andal's friend) and Kathi (Azhagar's friend) wedding. Azhagar and Andal reunite. Azhagar takes Andal to his home. As Revathi refuses to accept them, they move to Chidambaram's house.

A bond develops between Chidambaram and Azhagar. Revathi secretly misses Shakthi. Shakthi tries to convince Revathi. Everyone advises Shakthi not to marry Malar. Revathi confides her feelings for Shakthi to Murugesan and decides to reunite with him as per Murugesan's advice. Andal and Azhagar, with Chidambaram's, advise stopping Shakthi and Malar's planned wedding.

Meanwhile, Shakthi reveals to Malar's brother that the marriage plan was fake. Malar's brother has a heart attack and is hospitalised. The hospitalized brother requests Shakthi to marry Malar as his last wish. Revathi, Andal and Azhagar rush to the hospital. Shakthi marries Malar before the three arrive. Revathi is broken. Shakthi realizes that Malar has cheated him.

Revathi blames Azhagar for her fate and calls him a traitor. Also, there have been conflicts happening in Murugesan House between Revathi and her sister-in-law, Annam. Believing that she is the cause of all the problems in her house, Revathi leaves the house.

Shakthi stops talking to Malar and turns to drinking because she tricked him. On one such day, a drunk Shakthi gets close to Malar, believing she is Revathi, and Malar also uses this to her advantage, and they have a physical relationship. In the morning Shakthi bitterly berates Malar and leaves her. Malar then attempts suicide, but is saved. Malar tells Shakthi that she will free him from their marriage. They go to the temple, and there Malar hugs Shakti and wishes him luck in searching for Revathi. At the same time, Revathi, who has returned to speak to Shakthi, sees Malar and Shakthi hugging in the temple and leaves the town immediately.

Soon, Malar and Andal are pregnant. Months pass, and Shakthi still doesn't talk to Malar. Andal is found to be pregnant with twins, and so she is pampered by her family and her father-in-law. Revathi is living an independent yet hard life alone, and she is shown to be living in her friend's house in New Delhi. Later, Revathi gives birth to a boy. Andal is given a baby shower, and even though everyone conducts this ceremony happily, Chidambaram is mad that Azhagar did not come to see his wife. Annam gives birth to a boy. While everyone is happy, Shakthi is still not talking to Malar and is worrying about Revathi and her child. Shakthi's friend Poosari advises him to forgive Malar as she is now pregnant with his child.

On Prabarkaran's birth, he forgives her and treats her nicely. Malar is pleased. On the delivery, Shakthi invites his family and goes to their house. They ignore him. However, his mother, brother and sister-in-law arrive, making him happy. Yet, due to Azhager's hate for Shakhti, Andal does not come, though Shakthi understands. At the time of the other births, Andal has twin daughters. She named them Revathi (a request from Azhager) and Shakti because of her fondness for her brother. Malar is furious that one of the twins has been called Revathi though she keeps it hidden from her husband, who is happy about the names. The names of Revathi's and Arusamy's child are not revealed until Pagal Nilavu, the next generation of Andal Azhager. The gender of Revathi's baby is published in the serial and she considers calling him Azhager, but declines it after what happened. Azhagar plans to send his daughters into a school away from Madurai, to shield them from the drama and considers boarding school.

Despite the peaceful atmosphere, problems continue, like Revathi's absence. She does not return to Madurai in Andal Azhagar.

== Cast ==
=== Main ===
- Shiva (Rishikesh) as Azhagarsamy "Azhagar"
- Kalyani as Aandal
- Stalin Muthu as Sakthivel "Sakthi"
- Ramya Shankar as Revathy
- Nivisha Kingkon (2014) → Reshma Pasupuleti (2015) → Suzane George (2016) as Malarvizhi "Malar"

=== Recurring ===
- K. Natraj as Chidhambaram
- Sheela as Viji
- Ramesh as Karthikeyan
- Deepa as Subathra
- Manoj Kumar as Murugesan
- Shanthi Williams as Vadivu
- Jacquline Lydia as Thenmozhi (Thenu)
- Anu as Divya
- Raju Jeyamohan as Kathiresan (Kaththi)
- Gemini Mani as Poosari
- Subbaiah as Aarusamy
- Sudha as Mangai
- Rathnaraj as Malarvizhi's brother
- Chandran
- Vishalini as Mythili
- Preethi Kumar as Mayil
- Karthik Sasidharan as Vinod
- Minnal Deepa

=== Special appearances ===
- Senthil Kumar as RJ Senthil
- Manit Joura as Manit Joura
- Yatin Karyekar as Ananthakumar
- Jiiva as Jeeva
- Shiva as Shiva

== Awards and nominations ==
In 2015, at its Vijay Television Awards, the channel gave its program the Best supporting actor male award to Stalin and the Best Family award was given to the Aandal Azhagar team. Kalyani also received the Performer Special Award for her work. Apart from these, Kalyani was also nominated for Best Heroine award. Ramya also nominated for Best supporting actor Female.

Year	Award	Category	Recipient	Role	Result
2015	Vijay Television Awards	Favourite Comedian Fiction	Deepa	Subathira	Nominated
2015	Vijay Television Awards	Favourite Comedian Fiction	Raju	Kathir	Nominated
2015	Vijay Television Awards	Favourite Actor Male	Shiva	Azhagar	Nominated
2015	Vijay Television Awards	Favourite Actor Female	Kalyani	Andal	Nominated
2015	Vijay Television Awards	Favourite Fiction Series			Nominated
2015	Vijay Television Awards	Favourite Supporting Actor Male	Stalin	Sakthivel	Won
2015	Vijay Television Awards	Favourite Supporting Actor Female	Ramya	Revathy	Nominated
2015	Vijay Television Awards	Special Jury Award	Kalyani	Andal	Won
2015	Vijay Television Awards	Special Jury Award	Ramya	Revathy	Won
2015	Vijay Television Awards	Best BGM	Ilayavan	Himself	Nominated
2015	Vijay Television Awards	Best Promo-Fiction	Raju & Bala	Himself	Won
2015	Vijay Television Awards	Best Family			Won
