= Kavin (actor) =

Indian actor (born 1990)

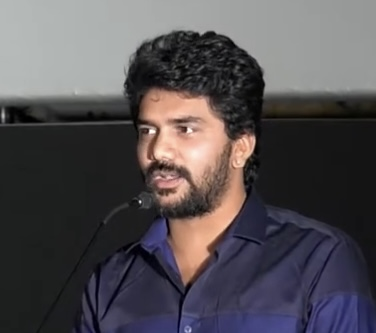
- Kavin in 2024
- Born: Kavin Raj; 22 June 1990 (age 36); Tiruchirappalli, Tamil Nadu, India
- Education: Loyola College, Chennai
- Occupations: Actor; Television host
- Years active: 2011–present
- Spouse: Monica David (m. 2023)
- Children: 2
- Awards: Full list

Kavin (born 22 June 1990) is an Indian actor who predominantly works in Tamil cinema.

== Early life and family ==
Kavin pursued his education at Loyola College, Chennai. During his early college years, he started attending auditions conducted by Star Vijay. His first notable appearance on television was through the college edition of Kana Kaanum Kaalangal, where he portrayed Siva, one of the lead characters. He continued working with Star Vijay, appearing in supporting roles in the serials Thayumanavan and the first season of Saravanan Meenatchi.

In the second season of Saravanan Meenatchi, Kavin initially played an antagonist. However, the character of his, Vettaiyan, underwent a transformation during the course of the series and became the main lead. His performance earned him widespread acclaim and he won the Vijay Television Award for Favourite Actor Male in 2015.

After the end of Saravanan Meenatchi Season 2, Kavin chose to focus on building a career in the Tamil film industry, opting not to appear in further television serials.

== Film career ==
=== 2011–2017: Early years ===
Prior to gaining recognition, Kavin had appeared in small roles in Karthik Subbaraj’s Pizza (2012) and R. Ravikumar’s Indru Netru Naalai (2015).

In 2017, he played a supporting role as a doctor opposite Aishwarya Dutta in S. R. Prabhakaran’s Sathriyan (2017), featuring Vikram Prabhu and Manjima Mohan. Although Sathriyan received mixed reviews, it helped Kavin gain visibility.

=== 2019–present: Breakthrough ===
Kavin's first lead role came with Natpuna Ennanu Theriyuma (2019), directed by Shiva Aravind, a friend he met during his Star Vijay days. The film, where he starred opposite Remya Nambessan, faced several release delays due to distribution issues but eventually released to mixed reviews. Nevertheless, the film helped establish Kavin as a leading actor. In 2019, Kavin rose to wider fame by participating in the third season of Bigg Boss. His stint on the show significantly boosted his popularity among the Tamil audience.

Following this, he played the lead in Lift (2021), directed by Vineeth Varaprasad. Released on Disney+ Hotstar, the film opened to positive response from critics and viewers alike. In 2022, Kavin starred in the romantic web series Akash Vaani, which premiered on February 11. It is not until his next movie success did he achieve critical and commercial success. This was with the film Dada (2023), earning high praise for his performance as irresponsible youngster turned young father having to navigate life as a single parent. His emotional acting combined with the film's screenplay emerged as an enormous critical success becoming a milestone in his decade long career. Another reason why this film stands out is it diverts from Kavin's usual chocolate boy aesthetic, he has long curly hair and a messy look painting him in a new picture entirely. It certainly established him as a nuanced fine actor in the Tamil film industry and opened new doors. Having high expectations, Kavin's next, Star, was released in 2024 to mixed reviews. Despite the financial failure of the movie, it emerged as the highest-grossing film of his career, continuing his growth as a bankable leading actor. The same year, his fifth film as lead actor, Bloody Beggar, was released to mixed-to-negative reviews and became a box-office bomb. However, after its theatrical run was completed and was released on its streaming platform, the film received a more positive response from viewers. In 2025, Kiss, also received a positive response from critics, and Kavin's performance was specifically praised though it failed commercially due to poor promotions. In the same year he starred alongside Andrea Jeremiah in the film Mask which opened to mixed to positive reviews though it also underperformed the box office due to its high budget. In 2026, Kavin's next Hi, co-starring Nayanthara was released on August 28, 2026, to positive reviews from critics and became his best performing film after Star (2024).

Apart from movies, Kavin has also graced the screen with his presence in various shows, interviews, and tv serials. Some of these fun interviews certainly do deserve a mention. These include but are not limited to:

1. Water War with Kavin - Irfan View: A funfilled messy game show type interview where we get to see Kavin's funny side while het gets destroyed with water by Irfan.
2. VJ Siddhu Vlogs Motta Maadi Party with Kavin
3. Madan Gowri OMG Show with Kavin

== Personal life ==
Kavin's previous relationships as seen on his appearance on Bigg Boss sparked major conversations around the reality tv audience. Following this Kavin entered into a relationship with Monica David, a private school teacher, and the couple married on 20 August 2023.

. Kavin and Monica were blessed with twin babies—a baby boy and a baby girl—in July 2026.

== Filmography ==
=== Films ===
Key
†	Denotes films that have not yet been released

Year	Films	Role	Notes	Ref.
2012	Pizza	Ghost researcher	Uncredited role	
2015	Indru Netru Naalai	Anu's imaginary husband	Uncredited role	
2017	Sathriyan	Chandran		
2019	Natpuna Ennanu Theriyuma	Shiva	Debut as lead actor	
2021	Lift	Guruprasad		
2023	Dada	Manikandan		
2024	Star	Kalaiarasan		
2024	Bloody Beggar	Beggar		
2025	Kiss	Nelson / Sendhan		
2025	Mask	Velu		
2026	Hi :)	Mayilsamy		
TBA	Kavin #9 †	TBA	Filming	

=== Television ===
Year	Serial / Show	Role	Channel	Notes
2011–2012	Kana Kaanum Kaalangal Kalloori Salai Season 2	Siva	Star Vijay	
2013–2014	Thayumanavan	Vicky	Star Vijay	
2012–2013	Saravanan Meenatchi	Murugan	Star Vijay	
2013–2016	Saravanan Meenatchi Season 2	Saravana Perumal "Saravanan" (Vettaiyan)	Star Vijay	Lead role
2019	Bigg Boss Tamil – Season 3	Contestant	Star Vijay	Walked out with 5 lakhs
2021	Bigg Boss Tamil – Season 4	Guest	Star Vijay	
2021	Bigg Boss Tamil – Season 5	Guest	Star Vijay	
2022	Akash Vaani	Akash	aha	
2023	Bigg Boss Tamil – Season 6	Guest	Star Vijay	
2024	Bigg Boss Tamil – Season 8	Guest	Star Vijay	
2025	Bigg Boss Tamil – Season 9	Guest	Star Vijay	

=== Host ===
- Vettaiyadu Vilaiyadu for Star Vijay
- Filmfare Awards South 2018 Tamil version for Star Vijay
- Vijay Television Awards 2015 & 2017 for Star Vijay
- Kings of Dance (season 1) for Star Vijay
- Jailer Audio Launch (2023) for Sun TV

=== Music video ===
- "Asku Maaro" for Sony Music South

== Awards ==
Awards

Year	Award	Show / film	Role	Reference
2015	Vijay Television Awards for Favourite Actor Male	Saravanan Meenatchi	Saravana Perumal alias Vettaiyan	
2019	Game Changer Award	Bigg Boss Tamil 3		
2019	Behindwoods Gold Medal Awards for Most Popular Person on Television	Bigg Boss Tamil 3		
2019	Chennai Times Most Desirable Man on Television			
2019	Chennai Times Most Desirable Man on 6th position			
2020	Viral Song of the Year 2019	Bigg Boss Tamil 3	"We are the boyz"	
2021	Chennai Times Most Desirable Man (16th Position)			
2022	Best Actor Male OTT – Blacksheep Digital Awards	Lift		
2023	People's Favourite Actor of the Year – Behindwoods Gold Icons 2023	Dada		
2024	Most Promising Actor of the Year – South Indian International Movie Awards 2024	Dada		
