= Saravanan Meenatchi season 3 =

Saravanan Meenatchi
- Season 3
- Cover Photo of Saravanan Meenatchi S3
- Starring: Rio Raj; Rachitha Mahalakshmi; Gayathri Yuvraaj
- No. of episodes: 1901 (as of combining three seasons)

Release
- Original network: Star Vijay
- Original release: 18 July 2016 – 17 August 2018

Season chronology
- ← Previous; Season 2

The third season of Saravanan Meenatchi began airing on 18 July 2016 and finished on 17 August 2018. It consisted of 575 episodes. The show starred Sun Music anchor Rio Raj and Saravanan Meenatchi (season 2) fame Rachitha Mahalakshmi in the titular roles.

The 2nd longest Tamil TV series ended up with season 3 being the last version of the Saravanan Meenatchi franchise after running successfully for 1765 episodes as of 17 August 2018 (7 years).

== Synopsis ==
Love blossoms between a simple middle class boy Saravanan (Rio Raj) and a rich girl Meenatchi (Rachitha Mahalakshmi), an MBA graduate from London. Despite the differences in their background, Saravanan and Meenakshi get married and lead a happy life together.

== Cast ==
=== Main ===
- Rio Raj as Saravanan Veluchamy: Ramasamy's Grandson; Meenatchi's husband, Veluchamy's Second son and Muthazhagu's ex-fiance
- Rachitha Mahalakshmi as Meenatchi Saravanan / Vedhavalli: Saravanan's wife, Lakshmi's first daughter and Veluchamy's Second daughter in law
- Gayathri Yuvraaj as Muthazhagu Sankarapandi: Sankarapandi's wife; Palani's first daughter and Raji's best friend, Saravanan's ex-fiance
- Ravi Chandran as Veluchamy: Ramasamy's son; Sankarapandi, Saravanan, Sathya, Raji's father and Deivanai's husband and Palani's brother and Maruthu's best friend
- Senthi Kumari as Deivanai Veluchamy: Sankarapandi, Saravanan, Sathya, Raji's mother and Veluchamy's wife; Ramasamy's daughter in law
- Rajasekar as Ramasamy: Veluchamy and Palani's father; Sankarapandi, Saravanan, Sathya and Raji's Grand father
- Sankarapandi as Sankarapandi Veluchamy: Veluchamy's first son; Saravanan, Sathya and Raji's elder brother; Muthazhagu's husband
- Deepa Shankar as Pazhaniyammal [Pazhani]: Veluchamy's sister and Ramasamy's daughter; Muthazhagu and Thangam's mother
- Syamantha Kiran as Sathyavathi Sakthivel a.k.a.[Sathya]: Sankarapandi's younger sister and Saravanan and Raji's elder sister, Veluchamy's first daughter; Sakthivel's wife
- Rajkumar Manoharan as Sakthivel: Sathya's husband
- Pavithra Janani as Rajeswari Veluchamy a.k.a. [Raji]: Veluchamy's Second daughter; Sankarapandi, Sathya and Saravanan's younger sister and Randi's love interest

=== Recurring ===
- Lakshmi Vasudev as Lakshmi Marudupandi: Marudu's wife; Meenatchi, Randi and Jyothi's mother
- G. Gnanasambandan as Marudupandi a.k.a. Marudu: Veluchamy's best friend and Lakshmi's husband; Meenatchi, Randi and Jyothi's father
- Rindhya as Maya / Madathi: Vedhavalli's Foe
- Suchithra as Jyothi, Maruthu's Younger daughter; Meenatchi and Randi's younger sister
- Britto as Rathnavel Pandi [Randi]: Maruthu's son and Meenatchi's younger brother; Raji's love interest
- Anbarasan as Muthaiah: Lakshmi's brother; Meenatchi's uncle and Karthi's father
- Meenakshi Govindarajan as Thangam a.k.a. Thangameenatchi: Palani's second daughter, Muthazhagu's younger sister and Kathir's lover
- 'Dubsmash' Vishnu Unnikrishnan as Kathirvel Saravanan [Kathir]: Thangam's lover
- Suzane George / Haripriya Isai as Raadhika: Sankarapandi's ex-fiance
- Shivani Narayanan as Gayatri: Saravanan's friend and Swetha's friend; Also a Participant in Kitchen Competition
- Myna Nandhini as Madonna: Meenatchi's best friend
- V. J. Chitra as Veni: (Ghost), Karthi 's wife (Killed by Lakshmi and her brother; so she take a revenge against Meenatchi's family)
- Vadivukkarasi as Judge
- Rhema Ashok as Swetha: Gayatri's friend and Saravanan's friend but initially she doesn't like Saravanan. Also a Participant in Kitchen Competition
- Karthi as Karthi: Anbarasu's son and Meenatchi's ex-fiance and Veni's husband
- Kumara Moorthi as Kuruvilla, Saravanan's best friend
- Franklin as Gnanamani, Saravanan's best friend
- Vasu Vikram as Renganathan: Kathir's Father
- Nithya Ravindran as Sivakami Ammal: Kathir's Mother
- Saai Gayatri as (Host)
- V.J. Andrews as (Host) and Saravanan's friend

== Awards and nominations ==
Year	Award	Category	Recipient	Role	Result
2017	3rd Vijay Television Awards	Favourite Find of The Year	Rio Raj	Saravanan	Won
2017	3rd Vijay Television Awards	Favourite Actor Female	Rachitha	Meenatchi	Won
2017	3rd Vijay Television Awards	Favourite Supporting Actor Female	Gayathri	Muthazhagu	Won
2017	3rd Vijay Television Awards	Special Jury Award	Sankarapandi	Sankarapandiyan	Won
2017	3rd Vijay Television Awards	Favourite Supporting Actor Male	Sankarapandi	Sankarapandiyan	Nominated
2017	3rd Vijay Television Awards	Favourite Fiction Series	Saravanan Meenatchi (season 3)		Won
2017	3rd Vijay Television Awards	Best Family	Saravanan Meenatchi (season 3)		Nominated
2017	3rd Vijay Television Awards	Best Director	Praveen Bennet		Won
2017	3rd Vijay Television Awards	Favourite Mamiyar	Deepa		Nominated
2017	3rd Vijay Television Awards	Favourite Mamiyar	Senthikumari	Deivanai	Nominated
2017	3rd Vijay Television Awards	Favourite Mother	Senthikumari	Deivanai	Nominated
2017	3rd Vijay Television Awards	Favourite Comedian Fiction	Daglus Kumara Moorthy	Kuruvilla	Nominated
2017	3rd Vijay Television Awards	Favourite Comedian Fiction	Frankline	Gnanamani	Nominated
2017	3rd Vijay Television Awards	Favourite Negative role Female	Lakshmi	Lakshmi	Nominated
2017	3rd Vijay Television Awards	Favourite Actor Male	Rio Raj	Saravanan	Nominated
2018	Galatta Nakshathra Awards	Best Actor	Rio Raj	Saravanan	Nominated
2018	Galatta Nakshathra Awards	Best Actress	Rachitha	Meenatchi	Nominated
2018	Galatta Nakshathra Awards	Best Pair	Rio Raj & Rachitha	Saravanan & Meenatchi	Nominated
2018	Galatta Nakshathra Awards	Best Villain	Gayathri	Muthazhagu	Nominated
2018	Galatta Nakshathra Awards	Best Serial	Saravanan Meenatchi (season 3)		Nominated
2018	Galatta Nakshathra Awards	Best Supporting Actress	Senthil Kumari	Deivanai	Nominated
2018	Galatta Nakshathra Awards	Best Supporting Actress	Nandhini		Nominated
2018	4th Vijay Television Awards	6 Years Awards	Rachitha	Meenatchi	Won
2018	4th Vijay Television Awards	Favourite Actor Male	Rio Raj	Saravanan	Nominated
2018	4th Vijay Television Awards	Favourite Supporting Actor Male	Sankarapandi	Sankarapandiyan	Nominated
2018	4th Vijay Television Awards	Favourite Mamiyar	Senthil Kumari	Deivanai	Won
2018	4th Vijay Television Awards	Favourite Fiction Series	Saravanan Meenatchi (season 3)		Nominated
2018	4th Vijay Television Awards	Best Crew Fiction	Saravanan Meenatchi (season 3)		Nominated
2018	4th Vijay Television Awards	Favourite Family	Saravanan Meenatchi (season 3)		Nominated
2018	4th Vijay Television Awards	Best Father	Ravi Chandran		Nominated
2018	4th Vijay Television Awards	Favourite Comedian Fiction	Rajkumar	Sakthivel	Won
2018	4th Vijay Television Awards	Favourite Comedian Fiction	Kumara Moorthi	Kuruvilla	Nominated
2018	4th Vijay Television Awards	Favourite Screen Pair	Rio Raj & Rachitha	Saravanan & Meenatchi	Nominated

== See also ==
- Saravanan Meenatchi
- Saravanan Meenatchi (season 2)
