= Saravanan Meenatchi season 2 =

Saravanan Meenatchi
- Season 2
- Starring: Kavin; Rachitha Mahalakshmi; Irfan; V J Chitra; Myna Nandhini
- No. of episodes: 1901 (as of combining three seasons)

Release
- Original network: Star Vijay
- Original release: 21 October 2013 – 15 July 2016

Season chronology
- Next → Season 3

The second season of Saravanan Meenatchi began airing on 21 October 2013 and finished on 15 July 2016. It consisted of 700 episodes.

== Plot ==
Season 2 begins with Shakthi Saravanan, son of Saravanan and Meenatchi, coming to India from Canada to find a bride like his mom. He comes to his mom's village Kallidaikurichi in Tirunelveli where his maternal uncle, Tamizh, and family live. Shakthi Saravanan disguises himself and lives in Tamizh's house where he meets Tamizh's daughter, Thanga Meenatchi, and falls for her. After all oppositions from Tamizh, ultimately she too falls for Shakthi Saravanan. Tamizh is strongly against Thanga Meenatchi and Sakthi Saravanan's love due to tensions between the families in the previous generation. Because of this, Tamizh decides to marry his daughter Thanga Meenatchi to his other sister Sudha's son Saravana Perumal a.k.a. Vettaiyan.

Shakthi Saravanan promises to save Thanga Meenatchi from the wedding and Vettaiyan promises not to marry her if Saravanan comes. Unfortunately, he never shows up (he gets deported back to Canada because of his visa expiration) and Vettiyan and Meenatchi get married. Meenatchi develops a strong hatred towards Vettiyan because of this sudden marriage. Meenatchi meets a guy at her college named Inba who promises to take her to Canada to meet Saravanan. His real intention is to kidnap her and rape her. Vettaiyan saves Meenatchi from Inba and his gang, and Vettaiyan himself promises Meenatchi that he will take her to Canada and unite her with Saravanan. They get really close and Meenatchi starts developing feelings for Vettaiyan without even realizing it. Although Meenatchi develops feelings for Vettaiyan, she tries to deny it.

She decides to break ties with Vettaiyan if she wants to live with Saravanan. When Meenatchi is on the way to the temple to break all ties with Vettaiyan, she meets with an accident and loses her memory.

Meenatchi meets Vettaiyan again and starts to develop feelings for him not remembering their marriage or her previous love with Shakthi Saravanan. Vettaiyan and Meenatchi start dating, and Vettaiyan hides the truth about Saravanan from Meenatchi. Soon Meenatchi gets to know that Vettaiyan is her husband and goes home to happily live with him.

Then she learns about her past with Shakthi Saravanan and is angry with Vettaiyan. After learning more about the sacrifices and hardships Vettaiyan faced for and because of her, she heartily accepts him and they start to live together. After a few months, they bump into a lady who shares Meenatchi's name and appearance, beginning season 3.

== Cast ==
Main

- Kavin as Saravana Perumal a.k.a. Vettaiyan
- Rachitha Mahalakshmi as Thanga Meenatchi Saravana Perumal
- V. J. Chitra as Kalaiyarasi (Vettaiyan's friend and loves him one-sidedly)
- Myna Nandhini as Revathi a.k.a. Mynaa (Vettaiyan and Meenatchi`s best friend)
- Mohamed Irfan as Shakthi Saravanan
  - Prem Kumar as Shakthi Saravanan (Cameo) (Replacement of Irfan)

Recurring

- RJ Priya as Priya (Arunachalam's daughter, Shakthi Saravanan's friend and loves him one-sidedly)
- Deepa Nethran as Sudha (Vettaiyan's mother, Thamizh's younger sister)
- Kumara Moorthi as Kumara Moorthi a.k.a. Douglas (Vettaiyan's best friend)
- Alagesh (Venkatesh) as Thamizh (Meenatchi`s dad, Vettaiyan's maternal uncle)
- Lakshmi Vasudevan / Sri Latha as Soundharya (Meenatchi's mother, daughter of Rajasekar and Sharadha)
- Siddharth Kumaran as Vaitheeswaran (Meenatchi's brother)
- Pavithra Janani as Thulasi (Meenatchi's sister-in-law, Vaitheeswaran's wife)
- Karthik as Pandi - a man who loves Thanga Meenatchi one-sidedly
- Kuyili as Sharadha
- Rajasekar as Rajasekar
- Divya Prabhu → Pavithra Janani as in a dual role as Janani / Tulasi (Vaitheeswaran`s wife)
- Raghavan as Arunachalam - Priya's father
- Sai Gayathri as Aishwarya
- Inba as Inba
- Shyam as Gautham
- Raju Jeyamohan as Vettaiyan's friend
- Venkat Senguttuvan

== Awards and nominations ==
Season two was also awarded 'Best Male Actor' to Kavin, 'Best Female Actor' to Rachitha, 'Best Comedian' to Nandhini, 'Best Director' to Praveen Bennett, and 'Best Serial' at Vijay Television Awards 2015.

Year	Award	Category	Recipient	Role	Result
2014	Vijay Television Awards	Favourite Actor Male	Irfan	Shakthi Saravanan	Nominated
2014	Vijay Television Awards	Favourite Actor Female	Rachitha Mahalakshmi	Thanga Meenatchi	Nominated
2014	Vijay Television Awards	Favourite Screen Pair	Irfan & Rachitha Mahalakshmi	Shakthi Saravanan & Thanga Meenatchi	Nominated
2015	Vijay Television Awards	Favourite Actor Male	Kavin	Vettaiyan	Won
2015	Vijay Television Awards	Favourite Supporting Actor Female	Nandhini	Revathi (Mynaa)	Nominated
2015	Vijay Television Awards	Favourite Comedian Fiction	Nandhini	Revathi (Mynaa)	Won
2015	Vijay Television Awards	Favourite Comedian Fiction	Kumara Moorthi	Kumara Moorthi	Nominated
2015	Vijay Television Awards	Favourite Screen Pair	Kavin & Rachitha Mahalakshmi	Vettaiyan & Thanga Meenatchi	Nominated
2015	Vijay Television Awards	Favourite Fiction Series	Saravanan Meenatchi (season 2)		Won
2015	Vijay Television Awards	Favourite Supporting Actor Male	Sidharth	Vaitheeswaran	Nominated
2015	Vijay Television Awards	Favourite Supporting Actor Female	Kuyili	Dhanam	Won
2015	Vijay Television Awards	Favourite Mamiyar	Lakshmi	Lakshmi	Nominated
2015	Vijay Television Awards	Favourite Actor Female	Rachitha Mahalakshmi	Thanga Meenatchi	Won
2015	Vijay Television Awards	Best Director	Praveen Bennet	Himself	Won
2015	Vijay Television Awards	Best BGM	Ilayavan	Himself	Nominated
2015	Vijay Television Awards	Best Family			Nominated

== See also ==
- Saravanan Meenatchi
- Saravanan Meenatchi (season 3)
