= Pagal Nilavu (TV series) =

- Genre: Soap opera Drama; Romance
- Screenplay by: S. Ramana Girivasan; P. S. Shahul Hameed; Saleema (Dialogue); Priya Thambi; P. S. Shahul Hameed; Jagan Mohan
- Story by: S. Ramana Girivasan; Saleema
- Directed by: Francis Kathiravan (episodes 1–555); Ravi Priyan (episode 556–800)
- Starring: Syed Anwar Ahmed; Sameera Sherief; Shivani Narayanan; Mohammed Azeem; Vignesh Karthick; Soundarya Bala Nandakumar
- Theme music composer: Ilayavan
- Opening theme: Ilayavan
- Country of origin: India
- Original language: Tamil
- No. of seasons: 2
- No. of episodes: 800

Production
- Producer: K. J. Ganesh
- Cinematography: M. Antony
- Editors: H. Syed Mohamed; V. Sakthi
- Camera setup: Multi-camera
- Running time: approx. 20–22 minutes per episode
- Production company: Venus Infotainment

Original release
- Network: Star Vijay
- Release: 9 May 2016 – 9 March 2019

Related
- Andal Azhagar

Pagal Nilavu (lit. Day's Moon) is a 2016 Indian Tamil-language soap opera starring Syed Anwar Ahmed, Sameera Sherief, Shivani Narayanan, Mohammed Azeem, Vignesh Karthick and Soundarya Bala Nandakumar. It began airing on 9 May 2016 on STAR Vijay.

The series is the sequel and next generation story of Andal Azhagar, both of which were directed by Francis Kathiravan.

It is a story about love, but circumstances have made Andal and Azhagar's families rival for two generations. The drama explores whether their daughters, Revathy (Soundarya Bala Nandakumar) and Sakthi (Sameera Sherief) reunite the family.

== Cast ==
=== Main cast ===
- Syed Anwar Ahmed as Prabhakaran "Prabha": Sakthivel and Malar's son, Sakthi's husband, Karthick's half-brother and Sneha's former fiancé (2016–2018)
- Sameera Sherief as Sakthi Prabhakaran: Andal Azhagar's elder daughter, Praba's wife and Sneha's cousin (2016–2018)
- Shivani Narayanan as Sneha Arjun: Arjun's Wife, Prabha former fiancé and Sakthi and Revathi's cousin (2016–2019)
- Mohammed Azeem as Arjun, Sneha's husband, Thamizh former fiancé, Malarvizhi's Assistant (2017–2019)
- Vignesh Karthick as Karthick: Sakthivel and Revathi's son, Praba's half-brother, Revathy's husband and Sneha's friend (2016–2018)
- Soundarya Bala Nandakumar as Revathy Karthick: Andal Azhagar's younger daughter, Karthick's wife and Sneha's cousin (2016–2018)

=== Supporting cast ===
- Udhayabhanu Maheswaran as Sakthivel: Revathi and Malar's husband; Praba, Karthick and Thamizh's father and Andal's brother (2016–2019)
- Sindhu Shyam as Revathi: Sakthivel's first wife; Karthick's mother; Azhagar's sister; Sakthi, Revathy and Sneha's aunt (2016–2019)
- Reshma Pasupuleti (2016); Suzane George (2017); Dr. Sharmila (2017–2019) as Malarvizhi Sakthivel a.k.a. "Malar": Sakthivel's second wife; Praba and Thamizh's mother (main antagonist)
- Sreenidhi Sudarshan / Sahana Reddy as Thamizhselvi "Thamizh": Prabha's sister; Karthick half-sister; Sakthivel and Malar's daughter; Sneha's arch-rival, Arjun's former fiancé; Vikram's love interest (2016–2019) (dead)
- Mona Bedre as Andal Azhagar: Azhagar's wife; Sakthivel's sister; Sakthi and Revathi's mother (2016–2019)
- Manush as Azhagarsamy a.k.a. Azhagar: Andal's husband; Revathi's brother; Sakthi and Revathi's father; Sneha's uncle (2016–2019)
- Rekha Suresh as Ramya: Sneha's mother and Revathi's best friend; her brother's wife, Dileep's paternal aunt (2016–2018) (Dead)
- Rathinavel as Malar's brother (Antagonist) and Sakthivel's Politician friend (2016–2019)
- Mithun Raj as Dileep: Ramya's brother's son and Sneha's ex-fiancé (antagonist) (2017–2019)
- Deepa as Subatra: Andal's sister-in-law and Kayal's mother (comedian) (2016–2019)
- P.S.Chitra as Kayal: Subatra's daughter (2016–2018)
- Sathya as Inspector Sathya: Sneha's well-wisher (2018–2019)
- Jeeva as Vikram: Thamizh's love interest (2018–2019)
- Saif Ali Khan as Professor Ram: Sakthi and Sneha's enemy (antagonist) (2017–2018)
- K. Natraj as Chidambaram: Andal and Sakthivel's father; Prabha, Karthick, Sakthi, Revathi, Sneha and Thamizh's Grandfather
- Raghavendran as Palsamy
- Mani K. L. as Mani
- Ramesh Nallayan as Karthik and Sneha's friend
- Anand Amirthalingam as Vinay
- Shivakanth as Shiva
- Krishna Kumar as Krishna
- Manikandaraj Major as Vigilance officer
- Anita Nair as Dhara Bhai
- Gemini as Anand
- Karthik as Senior student
- Jeevanantham as Kuruvi
- R. Shyam as Rathinavel
- Subbaiah as Aaruchamy
- Sheela as Viji Chidambaram: Andal and Sakthivel's mother; Sakthi, Revathi, Thamizh, Praba and Karthick's grandmother (2016–2019)
- Chandraprakash as Murugesan: Azhagar, Revathi's father; Sakthi, Revathi, Sneha and Karthick's grandfather (2016–2017)
- Vanitha Hariharan as Nikhila "Nikki": Karthick and Sneha's friend
- Gemini Mani as Poosari: Sakthivel's best friend
- Raghavan as Dinesh
- Pavithra Janani as Karthika
- Priya as Vadivu Murugesan: Azhagar and Revathi's mother; Sakthi, Revathi, Sneha and Karthick's grandmother (2016–2017)

== Awards and nominations ==
Year	Award	Category	Recipient	Role	Result
2017	3rd Vijay Television Awards	Favourite Mother	Sindhu Shyam	Revathy	Won
2017	3rd Vijay Television Awards	Favourite Find Female	Sameera Sherief	Sakthi	Won
2017	3rd Vijay Television Awards	Best Family	Pagal Nilavu		Won
2017	3rd Vijay Television Awards	Favourite Actor	Vignesh Karthick	Karthick	Nominated
2017	3rd Vijay Television Awards	Favourite Actor	Syed Anwar Ahmed	Prabhakaran	Won
2017	3rd Vijay Television Awards	Favourite Actor	Mohammad Azeem	Arjun	Nominated
2017	3rd Vijay Television Awards	Favourite Actress	Soundarya Bala Nandakumar	Revathy	Nominated
2017	3rd Vijay Television Awards	Favourite Actress	Sameera Sherief	Sakthi	Nominated
2017	3rd Vijay Television Awards	Favourite Actress	Shivani Narayanan	Sneha	Nominated
2017	3rd Vijay Television Awards	Best Debut Female	Shivani Narayanan	Sneha	Won
2017	3rd Vijay Television Awards	Best Negative role	Dr. Sharmila	Malarvizhi	Nominated
2017	3rd Vijay Television Awards	Favourite Comedian Fiction	Deepa	Subathra	Nominated
2017		Favourite Screen Pair	Vignesh Karthick & Soundarya Bala Nandakumar	Karthick & Revathy	Nominated
2017		Favourite Screen Pair	Syed Anwar Ahmed & Sameera Sherief	Prabhakaran and Sakthi	Won
2017		Favourite Screen Pair	Mohammed Azeem & Shivani Narayanan	Arjun and Sneha	Won
2018	4th Vijay Television Awards	Best Budding Pair	Mohammed Azeem & Shivani Narayanan	Arjun & Sneha	Won
2018	4th Vijay Television Awards	Best Negative role	Dr. Sharmila	Malarvizhi	Won
2018	4th Vijay Television Awards	Favourite Actor Male	Vignesh Karthick	Karthick	Nominated
2018	4th Vijay Television Awards	Favourite Actor Male	Mohammed Azeem	Arjun	Nominated
2018	4th Vijay Television Awards	Favourite Actor Female	Soundarya	Revathy	Nominated
2018	4th Vijay Television Awards	Favourite Actor Female	Shivani Narayanan	Sneha Arjun	Nominated
2018	4th Vijay Television Awards	Favourite Supporting Actor Male	Udhayabhanu Maheswaran	Sakthivel	Nominated
2018	4th Vijay Television Awards	Favourite Find	Shivani Narayanan	Sneha	Won
2018	4th Vijay Television Awards	Favourite Family	Pagal Nilavu		Nominated
2018	4th Vijay Television Awards	Favourite Mother	Sindhu Shyam	Revathy	Nominated
2018	4th Vijay Television Awards	Best Father	Udhayabhanu Maheswaran	Sakthivel	Nominated
2018	4th Vijay Television Awards	Favourite Screen Pair	Vignesh Karthick & Soundarya	Karthick & Revathy	Nominated
2018	4th Vijay Television Awards	Best Dop	Antony Priyan		Nominated
2018	4th Vijay Television Awards	Favourite Fiction Series	Pagal Nilavu		Nominated
2018	4th Vijay Television Awards	Best Crew Fiction	Pagal Nilavu		Nominated

== See also ==
- Andal Azhagar
