= Rettai Roja =

Indian Tamil-language television series (2019)

- Genre: Drama Action Romance
- Written by: Dialogues; Karthik Ramkumar
- Screenplay by: Sargunam Pungaraj; Muthusamy Shakthivel
- Directed by: G. Manikandakumar; Abdullah; Nandha Kumar
- Starring: Chandini Tamilarasan; Akshay Kamal
- Theme music composer: Vishal Chandrasekar
- Opening theme: "Otti Porandha Rettai Roja"
- Composer: Kiran
- Country of origin: India
- Original language: Tamil
- No. of seasons: 1
- No. of episodes: 1013

Production
- Producer: Shruthi Narayanan
- Cinematography: Rajesh Kumar
- Editors: S.Arul, Lakshmi Murugesan
- Camera setup: Multi-camera
- Running time: approx. 25–27 minutes
- Production company: Shruthi Studios

Original release
- Network: Zee Tamil
- Release: 12 August 2019 – 17 March 2023

Rettai Roja (transl. Twin Rose) is a 2019–2023 Indian Tamil-language soap opera aired on Zee Tamil and also digitally available on ZEE5. It premiered on 12 August 2019 and ended on 17 March 2023 with 1013 Episodes. The show initially starred Shivani Narayanan, but she was later replaced by Chandini Tamilarasan.

== Summary ==
Anu and Abi are twin girls from a middle-class family. Despite their identical appearance, their personalities are quite different. Anu is dominant and greedy, while Abi is homely and caring. Anu resents her sister for receiving attention effortlessly, despite her own desperate attempts to be noticed and praised. Due to the ongoing conflict, their mother Deivanai enrolls them in a convent school. However, only Anu completes her education there, while Abi remains less educated. Eventually, Anu becomes a lawyer, and Abi takes up tailoring.

Meanwhile, brothers Santhosh and Sanjeev come from a wealthy family. Santhosh is simple and manages the family business, while Sanjeev is hot-tempered and easily angered, so their mother Seetha constantly attends to him. Santhosh meets Anu at a theme park and falls in love with her. He decides to work as her assistant without revealing his affluent background. Abi, on the other hand, meets Sanjeev when he hits an elderly man with his car. Sanjeev argues angrily with the man, but Abi advises him calmly. Sanjeev is drawn to Abi’s motherly demeanor and tells Seetha about her, which makes Seetha happy. Abi’s influence calms Sanjeev, and their love blossoms.

Seetha notices changes in both her sons: Santhosh is in love, and Sanjeev’s temper softens, all because of Abi. One day, Anu sees Abi with Sanjeev and warns her parents that Abi is “roaming around” with a man, demanding that Abi stop seeing him.

Seetha asks Santhosh to invite Anu over, and when Anu realizes he is wealthy, she agrees to marry him. As she leaves his house, she discovers that Sanjeev is Santhosh’s brother, which shocks her. Fearing that Abi could also marry into wealth by marrying Sanjeev, Anu decides to arrange a marriage for Abi. She convinces a poor thief named Salman to marry Abi. Excited, Salman and his mother Nagalakshmi agree. However, when Sanjeev hears of Abi’s engagement to Salman, he beats Salman and exposes him as a fraud, stopping the marriage. The police then arrest Salman.

Ramachandran's sister, Chinthamani, arrives with her daughter, Sreeja, to arrange a marriage between Sreeja and Sanjeev. When Anu visits Santhosh’s house, she meets Sreeja and Chinthamani, who plot to separate Abi and Sanjeev. Abi and Sanjeev resist their schemes, and Anu even warns her parents to hide Abi’s existence from Santhosh's family. Despite these efforts, Anu becomes engaged to Santhosh, and Sreeja to Sanjeev. However, Sanjeev dislikes Sreeja and, with the help of his uncle Kaali, uncovers her plot. He confides in Abi, strengthening their bond.

One day, Santhosh sees Sanjeev with a girl and realizes it’s Anu’s twin, Abi. Santhosh decides to help them get married. On the wedding day, Anu, Sreeja, and Chinthamani plot to kidnap Abi to force Sanjeev to marry Sreeja. They enlist Salman and Nagalakshmi to kidnap her, but Sanjeev and Kaali prevent the crime. Later, Anu pretends to be injured to manipulate Abi into leaving Sanjeev. Heartbroken, Abi leaves the marriage hall.

Eventually, Anu regrets her behavior. At that moment, she overhears Sreeja and Chinthamani planning to kill Abi and blame her death on Anu. Horrified, Anu warns them and decides to let Abi and Sanjeev marry, intending to reveal the truth to everyone. Enraged, Sreeja and Chinthamani kill Anu. Sanjeev finds Abi and tells the family about her being Anu’s twin, shocking everyone. Ramachandran chastises Kandhasamy and Deivanai for hiding the truth. To protect Anu’s reputation, Abi lies to Sanjeev, saying her love for him was false. This angers Sanjeev, and he begins to despise her.

Seetha finds Anu gravely wounded and hears the full story before Anu dies. Sreeja demands that Sanjeev marry her, but Santhosh offers to marry Sreeja to secure Sanjeev and Abi's happiness. Despite his reluctance, Sanjeev marries Abi, while Santhosh marries Sreeja. After the wedding, Kandhasamy, Deivanai, and Abi mourn Anu’s death. Sanjeev, still resentful, invites Abi into his home reluctantly. They agree to keep their plan to divorce a secret from the family.

Anu’s spirit returns to help Abi and Sanjeev reconcile. However, Sreeja and Chinthamani discover Anu’s ghostly presence and seek the aid of a pandit to banish her spirit permanently.

== Cast ==
=== Main ===
- Shivani Narayanan / Chandini Tamilarasan in a dual role as:
  - Anuradha "Anu" - Eldest twin born to Kandhasamy and Deivanai, Santhosh's ex-fiancee and a lawyer. She hates her younger twin sister Abi because she looks alike her. She was dead, killed by Sreeja.
  - Abirami "Abi" - Youngest twin born to Kandhasamy and Deivanai, Sanjeev's wife and a tailor. She loves her sister Anu.
- Akshay Kamal as Sanjeev and Pandi (dual role)
  - Sanjeev: Abi's husband; Santhosh's younger brother; Ramachandran and Seetha's second son (2019–2023)
  - Pandi: Sanjeev's look alike; a ruthless gangster in Tirunelveli district (2021–2022)

=== Recurring ===
- Nimesh Sagar as Santhosh: Anu's ex-fiancé; Sreeja's husband; Ramachandran and Seetha's first son (2019–2023)
- VJ Mounika as Sreeja: Santhosh's wife; Sanjeev's ex-fiancée; Chinthamani's daughter (2019–2023)
- Meena Vemuri as Chinthamani: Ramachandran's younger sister; Sreeja's mother and Santhosh's mother-in-law (2019–2023)
- Bharatha Naidu as Inspector Jhansi
- Tamil Selvi (2019–2020) / Meera Krishna (2020–2021) / Seetha Anil (2021–2023) in a dual role as
  - Seetha: Santhosh and Sanjeev's mother, Ramachandran's wife
  - Lakshmi: Seetha's twin sister and a great lawyer
- L. Raja as Ramachandran: Santhosh and Sanjeev's father; Sreeja and Abi's father-in-law (2019–2021)
- Poovilangu Mohan as Kandhasamy: Anu and Abi's father; Sanjeev's father-in-law (2019–2020)
- Sabitha Anand as Deivanai: Anu and Abi's mother; Sanjeev's mother-in-law (2019–2020)
- Diwakar as Kaali: Seetha's younger brother (2019–present)
- Rashmitha Roja as Muthazhagu: Sanjeev's wife (2021–2022)
- Jeyanthi Narayanan as Pandi's mother (2021–2022)
- Senthilnathan as Pandi's father (2021–2022)
- Sangavi (2021) / Dhanalakshmi (2021–2022) as Raasathi: Pandi's sister

=== Special appearances ===
- "Singer" Srikanth Deva as Himself: Anu, Santhosh, Sreeja and Sanjeev's marriage guest (2020)
- Madhan Bob as Kunchithapatham: A fake lawyer who cheats Sreeja and Chintamani (2020)
- Priya as Kavitha: Sreeja's aunt (2019-2020)
- Indran as Salman: Abi's ex-fiancée (2019-2020)
- Sujatha as Nagalakshmi: Salman's mother (2019-2020)
- Bavithran as Sathish: Sreeja's first husband (2020)
- Vadivukkarasi as Tayamma (2022)

== Development ==
The series first promo was released on 2 April 2019 on YouTube by Zee Tamil. It stars Shivani Narayanan as in the role of both Anu and Abi. Later due to outbreak of COVID-19 and to pursue the opportunity of entering Bigg Boss, Shivani quit the series. So, in August 2020, she was replaced by actress Chandini Tamilarasan. Tamil TV actor Siddharth Kumaran was initially approached for the lead male protagonist but later the production team finalised Kannada TV actor Karan Sagar (Nimesh Sagar) for the role as Anu's pair. TikTok fame Akshay Kamal was selected for another male protagonist as Abi's pair.

== Special and crossover episodes ==
Rettai Roja cast and crew amalgamated the episodes called Triveni Sangamam with Endrendrum Punnagai and Rajamagal from 26 December 2020 to 9 January 2021. This was the first time in Indian television shows for three series to be combined.
