= LBW: Love Beyond Wicket =

2026 Indian television series

- Official Poster
- Genre: Coming-of-age; Sports drama
- Written by: Aruna Rakhee
- Directed by: Ganesh Karthikeyan, Koan
- Starring: Vikranth; Sindhu Shyam; Smruthi Mohankumar; Ayaz Khan; Mrudula; Niyathi Kadambi; Daffe Naveen; Akshatha; Nikhil Nair; Gundu Karthik; Vishwa Mithran; Harish
- Theme music composer: Arun Raj
- Composer: Sudharshan
- Country of origin: India
- Original languages: Tamil (Original), Telugu, Kannada, Hindi, Malayalam.
- No. of seasons: 1
- No. of episodes: 120

Production
- Executive producer: RJ Shyam Sundar
- Producers: Padmini Rajavelu; Rajavelu
- Cinematography: Barathkumar Gopinath
- Editors: Vignesh Arjun; Sreedhar M
- Production company: A Tele Factory

Original release
- Network: JioHotstar
- Release: 1 January – 23 July 2026

LBW: Love Beyond Wicket is a 2026 Indian Tamil-language coming-of-age sports drama television series written by Aruna Rakhee, directed by Ganesh Karthikeyan, and starring Vikranth, Niyathi Kadambi, Harish, Daffe Naveen, Gundu Karthik, Sindhu Shyam, Smruthi Mohankumar and Ayaz Khan. The series' story is based on Cricket coach Rangan and his students. The show premiered on JioHotstar on 1 January 2026 and ended with 120 episodes on 23 July 2026.

== Series overview ==
Series	Episodes	Originally released	
Series	Episodes	First released	Last released
1	120	1 January 2026	23 July 2026

== Synopsis ==
This series follows a failed cricket player turned coach for the Muthu Nagar Cricket Academy team (Rangan). Rangan's journey along with students at the struggling academy, who unite to preserve a legacy while finding their own paths, forms the main plotline.

== Cast ==
- Vikranth as Rangan
- Sindhu Shyam as Rukmini
- Smruthi Mohankumar as Minister Tulasi
- Ayaz Khan as Manikandan
- Niyathi Kadambi as Thangam
- Daffe Naveen as Matheyan
- Akshatha as Theovathy
- Nikhil Nair as Rishi
- Gundu Karthik as Pandu
- Vishwa Mithran as Veera
- Mohan Brat as Jackie
- Sikkandar Basha as Velu
- Jeeva Balchandran as Girish
- Mrudula as Anu
- Sneha Sakthi as Varsha
- Sowmya Sharon as Lara
- Kavya Amira as Padma
- Ram G as Vinay
- Harishankar Narayanan as Rajasekhar

== Production ==
=== Development ===
The series was announced by JioHotstar under the banner of South UnBound on 9 December 2025. The platform plans to launch nine new original shows in the Tamil language. This series was created as the first series of the Hotstar Specials lineup in 2026.

The series is directed by Ganesh Karthikeyan, written by Aruna Rakhee, and produced by A Tele Factory, which previously produced Chinna Thambi, Eeramana Rojave 2 and Heart Beat.

=== Casting ===
Actor Vikranth play the a Cricket coach Rangan. This is his debut role in a limited series, alongside Akshatha, Daffe Naveen, Niyathi Kadambi, Harish, Sindhu Shyam and Ayaz Khan.

=== Release ===
The first trailer was released under the banner of South UnBound on 9 December 2025. The first promo was released on 17 December 2025 and revealed the releasing date. On 22 December 2025, was releasing the series song. The series was released on 1 January 2026 in Tamil, Telugu, Malayalam, Kannada, Hindi, Marathi and Bengali.
