= Shivani Narayanan =

Indian actress

- Born: E.Kumaralingapuram, Virudhunagar, Tamil Nadu, India
- Occupations: Model; Actress; Host
- Years active: 2016 - Present
- Known for: Rettai Roja; Pagal Nilavu; Bigg Boss Tamil

Shivani Narayanan is an Indian actress who predominantly works in the Tamil film and television industry. In 2020, she was a contestant on the reality series Bigg Boss 4 Tamil.

== Early life ==
Shivani Narayanan was born on 5 May 2001 in Sattur, Tamil Nadu, and lived there for the first ten years of her life, until her family later moved to Chennai. Her mother is Akila Narayanan.

== Career ==
Shivani Narayanan began modeling when she was fourteen-years-old. She made her television debut in 2016 Vijay TV's Pagal Nilavu as Sneha Arjun. Initially she was cast in a supporting role but later her character was changed to a lead role after her character was well praised among audiences. Then she appeared as a guest in Saravanan Meenatchi 3 in which she played the role of Gayathri with negative shades. She next appeared on Jodi Fun Unlimited as a contestant and became a finalist. She appeared in Kadaikutty Singam with the co-star from Pagal Nilavu. She left that serial and started a new serial in Rettai Roja in a dual role as Anu and Abi, but was replaced by Chandini Tamilarasan. She then concentrated her focus on Instagram where she attained a fabulous fan following. In 2020, she had participated in the Indian reality show Bigg Boss 4 Tamil. Following her popularity she was cast opposite Vijay Sethupathi in the LCU's Vikram starring Kamal Haasan. Next she signed for supporting roles in RJ Balaji's Veetla Vishesham movie and Vadivelu comeback movie Naai Sekar Returns.

== Filmography ==
=== Films ===
Key
†	Denotes films that have not yet been released

Year	Film	Role	Notes	Ref.
2022	Vikram	Sumithra Santhanam	Debut film	
2022	Veetla Vishesham	Shalini Spandana 'Shalu'		
2022	DSP	SI Mari Kozhundhu		
2022	Naai Sekar Returns	Bobby		
2023	Bumper	Anandhi		

=== Television ===
Year	Title	Role	Channel	Notes	Ref.
2016–2019	Pagal Nilavu	Sneha Arjun	Star Vijay		
2017	Saravanan Meenatchi Season 3	Gayathri	Star Vijay	Special Appearance	
2018-2019	Jodi Number One Fun Unlimited	Contestant	Star Vijay	Third Runner-Up	
2019	Raja Rani Season 1	Sneha Arjun	Star Vijay	Special Appearance	
2019	Kadaikutty Singam	Meenakshi	Star Vijay	Replaced by Iraa Agarwal	
2019–2020	Rettai Roja	Anuradha "Anu" and Abirami "Abi"	Zee Tamil	Dual Role; Replace by Chandini Tamilarasan	
2019	Zee Tamil Kudumbam Viruthugal Prelude	Guest	Zee Tamil	Nomination Prelude	
2020–2021	Bigg Boss Tamil Season 4	Contestant	Star Vijay	Evicted Day 98	
2021	Bigg Boss Season 4 Kondattam	Guest	Star Vijay	Special Show	
2021	BB Jodigal Season 1	Contestant	Star Vijay	Episode 1 Only	
2025	Top Cooku Dupe Cooku season 2	Contestant	Sun TV		

== Awards and nominations ==
Year	Award	Category	Result	Show	Role	Ref(s)
2017	3rd Annual Vijay Television Awards	Best Debut Female	Won	Pagal Nilavu	Sneha	
2017	3rd Annual Vijay Television Awards	Favorite Actress	Nominated	Pagal Nilavu	Sneha	
2017	3rd Annual Vijay Television Awards	Favorite On-Screen Pair (With Mohammed Azeem)	Nominated	Pagal Nilavu	Sneha	
2018	4th Annual Vijay Television Awards	Best & Favorite Budding Pair (With Mohammed Azeem)	Won	Pagal Nilavu	Sneha	
2018	4th Annual Vijay Television Awards	Favorite Actress	Nominated	Pagal Nilavu	Sneha	
2018	4th Annual Vijay Television Awards	Favorite Find of the Year	Won	Pagal Nilavu	Sneha	
2019	Zee Kudumba Virudhugal	Most Promising Actress	Won	Rettai Roja	Anuradha "Anu" / Abirami "Abi" (Dual Role)	
2019	Zee Kudumba Virudhugal	Favourite Heroine	Nominated	Rettai Roja	Anuradha "Anu" / Abirami "Abi" (Dual Role)	
