= Baakiyalakshmi =

Indian Tamil television series

- Promotional poster
- Genre: Drama
- Developed by: Leena Gangopadhyay
- Written by: Sangeetha Mohan; Priya Thambi; Dialogue: Krish
- Directed by: Siva Sekar (episodes 1–25); I. David (episodes 26–1469)
- Creative directors: Priya Thambi; S. V. Rathna Kumar
- Starring: K. S. Suchitra Shetty; Sathish Kumar; Reshma Pasupuleti
- Theme music composer: Kiran
- Country of origin: India
- Original language: Tamil
- No. of seasons: 1
- No. of episodes: 1469

Production
- Producer: Venus Infotainment Private Limited
- Editors: V. Sakthi; T. Vinoth Nathan
- Camera setup: Multi-camera
- Running time: 20–22 minutes
- Production company: Venus Infotainment

Original release
- Network: Star Vijay
- Release: 27 July 2020 – 8 August 2025

Related
- Sreemoyee

Baakiyalakshmi is an Indian Tamil-language television drama series that aired on Star Vijay from 27 July 2020 to 8 August 2025, completing 1469 episodes. It is an official remake of the Bengali television series Sreemoyee broadcast on Star Jalsha. The series starred K. S. Suchitra Shetty in the titular role, with Sathish Kumar and Reshma Pasupuleti in other prominent roles.

== Plot ==
Baakiyalakshmi follows Baakiyalakshmi (Baakiya), a dedicated housewife who is constantly belittled by her husband, Gopinath (Gopi), and her family due to her lack of formal education. Despite the lack of support from most of her family—except her second son, Ezhil—Baakiya ventures into entrepreneurship by starting a small-scale spice business called "Eshwari Home Foods". As her business expands into a successful catering service, she uncovers that Gopi has been having a long-term extramarital affair with his college classmate, Radhika. Upon exposing the truth, a heartbroken Baakiya fiercely reclaims her dignity, demands a mutual divorce, forces Gopi out of the house, and promises to financially repay him for the property value.

Following the divorce, Gopi marries Radhika and moves directly across the street, leading to ongoing neighborhood and domestic friction. Baakiya continues to thrive independently, learning English, learning to drive, and upgrading her business into a successful restaurant. Meanwhile, her children navigate turbulent lives. Her eldest son, Chezhiyan, marries Jenny but their relationship faces severe strain due to a miscarriage and Chezhiyan’s temporary infidelity with a co-worker before they ultimately reconcile. Ezhil pursues his dream of filmmaking and marries Amritha, a young widow, despite intense opposition from his grandmother, Eshwari.

In the final arcs of the series, Baakiya's business faces sabotage from Gopi, while her daughter, Iniya, enters a disastrous, abusive marriage with a businessman's son named Nitish. When Nitish is accidentally killed in a confrontation, Gopi protects Iniya by taking the blame. However, Ezhil uncovers CCTV footage that exposes Nitish's stepfather as the true culprit, clearing Gopi's name. The series concludes five years after its premiere with Iniya finding happiness and marrying her true love, Akash, bringing the family's long emotional journey to a peaceful closure.

== Cast ==
=== Main ===
- K. S. Suchitra Shetty as Baakiyalakshmi aka Baakiya: (2020–2025)
  - Cook who runs a catering company.
  - Karpagam's daughter; Gopi's ex-wife; Chezhiyan, Ezhil and Iniya's mother; Yazhini's grandmother; Nila's step-grandmother.
- Sathish Kumar as Gopinath aka "Gopi": (2020–2025)
  - Former consulting firm owner turned Cloud kitchen owner.
  - Ramamoorthy and Eshwari's son; Baakiya and Radhika's ex-husband; Chezhiyan, Ezhil and Iniya's father; Yazhini's grandfather; Nila's step-grandfather.
- Nanditha Jennifer (2020–2021) / Reshma Pasupuleti (July 2021–2025) as Radhika:
  - HR in an IT company.
  - Kamala's daughter; Chandru's sister; Rajesh and Gopi's ex-wife; Mayura's mother; Baakiya's friend.

=== Recurring ===
- S. T. P Rosary as Ramamoorthy: Sundaram's brother; Eshwari's husband; Gopi's father; Chezhiyan, Ezhil and Iniya's grandfather; Yazhini's great-grandfather; Nila's step-great-grandfather. (2020–2024) (Dead)
- Rajyalakshmi as Eshwari: Ramamoorthy's widow; Gopi's mother; Chezhiyan, Ezhil and Iniya's grandmother; Yazhini's great-grandmother; Nila's step-great-grandmother. (2020–2025)
- Velu Lakshmanan (Aryan) (2020–2022) / Vikash Sampath (June 2022–2025) as Chezhiyan: Baakiya and Gopi's elder son; Ezhil and Iniya's brother; Jenny's husband; Yazhini's father.
- Divya Ganesh as Jennifer aka "Jenny": Joseph and Maria's daughter; Chezhiyan's wife; Yazhini's mother. (2020–2025)
- VJ Vishal (2020–2024) / Naveen Prince (May 2024–2025) as Ezhilan aka "Ezhil": Baakiya and Gopi's younger son; Chezhiyan and Iniya's brother; Amirtha's second husband; Nila's step-father.
- Rithika Tamil Selvi (2021–2023) / Akshitha Ashok (August 2023–2025) as Amirtha: Ganesh's ex-wife; Ezhil's wife; Nila's mother.
- Neha Menon as Iniya: Baakiya and Gopi's daughter; Chezhiyan and Ezhil's sister; Nithish's widow; Akash's wife. (2020–2025)
- Akash Natarajan (2020–2022) / Ajith Kumar (2025) as Akash: Selvi and Bhaskar's son; Iniya's second husband.
- Baby Kritisha as Nila: Ganesh and Amirtha daughter; Ezhil's step-daughter. (2021–2025)
- Baby Ahana as Yazhini: Chezhiyan and Jenny's daughter. (2023–2025)
- Meena Sellamuthu as Selvi: The maid in Baakiyalakshmi's house, also her dear friend; Bhaskar's wife; Akash's mother. (2020–2025)
- Parthiban as Bhaskar: Selvi's husband; Akash's father. (2020–2025)
- Jeeva Rajendran as Nithish: Chandrika's son; Sudhakar's step-son; Iniya's husband. (2025) (Dead)
- Sanjay Kumar Asrani as Sudhakar: Chandrika's 2nd husband; Nithish's step-father and murderer; Baakiya's business rival. (2025)
- Mercy Leyal as Chandrika: Sudhakar's wife; Nithish's mother. (2025)
- Unknown (2020–2021) / Sherin Thara (July 2021–2025) as Mayura aka "Mayu": Radhika and Rajesh's daughter.
- Nathan Shyam as Rajesh Kumar: Radhika's ex-husband; Mayura's father. (2020–2022)
- Sheela as Kamala: Chandru and Radhika's mother. (2021–2025)
- Yuvanraj Nethrun as Chandru: Kamala's son; Radhika's brother. (2022–2024)
- Unknown (2020–2022) / Arvind Kathare (2022–2025) as Senthil: Gopi's best friend.
- Manush Manmohan (2020–2023) / Dasarathy (December 2023–2025) as Joseph David: Maria's husband; Jenny's father; Yazhini's grandfather.
- Mona Kakade as Maria Joseph: Joseph's wife; Jenny's mother; Yazhini's grandmother. (2020–2025)
- VJ Madhan (2021) / Madhusudhan (2023–2024) as Ganesh: Amirtha's ex-husband; Nila's father
- R. Aravindraj as Ganesh's father (2021–2024)
- Revathy Shankar as Ganesh's mother (2021–2024)
- Sanjay Shankar as Rajashekar: Baakiya's well wisher and business supporter (2020–2023)
- Deepthi Kapil (2023) / Rhema Ashok (2023–2024) as Malini: Chezhiyan's client
- Keerthi Vijay as Varshini: Filmmaker's daughter; Ezhil's ex-fiancée (2022–2023)
- Priya as Karpagam: Baakiya's mother; Chezhiyan, Ezhil and Iniya's grandmother; Yazhini's great-grandmother; Nila's step-great-grandmother. (2020)
- Sangeetha V as Kavitha: Karpagam's daughter-in-law. (2021)
- Sam as Rajinikanth: a physiotherapist (2022)
- Gokul Krishnan as Sathish: Ezhil's friend. (2020–2023)
- Pranika as Nikhila: Iniya's friend who was sexually harassed by a teacher. (2021)
- Charlie Jey as Santhosh: Iniya's senior and former love interest. (2020–2021)
- Hema Chinraj as Hema: Iniya's best friend. (2020–2021)
- Sri Latha as Geetanjali: Iniya's school principal. (2020–2022)
- Geetha Narayanan as Nancy: Baakiyalakshmi's neighbor. (2020–2021)
- Santhaanam Ganesan as Ezhil's best friend. (2021–2022)
- Prakash Rajan as Raveendran: Baakiya customer; Annamal's husband. (2020)
- Devi Teju as Annamal: Raveendran's wife. (2020)
- Sumangali (2021–2022) / Babitha Jose (2023–2025) as Amritha's mother
- Kausalya Senthamarai as a judge (2020–2021)
- Ranjith as Pazhaniswami aka Palani: Baakiya's friend. (2023–2024)
- A. Revathy as Pazhaniswami's mother (2023–2024)
- Ashwin Kannan as Vimal: Pazhaniswami's nephew. (2024)
- Sai Lakshmi as Sumathi: Pazhaniswami's sister. (2024)
- Unknown as Anand: The chef sent by Gopi to Baakiya's hotel. (2024–2025)
- Pandiarajan as Sundaram: Ramamoorthy's brother. (2020–2021)

=== Special appearances ===
- Rekha (2021)
- Priya Raman (2021)
- Siddharth as Eeswaran (2023)
- Anitha Sampath (2024)

== Production ==
=== Casting ===
Actress Kasthuri Shankar was initially considered for the role of Baakiyalakshmi as well Intinti Gruhalakshmi, the Telugu-language version of the serial, airing on Star Maa. She later opted out of the Tamil version, citing the bad experiences and the opinion differences that she had with the Vijay Television in the show Bigg Boss (Tamil TV series) season 3. The role later went to actress Priya Raman, who eventually disagreed, due to date clashes with the Sembaruthi serial, telecasted in Zee Tamil.

Kannada TV actress Suchitra was finally cast as the protagonist Baakiyalakshmi. Actor Sathish Kumar was cast as Baakiyalakshmi's husband, Gopinath's character. Nanditha Jennifer initially played the role of Radhika but left the serial in July 2021 as she was unhappy with her character transitioning into a villain. As a result, she was replaced by Reshma Pasupuleti. VJ Vishal was selected to portray the role of Ezhilan (Baakiyalakshmi's younger son) who played an Main role, but on 21 May 2024 he quit the series, and it was replaced by actor Naveen.

In 2021, Rithika Tamil Selvi was cast to play Amritha opposite Ezhilan. However she quit the series, and was replaced by Akshitha Ashok in the role of Amritha.

On 18 December 2021, Actress Priya Raman was play a cameo in special three-hour episode.

In February 2022, Velu Lakshmanan also quit the series, saying he received the lead male role in the Zee Tamil serial Meenakshi Ponnunga. however he sign new serial for Zee Tamil. In June 2022 Actor Vikash Sampath was cast in play the role of Chezhiyan.

In early 2023, Ranjith was cast to play Pazhaniswami.

== Reception ==
=== Ratings ===
It was the second most-watched Tamil television program within a period of 2020. In May 2023, the series was the third most watched Tamil-language television series after Kayal and Ethirneechal. In July 2024, the series became the fifth most watched TV series in Tamil Nadu after a long gap.

== Crossovers episodes ==
- In 2021, Pandian Stores had crossover episodes with Baakiyalakshmi from 5 February to 28 February.
- In 2024, Baakiyalakshmi had crossover episodes with Pandian Stores 2 from 22 January to 13 February.
