= Sindhu Shyam =

Indian actor and Bhartnatyam dancer

- Born: 4 December 1983 (age 42)
- Occupation: Actress
- Years active: 1997–present
- Spouse: Shyam Ganesh (m. 2002)
- Children: 1

Sindhu Shyam is an Indian actress and Bharathanatyam dancer who has worked predominantly in Malayalam and Tamil films and television series.

== Career ==
She started learning dance from age 4, winning several prizes in Kerala School Youth Festival. She made her television debut with the serial Shakthi. She is known for her roles in Pagal Nilavu and Deivamagal. Subsequently, she participated in reality shows like Mrs. Chinnathirai and Kitchen Super Star season 2. She is successfully juggling between her television and film commitments in Tamil and Malayalam.

== Filmography ==
Year	Film	Role	Language	Notes
1993	Paithrukam		Malayalam	
1997	Bhoothakkannadi	Minikutty	Malayalam	
1999	Vanaprastham	Saradha	Malayalam	
2000	Swayamvara Panthal	Maya	Malayalam	
2000	Oru Cheru Punchiri	Nirmala	Malayalam	
2000	Mazha	Jnanam	Malayalam	
2000	Madhuranombarakattu	Seetha	Malayalam	
2001	Praja	Mehrunissa a.k.a. Paru	Malayalam	
2001	Jeevan Masai	Sita	Malayalam	
2004	Aaytha Ezhuthu	Thara	Tamil	
2007	Rock n' Roll	Kamala	Malayalam	
2007	Mission 90 Days	Journalist	Malayalam	
2007	Ore Kadal	Arathy	Malayalam	
2011	Raa Raa	Lakshmi	Tamil	
2013	Puthagam	Nancy	Tamil	
2014	Naan Sigappu Manithan	Meera's sister	Tamil	
2016	Kuttrame Thandanai	Vijay Prakash's wife	Tamil	
2017	Rangoon	Esther Thomas	Tamil	
2017	Bogan	Vikram's sister	Tamil	
2018	Sketch	Jeeva's sister-in-law	Tamil	
2018	Kaatrin Mozhi	Receptionist Preethi	Tamil	
2018	Abhiyum Anuvum	Doctor	Tamil	
2019	Kee	Victim of Roncracker	Tamil	
2022	Cobra	Bhavana's relative	Tamil	
2026	29	Viji's mother	Tamil	

== Television ==
Serials

Year	Serial	Role	Language	Notes
	Shakthi		Tamil	
	Narmadippudava		Malayalam	
	Raagardram		Malayalam	
	Boomika	Boomika	Tamil	
1999–2000	Sthree		Malayalam	
2001	Sankeerthanam Pole		Malayalam	
2000–2002	Sreeraman Sreedevi		Malayalam	
2001–2002	Vava	Gadha/Vava	Malayalam	
2004	Paneer Pushpangal		Tamil	
2004	Ashtapadi	Gouri	Malayalam	
2004–2005	Kanavugal Aayiram	Deepa	Tamil	
2006	Sthree		Malayalam	
2006–2009	Anandham	Manisha	Tamil	
2007	Ethir Neechal	Deepa	Tamil	
2007	Narmadipudava	Kanakam	Malayalam	
2007	Mandharam	Amrutha	Malayalam	
2007–2008	Priyamanasam	Uma	Malayalam	
2008	Manikoondu		Tamil	
2008–2010	Kana Kanum Kalangal Kallooriyin Kathai		Tamil	
2008–2010	Rekha IPS		Tamil	
2009	Kalyanam		Tamil	
2011	Nagamma		Tamil	
2012	Aaha	Brinda	Tamil	
2012–2013	Hridayam Sakshi	Bala	Malayalam	
2012–2014	Puguntha Veedu	Anusha	Tamil	
2014–2018	Deivamagal	Thilagavathy	Tamil	
2014–2016	Ponnunjal	Shamili	Tamil	
2014–2015	Balamani	Revathy	Malayalam	
2016	Bhairavi Aavigalukku Priyamanaval		Tamil	Guest role
2016–2018	Pagal Nilavu	Revathi	Tamil	
2019	Ponmagal Vanthal	Herself	Tamil	
2018–2020	Oviya	Anbarasi	Tamil	
2019–2020	Run	Meenakumari	Tamil	
2020–2022	Idhayathai Thirudathe	Rajalakshmi	Tamil	
2023	Seetha Raman	Dance Master	Tamil	
2023-2024	Kizhakku Vaasal	Panjali	Tamil	
2024	Heart Beat Season 1	Jennifer	Tamil	
2025	Heart Beat Season 2	Jennifer	Tamil	
2026–Present	LBW: Love Beyond Wicket	Rukmini	Tamil	

=== Reality shows ===
- Mrs. Chinnathirai (Star Vijay)
- Kitchen Super Star season 2 (Star Vijay)
