= Robo Shankar =

Indian actor and comedian (1978–2025)

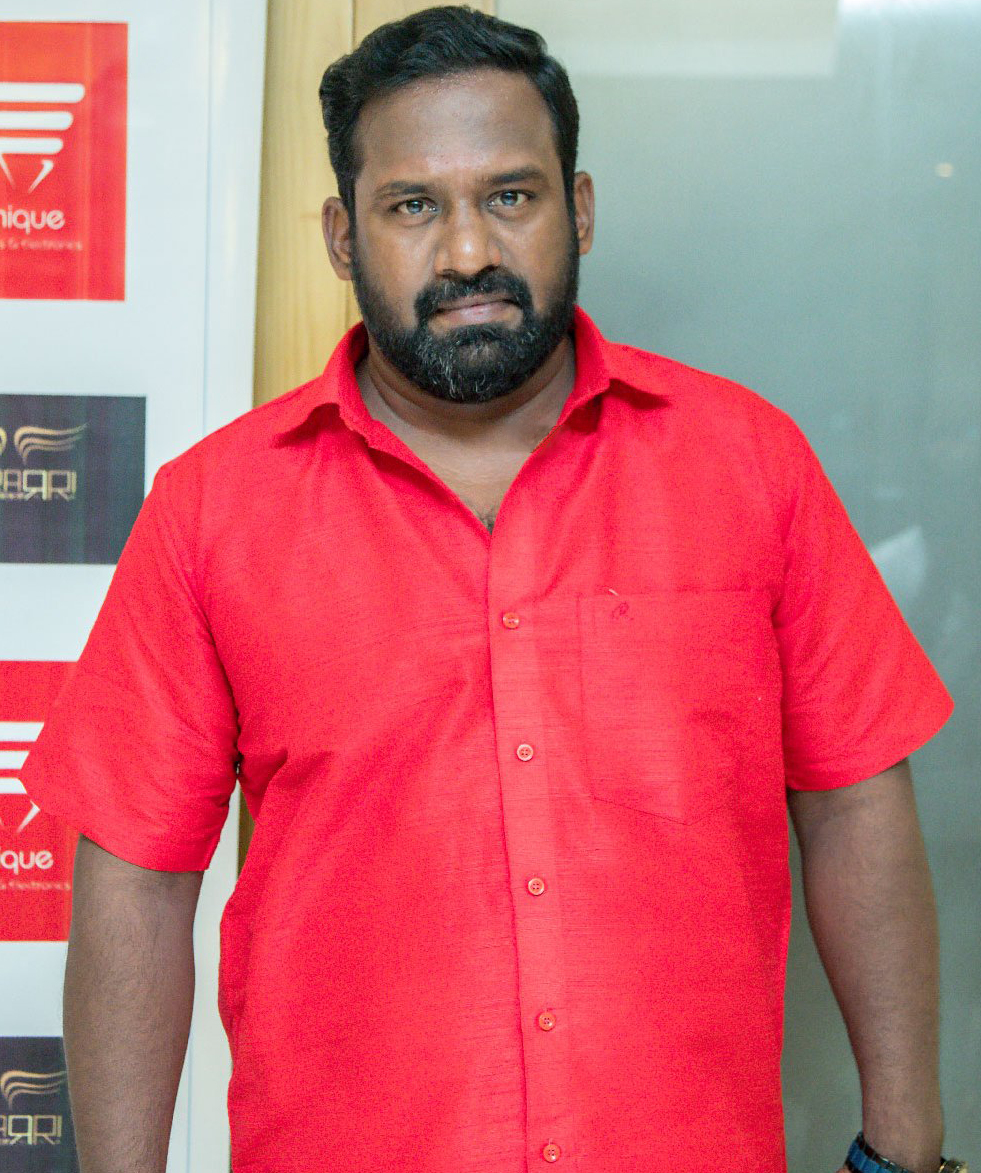
- Shankar in 2018
- Born: Shankar; 24 December 1978; Madurai, Tamil Nadu, India
- Died: 18 September 2025 (aged 46); Chennai, Tamil Nadu, India
- Education: Madurai Kamaraj University (MA Economics)
- Occupations: Actor, stand-up comedian, dancer
- Years active: 1997–2025
- Known for: Collaborations with Vijay TV
- Spouse: Priyanka Robo Shankar (m. 2002–2025)
- Children: Indraja

Robo Shankar (24 December 1978 – 18 September 2025) was an Indian stand-up comedian and actor who appeared predominantly in Tamil films and television. Making his breakthrough with Star Vijay's Kalakka Povathu Yaaru? by performing stand-up comedy, he was cast regularly in several shows on Star Vijay and has presented television shows for the channel. He was also the voice-over for Pumbaa in the official Tamil dub of The Lion King (2019) and Mufasa (2024).

== Career ==
Shankar was born in Madurai on 24 December 1978. He earned the name Robo Shankar after performing robot dances in village shows. He was a mimicry artist and initially performed on Kalakka Povathu Yaaru? and the 'Siricha Pochu' segment of Athu Ithu Ethu. He was offered by Gokul a role in Rowthiram (2011); however, many of his scenes were edited out from the film barring a song appearance.

Gokul again cast him in a role, Idharkuthane Aasaipattai Balakumara (2013), which gave him a break as an actor. After doing small roles in Yaaruda Mahesh and Kappal, Balaji Mohan cast Shankar in Vaayai Moodi Pesavum (2014). He portrayed a negative character in Touring Talkies (2015). He then acted in Maari (2015), where his performance was mentioned by critics that he "deserves a special mention" and "steals the show with his unique one-liners and body language". His performance as an MLA who undergoes a coma in Velainu Vandhutta Vellaikaaran (2016) was well received with critics describing his performance as "a scream" and "the most show-stopping, laugh-till-you-cry — and yes, BP-reducing — comedy stretch of the year".

== Personal life ==
Shankar's daughter Indraja Shankar made her acting debut in Bigil, as one of the women football players and also a castaway in Zee Tamil's Survivor show. His wife Priyanka Shankar is also an actor and playback singer. In 2023, several netizens expressed concern after he lost extra weight due to jaundice while on his weight loss journey.

== Death ==
On 18 September 2025, Shankar collapsed on the set of the film GodsJilla in Chennai and was admitted to GEM hospital, Perungudi. He was placed in intensive care after fluctuations in blood pressure and died later that day, at the age of 46. He died due to massive gastrointestinal bleed and multi-organ dysfunction. His body was taken to his residence in Valasaravakkam, Chennai, where his funeral was held.

== Filmography ==
- All films are in Tamil language unless otherwise noted.

Year	Film	Role	Source
1997	Dharma Chakkaram	Unknown	Uncredited
1999	Padayappa	Dancer	Uncredited appearance in the song "En Peru Padayappa"
2003	Joot	Aditya's henchman	Uncredited
2003	Uyirosai	Police officer	Uncredited
2004	Aai	Army man	Uncredited
2005	Karkaa Kasadara	Annachi's henchman	
2006	Chennai Kadhal	Police Inspector	
2007	Deepavali	Billu's friend	
2007	Madurai Veeran	Himself	
2010	Azhukkan		
2011	Rowthiram	Kittu's henchman	
2012	Akilan	Boxer	
2013	Thirumathi Thamizh	Himself	Cameo appearance
2013	Yaaruda Mahesh	Gopal	
2013	Azhagan Azhagi	Alasunder	
2013	Idharkuthane Aasaipattai Balakumara	Sound Shankar	
2014	Vaayai Moodi Pesavum	Matta Ravi	
2014	Chinnan Chiriya Vanna Paravai		
2014	Kappal	Seenu Anna	
2015	Touring Talkies	Chinnaiyya	Anthology film; segment Selvi 5am Vaguppu
2015	Rombha Nallavan Da Nee	Bhaskar's friend	
2015	Moone Moonu Varthai	Veera Dheera Parakrama Sivasubramani / Veerasamy	
2015	Maari	Sanikizhamai	
2015	Strawberry	Arnold	
2015	Yatchan		
2015	Maya	Shankar	
2015	Trisha Illana Nayanthara	Auto Driver	
2015	Puli	Albert	
2015	Maiem	Shankar	
2015	Muthukumar Wanted		Malaysian film; cameo appearance in a song
2016	Saagasam		Cameo appearance
2016	Aarathu Sinam	ACP Sarguna Pandian	
2016	Jithan 2	Vela Ramamoorthy	
2016	Sutta Pazham Sudatha Pazham	Kidnapper	
2016	Velainu Vandhutta Vellaikaaran	MLA Jacket Janakiraman	Tamil Nadu State Film Award for Best Comedian
2016	Ka Ka Ka Po	Raghavan	
2016	Ammani	Yaman	
2016	Kadavul Irukaan Kumaru	Mayilswamy	
2016	Virumandikkum Sivanandikkum	V. Vela Ramamoorthy	
2016	Pazhaya Vannarapettai		
2016	Veera Sivaji	Suresh	
2017	Si3	Subba Rao "Subbu"	
2017	Pa. Pandi	Actor	Cameo appearance
2017	Saravanan Irukka Bayamaen	Saudaswaran	Guest appearance
2017	Savarikkadu	Master's troupe member	
2017	Velaikkaran	Chinna Thambi	
2017	Sakka Podu Podu Raja	Sathya's henchman	
2018	Mannar Vagaiyara	Attack Durai	
2018	Kalakalappu 2	Ganesh's foster father's brother-in-law	
2018	Irumbu Thirai	Kathir's uncle	
2018	Bhaskar Oru Rascal	Arnold	
2018	Jarugandi	Gajendran	
2018	Maari 2	Sanikazhamai	
2019	Viswasam	Merit	
2019	Vantha Rajavathaan Varuven	Bucket	
2019	Nethraa	Actor	
2019	Mr. Local	Kuthala Sithambaram	
2019	Butler Balu	Kalyanam's assistant	
2019	Hero	Inbaraj "Ink"	
2020	Kanni Maadam	—N/a	Playback singer for the song "Moonu Kaalu Vaaganam"
2020	Kanni Raasi	Manmadhan	
2021	Kalathil Santhippom	Puli	
2021	Kutty Story	Prabhakar	
2021	Chakra	Kumar	
2021	Devadas Brothers	Lakshman	
2021	Cinderella	Guru	
2021	Plan Panni Pannanum	Manmadhan	
2022	Yutha Satham	Police Constable Selvam	
2022	Iravin Nizhal	Paramaanandha	Tamil Nadu State Film Award for Best Comedian
2022	The Legend	Thirupathi	
2022	Cobra	Madhi / Kathir's friend	
2023	Kodai	Paandi	
2023	Tamilarasan	Nambirajan	
2023	Partner	Samadhanam	
2023	Are You Ok Baby?	Sollaadhadhum Unmai participant	
2024	Singapore Saloon	Shami / Ragavan	
2024	Boomer Uncle	Minor Kunju	
2024	Jolly O Gymkhana	Adaikalaraj's henchman	
2025	Ambi	Sundharam	
2025	Desingu Raja 2	Vijay	
2025	Sotta Sotta Nanaiyuthu	Kulukkal Kumaresan	
2025	Kiss Me Idiot	Ticket Thanikachalam	Posthumous release; partially reshot version
2025	Saaraa	Security Raju	Posthumous release
2026	Commandovin Love Story	S. Ranjith	Posthumous release
TBA	GodsJilla †	TBA	Posthumous release

=== Dubbing artist ===
Year	Film	Role	Notes	Ref.
2019	The Lion King	Pumbaa	Tamil dubbed version	
2024	Mufasa: The Lion King	Pumbaa	Tamil dubbed version	

=== Television ===
Year	Program Name	Role	Channel	Notes and Ref.
2007	Kalakka Povathu Yaaru? Season 3	Contestant	Star Vijay	
2007	Asatha Povathu Yaaru?	Contestant	Sun TV	
2008	Kalakka Povathu Yaaru? Season 4	Contestant	Star Vijay	
2009	Athu Ithu Ethu Season 1	Contestant	Star Vijay	
2011	Kings of Comedy Season 1	Contestant	Star Vijay	
2017	Athu Ithu Ethu Season 2	Contestant	Star Vijay	
2018	Kings of Comedy Juniors	Judge	Star Vijay	
2020	Time Enna Boss	Killi	Amazon Prime	
2020	Idhayathai Thirudathey	Himself	Colors Tamil	
2020	Kannana Kanne	Guest	Sun TV	with Indraja Shankar
2021	Kanni Theevu (Ullasa Ulagam 2.0)	Jalsha	Colors Tamil	
2022	Sembaruthi	Bhuvaneshwari's husband	Zee Tamil	
2022	Kalakka Povathu Yaaru? Champions 3	Judge	Star Vijay	
2022	Raju Vootla Party	Guest	Star Vijay	
2023	Vera Maari Office	BP	Aha	Special appearance
2024	Cooku with Comali season 5	Guest	Star Vijay	
2025	Top Cooku Dupe Cooku season 2	Contestant	Sun TV	Eliminated week 4
2025	Athu Ithu Ethu season 4	Guest	Star Vijay	Final television appearance
