= Athu Ithu Ethu =

- Genre: Comedy show
- Written by: S. Thomson; Ravi (S3)
- Directed by: S. Thomson
- Presented by: Sivakarthikeyan; Ma Ka Pa Anand
- Country of origin: India
- Original language: Tamil
- No. of seasons: 3

Production
- Producer: S. Thomson
- Camera setup: Multi-camera
- Running time: approx. 55-60 minutes per episode
- Production company: Dream Big Production

Original release
- Network: Star Vijay
- Release: 5 June 2009 – present

Athu Ithu Ethu (transl. That This Which) is a 2009 Indian Tamil-language reality comedy and game show that airs on Star Vijay and streams on Disney+ Hotstar. Hosted by Sivakarthikeyan (former) and Ma Ka Pa Anand, the first season of the show premiered on 5 June 2009. Over fifteen years, Athu Ithu Ethu has rolled out three seasons.

== Overview ==
Season	Episodes	Original Broadcast		Host
Season	Episodes	First Aired	Last Aired	Host
1	394	5 June 2009	27 March 2017	Sivakarthikeyan / Ma Ka Pa Anand
2	74	29 July 2017	24 February 2019	Ma Ka Pa Anand
3	24	31 March 2024	8 September 2024	Ma Ka Pa Anand
4	24	24 August 2025	TBA	Ma Ka Pa Anand

== Season 1 ==
The first season of Athu Ithu Ethu was aired on 6 June 2009 to 25 March 2017. The show host was Sivakarthikeyan.

=== Comedians ===
- Robo Shankar
- Vadivel Balaji
- Amuthavanan
- 'Singapore' Deepan
- Pazhani Pattalam
- Rambo Ramar
- Hulk George
- Diwakar
- Vignesh Karthick
- Prabu
- Jeyachandran
- Nanjil Vijayan

== Season 2 ==
The second season of Athu Ithu Ethu was aired on 29 July 2017 to 24 February 2019. Ma Ka Pa Anand has officially once again been appointed as the host for the second time. Four celebrities will participate in two teams. The program involves three Rounds: (Sing in the Rain, Siricha Pochu and 5 Endrathukulla).

== Season 3 ==
Athu Ithu Ethu returned with its third season after five years. It began broadcasting on 31 March 2024 and aired on every Sunday at 13:30. There are three rounds (Sing In The Rain, Siricha Pochu and Kakaka Po). Ma Ka Pa Anand has officially once again been appointed as the host for the third time. The show was ended on 8 September 2024 with 24 episodes.

== Season 4 ==
The 4th season of the Athu Ithu Ethu show, it is premiere on 24 August 2025 on every Sunday at 14:00. Ma Ka Pa Anand has officially once again been appointed as the host.
