= Reshma Pasupuleti =

Indian actress (Born: 23 July 1983)

- Born: Reshma Pasupuleti; 23 July 1983 (age 43)
- Occupations: Actress; anchor
- Years active: 2008–present
- Works: Baakiyalakshmi
- Relatives: Bobby Simha

Reshma Pasupuleti (born 23 July 1983) is an Indian actress who primarily appears in Tamil language films and TV series. She started her career as an anchor and news reporter for a Telugu TV channel. She began her TV career in Tamil through Vamsam. In 2016, She acted in Vishnu Vishal's Velainu Vandhutta Vellaikaaran in a supporting role.

== Early life ==
Reshma Pasupuleti was born into a Telugu-speaking family to Prasad Pasupuleti, a Telugu film producer in Kanchipuram . Pasupuleti pursued her education abroad, first in Arkansas, and then completed her engineering degree in the computer science department from the Texas A&M University. She joined Amitysoft Software Institution for a course on software testing and later also briefly worked as an air hostess with Delta Air Lines.

== Career ==
Pasupuleti began working as a news anchor English news for TV5. She was then cast on the Tamil series Vamsam.

Pasupuleti appeared in Masala Padam (2015), playing the heroine. She subsequently appeared in several more films, notably playing a news reader in Ko 2 (2016) and a comedy role in Velainu Vandhutta Vellaikaaran (2016) alongside Soori. She then appeared in Girls (2016), a Tamil and Malayalam bilingual, about illicit relationships. In 2019, Pasupuleti appeared on the reality television show, Bigg Boss 3 and was evicted on day 49 of the show.

== Filmography ==
- All films are in Tamil, unless otherwise noted.

Year	Film	Role	Notes
2015	Masala Padam	Reshma	Film Debut
2016	Velainu Vandhutta Vellaikaaran	Pushpa	Supporting Role; Credited as Pushpa
2016	Ko 2	Shobana	
2016	Manal Kayiru 2	Chandra	
2016	Girls	Clara	Malayalam film
2016	Thiraikku Varadha Kathai	Clara	
2021	Vanakkam Da Mappilei	Maya	
2021	Pei Mama	Geetha	
2021	3:33	Devi	
2022	Highway	Jaya	Telugu film
2023	Sathiya Sothanai	Pradeep's sister	
2023	Sooragan	Lakshmi	
2024	Rajakili	Chinthamani	

== Television ==
=== Serials ===
Year	Title	Role	Channel	Language
2009–2011	Love	Divya	Maa TV	Telugu
2013-2014	Vani Rani	Devika	Sun TV	Tamil
2014–2017	Vamsam	Supriya	Sun TV	Tamil
2014–2015	Maragatha Veenai	Dhivya	Sun TV	Tamil
2014–2015	10 Manik Kadhaigal (Karai)	Rathi	Sun TV	Tamil
2014–2015	En Iniya Thozhiye	Paari	Raj TV	Tamil
2014–2015	Uyirmei	Sumathi	Zee Tamil	Tamil
2015	Sundharakandam	Shakthi (Special Appearance)	Vendhar TV	Tamil
2015–2016	Andal Azhagar	Malarvizhi "Malar"	Star Vijay	Tamil
2015–2016	Pagal Nilavu	Malarvizhi "Malar"	Star Vijay	Tamil
2020	Uyire	DSP Vasundhara Devi (Special Appearance)	Colors Tamil	Tamil
2020–2021	Anbe Vaa	Vandhana	Sun TV	Tamil
2020;2021	Kannana Kanne	Vandhana (Special Appearance)	Sun TV	Tamil
2021	Velammal	Nagavalli	Star Vijay	Tamil
2021–2025	Baakiyalakshmi	Radhika	Star Vijay	Tamil
2021–2022	Pandian Stores	Radhika (Special Appearance)	Star Vijay	Tamil
2021–2022	Abhi Tailor	Anamika	Colors Tamil	Tamil
2021	Neethane Enthan Ponvasantham	Mohini (Special Appearance)	Zee Tamil	Tamil
2023–2024	Seetha Raman	Mahalakshmi/Nancy	Zee Tamil	Tamil
2024	Pandian Stores 2	Radhika (Special Appearance)	Star Vijay	Tamil
2024–present	Karthigai Deepam	Chamundeshwari	Zee Tamil	Tamil
2025–2026	Magale En Marumagale	Abirami Naachiyar	Star Vijay	Tamil

=== Shows ===
Year	Programme / Show	Role	Channel	Language	Notes
2013–2014	Sun Singer	Anchor	Sun TV	Tamil	
2019	Bigg Boss Tamil 3	Contestant	Star Vijay		Evicted Day 43
2019	Bigg Boss Tamil 3 Celebration	Herself	Star Vijay		
2020	Vanakkam Tamizha	Herself	Sun TV		
	Vanakkam Tamizha	Herself	Sun TV		
2021	Vada da	Herself	Sun Music		
2021	Genes	Herself	Zee Tamil		
2021	Chat box	Herself	Sun Music		
2022	Pottikku Potti	Herself	Colors Tamil		
2022	Raju Vootla Party	Herself	Star Vijay		
2022	Oo Solriya Oo Oohm Solriya	Herself	Star Vijay		
2022	Anda Ka Kasam	Herself	Star Vijay		
2023	Start Music 4	Herself	Star Vijay		
2023	Kalakka Povathu Yaaru? Champions	Judge	Star Vijay		

=== Web series ===
Year	Title	Role	Channel	Language
2022	Vilangu	Selvi	ZEE5	Tamil
2024	My Perfectt Husband	Vimala "Vimal"	Disney+ Hotstar	Tamil
