= Sameera Sherief =

Indian television actress and producer

- Born: 14 November 1988 (age 37); Hyderabad, Andhra Pradesh
- Occupations: Actress, producer
- Years active: 2006 - present
- Known for: Pagal Nilavu, Rekka Katti Parakkudhu Manasu
- Spouse: Syed Anwar Ahmed (m. 2019)
- Relatives: Shanoor Sana (mother-in-law)

Sameera Sherief is an Indian television actress and producer known for her work in Telugu and Tamil television. She began her acting career with the Telugu serial Aadapilla in 2006, and went on to appear in shows such as Bharayamani, Prathibimbam, and Mangamma Gari Manavaralu. In Tamil television, she gained recognition for her lead roles in Pagal Nilavu (2016) and Rekka Katti Parakkudhu Manasu (2018), winning the Vijay Television Award for Favourite Find for Pagal Nilavu. She married her Pagal Nilavu co-star Syed Anwar in 2019, and the couple have a son, Arhaan, born in 2021.

== Television ==
Year	Title	Role	Language	Channel	Notes
2006-2008	Aadapilla	Akshaya	Telugu	ETV	
2007	Jeevitham	Girija	Telugu	ETV	
2009-2014	Bharyamani	Iswarya	Telugu	ETV	
2010-2011	Muddu Bidda	Kalpana	Telugu	Zee Telugu	
2010	Dr.Chakravarthy	Varuna	Telugu	Zee Telugu	
2011-2021	Manasu Mamatha	Chandu/Karuna	Telugu	ETV	
2013	Moodu Mulla Bandham		Telugu	Gemini TV	
2014-2015	Prathibimbam		Telugu	Gemini TV	
2016	Mangamma Gari Manavaralu		Telugu	Zee Telugu	
2016	Thodi Kodallu		Telugu	Gemini TV	
2016-2019	Pagal Nilavu	Sakthi	Tamil	Star Vijay	
2017-2019	Rekka Katti Parakkudhu Manasu	Malar	Tamil	Zee Tamil	Also producer
2020	Mr and Mrs Chinnathirai Season 2	Contestant	Tamil	Star Vijay	
2021	Aravindha Sametha	Neeraja	Telugu	Gemini TV	
