= Myna Nandhini =

Indian actress

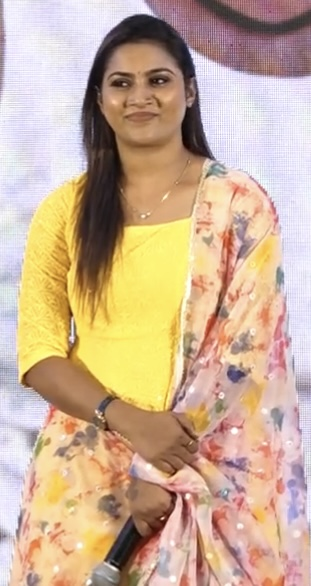
- Born: Nandhini Rajendran; 21 May 1991 (age 35); Madurai, Tamil Nadu, India
- Occupations: Actress; Television personality
- Years active: 2009–present
- Notable work: Saravanan Meenatchi (season 3); Aranmanai 3
- Spouse: Karthikeyan (m. 2017; died 2017) Yogeswaram (m. 2019)
- Children: 1
- Relatives: Dinesh Kanagaratnam (cousin)

Myna Nandhini (born 21 May) is an Indian actress and television personality who predominantly appears in Tamil films and television shows. She is best known as Myna Revathi in Saravanan Meenatchi (season 2), Alabarai Myna in Chinna Thambi and for her major breakthrough role Mynavathi in Aranmanai 3 (2021). She is also the winner of the cooking show Kitchen Super Star (season 3) which aired on Star Vijay in 2015. In 2022, she participated in Bigg Boss 6 as a contestant.

She is best known for her roles in films such as Vamsam (2010), Kedi Billa Killadi Ranga (2013), Romeo Juliet (2015), Kanchana 3 (2019), Namma Veettu Pillai (2019), Petromax (2019), Aranmanai 3 (2021) and Vikram (2022).

== Early life ==
Born as Nandhini Rajendran to her parents Rajendran and Rani on 21 May in a remote town in Madurai, Tamil Nadu. Nandhini went on to study at Meenakshi Matriculation School, Madurai and Ambiga College of Arts and Science, Anna Nagar where she completed her Bachelor of Business Administration (BBA) degree. However after completing her degree she decided to act in few television drama's as a "Time killer".

== Career ==
Nandhini debuted her career as an actress in the film Vennila Kabadi Kuzhu as an uncredited role in the film. She later made her television debut with the comedy reality show Kalakka Povathu Yaaru where she participated as a contestant. In 2010, she was approached by director Pandiraj who offered her a role in his film Vamsam she later agreed to the offer and played the supporting role of Sarasu. She later also appeared in films such as Kedi Billa Killadi Ranga (2013), Vellaikaara Durai (2014) and Romeo Juliet. In 2016, she made her debut as an actress in television by appearing in the soap opera Saravanan Meenatchi (season 3) playing the role of a friend to female protagonist, her role in the drama was highly credited and praised. Her name in that role "Myna" got popular afterwards. She also appeared in television shows such as Amudha Oru Aacharyakuri, Pandian Stores, Aranmanai Kili and Chinna Thambi. In 2022, actor Kamal Haasan approached Nandhini offering her a crucial role in his action film Vikram she later accepted the offer and starred opposing actor Vijay Sethupathi in the film. Later that year she also appeared in the film Sardar appearing as a cameo role as a drama artist in the film.

She also played a crucial role in the 2021 web series November Story alongside actors Tamannaah, G. M. Kumar and Pasupathy. The web series also marked Nandhini's debut web series.

== Personal life ==
In 2017, Nandhini married her long time boyfriend Karthikeyan (Karthick) in January. However 6 months into their marriage Karthick committed suicide after a misunderstanding among the couple. In 2019 she re married this time to television actor and comedian Yogeswaran, in 2020 the couple was blessed with a child. She is also the cousin of Sri lankan singer and songwriter Dinesh Kanagaratnam.

== Filmography ==
=== Films ===
Year	Title	Role	Notes
2009	Vennila Kabadi Kuzhu		
2010	Vamsam	Saraswathy	
2011	Minsaram	Jaya's friend	
2011	Veppam		
2013	Kedi Billa Killadi Ranga	Sindru's wife	
2014	Vellaikaara Durai	Pandi's wife	
2015	Romeo Juliet	Divya Shree	
2019	Kanchana 3	Durga	
2019	Namma Veettu Pillai	Kottravai	
2019	Petromax	Shailaja	
2020	Oru Madhiri Irukku	Karthika	Short film
2021	Aranmanai 3	Mynavathi (Myna)	
2022	Vikram	Kaikeyi Sandhanam	
2022	Viruman	Muthukutty's wife	
2022	Sardar	Valli	
2023	Partner	Sengamalam	
2025	Good Day	Krishnaveni	
2025	Thalaivan Thalaivii	Nynavathi	
2026	Mookuthi Amman 2	Nandhini	

=== Television shows ===
Year	Title	Role	Notes
2012	Samayal Mandhiram	Host	
2015	Kalakka Povadhu Yaaru Season 5	Judge	
2015	Kitchen Super Star (season 3)	Contestant	Winner
2016	Mr & Mrs Khiladis	Contestant	
2016	Naduvula Konjan Disturb Pannuvom	Participant	
2016 - 2017	Dance Jodi Dance Season 1	Participant	4th Runner-up
2018	Comedy Khiladis	Judge	
2019	Mr and Mrs Chinnathirai 1	Host	
2019-2020	Kalakka Povathu Yaaru? Champions 2	Judge	
2022	Kalakka Povathu Yaaru? Champions 3	Judge	
2021	Mr and Mrs Chinnathirai 3	Contestant along with Yogeshwaran	1st Runner-up
2022	Super Singer Junior	Host	Replaced by Priyanka Deshpande
2022	Oo Solriya Oo Oohm Solriya	Contestant	Winner
2022	Anda Ka Kasam	Contestant	Winner
2022–2023	Bigg Boss Tamil Season 6	Contestant	Evicted Day 103
2023	Bigg Boss Kondattam	Herself	
2026–present	Killadi Jodis	Herself	

=== Television Serials ===
Year	Title	Role	Channel	Notes			
2007	Nadaswaram		Sun TV	2012	Azhagi	Ranjini	Sun TV
2012-2013	Amudha Oru Aacharyakuri	Preetha	Kalaignar TV				
2013	Maruthani	Episode 202	Sun TV				
2013 - 2016	Saravanan Meenatchi (season 2)	Revathi (Myna)	Vijay Television				
2014 - 2015	Kalyanam Mudhal Kadhal Varai	Shruti Jai	Vijay Television	Replaced by Rhema Ashok			
2016 - 2017	Saravanan Meenatchi (season 3)	Madonna	Vijay Television				
2017	Neeli		Vijay Television				
2017-2019	Chinna Thambi	Alabarai Myna	Vijay Television	Episode Appearance 355- 370			
2018-2020	Aranmanai Kili	Vijaya	Vijay Television				
2019	Pandian Stores	Padma	Vijay Television	Cameo Appearance			
2020-2021	Velaikkaran	Madurai Meena	Vijay Television				

=== Web series ===
Year	Title	Role	Notes
2021	November Story	Chithra	JioHotstar series
2024	Chutney Sambar	Amudha	JioHotstar series
2025	Police Police	Murali's mother	JioHotstar series
