= List of programmes broadcast by Colors Tamil =

This is a list of original programmes broadcast on the Indian television Tamil channel Colors Tamil.

== Former broadcast ==
=== Soap operas ===
| Series | Premiere date | Last aired | Ref. |
|---|---|---|---|
| Abhi Tailor | 19 July 2021 | 19 August 2022 | |
| Amman | 27 January 2020 | 1 July 2022 | |
| Enga Veetu Meenakshi | 18 October 2021 | 26 March 2022 | |
| Idhayathai Thirudathe | 14 February 2020 | 3 June 2022 | |
| Idhu Solla Marandha Kadhai | 7 March 2022 | 23 September 2022 | |
| Jagame Thanthiram Kadhaigal | 27 December 2021 | 30 January 2022 | |
| Jamelaa | 10 October 2022 | 12 January 2023 | |
| Kanda Naal Mudhal | 13 June 2022 | 30 December 2022 | |
| Manthira Punnagai | 1 August 2022 | 25 November 2022 | |
| Malar | 1 April 2019 | 16 November 2019 | |
| Meera | 28 March 2022 | 22 July 2022 | |
| Namma Madurai Sisters | 21 February 2022 | 23 September 2022 | |
| Oru Kadhai Padattuma Sir | 18 April 2018 | 15 June 2018 | |
| Oviya | 26 November 2018 | 3 September 2020 | |
| Pachakili | 4 July 2022 | 9 December 2022 | |
| Perazhagi | 20 February 2018 | 21 December 2019 | |
| Sillunu Oru Kaadhal | 4 January 2021 | 28 October 2022 | |
| Sivagami | 20 February 2018 | 21 December 2019 | |
| Thari | 1 April 2019 | 16 November 2019 | |
| Thirumanam | 8 October 2018 | 16 October 2020 | |
| Uyire | 2 January 2020 | 7 April 2021 | |
| Valli Thirumanam | 3 January 2022 | 9 December 2022 | |
| Vandhal Sridevi | 11 April 2018 | 28 June 2019 | |
| Velunachi | 20 February 2018 | 26 July 2018 | |

=== Dubbed series ===
- Jai Shri Krishna
- Chandrakanta
- Pishachini
- Shiva Shakthi Thiruvilayal Shiv Shakti - Tap Tyaag Tandav
- Naagini 1,2,3,4,5,6 (S7 acquired by Star Vijay ) Naagin
- Lakshmi Narayana Namo Namaha Lakshmi Narayan

== Reality shows ==
- 7up Thamizh Naattin Kural
- Enga Veetu Mapillai
- Colors Super Kids
- Kodeeswari
- Pottikku Potti
- Vellum Thiramai
- Dance vs Dance
- Sarkaar With Jiiva
