= 2022 in Tamil television =

The following is a list of events affecting Tamil language television in 2022 (from India, Sri Lanka, Singapore and the Tamil diaspora). Events listed include television show debuts and finales; channel launches and closures; stations changing or adding their network affiliations; and information about changes of ownership of channels or stations.

== Events and new channels ==
=== October ===
Date	Event	Ref
10	Star Vijay Music channel was rebranded as 'Star Vijay Takkar' on 10 October 2022. It is a 24×7 Indian Tamil youth oriented entertainment television channel.	

=== December ===
Date	Event	Ref
14	Chithiram TV channel was rebranded as 'Blacksheep TV' on 14 December 2022.	
18	Viacom18 broadcasts the 2022 FIFA World Cup live.	

== Ongoing series and shows ==
Series	First aired	Ref
Sun TV
Series
Magarasi	21 October 2019	
Thalattu	26 April 2021	
Thirumagal	12 October 2020	
Sevvanthi	11 July 2022	
Priyamaana Thozhi	30 May 2022	
Pandavar Illam	15 July 2019	
Ilakkiya	10 October 2022	
Aruvi	18 October 2021	
Abhiyum Naanum	26 October 2020	
Anandha Ragam	29 August 2022	
Sundari	22 February 2021	
Kayal	25 October 2021	
Vanathai Pola	7 December 2020	
Kannana Kanne	2 November 2020	
Iniya	5 December 2022	
Ethirneechal	7 February 2022	
Anbe Vaa	2 November 2020	
Shows
Vanakkam Tamizha	4 December 2017	
Maathi Yosi	27 February 2022	
Star Vijay
Series
Kaatrukkenna Veli	18 January 2021	
Kanne Kalaimaane	10 October 2022	
Chellamma	9 May 2022	
Namma Veetu Ponnu	16 August 2021	
Thendral Vandhu Ennai Thodum	16 August 2021	
Muthazhagu	15 November 2021	
Mouna Raagam 2	1 February 2021	
Thamizhum Saraswathiyum	12 July 2021	
Raja Rani 2	12 October 2020	
Eeramana Rojave 2	17 January 2022	
Pandian Stores	1 October 2018	
Baakiyalakshmi	27 July 2020	
Bharathi Kannamma	25 February 2019	
Shows
Neeya Naana	7 May 2006	
Anda Ka Kasam	14 August 2022	
Oo Solriya Oo Oohm Solriya	4 September 2022	
Bigg Boss Tamil Season 6	9 October 2022	
Zee Tamil
Series
Indira	21 November 2022	
Kanaa	21 November 2022	
Kannathil Muthamittal	11 April 2022	
Deivam Thantha Poove	13 December 2021	
Rettai Roja	12 August 2019	
Thavamai Thavamirunthu	18 April 2022	
Peranbu	13 December 2021	
Amudhavum Annalakshmiyum	4 July 2022	
Ninaithale Inikkum	23 August 2021	
Maari	4 July 2022	
Vidhya No.1	27 December 2021	
Karthigai Deepam	5 December 2022	
Meenakshi Ponnunga	1 August 2022	
Rajini	27 December 2021	
Shows
Olimayamana Ethirkaalam	2014	
Arputham Tharum Alayangal	2014	
Tamizha Tamizha	11 November 2018	
Super Mom 3	4 November 2018	
Sa Re Ga Ma Pa 3	18 December 2022	
Colors Tamil
Jamelaa	10 October 2022	
Ullathai Allitha	10 October 2022	
Naagini 6	12 March 2022	
Kolangal	16 May 2022	Re-telecast
Thendral	16 May 2022	Re-telecast
Kalaignar TV
Ponni C/O Rani	27 June 2022	
Kannedhirey Thondrinal	27 June 2022	
Vani Rani	19 July 2021	Re-telecast
Kula Deivam	5 September 2022	Re-telecast
Deivamagal	1 March 2021	Re-telecast
Nadhaswaram	5 September 2022	Re-telecast
Thirumathi Selvam	29 March 2021	Re-telecast
Pasamalar	12 December 2022	Re-telecast

== New series and shows ==
=== Soap operas ===
Opening		Title	Tamil title	Network(s)	Ref
January	3	Valli Thirumanam	வள்ளி திருமணம்	Colors Tamil	
January	17	Eeramana Rojave 2	ஈரமான ரோஜாவே 2	Star Vijay	
February	7	Ethirneechal	எதிர்நீச்சல்	Sun TV	
February	7	Ayalan	அயலான்	Mediacorp Vasantham	
February	21	Namma Madurai Sisters	நம்ம மதுரை சிஸ்டர்ஸ்	Colors Tamil	
March	7	Idhu Solla Marandha Kadhai	இது சொல்ல மறந்த கதை	Colors Tamil	
March	14	Thiruvai Malarvai 2	திருவாய் மலர்வாய் 2	Mediacorp Vasantham	
March	28	Meera	மீரா	Colors Tamil	
April	11	Kannathil Muthamittal	கன்னத்தில் முத்தமிட்டாள்	Zee Tamil	
April	18	Sippikul Muthu	சிப்பிக்குள் முத்து	Star Vijay	
April	18	Thavamai Thavamirundhu	தவமாய் தவமிருந்து	Zee Tamil	
May	9	Chellamma	செல்லம்மா	Star Vijay	
May	30	Priyamaana Thozhi	பிரியமான தோழி	Sun TV	
June	13	Kanda Naal Mudhal	கண்ட நாள் முதல்	Colors Tamil	
June	20	Bharatidasan Colony	பாரதிதாசன் காலனி	Star Vijay	
June	27	Ponni C/O Rani	பொன்னி சி/ஓ ராணி	Kalaignar TV	
June	27	Kannedhirey Thondrinal	கண்ணெதிரே தொண்டினால்	Kalaignar TV	
July	4	Pachakili	பச்சக்கிளி	Colors Tamil	
July	4	Amudhavum Annalakshmiyum	அமுதவும் அன்னலட்சுமியும்	Zee Tamil	
July	4	Maari	மாரி	Zee Tamil	
July	11	Vaadi Rasathi	வாடி ராசாத்தி	Captain TV	
July	11	Sevvanthi	செவ்வந்தி	Sun TV	
August	1	Meenakshi Ponnunga	மீனாட்சி பொண்ணுங்க	Zee Tamil	
August	1	Manthira Punnagai	மந்திர புன்னகை	Colors Tamil	
August	29	Anandha Ragam	ஆனந்த ராகம்	Sun TV	
October	10	Kanne Kalaimaane	கண்ணே கலைமானே	Star Vijay	
October	10	Ilakkiya	இலக்கியா	Sun TV	
October	10	Jamelaa	ஜமீலா	Colors Tamil	
October	10	Ullathai Allitha	உள்ளத்தை அள்ளித்தா	Colors Tamil	
November	21	Indira	இந்திரா	Zee Tamil	
November	21	Kanaa	கனா	Zee Tamil	
December	4	Nethra	நேத்ரா	Sun TV	
December	5	Iniya	இனியா	Sun TV	
December	5	Karthigai Deepam	கார்த்திகை தீபம்	Zee Tamil	
December	21	Aathmaan	ஆத்மான்	Mediacorp Vasantham	

=== Shows ===
Opening		Title	Tamil title	Network(s)	Ref
January	22	Cooku with Comali 3	குக்கு வித் கோமாளி	Star Vijay	
February	20	Kalakka Povathu Yaaru Champions 3	கலக்க போவது யாரு சாம்பியன்ஸ் 3	Star Vijay	
February	27	Run Baby Run	ரன் பேபி ரன்	Zee Tamil	
February	27	Maathi Yosi	மாத்தி யோசி	Sun TV	
April	3	Pottikku Potti	போட்டிக்கு போட்டி	Colors Tamil	
May	8	BB Jodigal 2	பிபி ஜோடிகள் 2	Star Vijay	
June	4	Vellum Thiramai	வெல்லும் திறமை	Colors Tamil	
July	2	Mr and Mrs Chinnathirai 4	மிஸ்டர் அண்ட் மிசஸ் சின்னத்திரை 4	Star Vijay	
July	24	Raju Vootla Party	ராஜு வூட்லா பார்ட்டி	Star Vijay	
July	30	Dance Jodi Dance Reloaded	டான்ஸ் ஜோடி டான்ஸ் ரீலோடட்	Zee Tamil	
August	19	Anda Ka Kasam 1	அண்டாகாகசம்	Star Vijay	
September	4	Oo Solriya Oo Oohm Solriya	ஊ சொல்றியா ஓஓஓம் சொல்றியா	Star Vijay	
September	18	Super Samayal	சூப்பர் சமையல்	Sun TV	
October	3	Colors Kalakal Samayal	கலர்ஸ் கலக்கல் சமையல்	Colors Tamil	
October	9	Bigg Boss 6	பிக் பாஸ் 6	Star Vijay	
November	3	Super Mom 3	சூப்பர் மாம் 3	Zee Tamil	
November	19	Super Singer 9	சூப்பர் சிங்கர் 9	Star Vijay	
December	18	Sa Re Ga Ma Pa Seniors 3	ச ரி க ம பா சீனியர்ஸ்	Zee Tamil	

== Debut web series ==
Opening		Title	Tamil title	Director	Platform	Ref
January	14	Putham Pudhu Kaalai Vidiyaadhaa	புத்தம் புது காலை விடியாதா	Balaji Mohan, Halitha Shameem, Madhumitha, Surya Krishna, and Richard Anthony	Amazon Prime Video	
January	14	Aanandham Aarambham	ஆனந்தம் ஆரம்பம்	Jagan	Disney+ Hotstar	
January	30	Bigg Boss Ultimate 1	பிக் பாஸ் அல்டிமேட் 1		Disney+ Hotstar	
February	11	Akash Vaani	ஆகாஷ் வாணி	Enoc Able	Aha	
February	18	Irai	இறை	Rajesh M. Selva	Aha	
February	18	Vilangu	விலங்கு	Prasanth Pandiyaraj	ZEE5	
March	4	Ramany vs Ramany 3.0	ரமணி vs ரமணி 3.0	Naga	Aha Tamil	
April	22	Anantham	அனந்தம்		ZEE5	
April	22	Kana Kaanum Kaalangal	கனா காணும் காலங்கள்	Jaswini J.	Disney+ Hotstar	
May	21	Kuthukku Pathu	குத்துக்கு பத்து	Vijay Varadharaj	Aha	
June	17	Ammuchi 2	அம்மூச்சி 2	Rajeshwar Kalisamy	Aha	
June	17	Fingertip 2	பின்கேர்ட்ரிப்	S. Shivakar	ZEE5	
June	17	Suzhal: The Vortex	சுழல்	Bramma G, Anucharan	Amazon Prime Video	
July	22	Meme Boys	மீம் பாய்ஸ்	Arun Koushik	SonyLIV	
July	29	Paper Rocket	பேப்பர் ராக்கெட்	Kiruthiga Udhayanidhi	ZEE5	
August	5	Victim: Who Is Next?	விக்டிம்	Chimbudevan, M. Rajesh, Pa. Ranjith, Venkat Prabhu	SonyLIV	
August	12	Emoji	மோஜி	Sen S Rangasamy	Aha	
August	19	Tamil Rockerz	தமிழ்ராக்கர்ஸ்	Arivazhagan Venkatachalam	SonyLIV	
September	30	Mad Company	மேட் கம்பெனி	Vignesh Vijaykumar	Aha	
October	21	Pettaikaali	பேட்டைகாளி	Rajkumar	Aha	
November	4	Kaiyum Kalavum	கையும் களவு	Roju	SonyLIV	
November	18	Five Six Seven Eight	ஐந்து ஆறு ஏழு எட்டு	A. L. Vijay	ZEE5	
December	2	Vadhandhi	வதந்தி	Andrew Louis	Amazon Prime Video	
December	9	Fall	பால்		Disney+ Hotstar	

== Ending series and shows ==
=== Soap operas ===
Ending		Title	Tamil title	Network(s)	First aired	Ref
January	8	Thirumathi Hitler	திருமதி ஹிட்லர்	Zee Tamil	14 December 2020	
February	22	Vaidhegi Kaathirundhaal	வைதேகி காத்திருந்தாள்	Star Vijay	20 December 2021	
March	26	Enga Veetu Meenakshi	எங்க வீட்டு மீனாட்சி	Colors Tamil	18 October 2021	
April	13	Senthoora Poove	செந்தூரபூவே	Star Vijay	27 July 2020	
May	6	Endrendrum Punnagai	என்றென்றும் புன்னகை	Zee Tamil	16 March 2020	
May	14	Gokulathil Seethai	கோகுலத்தில் சீதை	Zee Tamil	4 November 2019	
May	20	Velaikkaran	வேலைக்காரன்	Star Vijay	7 December 2020	
May	27	Geethanjali	கீதாஞ்சலி	Raj TV	13 December 2021	
May	27	Nee Varuvai Ena?	நீ வருவாய் என?	Raj TV	19 April 2021	
May	28	Chithi 2	சித்தி 2	Sun TV	28 May 2022	
June	3	Idhayathai Thirudathe	இதயத்தை திருடதே	Colors Tamil	14 February 2020	
June	10	Naam Iruvar Namakku Iruvar	நாம் இருவர் நமக்கு இருவர்	Star Vijay	26 March 2018	
June	18	Poove Unakkaga	பூவே உனக்காக	Sun TV	10 August 2020	
July	1	Amman	அம்மன்	Colors Tamil	27 January 2020	
July	3	Anbe Sivam	அன்பே சிவம்	Zee Tamil	18 October 2021	
July	22	Meera	மீரா	Colors Tamil	28 March 2022	
July	31	Sembaruthi	செம்பருத்தி	Zee Tamil	16 October 2017	
August	19	Abhi Tailor	அபி டெய்லர்	Colors Tamil	19 July 2021	
August	27	Alavudeen	அலவுதீன்	Sun TV	29 September 2019	
September	23	Namma Madurai Sisters	நம்ம மதுரை சிஸ்டர்ஸ்	Colors Tamil	21 February 2022	
September	23	Idhu Solla Marandha Kadhai	இது சொல்ல மறந்த கதை	Colors Tamil	7 March 2022	
October	7	Bharatidasan Colony	பாரதிதாசன் காலனி	Star Vijay	20 June 2022	
October	7	Sippikul Muthu	சிப்பிக்குள் முத்து	Star Vijay	18 April 2022	
October	8	Chandralekha	சந்திரலேகா	Sun TV	6 October 2014	
October	8	Paavam Ganesan	பாவம் கணேசன்	Star Vijay	4 January 2021	
October	9	Sathya 2	சத்யா 2	Zee Tamil	25 October 2021	
November	12	Oru Oorla Rendu Rajakumari	ஒரு ஊருல இரண்டு ராஜகுமாரி	Zee Tamil	25 October 2021	
November	20	Pudhu Pudhu Arthangal	புதுப்புது அர்த்தங்கள்	Zee Tamil	22 March 2021	
November	25	Manthira Punnagai	மந்திர புன்னகை	Colors Tamil	1 August 2022	
December	3	Roja	ரோஜா	Sun TV	9 April 2018	
December	9	Valli Thirumanam	வள்ளி திருமணம்	Colors Tamil	3 January 2022	
December	9	Pachakili	பச்சக்கிளி	Colors Tamil	4 July 2022	
December	30	Kanda Naal Mudhal	கண்ட நாள் முதல்	Colors Tamil	13 June 2022	

=== Shows ===
Ending		Title	Tamil title	Network(s)	First aired	Ref
January	16	Bigg Boss 5	பிக் பாஸ் 5	Star Vijay	3 October 2021	
April	10	Junior Super Star 4	ஜூனியர் சூப்பர் ஸ்டார் 4	Zee Tamil	26 December 2021	
April	17	Start Music 3	ஸ்டார்ட் மியூசிக் 3	Star Vijay	10 October 2021	
June	20	Super Singer Junior 8	சூப்பர் சிங்கர் ஜூனியர் 8	Star Vijay	19 December 2021	
July	24	Pottikku Potti	போட்டிக்கு போட்டி	Colors Tamil	3 April 2022	
July	24	Cooku with Comali 3	குக்கு வித் கோமாளி 33	Star Vijay	22 January 2022	
August	7	Run Baby Run	ரன் பேபி ரன்	Zee Tamil	27 February 2022	
August	14	Kalakka Povathu Yaaru Champions 3	கலக்க போவது யாரு சாம்பியன்ஸ் 3	Star Vijay	20 February 2022	
September	4	BB Jodigal 2	பிபி ஜோடிகள் 2	Star Vijay	8 May 2022	
October	2	Raju Vootla Party	ராஜு வூட்லா பார்ட்டி	Star Vijay	24 July 2022	
October	30	Vellum Thiramai	வெல்லும் திறமை	Colors Tamil	4 June 2022	
November	20	Mr and Mrs Chinnathirai 4	மிஸ்டர் அண்ட் மிசஸ் சின்னத்திரை 4	Star Vijay	2 July 2022	
December	11	Dance Jodi Dance Reloaded	டான்ஸ் ஜோடி டான்ஸ் ரீலோடட்	Zee Tamil	30 July 2022	

== Movie premieres of 2022 ==
=== January ===
Date	Film name	Channel	Notes	Ref
1	Njan Marykutty	Colors Tamil	Dubbed version of Malayalam film	
1	Tuck Jagadish	Zee Tamil	Dubbed version of Telugu film	
2	Friendship	Colors Tamil		
9	Sabhaapathy	Colors Tamil		
9	Thalaivii	Zee Tamil		
14	Aranmanai 3	Kalaignar TV	Pongal Festival premieres	
14	Annaatthe	Sun TV	Pongal Festival premieres	
15	18 local boys	Colors Tamil	Dubbed version of Malayalam film	
15	Jai Bhim	Kalaignar TV	Mattu Pongal Festival premieres	
15	Raajavamsam	Sun TV	Mattu Pongal Festival premieres	
16	Yennanga Sir Unga Sattam	Colors Tamil		
23	Porinju Mariam Jose	Colors Tamil	Dubbed version of Malayalam film	
30	Appathava Aattaya Pottutanga	Colors Tamil		
30	Chithirai Sevvaanam	Zee Tamil		

=== February ===
Date	Film name	Channel	Notes	Ref
6	Anbulla Ghilli	Colors Tamil		
13	Kotigobba 3	Colors Tamil	Dubbed version of Kannada film	
13	Naduvan	Colors Tamil		
13	Sridevi Soda Center	Colors Tamil	Dubbed version of Telugu film	
20	Thalli Pogathey	Colors Tamil		
20	Kombu Vatcha Singamda	Sun TV		
27	Cinderella	Colors Tamil		

=== March ===
Date	Film name	Channel	Notes	Ref
6	Maara	Colors Tamil		
6	Velan	Zee Tamil		
13	Thaen	Colors Tamil		
13	Jail	Kalaignar TV		
20	Badava Rascal	Colors Tamil	Dubbed version of Kannada film	
20	Ulkuthu	Colors Tamil		
27	Kasada Tabara	Colors Tamil		
27	Anandham Vilayadum Veedu	Zee Tamil		
28	Mr. and Mrs. Ramachari	Colors Tamil	Dubbed version of Kannada film	
29	Mufti	Colors Tamil	Dubbed version of Kannada film	
30	Speedunnodu	Colors Tamil	Dubbed version of Telugu film	
31	Athidhi	Colors Tamil	Dubbed version of Telugu film	

=== April ===
Date	Film name	Channel	Notes	Ref
1	Saakshyam	Colors Tamil	Dubbed version of Telugu film	
3	Vanam	Colors Tamil		
3	Marutha	Sun TV		
10	Sila Nerangalil Sila Manidhargal	Colors Tamil		
10	Veeramae Vaagai Soodum	Zee Tamil		
14	Nishabdham	Zee Tamil	Tamil New Year premieres	
14	Kuttram Kuttrame	Kalaignar TV	Tamil New Year premieres	
14	Naai Sekar	Sun TV	Tamil New Year premieres	

=== May ===
Date	Film name	Channel	Notes	Ref
1	Writer	Colors Tamil		
1	Valimai	Zee Tamil		
1	Idiot	Kalaignar TV		
8	Akhanda	Zee Tamil	Dubbed version of Telugu film	
15	Oomai Sennaai	Colors Tamil		
22	Jango	Colors Tamil		
22	The Priest	Zee Tamil	Dubbed version of Malayalam film	
29	Carbon	Colors Tamil		

=== June ===
Date	Film name	Channel	Notes	Ref
12	Clap	Colors Tamil		
12	Kallan	Zee Tamil		
19	Namma Oorukku Ennadhan Achu	Colors Tamil		
26	Miga Miga Avasaram	Colors Tamil		
26	Radhe Shyam	Zee Tamil	Dubbed version of Telugu film	

=== July ===
Date	Film name	Channel	Notes	Ref
3	RK Nagar	Colors Tamil		
10	Inba Twinkle Lilly	Colors Tamil		
17	Maanbumigu Marumagan	Colors Tamil	Dubbed version of Telugu film	
24	Hostel	Colors Tamil		

=== August ===
Date	Film name	Channel	Notes	Ref
7	Pothanur Thabal Nilayam	Colors Tamil		
14	Veetla Vishesham	Zee Tamil		
14	4 Sorry	Kalaignar TV		
14	Etharkkum Thunindhavan	Sun TV		
15	The Kashmir Files	Zee Tamil	Dubbed version of Hindi film	
15	Nenjuku Needhi	Kalaignar TV		
21	Ayngaran	Colors Tamil		
28	Hey Sinamika	Colors Tamil		
28	Republic	Zee Tamil	Dubbed version of Telugu film	
31	Mahaan	Kalaignar TV		

=== September ===
Date	Film name	Channel	Notes	Ref
4	Koogle Kuttappa	Colors Tamil		
4	Panni Kutty	Sun TV		
11	D Block	Colors Tamil		
11	Mappillai Thevai	Sun TV	Dubbed version of Telugu film	
18	Kalpana 2	Colors Tamil	Dubbed version of Kannada film	
25	Ranga	Colors Tamil		
25	Kurup	Zee Tamil	Dubbed version of Malayalam Film	

=== October ===
Date	Film name	Channel	Notes	Ref
2	Dejavu	Colors Tamil		
4	Maamanithan	Zee Tamil		
4	Poikkal Kudhirai	Kalaignar TV		
5	Yaanai	Zee Tamil		
9	Selfie	Colors Tamil		
16	Jothi	Colors Tamil		
16	Super Senior Heroes	Sun TV		
23	Bheemla Nayak	Colors Tamil	Dubbed version of Telugu film	
23	Pattampoochi	Kalaignar TV		
24	Captain	Zee Tamil	Deepavali Festival premieres	
24	Sarkarin Elam	Zee Tamil	Dubbed version of Telugu film	
24	Don	Kalaignar TV		
24	Beast	Sun TV		

=== November ===
Date	Film name	Channel	Notes	Ref
6	Sarvam Thaala Mayam	Colors Tamil		
13	Radha Krishna	Colors Tamil		
20	Singa Magan	Colors Tamil	Dubbed version of Telugu film	
27	Coffee	Colors Tamil		
27	My Dear Bootham	Zee Tamil		

=== December ===
Date	Film name	Channel	Notes	Ref
2	Yutha Satham	Colors Tamil		
4	Karthikeya 2	Zee Tamil	Dubbed version of Telugu film	
11	Kadhalin Magimai	Colors Tamil	Dubbed version of Telugu film	
18	Pistha	Colors Tamil		
25	Buffoon	Colors Tamil		
25	Meendum	Kalaignar TV		
25	Naane Varuvean	Sun TV		

== Deaths ==
Date	Name	Age	Broadcast credibility
18 September	Pauline Jessica	29	Film and television actress
5 October	Lokesh Rajendran	34	Television actor (Marmadesam)

== See also ==
- 2023 in Tamil television
