= 2020 in Tamil television =

The following is a list of events affecting Tamil language television in 2020 from India (Tamil Nadu), Sri Lanka, Singapore, Malaysia and the Tamil diaspora. Events listed include television show debuts and finales; channel launches and closures; stations changing or adding their network affiliations; and information about changes of ownership of channels or stations.

== Events and new channels ==
=== January ===
Date	Channel	Notes	Ref
19	Zee Thirai	Tamil-language pay television channel which broadcasts Tamil movies 24x7. Launched on 19 January 2020 and owned by Zee Entertainment Enterprises.	

=== October ===
Date	Channel	Notes	Ref
4	Star Vijay Music	Tamil music television channel that was launched on 4 October 2020	

== Debut series and shows ==
=== Soap operas ===
Opening		Title	Tamil title	Network(s)	Finale	Status	Ref
January	2	Uyire	உயிரே	Colors Tamil		Ended	
January	6	Romeo and Juliet	ரோமியோ அண்ட் ஜூலியட்	Mediacorp Vasantham	6 March	Ended	
January	27	Amman	அம்மன்	Colors Tamil		Ended	
January	27	Chithi 2	சித்தி 2	Sun TV		Ended	
January	27	Anbudan Kushi	அன்புடன் குஷி	Star Vijay		Ended	
February	3	Bommukutty Ammavukku	பொம்முக்குட்டி அம்மாவுக்கு	Star Vijay	5 December	Ended	
February	9	Adhisaya Piraviyum Arpudha Pennum	அதிசய பிறவியும் அற்புத பெண்ணும்	Star Vijay		Canceled	
February	14	Idhayathai Thirudathe	இதயத்தை திருடாதே	Colors Tamil		Ended	
February	17	Nagini 4	நாகினி 4	Colors Tamil	21 March	Ended	
February	17	Neyo-Vinveli Nanpan	நியோ-விண்வெளி நண்பன்	Mediacorp Vasantham	23 March	Ended	
February	17	Yaar 3?	யார்? 3	Mediacorp Vasantham	20 April	Ended	
February	24	Neethane Enthan Ponvasantham	நீதானே எந்தன் பொன்வசந்தம்	Zee Tamil		Ended	
March	9	Aha Kalyanam	ஆஹா கல்யாணம்	Colors Tamil	28 March	Canceled	
March	9	Aram Sei	அறம் செய்	Mediacorp Vasantham	30 March	Ended	
March	16	Endrendrum Punnagai	என்றென்றும் புன்னகை	Zee Tamil		Ended	
May	28	Shri Krishna	ஸ்ரீ கிருஷ்ணா	Colors Tamil		Canceled	
May	28	Chandrikantha	சந்திரகாந்தா	Colors Tamil		Canceled	
June	2	Good Night Crezy	குட் நைட் கிரேசி	Mediacorp Vasantham	16 September	Ended	
July	27	Kanne Kaniyamuthe	கண்ணே கனியமுதே	Mediacorp Vasantham	5 October	Ended	
July	27	Adhi Parasakthi	ஆதி பராசக்தி	Sun TV		Ended	
July	27	Naga Mohini	நாக மோகினி	Sun TV	31 October	Ended	
July	27	Marmadesam	மர்மதேசம்	Sun TV	November	Ended	
August	10	Poove Unakkaga	பூவே உனக்காக	Sun TV		Ended	
August	25	Kaiyalavu Manasu	கையளவு மனசு	Mediacorp Vasantham	November	Ended	
September	13	Queen	குயின்	Zee Tamil	November	Ended	
September	13	Amaya	அமாயா	Shakthi TV	November	Ended	
September	21	Suryavamsam	சூர்யவம்சம்	Zee Tamil		Ended	
September	26	Puratchiyalar Dr. Ambedkar	புரட்சியாளர் டாக்டர் அம்பேத்கர்	Zee Tamil		Ended	
September	28	Kavasam	கவசம்	Mediacorp Vasantham	23 September	Ended	
October	12	Chinna Poove Mella Pesu	சின்னபூவே மெல்லபேசு	Zee Tamil		Ended	
October	12	Thirumagal	திருமகள்	Sun TV		Ended	
October	12	Raja Rani 2	ராஜா ராணி 2	Star Vijay		Ended	
October	12	Salanam	சலனம்	Mediacorp Vasantham	4 December	Ended	
October	26	Abhiyum Naanum	அபியும் நானும்	Sun TV		Ended	
October	26	Thiravathiran	திரவாதிமன்	Mediacorp Vasantham	4 December	Ended	
October	27	Bhagavan Sree Krishnar	பகவான் ஸ்ரீ கிருஷ்ணர்	Zee Tamil		Canceled	
November	2	Kannana Kanne	கண்ணான கண்ணே	Sun TV		Ended	
November	2	Anbe Vaa	அன்பே வா	Sun TV		Ended	
December	18	Velaikkaran	வேலைக்காரன்	Star Vijay		Ended	
December	18	Vanathai Pola	வானத்தைப்போல	Sun TV		Ended	
December	18	C.I.D Sakunthala	சி.ஐ.டி சகுந்தலா	Mediacorp Vasantham		Ended	
December	18	Unmai Kantheduthe	உண்மை கண் தேடுதே	Mediacorp Vasantham		Ended	
December	18	Naam	நாம்	Mediacorp Vasantham		Ended	
December	28	Thuruvangal	துருவங்கள்	Mediacorp Vasantham		Ended	

=== Shows ===
Opening		Title	Tamil title	Network(s)	Finale	Status	Ref
January	4	Ithu Enna Pattu 5	இது என்ன பாட்டு 5	Mediacorp Vasantham	28 March	Ended	
January	5	Vanakkam Singai	வணக்கம் சிங்கை	Mediacorp Vasantham	12 July	Ended	
January	5	Yaar Andha Star 2020	யார் அந்த ஸ்டார் 2020	Mediacorp Vasantham	29 March	Ended	
January	7	Alaikal Oivathillai	அலைகள் ஓய்வதில்லை	Mediacorp Vasantham	31 March	Ended	
January	11	Vadi Ready Vedu	வடி ரெடி வெடி	Mediacorp Vasantham	28 March	Ended	
January	14	Jaya Star Singer 3	ஜெயா ஸ்டார் சிங்கர் 3	Jaya TV		Ended	
January	23	Oru Manithani Kathai	ஒரு மனிதனின் கதை	Mediacorp Vasantham	5 March	Ended	
January	25	Shakthi Super Star 2020	சக்தி சூப்பர் ஸ்டார்ஸ் 2020	Shakthi TV	29 November	Ended	
January	28	Ulle Veliye	உள்ளே வெளியே	Jaya TV		Ended	
February	9	Kallakapovathu Yaaru? 9	கலக்கப் போவது யாரு? 9	Star Vijay	27 December	Ended	
February	9	sabash Tamil Nadu	சபாஷ் தமிழ்நாடு	DD Podhigai		Ended	
February	17	Nerkonda Parvai	நேர்கொண்ட பார்வை	Kalaignar TV		Ended	
February	22	Super Singer Junior 7	சூப்பர் சிங்கர் ஜூனியர் 7	Star Vijay		Canceled	
March	8	Mr and Mrs Chinnathirai 2	மிஸ்டர் அண்ட் மிசஸ் சின்னத்திரை 2	Star Vijay	11 October	Ended	
March	9	Rusikkalam Vanga	ருசிக்கலாம் வாங்க	Puthuyugam TV		Ended	
March	12	Ennulle	என்னுள்ளே 2	Mediacorp Vasantham		Ended	
March	12	Thaduppuci	தடுப்பூசி	Mediacorp Vasantham		Ended	
July	20	Super Samayal 5	சூப்பர் சமையல் 5	Mediacorp Vasantham	18 September	Ended	
August	16	Start Music 2	ஸ்டார்ட் மியூசிக் 2	Star Vijay		Ended	
August	16	Super Singer - Champion of Champions	சூப்பர் சிங்கர் சாம்பியன் ஆப் சாம்பியன்	Star Vijay	1 November	Ended	
October	4	Bigg Boss 4	பிக் பாஸ் தமிழ் 4	Star Vijay		Ended	
November	7	Suvai 6	சுவை 6	Mediacorp Vasantham		Ended	
November	7	Colors Samayal	கலர்ஸ் சமையல்	Colors Tamil		Ended	
November	14	Cooku with Comali 2	குக்கு வித் கோமாளி 2	Star Vijay		Ended	

== Debut web series ==
Opening		Title	Tamil title	Director	Platform	Ref
February	1	Topless	டாப்லெஸ்	Dinesh Mohan	ZEE5	
March	13	Kannamoochi	கண்ணாமூச்சி	Avinaash Hariharan	ZEE5	
September	18	Time Enna Boss!?	டைம் என்னா பாஸ்!?	Subu	Amazon Prime Video	
October	26	Vallamai Tharayo	வல்லமை தாராயோ	Thiruselvam	Vikatan TV (YouTube)	
October	30	Thanthu Vitten Ennai	தந்து விட்டேன் என்னை	Rajeev K. Prasad	ZEE5	
October	30	Mugilan	முகிலன்	Sri Ram Ram	ZEE5	
November	28	PubGoa	பப்கோவா	Lakshmi Narayana	ZEE5	
December	11	Triples	டிரிபிள்ஸ்	Charukesh Sekar	Disney+ Hotstar	
December	18	Paava Kadhaigal	பாவக் கதைகள்	Sudha Kongara, Vignesh Shivan, Gautham Menon, Vetrimaaran	Netflix	
December	22	Singa Penne	சிங்க பெண்ணே	R. Pavan	ZEE5	

== Ending series and shows ==
Ending		Title	Network(s)	First aired	New show	Ref
January	2	Thillana தில்லானா	Mediacorp Vasantham	4 November 2019	Romeo and Juliet ரோமியோ அண்ட் ஜூலியட்	
January	4	Vasantham Cafe வசந்தம் கஃபே	Mediacorp Vasantham	9 December 2019	Ithu Enna Pattu 5 இது என்ன பாட்டு 5	
January	25	Kallappotti கல்லாப்பெட்டி	Colors Tamil	30 September 2019	-	
January	25	Lakshmi Stores லட்சுமி ஸ்டோர்ஸ்	Sun TV	24 December 2018	Chithi 2 சித்தி 2	
January	29	Mundru Mudisu மூன்று முடிச்சு	Polimer TV	30 January 2012	-	
January	1	Ponmagal Vanthal பொன்மகள் வந்தாள்	Star Vijay	26 February 2018	Bommukutty Ammavukku பொம்முக்குட்டி அம்மாவுக்கு	
January	2	Kalakka Povadhu Yaaru Champions கலக்கப்போவது யாரு சாம்பியன்ஸ் 2	Star Vijay	11 August 2019	Kalakka Povathu Yaaru 9 கலக்கப்போவது யாரு? 9	
January	13	Arivaan அறிவான்	Mediacorp Vasantham	11 November 2019	Yaar? 3 யார்? 3	
January	14	Nagini 1 நாகினி 1	Colors Tamil	18 November 2019	Idhayathai Thirudathe இதயத்தை திருடாதே	
January	14	Kodeeswari கோடீஸ்வரி	Colors Tamil	23 December 2019	Thirumanam திருமணம்	
January	22	Devathaiyai Kanden தேவதையை கண்டேன்	Zee Tamil	9 October 2017	Sembaruthi செம்பருத்தி (Re-Telecast)	
January	22	Niram Maaratha Pookkal நிறம் மாறாத பூக்கள்	Zee Tamil	9 October 2017	Kandukondain Kandukondain கண்டு கொண்டேன் கண்டு கொண்டேன்	
January	23	Cooku with Comali 1 குக்கு வித் கோமாளி 1	Star Vijay	16 November 2019	Super Singer 7 சூப்பர் சிங்கர் 7	
March	1	Dancing Super Star டான்சிங் சூப்பர் ஸ்டார்	Star Vijay	17 October 2019	-	
March	2	Thinna Thinna Asai தின்ன தின்ன ஆசை	Mediacorp Vasantham	9 December 2019	Aram Sei	
March	7	The Wall தி வோல்	Star Vijay	12 October 2019	Mr and Mrs Chinnathirai 2 திரு & திருமதி சின்னத்திரை 2	
March	8	Super Mom 2 சூப்பர் மாம் 2	Zee Tamil	10 November 2019	-	
March	14	Siva Manasula Sakthi சிவா மனசுல சக்தி	Star Vijay	21 January 2019	Ayutha Ezhuthu ஆயுத எழுத்து	
March	25	Ethiroli 16 எதிரொலி 16	Mediacorp Vasantham	3 April 2019	-	
March	27	Kalyana Parisu கல்யாணப்பரிசு	Sun TV	10 February 2014	-	
March	31	Run ரன்	Sun TV	5 August 2019	-	
August	1	Piriyadha Varam Vendum பிரியாத வரம் வேண்டும்	Zee Tamil	17 June 2019	-	
August	14	Nachiyarpuram நாச்சியார்புரம்	Zee Tamil	8 July 2019	Poove Poochudava பூவே பூச்சூடவா	
September	3	Oviya ஓவியா	Colors Tamil	26 November 2018	Amman அம்மன்	
September	19	Mouna Raagam மௌன ராகம்	Zee Tamil	24 April 2017	Pandian Stores பாண்டியன் ஸ்டோர்ஸ்	
October	31	Nahamogini நாக மோகினி	Sun TV	27 August 2020	-	
October	31	Nayagi 2 நாயகி 2	Sun TV	1 March 2020	Anbe Vaa அன்பே வா	
November	28	Kanmani கண்மணி	Sun TV	22 October 2018	Thirumagal திருமகள்	

== Cancelled shows ==
Ending		Title	Tamil title	Network(s)	First aired	Ref
March	25	Chocolate	சாக்லேட்	Sun TV	16 December 2019	
March	27	Naam Iruvar Namakku Iruvar	நாம் இருவர் நமக்கு இருவர்	Star Vijay	26 March 2018	
March	27	Aranmanai Kili	அரண்மனை கிளி	Star Vijay	24 September 2018	
March	31	Minnale	மின்னலே	Sun TV	6 August 2018	
March	31	Tamil Selvi	தமிழ் செல்வி	Sun TV	6 August 2018	
March	31	Azhagu	அழகு	Sun TV	20 November 2017	
March	31	Nayagi 1	நாயகி 1	Sun TV	19 February 2018	
April	3	Rasaathi	ராசாத்தி	Sun TV	23 September 2019	

== Deaths ==
Date	Name	Age	Broadcast credibility
9 December	V. J. Chitra	28	Television actress (Chinna Papa Periya Papa Season 1 & 2, Saravanan Meenatchi Season 3, Pandian Stores)
