= Pottikku Potti =

Indian reality television show

- Original title: போட்டிக்கு போட்டி நீங்கள் தயாரா?
- Genre: Reality; Game show
- Presented by: Bhavana Balakrishnan
- Judges: Baba Bhaskar; Sridhar; Kala
- Country of origin: India
- Original language: Tamil
- No. of seasons: 1
- No. of episodes: 33

Production
- Production location: Tamil Nadu
- Camera setup: Multi-camera
- Running time: approx.42-45 minutes per episode

Original release
- Network: Colors Tamil
- Release: 3 April – 24 July 2022

Pottikku Potti.. R U Ready ??? (போட்டிக்கு போட்டி நீங்கள் தயாரா?) was an Indian-Tamil-language reality television show, which premiered on 3 April 2022 and was broadcast on Colors Tamil. Baba Bhaskar, Sridhar and Kala were the judges, and Bhavana Balakrishnan was the host.

The show aired from 3 April 2022, on Sunday at 19:00, and from 9 April, aired every Saturday and Sunday aired at 20:00 and ended with 33 episodes on 24 July 2022 and available for streaming in selected markets on Voot. The First Season was won by the Valli Thirumanam Series Team.

== Overview ==
Season	Episodes	Original Broadcast		Winner
Season	Episodes	First Aired	Last Aired	Winner
1	33	3 April 2022	24 July 2022	Valli Thirumanam

== Judges and hosts ==
=== Judges ===
season	Judges	Notes	Episodes
1	Baba Bhaskar	Indian dance choreographer, director, and actor who works mainly in Tamil and Telugu language films in addition to some Hindi, Malayalam, Kannada films.	1-25
1	Kala	Indian choreographer. She is the director of the Indian reality dance talent show, Maanada Mayilada – where she is one of the three judges.	12–33
1	Sridhar	Indian choreographer who has worked in across India's several regional film industries.	26–33

=== Host ===
season	Judges	Notes	Episodes
1	Bhavana Balakrishnan	Indian television anchor, cricket commentator, video jockey, playback singer and dancer.	1-33

== Episodes ==
Episodes	Airing	Team		Round
1	3 April 2022	The Grand Launch		
2	9 April 2022	Sillunu Oru Kaadhal	Idhayathai Thirudathe	
3	10 April 2022	Meera	Idhu Solla Marandha Kadhai	
4	16 April 2022	Amman 3	Namma Madurai Sisters	
5	17 April 2022	Abhi Tailor	Valli Thirumanam	
6	23 April 2022	Sillunu Oru Kaadhal	Abhi Tailor	
7	24 April 2022	Idhu Solla Marandha Kadhai	Amman 3	
8	30 April 2022	Idhayathai Thirudathe	Valli Thirumanam	
9	1 May 2022	Idhu Solla Marandha Kadhai	Namma Madurai Sisters	
10	7 May 2022	Sillunu Oru Kaadhal	Valli Thirumanam	
11	17 April 2022	Meera	Namma Madurai Sisters	
12	14 May 2022	Idhayathai Thirudathe	Abhi Tailor	
13	14 May 2022	Meera	Amman 3	
14	21 May 2022	Valli Thirumanam	Idhu Solla Marandha Kadhai	
15	22 May 2022	Sillunu Oru Kaadhal	Valli Thirumanam	super six round with a Party celebration theme
16	28 May 2022	Meera	Idhu Solla Marandha Kadhai	A tour around the city of Chennai
17	29 May 2022	Sillunu Oru Kaadhal	Valli Thirumanam	Political round
18	4 June 2022	Meera	Sillunu Oru Kaadhal	The haunted episode
19	5 June 2022	Idhu Solla Marandha Kadhai	Namma Madurai Sisters	Meeting of Dons
20	11 June 2022	Sillunu Oru Kaadhal	Namma Madurai Sisters	exciting theme of Cinema.
21	12 June 2022	Sillunu Oru Kaadhal	Idhu Solla Marandha Kadhai	Into the woods
22	18 June 2022	Abhi Tailor	Idhu Solla Marandha Kadhai	Back to school
23	19 June 2022	Abhi Tailor	Namma Madurai Sisters	Dad is my superhero
24	25 June 2022	Abhi Tailor	Meera	I love sports!
25	26 June 2022	Valli Thirumanam	Abhi Tailor	Po Po mall is Hi-jacked!
26	2 July 2022	Namma Madurai Sisters	Meera	The haunted episode
27	3 July 2022	Namma Madurai Sisters	Valli Thirumanam	Let's go to the beach
28	9 July 2022	Valli Thirumanam	Meera	Race to the semi-finals
29	10 July 2022	Valli Thirumanam	Abhi Tailor	The semi-finals
30	16 July 2022	Namma Madurai Sisters	Idhu Solla Marandha Kadhai	
31	17 July 2022	Valli Thirumanam	Namma Madurai Sisters	
32	23 July 2022	Valli Thirumanam	Abhi Tailor	Grand Finale
33	24 July 2022	Valli Thirumanam	Abhi Tailor	Winner: Valli Thirumanam
