= Khushbu Sundar filmography =

Khushbu Sundar, an Indian actress, has predominantly worked in Tamil language films, alongside Telugu, Kannada, Hindi and Malayalam language films. She has appeared in more than 200 films, with over 100 directly credited to Tamil cinema alone.

== Films ==
Key
| † | Denotes films that have not yet been released |

=== Tamil films ===
| Year | Title | Role(s) | Notes | Ref. |
|---|---|---|---|---|
| 1988 | Dharmathin Thalaivan | Devi | | |
| 1989 | Varusham 16 | Radhika | | |
| 1989 | Vetri Vizha | Jaya | | |
| 1990 | Paattukku Naan Adimai | Julie | | |
| 1990 | Kizhakku Vasal | Selvi | | |
| 1990 | Naanum Indha Ooruthan | Sevvanthi | | |
| 1990 | Aarathi Edungadi | Meera | | |
| 1990 | My Dear Marthandan | Rani | | |
| 1990 | Thalattu Padava | Narmadha | | |
| 1990 | Engitta Mothathay | Saroja | | |
| 1990 | Michael Madana Kama Rajan | Shalini Shivaraman | | |
| 1990 | Nadigan | Geetha | | |
| 1991 | Chinna Thambi | Nandhini | | |
| 1991 | Vigneshwar | Ramya Rajendran | | |
| 1991 | Iravu Sooriyan | Khushbu | | |
| 1991 | Kizhakku Karai | Mahalakshmi | | |
| 1991 | Nattukku Oru Nallavan | Rekha | Multilingual | |
| 1991 | Bramma | Jennifer | | |
| 1992 | Mannan | Meena | | |
| 1992 | Rickshaw Mama | Gauri | | |
| 1992 | Pandithurai | Muthulakshmi | | |
| 1992 | Singaravelan | Sumathi | | |
| 1992 | Sevagan | Anjali | | |
| 1992 | Idhu Namma Bhoomi | Nandhini | | |
| 1992 | Annaamalai | Subu | | |
| 1992 | Amma Vanthachu | Nandini | | |
| 1992 | Naalaya Seidhi | Anu | | |
| 1992 | Pandiyan | Rekha | | |
| 1993 | Maravan | Thangathai | | |
| 1993 | Purusha Lakshanam | Abhirami (Ammu) | | |
| 1993 | Uthama Raasa | Meenakshi / Meena | | |
| 1993 | Dharma Seelan | Durga | | |
| 1993 | Kathirukka Neramillai | Bhavani | | |
| 1993 | Pratap | Anjali | | |
| 1993 | Rojavai Killathe | Anu | | |
| 1993 | Vedan | Usha | | |
| 1993 | Captain Magal | Kavitha | | |
| 1993 | Jathi Malli | Sriranjini | | |
| 1993 | Nam Nattu Rajakkal | Priya | | |
| 1994 | Indhu | Herself | Special appearance in song "Metro Channel" | |
| 1994 | Vaa Magale Vaa | Uma | | |
| 1994 | Manasu Rendum Pudhusu | Lakshmi | | |
| 1994 | Nattamai | Lakshmi | | |
| 1994 | Vanaja Girija | Vanaja | | |
| 1995 | Chinna Vathiyar | Janaki | | |
| 1995 | Karuppu Nila | Nandhini | | |
| 1995 | Murai Maman | Indhu | | |
| 1995 | En Pondatti Nallava | Radhika | | |
| 1995 | Kolangal | Ganga | | |
| 1995 | Muthu Kulikka Vaarieyala | Sivagami | | |
| 1995 | Thedi Vandha Raasa | Devi | | |
| 1995 | Paattu Padava | Herself | Cameo | |
| 1995 | Varraar Sandiyar | Meena | | |
| 1996 | Nattupura Pattu | Parijatham | | |
| 1996 | Irattai Roja | Priya | | |
| 1996 | Enakkoru Magan Pirappan | Swathi | | |
| 1996 | Gopala Gopala | Usha | | |
| 1997 | Ettupatti Rasa | Pandiyamma | | |
| 1997 | Thaali Pudhusu | Seetha | | |
| 1997 | Kalyana Vaibhogam | Ramya | | |
| 1997 | Paththini | — | | |
| 1997 | Vasuke | Fake bride | Cameo | |
| 1998 | Color Kanavugal | Pooja | | |
| 1998 | Thulli Thirintha Kaalam | Kausalya | | |
| 1998 | Ponnu Velayira Bhoomi | Pushpa | | |
| 1998 | Veera Thalattu | Village Girl | | |
| 1998 | Jolly | Nandhini | | |
| 1998 | Kalyana Galatta | Jennifer | | |
| 1998 | Unnidathil Ennai Koduthen | Herself | Special appearance in song "Vaanambadiyen" | |
| 1998 | Simmarasi | Sivagami | | |
| 1998 | Veeram Vilanja Mannu | Seven Amma | | |
| 1998 | Guru Paarvai | Shanthi | | |
| 1998 | Kannathal | Villu Paatukari | Guest appearance | |
| 1999 | Ponnu Veetukkaran | Mrs. Jeeva | Cameo | |
| 1999 | Unnai Thedi | Herself | Special appearance in song "Katraga Waruwaya" | |
| 1999 | Ullathai Killathe | Athmani | | |
| 1999 | Suyamvaram | Mrs. Arunachalam | | |
| 1999 | Viralukketha Veekkam | Suguna | | |
| 1999 | Malabar Police | Ammukutty | | |
| 1999 | Minsara Kanna | Indira Devi | | |
| 1999 | Manaivikku Mariyadhai | Priya | | |
| 1999 | Kudumba Sangili | Rasathi | | |
| 2000 | Alai Payuthey | Meena | Cameo | |
| 2000 | Koodi Vazhnthal Kodi Nanmai | Meenakshi | | |
| 2000 | Magalirkkaga | Bhavani | | |
| 2000 | Puratchikkaaran | Kalyani | | |
| 2000 | Unnai Kann Theduthey | Charulatha | | |
| 2000 | Chinna Chinna Kannile | Rathi | | |
| 2000 | Krodham 2 | Latha | | |
| 2000 | Karisakattu Poove | Aandal | | |
| 2000 | Simmasanam | Mrs. Sakthivel | | |
| 2000 | Veeranadai | Mallika | | |
| 2001 | Kaatrukkenna Veli | Lakshmi | | |
| 2001 | Vinnukkum Mannukkum | Lakshmi | | |
| 2002 | Sri Bannari Amman | Dancer | Special appearance in song "Kutram Enna" | |
| 2005 | June R | Amudha | | |
| 2005 | Vetrivel Sakthivel | Kamatchi | | |
| 2005 | Power of Women | Jyothi | | |
| 2006 | Thalai Nagaram | —N/a | As costume designer | |
| 2006 | Thalaimagan | Dancer | Special appearance in the song "Nooru Nooru" | |
| 2007 | Vegam | Selvi | | |
| 2007 | Periyar | Maniammai | | |
| 2008 | Pazhani | Karpagambal | | |
| 2008 | Kuselan | Herself | Special appearance in song "Cinema Cinema" | |
| 2009 | Villu | Herself | Special appearance in song "Rama Rama" | |
| 2009 | Satrumun Kidaitha Thagaval | Dr Radha | | |
| 2010 | Vaadaa | Herself | Special appearance | |
| 2011 | Ponnar Shankar | Thamarai Nachiyar | | |
| 2011 | Ilaignan | Valiyammayi | | |
| 2013 | Theeya Velai Seiyyanum Kumaru | Herself | Special appearance in song "Thiruttu Pasanga" | |
| 2015 | Aambala | Herself | Special appearance in song "Aye Aye Aye" | |
| 2016 | Aranmanai 2 | Herself | Special appearance in song "Amman" | |
| 2018 | Traffic Ramasamy | Herself | Special appearance | |
| 2021 | Annaatthe | Angaiyaarkanni | | |
| 2022 | Mudhal Nee Mudivum Nee | Herself | Special appearance | |
| 2023 | Varisu | | Special appearance (Portions Deleted) | |
| 2024 | Aranmanai 4 | Herself | Special appearance in the song "Amman"; also co-producer | |
| 2025 | Nesippaya | Vasundhra Adhinarayanan | | |
| 2026 | Double Occupancy | Doctor | | |
| 2026 | Mookuthi Amman 2 | Goddess of Melnaadu | Cameo Appearance | |

=== Other language films ===
| Year | Title | Role(s) | Language | Notes | Ref. |
|---|---|---|---|---|---|
| 1980 | The Burning Train | School student | Hindi | Child artist | |
| 1980 | Thodisi Bewafaii | Nandu | Hindi | Child artist | |
| 1980 | Pyaara Dushman | — | Hindi | Child artist | |
| 1981 | Naseeb | Young Julie | Hindi | Child artist | |
| 1981 | Laawaris | Young Mohini | Hindi | Child artist | |
| 1981 | Aapas Ki Baat | Roshni | Hindi | Child artist | |
| 1981 | Kaalia | Rina | Hindi | Child artist | |
| 1981 | Poonam | Young Poonam | Hindi | Child artist | |
| 1982 | Dard Ka Rishta | Khushbu | Hindi | Child artist | |
| 1982 | Bemisal | Meena | Hindi | Child artist | |
| 1982 | Raaste Pyar Ke | Anu | Hindi | Child artist | |
| 1985 | Jaanoo | Bittu | Hindi | Debut as heroine | |
| 1985 | Meri Jung | Komal Varma | Hindi | | |
| 1985 | Ghar Mein Ram Gali Mein Shyam | Munni | Hindi | | |
| 1986 | Patton Ki Bazi | Preet Oberoi | Hindi | | |
| 1986 | Tan-Badan | Gauri | Hindi | | |
| 1986 | Kaliyuga Pandavulu | Bharathi | Telugu | | |
| 1986 | Captain Nagarjun | Radha | Telugu | | |
| 1987 | Trimurtulu | Julie | Telugu | | |
| 1987 | Bharatamlo Arjunudu | Sensational Subhadra | Telugu | | |
| 1987 | Kirai Dada | Rekha | Telugu | | |
| 1987 | Marana Homam | Kamala | Telugu | | |
| 1988 | Chinnodu Peddodu | Kavitha | Telugu | | |
| 1988 | Ugranethrudu | Mandakini | Telugu | | |
| 1988 | Aatma Katha | — | Telugu | | |
| 1988 | Prema Kireetam | Swathi | Telugu | | |
| 1988 | Jeevana Jyothi | Noorjahan | Telugu | | |
| 1988 | Veguchukka Pagatichukka | Kaani | Telugu | | |
| 1988 | Chinni Krishnudu | — | Telugu | | |
| 1988 | Ranadheera | Radha | Kannada | | |
| 1988 | Anjada Gandu | Asha | Kannada | | |
| 1989 | Yuga Purusha | Chithra | Kannada | | |
| 1989 | Premagni | | Kannada | | |
| 1989 | Hrudaya Geethe | Asha | Kannada | | |
| 1989 | Rudra | Asha | Kannada | | |
| 1989 | Thaligagi | | Kannada | | |
| 1989 | Gagana | Asha | Kannada | | |
| 1989 | Kaliyuga Bheema | | Kannada | | |
| 1989 | Onti Salaga | Leela | Kannada | | |
| 1990 | Deewana Mujh Sa Nahin | Sonu | Hindi | | |
| 1990 | Guru Sishyulu | Chithra | Telugu | | |
| 1990 | Alajadi | Priya | Telugu | | |
| 1990 | Jayasimha | Seetha | Telugu | | |
| 1990 | Pundara Ganda | — | Kannada | | |
| 1991 | Shanti Kranti | Rekha | Kannada | Multi lingual | |
| 1991 | Shanti Kranti | Rekha | Telugu | Multi lingual | |
| 1991 | Shanti Kranti | Rekha | Hindi | Multi lingual | |
| 1991 | Uncle Bun | Geetha Krishnan | Malayalam | | |
| 1992 | Prem Daan | Seema | Hindi | | |
| 1993 | Abhijith | — | Kannada | | |
| 1993 | Pekata Papa Rao | Uma | Telugu | | |
| 1993 | Prema Samaram | — | Telugu | | |
| 1993 | Yaadavam | Anjana | Malayalam | | |
| 1994 | Manathe Kottaram | Herself | Malayalam | | |
| 1995 | Vrudhanmare Sookshikkuka | Hema | Malayalam | | |
| 1996 | Palegara | — | Kannada | | |
| 1996 | Jeevanadhi | Kaveri | Kannada | | |
| 1997 | Anubhoothi | Uthara | Malayalam | | |
| 1998 | Elavamkodu Desam | Ammalu | Malayalam | | |
| 1999 | Prem Poojari | Herself | Malayalam | Special appearance in song "Kaathil Velli Chittu" | |
| 1999 | Stalin Sivadas | Dr Manjula | Malayalam | | |
| 1999 | Independence | Sridevi IPS | Malayalam | | |
| 1999 | Maha Edabidangi | — | Kannada | | |
| 2000 | Chamundi | Tejaswini | Kannada | | |
| 2001 | Aunty Preethse | — | Kannada | | |
| 2005 | Magic Ajji | Queen Rajeshwari Devi, Ajji | Kannada | | |
| 2005 | Chandrolsavam | Dr Durga | Malayalam | | |
| 2006 | Stalin | Jhansi | Telugu | | |
| 2006 | Kaiyoppu | Padma | Malayalam | | |
| 2007 | Yamadonga | Yama's Wife | Telugu | | |
| 2008 | Magic Lamp | Muslim Man's wife | Malayalam | Cameo | |
| 2010 | Janani | — | Kannada | Cameo | |
| 2010 | Pranchiyettan & the Saint | Dr Omana | Malayalam | | |
| 2011 | Naanalla | Subhash Chandra Prasad's wife | Kannada | | |
| 2012 | Mr. Marumakan | Raja Mallika | Malayalam | | |
| 2013 | Cowboy | Revathy Menon | Malayalam | | |
| 2018 | Agnyaathavaasi | Indrani Bhargav | Telugu | | |
| 2022 | Aadavallu Meeku Johaarlu | Vakula | Telugu | | |
| 2023 | Ramabanam | Bhuvaneswari | Telugu | | |
| 2024 | Vanvaas | Vimla Tyagi | Hindi | | |
| 2026 | Subedaar | Sudha Devi | Hindi | | |
| 2026 | Birbal Triology: Case 2 † | TBA | Kannada | Completed | |

=== As producer ===
| Year | Title | Director | Language | Notes | Ref. |
|---|---|---|---|---|---|
| 2025 | Gangers | Sundar C. | Tamil | | |

== Television ==
She is known for the TV game show Jackpot and the serials Kalki, Janani, Kungumam, Nandini and Lakshmi Stores. Khushbu has also appeared as a judge on the reality shows Maanada Mayilada, Azhagiya Thamizh Maghan and Junior Super Stars.

=== Serials ===
| Year | Title | Role | Channel | Language | Notes | Ref. |
|---|---|---|---|---|---|---|
| 1995 | Chinna Chinna Aasai - Uravu | — | Sun TV | Tamil | Also director | |
| 1997 | Arthamulla Uravugal | — | DD Podhigai | Tamil | | |
| 2001–2002 | Marumagal | — | Star Vijay | Tamil | | |
| 2002–2003 | Janani | Janani | Sun TV | Tamil | | |
| 2003–2004 | Kungumam | Charu | Sun TV | Tamil | | |
| 2004–2007 | Kalki | Kalki | Jaya TV | Tamil | | |
| 2008–2009 | Namma Kudumbam | Radha / Aseema | Kalaignar TV | Tamil | | |
| 2009–2010 | Rudra | Rudra | Zee Tamil | Tamil | | |
| 2012–2014 | Paartha Gnabagam Illayo | Oviya | Kalaignar TV | Tamil | | |
| 2015 | Pasamalar | herself | Sun TV | Tamil | Cameo Appearance | |
| 2017–2018 | Nandini | Parvathi | Sun TV | Tamil | Extended Cameo Appearance | |
| 2017–2019 | Nandini | Parvathi | Udaya TV | Kannada | Extended Cameo Appearance | |
| 2018–2020 | Lakshmi Stores | Mahalakshmi | Sun TV | Tamil | | |
| 2019 | Lakshmi Stores | Mahalakshmi | Gemini TV | Telugu | | |
| 2019 | Roja | Mahalakshmi | Sun TV | Tamil | Mahasangamam with Lakshmi Stores | |
| 2021 | Jothi | Sivagami | Sun TV | Tamil | Cameo Appearance | |
| 2021 | Gokulathil Seethai | Dr Mangalam | Zee Tamil | Tamil | Cameo Appearance | |
| 2022 | Meera | Dr Meera | Colors Tamil | Tamil | Also writer | |
| 2025–present | Sarojini | Sarojini | DD Tamil | Tamil | | |

=== Shows ===
| Year | Title | Role | Channel | Language | Notes | Ref. |
|---|---|---|---|---|---|---|
| 2001–2002 | Kodeeshwari | Host | Jaya TV | Tamil | | |
| 2002–2010, 2026–Present | Jackpot | Host | Jaya TV | Tamil | | |
| 2007–2010 | Maanada Mayilada season 2-5 | Judge | Kalaignar TV | Tamil | | |
| 2010 | Poova Thalaiya | Host | Kalaignar TV | Tamil | | |
| 2010 | Jodi Number One season 5 | Judge | Star Vijay | Tamil | | |
| 2010 | Azhagiya Tamil Magan | Judge | Star Vijay | Tamil | | |
| 2010 | Vaali 1000 | Guest | Vasanth TV | Tamil | | |
| 2012–2013 | Maanada Mayilada season 7-8 | Judge | Kalaignar TV | Tamil | | |
| 2013 | Get Ready | Host | ETV | Telugu | | |
| 2013 | Acham Thavir | Host | Thanthi TV | Tamil | | |
| 2014 | Namma Veetu Mahalakshmi | Host | Zee Tamil | Tamil | | |
| 2014 | Ninaithale Inikkum | Host | Vendhar TV | Tamil | | |
| 2015 | Uggram Ujjwalam | Judge | Mazhavil Manorama | Malayalam | | |
| 2015–2016 | Simply Kushboo | Host | Zee Tamil | Tamil | | |
| 2016 | Junior Super Star | Judge | Zee Tamil | Tamil | | |
| 2016–2017 | Nijangal | Host | Sun TV | Tamil | | |
| 2018 | Sun Naam Oruvar | Guest | Sun TV | Tamil | | |
| 2019 | Vanakkam Tamizha | Guest | Sun TV | Tamil | | |
| 2019 | Alitho Saradaga | Guest | ETV | Telugu | | |
| 2019–2020 | Comedy Stars season 2 | Judge | Asianet | Malayalam | | |
| 2020 | Vanakkam Tamizha | Guest | Sun TV | Tamil | | |
| 2020 | Madras Maamis | Guest | Radaan Mediaworks | Tamil | | |
| 2021–2022 | Dance vs Dance season 2 | Judge | Colors Tamil | Tamil | | |
| 2022 | Pottikku Potti | Participant | Colors Tamil | Tamil | Team Meera | |
| 2022 | Drama Juniors season 4 | Guest | Zee Kannada | Kannada | | |
| 2022–2026 | Extra Jabardasth | Judge | ETV | Telugu | | |
| 2022–2023 | Super Mom season 3 | Judge | Zee Tamil | Tamil | | |
| 2024 | Super Singer 10 | Guest | Star Vijay | Tamil | | |
