= Deepa Shankar =

Indian actress

- Born: Deepa; 10 June 1978 (age 48); Thoothukudi, Tamil Nadu, India
- Other name: Deepa Akka
- Education: Kumaraguru College of Arts and Science
- Occupations: Actress; Television personality; YouTuber; Dance teacher
- Years active: 2002-present
- Spouse: Shankar
- Children: 2

Deepa Shankar is an Indian actress who works in the Tamil film and television industries.

== Early life and career ==
She moved on from Thoothukudi to Coimbatore for her higher education at Kumaraguru College of Arts and Science. She auditioned for Metti Oli in which she was selected for a supporting role, which was her first on-screen role. After working in television, she was noticed for her role in Doctor (2021) for which one critic wrote that she had "imppecable comic timing". Another critic opined that "Then, there is Deepa Shankar, who gets some of the film’s funniest lines, and is great with physical comedy".

On the TV front, Deepa made a mark with her appearance on the reality show Cooku with Comali season 2. She also participated in another reality show Mr and Mrs Chinnathirai along with her husband Shankar. She is playing a guest role in the popular romantic TV show Abhi Tailor.

== Filmography ==
=== Films ===
| Year | Title | Role | Notes |
|---|---|---|---|
| 2009 | Mayandi Kudumbathar | Mayakka Sonakkarupu | |
| 2009 | Vedigundu Murugesan | Ponni | |
| 2016 | Kidaari | Ponnamma | |
| 2018 | Semma | Muthupechi | |
| 2018 | Kadaikutty Singam | Velunachiar Rani | |
| 2019 | Magamuni | Gomathy | |
| 2019 | Sillu Karuppatti | Cashier | |
| 2019 | Sangathamizhan | Murugan's sister | |
| 2020 | Pon Manickavel | Victim's mother | |
| 2021 | Aelay | Village school teacher | |
| 2021 | Mandela | Rathnam's wife | |
| 2021 | Paramapadham Vilayattu | Chezhiyan's supporter | |
| 2021 | Devadas Brothers | Jegathesh's mother | |
| 2021 | Rudhra Thandavam | Maaran's mother | |
| 2021 | Doctor | Preethi | Won, SIIMA Award for Best Comedian |
| 2021 | Udanpirappe | Vairavan's sister-in-law | |
| 2021 | Jango | Servant | |
| 2022 | Veetla Vishesham | Deepa | |
| 2022 | Ward 126 | Neighbour | |
| 2022 | The Legend | Volunteer's wife | |
| 2022 | DSP | Pandiyamma | |
| 2023 | Soppana Sundari | Selvi Amma | |
| 2023 | Rudhran | Karpagam | |
| 2023 | Deiva Machan | Manjula | |
| 2023 | Kathar Basha Endra Muthuramalingam | | |
| 2023 | Raavana Kottam | Deepa | |
| 2023 | Thandatti | Thangaponnu's daughter | |
| 2023 | DD Returns | Mallika | |
| 2023 | Let's Get Married | Selvi | |
| 2023 | License | | |
| 2023 | Va Varalam Va | | |
| 2024 | Aalakaalam | Amudha | |
| 2024 | Pon Ondru Kanden | Karpagam | |
| 2024 | Ninnu Vilayadu | Velu's mother | |
| 2024 | Oru Nodi | Ponnuthayi | |
| 2024 | Saamaniyan | Lakshmi | |
| 2024 | Haraa | Judge | |
| 2024 | Indian 2 | Thambesh's sister | |
| 2024 | Veerayi Makkal | Vadivu | |
| 2024 | Pogumidam Vegu Thooramillai | Avudaiyammal | |
| 2024 | Rajakili | Deivanai | |
| 2025 | Kalan | | |
| 2025 | Madraskaaran | Sathya's aunt | |
| 2025 | Kaadhal Enbadhu Podhu Udamai | Mary | |
| 2025 | Dragon | Maid | |
| 2025 | Perusu | Sundari | |
| 2025 | Robber | Sathya's mother | |
| 2025 | Pei Kottu | Deepa | |
| 2025 | Test | Karpagam | |
| 2025 | Vallamai | | |
| 2025 | Peranbum Perungobamum | | |
| 2025 | Aakkiramippu | | |
| 2025 | Thalaivan Thalaivii | Pottu | |
| 2025 | Vaanaran | | |
| 2025 | Aan Paavam Pollathathu | Maid | |
| 2025 | Madharas Mafia Company | | |
| 2026 | Vadam | | |
| 2026 | TN 2026 | Andalamma | |
| 2026 | Karuppu | Selvi | |
| 2026 | Chennai Love Story | Chennai CMTC bus passenger | Telugu film |
| 2026 | Vishwanath & Sons | Child welfare committee member | |
| 2026 | Singgaramm | | |

=== Television ===
| Year | Title | Role | Channel | Notes |
|---|---|---|---|---|
| 2002–2003 | Metti Oli | Meena | Sun TV | Acting Debut |
| 2005–2006 | Muhurtham | | Sun TV | |
| 2005–2007 | Malargal | Revathy | Sun TV | |
| 2006–2009 | Kolangal | Sundhari Rajesh | Sun TV | |
| 2007–2010 | Megala | Thamarai | Sun TV | |
| 2012–2013 | Karthigai Pengal | | Sun TV | |
| 2015 | Vani Rani | Muthupechi | Sun TV | |
| 2014–2017 | Maragatha Veenai | Sundari | Sun TV | |
| 2016–2018 | Saravanan Meenatchi (season 2) | Pazhaniyammal | Vijay TV | |
| 2018–2020 | Lakshmi Stores | Ponnamma | Sun TV | Bilingual TV series |
| 2019 | Lakshmi Stores | Shanthamma | Gemini TV | |
| 2019 | Bharathi Kannamma | Shenbagam | Star Vijay | Photo appearance only |
| 2019–2020 | Nachiyapuram | Saraswathi | Zee Tamil | |
| 2020–2022 | Senthoora Poove | Mariamma | Star Vijay | |
| 2020–2021 | Anbudan Kushi | Rajeshwari | Star Vijay | |
| 2020-2021 | Cooku With Comali Season 2 | Contestant | Star Vijay | |
| 2021 | Mr and Mrs Chinnathirai season 3 | Contestant | Star Vijay | |
| 2021 | Comedy Raja Kalakkal Rani | 2nd Runner-up | Star Vijay | |
| 2022 | Raju Vootla Party | Raju's mother | Star Vijay | |
| 2022 | Abhi Tailor | Kamakshi | Colors Tamil | Cameo appearance |
| 2022 | Idhu Solla Marandha Kadhai | Chandrakala | Colors Tamil | |
| 2022–2024 | Meenakshi Ponnunga | Shantha | Zee Tamil | |
| 2023 | Vidhya No.1 | Deepa Laxmi | Zee Tamil | Cameo Appearance |
| 2023 | Bharathi Kannamma 2 | Bhakyalakshmi | Star Vijay | |
| 2024 | Seetha Raman | Sevappi | Zee Tamil | |
| 2024 | Top Cooku Dupe Cooku (season 1) | Dupe Cooku | Sun TV | |
| 2025 | Parijatham | Pattammal | Zee Tamil | Cameo Appearance |
| 2026 | Gettimelam | Sakuntala | Zee Tamil | Cameo Appearance |

=== Dubbing artist ===
| Year | Actress | Title | Notes |
|---|---|---|---|
| 2008 | Poornima Indrajith | Kolangal | Dubbed for Chellamma character |
| 2019 | Rama | Namma Veetu Pillai | |
| 2025 | Radha | Ethirneechal Thodargirathu | Dubbed for Sub-Inspector Thamaraiselvi character |

== Awards and nominations ==
| Year | Work | Award | Category | Result | Ref. |
|---|---|---|---|---|---|
| 2021 | Anbudan Kushi | Vijay Television Awards | Best Mother | Nominated | |
| 2021 | Anbudan Kushi | Vijay Television Awards | Best Mamiyar | Nominated | |
| 2022 | Doctor | 10th South Indian International Movie Awards | Best Actor in a Comic Role (Tamil) | Won | |
| 2023 | Meenakshi Ponnunga | Zee Tamil Kudumba Virudugal 2022 | Best Comedian | Nominated | |
| 2023 | Vidhya No.1 | Zee Tamil Golden Moments Awards - 2023 | Best Comedian | Won | |
