= Sarkaar With Jiiva =

2022 Indian television series

- Original title: சர்கார் வித் ஜீவா
- Genre: Quiz; Reality; Game show
- Directed by: Joshua Preetham
- Presented by: Jiiva
- Country of origin: India
- Original language: Tamil
- No. of seasons: 1
- No. of episodes: 13

Production
- Production location: Tamil Nadu
- Camera setup: Multi-camera
- Running time: approx.50-60 minutes per episode
- Production company: Wave Media

Original release
- Network: aha Tamil; Colors Tamil
- Release: 16 September – 9 December 2022

Sarkaar With Jiiva (சர்கார் வித் ஜீவா) is a 2022 Indian Tamil-language reality television show, produced as an Original for Aha Tamil. The show's first season was hosted by Jiiva.

The web shows premiered on the television channel Colors Tamil starting from 10 December 2022.

== Series overview ==
=== Streaming ===
Series	Episodes	Originally released	
Series	Episodes	First released	Last released
1	13	16 September 2022	9 December 2022

=== Television broadcast ===
Series	Episodes	Originally released	
Series	Episodes	First released	Last released
1	13	10 December 2022	present

== Episodes ==
Episodes	Airing	Contestants	Team
1	16 September 2022	Venkat Prabhu, Vaibhav Reddy, Premgi Amaren, Yuvan Shankar Raja	VP Gang
2	23 September 2022	Atharvaa, Tanya Ravichandran, Chinni Jayanth, Sam Anton	Trigger Team
3	30 September 2022	Robo Shankar, Dheena, Bala Saravanan, Jagan	Comedians
4	7 October 2022	Jai, Malvika Sharma, Samyuktha, Aishwarya Dutta	Coffee with Kadhal film Team
5	14 October 2022	Baba Bhaskar, Sridhar, Ashok Raja, Sherif	Dance Masters
6	21 October 2022	Anjana Rangan, Keerthi Shanthanu, RJ Vijay, VJ Pappu	Hosts
7	28 October 2022	RJ Vigneshkanth, Aneessh, Sriram, Shah Ra	Youtubers
8	4 November 2022	Mano, Anuradha Sriram, Kalpana Raghavendar, Krish	Singers
9	11 November 2022	Bharath, Vani Bhojan, Rajkumar, M. Sakthivel	Miral film Team
10	18 November 2022	Madurai Muthu, Azhar, Saravanakumar, Ramar	KPY Team
11	25 November 2022	Santhosh Narayanan, Vijay Narain, Gana Muthu, Anandhu	Sana and Gang
12	2 December 2022	Karate Raja, Thalapathy Dinesh, Besant Ravi, Sampath Ram	Fight Masters
13	9 December 2022	Bala, Kuraishi, Sarath, Manimegalai	Kpy Bala Ganga
