= Ranjithame =

- Genre: Family; Drama
- Created by: Vikatan Televistas
- Screenplay by: C.U Muthuselvan; Alvin Prashant Raj; Jagan; V.Padmavathy
- Directed by: M. Iniyan Dinesh; Dhamayanthi
- Creative director: Vikatan Televistas
- Starring: Shiv Sathish; Manishajith; Roopa Sree
- Theme music composer: Kiran
- Opening theme: Ranjithame
- Country of origin: India
- Original language: Tamil
- No. of seasons: 1
- No. of episodes: 436

Production
- Executive producer: R.Umesh Kumaran
- Cinematography: Sumee Baskaran; S.T Martz; Arun Nair
- Editor: B.Chandru
- Camera setup: Multi-camera
- Running time: approx. 20–22 minutes per episode
- Production companies: Kalaignar Media; Vikatan Televistas

Original release
- Network: Kalaignar TV
- Release: 17 July 2023 – 14 December 2024

Ranjithame (transl. 'Pleasant') is a 2023 Indian Tamil-language television series directed by M. Iniyan Dinesh and produced by Vikatan Televistas. The show stars Shiv Sathish, Manishajith and Roopa Sree in lead role. It began airing on Kalaignar TV in 2023 and ended on 14 December 2024 with 436 episodes, streams on Vikatan TV YouTube channel.

== Plot ==
In the bustling streets of a quaint town nestled amidst rolling hills, there lived a young woman named Ranjitha. Despite the serenity of her surroundings, her life was far from tranquil. Ranjitha found herself caught in the suffocating grip of familial expectations, particularly within the confines of her sister's home. The sanctuary she sought had turned into a battleground, with her brother-in-law's unwelcome advances serving as a constant reminder of the vulnerability she faced as a woman. Ranjitha made the decision to flee the suffocating confines of her sister's home, leaving behind the familiar comforts but also the shackles of societal norms that sought to confine her. Will she ever overcome the obstacles that her brother in law set for her and please Vedavelli and marry Arun, her one true love?

Meanwhile, in another corner of the town, stood Arun, a man whose kindness was as boundless as the love he held for his family. Raised by a doting mother and surrounded by three adoring sisters, Arun's life seemed to unfold in perfect harmony with the expectations set by his loving family. Yet, beneath the facade of contentment, Arun wrestled with his own internal conflicts, torn between the duty he owed to his family and the desires that stirred within his heart. Fate, it seemed, had intertwined the paths of Ranjitha and Arun, two souls seeking solace amidst the chaos of their lives. As they crossed each other's paths, their hearts resonated with an unspoken understanding, kindling a flame of love that refused to be extinguished. But love, as they say, is not without its trials. As Ranjitha and Arun embarked on their journey of love, they found themselves confronted by the formidable barrier of Arun's mother, Vedhavalli. A woman of unwavering resolve and traditional values, Vedhavalli stood as a formidable obstacle in the path of their love, her ego clashing with Ranjitha's fierce independence.

== Cast ==
=== Main cast ===
- Manishajith as Ranjitha Arun, wife of Arun, daughter-in-law of Vedha and Rathnam, sister-in-law of Vidhya, Sudha and Chitra (Female Protagonist)
- Shiv Sathish as Arun Rathnam, son of Vedha and Rathnam, younger brother of Vidhya, elder brother of Sudha and Chitra (Male Protagonist)

=== Supporting ===
- Madhumikha Srinivasu as Vidhya Rathnam, elder daughter of Vedha and Rathnam, elder sister of Arun, Sudha and Chitra
- Yuvanraj Nethrun / Sathya Sudhakar as Sundaramurthy "Sundar", husband of Seethalakshmi, younger brother of Vedha and younger brother–in–law of Rathnam and maternal uncle of Vidhya, Arun, Sudha and Chithra
- Akila as Seethalakshmi "Simran" Sundar, wife of Sundar, younger sister–in–law of Vedhavalli and younger sister of Rathnam and maternal aunt of Vidhya, Arun, Sudha and Chithra
- Sandhyadhaiyan as Sudha Rathnam, 2nd daughter of Vedha and Rathnam, 1st younger sister of Vidhya and Arun, 2nd elder sister of Chitra
- Chippu Chippy / Unknown as Chitra Rathnam, last daughter of Vedha and Rathnam, last sister of Vidhya, Arun and Sudha
- Ramnath Shetty as Rathnakumar "Rathnam", husband of Vedha, elder brother-in-law of Sundar, elder brother of Seethalakshmi, father of Vidhya, Arun, Sudha and Chitra
- Roopa Sree as Vedhavalli "Vedha" Rathnam, wife of Rathnam, mother of Vidhya, Arun, Sudha and Chitra, elder sister of Sundar, elder sister–in–law of Seethalakshmi
- Avinash / Tharun Appasamy as Ravi, a womanizer who cheats Sudha and Chitra in the name of love
- Subbulakshmi / Unknown / Dhanu Shiva as Gomathi Dheenan, wife of Dheenan and elder sister of Ranjitha
- Hari Krishnan as Dheenadhayalan "Dheena / Dheenan", husband of Gomathi and brother–in–law of Ranjitha who has an obsession on Ranjitha and desire to marry her (Male Antagonist)
- Unknown / Pradeepa Muthu / Shakthi Rao as Kalpana, Vidhya's sister–in–law who seeks revenge on her elder brother's death (Secondary Antagonist)
- Padmini Chandrasekaran as Kalpana's mother and Vidhya's ex–mother–in–law

== Production ==
=== Development ===
On 26 February 2021 Vikatan Televistas confirmed Sun TV's old serial (Nayagi and Deivamagal) going to re-telecast on Kalaignar TV from 1 March 2021. By the end of February 2023, Kalaignar TV confirmed through a press release that it would distribute new Tamil serial, to be produced by Vikatan Televistas. Initially, the title of the serial was named Unnai Ninaithu. It was later renamed as Ranjithame and the first promo was released on 12 June 2023.

=== Casting ===
Actress Manishajith was cast in the female lead role as Rajani. She has already played the lead role in Uyire and Kannathil Muthamittal serials. Barathi Kannamma fame Roopa Sree plays the mother role as Vedhavalli. Minnale fame Shiv Sathish plays her son and male lead role as Arun. In October 2023, Avinash was replaced by Tharun Appasamy. By the end of October 2023, actress Nancy joined the series.

=== Release ===
The first promo was released on 12 June 2023 featuring Shiv Sathishm, Manishajith and Roopa Sree. The second promo was unveiled on 17 July 2023, featuring protagonist Manishajith and Roopa Sree and revealing the release date.
