= Nitish Veera =

Indian actor (died 2021)

- Born: 1975 or 1976 (age 50–51)
- Died: May 18, 2021 (aged 45)
- Occupation: Actor
- Years active: 2000-2021

Nitish Veera (1975/6 – 17 May 2021) was an Indian actor who worked in Tamil-language films.

== Career ==
Veera portrayed small roles in several of them including Pudhupettai (2006) and Vennila Kabadi Kuzhu (2009). He contacted Pa. Ranjith who gave him the role of Kathiravan, Rajinikanth and Eashwari Rao's son in Kaala (2018). He shot for the film for 40 days. Veera went on to portray an important role in Asuran (2019). In the film, he played a character that lived in the 1960s. He was signed to play a pivotal role in Laabam. The post production of his upcoming film Bell was in progress and was slated for a late 2021 to early 2022 release. He recently completed dubbing for his part in the film. Due to his untimely death, the makers roped in Sridhar to reprise his role and changed the film's storyline.

== Death ==
He died from COVID-19 on 17 May 2021, at the age of 45.

== Filmography ==
- Vallarasu (2000; uncredited)
- Anjaneya (2003)
- Thirupaachi (2005; uncredited)
- Chandramukhi (2005; uncredited)
- Pudhupettai (2006)
- Perarasu (2006)
- Onbadhu Roobai Nottu (2007)
- Vennila Kabadi Kuzhu (2009)
- Sindhanai Sei (2009)
- Kazhugu (2012)
- Haridas (2013)
- Netru Indru (2014)
- Puriyadha Anandam Puthithaga Arambam (2015)
- Enga Amma Rani (2017)
- Sathriyan (2017)
- Padaiveeran (2018)
- Kaala (2018)
- Azhagumagan (2018)
- Peranbu (2019)
- Airaa (2019)
- Neeya 2 (2019)
- Raatchasi (2019)
- Vennila Kabaddi Kuzhu 2 (2019)
- Asuran (2019)
- Ettuthikkum Para (2020)
- Laabam (2021; posthumous release)
- Taanakkaran (2022; posthumous release)
- Bell (2023; posthumous release)
- Beep (2026; posthumous release)

Television

- Suzhal: The Vortex (2022; posthumous release)
