= Manisha Jith =

Indian actress

- Occupation: Actress
- Years active: 2004; 2013–present

Manisha Jith is an Indian actress who works in Tamil-language films.

== Career ==
Manisha Jith made her debut with Gambeeram (2004) in which she played Sarath Kumar's daughter. She played a child artist in nearly forty films. She made her debut as a heroine with Nanbargal Kavanathirku starring Sanjeev. In 2015, she starred in Vindhai opposite former child actor Mahendran and the horror film Kamara Kattu. She starred in several low-budget films including Thirappu Vizha, which was based on the TASMAC protests, and Enakku Innum Kalyanam Aagala starring Jagan. In 2020, she portrayed the lead role in the television serial Uyire; however, she was replaced by Shree Gopika after she fell unconscious on the sets. In July 2022, her film Kichi Kichi was released, co-starring with television anchor Azhar.

== Filmography ==
- All films are in Tamil, unless otherwise noted.

Year	Film	Role	Notes
2004	Gambeeram	Krithika	child artiste credited as Monica
2013	Mouna Mazhai	Kayal	
2014	Nanbargal Kavanathirku	Vennila	
2015	Thirappu Vizha		
2015	Kamara Kattu	Poongodi	
2015	Vindhai	Kavya	
2017	Inaya Thalaimurai		
2019	Vanakilli Bharathi	Vanakilli	
2019	Vakiba		
2019	Enakku Innum Kalyanam Aagala		
2020	Pizhai		
2020	Alti	Mary	
2021	Engada Iruthinga Ivvalavu Naala	Kanimozhi	
2021	Appathava Aattaya Pottutanga	Shanmugham's daughter	credited as Rehana
2023	Kichi Kichi		
2024	Aaraichi		
2024	Thimil		
2024	Aaryamala	Malar	

=== Television ===
Year	Serials	Role	Channel	Notes
2020	Uyire	Pavithra	Colors Tamil	Replaced by Shreegopika Neelanath
2022	Kannathil Muthamittal	Aadhira	Zee Tamil	Replaced by Padaine Kumar
2023–present	Ranjithame	Rajitha Arun	Kalaignar TV	
