= Bell (2023 film) =

- Theatrical release poster
- Directed by: R. Vengat Bhuvan
- Written by: Veyilon R. Vengat Bhuvan
- Produced by: Peter Chakravarthy; David Nalachakravarthy
- Starring: Guru Somasundaram; Sridhar; Nitish Veera
- Cinematography: Bharanikannan
- Edited by: Thiagarajan; Vignesh RL
- Music by: Robert
- Production company: Brogan Movies
- Release date: 9 June 2023
- Country: India
- Language: Tamil

Bell is a 2023 Indian Tamil-language romantic drama film directed by R. Vengat Bhuvan and starring Guru Somasundaram, Sridhar and Nitish Veera in the lead roles. It was released on 9 June 2023.

== Cast ==
- Guru Somasundaram as Brahma
- Sridhar as Bell
- Nitish Veera as Bell
- Petter Raj
- Jack Arunachalam as Kavin
- Kalki
- Durga
- Swetha
- Josephine
- Yogi Ram

== Production ==
Nitish Veera's death in April 2021 prompted the makers to rework the film's script, with Sridhar's character portraying another version of Veera's character.

== Reception ==
The film was released on 9 June 2023 across Tamil Nadu. Rating the film 0.5/5 stars, Logesh Balachandran of The Times of India wrote "when makers forget to develop a one-line into a proper feature script, this is what the result will look like" and that "though the core idea is good, Bell suffers from amateurish filmmaking and lacklustre performances, ultimately resulting in a disappointing viewing experience". Prashanth Vallavan of Cinema Express wrote "the film struggles to present a story that was mangled, to begin with" and "despite some sincere performances, the problems are further exacerbated by an unfocused creative vision".
