= 7up Thamizh Naattin Kural =

- Genre: Singing show Reality
- Judges: A. R. Rahman
- Country of origin: India
- Original language: Tamil

Production
- Camera setup: Multi-camera
- Running time: approx. 85–90 minutes per episode
- Production company: 7 Up

Original release
- Network: Colors Tamil
- Release: 2018

7Up Thamizh Naattin Kural is a 2018 Tamil-language musical reality TV show. It is airing on Colors Tamil. The show is about inviting entries from across the state, with a chance to be one of seven lucky voices to sing with A.R Rahman on stage.
