= Pokkiri Mannan =

2015 Indian film by Ragomadhesh

- Release poster
- Directed by: Ragomadhesh
- Written by: Ragomadhesh
- Produced by: Ramesh Reddy
- Starring: Sridhar; Spoorthi
- Cinematography: Cinetech Suri
- Music by: Indhiravarman
- Production company: Srinidhi Films
- Distributed by: Thanigaivel
- Release date: 4 September 2015
- Country: India
- Language: Tamil

Pokkiri Mannan (transl. Rogue king) is a 2015 Indian Tamil-language action film directed by Ragomadhesh and starring choreographer Sridhar in his lead debut opposite Kannada actress Spoorthi Suresh with Singampuli in an important role. Producer Ramesh Reddy plays the antagonist.

== Cast ==
- Sridhar as Marudhu
- Spoorthi as Archana
- Singampuli as Kali
- Mayilsamy as Marudhu's father
- Ramesh Reddy as Teja
- Vishwanth as Marudhu's friend

== Soundtrack ==
Music by Indhiravarman.

- "Thejavoda" - Velmurugan, Deepa
- "Oothu Oothu" - Rahul Nambiar
- "Bhoom Bhoom" - Doggy Josie, Anuradha Paudwal
- "Kaiyodu Kai" - Haricharan, Pooja

== Release ==
The film released on 4 September alongside Paayum Puli and Savaale Samaali after the Tamil Film Producers Council moved its strike.

== Reception ==
A critic from The Times of India rated the film 1/5 and said "the film is as infuriating as nails on a chalkboard". Malini Mannath of The New Indian Express criticised the film and opined that "There is a sense of deja vu throughout, the plot seeming like a weak copy of earlier such formula flicks". A critic from Dinakaran criticised the film's plot holes. A critic from Dinamalar criticised the film's lack of story. A critic from Maalaimalar praised the cast's performance.
