= Vindhai =

2015 film by Lawraa

- Directed by: Lawraa
- Written by: Lawraa
- Produced by: R.L. Yesudoss
- Starring: Mahendran; Manisha Jith
- Cinematography: Rathish Kannana
- Edited by: Nathipuyal
- Music by: V. Williams
- Production company: Annai Pudhumai Madha Films
- Release date: 22 May 2015
- Country: India
- Language: Tamil

Vindhai (transl. Wonder) is a 2015 Indian comedy drama directed by Lawraa and starring Mahendran and Manishajith.

== Synopsis ==
Karthi and Kavya are arrested by the police for a false accusations who were bought to the police station, there they come across many new faces and people.

== Cast ==
- Mahendran as Karthi
- Manisha Jith as Kavya
- Manobala as Nadhawara Koshti
- M. S. Bhaskar as Tamizhaayndha Nallon aka Sivasubramanian
- Mahanadhi Shankar as Inspector
- Nellai Siva as Head constable
- Sivanarayana Moorthy as Head constable
- Aadesh Bala as Sub-inspector
- Vani Sri Shetty as Lady Inspector
- Muthukaalai
- Issac Varghese as police officer
- Scissor Manohar
- Kadhal Saravanan
- T. Ravi as Kavya's father
- Jaganathan as Karthi's father
- Senthi Kumari as Kavya's mother
- Gowthami Vembunathan as Karthi's mother
- Sumathi G.
- Telephone Raj
- Thavasi
- V. M. Subburaj as drunkard
- Kovai Babu
- TSR Srinivasan as percussionist
- TKS

== Production ==
The film is directed by Lawraa, who previously directed Varnam (2011). The film is about a young couple who gets sent to jail because the girl is under age and how they get drawn into other cases which take place at the jail. Former child artistes Mahendran and Manishajith play the lead roles.

== Release ==
The Times of India gave the film a rating of one out of five stars and wrote that " It seems a good idea on paper but the writing and filmmaking is just abysmal that the only vindhai (transl. wonder) here is that the director managed to find someone this gullible to produce this tripe". A critic from The New Indian Express opined that "The plot enacted within the police station, had the potential to turn into an interesting comic caper, if only the screenplay had been better planned". Maalai Malar criticized the screenplay and the cinematography while praising the performances of Manishajith and M. S. Bhaskar.
