= Vellum Thiramai =

2022 Indian talent television show

- Original title: வெல்லும் திறமை
- Genre: Reality; Talent show
- Presented by: VJ Andrews; Syamantha Kiran
- Judges: Nikki Galrani; Sridhar; Shihan Hussaini
- Country of origin: India
- Original language: Tamil
- No. of seasons: 1
- No. of episodes: 20

Production
- Production location: Tamil Nadu
- Camera setup: Multi-camera
- Running time: approx.42-45 minutes per episode
- Production company: Frames Production

Original release
- Network: Colors Tamil
- Release: 4 June – 30 October 2022

Related
- Hunarbaaz: Desh Ki Shaan

Vellum Thiramai (வெல்லும் திறமை) is a 2022 Indian-Tamil-language talent television show aired on Colors Tamil. The judges were Nikki Galrani, Sridhar and Shihan Hussaini, and the hosts were VJ Andrews and Syamantha Kiran. The first season, which contained twenty episodes, premiered on 4 June and ended on 30 October 2022. It was made available for streaming in selected markets on Voot.

The first season was won by Drona Academy. The show itself was based on Hindi-language Colors TV's show Hunarbaaz: Desh Ki Shaan.

== Overview ==
Season	Episodes	Original Broadcast		Winner	Runner up
Season	Episodes	First Aired	Last Aired	Winner	Runner up
1	20	4 June 2022	30 October 2022	Drona Academy	JDC

== Judges and Hosts ==
=== Judges ===
season	Judges	Notes
1	Nikki Galrani	Indian actress known for her works in Tamil and Malayalam films.
1	Sridhar	Indian choreographer who has worked in across India's several regional film industries.
1	Shihan Hussaini	Indian karate expert, who has also worked as an actor in Tamil language films and Television shows.

=== Hosts ===
season	Judges
1	VJ Andrews
1	Syamantha Kiran

== Winners ==
The first season was won by Drona Academy with a cash prize of Rs 2.5 lakh, 1st Runner-up was won by JDC a cash prize of Rs 1.24 lakh.

season	Team	Winner	prize
1	Drona Academy	Winner	₹ 2,500,00
1	JDC	1st Runner-up(s)	₹ 1,240,00
1	Yova Yoga Academy	2nd Runner-up(s)	₹ 75,000

== Airing history ==
The show premiered on Colors Tamil on 4 June 2022, and for the first fifteen episodes, aired Saturday at 19:00 IST. Starting on 11 September, the final five episodes were shifted to air every Sunday at 20:00 IST.

Aired	Time	Episode
4 June 2022 - 3 September 2022	Saturday; 19:00	1–15
11 September 2022 - 30 October 2022	Sunday; 20:00	16–20

== Production ==
=== Promotion ===
The show shoot began in April 2022 and the first promo was released on 1 May 2022 by revealing of the show title name by Bollywood film actress Parineeti Chopra.
