= Pachakili (TV series) =

- Genre: Family; Drama
- Written by: Vinisha Raji
- Screenplay by: A.C.Karnamurthy; Dialogue; Anandh Venu
- Directed by: A. Jawahar
- Starring: Monisha Arshak; Kishore; Stalin Muthu
- Country of origin: India
- Original language: Tamil
- No. of episodes: 118

Production
- Producer: S. Kushmavathy
- Cinematography: Isakkimuthu
- Editor: Ashok H.Anthony
- Camera setup: Single-camera
- Running time: approx.20-22 minutes per episode
- Production company: Estrella Stories LLP

Original release
- Network: Colors Tamil
- Release: 4 July – 9 December 2022

Pachakili is a 2022 Indian-Tamil-language Family drama television series, starring Monisha Arshak, Kishore and Stalin Muthu in main roles. It premiered on Colors Tamil on 4 July 2022 and ended on 9 December 2022, and aired on Monday to Friday at 19:30 and available for streaming in selected markets on Voot.

== Cast ==
=== Main ===
- Monisha Arshak as Pachakili
- Kishore – Adithya

=== Supporting ===
- Stalin Muthu as Meenakshi Sundaram
- Vijay Anand as Azhagar
- Ashwin Kumar as Velu

== Production ==
=== Casting ===
Actress Monisha Arshak was selected to play Pachakili's character who last appeared in 2022 TV series Naam Iruvar Namakku Iruvar 2 has received offer to appear in the series. Kishore was selected to play male protagonist opposite Actress Monisha Arshak. He is making their debut with the series. While Stalin Muthu, Vijay Anand and Ashwin Kumar were also selected for supporting roles.

=== Release ===
The first promo was unveiled on 9 June 2022, featuring The series name. The second promo was unveiled on 15 June 2022, featuring the protagonists and revealing the release date.
