= Jamelaa (TV series) =

2022 Indian family drama TV series

- Original title: ஜமீலா
- Genre: Family; Drama
- Written by: Aiswaryan Siddique
- Directed by: Asif Kuraishi
- Creative director: Radikaa Sarathkumar
- Starring: Tanvi Rao; Ajay
- Composer: Rizwan
- Country of origin: India
- Original language: Tamil
- No. of episodes: 70

Production
- Producer: Rayane R Mithun
- Editors: K.Bharath Kumar; K.Pandydurai
- Camera setup: Single-camera
- Running time: approx.20-22 minutes per episode
- Production company: Radaan Mediaworks

Original release
- Network: Colors Tamil
- Release: 10 October 2022 – 12 January 2023

Jamelaa (ஜமீலா) is a 2022 Indian-Tamil-language family drama television series airing on Colors Tamil. The series stars Tanvi Rao and Ajay. It premiered on Colors Tamil on 10 October 2022, and ended on 12 January 2023 with 70 episodes. It is available for streaming in select markets on Voot. The show is produced by Rayane Mithun under Radaan Mediaworks.

The series is set in an Islamic background as a new venture in the world of Tamil serials.

== Cast ==
=== Main cast ===
- Tanvi Rao as Jamelaa
- Ajay as Ananda Kannan a.k.a. AK

=== Recurring cast ===
- Gowtham Sundararajan as Hanifa: Jamelaa's Father
- Aishwarya Bhaskaran as Saleema: Jamelaa's Mother
- Basha as Sikandar
- Hema as Jannat
- Sharvan as Dr. Nawaz
- Sonia as Dr. Mumtaz
- Shriram as Saddam
- Harishmitha as Nargis
- Preetha Suresh as Keerthi
- S. N. Parvathy as Gandhimathi
- Ravi Chandran as Ravi
- Poovilangu Mohan as Dakshinamurthy: AK's Father
- Meera Krishnan / Anitha Venkat as Maragatham: AK's Mother
- VJ Lekha as RJ Kanmani
- Kia as RJ Rbbas
- Caroline Hiltrud as Laila
- Dheeraj Vishnu Rathnam as Kasim

== Production ==
=== Casting ===
Newcomer Kannada television actress Tanvi Rao was cast in the female lead role as Jamelaa.

=== Development ===
At the end of May end 2022, Colors Tamil confirmed through a press release that it would distribute a new Tamil Muslim series.
