= Dance vs Dance season 2 =

Dance vs Dance
- Season 2
- Hosted by: Sarumathi; RJ Sha; Bhavana Balakrishnan
- Judges: Khushboo Sundar; Brinda
- Winners: Manoj and Amritha
- Runners-up: Prithvi and Thiyan
- No. of episodes: 25

Release
- Original network: Colors Tamil
- Original release: 17 October 2021 – 9 January 2022

Season chronology
- ← Previous; Dance vs Dance (season 2) Next → Dance vs Dance (season 3)

Dance VS Dance Season 2 is the second season of the Tamil reality dancing TV show Dance vs Dance, was aired on Colors Tamil from 17 October 2021. The finals of the show concluded on 9 January 2022 with Manoj and Amritha finishing as the winner, taking home a shared 5 lakh prize money. The show was hosted by Bhavana Balakrishnan. The competition was judged by former actress Khushboo Sundar and dance choreographer Brinda.

== Contestants ==
The show started off with 16 pairs of dancers and a pair was eliminated every week until the quarter-final week where 2 couples faced spot elimination. The following were the contestants who managed to participate in the finals of the show:

- Manoj and Amritha
- Prithvi and Thiyan
- Kavya and Mahalakshmi
- Royson and Mercina
- Vinosh and Kabeer
- Karthick and Thiyagu

Final Standings
Contestants	Ranking
Manoj and Amritha	Winner
Prithvi and Thiyan	1st Runner-Up
Kavya and Mahalakshmi	2nd Runner-Up
Royson and Mercina	3rd Runner-Up
Vinosh and Kabeer	Finalist
Karthick and Thiyagu	Finalist
Alhena and Ayshu	Semi-Finalist
Anjana and Abhiraj	Semi-Finalist
Navalarasan and Alisha	Semi-Finalist
Hari and Priya	Eliminated
Abhirami and Madhuri	Eliminated
Anusha and Kushi	Eliminated
Sandy and Nandhika	Eliminated
Sidharth and Rahit	Eliminated
