= Run Baby Run (game show) =

Indian game show

- Genre: Reality; Game show
- Presented by: Jagan
- Country of origin: India
- Original language: Tamil
- No. of seasons: 1
- No. of episodes: 23

Production
- Camera setup: Multi-camera
- Running time: approx. 40-45 minutes per episode

Original release
- Network: Zee Tamil
- Release: 27 February – 7 August 2022

Run Baby Run is a 2022 Indian-Tamil language Reality game show, hosted by Jagan. The series was on Zee Tamil. It is also available on the digital platform on ZEE5. to 7 August 2022. It is also available for streaming on ZEE5.

== Format ==
The show features Zee Tamil's soap opera families and Tamil actors.

== List of episodes ==
Episodes	Celebrities		Telecast date
Episodes	Red Team	Blue Team	Telecast date
#1	Samyuktha; Aishwarya; Aajeedh Khalique	Mahendran; Meenakshi Govindarajan; Gayathri	27 February 2022
