= Kanda Naal Mudhal (TV series) =

Indian television series

- Original title: கண்ட நாள் முதல்
- Genre: Family; Drama
- Written by: Radhi Bala dialogue Anandh Venu
- Directed by: Radhakrishnan
- Starring: Navin Kumar; Dharshana Ashokan; Rashmitha; Arun Rajan
- Country of origin: India
- Original language: Tamil

Production
- Producer: S. Kushvamathi
- Camera setup: Single-camera
- Running time: approx.20-22 minutes per episode
- Production company: Estrella Stories LLP

Original release
- Network: Colors Tamil
- Release: 13 June – 30 December 2022

Kanda Naal Mudhal (கண்ட நாள் முதல்) is a 2022 Indian-Tamil-language family drama television series, starring Navin, Dharshana Ashokan, Rashmitha and Arun Rajan. It premiered on Colors Tamil on 13 June 2022, and airs Monday to Friday at 20:30 and available for streaming in selected markets on Voot.

== Cast ==
=== Main ===
- Navin Kumar as Kumaran: a police constable; Archana's younger brother; Nandini's husband
- Dharshana Ashokan as Nandhini: a modern IT girl, Nagulan's younger sister; Kumaran's wife
- Rashmitha as Archana: Kumaran's elder sister; Nakulan's wife
- Arun Rajan as Nakulan: Nandini's elder brother; Archana's husband

=== Supporting ===
- Meena Kumari as Lakshmi: Nakulan and Nandini's mother; Sivamani's wife
- Rishikeshav as Sivamani: Nakulan; Nandini's father; Lakshmi's husband
- Kiran Mai as Then
- Anuradha as Thaai Kezhavi: Sivamani's mother

=== Special appearances ===
- Ajay Rathnam - IG Ravi
- Sanjeev Venkat - Pulikutty

== Production ==
=== Casting ===
Neethane Enthan Ponvasantham fame Dharshana will play the lead role along with Idhayathai Thirudathe fame Navin Kumar. Meena Kumari and Rishikeshav are collaborating after the 2017-2011 TV series Magal. Rashmitha was selected to play the role of Archana and Arun Rajan was selected to play the role of Nagulan. Arun Rajan last appeared in the Sun TV series Poove Unakkaga in 2020-2022. Sanjeev Venkat and Anuradha joined the cast in August 2022.
