= Manthira Punnagai (TV series) =

- Original title: மந்திர புன்னகை
- Genre: Romance; Thriller
- Written by: Suriya dialogue Karthik Mahadevan
- Directed by: Vikramathithan
- Starring: Supritha Sathyanarayan; Niyaz; Hussain Ahamed Khan
- Country of origin: India
- Original language: Tamil
- No. of episodes: 81

Production
- Producers: Murali Rama Narayanan; Thanga Ganapathy.R
- Cinematography: Prabakar Devaraj
- Editor: Tamilmani.V
- Camera setup: Single-camera
- Running time: approx.20-22 minutes per episode
- Production company: Thenandal Studio Limited

Original release
- Network: Colors Tamil
- Release: 1 August – 25 November 2022

Related
- Ishq Mein Marjawan 2

Manthira Punnagai (transl. Mystic smile) is a 2022 Indian-Tamil-language romantic thriller drama television series. It is based on Hindi-language Colors TV's drama series Ishq Mein Marjawan 2, written by Sameer Siddiqui.

It starred Supritha Sathyanarayan, Niyaz and Hussain Ahamed Khan and produced by Thenandal Studio Limited. It premiered on Colors Tamil on 1 August 2022 and ended abruptly on 25 November 2022 with 81 episodes, and aired on Monday to Friday at 21:30 and available for streaming in selected markets on Voot.

== Cast ==
=== Main ===
- Mersheena Neenu / Supritha Sathyanarayan as Gayathiri: Kathir’s Ex Lover, Guru’s Wife
- Niyaz Khan as Guru: Gayathiri's husband
- Hussain Ahamed Khan as Kathir: A Cunning Cop, Gayathiri Ex Lover and Guru’s step brother (Main Antagonist)

=== Supporting ===
- Saravana Subbiah
- Vadivukkarasi - Lakshmi Paati: (Guru and Priya’s Grandmother)
- Nayana Raj as Sandhya (Gayathiri's Sister)
- Nalinikanth as Ramaiya (House helper, Guru’s welwisher)
- Punitha Balakrishnan as Priya (Guru’s Sister, Pravin's love interest)
- Priya Tharun as Saradha (Kathir Mother, Guru’s step mother)
- V.Dasarathy as Viswanathan (Janaki's husband, Pravin and Preeta father)
- Rajeshwary as Janaki (Viswanathan's wife, Pravin and Preeta mother)
- Mithun Raj as Pravin
- Gokila Gopal as Preeta
- -- as Mithra (Gayathiri's best friend)

== Production ==
=== Casting ===
The role of Gayathri was initially given to Mersheena Neenu, but later given to Supritha Suryanarayan in October 2022. Hussain Ahamed Khan was cast as Kathir, Niyaz was cast as Guru. Saravana Subbiah and Vadivukkarasi were cast in supporting roles
