= Super Mom (TV series) =

- Genre: Children; Reality; Talent show
- Presented by: Archana Chandhoke (S1–S3); Zaara Vineet (S1–S3); VJ Vijay (Super Mom Reunion); Poornitha (Super Mom Reunion)
- Judges: Priya Raman (Super Mom Reunion); Khushbu (Season 3)
- Country of origin: India
- Original language: Tamil
- No. of seasons: 3
- No. of episodes: 34+1 (Special Episode)

Production
- Production location: Tamil Nadu
- Camera setup: Multi-camera
- Running time: approx. 60–70 minutes per episode (seasons 1 & 3) approx. 120–150 minutes per episode (Super Mom Reunion)

Original release
- Network: Zee Tamil
- Release: 4 November 2018 – present

Related
- DID Super Moms

Super Mom is a 2018 Indian-Tamil-language children reality television show airs on Zee Tamil and streamed on ZEE5. Over four years, Super Mom has rolled out three seasons and Archana Chandhoke and her daughter Zaara Vineet has continued as a host for three seasons.

The show about Tamil Television celebrity moms and their kids, where they indulge in various fun games and activities together. The winner of this game show will be crowned as the "Super Mom". The first season was premiered on 4 November 2018.

== Overview ==
Season	Episodes	Original Broadcast		Winner	Runner up	Aried
Season	Episodes	First Aired	Last Aired	Winner	Runner up	Aried
1	17	4 November 2018	3 March 2019	Swetha and Hrithik	Preethi Sanjeev and Laya	Sunday at 20:00
2	17	10 November 2019	8 March 2019	Devi and Yuvina Parthavi	Gayathri and Tharun	Sunday at 20:00
SE	1 Special Episode	28 November 2020				Sunday at 18:30 - 21:30
3	16	4 September 2022	1 January 2023	Roshini and Riya	Meera Krishna and Akshit	Sunday at 18:30 -20:00

== Season 1 ==
The first season aired on every Sunday at 20:00 from 4 November 2018 to 3 March 2019 and ended with 17 Episodes. The winner of the season was Television Actress Swetha and her son Hrithik. Actress Preethi and her daughter Laya was the runner-up, Deepa and her son Godwin and Krithika Laddu and her daughter Srika was Second Runner-up.

=== Contestants ===
- Anitha Venkat and Aishwarya
- Deepa and Godwin
- Jayashree and Rethva
- Krithika and Vishnu
- Krithika Laddu and Srika
- Monica and Jaden
- Preethi Sanjeev and Laya
- Swetha and Hrithik Bharathi
- Vanaja and Saisri Priyamvatha

== Season 2 ==
The second season aired on every Sunday at 20:00 from 10 November 2019 to 8 March 2019 and ended with 17 Episodes. The winner of the season was Devi and her daughter Yuvina Parthavi. Actress Gayathri and her son Tharun was the runner-up. Archana Chandhoke and her daughter Zaara Vineet has officially once again been appointed as the host for the second time.

=== Contestants ===
- Akila and Dhanaviruthika
- Anisha and Sasha
- Arthi and Theo
- Devi and Yuvina Parthavi
- Gayathri and Tharun
- Janaki and Makshi
- Neepa and Shreya
- Nithya and Boshika
- Shanthi and Tharak
- Sulabha and Samrith

== Season 3 ==
The show launched on 4 September 2022 on every Sunday at 18:30 on Zee Tamil and streamed on ZEE5. Archana Chandhoke and her daughter Zaara Vineet has officially once again been appointed as the host for the third time. Khushbu as the judge.

The final episode was aired on 1 January 2023 on Sunday at 5PM. The winner of the season was singer Roshini and his daughter Riya, Meera Krishna and Akshit was the runner-up.

- Winner: Roshini and Riya
- First Runners-Up: Meera Krishna and Akshit

=== Finalists ===
- Shalini and Riya
- Meera Krishnan and Akshit
- Sophia and Aarin
- Roshini and Riya
- Sasi Laya and Yugansarvesh

=== Contestants ===
- Abitha
- Amrutha and Aadiv
- Annabharathi and Ashikha
- Lakshmi Priya and Kiruthika
- Mennal and Anika
- Meera Krishna and Akshit
- Roshini and Riya
- Sasi Laya and Yugansarvesh
- Shalini and Riya
- Sophia and Aarin

=== Episodes ===
Episodes	Airing	Round	special guest
1	4 September 2022	The Grand Launch	
2	11 September 2022	Story, Thanks	
3	18 September 2022	In the Back-to-School round	Coffee with Kadhal Team (Srikanth, Aishwarya Dutta and Amritha Aiyer)
4	25 September 2022	Thaai Paasam Round	Coffee with Kadhal Team (Jiiva and Jai)
5	2 October 2022		
6	9 October 2022	In Super Mom and DJD S3 Mahasangamam	Sneha
7	16 October 2022	In the strongest Mummy round	
8	30 October 2022	In the Summa Pizhi round	
9	6 November 2022	In the Inaindha Kaigal round	Baba Bhaskar
10	13 November 2022		
11	20 November 2022		
12	27 November 2022		Prabhu Solomon, Kovai Sarala, Ashwin Kumar
13	4 December 2022		
14	18 December 2022		Radha
15	25 December 2022		
16	1 January 2023	Grand Finale	Baba Bhaskar

== Super Mom Reunion ==
Super Mom Reunion is a special show. It premiered on 28 November 2021.

=== Contestants ===
Season 1

- Deepa and Godwin
- Monica and Jaden
- Vanaja and Saisri Priyamvatha
- Swetha and Hrithik Bharathi

Season 2

- Akila and Dhanaviruthika
- Anisha and Sasha
- Arthi and Theo
- Devi and Yuvina Parthavi
- Gayathri and Tharun
- Neepa and Shreya
- Nithya and Boshika
- Shanthi and Tharak
- Sulabha and Samrith
