= Valli Thirumanam (TV series) =

- Genre: Romantic comedy Family; Drama
- Screenplay by: P.Maarimuthu
- Directed by: R. Deventhiran
- Starring: Nachathira; Shyam; Nalini; Gayatri Jayaraman
- Country of origin: India
- Original language: Tamil
- No. of seasons: 1
- No. of episodes: 275

Production
- Executive producer: Senkathirselvan
- Producers: Karthik Jayaram; Pradeep Athinarayanan
- Cinematography: K. Kesavan
- Editor: P.Arunkumar
- Camera setup: Multi-camera
- Running time: 22 minutes
- Production company: 4th Wall Media Works LLP

Original release
- Network: Colors Tamil
- Release: 3 January – 9 December 2022

Valli Thirumanam (transl. Valli's Marriage) is a 2022 Indian-Tamil-language Romantic comedy Family drama television series, starring Nachathira and Shyam. The show is produced by 4th Wall Media Works LLP of Karthik Jayaram and Pradeep Athinarayanan, that was premiered on 3 January 2022 and ended on 9 December 2022 with 275 episodes and aired on Colors Tamil and is also digitally available on Voot.

== Plot ==
The story follows the life of a mischievous girl Valli (Nachathira) who is a bold and arrogant money lender. Karthik (R.Shyam) a soft, Kind-hearted man searches for a bride who has the same quality as he does. Vadivu (Nalini), Valli's mother wants Valli to marry Karthik, as Vadivu thinks he was a good suitor for Valli. Due to Vadivu's compulsion, Valli projects herself as a soft girl and enters the life of Karthik. The rest of story concentrates on the marriage life of Valli.

== Cast ==
=== Main ===
- Nachathira as Valli Karthik
  - Karthik's wife and Vadivu's daughter, strict and she tries all the tricks to get her money back from the lenders.
- R. Shyam as Karthik
  - Valli's husband and Vasundhara's younger brother, is courteous and soft-spoken. He wants his better half to have the same attributes as he does.

=== Recurring ===
- Nalini as Vadivu – Valli's adopted mother
- Gayatri Jayaraman as Vasundhara – Karthik's adopted sister
- Akila Dora as Vanathi – Karthik's 1st elder sister
- Nanjil Vijayan as Gunduraasu – Valli's sidekick
- Sanjay Kumar Asrani as Shivraj – Vasundhara's husband
- Sreedevi Unnikrishnan as Pavithra – Karthik's niece
- Janane Prabhu as Uma – Karthik's 2nd elder sister
- Sethu Subbu as Manikandan – Uma's husband

=== Special appearances ===
- Shwetha Bandekar as Bhoomika
