= Namma Madurai Sisters =

- Genre: Family; Drama
- Created by: Colors Tamil
- Screenplay by: V. Pathmavathy; Dialogue; P.T Senthil Kumaran
- Directed by: Suresh Shanmugam
- Starring: Sruthi Lakshmi; Sunitha; Sankavi; Iraa Agarwal
- Country of origin: India
- Original language: Tamil
- No. of episodes: 166

Production
- Producer: S. Gowsalya Rani
- Cinematography: Balagurunathan dft
- Editor: Ashok Antony
- Camera setup: Multi camera
- Running time: 22 minutes
- Production company: SNS Movies

Original release
- Network: Colors Tamil
- Release: 21 February – 23 September 2022

Namma Madurai Sisters is a 2022 Indian-Tamil language drama television series starring Sruthi Lakshmi, Sunitha, Sankavi and Iraa Agarwal. It premiered on Colors Tamil 21 February 2022 and ended on 23 September 2022.

== Cast ==
=== Main ===
- Chaya Singh / Sruthi Lakshmi as Indhrani
- Sunitha as Meghala
- Sankavi as Bhuvana Shivakumar
- Iraa Agarwal as Kavya Nandakumar

=== Supporting ===
- Deepak Kumar as Nandakumar (Nanda)
- Harishankar Narayanan / Venkatesh as Shivakumar
- Parthan as Rajamanickam
- Rathan Ganapathy as Muthumanickam
- Aswanth Thilak as Ashwin

== Production ==
=== Casting ===
Chaya Singh was selected to play Indhrani, but was replaced by Sruthi Lakshmi in May 2022. Iraa Agarwal joined the cast in November 2021. Sunitha was selected to play Meghala and Sankavi as Bhuvana in December 2021. Deepak Kumar was cast, and he had to leave the series Endrendrum Punnagai.

=== Release ===
The first promo was released on 8 January 2021, and the second on 24 January 2021.

== Original soundtrack ==
=== Title song ===
"Thunindhu Vaa Nee" was sung by Vaikom Vijayalakshmi.

=== Soundtrack ===
Track listing
No.	Title	Singer(s)	Length
1.	"Thunindhu Vaa Nee (துணிந்து வா நீ)"	Vaikom Vijayalakshmi	1:00
