= Uyire (TV series) =

Indian television series

- Genre: Soap opera
- Written by: VPadmavathy
- Directed by: Sai Maruthu
- Starring: Manishajith; Amruth Kalam (Season 1) Aishwarya Salimath; Anand Selvan (Season 2)
- Country of origin: India
- Original language: Tamil
- No. of seasons: 2
- No. of episodes: 335

Production
- Producer: Nirosha Ramki
- Camera setup: Multi-camera
- Running time: 22 minutes
- Production company: Box Entertainment

Original release
- Network: Colors Tamil
- Release: 2 January 2020 – 7 March 2021

Related
- Choti Sarrdaarni

Uyire (transl. 'Life Itself') is a 2020 Indian Tamil-language soap opera airing on Colors Tamil from 2 January 2020 to 7 March 2021. The first season was success and remake but the second season received poor ratings, leading the show cancellation. The show stars Manishajith and Amruth Kalam. This series season 1 was the remake of the Hindi language television series Choti Sarrdaarni. The series is produced by Nirosha under the banner Box Entertainment.

== Plot ==
=== Season 1 (2020) ===
Carefree Pavithra falls in love with Varun who aspires to be an IAS officer. She becomes pregnant with his child. The area's MLA Veeralakshmi who is Pavithra's mother, learns her pregnancy with Varun's child and refuses to accept Varun as he is financially unstable. Veeralakshmi kills Varun with Pavithra's brothers and asks Pavithra to marry Sezhiyan who is a widower with a 5-year-old son, Naren and the president of the ruling party in that area. As Veeralakshmi aspires to be an MLA, this was only possible for her if Pavithra marries Sezhiyan. Pavithra disagrees at first but later accepts to save her unborn child from Veeralakshmi's ill intentions.

On the wedding night, she reveals to Sezhiyan about her pregnancy and begs him to let her go as she wants to settle far away and bring up her child. Sezhiyan gets angry but later promises that he would get her settled in a far away foreign country. But, in Goa Sezhiyan is accused of killing Pavithra and is arrested and is about to be punished. But in Goa, As he leaves, Pavithra gets kidnapped by goons. Pavithra sees the news on the T.V. She escaped from the goons and managed to reach the court and prove Sezhiyan innocent. He then accepts Pavithra's child as his own. Sezhiyan and Pavithra tell Naren about her pregnancy. Excited, Naren reveals this to Sezhiyan's sister Chandra. A grand party is organized celebrating Pavithra's pregnancy news. But Chandra finds Pavithra's medical report and learns the truth and tells Pavithra to abort child whereas, Sezhiyan takes care of Pavithra and the child like his own.

However, Pavithra gives birth to a girl named Yazhini and the baby goes missing. Sezhiyan and Pavithra manage to save the baby. But, They meet with an accident and presume to be as dead while baby is survived.

=== Season 2 (2020–2021) ===
20 years later, Yazhini has been adopted as Vennila and works as a maid, unaware about her past. She had a hope that she will find out her parents and reunite with them one day. She had no other proof of her parents rather than the number plate of the car which is said to be in Madurai which was told by the registration office. Chandra had two sons which has been revealed in this season. Chandra's first son, Aravind is the manager of the company. Vennila joins to the company for work. Later she was told to work in Chandra's house as maid. How Vennila will know about their parents and who killed them and how will she accept her enemy's son that is Chandra's son as her husband forms the crux of the story.

== Cast ==
=== Main ===
- Manishajith / Shreegopika Neelanath as Pavithra Chezhiyan: Veeralakshmi's daughter; Arun, Velmurugan and Balamurugan's sister; Chezhiyan's wife; Varun's ex-fiancée; Naren's step-mother; Yazhini's mother (2020)
- Veerendra Chowdhary / Amruth Kalam as Chezhiyan: Chandra's brother; Pavitra's husband; Malarvizhi's former husband; Naren's father; Yazhini's step-father (2020)
- Miguel Daniel as Naren Chezhiyan: Chezhiyan and Malarvizhi's son; Pavithra's step-son; Yazhini's step-brother (2020)
- Kushi Sampath Kumar / Aishwarya Salimath as Yazhini "Vennila" Chezhiyan Arvind: Pavithra and Varun's daughter; Chezhiyan's step-daughter; Aravind's wife (2020–2021)
- Anand Selvan as Aravind Sundarapandi: Chandra and Sundarapandi's son; Priyanka and Ashwin's brother; Vennila's husband (2020–2021)

=== Recurring ===
- Sona Nair / Seema G. Nair as Veeralakshmi: Pavithra, Arun, Velmurugan and Balamurugan's mother (2020)
- Sai Latha / Reshma Reshu as Chandra: Chezhiyan's elder sister; Sundarapandi's wife; Arvind, Priyanka and Ashwin's mother (2020)
- Sridhar Subramaniyam as Sundarapandi: Chandra's husband; Arvind, Priyanka and Ashwin's father (2020)
- Nirosha as Girija aka Dolly: Chezhiyan and Chandra's aunt (2020)
- Akila Krishnan as Eshwari: Sundarapandi's sister; Chandra's sister-in-law; Nandhini's mother (2020–2021)
- Ashika Varshika as Mallika: Vennlia's friend (2020–2021)
- Tharshika as Nandhini: Eshwari's daughter; Aravind's cousin (2020–2021)
- Dhakshana as Priyanka: Chandra and Sundarapandi's daughter; Aravind and Ashwin's sister (2020–2021)
- Surjith Kumar as Ashwin: Chandra and Sundarapandi's son; Aravind and Priyanka's brother (2020–2021)
- Sahana Sheddy as Samyuktha (2020–2021)
- M. J. Shriram as Samyuktha's father (2020–2021)
- Mercy Leyal as Samyuktha's mother (2020–2021)
- Feroz Khan as Arun Pandi: Pavithra's eldest brother; Krithika's husband; Rahul's father (2020)
- Yalini Rajan as Krithika: Arun's wife; Rahul's mother (2020)
- Saathvik / Abhinav Rengarajan as Rahul: Arun Pandi and Krithika's son (2020)
- Fawaz Zayani as Velmurugan: Pavithra's second brother (2020)
- Akshaya Dinesh as Yazhini: Velumurugan's wife (2020)
- Tamizh as Balamurugan: Pavithra's third brother (2020)
- Reshma Pasupuleti as DSP Vasundhara Devi (2020)
- Jeeva Ravi as Periyamaya Devar: Pavithra's father (special appearance) (2020)
- Pondy Ravi as Selladurai: Malarvizhi's father; Chezhiyan's former father-in-law (2020)
- Priya Tarun as Deivanayagi: Malarvizhi's mother; Chezhiyan's former mother-in-law (2020)
- Vinitha Jagannathan as Malarvizhi: Chezhiyan's former wife; Naren's mother (special appearance) (2020)
- Gaurav Gupta as Varun: Pavithra's ex-fiancé; Yazhini's father (2020)
