= Amman (TV series) =

- Genre: Supernatural; Drama
- Written by: Ulli K. Parthipan
- Directed by: Ravi Priyan (Episode 1-86); Parameswaran (Episode 86-1150)
- Starring: Pavithra Gowda; Amaljith; Nivisha; Nikitha murali Surjith Ansary
- Theme music composer: MR
- Country of origin: India
- Original language: Tamil
- No. of seasons: 3
- No. of episodes: 1150

Production
- Executive producer: J. Ahmedh
- Producer: J. Ahmedh
- Production location: Tamil Nadu
- Cinematography: Munish M. Eswaran
- Editors: Vimal Raj; Selva
- Camera setup: Multi-camera
- Running time: approx. 22–24 minutes per episode (2020/2021/2022) approx. 40–43 minutes per episode (2021)
- Production company: Meraki Films Works

Original release
- Network: Colors Tamil
- Release: 27 January 2020 – 1 July 2022

Amman is a 2020 Indian-Tamil language supernatural drama television series, starring Pavithra Gowda, Amaljith, Nivisha, Nikitha murali and Surjith Ansary. The show is produced by Meraki Films Works and directed by Ravi Priyan and Parameswaran. This show has Three Seasons. It premiered on 27 January 2020 and airs on Colors Tamil and digitally streams on Voot. The serial completed 1000 episodes on 1 January 2022. The series was ended with 1150 episodes on 1 July 2022.

== Seasons ==
Season	Episodes	Originally Broadcast	
Season	Episodes	First aired	Last aired
1	887	27 January 2020	23 October 2021
2	157	25 October 2021	19 February 2022
3	106	21 February 2022	1 July 2022

== Cast ==
=== Main ===
- Pavithra Gowda as Sakthi (Season 1–3)
  - a village belle who is blessed with the power of foreseeing future. She is revered by the village for her unique ability.
  - Eswar's wife, Sarada and Logambal's adoptive sister, Lakshmi and Devaraj's biological's daughter, Aravind, Apsara and Neha's cousin sister. (Main Protagonist)
- Amaljith as Eswar (Season 1–3)
  - a doctor by profession, who lives in the same village, tries to drive a wedge between Shakti and the villagers.
  - Sakthi's husband. (Main Protagonist)
- Nivisha as Durga: Kishore's wife, Azhaguraja's sister, Devendra Sethupathi and Rajeshwari's daughter, Kabilan's cousin sister. (Season 2)
- Surjith Ansary as Kishore: Durga's husband (Season 2)
- Nikitha murali as panchami

=== Supporting ===
Season 1

- Nanditha Jennifer as Saradha (Main Antagonist) (Season 1-2)
- Nisha Jagadeeswaran / Shaliy Avinesh as Logambal
  - Saradha's younger sister.
- Shobana Uthaman as Naga
- Anita Nair as Lakshmi
  - Devaraj's wife, Sakthi's mother.
- Tarun Master as Devaraj
  - Lakshmi's husband, Sakthi's father
- S. T. P. Rosary as Muthanna
- Rathan Ganapathy as Mahendran
  - Saraswathi's husband, Neha's father, Lakshmi's younger brother-in-law
- Kiruba as Saraswathi
  - Mahendran's wife, Lakshmi's younger sister, Neha's mother
- Avinash Ashok as Aravindh
  - Lakshmi's elder nephew, Apsara's brother
- Anu Sulash as Neha
  - Lakshmi's younger niece; Mahendran and Saraswathi's daughter.
- Shubha Raksha as Gandhari
- Alexander as Sangulingam
- Lavanya Manickam as Inba
  - Saradha's daughter.
- Jeeva
- Padmini as Bagyamma Sarada's housekeeper
- Bala Subramani
- Anu Viknesh as Naga
- Chandrika as Mandra
- Rathnaraj as Vettaiyan
- Aadhavan as doctor Vinoth
- Sai Lakshmi
- Rajani Praveen as Thara
- Shanthi Gowda as Rajali

Season 2

- Manikandan Raj as Devendra Sethupathy
  - A rich landlord
  - Deepa's husband, Azhaguraja and Durga's father
- Naresh Raj as Kabilan
  - He falls in love with Durga.
  - Maheshwari's son, Azhaguraja and Durga's cousin brother
- Deepa as Rajeswari
  - Lakshmi's mother and rich landlord wife.
- Sasindhar Pushpalingam as Mahendran Boopathy
  - Rajeshwari and Maheshwari's brother, Azhaguraja, Durga and Kabilan's uncle
- Raja Sekar as Aravan
- Anandhi Ajay as Yamini
- Alagappan as Azhaguraja
- Vetrivel as Mithran
- Eswari
- B.Nilani as Swarnadevi

==== Special appearances ====
- Vaigha as Vasuki
- Maheshwari Chanakyan as Sulakshana
- Samyuktha Shanmuganathan as Rudhra
- Manishajith as Thamini
- Rachitha Mahalakshmi as Amman

== Production ==
=== Casting ===
Actor Amaljith was cast in the male lead role as Eswar. Kannada TV actress Pavithra Gowda was cast in the female lead role as Sakthi. The series marks the Tamil television debut for Amaljith and Pavithra Gowda. Nanditha Jennifer was selected to play the role of Saradha, who is the main antagonist in the show. While Nisha Jagadeeswaran, Shaliy Avinesh, Anita Nair, Rathan Ganapathy, Chandrika, Alexander and Shubha Raksha were also selected for pivotal roles in first season.

The production and airing of the show were halted indefinitely since 21 March 2020, due to the COVID-19 pandemic in India on 28 May 2020 resumed again to telecast all new episodes.

Vaigha, Maheswari, Samyuktha Karthik, Manishajith and Rachitha Mahalakshmi were cast for guest roles in a few episodes.

While the second season was in pre-production, Amaljit and Pavithra Gowda, who played Easwar and Shakti in the first season, continued to star in the second series. Actress Nivisha was selected to play the role of Durga. Naresh Raj, He is making his debut on Tamil TV with this show.

== Crossover episodes ==
- Amman had crossover episodes with Maangalya Sandhosham from 15 March 2021 to 27 March 2021.
- For the second time Amman had crossover episodes with Maangalya Sandhosham from 10 May 2021 to 10 September 2021.
