= Jagan (actor) =

Indian actor

- Born: Jagan Purushottam; December 16, 1976 (age 49); Chennai
- Occupations: Actor, host
- Years active: 2005–present
- Spouse: Vaanmathi

Jagan (born December 16, 1976) is an Indian actor and comedian who has appeared in supporting roles in Tamil films. His breakthrough was with K. V. Anand's Ayan, where he played a small-time smuggler Chitti Babu, and the role won him critical acclaim.

He was the anchor of popular show Kadavul Paadhi Mirugam Paadhi, which was about reviewing movies, aired in Vijay TV. The show was pulled off air citing hard-hitting criticism. He is also a prominent TV and stage show host. He also hosts the game show Connexion on Vijay TV. He is married to his longtime girlfriend Vaanmathi.

== Filmography ==
=== Actor ===
Year	Film	Role	Notes
2005	Kanda Naal Mudhal	Krishna's friend	
2005	Ponniyin Selvan	Jaga	
2005	Chidambarathil Oru Appasamy		
2006	Vallavan	Vallavan's friend	Uncredited role
2007	Satham Podathey	Jagan	
2007	Oram Po	Supply	
2007	Pori	Himself	
2009	Ayan	Chitti Babu	
2010	Paiyaa	Poochi	
2010	Chikku Bukku	Sekhar's friend	
2010	Nil Gavani Sellathey	Milo	
2011	Ko	Chander	
2011	Doo	Kutty	
2012	Ambuli	Marudhan	
2013	Vatthikuchi	Vanaraj	
2013	Karuppampatti	Karuppu	
2013	Yaaruda Mahesh	Vasanth	
2013	Pattathu Yaanai	Ada Murugesan	
2013	Maryan	Sami	
2013	Endrendrum Punnagai	Jackson	
2014	Venmegam	Bhaskar	
2014	Vallinam	Jagan	
2014	Naan Sigappu Manithan	Satheesh	
2014	Sooran	Deivam	
2014	Pappali		
2014	Irumbu Kuthirai	Jagan	
2015	Iravum Pagalum Varum	Karthi's friend	
2015	Sagaptham	Maruthu	
2015	India Pakistan	Haridas/Pavadai	
2015	Anegan	Saamuda/Jagan	
2015	Aavi Kumar	Kumar's friend	
2015	Savaale Samaali	Billa	
2015	Thoonga Vanam	Jagan	
2015	Cheekati Rajyam	Jagan	Telugu film
2016	Uyire Uyire	Rahul's friend	
2016	Manal Kayiru 2		
2017	Kavan	Jagan	
2017	Bayama Irukku	Mani	
2017	Brahma.com	Jagan	
2018	Mr. Chandramouli	Partha	
2019	Enakku Innum Kalyanam Aagala	Madhavan	Lead role
2019	Jackpot	Rahul's friend	
2020	Asuraguru	Jagannathan	
2021	Thalli Pogathey	Karthik's friend	
2022	Rocketry: The Nambi Effect	Scientist	Also shot in Hindi and English
2022	Poikkal Kudhirai	Madhan	
2023	Pallu Padama Paathuka	Arumai Nayagam	
2023	Ghosty		
2023	Ithu Kathaiyalla Nijam		
2024	Idi Minnal Kadhal	Raja	
2024	Indian 2	Thambesh	
2024	Rocket Driver	Professor	

=== Director ===
- Aanandham Aarambham (2022) (Micro Web Series)

=== Television ===
Year	Title	Role(s)	TV Channel	Notes
2007	King Queen Jack	Host	Vijay TV	Stand-up comedy show
2008	Kadavul Paadhi Mirugam Paadhi	Film reviewer (Jagan in a triple role as Nandu, Vandu, Jendu)	Vijay TV	
2008	Reel Paadhi Real Paadhi	Film reviewer (Jagan in a triple role as Nandu, Vandu, Jendu)	Vijay TV	
2013-2017	Connexion	Host	Vijay TV	
2017	Namma Ooru Connexion	Host	Vijay TV	
2017	Stunt Union's 50th year Golden Jubliee Celebrations	Host	Sun TV	
2019	Inga Enna Solluthu	Host	Kalaignar TV	
2021	Rowdy Baby	Contestant	Sun TV	He participated with his wife, Vaanmathi.
2022	Run Baby Run	Host	Zee Tamil	
2022	Sarkaar	Contestant	Colors Tamil & Aha	
