= Sridhar (choreographer) =

Indian choreographer

- Born: Chennai, India
- Other name: Dance Master
- Occupations: choreographer, reality television judge, actor, Director
- Years active: 2001–present

Sridhar is an Indian dance choreographer who has worked in India's regional films. He has also appeared as an actor, making his debut with Poi (2006) and with cameo appearances in songs he has choreographed.

== Career ==
Sridhar made his full acting debut in K. Balachander's Poi (2006), appearing in a supporting role. He worked as the choreographer for the "Naaka Mukka" song in Kadhalil Vizhunthen (2008), and was given the responsibility of ensuring the hit song translated well on-screen. Behindwoods.com consequently noted Sridhar "gave it some rocking steps and he more than delivered", listing it as a "signature dance step". Sridhar won further critical acclaim for his work as a choreographer in Prabhu Deva's Engeyum Kadhal (2011), where he collaborated with his mentor for four songs. He also choreographed and appeared in the title song of television series Nadhaswaram.

In 2015, he made his first appearance as a leading actor by appearing the action drama, Pokkiri Mannan directed by Raghav Madhesh. The film released with little publicity and received negative reviews from critics.

In 2018, he became a director for the movie Saavadi.

== Personal life ==
Sridhar is married to Anuradha, and they have a daughter.

== Filmography ==
- All films are in Tamil, unless otherwise noted.

=== Choreographer ===
Films

Year	Film	Notes
2002	Ezhumalai	
2002	Raja	
2002	University	
2003	Alaudin	
2003	Soori	
2004	Varnajalam	
2004	4 Students	
2004	Arasatchi	
2004	Kaadhal	
2005	Manthiran	
2006	Kodambakkam	
2006	Azhagai Irukkirai Bayamai Irukkirathu	
2006	Poi	
2007	Pokkiri	
2007	Marudhamalai	
2007	Vegam	
2008	Muniyandi Vilangial Moonramandu	
2008	Kadhalil Vizhunthen	
2008	Pachai Nirame	
2008	Dindigul Sarathy	
2009	Villu	
2010	Ambasamudram Ambani	
2011	Engeyum Kadhal	
2011	Puli Vesham	
2011	Vedi	
2011	Vithagan	
2012	Eppadi Manasukkul Vanthai	
2012	Thuppakki	
2012	Chandhamama	
2012	Thalaivaa	
2012	Ragalaipuram	
2014	Jilla	
2015	Pokkiri Mannan	
2015	Puli	
2015	10 Endrathukulla	
2015	Pravegaya	Sinhala film
2016	Theri	
2016	24	
2017	Bogan	
2018	Goli Soda 2	
2018	Bhaskar Oru Rascal	
2018	Junga	
2018	Charlie Chaplin 2	
2018	Sarkar	
2022	My Dear Bootham	

=== Television ===
Year	Film	Language
2000	Manikoondu	Tamil
2010	Nadhaswaram	Tamil
2022	Vellum Thiramai	Tamil
2022	Pottikku Potti – R U Ready	Tamil

=== Director ===
Year	Film	Notes
2018	Saavadi	

=== Actor ===
Films

Year	Film	Role	Notes
2000	Doubles	Prabhu's friend	
2002	University	Sridhar	
2006	Poi	Roshan	
2015	Pokkiri Mannan	Marudhu	
2022	Aadhaar	Auto driver	
2023	Bell	Bell	
2023	Japan	Himself	Cameo appearance
2024	Operation Laila	Ganeshan	
2024	Petta Rap	Himself	Cameo appearance

Television

Year	Film	Role	Language
2005	Raja Rajeswari	special appearance in the title song "Sakalakala Valliye"	Tamil
2010	Nadhaswaram	special appearance in the title song "Nadhaswaram"	Tamil
2025	Naanga Ready Neenga Ready Ah Season 2	Judge	Tamil

=== Dancer ===
Year	Film	Song	Notes
1995	Coolie	"Ye Rammu"	
1997	Arunachalam	"Mathadu Mathadu"	
1997	Dhinamum Ennai Gavani	"Pathikichiyamma Pambara Vayasu"	
1997	Ratchagan	"Soniya Soniya"	
1999	Ustaad	"Chik Chik Chilamboli Thaalam"	Malayalam films
1999	Pattabhishekam	"Shankhumvenchamaram"	Malayalam films
1999	O Premave	"Yaravva Ivalu"	Kannada film
2000	Thai Poranthachu	"Gopala Gopala"	
2000	Kushi	"Macarena"	
2000	Pennin Manathai Thottu	"Kalloori Vaanil"	
2000	Parthen Rasithen	"Pudikkala"	
2000	Rhythm	"Thaniye"	
2001	Minnale	"Azhagiya Theeye"	
2001	Praja	"Chandanamani"	Malayalam film
2001	Vedham	"Hey Meenalochani"	
2001	Samudhiram	"Pineapple Vannathodu"	
2001	12B	"Sariya Thavara"	
2001	Shahjahan	"Kadhal Oru"	
2001	Majunu	"Mercury Mele"	
2002	Red	"Kannai Kasakkum"	
2002	Thamizhan	"Hot Party"	
2002	123	"Kanchivaram Povom"	
2002	Youth	"Old Model Laila"	
2003	Kadhal Sadugudu	"Sugandhi Sellai"	
2003	Soori	"Pirivellam"	
2004	Varnajalam	"Matha Matha"	
2004	Udhaya	"Pookkum Malarai"	
2004	Madurey	"Machan Peru"	
2004	Kaadhal	"Pura Koondu"	
2005	December	"Dum Duma"	Malayalam film
2006	Kodambakkam	"Oh Pappa"	
2007	Vegam	Unknown	
2007	Puli Varudhu	"Theru Varudhu"	
2008	Kadhalil Vizhunthen	"Nakka Mukka"	
2009	Chamkaisi Chindi Udaysi	"Colour Colour Duniya"	Kannada film
2010	Ambasamudram Ambani	"Poo Pookkum Tharunam"	
2011	Puli Vesham	"Top Class"	
2013	Thalaivaa	"Tamil Pasanga"	
2013	Chandhamama	"Narayana Narayana"	
2013	Ragalaipuram	"Obamavum"	
2014	Jilla	"Yeppa Maama Treatu"	
2014	Uyirukku Uyiraga	"Jhoom Le"	
2015	10 Endrathukulla	"Vroom Vroom"	
2016	Natpadhigaram 79	"Chellamma"	
2017	Gowdru Hotel	"Kshanvu"	Kannada film
2017	Sakka Podu Podu Raja	"Kalakku Machaan"	
2018	Goli Soda 2	"Pondattee"	
2018	Junga	"Amma Mela Sathiyam"	
2024	Operation Laila	"Sillatta Siricha"	
2025	Padaiyaanda Maaveeraa	"Ava Varuvaalaa"	
2026	99/66	Unknown	
2026	Vengeance	"Thannila Kandam"	
