= Idhu Solla Marandha Kadhai =

- Genre: Family; Drama
- Created by: Colors Tamil
- Written by: Dialogue; M.R Pon Ilango
- Screenplay by: I. Ashokan
- Directed by: S.Anand Vabu N.V.Natarajan
- Creative director: C. Jayachandran
- Starring: Rachitha Mahalakshmi; Vishnu; Sridevi Ashok; Deepa Shankar
- Country of origin: India
- Original language: Tamil
- No. of episodes: 147

Production
- Executive producer: G. Selvin Kasperov (Colors Tamil)
- Producer: N.S Rangkaraj
- Cinematography: PK
- Editor: L. Justin Antony Rai
- Camera setup: Multi camera
- Running time: approx.20-22 minutes per episode
- Production company: 49 Frames

Original release
- Network: Colors Tamil
- Release: 7 March – 23 September 2022

Idhu Solla Marandha Kadhai (transl. It's a Forgotten story to tell) is an Indian-Tamil-language Family drama television series, that aired on Colors Tamil and digital platform Voot, which premiered on 7 March 2022 and ended on 23 September 2022 with 147 episodes. It starred Rachitha Mahalakshmi and Vishnu. It is the remake of Colors TV's Na Bole Tum Na Maine Kuch Kaha.

== Cast ==
=== Main ===
- Rachitha Mahalakshmi as Sadhana Shankar – Sundar's sister; Shankar's widow; Akshara and Adithya's mother
- Vishnu as Arjun – News reporter at Tamil news company; Lechchami's son; Yamuna and Keerthana's brother; Akshara's friend

=== Recurring ===
- Arshita as Akshara "Akshu" Shankar – Sadhana and Shankar's daughter; Adithya's sister; Arjun's friend
- Satvik Dev as Adithya "Adi" Shankar – Sadhana and Shankar's son; Akshara's brother
- Gowthami Vembunathan as Saraswathi Rajasekar – Rajasekar's wife; Saravanan, Shankar and Radha's mother; Abhinaya, Sarath, Akshara and Adithya's grandmother
- Vincent Roy as Rajasekar – Chandrakala's brother; Saraswathi's husband; Saravanan, Shankar and Radha's father; Abhinaya, Sarath, Akshara and Adithya's grandfather
- Deepa Shankar as Chandrakala – Rajasekar's sister; Saravanan, Shankar and Radha's aunt; Sadhana's mother-figure; Abhinaya, Sarath, Akshara and Adithya's grandaunt
- Prakash Rajan as Saravanan Rajasekar – Rajasekar and Saraswathi's elder son; Shankar and Radha's brother; Chithra's husband; Sarath's father
- Sridevi Ashok as Chithra Saravanan – Saravanan's wife; Sarath's mother
- John Marshall as Sarath Saravanan – Saravanan and Chithra's son
- Vidhyamini Subhash as Radha Rajasekar Sundar – Rajasekar and Saraswathi's daughter; Saravanan and Shankar's sister; Sundar's wife; Abhinaya's mother
- Gemini Mani as Sundar – Sadhana's brother; Radha's husband; Abhinaya's father
- Sudhapushpa as Sundar and Sadhana's mother
- Sarath as Raju – Arjun's best friend
- Agalya Saro as Lechchami – Yamuna, Arjun and Keerthana's mother
- Preetha Reddy as Keerthana – Lechchami's younger daughter; Yamuna and Arjun's sister
- Subadhini Subramanian as Yamuna Manokar – Lechchami's elder daughter; Arjun and Keerthana's sister; Manokar's wife
- Raj Kumar Manoharan as Manokar – Yamuna's husband
- Ravi Chandran as Lechchami's husband; Yamuna, Arjun and Keerthana's father

=== Special appearance ===
- Ajai Bharat as Shankar Rajasekar – Rajasekar and Saraswathi's younger son; Saravanan and Radha's brother; Sadhana's late husband; Akshara and Adithya's father (Dead)

== Production ==
=== Casting ===
Actress Rachitha Mahalakshmi was selected to play the character Sadhana which Aakanksha Singh played in the Original . Vishnu was selected to play Arjun's character. Where Sridevi Ashok, Deepa Shankar, Vincent, Gowthami in pivotal roles.

=== Release ===
The first promo was unveiled on 7 February 2022, featuring protagonist and revealing the release date. The second promo was unveiled on 12 February 2022 and The third promo was unveiled on 25 February 2022

== Adaptations ==
Language	Title	Original release	Networks(s)	Last aired	Notes
Hindi	Na Bole Tum Na Maine Kuch Kaha न बोले तुम न मैंने कुछ कहा	9 January 2012	Colors TV	12 September 2013	Original
Tamil	Idhu Solla Marandha Kadhai இது சொல்ல மறந்த கதை	7 March 2022	Colors Tamil	23 September 2022	Remake
