= Meera (2022 TV series) =

Indian Tamil-language TV series

- Original title: மீரா
- Genre: Family; Drama
- Written by: Kushboo Sundar
- Directed by: A. Jawahar
- Country of origin: India
- Original language: Tamil
- No. of episodes: 87

Production
- Producer: Kushboo Sundar
- Editor: Sutheef.S
- Camera setup: Single-camera
- Running time: approx.20-22 minutes per episode
- Production company: Avni Telemedia

Original release
- Network: Colors Tamil
- Release: 28 March – 22 July 2022

Related
- Itna Karo Na Mujhe Pyaar

Meera - Oru Puthu Kavithai (transl. Meera - A new poem) is a 2022 Indian-Tamil language family drama television series, starring Kushboo Sundar and Suresh. The show is produced by Avni Telemedia and written by veteran actress Kushboo Sundar. It premiered on Colors Tamil on 28 March 2022, and ended on 22 July 2022 which aired from Monday to Friday at 21:30 and available for streaming in selected markets on Voot. The show is loosely based on Hindi soap opera Itna Karo Na Mujhe Pyaar.

== Cast ==
=== Main ===
- Kushboo Sundar as Dr. Meera Krishna: Dr. Krishna's wife; Adhira and Ajay's mother. Janaki's daughter. She is a self independent gynecologist who works under Dr. Kannan in his hospital.
- Suresh Chandra Menon / Suresh as Dr. Krishna: Dr. Meera's husband; Adhira and Ajay's father. Adhithi's foster father. A very famous and expertised thoracic surgeon.

=== Supporting ===
- Pooja Lokesh as Anjali: Adithi’s aunt
- Isvar Raghunathan as Balaji: Jyothi’s husband
- Arvind Kathare as Chezhiyan
- Akshaya Kandamuthan as Adhira: Meera and Krishna’s daughter; Ajay’s sister
- Shanthi Williams as Janaki: Meera’s mother
- Anusai (Elakiya Jayakumar) as Dr. Arundathi Dr. Kannan’s wife
- Sai Krishna as Ajay: Meera and Krishna’s son; Adhira’s brother
- Shalini as Jyothi: Krishna's sister
- Richie as Charan: Adhira's collegemate
- Rohit Ved as Dr. Kannan: Meera's best friend
- Sumithra Sharma as Adithi: Anjali’s niece
- Revathy Sankar as Lakshmi: Kannan’s mother

== Production ==
=== Development ===
On January end 2022, Colors Tamil confirmed through a press release that it would distribute new Tamil serial, to be produced by Kushboo Sundar under Avni Telemedia and also debuts as a screenplay writer by Kushboo Sundar.

=== Release ===
The first promo was unveiled on 5 February 2022, featuring protagonist khusboo face and hand-print, The second promo was unveiled on 9 February 2022, featuring protagonist Kushboo Sundar and Suresh Chandra Menon and revealing the release date.
