= Abhi Tailor =

- Genre: Drama
- Directed by: Suresh Shanmugam
- Starring: Reshma Muralidharan; Madhan Pandian
- Theme music composer: Jay Kumarvaasan
- Country of origin: India
- Original language: Tamil
- No. of seasons: 1
- No. of episodes: 398

Production
- Executive producer: G. Selvin Kasperov (Colors Tamil)
- Cinematography: N. Daniel Thinesh
- Editor: Umesh Kumar
- Camera setup: Multi-camera
- Running time: 22 minutes
- Production company: Media Mogul

Original release
- Network: Colors Tamil
- Release: 19 July 2021 – 19 August 2022

Abhi Tailor is an Indian Tamil-language drama television series, starring Reshma Muralidharan and Madhan Pandian. The show is produced by Media Mogul and directed by Suresh Shanmugam. It aired on Colors Tamil from 19 July 2021, to 19 August 2022, every Monday to Saturday for 398 episodes. It is also available for streaming on Voot.

== Cast ==
=== Main ===
- Reshma Muralidharan as Abhirami
- Madhan Pandian as Ashok

=== Recurring ===
- Reshma Pasupuleti as Anamika: Ashok's elder sister
- Sona Heiden as Neelambari: Ashok's mother
- Siddharth Kapilavayi as Jaganathan: Ashok's elder brother-in-law
- Srinivasan → Sathish as Chakravarthy: Ashok's father
- Jayashri Chaki as Anandhi: Abhirami's younger sister
- Sanjay Raja as Aravind: Abhirami's younger brother
- Badava Gopi as Sundaramoorthy: Abhirami's father
- Vishnu → Santhosh as Atharva: Ashok's younger brother
- Dharani Reddy → Suja Vasan → Chandini Prakash as Vaisali: Ashok's maternal cousin; Viswanathan's daughter
- Kevin as Indrajith: Ashok's maternal cousin; Viswanathan's son
- Mythili Sathyajith → Rekha Angelina as Indira: Ashok's maternal aunt
- Vetri Kiran Kumar → Prakash Rajan as Viswanathan: Ashok's maternal uncle; Neelambari's younger brother
- Anitha Venkat as Subbulakshmi
- Nivy Nivetha as Subathra: Ashok's secretary
- Mani KL → Adaavadi Ansar as Ganesha
- VJ Tara as Dhanalakshmi
- Subhageetha as Deivanai
- Vishnukanth → Sudharsanam as Raghu: Abhi's friend
- C. Ranganathan as VKR: Raghu's father
- Gemini Mani as Manickam
- KPY Adhi as Narayanan

=== Guest ===
- Bharath Niwas
