= Colors Tamil =

Indian television channel

- Logo used since 2018
- Country: India
- Broadcast area: Worldwide
- Headquarters: Chennai, Tamil Nadu, India

Programming
- Language: Tamil
- Picture format: 1080p HDTV

Ownership
- Owner: JioStar
- Sister channels: Star Vijay; Star Vijay Super; Star Vijay Takkar

History
- Launched: 19 February 2018; 8 years ago

Links
- Website: www.colorstamil.in www.youtube.com/@colorstamil

Availability

Terrestrial
- (Malaysia) Astro: Channel 222 (HD)
- (Malaysia) NJOI: Channel 222 (HD)
- (Singapore) StarHub TV: Channel 132 (HD)

Streaming media
- JioHotstar: India
- YouTube: India
- (Malaysia) Astro: Astro GO

Colors Tamil is an Indian Tamil language general entertainment pay television channel owned by JioStar, a joint venture between Viacom18 and Disney India on 19 February 2018. The channel's headquarters is in Chennai, Tamil Nadu. It primarily telecasts programs such as serials, reality shows and Tamil films.

== History ==
On 19 February 2018, Colors Tamil's SD feed was rebranded from NXT, while the HD feed was previously known as ZAP. The channel partnership with Columbia Pictures for Hollywood movies.
