= 2018 in Tamil television =

The following is a list of events affecting Tamil language television in 2018 from India, Sri Lanka, Singapore and the Tamil diaspora. Events listed include television show debuts and finales; channel launches and closures; stations changing or adding their network affiliations; and information about changes of ownership of channels or stations.

== Event ==
=== January/தை ===
| Date | Events | Source |
|---|---|---|
| 13 | Vikatan Cinema Awards 2017 live telecast was aired on Vikatan Facebook. | |
| 13 | Natchathira Vizha 2018 Part 1 and Part 2 were broadcast on Sun TV. The Nadigar Sangam, the event was being a heady concoction of skits, dance performances, songs and matches as well. NatchathiraVizha on 6 January 2018, loaded with 250 artists from the Tamil film industry. It also included live performances, comedy skits, cricket and football matches. | |
| 14 | Natchathira Vizha 2018 Part 1 and Part 2 were broadcast on Sun TV. The Nadigar Sangam, the event was being a heady concoction of skits, dance performances, songs and matches as well. NatchathiraVizha on 6 January 2018, loaded with 250 artists from the Tamil film industry. It also included live performances, comedy skits, cricket and football matches. | |
| 26 | Natchathira Vizha 2018 Part 1 and Part 2 were broadcast on Sun TV. The Nadigar Sangam, the event was being a heady concoction of skits, dance performances, songs and matches as well. NatchathiraVizha on 6 January 2018, loaded with 250 artists from the Tamil film industry. It also included live performances, comedy skits, cricket and football matches. | |

=== February/மாசி ===
| Date | Events | Source |
|---|---|---|
| 9 | Viacom18 network launch of Colors Tamil channel | |

== Special premiere movies ==
=== January ===
| First aired | Events | Premiere movies | Time | Channel | Source |
|---|---|---|---|---|---|
| 1 January | New Year ஆங்கில புத்தாண்டு | Rangoon | 10:00 am (IST) | Vijay TV | |
| 1 January | New Year ஆங்கில புத்தாண்டு | Magalir Mattum | 3:30 pm (IST) | Zee Tamil | |
| 1 January | New Year ஆங்கில புத்தாண்டு | Singam 3 | 6:30 pm (IST) | Sun TV | |
| 14 January | Thai Pongal தை பொங்கல் | Kaashmora | 10:30 am (IST) | Jaya TV | |
| 14 January | Thai Pongal தை பொங்கல் | Gemini Ganeshanum Suruli Raajanum | 10:30 am (IST) | Kalaignar TV | |
| 14 January | Thai Pongal தை பொங்கல் | Aramm | 11:00 am (IST) | Sun TV | |
| 14 January | Thai Pongal தை பொங்கல் | Maragadha Naanayam | 11:00 am (IST) | Zee Tamil | |
| 14 January | Thai Pongal தை பொங்கல் | Theeran Adhigaaram Ondru | 11:00 am (IST) | Vijay TV | |
| 14 January | Thai Pongal தை பொங்கல் | Bairavaa | 3:00 pm (IST) | Sun TV | |
| 14 January | Thai Pongal தை பொங்கல் | Mersal | 4:00 pm (IST) | Zee Tamil | |
| 14 January | Thai Pongal தை பொங்கல் | Pulimurugan | 5:30 pm (IST) | Vijay TV | |
| 14 January | Thai Pongal தை பொங்கல் | I | 6:30 pm (IST) | Jaya TV | |
| 15 January | Mattu Pongal மாட்டு பொங்கல் | Katha Nayagan | 10:00 am (IST) | Vijay TV | |
| 15 January | Mattu Pongal மாட்டு பொங்கல் | Thodari | 10:30 am (IST) | Jaya TV | |
| 15 January | Mattu Pongal மாட்டு பொங்கல் | Karuppan | 11:00 am (IST) | Sun TV | |
| 15 January | Mattu Pongal மாட்டு பொங்கல் | Shivalinga | 11:00 am (IST) | Zee Tamil | |
| 15 January | Mattu Pongal மாட்டு பொங்கல் | Vanamagan | 4:00 pm (IST) | Zee Tamil | |
| 15 January | Mattu Pongal மாட்டு பொங்கல் | Kabali | 6:30 pm (IST) | Sun TV | |

== Television programs ==
| First aired | Title | Time | Channel | Notes | Source |
|---|---|---|---|---|---|
| 8 January | Shiridi Sai Baba சிரடி சாய் பாபா | Monday to Saturday at 10:00 am (IST) | Sun TV | Dubbed soap opera | |
| 11 January | Hello Hello Sugama 2 ஹலோ ஹலோ சுகமா 2 | Thursday at 9:00 pm (SST) | Mediacorp Vasantham | Info-Ed | |
| 16 January | Tenali Raman தென்னாலி ராமன் | Monday to Friday at 6:00 pm (IST) | Zee Tamil | Dubbed soap opera | |
| 20 January | Super Singer 6 சூப்பர் சிங்கர் சீசன் 6 | Saturday – Sunday at 7:00 pm (IST) | Vijay TV | Singing show | |
| 23 January | Azhagiya Theevey அழகிய தீவே | Tuesday; 9:00 pm (SST) | Mediacorp Vasantham | Travel show | |
| 25 January | Naadam நாதம் | Thursday; 7:30 pm (SST) | Mediacorp Vasantham | Music Travel show | |
| 28 January | Vaname Ellai வானமே எல்லை | Sunday at 8:00 pm (IST) | Jaya TV | Talk show | |
| 28 January | Jil Jung Juk ஜில் ஜங் ஜக் | Sunday at 9:00 pm (IST) | Jaya TV | game show | |
| 29 January | Kalyanamam Kalyanam கல்யாணமாம் கல்யாணம் | Monday to Friday at 1:00 pm (IST) | Vijay TV | soap opera | |
| 3 February | Mahakali மகாகாளி | Saturday and Sunday at 7:00 pm (SST) | Shakthi TV | Dubbed soap opera | |
| 4 February | Comedy Khiladis காமெடி கில்லாடிஸ் | Sunday at 2:00 pm (IST) | Zee Tamil | Comedy show | |
| 12 February | Mahaveer Hanuman மஹாவீர் ஹனுமான் | Monday to Friday at 7:00 pm (IST) | Polimer TV | Dubbed soap opera | |
| 18 February | Star Wars Season 2 ஸ்டார் வார்ஸ் 2 | Sunday at 12:00 pm (IST) | Sun TV | Stunt/dare | |
| 19 February | Nayaki நாயகி | Monday to Saturday at 8:00 pm (IST) | Sun TV | soap opera | |
| 19 February | Thillu Mullu தில்லு முள்ளு | Monday to Friday at 8:30 pm (IST) | Polimer TV | Dubbed soap opera | |
| 19 February | Savaal சவால் | Monday to Friday at 9:00 pm (IST) | Polimer TV | Dubbed soap opera | |
| 20 February | Velunachi வேலுநாச்சி | Monday to Friday at 6:30 pm (IST) | Colors Tamil | soap opera | |
| 20 February | Naagini 2 நாகினி 2 | Monday to Friday at 7:00 pm (IST) | Colors Tamil | Dubbed soap opera | |
| 20 February | Sivagami சிவகாமி | Monday to Friday at 8:00 pm (IST) | Colors Tamil | soap opera | |
| 20 February | Enga Veetu Mapillai எங்க வீட்டு மாப்பிள்ளை | Monday to Friday at 8:30 pm (IST) | Colors Tamil | marriage reality show | |
| 20 February | Perazhagi பேரழகி | Monday to Friday at 9:30 pm (IST) | Colors Tamil | soap opera | |
| 24 February | Kaakkum Deivam Kali காக்கும் தெய்வம் காளி | Saturday and Sunday at 7:30 pm (IST) | Colors Tamil | Dubbed soap opera | |
| 24 February | Colors Super Kids கலர்ஸ் சூப்பர் கிட்ஸ் | Saturday and Sunday at 8:30 pm (IST) | Colors Tamil | Kids show | |
| 26 February | Avalum Naanum அவளும் நானும் | Monday to Friday at 1:30 pm (IST) | Vijay TV | soap opera | |
| 26 February | Ponmagal Vanthal பொன்மகள் வந்தாள் | Monday to Friday at 2:00 pm (IST) | Vijay TV | soap opera | |
| 17 March | Villa To Village வில்லா டு வில்லேஜ் | Saturday and Sunday at 9:30 pm (IST) | Vijay TV | Reality | |
| 26 March | Naam Iruvar Namakku Iruvar நாம் இருவர் நமக்கு இருவர் | Monday to Friday at 6:30 pm (IST) | Vijay TV | soap opera | |
| 2 April | Bimbangal பிம்பங்கள் | Monday to Thursday at 10:00 pm (SST) | MediaCorp Vasantham | soap opera | |
| 2 April | Yaar? (season 2) யார்? 2 | Monday to Thursday at 10:30 pm (SST) | MediaCorp Vasantham | soap opera | |
| 4 April | Udayam (season 2) உதயம் 2 | Wednesday at 9:30 pm (SST) | MediaCorp Vasantham | reality show | |
| 5 April | Achamillai Achamillai அச்சமில்லை அச்சமில்லை | Thursday at 9:30 pm (SST) | MediaCorp Vasantham | Talk show | |
| 9 April | Roja ரோஜா | Monday to Saturday at 3:00 pm (IST) | Sun TV | soap opera | |
| 15 April | Panthayam பந்தயம் | Sunday at 11:00 am (IST) | Puthuyugam TV | Reality, Game show | |
| 15 April | Wife Kaila Life மனைவி கையிலை வாழ்க்கை | Sunday at 8:30 pm (IST) | Vijay TV | Reality | |
| 16 April | Kalyana Veedu கல்யாண வீடு | Monday to Saturday at 7:30 pm (IST) | Sun TV | soap opera | |
| 18 April | Oru Kadhai Padattuma Sir ஒரு கதை படட்டுமா சார்? | Monday to Friday at 8:30 pm (IST) | Colors Tamil | soap opera | |
| 18 April | Vanthal Sridevi வந்தாள் ஸ்ரீதேவி | Monday to Friday at 9:00 pm (IST) | Colors Tamil | soap opera | |
| 21 April | Enkitta Mothathe என்கிட்ட மோததே | Saturday at 8:30 pm (IST) | Vijay TV | Reality | |
| 23 April | Oru Oorla Oru Rajakumari ஒரு ஊர்ல ஒரு ராஜகுமாரி | Monday to Friday at 9:30 pm (IST) | Zee Tamil | soap opera | |
| 5 May | Sa Re Ga Ma Pa Lil' Champs 2 | Saturday and Sunday at 6:30 pm (IST) | Zee Tamil | Singing show | |
| 28 May | Kadal Kadandhu Udhyogam கடல் கடந்து உத்யோகம் | Monday to Thursday at 7:00 pm (IST) | Raj TV | soap opera | |
| 28 May | Gangadharanai Kanom கங்காதரனை காணோம் | Monday to Thursday at 7:30 pm (IST) | Raj TV | soap opera | |
| 28 May | Kannamma கண்ணம்மா | Monday to Thursday at 8:01 pm (IST) | Raj TV | soap opera | |
| 28 May | Hello Shyamala ஹாலோ சியாமளா | Monday to Thursday at 8:30 pm (IST) | Raj TV | soap opera | |
| 28 May | Nalam Nalam Ariya Aval நலம் நலம் அறிய ஆவல் | Monday to Thursday at 9:00 pm (IST) | Raj TV | soap opera | |
| 6 June | Sangadam Theerkum Saneeswaran சங்கடம் தீர்க்கும் சனீஸ்வரன் | Monday to Saturday at 7:00 pm (IST) | Colors Tamil | Dubbed soap opera | |
| 17 June | Bigg Boss Tamil 2 பிக் பாஸ் தமிழ் 2 | Monday to Sunday at 2:30 pm (IST) | Vijay TV | Reality | |
| 18 June | Naagini 3 நாகினி 3 | Monday to Friday at 8:30 pm (IST) | Colors Tamil | Dubbed soap opera | |
| 23 June | Mr & Mrs Khiladis 2 திரு & திருமதி கில்லாடிஸ் 2 | Saturday and Sunday at 9:30 pm (IST) | Zee Tamil | stunt/dare reality | |
| 25 June | Guru Paarvai S4 குருபார்வை பகுதி 4 | Monday to Thursday at 10:00 pm (SST) | MediaCorp Vasantham | soap opera | |
| 25 June | Snehithane சிநேகிதனே | Monday to Thursday at 10:30 pm (SST) | MediaCorp Vasantham | soap opera | |
| 27 June | Genes (season 3) ஜீன்ஸ்-3 | Sunday at 2:30 pm (IST) | Zee Tamil | Reality | |
| 6 July | My Dear Kudumbam Returns மை டியர் குடும்பம் | Friday at 8:00 pm (SST) | MediaCorp Vasantham | soap opera | |
| 9 July | Bhama Rukmani பாமா ருக்மணி | Monday to Saturday at 11:00 am (IST) | Sun TV | Dubbed soap opera | |
| 9 July | Eeramana Rojave ஈரமான ரோஜாவே | Monday to Saturday at 2:30 pm (IST) | Vijay TV | soap opera | |
| 9 July | Maya மாயா | Monday to Saturday at 7:00 pm (IST) | Sun TV | soap opera | |
| 21 July | Divided டிவைடெட் | Saturday and Sunday at 8:00 pm (IST) | Vijay TV | Reality | |
| 22 July | Sagalai vs Ragalai சகலை விஸ் ரகளை | Sunday at 8:00 pm (IST) | Vijay TV | Reality | |
| 23 July | Kallachirippu கள்ளச்சிரிப்பு | | Zee5 | web series | |
| 28 July | Kings Of Comedy Juniors S2 கிங்ஸ் ஒப் காமெடி ஜூனியர்ஸ் 2 | Saturday and Sunday at 7:00 pm (IST) | Vijay TV | Reality | |
| 28 July | Illaya Thalapathy இளைய தளபதி | Saturday and Sunday at 8:00 pm (IST) | Colors Tamil | Dubbed soap opera | |
| 29 July | Natchathira Jannal 3 நட்சத்திர ஜன்னல் 3 | Sunday at 11:00 am (IST) | Puthuyugam TV | Talk show | |
| 30 July | Marubadiyum மறுபடியும் | Monday to Friday at 10:30 pm (IST) | Colors Tamil | Dubbed soap opera | |
| 6 August | Minnale மின்னலே | Monday to Saturday at 1:30 pm (IST) | Sun TV | soap opera | |
| 6 August | Nimirnthu Nil நிமிர்ந்து நில் | Monday to Friday at 10:00 pm (IST) | Polimer TV | Dubbed soap opera | |
| 20 August | Ponnukku Thanga Manasu பொண்ணுக்கு தங்க மனசு | Monday to Friday at 8:00 pm (IST) | Vijay TV | soap opera | |

=== Returning this year ===
| Return date | Show | Last aired | Previous channel | New/returning/same channel | Notes |
|---|---|---|---|---|---|
| 6 January | Vinayagar விநாயகர் | on airing | Sun TV | Shakthi TV | Dubbed |
| 22 January | Priyamanaval பிரியமானவள் | on airing | Sun TV | same | soap opera |
| 1 February | Naagini நாகினி | 27 June 2016 – 21 January 2017 | Sun TV | Colors Tamil | Dubbed |
| 17 June | Bigg Boss Tamil 2 பிக் பாஸ் தமிழ் 2 | 17 June 2018–present | Star Vijay | same | |

=== Milestone episodes ===
| Episode airdate | Show | Channel | Episode | Notes | Source |
|---|---|---|---|---|---|
| 11 January | Nandini நந்தினி | Sun TV | 300th | soap opera | |
| 29 January | Mouna Ragam மௌன ராகம் | Vijay TV | 200th | soap opera | |
| 30 January | Azhagiya Tamil Magal அழகிய தமிழ் மகள் | Zee Tamil | 100th | soap opera | |
| 30 January | Poove Poochudava பூவே பூச்சூடவா | Zee Tamil | 200th | soap opera | |
| 30 January | Yaaradi Nee Mohini யாரடி நீ மோகினி | Zee Tamil | 200th | soap opera | |
| 1 February | Chandralekha சந்திரலேகா | Sun TV | 1000th | soap opera | |
| 6 February | Marmakkuzhal மர்மக்குழல் | IBC Tamil | 100th | soap opera | |
| 19 February | Chinna Thambi சின்னதம்பி | Vijay TV | 100th | soap opera | |
| 21 February | Anjarai Petti 2 அஞ்சறை பெட்டி 2 | Zee Tamil | 500th | Cooking show | |
| 23 February | Vani Rani வாணி ராணி | Sun TV | 1500th | soap opera | |
| 26 February | Nenjam Marappathillai நெஞ்சம் மறப்பதில்லை | Vijay TV | 100th | soap opera | |
| 1 March | Devathaiyai Kanden தேவதையை கண்டேன் | Zee Tamil | 100th | soap opera | |
| 1 March | Niram Maaratha Pookkal நிறம் மாறாத பூக்கள் | Zee Tamil | 100th | soap opera | |
| 1 March | Valli வள்ளி | Sun TV | 1500th | soap opera | |
| 2 March | Sumangali சுமங்கலி | Sun TV | 300th | soap opera | |
| 2 March | Mahalakshmi மகாலட்சுமி | Sun TV | 300th | soap opera | |
| 5 March | Thamarai தாமரை | Sun TV | 1000th | soap opera | |
| 5 March | Sembaruthi செம்பருத்தி | Zee Tamil | 100th | soap opera | |
| 5 March | Raja Rani ராஜா ராணி | Vijay TV | 200th | soap opera | |
| 12 March | Thai Veedu தாய் வீடு | Vendhar TV | 100th | soap opera | |
| 14 March | Iniya Iru Malargal இனிய இரு மலர்கள் | Zee Tamil | 500th | Dubbed | |
| 20 March | Azhagu அழகு | Sun TV | 100th | soap opera | |
| 22 March | Pagal Nilavu பகல் நிலவு | Vijay TV | 500th | soap opera | |
| 16 April | Mullum Malarum முள்ளும் மலரும் | Zee Tamil | 100th | soap opera | |
| 23 April | Thalayanai Pookal தலையணைப் பூக்கள் | Zee Tamil | 500th | soap opera | |
| 24 April | Ganga கங்கா | Sun TV | 400th | soap opera | |
| 27 April | Priyamanaval பிரியமானவள் | Sun TV | 1000th | soap opera | |

=== Ending this year ===
| End date | Show | Channel | First aired | Status | Note | Source |
|---|---|---|---|---|---|---|
| 6 January | Yamuna யமுனா | Sun TV | 28 November 2016 | Canceled | Dubbed | |
| 12 January | Mahamayi மகமாயி | Zee Tamil | 29 February 2016 | Canceled | Dubbed | |
| 20 January | Vidhi விதி | Sun TV | 6 March 2017 | Ended | soap opera | |
| 20 January | Yes or No யெஸ் ஆர் நோ | Vijay TV | 23 September 2017 | Ended | Reality | |
| 21 January | Mrs. Chinnathirai மிஸஸ் சின்னத்திரை | Vijay TV | 24 September 2017 | Ended | Reality | |
| 11 February | Star Wars Season 1 ஸ்டார் வார்ஸ் 1 | Sun TV | 5 November 2017 | Ended | Stunt/dare | |
| 17 February | Deivamagal தெய்வமகள் | Sun TV | 25 March 2013 | Ended | soap opera | |
| 23 February | Tamil Kadavul Murugan தமிழ்க்கடவுள் முருகன் | Vijay TV | 2 October 2017 | Ended | soap opera | |
| 27 April | Thai Veedu தாய் வீடு | Vendhar TV | 23 October 2017 | Ended | soap opera | |
| 27 April | Ninaika Therintha Manamae நினைக்க தெரிந்த மனமே | Vijay TV | 25 December 2017 | Ended | soap opera | |
| 10 June | Villa To Village வில்லா டு வில்லேஜ் | Vijay TV | 17 March 2018 | Ended | Reality, Game show | |
| 30 September | Bigg Boss Tamil 2 பிக் பாஸ் தமிழ் 2 | Vijay TV | 30 September 2018 | Ended | Reality | |

== Deaths ==
| Date | Name | Age | Notability | Source |
|---|---|---|---|---|
| 22 January | Ceylon Manohar சிலோன் மனோகர் | 73 | Pop singer and actor. He acted in Tamil, Sri Lankan Tamil and Bollywood pop singer and film actor. He acted in Tamil serial as Athipookal, Thirumathi Selvam and Anjali. | |
| 17 February | Desingu Raja தேசிங் ராஜா | 43 | Tamil television and film actor | |
