= VJ Chitra =

Indian television actress (1992–2020)

- Born: Chitra Kamaraj; 2 May 1992; Chennai, Tamil Nadu, India
- Died: 9 December 2020 (aged 28); Nazarethpettai, Tamil Nadu, India
- Cause of death: Suicide by hanging
- Education: Justice Basheer Ahmed Sayeed College For Women (2012–2014)
- Occupations: Television actress; video jockey; anchor
- Years active: 2013–2020

Chitra Kamaraj (2 May 1992 – 9 December 2020), better known as VJ Chitra, was an Indian television actress and anchor. She rose to fame with her role in the Tamil soap opera Pandian Stores, and made her film acting debut in Calls (2021). She is well known for her appearances in shows such as Vilayadu Vaagai Soodu (2012), Sattam Solvathu Enna? (2013), Saravanan Meenatchi (2013–17), Nodiku Nodi Athiradi (2014), Oor Suthalaam Vaanga (2014), Mannan Magal (2014), En Samayal Araiyil (2014), Ossthi Comedy Kusthi (2014), Ring O Ring (2014), Chinna Papa Periya Papa (2014–18), Darling Darling (2016–17), Dance Jodi Dance (2016–17), Velunachi (2018) and Pandian Stores (2018–20).

On 9 December 2020, Chitra was found dead in a hotel room in Nazarethpettai in an apparent suicide by hanging. On 15 December 2020, her husband Hemanth Ravi was arrested and charged with helping her commit suicide. Police are still currently investigating the case.

== Career ==
Chitra Kamaraj was born on 2 May 1992 in Chennai. Before becoming a full-time actress, she was a television host. After seeing Chitra host a television show, Radhika reached out with an offer for her to act in Chinna Papa Periya Papa (2016) alongside actresses Nirosha and Nalini. The success of the series prompted her to sign up for other shows including Saravanan Meenatchi, Velunachi. In Pandian Stores, Chitra portrayed the character Mullai, the role was replaced by Kaavya Arivumani after her death, and later by Laavanya.

Chitra signed on to appear in her first film role in mid-2019 through Calls (2021). The film would feature her as a business process outsourcing professional and was shot in late 2019. It also marked her only film appearance.

== Personal life ==
Chitra got engaged to Hemanth Ravi, a businessman, in August 2020, and the couple got married in October 2020. Her wedding was scheduled to be in February 2021 before her death.

== Death ==
On 9 December 2020, Chitra was found dead in a hotel room in Nazarethpettai at 9:32 am. Reports and autopsy results suggest that Chitra died from suicide by hanging. On 15 December 2020, her fiance was arrested and charged with criminal offenses. However, police officers are still investigating the case.

== Filmography ==
=== Television performances ===
List of performances on television
Year	Title	Role(s)	Channel(s)
2012	Vilayadu Vaagai Soodu	Anchor	Makkal TV
2013	Sattam Solvathu Enna?	Anchor	Makkal TV
2013–16	Saravanan Meenatchi (season 2)	Kalaiyarasi (Vettaiyan's Friend)	Star Vijay
2014	Nodiku Nodi Athiradi	Anchor	Makkal TV
2014	Oor Suthalaam Vaanga	Anchor	Makkal TV
2014	Mannan Magal	Vishali	Jaya TV
2014	En Samayal Araiyil	Anchor	Makkal TV
2014	Ossthi Comedy Kusthi	Anchor	Raadan
2014	Ring O Ring	Contestant	Vendhar TV
2014–16	Chinna Papa Periya Papa Season 3	Periya Papa	Sun TV
2015	Saa Boo Thri Season 2	Anchor	Vendhar TV
2015	Jill Jung Juk	Anchor	Vendhar TV
2016–17	Darling Darling	Anitha (Honey)	Zee Tamil
2016–17	Dance Jodi Dance Season 1	contestant	Zee Tamil
2016–17	Nanbenda	Participant	Zee Tamil
2016–18	Aaha Maamiyar Oho Marumagal	Anchor	Zee Tamil
2017	Saravanan Meenatchi (season 3)	Ghost (Special Appearance)	Star Vijay
2017	Zee Dance League	Contestant	Zee Tamil
2017–18	Anjarai Petty	Host	Zee Tamil
2018	Velunachi	Velunachi	Colors Tamil
2018–19	Jodi Fun Unlimited	Contestant	Star Vijay
2018–20	Pandian Stores	Mullai	Star Vijay
2019	Raja Rani (Season1)	Mullai (special appearance)	Star Vijay
2019	Vasool Vettai	Anchor	Star Vijay
2020	Bharathi Kannamma	Mullai (special appearance)	Star Vijay

=== Film appearance ===
List of performances in film
Year	Title	Role	Notes
2021	Calls	Nandhini	Posthumous Release
2023	Parivarthanai	Naveen's mother	Posthumous Release (Photo presence)

== Awards ==
These awards were awarded posthumously.
Year	Artist/Work	Award	Category	Result	Ref.
2021	Chithra	Behindwoods Gold Icons	Most Celebrated Actress On Television	Won	
2021	Chithra	Femina Awards	Super Daughter	Won	
2021	Pandiyan Stores	Vijay Television Awards	Makkalin Naayagi	Won	
2021	Pandiyan Stores	Vijay Television Awards	Best Actress	Nominated	
2021	Pandiyan Stores	Vijay Television Awards	Best Marumagal	Nominated	
2021	Pandiyan Stores	Vijay Television Awards	Best Daughter	Nominated	
2021	Pandiyan Stores	Vijay Television Awards	Best On Screen Pair	Nominated	
2021	Life Time Achievement	Vijay Television Awards	Makkalin Nayagi (People's Actress)	Won	
