= Bharathi Kannamma (2014 TV series) =

Indian Tamil-language soap opera

- பாரதி கண்ணம்மா
- Genre: Soap opera
- Created by: V. J. Chitra
- Written by: A.K.Pandiya; Dialogues written by V. Vetrivel Santhirasekar
- Directed by: Nimesh (Episode 125-219); S.Senthil Kumaran B.E (Episode 88-124); S.Bala (Episode 1-87)
- Starring: remona Mithira Sri; Selvaraj; Sai Latha; Mohana; Rithiya; Birla boss
- Original language: Tamil
- No. of seasons: 1
- No. of episodes: 219

Production
- Camera setup: Multi-camera
- Running time: approx. 20-22 minutes per episode

Original release
- Network: Vendhar TV
- Release: 1 June 2014 – 3 July 2015

Bharathi Kannamma (Tamil: பாரதி கண்ணம்மா) is a 2014 Indian Tamil-language soap opera that aired on Vendhar TV from 1 June 2014 to 3 July 2015 on Monday through Friday at 07:30 p.m. IST for 219 episodes.

The show stars remona, Mithira Sri, Selvaraj, Sai Latha, Mohana, Birla boss and Ilavarasan. The show directed by Nimesh, S.Senthil Kumaran B.E and S.Bala. It was also aired in Malaysia Tamil Channel on Astro Vaanavil.

== Plot ==
Barathi Kanamma is a story about two girls who hate each other from their childhood, but later become best friends.

== Cast ==
- Mithrasri
- Selvaraj
- Vidhya boss
- Sai Latha
- Rithiya
- Gowthami
- Brila Bose
- Ilavarasan
- Mohana as Karpagam (Bharathi's mother)
- Ramakirushnan
- Annamalai
- Sobhana
- Kandukondain kandukondain fame Madhu Mohan as Maaran

== International broadcast ==
- In Malaysia Tamil Channel on Astro Vaanavil. It aired Monday through Friday at 11:00 a.m. and 4:30 p.m.
