= Anbe Vaa =

Anbe Vaa (transl. Come, my love) may refer to:

- Anbe Vaa (1966 film), an Indian Tamil-language film
- Anbe Vaa (2005 film), an Indian Tamil-language film
- Anbe Vaa (2009 TV series), an Indian Tamil-language soap opera
- Anbe Vaa (2020 TV series), a 2020 Indian Tamil-language soap opera
