= Aniyathi =

Aniyathi may refer to:

- Aniyathi (film), a 1955 Indian Malayalam film
- Aniyathi (TV series), an Indian television series
