= Kiyo Sen =

Kiyo*Sen is the name of a Japanese fusion jazz duo created in 2013. The band consists of a core collaboration between Kiyomi Otaka, the keyboard player of Japanese fusion group Casiopea-P4 and the Japanese drummer Senri Kawaguchi; they are often accompanied by guest artists playing guitar and bass. As of 2023 the duo has released eight albums, two live DVDs and a single; they have also toured a number of venues in Japan.

== Discography ==
=== Studio albums ===
Title	Album details
Chocolate Booster	Catalogue Number: VGDBRZ0053; Released: 18 January 2014; Label: VEGA Music Entertainment; Format: CD Album
DUOLOGY	Catalogue Number: VGDBRZ0060; Released: 24 June 2015; Label: VEGA Music Entertainment; Format: CD Album
Trick or Treat	Catalogue Number: VGDBRZ-0065; Released: 2 September 2016; Label: VEGA Music Entertainment; Format: CD Album
organizer	Catalogue Number: ELFA-1816; Released: 4 July 2018; Label: Elec Records; Format: CD Album
DRUMATICA	Catalogue Number: YZAG-1105; Released: 6 November 2019; Label: Elec Records; Format: CD Album

=== Live albums ===
Title	Album details
KIYO*SEN Jazz Live at Virtuoso	Catalogue Number: VTS 005; Released: 27 May 2020; Label: Virtuoso; Format: CD Album
KIYO*SEN Jazz Live at Virtuoso 「DEUX」	Catalogue Number: VTS 007; Released: 2 December 2013; Label: Virtuoso; Format: CD Album

=== Singles ===
Title	Album details
Exatune	Catalogue Number: AGCT-1002; Released: 10 April 2022; Label: Elec Records/airgroove; Format: CD Maxi Single

=== Live DVDs ===
Title	Album details
Choco-Boo Live!	Catalogue Number: VGVJFZ0005; Release date: 26 April 2014; Label: Vega Music Entertainment; Format: NTSC DVD
ANOTHER LIVE WORLD	Catalogue Number: AND75; Release date: 4 July 2018; Label: Alfanote; Format: NTSC DVD
