= Yuvanraj Nethrun =

Indian television actor (1979–2024)

- Born: Murugan; 1979
- Died: 3 December 2024 (aged 45)
- Occupation: Actor
- Years active: 1999–2024
- Spouse: Deepa
- Children: 2

Yuvanraj Nethrun (Tamil: நடிகர் நேத்ரன்; 1979 – 3 December 2024) was an Indian actor known for his work in Tamil television and reality shows. He gained recognition for his role in television serial Marudhani. He worked in shows like Singapennae, Ponni, Mannan Magal, and Mahalakshmi.

== Career ==
Yuvanraj Nethrun started his acting career as a child artist. He worked in the industry for over 25 years.

=== Television ===
Nethrun initially played negative roles mostly. He rose to fame after his role in a Tamil language television series Marudhani. He worked in soaps like Singapennae, Ranjithame, Paavam Ganesan, Ponni, Baakiyalakshmi, Mannan Magal, Raja Magal and Mahalakshmi.

=== Film ===
Apart from television serials, he played few supporting roles in Tamil cinema as well.

=== Reality shows ===
Nethrun participated in multiple reality shows on Star Vijay and Sun TV. He was the winner on Sun TV's dance-based reality show Masthana Masthana. He was a participant in Vijay Television's Jodi Number 1 Season 3 and 5. Mr and Mrs Chinnathirai and Super Kudumbam are some of the other shows he took a part in.

== Personal life and death ==
Nethrun was married to Deepa, a Tamil film and television actress and have two daughters

Nethrun died of stomach cancer on 3 December 2024 at the age of 45, survived by his wife, Deepa Murugan, and two daughters.
