= Darling Darling (TV series) =

Indian Tamil-language soap opera

- Genre: Soap opera; Comedy; Romance; Sitcom
- Based on: Bhabiji Ghar Par Hain!
- Starring: Ramji; V. J. Chitra; Nandhini; Nalini; Monkey Ravi; Sri Vidhya Shankar
- Opening theme: "Ikkaraiku Akkarai Pacha" by Gana Bala
- Country of origin: India
- Original language: Tamil
- No. of episodes: 102

Production
- Editor: PM achuthan
- Camera setup: Multi-camera
- Running time: 22 minutes

Original release
- Network: Zee Tamil
- Release: 19 December 2016 – 10 June 2017

Darling Darling is a 2016 Tamil language comedy soap opera starring Ramji, V. J. Chitra, Nalini, Sri Vidhya Shankar, Monkey Ravi, Vasanth Gopinath and Nandhini. The show premiered on 12 December 2016. The show is an adaptation of the &TV series Bhabiji Ghar Par Hain! The show last aired on 10 June 2017 and ended with 102 episodes.

== Cast ==
- Ramji as Venkatesh (Vicky)
- V. J. Chitra as Anitha (Honey, Vicky's wife)
- Vasanth Gopinath as Natarajan (Nattu)
- Nandhini as Rukkumani (Rukku, Nattu's wife)
- Sri Vidhya Shankar as Vicky's mother
- Nalini as Nattu's mother
- Monkey Ravi as Gopi

== Soundtrack ==
The album was released officially Diwali on 29 October 2016 at the Deepavali special program hosted by Deepak Dinkar.

- Title: Darling Darling OST
- Artist: Gana Bala
- Language: Tamil
- Release date: 29 October 2016
- Number of tracks: 1
- Publisher: Zee Music Company
- Agency: Zee Music Company

Track listing
No.	Title	Lyrics	Singer(s)	Length
1.	"Darling DA DA DA Darling (டார்லிங் டா டா டா டார்லிங்) (Making Video)"	DAKO	Gana Bala	3:11
2.	"Darling DA DA DA Darling (டார்லிங் டா டா டா டார்லிங்) (Title Song)"	DAKO	Gana Bala	2:17

=== Airing history ===
The show started airing on Zee Tamil on 19 December 2016, and aired on Monday through Friday at 10:00PM (IST). Starting from Monday 24 April 2017, the show was shifted to every Saturday at 10:00PM (IST).

== Adaptations ==
Language	Title	Original release	Network(s)	Last aired	Notes
Hindi	Bhabiji Ghar Par Hain! भाभीजी घर पर हैं!	2 March 2015	And TV	2026	Original
Tamil	Darling Darling டார்லிங் டார்லிங்	12 December 2016	Zee Tamil	10 June 2017	Remake
Marathi	Hum To Tere Aashiq Hai हम तो तेरे आशिक है	8 November 2017	Zee Marathi	12 September 2018	Remake
