= Ninaithale Inikkum (talk show) =

- Genre: Talk show
- Directed by: Dinakaran S
- Presented by: Khushboo Sundar
- Country of origin: India
- Original language: Tamil
- No. of seasons: 1
- No. of episodes: 22

Production
- Camera setup: Multi-camera
- Running time: approx. 60-120 minutes per episode
- Production company: Vendhar TV

Original release
- Network: Vendhar TV
- Release: 30 August 2014 – 5 April 2015

Ninaithale Inikkum is an Indian Tamil-language television talk show, which aired for 22 episodes on Vendhar TV from 30 August 2014 to 5 April 2015 on every Sunday at 12:00PM IST. The talk show was presented by Tamil cinema actress Khushboo Sundar. The show features many segments including a whacky self indulging make-up by the celebrities, surprise guests either from the celebrity's family or friends, shopping, and many more.

== Guests ==
- Episode 1 & 2: Khushboo Sundar
- Episode 3: Sivakarthikeyan
- Episode 4: Vivek
- Episode 5: Jiiva & Thulasi Nair
- Episode 6: Vijay Sethupathi & Ramesh Thilak
- Episode 7 & 8: K. Bhagyaraj
- Episode 9: Priya Anand
- Episode 10 & 11: R. Sarathkumar
- Episode 12: Sundar C
- Episode 13: Kovai Sarala
- Episode 14: S. J. Surya
- Episode 15: Siddharth
- Episode 16: Atharvaa
- Episode 17: Gautham Vasudev Menon
- Episode 18: Poornima Bhagyaraj
- Episode 19: Nadhiya
- Episode 20: Venkat Prabhu
- Episode 21: Jayam Ravi
- Episode 22: Radhika Sarathkumar

== International broadcast ==
The series was released on 30 August 2014 on Vendhar TV. It was also broadcast internationally on the channel's international distribution. It airs in Australia, United States, Europe and Canada on Athavan TV. The show's episodes were released on Vendhar TV's YouTube channel.

Country	Network	Timeslot
India	Vendhar TV	Sunday; 12:00PM IST
Australia	Athavan TV	Sunday; 1:00PM
Canada	Athavan TV	Sunday; 1:00PM
(European Union) Europa	Athavan TV	Sunday; 1:00PM
United States	Athavan TV	Sunday; 1:00PM
