= Calls (film) =

2021 crime thriller film by J. Sabarish

- Theatrical release poster
- Directed by: J. Sabarish
- Written by: J. Sabarish
- Starring: V. J. Chitra; Vinodhini; Devadarshini; R. Sundarrajan
- Cinematography: J.Sabarish
- Edited by: J.Sabarish
- Music by: Thameem Ansari
- Production company: Infinite Pictures
- Distributed by: Rockfort Entertainment
- Release date: 26 February 2021
- Running time: 151 minutes
- Country: India
- Language: Tamil

Calls is a 2021 Indian Tamil-language crime thriller film written and directed by J. Sabarish. The film stars V. J. Chitra (in her only film appearance), Vinodhini, Devadarshini and R. Sundarrajan. Shot between mid-2019 and March 2020, it had its theatrical release on 26 February 2021, two months after Chitra's death.

== Plot ==
Nandhini takes a job at a call centre due to her family situation. Her manager challenges her with renewing the subscriptions of at least 20 customers in a day or she will be fired.

== Cast ==
- V. J. Chitra as Nandhini
- Sriranjani as Bhagya Lakshmi, Nandhini's mother
- Jeeva Ravi as Govindhan, Nandhini's father
- Devadarshini as Sangeetha
- Thidiyan as Caesar/Srinivasan
- Nizhalgal Ravi as Nandhini's manager
- Vinodhini Vaidyanathan as Shailaja Deputy Director
- R. Sundarrajan as Security Alagar
- Delhi Ganesh as Karunakaran
- Monica as Yashika
- Pradeep as Yashika's father
- Malavika as Nivetha, Nandhini's friend
- Supergood Subramani as Azhagesan
- Hello Kandasamy as Lawyer
- Meesai Rajendran as SI Rajendran

== Production ==
In September 2019, it was revealed that the television actress V. J. Chitra would make her film acting debut. Chitra signed on to appear in her first Tamil film role in mid-2019 through Calls. She was cast in the role of a business process outsourcing professional. Principal photography commenced in mid-2019 and wrapped in March 2020.

The filmmaker J. Sabarish initially planned to cast Riythvika in the lead role but he later changed his mind after noticing Riythvika taking part in the second season of the Tamil reality series Bigg Boss. He then insisted to cast either Mahima Nambiar or Arthana Binu but both of them had reportedly turned down the offer. Sabarish finalised on Chitra, who rose to limelight and prominence following her breakthrough performance through Star Vijay's television soap opera Pandian Stores.

== Release ==
The film initially supposed to have its theatrical release in July 2020 but it was postponed due to the COVID-19 pandemic. The filmmakers later confirmed the theatrical release of the film on 26 February 2021 and unveiled the official trailer of the film on 29 January 2021. It also marks the only film appearance of Chitra, who died two months before the film's release.

== Reception ==
Shameena Parveen from Samayam gave the film a rating of 1 1/2 out of 5. Maalai Malar praised Chitra's performance but felt the other characters were uninteresting, and the director failed to clearly explain the point he was trying to make through the screenplay. Thinkal Menon of The Times of India wrote, "Despite an earnest performance from Chitra and Sriranjini, the movie turns out to be a hotchpotch of weak characters and unproductive sub-plots".
