= Mudivalla Arambam (TV series) =

- Cover photo
- Genre: Soap opera
- Directed by: Navin Khirushna; K. Rangaraj
- Original language: Tamil
- No. of seasons: 2
- No. of episodes: 54

Production
- Production locations: Ooty; Tamil Nadu
- Camera setup: Multi-camera
- Running time: approx. 20-22 minutes per episode

Original release
- Network: Vendhar TV
- Release: 25 August – 7 November 2014

Mudivalla Arambam (transl. This is not the end, but the beginning) is a 2014-2014 soap opera that aired on Vendhar TV and aired Monday through Friday at 8:00PM IST. For the first time in Tamil television history, an innovative attempt in fiction brings to you stories that are set in motion from the climax of popular movies. The Show Directed by Navin Khirushna and K. Rangaraj.

== Seasons ==
Seasons	Movie	Original run	Directed by	Starring	No. of episodes
1	Andha 7 Naatkal		Navin Khirushna	Neya Ranjith; M. Arunachalam; Rajesh; Nevetha; Shalini	27
2	Naadodigal		K.Rangaraj	Bose Venkat; Athish; Sridevi; Vasu Vikram; Rajasekar; Sripriya; Nithiya	27
