= Aniyathi (TV series) =

- Genre: Drama
- Written by: Ganesh Olikkara
- Directed by: G.R Krishnan
- Starring: See below
- Country of origin: India
- Original language: Malayalam
- No. of seasons: 1
- No. of episodes: 152

Production
- Producer: Umadharan Kayamkulam
- Production company: UD Creations

Original release
- Network: Mazhavil Manorama
- Release: 14 July 2014 – 20 February 2015

Aniyathi (ml; അനിയത്തി) (English: Younger Sister) is an Indian television series which launched on the channel Mazhavil Manorama. The show stars Meera Muraleedharan and Gowri Krishna in the leading roles. It replaced the series Pattu Saree, and ended on 20 February 2015 after running for 152 episodes.

== Plot ==
The story revolves around a traditional family settled in Kerala with parents Sathyaprakash Menon and Prabha, and focuses on the trials and tribulations faced by sisters Gayathri and Gowri. The lives of the sisters get more complicated when elder daughter Gayathri finds herself in a challenging situation.

The story ends when Gowri and Gayathri overcome all their problems and Gayathri marries her lover Alan Joseph. Shortly after this Gowri is diagnosed with cancer, a great shock to all those who love her. However, this does not stop her from fighting for what is right.

In the final episode Gowri travels abroad for medical treatment, and her family and friends await her safe return.

== Cast ==
=== Main cast ===
- Gowri Krishnan as Gowri Shankar
- Meera Muralidharan as Gayathri Alan

=== Additional Cast ===
- Rizabawa as Sathyaprakash Menon (dead)
- Reena as Prabha Menon (dead)
- Shaji Thilakan as Pookadan Paulose
- Santhosh Sasidharan as Sunny Paulose Pookadan
- Sarath Das as Alan Joseph
- Ambareesh as Sankar
- Sayana as Sayana Paulose Pookadan
- Bijoy Varghese as Benny Paulose Pookadan
- Indulekha as Susan Benny
- Bindhu Varapuzha as Annamma Paulose
- Roslin
- Vijayakumari
- Amritha Varnan
- Parvathi T
- Subbalakshmi
- Santhosh Kurup
- Sreekala
- Ibrahim Kutty
- Devi Chandana
- Ranjith Raj
- Kavitha as Circle Inspector
