= Tu Ashi Jawali Raha =

2018 Indian Marathi language TV series

- Genre: Drama
- Starring: See below
- Country of origin: India
- Original language: Marathi
- No. of episodes: 342

Production
- Production locations: Mumbai, Maharashtra
- Camera setup: Multi-camera
- Running time: 22 minutes

Original release
- Network: Zee Yuva
- Release: 1 October 2018 – 31 October 2019

Tu Ashi Jawali Raha (transl. You stay so close) is an Indian Marathi language drama series which aired on Zee Yuva. It stars Titeeksha Tawde and Siddharth Bodke in lead roles. It premiered from 1 October 2018 and ended on 31 October 2019 completing 342 episodes.

== Plot ==
The story revolves around Manva, a fiercely independent girl, who falls in love with Rajveer, who has a dominating nature. Over a period, Rajveer gets insecure and turns possessive which forces Manva to leave him.

== Cast ==
=== Main ===
- Titeeksha Tawde as Manva Ajay Sawantrao / Manva Rajveer Mohite-Patil
- Siddharth Bodke as Rajveer Mohite-Patil

=== Recurring ===
- Milind Gawali as Colonel Ajay Sawantrao
- Sulekha Talwalkar as Aarti Ajay Sawantrao
- Ruturaj Phadke as Yash Mohite-Patil
- Niranjan Kulkarni as Nitish Sawantrao
- Bhakti Ratnaparkhi as Ranjana Mohite-Patil
- Vishwanath Kulkarni as Sakha
- Sangram Samel

== Adaptations ==
Language	Title	Original release	Network(s)	Last aired	Notes
Marathi	Tu Ashi Jawali Raha तू अशी जवळी राहा	1 October 2018	Zee Yuva	31 October 2019	Original
Malayalam	Sumangali Bhava സുമംഗലീ ഭവഃ	1 July 2019	Zee Keralam	24 January 2021	Remake
