= Chinna Papa Periya Papa =

Indian Tamil-language soap opera

- Genre: Sitcom
- Written by: Radaan Mediaworks
- Directed by: S. N. Sakthevel; Suki Moorthy; M A Mani
- Creative director: Radhika Sarathkumar
- Starring: Sripriya; Nalini; Nirosha; Kalpana; Seema; Renuka; Devadarshini; V. J. Chitra; Jangiri Madhumitha
- Theme music composer: Dhina (Season 1 - 2); Vijay Antony (Season 3)
- Opening theme: "Chinna Papa Periya Papa" (Vocals); Pushpavanam Kuppusamy (Season 1); Vijay Antony (Season 3); Kadhal Mathi (Lyrics)
- Country of origin: India
- Original language: Tamil
- No. of seasons: 3
- No. of episodes: 400+

Production
- Producer: Radhika Sarathkumar
- Production location: Chennai
- Cinematography: P. Dharma
- Editors: K. Sathiyabalan; V.Muthukrishnan
- Camera setup: Multi-camera
- Running time: approx. 45 - 50 minutes per episode
- Production company: Radaan Mediaworks

Original release
- Network: Sun TV
- Release: 2000 – 5 May 2018

Chinna Papa Periya Papa is an Indian-Tamil language sitcom television series that aired on Sun TV. Over eighteen years, Chinna Papa Periya Papa has rolled out three seasons. The first season was premiered on 2000. The series is produced by Radhika Sarathkumar under the banner of Radaan Mediaworks.

It initially starred Sripriya as Chinna Pappa and Nirosha as Periya Pappa. Later Kalpana as Chinna Pappa followed by Seema and Nalini, with Renuka as Periya Pappa followed by Devadarshini and V. J. Chitra.

Season 1 and Season 2 -218 episodes Season 3 (2014-2018) -174 episodes

== Plot ==
=== Season 1 ===
The first season of Chinna Papa Periya Papa was set in 1999. Chinna Papa is a wealthy woman who lives in Indra Nagar, who loves money and showing off. She is married to Vasudevan and has a son Harish. Harish is married to Periya Papa aka Kavitha. Pattabi is Periya Papa's brother-in-law who stays with the family. The series is about funny situations in their home which usually ends up in a bad note, mostly with the mother-in-law and daughter-in-law duo's fight and the men getting in between and wacked. Pattabi becomes Chinna Papa's sidekick and aids in many situation to help the family gain more money, but as usual, it ends up bad for the whole family or a few members of the family.

=== Season 2 ===
Following the abandonment of his sister-in-laws family in the middle of season 2, Pattabi is adopted by another Chinna Papa, Periya Papa family leading to a new cast in the reminder of season 2. A new addition of Periya Papa's son, Pizza is introduced. Similar hilarious situation follow them as well.

=== Season 3 ===
Season 3 is once again with Chinna Papa (Nalini) and Periya Papa (VJ Chitra) being introduced with Pappu(Jangiri Madhumitha) and Chinnapapa's two sons Gopalakrishnan and Balakrishnan and her brother Thirisangu (Seshu) (2014-2015)/ 'Vajju'(Shevaraj)(2015-2018)

== Cast ==
=== Season 1 (2000 - 2002) ===
- Sripriya as Chinna Papa alias Vairam
- Nirosha as Periya Papa alias Kavitha
- M. S. Bhaskar as Pattabi
- Madan Bob as Vasudevan
- Suresh Chakravarthi as Harish (Chinna Papa's son and Periya Papa's husband)
- Delhi Kumar as Bakthavachalam (Periya Papa's father)
- Mythili as Annapoorni (Periya Papa's mother)
- Malini Vaman as 'Kurungu' Kusala

=== Season 2 (2003 - 2004) ===
- Sripriya as Chinna Papa (Ep. 1 — 51)
  - Kalpana as Chinna Papa (Ep. 52 — 106)
  - Seema as Chinna Papa (Ep. 107 — 167)
  - Nalini as Chinna Papa (Ep. 168 — 218)
- Nirosha as Periya Papa (Ep. 1 — 106)
  - Pallavi Menon as Periya Papa (Ep. 107 — 167)
  - Devadarshini as Periya Papa (Ep. 168 — 218)
- M. S. Bhaskar as Pattabi
- Mohan Raman as Vasudevan
- Vijay Sarathy as Harish (Chinna Papa's son and Periya Papa's husband)
- Delhi Kumar as Bakthavachalam (Periya Papa's father)
- Mythili as Annapoorni (Periya Papa's mother)
- Malini Vaman as 'Kurungu' Kusala
- Chaams as Chidambaram
- Vasu Vikram as Pazhani
- Vikram Khanna as Pizza

=== Season 3 (2014 - 2018) ===
- Nalini as Chinna Papa
- V. J. Chitra as Pappu, Periya Papa (1 to 97)
  - Jangiri Madhumita as Pappu, Periya papa (98 to 174)
- Nirosha as Kakinada Kanaga Durga, Pappu's mom
- Kurinji Nathan as Kopalakrishnan (Koki), Chinna Papa's younger son and Pappu's husband
- Sheva Raj as Vajrakomban (Vajju)
- Vetrivelan as Balakrishnan (Balki), Chinna Papa's elder son and Periya Papa's husband
- Lollu Sabha Seshu as Thirisangu
- Monkey Ravi
- Lollu Sabha Palaniappan
- Bayilvan Ranganathan

== Production ==
=== Casting ===
The show initially starred Sripriya and Nirosha in a title role. Then, after episode 52, Sripriya's role was replaced by actress Kalpana followed by actress Seema and finally the role was replaced by Nalini. Actress Devadharshini replaced Nirosha's role. Actor M. S. Bhaskar was cast as Pattabi for all 3 seasons.

After a few years the series started with a fresh season with a new cast, which included, in addition to Nalini and Nirosha, Actress V. J. Chitra was introduced as Periya Papa along with Jangiri Madhumitha. It aired on every Saturday at 10:30PM IST.
