= Akashangalil =

- Theatrical release poster
- Directed by: Rixon Xavier
- Produced by: Touching Hearts Movie Makers
- Starring: Shankar; Pooja Vijayan; Ranjith Raj; Rakesh Krishna
- Release date: 2 January 2015
- Country: India
- Language: Malayalam

Akashangalil is a 2015 Indian Malayalam-language film directed by Rixon Xavier, starring veteran actor Shankar in an extended special appearance.

== Plot ==
Akashangalil is the story of Amala (Pooja Vijayan), a retired air hostess, as her marriage with her colleague, a pilot was a failure and divorced as well. Later she becomes close to her driver Ananthu, but Ananthu's family is against this relationship as well as marriage. At this time, Amala's old friend Devadathan (Shankar) who is also a divorcee comes forward to give a life to Amala. Music directed by Abhijith P S Nair

== Cast ==
- Shankar - Devadathan
- Pooja Vijayan - Amala
- Ranjith Raj
- Rakesh Krishna
