= Darshana Das =

Indian television actress

- Born: 31 March 1992 (age 34); Palakkad, Kerala, India
- Occupation: Actress
- Years active: 2012–present
- Spouse: Anoop Krishnan (m. 2020)
- Children: 1

Darshana Das (born 31 March 1992) is an Indian television actress who works in Malayalam-language soap operas.

== Career ==
Darshana made her mini-screen debut through Pattu Saree as a soft-spoken village belle. Her first negative character was Priyanka of 2015 television series 4 the people. She rose into fame playing a negative shaded lead role Gayathri in Karuthamuthu. She played the lead role in Sumangali Bhava but later quit the show. Later she appeared as the main antagonist Sarayu in Mounaragam but had to leave the show due to pregnancy.

== Filmography ==
=== Film ===
List of Darshana Das film credits
Year	Title	Role	Notes
2015	Oru Vadakkan Selfie	Model	Cameo
2015	Tharakangale Sakshi	Suma	Lead role
2024	Kurukku	Ansiya	Supporting role

=== Serials ===
- All serials are in Malayalam, unless otherwise noted.

List of Darshana Das television serial credits
Year	Serial	Role	TV Channel	Notes
2012–2014	Pattu Saree	Varalakshmi	Mazhavil Manorama	
2015	Dhathuputhri	Radhika	Mazhavil Manorama	
2015–2016	4 the people	Priyanka	Asianet	
2016–2017	Valli	Shalini Arun	Sun TV	Tamil Serial
2016–2017	Ennu Swantham Jaani	Thamara	Surya TV	
2017–2019	Karuthamuthu	Gayathri Ganeshan (née Jayan)	Asianet	Won , Asianet Television Awards for Most Popular Actress 2018
2019	Sumangali Bhava	Vaidehi (Devu)	Zee Keralam	Replaced by Sonu Satheesh Kumar
2019	Pookkalam Varavayi	Vaidehi (Devu)	Zee Keralam	Combined promo with Mridula Vijay
2019–2020; 2022-2026	Mounaragam	Sarayu	Asianet	Replaced by Madhusri in 2020; Replaced Pratheeksha G Pradeep in 2022
2020	Bhoomiyile Malakhamar	Jessy	Goodness TV	Telefilm
2022–2023	Swantham Sujatha	Dr.Annapoorna	Surya TV	
2023	Patharamattu	Sarayu	Asianet	Mahasangamam episodes with Mounaragam

=== Television shows ===
List of Darshana Das television credits
Year	Title	Role	TV Channel	Notes
2017	The People's Choice	Participant	Asianet	
2018	Onnum Onnum Moonu	Guest	Mazhavil Manorama	
2022	Kutti Kalavara Seniors	Contestant	Flowers TV	
2022–2023	Njanum Entalum	Participant with her husband Anoop	Zee Keralam	

== Personal life ==
Darshana was born in Palakkad, Kerala. She is graduated in English literature. She has described herself as a reserved person. She married boyfriend Anoop Krishnan in 2020, the assistant director of Sumangali Bhava in which is played the female lead. The couple reside in Thodupuzha. The couple have a son.
