= Sarath Kumar (actor) =

Indian actor (died 2015)

- Born: 1991 or 1992; Kizhakkanela, Kerala, India
- Died: 26 February 2015 (aged 23); Mylakkadu, Kerala, India
- Occupation: Actor
- Years active: 2005–2015
- Notable work: Autograph

Sarath Kumar (1991 or 1992 – 26 February 2015) was an Indian actor who appeared in Malayalam television soap operas. He is best known for playing the character Rahul Krishnan in the Asianet television serial Autograph (2009–2012).

== Career ==
Sarath made his television debut in 2005 with Rajasenan's devotional series Krishna Kripa Sagaram on Amrita TV. He gained recognition for his portrayal of Rahul Krishnan in the Asianet teen drama serial Autograph (2009–2012). He also appeared in series such as Swami Ayyappan (2006–2008), Sree Mahabhagavatham (2008–2010), Veera Marthanda Varma (2010–2011), Pattu Saree (2012–2014), Sarayu (2013–2014), Chandanamazha (2014–2015), and Dhathuputhri (2015).

== Personal life and death ==
Sarath hails from Kizhakkanela in Kollam district, Kerala. He was a B.Com student at the Sabari College in Parippally. On 26 February 2015, Sarath died in a road accident at Mylakkadu at the age of 23, while on his way to Sasthamkotta for a serial shooting.

== Television ==
Year(s)	Title	Role	Channel	Notes	Ref.
2005	Krishna Kripa Sagaram	—	Amrita TV	Uncredited	
2006–2008	Swami Ayyappan	Kannan	Asianet		
2008–2010	Sree Mahabhagavatham	Prasanna	Asianet		
2009–2012	Autograph	Rahul Krishnan	Asianet		
2010–2011	Veera Marthanda Varma	Raman	Surya TV		
2012	Sree Padmanabham	Aditya Varma	Amrita TV		
2012–2014	Pattu Saree	Chanku	Mazhavil Manorama		
2013–2014	Sarayu	Shaji	Surya TV		
2014–2015	Chandanamazha	Adarsh	Asianet		
2015	Dhathuputhri	Sreekuttan	Mazhavil Manorama		
