= Parivarthanai =

2023 Tamil film

- Directed by: S. Manibharathi
- Produced by: Pori Senthivel
- Starring: Surjith; Swathi; Rajeshwari
- Cinematography: K. Gokul
- Edited by: Rolex
- Music by: Rashaanth Arwin
- Production company: MSV Productions
- Release date: 15 September 2023
- Country: India
- Language: Tamil

Parivarthanai (transl. Transaction) is a 2023 Indian Tamil-language film directed by S. Manibharathi and starring Surjith and Swathi in the lead roles. It was released on 15 September 2023.

== Cast ==
- Surjith as Naveen
- Swathi as Pavithra
- Rajeshwari as Nandini
- Bharathi Mohan
- Divya Sridhar
- Mohith
- Smeha
- VJ Chitra as Naveen's mother (photo presence)

== Production ==
Director S. Manibharathi worked on the film while working on the post-production work of his other film, The Bed starring Srikanth. Several television actors were cast in the film.

== Reception ==
The film was released on 15 September 2023 across theatres in Tamil Nadu, after a week's delay from the original release date. A critic from Dina Thanthi gave the film a negative review, questioning the "logic" of certain scenes. A reviewer from Maalai Malar, in contrast, called the film "enjoyable".
