= Sthreedhanam (Television series) =

Indian Malayalam-language television soap opera

- സ്ത്രീധനം
- Genre: Soap opera Family drama
- Directed by: Krishnamoorthy
- Starring: Divya Padmini; Rajeev Roshan; Chitra Shenoy; Sonu Satheesh Kumar; Arya Rohit
- Country of origin: India
- Original language: Malayalam
- No. of episodes: 1,143

Production
- Producer: R. Ramesh Babu

Original release
- Network: Asianet
- Release: 2 July 2012 – 14 May 2016

Sthreedhanam (transl. Dowry) is an Indian Malayalam-language television soap opera broadcast on Asianet from 2 July 2012 to 14 May 2016. Directed by Krishnamoorthy and produced by R. Ramesh Babu, the series depicts conflicts within a family over dowry demands and relationships between mothers-in-law and daughters-in-law. The principal cast included Divya Padmini, Rajeev Roshan and Chitra Shenoy. It ended with its 1,143rd episode.

Sthreedhanam won Best Serial at the 2013 Asianet Television Awards and Most Popular Serial at the 2014 awards. The Tamil-language drama Ponnukku Thanga Manasu was subsequently adapted from the series.

== Plot ==
The story follows Divya, a woman from the Meledath family who marries Prashanthan, a son of Sethulakshmi and Lakshmanan Pillai of the Palat family. Sethulakshmi is dissatisfied with the dowry provided by Divya's family. Her demands lead to conflict between Divya and her husband's relatives.

The serial also depicts Sethulakshmi's other sons and their wives, including Veni and Pooja. Family loyalties, wealth and marriage are recurring sources of conflict in the household.

== Cast ==
- Divya Padmini (credited as Divya Vishwanath) as Divya
- Rajeev Roshan as Prashanthan
- Chitra Shenoy as Sethulakshmi
- Sonu Satheesh Kumar as Veni
- Arya Rohit as Pooja
- Vishnu Prakash as Lakshmanan Pillai
- Kottayam Rasheed as Mathi Suku
- Sini Varghese as Mayuri
- Ambarish as Prasad
- Rajeev Ganesh as Prakashan
- Molly Kannamaly as Chala Mary
- Senthil Krishna as Natholi Nelson

== Production and broadcast ==
The series' launch connected it to the earlier 1993 film of the same name, itself based on a novel by C. V. Nirmala. The report also identified Krishnamoorthy as director and listed Rajeev Roshan, Chitra Shenoy, Divya and Vishnu Prakash among the cast.

The first episode aired on Asianet on 2 July 2012. Producer R. Ramesh Babu said that the programme was not initially intended to become a long-running production, but audience feedback and television ratings contributed to its continuation. The show moved into a prime-time slot and passed 1,040 episodes by January 2016. At that point, The New Indian Express described it as Asianet's longest-running prime-time show then on air.

The series concluded on 14 May 2016. Filmibeat reported that its final episode was the 1,143rd. In 2018, The Times of India included the programme among Malayalam television dramas that had crossed the 1,000-episode mark.

== Awards ==
Year	Ceremony	Category	Recipient	Result
2013	Asianet Television Awards	Best Serial	Sthreedhanam	Won
2013	Asianet Television Awards	Best Director	Krishnamoorthy	Won
2013	Asianet Television Awards	Best Actress (shared)	Divya Vishwanath	Won
2013	Asianet Television Awards	Most Popular Actress	Divya Vishwanath	Nominated
2013	Asianet Television Awards	Best New Face	Divya Vishwanath	Nominated
2013	Asianet Television Awards	Best Popular Actor	Rajeev Roshan	Won
2013	Asianet Television Awards	Best Character Actor	Vishnu Prakash	Won
2013	Asianet Television Awards	Best New Face	Midhun Menon	Won
2013	Asianet Television Awards	Best Performance in a Negative Role (shared)	Sonu Satheesh Kumar	Won
2013	Asianet Television Awards	Best Performance in a Comical Role	Kottayam Rasheed	Won
2013	Asianet Television Awards	Best Dubbing Artist (Female)	Devi S.	Won
2014	Asianet Television Awards	Most Popular Serial	Sthreedhanam	Won
2014	Asianet Television Awards	Most Popular Actress	Chitra Shenoy	Won
2014	Asianet Television Awards	Most Popular Actress	Divya Vishwanath	Won
2014	Asianet Television Awards	Best Actress	Divya Vishwanath	Nominated
2014	Asianet Television Awards	Best Performance in a Comical Role	Senthil Krishna	Won
2015	Asianet Television Awards	Best Entertainer of the Year	Sthreedhanam	Won
2015	Asianet Television Awards	Best Star Pair	Rajeev Roshan and Divya Vishwanath	Won
2015	Asianet Television Awards	Best Actress	Divya Vishwanath	Nominated
2015	Asianet Television Awards	Most Popular Actress (shared)	Chitra Shenoy	Won
2015	Asianet Television Awards	Best Performance in a Negative Role (shared)	Sonu Satheesh Kumar	Won
2015	Asianet Television Awards	Best Performance in a Comical Role	Kottayam Rasheed	Won
2016	Asianet Television Awards	Best Star Pair	Rajeev Roshan and Divya Vishwanath	Won

== Adaptation ==
The Tamil-language television drama Ponnukku Thanga Manasu, which premiered on Star Vijay in August 2018, was inspired by Sthreedhanam. It followed a similarly named couple, Divya and Prashanth, and a mother-in-law named Sethulakshmi whose dowry demands caused conflict in their marriage.
