= Meera Muralidharan =

Indian television actress

- Born: 1994 (age 31–32); Cherthala, Alappuzha district, Kerala
- Occupations: Actress; Television presenter
- Years active: 2011–2019
- Spouse: Manushankar (m. 2021)

Meera Muralidharan (born 1994) is an Indian television actress and presenter.

== Early and personal life ==
Meera was born in 1994 to P.N Muralidharan and Geetha in Cherthala, Alappuzha district. She married Manushankar in 2021.

== Filmography ==
=== Films ===
Year	Film	Role	Director	Notes	Ref.
2014	Seconds	Sneha	Aneesh Upasana	Movie debut	
2015	Thinkal Muthal Velli Vare	Herself	Kannan Thamarakkulam		
	The Black Age			Short film	
	Kanneer Mazhayathu			Short film	
	Trissoolam			Album	
	Piano			album	

=== Television ===
Year	Show	Role	Channel	Ref.
2011	Snehatheeram		DD Malayalam; Surya TV	
2011	Chila Nerangalil Chila Manushyar	Geethu	Amrita TV	
2011	Sooryakanthi		Jaihind TV	
2011-2012	Autograph	Priya	Asianet	
2011	Saivinte Makkal		Asianet	
	Kedharam			
2012	Kanamarayathu		Kairali TV	
2012-2014	Amma	Anu		
2012	Sreekrishnan		Surya TV	
2012-2013	Kathayariyathe		Surya TV	
2013-2014	Indira	Meera	Mazhavil Manorama	
2013	Pathinu Pathu		Mazhavil Manorama, Surya TV	
2013	Sparsham		Media One	
2015	Penmanassu	Amala	Surya TV	
2015-2016	Manassariyathe		Surya TV	
	Sandhya Vandanam			
2014-15	Aniyathi	Gayathri	Mazhavil Manorama	
2015-16	Ponnambili	Malavika	Mazhavil Manorama	
2015	Meghasandhesham		Kairali TV	
2017	Jagratha		Amrita TV	
2018 -2019	Arundhathi	Arundhathi	Flowers	

TV shows

Year	Show	Role	Channel	Notes
2013	Munch Stars	Contestant		Also anchor in curtain riser
	Badai Bungalow	TV Serial Actress	Asianet	
	Nammal Thammil	Panelist	Asianet	
2015-2019	Taste Time	Host	Asianet	
