= Sukhamo Devi (TV series) =

Indian Malayalam soap opera

- Genre: Drama
- Written by: Maya Karichal
- Directed by: Faisal Adimali
- Starring: Susmitha Prabhakaran; Aishwariyaa Bhaskaran
- Country of origin: India
- Original language: Malayalam
- No. of seasons: 1
- No. of episodes: 1000

Production
- Producer: Flowers TV
- Production location: Thiruvananthapuram, Kerala
- Production company: Silver Screen Studios Private Limited.

Original release
- Network: Flowers TV
- Release: 8 May 2023 – present

Sukhamo Devi is an Indian Malayalam-language soap opera directed by Faisal Adimali. It airs on Flowers TV from 8 May 2023. It stars Prayaan, Susmitha Prabhakaran and Aishwariyaa Bhaskaran in lead roles. The title of the series is adapted from 1986 Malayalam film Sukhamo Devi. It is one of the longest running Malayalam soap opera.

== Synopsis ==
Devika and Nandan loves each other. Nandan belongs to a rich family, Chandroth and Devika's parents are poor. They got married secretly. But due Nandan's fear on his family, he lied that his friend Murali married Devika. Murali's mother is a maid in Chandroth house. Murali's mother treats Devi badly and she took her to Chandroth as servant to help her. Devika stayed in Murali's house and suffers all the difficulties in hope to live peacefully with Nandan soon. Later, the family members realise about Devika' truth. Prabhavathi tries to remove Devika from Nandan's life by making him marry to Meera. Murali marries his lover Gouri. Nandan's sister Rajani is a victim of a broken marriage. The family plans to get Rajani married to Girish; her old lover to which Prabhavathi disagrees. Meanwhile, Girish's cousin Prakash Menon is a fraud film star who faked love towards Meera. Meera realising his true intentions stabbed him.

== Cast ==
- Susmitha Prabhakaran as Devika Nandan, former MLA, the main protagonist
- Aishwariyaa Bhaskaran as Chandroth Prabhavathi Sidharthan, Nandan's mother
- Prayaan Vishnu as Chandroth Nandan, Devika's husband (dead after Devika was forced to kill him)
- Vivek Gopan/ Stebin Jacob as Murali Chandroth, Nandan's friend, husband of Gouri and Bhargavi's son
- V.K.Baiju as Chandroth Siddharthan, Nandan and Rajani's father
- Amritha Prasanth as Rajani Gireesh, Nandan's elder sister, wife of Gireesh
- Priyanka Anoop as Bhargavi, Murali's mother and servant in Chandrothu
- Lakshmi Pramod / Aiswarya Unni as Meera Balaraman (dead), daughter of Balaraman and Nandan's former fiancee
- Deepan Murali as Prakash Menon, Meera's lover turned killer
- Bhagyalakshmi as Dr. Janaki
- Ibrahim Kutty as Hari; Janaki's husband, common friend of Siddharthan and Balaraman
- Ardra Das as Gouri Murali, Murali's wife
- Ramya Sudha as Radhika Madhavan; Devika and Shaari's Mother
- KPAC Saji as Balaraman; Meera and Tanuja's father (dead), husband of Chandramathi
- Manju Satheesh/Divya Sreedhar as Chandramathi Balaraman; Meera's mother, wife of Balaraman
- Harishanth as Thyagarajan; Chandramathi's Brother, a criminal politician
- Giridhar as Gireesh, Rajani's husband and Vasundhara's Best friend
- Reneesha Rahiman as Isabella, Nandan's former lover and friend.
- Ranjith Raj as Sethu; Nandan's friend
- Kishore Peethambaran as Karthikeyan, couzin of Devika, wanted criminal.
- Pavithran as Madhavan; Devika and Shaari's father
- Aiswarya Devi as Urmila; Murali's sister
- Kollam Thulasi as DGP Thomas Chacko IPS
- Vaishnavi Sai Kumar as Kalavathi, Prabhavathi's cousin
- Anu Joseph as SP Vasundhara IPS, Gireesh's friend
- Sujitha Stany as Thanuja; Balaraman and Mary's illegitimate daughter
- as Purushothaman; Thanuja's adopted father
- as Sujatha; Thanuja's adopted mother
- Maya Moushmi as Minister Mary Thomas; Tanuja's mother
- as Uma; Murali's sister
- as Giri's mother
- as Sharika Madhavan; Devika's sister
- as Vasudevan; Gouri's father
- as Varadha; Gouri's mother
- as Esthappan; a goon, friend of Devika
- as Nimmy; Esthappan's daughter
- as Eliyamma a.k.a Achaamma; Esthappan's helper
- Reshmi Boban as Arundhathi
- as Narendran; Rajani's first husband
- as Meenakshi; Chandroth house maid
- Sheelu Abraham

== Awards ==
Year	Award	Category	Recipient(s)	Result	Ref.
2025	3rd Kerala Vision Television Awards	Best Actor in Negative Role	Harisanth	Won	
2026	4th Kerala Vision Television Awards	Best Actress	Susmita Prabhakaran	Won	
