= Paavam Ganesan =

Indian television series

- Genre: Family drama
- Created by: Estrella Stories
- Written by: R. Girish Raganathan; S. Ramana Girisvan
- Directed by: S. Thai Selvam Ravi Priyan Neeravi Pandian
- Starring: Naveen Muralidhar; Neha Gowda
- Theme music composer: Ilayavan
- Country of origin: India
- Original language: Tamil
- No. of episodes: 517

Production
- Cinematography: Ramesh D.
- Running time: 22 minutes
- Production company: Fiction Team

Original release
- Network: Star Vijay
- Release: 4 January 2021 – 8 October 2022

Paavam Ganesan is a 2021 Indian-Tamil language family drama series, starring Naveen Muralidhar and Neha Gowda and airing on Star Vijay and is also available on the digital platform Disney+ Hotstar before the telecast. It premiered on 4 January 2021 and ended on 8 October 2022.

== Cast ==
=== Main ===
- Naveen Muralidhar as Ganesan (2021–2022)
  - Sornam's eldest son. Chitra's younger brother. Priya, Nithya and Baskar's elder brother; He takes care of his family after his father's demise. Guna's childhood friend and husband and Yamuna's former lover.
- Neha Gowda as Gunavathy a.k.a. "Guna " (2021–2022)
  - Eshwari's eldest daughter. Praveen and Srimathi's elder sister; Like Ganesan, she takes care of her family after her father's demise. Ganesan's considers her his best friend, but she has loved him one-sidedly for 15 years and married him.

=== Supporting ===
- Anila Sreekumar as Sornam (2021–2022)
  - Ganesan, Chitra, Priya, Nithya and Baskar's mother
- Meenakshi Muruha as Eswari (2021–2022)
  - Guna, Praveen and Srimathi's mother
- Karuna Vilasini / Latha Rao as Chithra Rangarajan (2021–2022)
  - Sornam's eldest daughter, Ganesan's elder sister and Rangarajan's wife
- Yuvanraj Nethrun as Rangarajan (2021–2022)
  - Chitra's husband. He hates Ganesan's family for being poor.
- Shimona Maria James as Priya (2021–2022)
  - Sornam's middle daughter, Ganesan's first younger sister and Sudhish's wife
- Jay Srinivas as Sudheesh (2021–2022)
  - Priya's husband
- Samyuthaa / VJ Thara as Nithya (2021–2022)
  - Sornam's younger daughter, Ganesan's younger sister and Praveen's wife
- Anand Pandi as Baskar (2021–2022)
  - Sornam's younger son, Ganesan, Chitra, Priya younger brother, Praveen's enemy also Srimathi's love interest
- Rajesh Sekhar as Praveen (2021–2022)
  - Eshwari's son, Guna's younger brother and Baskar's enemy, Nithya's husband
- Pranika as Srimathi (2021–2022)
  - Eshwari's younger daughter, Guna and Praveen's younger sister also Baskar's love interest
- Santhana Lakshmi as Bhutan Sundari, Sudheesh mother
- Dheeshanth as Lakshmi Narayanan, Nithya's friend
- Shayema Reyaldeen / Sivanya Priya as Yamuna Pandi
  - Ganesan's cousin also his former lover, Pandi's wife
- Karthik Shiva as Pandi, Yamuna's husband (2021)
- Ashok as Gopal, Yamuna father, Sornam's brother
- Sai Lakshmi as Yamuna's mother
- Shyam as Gowtham, Ganesan and Guna's friend
