= Ranjith Raj =

Indian actor

- Born: Kannur, Kerala, India
- Occupation: Actor
- Years active: 2004–2023
- Known for: Autograph
- Spouse: Dhanya (m. 2017)
- Children: 1

Ranjith Raj is an Indian actor, known for his work in Malayalam television soap operas and films. He is recognised for his role as James Albert in the Asianet teen drama serial Autograph (2009–2012).

== Early and personal life ==
Ranjith was born in the Kannur district of Kerala, India. His mother, Usha, was a former actress in the Malayalam film and television industry. He lost his father at the age of two. After studying marine technology, Ranjith worked in the merchant navy for few years before leaving the profession due to malaria.

Ranjith married Dhanya on 8 May 2017, and they have a daughter.

== Career ==
Ranjith's acting career began in 2004 with the Surya TV serial Kanyadhanam, in which he played the character Nandhu. His breakthrough came in 2009 with the portrayal of James Albert in the teen drama serial Autograph aired on Asianet. In addition to television, he acted in Malayalam films such as Akashangalil (2015), Ariyathe Ishtamai (2015), and Priyapettavar (2019).

== Filmography ==
=== Films ===
Year	Title	Role	Notes	Ref.
2015	Akashangalil	Leo		
2015	Ariyathe Ishtamai	Manu		
2019	Priyapettavar	Sudhi		

=== Television ===
Year(s)	Title	Role	Network	Notes	Ref.
2004	Kanyadhanam	Nandhu	Surya TV	Debut	
2008	Kudumbayogam	Cletus	Surya TV		
2009–2012	Autograph	James Albert	Asianet	Lead role	
2012	Sree Padmanabham	Rama	Amrita TV		
2012	Chandralekha	Soorya Prakash	Asianet	Lead role	
2012	Hridayam Sakshi	—	Mazhavil Manorama		
2014–2015	Aniyathi	Vinayan	Mazhavil Manorama		
2015	Meghasandesam	—	Kairali TV		
2016–2017	Mangalyapattu	Denny Mathew	Mazhavil Manorama		
2016–2018	Rathri Mazha	Saji	Flowers TV		
2017	Chempattu	Falgunan	Asianet		
2018–2020	Kasthooriman	Dhyan	Asianet		
2018	Makkal	Raj	Mazhavil Manorama		
2019–2020	Kabani	Varun	Zee Keralam		
2019–2020	Classmates	Sethu	Flowers TV		
2020–2021	Sathya Enna Penkutty	Abhijith	Zee Keralam		
2021	Ente Bharya	Rahul	Flowers TV	Lead role	
2021	Sasneham	Sajan	Asianet		
2022	Kaliveedu	Jeevan	Surya TV		
2023	Sukhamo Devi	Sethu	Flowers TV		
