= Sumangali Bhava =

Indian television series

- Also known as: സുമംഗലീ ഭവഃ
- Genre: Drama; Psychological thriller Romance; Soap opera
- Written by: Kishore Abraham
- Directed by: AM nazeer
- Starring: Richard; Sonu Ajayakumar
- Country of origin: India
- Original language: Malayalam
- No. of episodes: 375

Production
- Producer: Amizara Entertainments / Sudeep Karakkat
- Cinematography: Deepak Nair
- Editor: Unknown
- Camera setup: Multi-camera

Original release
- Network: Zee Keralam
- Release: 1 July 2019 – 24 January 2021

Related
- Tu Ashi Jawali Raha

Sumangali Bhava is a 2019 Indian Malayalam language psychological thriller television series which premiered from 1 July 2019 on Zee Keralam. It stars Darshana Das and Richard NJ in lead roles. The show is the official remake of Marathi TV series Tu Ashi Jawali Raha which was aired on Zee Yuva.

== Plot ==
Vaidehi, an independent girl, dreams of being married to a man who adores her. After she marries Suryanarayana Varma, she struggles to deal with her husband's obsessive love.

== Cast ==
=== Main ===
- Richard Jose as Suryanarayana Varma
- Darshana Das / Sonu Satheesh Kumar as Vaidehi (Devu) / Nimisha
- Keerthana Poduwal as Karthika

=== Recurring ===
- Spadikam George as Col. R V Thamburan
- Balachandran Chullikkadu as Varriyar
- Gayathri Varsha as Lalitha
- Divya Yeshodharan as Nila
- Deepan Murali as Sidharthan
- Prajusha as Meenakshi
- Amith as Ramachandran
- Rajeev Roshan
- Lakshmi Sanal as Ramachandran's wife
- Binu Dev as Vishwanthan
- Tanvi Raveendran as Varaprabha
- Vijayakumari as Maheshwari
- Sruthy Surendran (Manve) as Mayuri
- Pramod Mani as Bhadran
- Jaseela Parveen
- Sheela Sree
- Fawaz Zayani as Unni
- Kalamandalam Radhika as Vaidehi's grandmother
- Haridas as Niranjan
- Ardra Das
- Chandrasekhar Puthuserry
- Jayakrishnan Kichu as Niranjan
- Sadhika Venugopal
- Sindhu Jacob
- Poojappura Radhakrishnan as Vasudevan
- Ambika Mohan as Santhamma
- Mersheena Neenu as Sathya
- Nandhan Senanipuram as assistant photographer

== Adaptations ==
Language	Title	Original release	Network(s)	Last aired	Notes
Marathi	Tu Ashi Jawali Raha तू अशी जवळी राहा	1 October 2018	Zee Yuva	31 October 2019	Original
Malayalam	Sumangali Bhava സുമംഗലീ ഭവഃ	1 July 2019	Zee Keralam	24 January 2021	Remake
