= Autograph (TV series) =

Indian teen drama television series

- Season 1 title card
- Genre: Teen drama
- Written by: Anil Bass
- Directed by: Sujith Sunder
- Starring: Ranjith Raj; Sarath Kumar; Ambarish M. S.; Soniya Srijith; Sreekutty; Shaalin Zoya
- Opening theme: "Ormathan Thalile"
- Country of origin: India
- Original language: Malayalam
- No. of seasons: 2
- No. of episodes: 646

Production
- Producer: Ali Khan
- Production location: Kerala
- Cinematography: Manoj Kumar
- Editor: Joby Pannapara
- Running time: 18–20 minutes
- Production company: Bava Creations

Original release
- Network: Asianet
- Release: 5 October 2009 – 6 April 2012

Autograph is an Indian Malayalam-language teen drama television series that aired on Asianet from 5 October 2009 to 6 April 2012. The series delves into the high school and college lives of five close friends who are known as "Five Fingers" and explores themes of friendship and relationships.

At the 2011 Asianet Television Awards, it received several accolades, including Best Director (Sujith Sunder), Best Screenplay (Anil Bass), Best Editor (Joby Pannapara), Best New Face – Female (Shaalin Zoya), and Best Actress – Character (Sona Nair). The show was re-telecast on Asianet Plus during the 2020 COVID-19 lockdown, though it was quickly replaced by the Malayalam-dubbed Mahabharat (2013–2014).

== Plot ==
The first season centers on James, Rahul, Sam, Nancy, and Mridhula, a group of high school students known as Five Fingers. The story begins when Rahul and Mridhula witness a murder committed by businessman Chandra Kumar "C.K." and his henchman Stephen Gomez. At school, the group begins a rivalry with a new student, Deepa Rani, whose mother, Sethu Lekshmi, later becomes the principal. After vacation, Five Fingers are wrongfully accused of killing their schoolmate Rosy, but their innocence is proven when Stephen, the true culprit, is arrested with help from their friend Jyothi. Later, C.K. illegally releases Stephen, who—with Deepa's help—attempts to murder Mridhula but accidentally kills Jyothi. Concerned about legal consequences, Deepa turns against C.K., who then tries to kill her; however, Five Fingers manage to save her. She reveals the truth behind Jyothi's murder to the group, while James learns from Sethu Lekshmi that he is C.K.'s stepbrother. Meanwhile, C.K. enters a by-election and kills Stephen to safeguard his political reputation. During C.K.'s TV interview, Five Fingers manipulate the broadcast to expose him, resulting in his failure and arrest for Stephen's murder.

The second season is set in a law college, where Five Fingers—now with Deepa replacing Mridhula, who moves to the United States—gets involved in a series of conflicts with 4 the People, a gang of fifth-year LLB students led by Mahendran. Later, a new party is formed by Five Fingers, who go on to win the college union election, further escalating their rivalry with the gang. When rumors of an affair between his sister Priya and James surface, Mahendran forces her into an arranged marriage with his cousin Prakash Madhavan, a convicted criminal. However, the marriage is called off, and James's unexpected death impacts Deepa's mental health. She recovers with Dr. Premkumar's treatment and, alongside her friends, begins investigating the cause of James's death. However, when James, presumed dead, returns alive, Deepa is found missing, and C.K. emerges as the prime suspect. But, James and his friends discover that Deepa was kidnapped and murdered by Stephen, who was also presumed dead. After capturing James, Rahul, and Sam, Stephen holds them in his custody, but the trio manages to escape. The season concludes with C.K. killing both Stephen and his henchman Ram, after which James and his friends discontinue their course due to Deepa's absence.

== Cast ==
=== Main ===
- Ranjith Raj as James Albert, leader of Five Fingers group and the illegitimate son of the late businessman Nandha Gopala Menon. He is the stepbrother of Menon's elder son, Chandra Kumar "C.K.", and is raised by his mother, Leenamma, a quarry worker.
- Sarath Kumar as Rahul Krishnan, a member of Five Fingers and the son of an influential businessman who loses his mother at a young age. In the first season, Rahul's infatuation with Mridhula leads to multiple conflicts, including the temporary breakup of Five Fingers.
- Ambarish M. S. as Samkutty "Sam", one of the Five Fingers, often portrayed as a humorous character who values friendship. Orphaned at a young age, he is raised by his grandparents.
- Soniya Srijith (season 1) and Meghna Vincent (season 2) as Nancy Samuel, a Five Fingers member who spends most of the first season at the school and boarding premises due to her parents' separation. In the middle of the second season, she leaves for Kolkata to care for her father, whose health declines.
- Sreekutty as Mridhula "Mridhu" Menon (season 1), a member of Five Fingers and the daughter of Dr. Nirmala Prakash and Shivasankara Menon. At the end of the first season, Mridhula leaves for the United States to live with her mother, who suffers a stroke.
- Shaalin Zoya as Deepa Rani, daughter of Sethu Lekshmi and Prabhul Patel. Initially portrayed as Five Fingers' archrival in the first season, she later joins the group in the second season, replacing Mridhula Menon.

=== Recurring ===
- Sona Nair as Sethu Lekshmi, the school principal, Deepa's mother, the wife of Prabhul Patel, and a former criminal defense lawyer. She is featured prominently in the first season and makes a brief appearance in the second.
- Rajeev Parameshwar as Chandra Kumar "C.K.", a businessman and James's stepbrother. In the first season, C.K. is depicted as cruel and manipulative. However, his character undergoes a positive transformation in the second season, as he begins to accept James as a true brother.
- Binny George as Baby Clara.
- Kaviraj Achari as Stephen Gomez, the warden of the boys' boarding facility and C.K.'s henchman for most of the first season. In the second season, he is initially introduced under the alias "Mr. X," but is ultimately revealed to be Stephen Gomez, who emerges as the primary antagonist.
- Sreehari as Kuruvila (season 1), the school manager and Susanna's husband. After Stephen's arrest, he takes on the role of warden at the boys' boarding facility.
- Jayakumar Parameswaran Pillai as Sasi (season 1), peon of the school who is a well-wisher of Five Fingers.
- Jishin Mohan as Ram Narayanan, a student who is initially a friend of Five Fingers and Mridhula's love interest. In the second season, he allies with Stephen Gomez to seek revenge on Five Fingers, who are responsible for his arrest in a drug-related case.
- Niya Renjith and Swapna Treasa as Nandini (season 1), a teacher of morality and discipline, an out-of-syllabus subject. She is Deepan's love interest and relocates to Mumbai to join a new school around the middle of the first season.
- Amritha Prasanth as Jyothi Viswanath (season 1), a friend of Five Fingers who is murdered by Stephen Gomez in the girls' boarding facility, with Deepa's knowledge.
- Subhash Menon as CI Sarath Chandran ( season 1 ), an honest and sincere police officer who investigate Rosy's murder case & support five fingers
- Murali Mohan as Prabhul Patel IPS (season 1), the Commissioner of Police (CP), husband of Sethu Lekshmi, and father of Deepa Rani.
- Sarath Das as Deepan (season 1), a physics teacher who loves Nandini. Midway through the first season, he leaves the school to care for his mother, who is hospitalized after a head injury.
- Shiju AR as Devanarayanan IPS (season 1), a principled and disciplined police officer who is appointed as Police Commissioner following the deputation of Prabhul Patel.
- Nijash Jash as Ben Johnson (season 1), Deepa's close friend and a classmate of Five Fingers.
- Karishma Manoj as Rosy Wilfred (season 1), a student who is sexually abused and murdered by Stephen Gomez.
- Mahalakshmi as Nandana (season 1), a student who initially supports Deepa when Five Fingers are accused of Rosy's murder.
- S. Vijayakumari as Rajamma (season 1), the matron of the girls' boarding facility.
- Devan as P. Sethuramayyer (season 1), the school's initial principal, who is later succeeded by Sethu Lekshmi.
- Reshmi Boban and Karthika Kannan as Susanna (season 1), a school librarian and Kuruvila's wife, portrayed as a cunning and selfish woman.
- Kishore N. K. as Gupthan, a deceptive yet innocent person who fools others for money to support his daily needs. He is a helper to Five Fingers during their vacation periods.
- Vipiyan James as Mahendran "Mahi" (season 2), the leader of 4 the People, a gang of fifth-year LLB students; the son of Narendra Nath, a businessman, and the brother of Priya.
- Sree Lakshmi as Sony Wilfred (season 2), a member of 4 the People and the daughter of Wilfred D'Souza, a liquor businessman.
- Mahesh Lakshman as Ashok Raj (season 2), a member of 4 the People and the son of Rajan Thoma, a Member of Parliament (MP).
- Rishi Baaskaran as Bilal Ahmad (season 2), a member of 4 the People and the son of Ahmad, a business magnate.
- Meera Muralidharan as Priya (season 2), an LLB student who is Mahendran's sister and Subramani's love interest.
- Sandeep Sivan as Subramani (season 2), a third-year LLB student and Priya's love interest, who is also a friend of Five Fingers.
- Shari Krishnan as Sandra Viswanath (season 2), an LLB student and Jyothi Viswanath's sister, who joins 4 the People in pursuit of vengeance against Five Fingers for Jyothi's murder.
- Kailas Nath as Poduval (season 2), a professor who becomes the principal of the law college when Gayathri Devi takes a long leave.
- Amal as Christopher "Christy" (season 2), an Assistant Commissioner of Police (ACP) and Maggie's foster son. He is a constant rival to Five Fingers throughout the second season.
- Yadu Krishnan as Dr. Premkumar (season 2), a psychiatrist who treats Deepa after James's sudden death impacts her mental stability.
- Sreelatha Namboothiri as Maggie (season 2), widow of the late Nicholas, a former mayor. During their college days, Five Fingers stay as paying guests at her house.
- Senthil Krishna as V. D. Purushothaman "Purushu" (season 2), a friend of Gupthan who arranges accommodation for Five Fingers at Maggie's house.
- Anand Kumar as Prof. Dr. Sreekanth (season 2), the principal of the law college.
- Kavitha Nair as Gayathri Devi (season 2), the principal of the law college who replaces Prof. Dr. Sreekanth. Her character makes only a brief appearance in the second season as she departs for Chennai for her father's treatment.

=== Guest ===
- Rekha Ratheesh as Dr. Nirmala Prakash (season 1), Mridhula's mother, who is settled in the USA.
- Rajesh Hebbar as Dr. Syamaprasad, a psychiatrist who treats Deepa.
- Beena Antony as Leenamma (season 1), James's mother, who works at a quarry.
- Geetha Salam as Ramettan (season 1), Rahul's local guardian.
- G. K. Pillai as Vakkachan (season 1), Sam's grandfather.
