= Ponni (TV series) =

- Genre: Family; Drama
- Written by: Sridharan K.A. Vijayan; Yasir; Dialogue; Sivaram Kumar; Santham George
- Screenplay by: Vijayan Rajesh (Episode 1-165); Priya Thambi (Episode 166-663)
- Directed by: M Manoj Kumar (Episode 1-540); Neeravi Pandian (Episode 541-663)
- Starring: Vaishnavi Sundar; Sabari Nathan
- Theme music composer: Ilayavannan
- Opening theme: Ponniyn Thirumurga by Sai Vignesh and Surmukhi Raman
- Country of origin: India
- Original language: Tamil
- No. of seasons: 1
- No. of episodes: 663

Production
- Producer: Sivakanth
- Editor: Tamil Selvan
- Camera setup: Multi-camera
- Running time: approx.20-22 minutes per episode
- Production company: Kanaa Productions

Original release
- Network: Star Vijay
- Release: 27 March 2023 – 7 June 2025

Ponni is a 2023 Indian Tamil-language drama television series starring Vaishnavi Sundar, Sabari Nathan, Supergood Kannan and Reehana B and director by Manoj Kumar. The story is about a young woman named Ponni who is compelled to wed Shakthi. It describes how Sakthivel will accept her as a wife despite the fact that she has also faced challenges and sufferings.

It premiered on Star Vijay on 27 March 2023 and ended with 663 episodes on 7 June 2025. And available on the digital platform Disney+ Hotstar.

== Synopsis ==
The story revolves around Ponni and her father, focusing on the deep love Ponni feels for her father, who is seriously ill. To take care of him, she decides to arrange her own marriage. Ponni’s mother died when she was young, so she has always been the main person looking after her father.

At the same time, we meet Sakthi and his family, who are well-known in their town for their devotion to the god Murugan and their beautiful chants during important events. Ponni and Sakthi are childhood friends, but they face pressure from society to marry according to tradition. Determined to make her own choice, Ponni disguises herself as a maid and joins Sakthi's household, where a mix of complicated relationships and love stories begin to unfold.

Sakthi is in love with two women, Preethi and Vennila. Eventually, he decides to marry, but things get complicated. Preethi leaves after her father insists on the dowry system, and Vennila also leaves when Sakthi admits he doesn't love her. Ponni, pushed into an unusual marriage, faces many challenges but handles them with strength, growing closer to Sakthi.

Sakthi's father, Chandrasekar, realizes Ponni’s situation and accepts her as part of the family. The family struggles with societal judgment, especially since people misunderstand Ponni because of her background and appearance.

Shivani, someone Ponni helped succeed, is incredibly grateful and becomes a key player in bringing Ponni and Sakthi together. Even though Sakthi doesn’t seem to care much at first, Shivani works behind the scenes to help Ponni find her place within the family.

The story reaches its emotional peak during a wedding celebration, where Sakthi is distracted and ends up rejecting Shivani. At the same time, Jeyalakshmi, who has to conduct the rituals alone because Ponni’s father is ill, faces her own set of difficulties. The heart of the story is about Ponni's journey to get married, overcoming societal obstacles, and finally gaining the approval of Jeyalakshmi, making for an emotionally charged and powerful ending.

== Cast ==
=== Main ===
- Vaishnavi Sundar as Ponni
- Sabari Nathan as Sakthivel "Sakthi"

=== Recurring ===
- Shamitha Shreekumar (2023)/ Sindhujaa Vijii (2023-2024)/ Reehana B (Jul.2024-2025) as Jayalakshmi "Jaya"
- Supergood Kannan as Chandrasekar
- Azhagu (2023)/Vincent Roy (2025) as Muthaiah
- Varun Udhai as Sundaram (Antagonist)
- Janane Prabhu as Bhavani
- Baby Vedhasya as Shivani
- Karthik Sasidharan as Shanmugam
- Sridevi Ashok as Usha (Antagonist turns Protagonist)
- Shiyara Sharmi (2023)/ Jayashri Jue (2023-2024)/ Kadhanayagi Pavithra (Oct.2024-2025) as Vennila (Main Antagonist)
- Tharshika (2023-2024)/ Sanjana Mani (Oct.2024-2025) as Preethi
- Sai Gopi as Muthukaalai (Antagonist)
- K. S. G. Venkatesh as Govindarajan (Antagonist)
- Maaran Chandrasekaran as ACP Kailash Tuyanathan (Antagonist)
- Mohan Vaidya as Thuyanathan (Antagonist)
- Jayashree Binuraj as Vijaya (Antagonist)
- Sethu Subbu as Vaithiyalingam (Antagonist)
- Babitha Jose as Usha's mother
- Sasindhar Pushpalingam as Victor (Antagonist)
- VJ Mohammed Azharuddin as Karthik
- Yuvanraj Nethrun as Moorthy (Antagonist) *died in 2024
- Praveen Devasagayam as Muthukaalai's henchman (Antagonist)

=== Special appearances ===
- Vetri Vasanth as Muthu (2024).
- Gomathi Priya as Meena, (2024).
- Meera Krishna as Rajaamani Ponni's mother (dead, photogenic appearance)

== Production ==
=== Casting ===
Vaishu Sundar was cast as Ponni by making this her first lead role. Initially, Sameer Ahamathu was chosen to play male leads but he declined, as he got an offer to act in Modhalum Kaadhalum. Later, Sabari Nathan plays the male lead alongside her. Shamitha Shreekumar was selected to portray the role of Jayalakshmi (Sakthivel's mother) who played an Main role, but in November 2023 she quit the series, and it was replaced by Actress Sindhu. It also marks Shamitha Shreekumar, who was last seen in Mouna Raagam season 1 on the same channel, was cast after a lengthy absence. However In 2 July 2024, Sindhu was replaced by Reehana who was cast to play the role of Jayalakshmi.

In October 2023, Shiyara Sharmi was replaced by Jayashri Jue who was cast to play the role of Vennila. In 26 January 2024, actor Vetri Vasanth was cast as special Appearances. In June 2024, singer and actor Mohan Vaidya was cast as Thuyanathan in special Appearances. In same month, anchor Azhar was cast as Karthik.

== Release ==
It began airing on Star Vijay starting 27 March 2023, replacing Namma Veetu Ponnu.
