= Senri Kawaguchi =

Japanese jazz and fusion drummer (born 1997)

Senri Kawaguchi 川口 千里
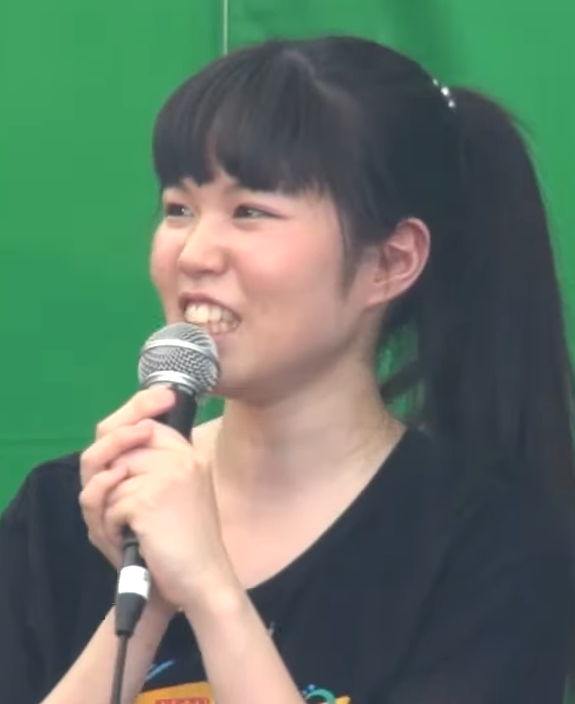
- Kawaguchi in 2019

Background information
- Also known as: 手数姫 (Tekazuhime)
- Born: 川口 千里 (Kawaguchi Senri); 8 January 1997 (age 29); Nagoya, Japan
- Genre: Jazz fusion
- Instrument: Drums
- Years active: 2009–present
- Labels: Most Company, VEGA Music Entertainment, King Records (Japan)
- Website: www.senridrums.com

Senri Kawaguchi (川口 千里, Kawaguchi Senri) is a Japanese drummer. In Japan, she is sometimes known as tekazuhime (手数姫), ("Princess of Many Strokes"). She has the image of a gecko on the front of her 20-inch bass drum, and on her Zildjian drumsticks. She has won many awards for her drumming.

== Early life ==
Kawaguchi was born in a suburb of Nagoya, Aichi Prefecture on 8 January 1997; and when she was still very young, she moved with her family to Yokkaichi in neighbouring Mie Prefecture.

She was introduced to drumming at the age of five when her father, a practicing doctor whom she described in an interview as a mecha-otaku (メカオタク), brought home an electronic drum kit so that he could explore its inner workings. Eventually, he gave it to her to play with, and at the age of six, she began taking drum lessons locally. When she was eight years old her teacher recommended that, having shown sufficient interest and talent, she started taking lessons from the renowned Japanese drummer and drum instructor Kozo Suganuma.

Under Suganuma's tutelage, Kawaguchi's skills developed, and soon she was accompanying professional musicians. In 2009, she made her first DVD, Horoscope with Suganuma and members of the Japanese fusion band Fragile. Later that year, after starting junior high school, she began making appearances at a number of small venues, as Senri's Super Session with Akira Tanemura on guitar, Teruyuki Iwawaki on bass and Mayumi Yoshida on keyboard, and with whom she still performs; and, between 2011 and 2014, as Senri's BeeHive Session at the BeeHive in Osaka—playing with a number of top Japanese rock and fusion jazz musicians, including Kyoji Yamamoto, Minoru Mukaiya, and Tetsuo Sakurai. Videos from many of these performances, were posted to a YouTube account set up in her name, along with videos in which she performed to the accompaniment of music from the anime K-On, bringing her to a much wider audience.

In 2010, at the age of 13, she became one of the youngest drummers, and, at that time, only the second Japanese drummer after Akira Jimbo to be added to the Drummerworld list of top 500 drummers.

== Career ==
In 2011, as well as continuing session work, she made her first overseas trip as a drummer when Yamaha Drums invited her to showcase some of their new drum kits at the 2011 Winter NAMM Show in Anaheim, California. Later in the year, she travelled with Yamaha to China, to participate in the 2011 Tianjin Jiutai International Drum Festival.

In 2012, she made her first national television appearance when, along with the members of Senri’s Super Session, she accompanied guitarist Kyoji Yamamoto at that year's Tokyo Crossover Night International Jazz Festival, which was broadcast by Fuji Television on their satellite channel.

On her 16th birthday in January 2013, she released her first solo album A la Mode. There she was accompanied by a number of Japanese musicians, including some that she had performed with in her BeeHive Sessions. Later that year, she travelled to the Hua Hin Jazz Festival, where she performed with Jun Abe, Shingo Tanaka, the bassist of fusion jazz band T-Square, and Kay-Ta Matsuno. Towards the end of the year, she began a collaboration with Kiyomi Otaka the keyboard player from Casiopea 3rd, forming the fusion duo Kiyo*Sen. They released their first album Chocolate Booster in January 2014. The release of this album was followed up with a short tour later in the year.

At the beginning of 2014, she went to Los Angeles to record her second solo album, Buena Vista. There, she met French smooth jazz and new-age music multi-instrumentalist Philippe Saisse, with whom she continues to work. She was also invited to be one of the international judges for the 2014 Hit Like a Girl drum competition, and has been a regular judge since then. Later in the year, she became involved in idol group E-Girls' tour of Japan, joining their support group as the drummer, giving her her first experience of performing at larger venues, including Tokyo's Budokan. Finally, in September, she made her first appearance at the Tokyo Jazz Festival.

In April 2015, after graduating from senior high school, she moved to Tokyo to study social science at Waseda University. While studying at university she continued her session and studio work. In June that year, Kiyo*Sen released their second album Duology and followed it up with a short tour publicising the release. In August, she travelled to the 2015 Rock au château festival held in the grounds of the château de Villersexel in France. In September, she performed at the Super Mario 30th Anniversary Concert in Tokyo. She also became more in demand to work with other artists, either in concert, or as a session artist on albums, notably being invited to perform with Guthrie Govan on the Japanese leg of his Erotic Cakes tour at the end of 2015. She would work again with Govan, a year later, at the end of 2016.

In 2016, she released 3 albums: KKK Core, a collaboration between Kawaguchi, Kozo Suganuma and Kaori Hirohara that they had worked on since the previous year; Trick or Treat, her third album as part of Kiyo*Sen, and Cider Hard and Sweet, a collaboration with Philippe Saisse and the bassist Armand Sabal-Lecco.

Throughout 2017, she participated in events to promote Yamaha Drum's 50th anniversary—culminating in a concert on stage with Dave Weckl, Steve Gadd, and Akira Jimbo on 2 September. Artists that she worked with in 2017 included Bootsy Collins on his album World Wide Funk, which was released in October 2017 and Jan Erling Holberg, with whom she worked on the single Aim to Please. In September 2017 she performed with Saisse and Sabal-Lecco for a televised performance at the 2017 Tokyo Jazz Festival at NHK Hall, after which they performed at various venues, including Motion Blue in Tokyo, which was recorded and released as a DVD and Blu-ray, and for which they won the Nissan Jazz Japan Award 2017 for Best Live Performance. In September, she began performing with one of Japan's leading jazz orchestras, Eric Miyashiro's Blue Note Tokyo All-Star Jazz Orchestra. In October 2017, she travelled to Bengaluru where she participated in the 2017 October Octaves with Indian fusion violinist Abhijith PS Nair.

In 2019, she graduated from Waseda University. Also in 2019, she was invited by Jun Abe to join a band which he was setting up combining traditional Japanese instruments with modern ones. In 2021, it was announced that the band would be named ZAON (坐音).

In 2020, she played drums as a guest player for single album Ritual iDance of London-based Swedish progressive rock and jazz pianist Anders Helmerson.

In 2021, she led a performance on the rooftop of the Andaz Tokyo Toranomon Hills with seven other young Japanese performers for the closing ceremony of One Young World Munich 2021. A film "Senri's Seven", directed by Lilou Augier was made about preparations for this performance; it included some music from the actual performance. They also performed as "The Jazz Avengers" at Billboard Live YOKOHAMA and Billboard Live OSAKA. In 2023, the Jazz Avengers announced their first album and release tour on their YouTube channel.

On February 26, 2025, The Jazz Avengers announced their hiatus starting May 2, 2025 on their website.

Since 2022, she has been playing with bassist Masatoshi Mizuno and guitarist Shoya Kitagawa in the jazz fusion band Nankai TRIO. They released their first album, Antarctica, in April 2025.

== Discography ==
=== Solo recordings ===
Albums

- A La Mode - Most Company, VEGA Music Entertainment – MOCA-1844. Released 8 January 2013.
- Buena Vista - Most Company, VEGA Music Entertainment – MOCA-1846. Released 4 June 2014.
- Cider Hard & Sweet - King Record Co. Ltd – KICJ-758. Released 21 Dec 2016. It is regarded as her major label debut.
- Dynamogenic - King Record Co. Ltd – KICJ-842. Released 23 Dec 2020.
- E-Magination -Live At Blues Alley Japan- - King Record Co. Ltd – KICJ-886. Released 26 August 2026.

DVD and Blu-ray

- Horoscope - Jewel Sound – JSSK-9. Released 6 February 2009
- Senri Kawaguchi LIVE Tour 2014 "Buena Vista" - Most Company, VEGA Music Entertainment – MODA-2601. Released 4 April 2015.
- Senri Kawaguchi TRIANGLE Live in Yokohama 2017 - King Record Co. Ltd – KIXM-305. Released 27 December 2017.

=== Recordings as part of Kiyo*Sen ===
Albums

- Chocolate Booster - VEGA Music Entertainment – VGDBRZ-0053. Released 18 January 2014.
- Duology - VEGA Music Entertainment – VGDBRZ-0060. Released 24 June 2015.
- Trick or Treat - VEGA Music Entertainment – VGDBRZ-0065. Released 2 September 2016.
- Organiser - Elec Records – ELFA-1816. Released 4 July 2018.
- Drumatica - airgroove LLC & Elec Records – YZAG-1105. Released 6 November 2019.

DVD and Blu-ray

- ChocoーBoo Live! - VEGA Music Entertainment – VGVJFZ-0005. Released 26 April 2014.
- Another Live World - Alfanote - AND075. Released 4 July 2018.

=== Recordings with the Jazz Avengers ===
Albums

- The Jazz Avengers - Elec Records - YZAG-1115. Released 26 April 2023.
- 8 Step - Elec Records - YZAG-1121. Released 8 May 2024.

=== Recordings with Nankai TRIO ===
Albums

- Antarctica - A=tonal – ATML-0001. Released 23 April 2025.

=== Other recordings ===
Albums

- KKK-Core - VEGA Music Entertainment – VGDBRZ-0064. Released 28 January 2016.

=== Recordings about Senri Kawaguchi ===
DVD and Blu-ray

- Senri Kawaguchi from 18 to 20 (川口千里 密着age18-20〜千里の道も一歩から メジャーの先へ〜) - Alfanote – AND073. Released 9 September 2017

Note: All release dates, labels and catalogue numbers are for the original Japanese release.
