= Mannan Magal (TV series) =

- மன்னன் மகள்
- Genre: Soap opera Thriller
- Written by: Manikandan
- Screenplay by: Shanmugam
- Directed by: Yogam Ravi
- Starring: Madhumitha; Sarath Babu; Yuvarani; Udhay
- Theme music composer: Hari
- Country of origin: India
- Original language: Tamil
- No. of seasons: 1
- No. of episodes: 253

Production
- Producer: R. Sathish Kumar
- Camera setup: Multi-camera
- Running time: approx. 20-22 minutes per episode
- Production company: Citram Screens

Original release
- Network: Jaya TV
- Release: 17 February 2014 – 17 February 2015

Mannan Magal (Tamil: மன்னன் மகள்) is an Indian Tamil-language thriller soap opera aired on Jaya TV. The show premiered on 17 February 2014 and aired Monday through Friday at 8:30 pm IST. A new show named Akka replaced this show at 8:30PM and pushed this serial to 9:30PM IST instead since 15 September 2014. The show stars Madhumitha, Chitra, Sarath Babu and Yuvarani. The show was ended on 17 February 2015 and with 253 episodes.

== Plot ==
This is a story of Vishali (Madhumitha), a Chennai girl, and the problems she faces in her family and office. Her boss believes that Vishali is in disguise and is not just a working-Chennai girl, but the princess of Paandiyaapuram! Thaayamma, the princess of Paandiyaapuram, is very kind hearted, yet brave woman, who cares about the welfare of people of Paandiyaapuram. Her father is (Sarath Babu) Andavaar, the Zamindar of Paandiyaapuram, he is a wise man, he considers the welfare of the people and helps the necessitous. His second wife (Yuvarani) is a greedy woman; she doesn't like him wasting his wealth in such ways, and she has a servant who helps her in the plotting against her enemies.

== Cast ==
- Madhumitha/ Chitra Kamaraj as Vishali
- Sarath Babu as Andavaar
- Yuvarani
- R. Ravi
- Udhay
- Yuvanraj Nethrun
- K. S. Jayalakshmi
- Mahalakshmi
- Azhagu
- Sonia
