= Shaalin Zoya =

Indian actress and director

- Born: Malappuram, Kerala, India
- Other name: Shalu
- Occupation: Actress
- Years active: 2004–present
- Known for: Autograph

Shaalin Zoya is an Indian actress, dancer and director who works in Malayalam and Tamil films and television. She is best known for playing the negative role of Deepa Rani in Asianet TV's soap opera Autograph (2009–2012) and a supporting role of Jessy in Elsamma Enna Aankutty (2010).

== Early life ==
Shaalin Zoya hails from Tirur, Malappuram, Kerala. Her father is a businessman. Her mother, a dance teacher, encouraged her to pick up a career in acting.

== Personal life ==
Zoya dated YouTuber TTF Vasan for a while.

== Filmography ==
=== As actor ===
Year	Title	Role	Language	Notes	Ref.
2004	Quotation	–	Malayalam		
2006	Out of Syllabus	Jr. Gayathri	Malayalam		
2006	Oruvan	Remyamol	Malayalam		
2006	The Don	Kulsu	Malayalam		
2006	Vaasthavam	Jr. Sumithra	Malayalam		
2007	Soorya Kireedam	Jr. Urmila	Malayalam		
2008	Oridathoru Puzhayundu	–	Malayalam		
2010	Elsamma Enna Aankutty	Jessy	Malayalam		
2011	Swapna Sanchari	Sreekutty Raveendran	Malayalam		
2011	Manikyakkallu	Mubeena	Malayalam		
2012	Mallu Singh	Nithya	Malayalam		
2012	Karmayodha	Devika (Devootty)	Malayalam		
2013	Arikil Oraal	Gayathri	Malayalam		
2013	Rebecca Uthup Kizhakkemala	Chinnamma	Malayalam		
2013	Vishudhan	Annie Mol	Malayalam		
2013	Good Idea	–	Malayalam		
2015	Jaadayum Mudiyum	Aparna Nair	Malayalam	Short film	
2015	Rock Star	Singer	Malayalam		
2016	Raja Manthiri	Subha	Tamil		
2016	Koppayile Kodumkattu	Arya	Malayalam		
2016	Zita	Herself	Malayalam	Short film	
2018	Drama	Jessy	Malayalam		
2019	The Phantom Reef	Lady	English	Short film	
2020	Ruhaani	Lady	English	Short film	
2020	Dhamaka	Pinky	Malayalam		
2021	Thala	Manikutty	Malayalam		
2023	Kannagi	Nadhi	Tamil		
2024	Nagendran's Honeymoons	Rosey	Malayalam		

== Television career ==
- All TV shows and serials are in Malayalam language unless otherwise noted

Year	Title	Role	Language	Notes
2004	Mizhi Thurakkumbol		Surya TV	Serial
2005	Mandrake		Asianet	Serial
2007	Just for Kids	Host	Kiran TV	
2008	Hello Mayavi		Surya TV	Serial
2009	Kudumbayogam	Alona	Surya TV	Serial
2009	Madakkayathra		Amrita TV	Telefilm
2009	Gajarajan Guruvayoorappan	Nanikutty	Surya TV	Serial
2010	Mattoruval	Yamuna	Surya TV	Serial
2009–2012	Autograph	Deeparani	Asianet	Serial
2010	Adhiparasakthi		Surya TV	Serial
2011	Suryakanthi		Jaihind TV	Serial
2012	Palpayasavumayi Paramparasundarimar	Host	Mazhavil Manorama	
2016	Action Khilladi	Host	Kairali TV	
2016	Super Star Junior	Host	Amrita TV	Reality show
2017	Kuttikalodano Kali	Participant	Mazhavil Manorama	
2019	Page 3	Model	Kappa TV	
2022	Red Carpet	Mentor; Dancer	Amrita TV	
2024	Cooku with Comali season 5	Contestant	Star Vijay	Tamil show Finalist
2025—present	Samayal Express season 2	Host	Zee Tamil	Tamil show
2026	Cooku with Comali season 7	Host	Star Vijay	Tamil show

== Awards ==
- 2011 - Asianet Ayucare Television Award - Best New Face of the year (for TV soap opera Autograph)
- 2011 - Kazhcha Television Award - Best Performer - Female (for TV serial Autograph)
- Vayalar Award for Best Child Artist (for film Elsamma Enna Aankutty)
