= Sonu Satheesh Kumar =

Indian actress and classical dancer

- Born: India
- Occupations: Actress, dancer, television host, choreographer
- Years active: 2007–2020
- Spouse: Ajay (m. 2017)
- Parent(s): Satheesh, Sreekala

Sonu Satheesh Kumar better known by her screen name Sonu, is an Indian actress and classical dancer acting mainly in Malayalam and Tamil television serials. The TV show Vaalkkannadi rose her to fame and popularity. She is known for her roles in Sthreedhanam and Anbe Vaa.

She is a well trained Bharatanatyam and Kuchipudi dancer who has performed in several dance shows including Nishagandhi festival 2017. She hold Master's in Kuchipudi and diploma in Bharatanatyam and also conducts several dance workshops.

== Biography ==
She is trained under Geetha Padmakumar, Parvathy Sasidharan and Job Thrissur in Bharatanatyam, Kuchipudi and Folk. She holds MA in Kuchipudi, Diploma in Bharatanatyam and currently pursuing doctoral degree in Kuchipudi. She has cleared UGC NET exam and is currently teaching in Sai Shivam School of Dance. She married IT engineer Ajay in 2017 at Guruvayur.

Starting her career as a television host she made her debut through popular Malayalam serial Sreeguruvayurappan and made her debut as a lead in Tamil serial Anbe Vaa. Her performance as the wicked vamp in the popular serial Sthreedhanam on Asianet made her a known figure on Malayalam TV. She also participated in a reality show Sundari Neeyum Sundaran Njaanum along with Rajesh Hebbar on Asianet.She has done a cameo appearance in 2 Harihar Nagar. She then appeared in a short film ; God Bless Nithya.

== Filmography ==
Television career

Year	Title	Channel	Role	Language	Notes
2005	Valkannadi	Asianet	Host	Malayalam	TV show
2006	Super Dancer	Amrita TV	Contestant	Malayalam	Reality show
2007	Madhavam	Surya TV		Malayalam	Television debut
2007	Sreeguruvayoorappan	Surya TV	Parvathy	Malayalam	
2008	Hello Kuttichathan	Asianet	Swetha Nambiar	Malayalam	
2008	Thulabharam	Surya TV		Malayalam	
	Kanal Kannadi			Malayalam	
2009	Akkare Ikkare	Asianet		Malayalam	
2009–2010	Anbe Vaa	Vijay TV	Santhiya	Tamil	
2009-2012	Chakkarabharani	Surya TV	Durga	Malayalam	
2011-2012	Dosth	Kairali TV		Malayalam	
2012	Nizhalkannadi	Surya TV	Anjana	Malayalam	
2012	Manasaveena	Mazhavil Manorama	Kaveri	Malayalam	
2012	Kanalppoovu	Jeevan TV	Sandra Sekhar	Malayalam	
2012	Sreepadmanabham	Amrita TV		Malayalam	
	Arabian Sukumaran Speaking	Asianet	Bhavana	Malayalam	
2012–2016	Sthreedhanam	Asianet	Veni	Malayalam	
2013	Sundari Neeyum Sundaran Njaanum	Asianet	Contestant	Malayalam	Winner along with Rajesh Hebbar
2013	Munch Stars	Asianet	Contestant	Malayalam	
2013	Vamsam	Sun TV		Tamil	
2015	Salmath Cafe	Kairali TV		Malayalam	
2015	Asianet Comedy Awards	Asianet	Performer	Malayalam	
2016	Super Challenge	Surya TV	Participant	Malayalam	
2016-2017	Bharya	Asianet	Rohini	Malayalam	Replaced by Mridula Vijay
2017–2019	Mahalakshmi	Sun TV	Ramya	Tamil	
2018	Agnisakshi	Surya TV	Indraja Varma	Malayalam	
2018	Police	ACV		Malayalam	
2019	Azhagu	Sun TV	Priya Sundaram	Tamil	
2019–2021	Sumangali Bhava	Zee Keralam	Vaidehi/Devu/Nimisha	Malayalam	Replaced Darshana Das
2020	Karthika Deepam	Zee Keralam	Devu	Malayalam	Cameo in promo
2020	Kaiyethum Doorath	Zee Keralam	Devi	Malayalam	Cameo in promo
