= Abhijith P. S. Nair =

Indian violinist, arranger and composer (born 1991)

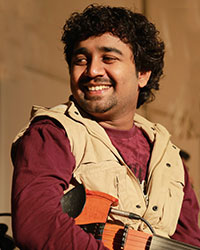
- Abhijith P. S. Nair performing at a stage show

Background information
- Born: Abhijith P. S. Nair; 18 October 1991 (age 35); Vaikom, Kerala, India
- Genres: Classical music Indian music World music
- Occupation: Musician
- Years active: 2004–present
- Website: abhijithpsnair.com

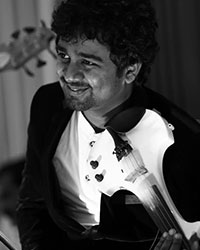
Abhijith P. S. Nair Performing with Violin

Abhijith P. S. Nair (born 18 October 1991) is an Indian violinist, arranger and composer.

== Performing career ==
Abhijith became acquainted with folk and classical styles and began performing onstage improvisations. His fusion violin shows and albums gained him popularity.

He has performed with various artists including Dr. K. J. Yesudas, Hariharan, Shankar Mahadevan, Sivamani, Mandolin U. Rajesh, Mattannoor Sankarankutty Marar, Stephen Devassy, Senri Kawaguchi and Mohini Dey. For his first international instrumental jazz fusion album Saraswati At Montreux, he collaborated with drummer Dave Weckl. Abhijith is the worldwide ambassador of Cantini violin.

== Works ==
Name	Year	Genre
Akashangalil	2015	Malayalam movie
Behind You	2016	World fusion album
Saraswati At Montreux	2016	Jazz Fusion Album
Ekalavya	2016	Jazz Fusion Album
