= Thai Veedu (TV series) =

- Genre: Soap opera Family
- Created by: Mangai Arirajan
- Based on: Original
- Written by: Mangai Harirajan
- Directed by: Mangai Harirajan
- Starring: Sanghavi; Ranjit babu; Vishwa; Karna; J. Lalitha
- Theme music composer: S.P Pupathi
- Country of origin: India
- Original language: Tamil
- No. of episodes: 134

Production
- Producer: Mangai Harirajan
- Editor: Uma Sankar Babu
- Camera setup: Multi-camera
- Running time: 22–24 minutes
- Production company: Mangai Entertainments

Original release
- Network: Vendhar TV
- Release: 23 October 2017 – 27 April 2018

Thai Veedu is a 2017-2018 Tamil-language family drama starring Sanghavi, Vishwa, Karna and J. Lalitha. It started aired on Vendhar TV from 23 October 2017 to 27 April 2018 on every Monday to Friday for 134 Episodes. The show is produced, Story and directed by Mangai Harirajan.

== Plot ==
Police officer Durga discovers the bitter truth about her father's death. She decides to bring justice as well teach a lesson to her arrogant uncles, who had brutally murdered her father.

== Cast ==
- Sanghavi as Durga: An elder daughter of Meenakshi and police officer. She fights for their mother's rights and returns to the village.
- J. Lalitha as Meenakshi: A widow and Durga and Shalini's mother. She eloped with one of the workers and gets married. They have two daughters. But the family finds and kills her husband, and starts looking for their daughter and her kids, too.
- Vishwa as Chinnathurai
- Karna
- Poomika as Shalini
- C. Ranganathan
- Vijayalakshmi
- Uma Sankar Babu
- Vetri
- Jayagi
- Kosava
- Sathya
- Mithun
- Manikandan
- Ranjith
- Piraksh
- Parthasarathy

== International broadcast ==
The series was released on 23 October 2017 on Vendhar TV. The show was also broadcast internationally on the channel's international distribution.

- It aired Sri Lanka, Singapore and Malaysia on Vendhar TV.
- The United States, Europe, North America and Canada on ATN Tamil Plus on Monday to Friday at 20:00. After original telecast.
