= Pattu Saree =

- Genre: Drama
- Story by: Sarjulan
- Directed by: AM Nazeer
- Starring: See below
- Music by: Vishwajith
- Country of origin: India
- Original language: Malayalam

Production
- Producer: Arun Pillai
- Production location: Kuttanad
- Editor: Pradeep Abhedanandapuram
- Camera setup: Multi-camera
- Running time: 22 minutes approx
- Production company: NAP Communications

Original release
- Network: Mazhavil Manorama
- Release: 3 December 2012 – 12 July 2014

Pattu Saree (transl. Silk Saree) was a Malayalam soap opera which launched on Mazhavil Manorama. Sadhika Venugopal played the protagonist of the show.

== Plot ==
Pattu Saree depicts the life of Kanchi, a self-made business woman who owns a silk saree showroom. She adopts a son, believing her twin daughters were killed in a car accident. However, one of her daughters became a sales girl in her shop and later fell in love with her adopted son to marry him. However, Kanchi is not fond of this girl, Thamara, until she realizes and recognizes her to be her daughter. This happens when her husband rejoins the family, against the will of Kanchi, her mother and her prospective husband. Kanchi has serious ill feelings toward her husband, whom she holds responsible for all the losses in her life. One of the twin girls also joins the family. However, towards the end of the serial, Kanchi is finally reunited with her family of two girls and husband. She also realizes her mother's plotting against her husband which made them foes all these years. The family soon rejoins under the father and she hands over her responsibilities to her children and starts a new journey with her husband Rajarathnam.

== Cast ==
=== Main ===
- Sadhika Venugopal / Surya Mohan as Thamara
- Meena Kumari as Kanchi Amma
- Richard N. J. as Abhijith Chettiyar a.k.a. Abhikuttan
- Akash V H as Ajayan Chettiyar a.k.a. Ajayankuttan
- Amritha Varnan as Mahalakshmi
- Neeraja as Veena

=== Recurring ===
- Sarath Das as Hari Shankar
- Darshana as Varalakshmi Harishankar
- Soniya Baiju Kottarakkara as Prabha
- Amith as Rajarathinam
- Dinesh Panicker as Kochettan
- Azeez as Nellikkadan
- T. P. Madhavan as Madhavan
- Vijay Menon
- Sreelatha Namboothiri as Athai
- Sarath Kumar as Chanku
- Mohan Ayroor
- Darshana Das as Varalakshmi
- Sreekala
- Devi Chandana
- Charutha Baiju
- Gopi as Gopi

== Awards ==
Year	Award	Category	Nominee(s)	Result
2013	Kazhcha Television awards	Best Director	AM Nazeer	Won
2013	Kazhcha Television awards	Special Jury award	Sadhika Venugopal	Won
2014	Kerala State Film Critic TV Awards	Best Actor	Akash V H	Won
2014	K.P Ummer State Award	Best Actor	Akash V H	Won
2014	Adoor Bhasi Television awards	Most Popular Serial	Pattu Saree	Won
2014	Adoor Bhasi Television awards	Most Popular Actress	Sadhika Venugopal	Won
	Filmcity Magazine Award	Performance award	Akash V H	Won
