= Nazarethpettai =

Neighbourhood in Tiruvallur district, Tamil Nadu, India

Coordinates: 12°49′N 79°44′E

Nazarethpettai நசரத்பேட்டை
- Village
- Location in Tamil Nadu, India
- Country: India
- State: Tamil Nadu

Languages
  - Official: Tamil
- Time zone: UTC+5:30 (IST)
- Nearest city: Chennai

Nazarethpettai is a City approximately 10 kilometers north of Chennai. It is the birthplace of the former Chief Minister of Madras Presidency and leader of the Indian National Congress Minjur Bhaktavatsalam.
