= Anbe Vaa (2009 TV series) =

Indian Tamil-language soap opera

- Genre: Romance; Drama
- Directed by: Venkat Ramanan
- Starring: Arjun; Sonu Satheesh Kumar; Abirami; Hemalatha; Arun Prabu Purushothaman; Gowtham; Rajasekhar
- Country of origin: India
- Original language: Tamil
- No. of seasons: 1
- No. of episodes: 122

Production
- Camera setup: Multi-camera
- Running time: approx. 20-22 minutes per episode

Original release
- Network: Star Vijay
- Release: 15 June 2009 – 12 February 2010

Anbe Vaa is a 2009 Indian Tamil-language television series, that aired Monday through Thursday on Star Vijay from 15 June 2009 to 12 February 2010 at 20:00 (IST) for 122 episodes. The show starred Arjun, Sonu Satheesh Kumar, Abirami, Hemalatha, Arun Prabu Purushothaman, Gowtham and among others. It was directed by Venkat Ramanan.

== Plot ==
It is a story about three friends named Jana, Adi and Jeeva. They are ready to plunge into the real world of love and want to experience the same.

== Cast ==
Actor / Actress	Drama character	Characteristics
Arjun	Jeeva	a bank executive and has a childhood friend named Sandhya.
Sonu	Sandhya	a Teacher and Jeeva's childhood friend who loves him dearly, however, Jeeva does not love her as he is in love with Priya.
Abirami	Priya	sandhya's Friend, Jeeva's Lover
Hemalatha	Angel	Adi's lover; a Christian girl
Gautam	Jana	a Kabaddi player and is in love with Devi
Arun Prabu Purushothaman	Adi	is an advocate by profession and is from an orthodox Brahmin family. He is in love with angel
Priya	Devi	Jana's GirlFriend
Rajasekhar		Sandhya's Father
Kuyili		

== Title song ==
Track list
No.	Title	Length
1.	"Oru Parvai Parkkurai (title song)"	2:50
