= Mahalakshmi (TV series) =

Indian television series

- Genre: Supernatural; Crime thriller
- Created by: Shaan Karthick
- Written by: Shaan Karthik; Dialogues; Nandhan; Shridharan; Padmavathy; Jagan
- Screenplay by: Shaan Karthik
- Directed by: Shaan Karthik (1-25); M.K.Arundhavaraja (26-276); Sai Marudhu (276-530); R.Karthikeyan (531-805)
- Creative director: Divya Dinesh
- Starring: Kavya Shastry; Mohan Sharma; Vallab Suri; Hemandh; Sindhu Sadhana; Bushmi; Vicky Roshan; Lakshmi Raj; Sonu Satheesh Kumar; Delhi Kumar; Anuradha Krishnamurthy; Raghavi Sashikumar
- Theme music composer: Hari
- Opening theme: "Anbenum Anbenum Munjanile"
- Country of origin: India
- Original language: Tamil
- No. of seasons: 1
- No. of episodes: 805

Production
- Producer: Vaidehi Ramamurthy
- Cinematography: A.M.John Anand; R.Parthipan P.Ganesh kumar
- Editors: M.S.Thiyagarajan; M.N.Perumal; G.Shakthivel; R.Baskar
- Camera setup: Multi-camera
- Running time: approx. 18-22 minutes per episode
- Production company: Vision Time India Private Limited

Original release
- Network: Sun TV
- Release: 6 March 2017 – 14 December 2019

Mahalakshmi is an Indian Tamil-language soap opera starring Kavya Shastry, Hemanth Kumar and Sonu Satheesh Kumar. This serial was premiered on Sun TV on 6 March 2017 and ended on 14 December 2019 with 805 episodes. This serial was produced by Vision Time India Private Limited, and directed by R.Karthikeyan This serial was the replacement of previous reality-justice show Nijangal which was produced by Vision Time India Private Limited and Plan V Productions, It was aired from 22 October 2016 to 4 March 2017 with 218 episodes, and this serial was replaced by the next serial Chocolate which was produced by Sun Entertainment, and Vision Time India Private Limited, It started airing on 16 December 2019 and suddenly ended on 31 March 2020 with 84 episodes due to the COVID-19 pandemic.

== Synopsis ==
It is the story of Mahalakshmi, who follows non-violence and discipline. She takes a crucial step just before her engagement with her uncle's son. She files a sexual harassment case against Aravind, a widower with a baby daughter, which creates havoc in her life while Subramani and Meenakshi support her. Vishalam and Ramya create more problems between Aravind and Mahalakshmi. But Mahalakshmi overcomes them and also helps others in overcoming their problems.

== Cast ==
=== Main cast ===
- Kavya Shastry as Mahalakshmi Aravind: Aravind's Second Wife (She is the adoptive mother of Samyukutha and She is Vishwanthan's daughter).
- Hemanth as Aravind: Anjali and Mahalakshmi's husband. He is Subramani's and Meenakshi's second son.
- Sindhu Sadhana as Nithya Manjari & Roopa Manjari (twin sisters) dual roles. (Mahalakshmi dual best friends)
- Sonu Satheesh Kumar as Ramya: Vishalam's daughter and Aravind's ex fiancée (Main Antagonist)
- Lakshmi Raj as Mari Muthu a.k.a. Mark Mari (Episodes:721-805)(Antagonist)
- Baby Varshitha as Samyukutha (Mahalakshmi adoptive daughter; Anjali's and Aravind's biological daughter)

=== Recurring cast ===
- Delhi Kumar as Subramani; Raju, Aravind, Karthik and Aarthi's father
- Anuradha Krishnamoorthy as Meenakshi Subramani: Raju, Aravind, Karthik and Aarthi's mother
- Gemini as Velu (Velu Vaathiyar) (Mahalakshmi's Old teacher)
- Narmadha as Kokila (Velu's first daughter).
- Ramya as Chitra (Velu's second daughter).
- Raagavi as Vishalam (Ramya's mother)(Main Antagonist)
- Bushmi as Aarthi; Aravind, Raju, Karthick's sister.
- Yuvanraj Nethrun as Raju: Aravind, Karthik and Aarthi's elder brother
- Sudha Sandheep as Kavitha Raju: Raju's wife
- Baby Sana as Kaviya (Raju and Kavitha's daughter)
- Master Sharvan as Shree Hari (Raju and Kavitha's son)
- Aravish Kumar as Karthik: Aravind and Raju's younger brother
- Aishwarya Sesadhari as Eshwari Karthik: Airavathy's daughter and Karthik's wife(Antagonist)
- Gokul as Manikanda
- Mangaleshwari as Shardha (Mari's mother)
- Comedy Krishnamoorthy as Gangadharan (Mari's father)
- Kiruba as Airavathy Krishnamoorthy: Madhankumar and Eshwari's mother(Antagonist)
- Madhuraa as Parvathi Madhan: Mahalakshmi's adoptive sister
- Shiva as Krishnamoorthy: Madhankumar and Eshwari's father
- Rajesh kumar as Rajesh (Velu Vaathiyar old Student)
- Sathyapriya as Vijayalakshmi (Anjali's grandmother)
- Murghanandham as Arumuga (Mukka)

=== Past cast ===
- Anjali Rao as Anjali (Died in serial)
- Lokesh Bhaskaran as Gowtham (Lead Role)
- Priya as Janaki Vishwanathan (Died in serial)
- Sujatha Panju as Advocate Sree Devi
- Pasi Sathya as Ponnamma
- Rajasekhar as Ehswaramoorthy
- Rajalakshmi as Eshwar's mother
- Pramodini Pammi as Ambigai (Anjali's mother)
- Vizhuthugal Santhanam as Ramachandran (Gowtham's father)
- Nathan Shyam as Vignesh
- Shyam as Inspector Paandi
- Veena Venkatesh as Susheela Ramachandran (Gowtham's mother)
- Mohan Sharma as Vishwanathan (Mahalakshmi's father)
- Kamal as Arun Kumar (Mahalakshmi's old classmate)
- Bobby Bilani as Anand
- Vallab as Aravind (Replaced by Hemanth)
- Baby Shamilly as Young Samyuktha (Aravind and Anjali's daughter)
- Sharath Raj as Sampath(Antagonist)
- Mithun as Bramma (Antagonist)
- Vicky Roshan as Madhankumar (Parvathi's husband, Died in serial)(Antagonist)

== Casting ==
This is the first serial of actress Kavya Shastry in Tamil-language who is known for her first Serial in Kannada Language like Shubhavivaha. Anjali Rao appeared in flash back sequences. Lokesh and Hemanth portray the male lead role.

Other supporting cast include Delhi Kumar, Mohan Sharma, Rajasekhar, Priya, Santhanam. Sonu Satheesh Kumar well known for Sthreedhanam serial portrayed the main antagonist role.
