= Velunachi =

- Genre: Drama
- Written by: Pugazhendhi Singaravelan; V. Arun Prakash, Balakumaran
- Directed by: AL Abaninthiran S.prabhu shankar
- Starring: V. J. Chitra; Manikandan
- Theme music composer: Visuva
- Country of origin: India
- Original language: Tamil
- No. of seasons: 1
- No. of episodes: 120

Production
- Producer: S Kushmavathi
- Editors: A.Ezakiraj; S.Murugan Neminaathan
- Camera setup: Multi-camera
- Running time: approx. 22–24 minutes per episode

Original release
- Network: Colors Tamil
- Release: 20 February – 26 July 2018

Velunatchi is a 2018 Tamil Language soap opera starring V. J. Chitra, Manikandan. It aired on Colors Tamil from 20 February 2018 to 26 July 2018.

The series marks Manikandan's first small screen role since 2014. It is a story of a young girl Velunatchi (V. J. Chitra) who transforms herself into a strong woman carrying her father's lineage. It is a first soap opera about Silambam.

== Overview ==
Velunaachi's father was a silambam artist. He was everything to her. When he became physically challenged after an incident she takes care of him.

== Cast ==
- V. J. Chitra as Velunachi
- Manikandan Rajesh as Arul
- S.Kavitha
