= Vendhar TV =

Tamil television channel

- Country: India
- Broadcast area: India
- Headquarters: Chennai, Tamil Nadu, India

Programming
- Language(s): Tamil
- Picture format: 576i SD

Ownership
- Owner: SRM Group

History
- Launched: 24 August 2014

Links
- Website: vendharmedia.in

Vendhar TV is an Indian general entertainment television channel broadcasting in the Tamil-language. It was launched on 24 August 2014 by SRM group.

The channel features a number of shows, such as Oru Sol Khealir, Vendhar Veetu Kalyanam, Sundharakandam, Bharathi Kannamma, Mudivalla Arambam, Suryavamsam, Iruvar, Ninaithale Innikum, Kollywood Roundup, Puthumputhu Kaalai, Ring O Ring, and Thinnai.

== Programming ==
- Thai Veedu

=== Dubbed soap operas ===
- Kannae En Kannmaniey
- Suryavamsam
