= Syed Anwar Ahmed =

Public Figure

Syedd annwar
- Born: 19 March 1989 (age 37); Hyderabad, Andhra Pradesh, (now Telangana), India
- Education: Sri Chaitanya College; St. Mary's High School
- Occupations: Actor and television producer
- Years active: 2008–present
- Spouse: Sameera Sherief (m. 2019)
- Parent: Shanoor Sana (Mother)

Syedd Annwar is an Indian actor and television producer. In 2011, he made acting and production debut in Tamil television with Pirivom Santhippom under his banner Evergreen Productions along with him introducing Kalyani, Rachitha Mahalakshmi and Dinesh Goplalsamy. The same year he produced Saravanan Meenatchi which was a popular serial featuring the hit pair of 2007 serial Madurai Mirchi Senthil, Sreeja Chandran in the lead titular roles and along with them he also appeared in a brief supporting role. In 2013, he acted in the serial Thayumanavan. In 2016, he started to act in the serial Pagal Nilavu along with his fiancé Sameera Sherief, Vignesh Karthick and Soundarya Bala Nandakumar.

In 2017, he started acting in a supporting role in “Rekka Katti Parakuthu Manasu” telecasted in Zee Tamil produced by M/s Orange Media Production.

In 2018, he produced the serial ‘Ponmagal Vanthal” telecasted in Star Vijay produced under the banner M/s Syed Studios, which is off-air now. On the personal front he married his Pagal Nilavu co-star Sameer Sherief in 2019. The couple have a son born on 4 September 2021.

== Filmography ==
=== Actor ===
Year	Serial	Role	Language	Channel	Notes
2011-2013	Pirivom Santhippom	Prabhu	Tamil	STAR Vijay	lead role
2011	Saravanan Meenatchi	Jeeva	Tamil	STAR Vijay	Supporting role
2013	Thayumanavan	Ashok	Tamil	STAR Vijay	Supporting role
2016-2018	Pagal Nilavu	Prabhakaran	Tamil	STAR Vijay	lead role
2017–2019	Rekka Katti Parakkudhu Manasu	Arunachalam	Tamil	Zee Thamizh	Supporting role
2021	Aravinda Sametha	Adithya	Telugu	Gemini TV	Lead role

=== Producer ===
Year	Serial	Language	Channel	Notes
2011	Pirivom Santhippom	Tamil	STAR Vijay	Under Evergreen Productions
2011	Saravanan Meenatchi	Tamil	STAR Vijay	Under Evergreen Productions
2016	Dance Jodi Dance (Grand Finale)	Tamil	Zee Thamizh	Under Orange Media Production along with Sameera Shrief
2017	Rekka Katti Parakkudhu Manasu	Tamil	Zee Thamizh	Under Orange Media Production along with Sameera Shrief
2018	Ponmagal Vanthal	Tamil	STAR Vijay	Under Syed Studios

== Awards and honours ==
Year	Award	Category	Work	Result
2014	Vijay Television Awards	Vijay Television Awards for Favourite Actor	Pirivom Santhippom (TV series)	Won
2014	Vijay Television Awards	Vijay Television Awards for Favourite Screen Pair	Pagal Nilavu (TV series)	Won
