= Ganga (TV series) =

Indian television series

- Genre: Soap opera Supernatural
- Written by: C. U. Muthuselvan; Ashokan (Dialogues)
- Screenplay by: sarath
- Story by: Indhra Soundharajan
- Directed by: Sadhasivam Perumaal (1–176); R. Ilavarasan (177–287); N.Sundhareshwaran (287–464)
- Creative director: Sujatha Vijaykumar
- Starring: Pradeep Bennetto Ryan; Mounica; Vimal Venkatesan
- Theme music composer: Srikanth Deva
- Opening theme: "Ganga Maa"; Ananthu (Vocals); Kiruthiya (Lyrics)
- Country of origin: India
- Original language: Tamil
- No. of seasons: 2
- No. of episodes: 464

Production
- Cinematography: Vaseegaran; P.Chithiraiselvan
- Editors: Manikandan Ravi; Akbar Baasha; N.Vishwa
- Camera setup: Multi-camera
- Running time: approx. 20–22 minutes per episode
- Production company: Home Movie Makers Pvt. Ltd

Original release
- Network: Sun TV
- Release: 2 January 2017 – 7 July 2018

Ganga is a 2017 Indian Tamil-language supernatural soap opera, starring Mounica, Pradeep, Piyali, Anuradha and Yuvarani in the first season. The story is partially based on Indra Soundar Rajan's novel and remake of the Telugu language television series Saptha Mathrika which aired on Gemini TV from 2016–2017. It replaced Pasamalar and aired on Sun TV from Monday to Saturday from 2 January 2017 to 7 July 2018 for 464 episodes which was then replaced by Kanmani serial .

The second season of this serial starred Pradeep Bennetto Ryan, Mounica, Jayashri Chaki, Kalyani, Vimal Venkatesan, Geerthana, Aravind, GK, Premi Venkat, Ajay Kapoor and Vincent Roy. The show completed its 400th episode on 24 April 2018.

== Synopsis ==
Season 01

The story takes place in the small village of Kannikapuram where a curse has been cast upon the unwed maidens of the village by Ganga, a powerful deity. Abhirami, the lead protagonist, falls in love with a man from the same village but is unable to confess her love to him due to the fear of the curse. As a result, she decides to find a way to break the curse and save the unwed maidens from the wrath of Ganga.

Abhirami's journey takes her through various challenges as she tries to uncover the reason behind the curse and find a way to lift it. She faces opposition from the village elders who are wary of challenging the power of the deity, but she persists in her efforts, determined to find a solution. Along the way, Abhirami discovers the truth about her own family and her connection to the curse. Will she be able to save the village from the curse and marry the man she loves?

Season 02

After the events of Season 01, the story continues with the marriage of Shiva and Gowri. However, Gowri soon realizes that Shiva still harbors feelings for Abhirami and not her. Faced with this reality, she decides to help Shiva marry Abhirami instead.

As the wedding preparations are underway, a tragic accident occurs which results in Shiva losing his memory. He has no recollection of his past, including his marriage to Abhirami. Gowri and Abhirami are left to pick up the pieces and help Shiva regain his memories.

This journey is not without its challenges, as Gowri struggles to come to terms with her own feelings for Shiva and Abhirami grapples with the possibility that Shiva may never remember their love. The story follows the trio as they navigate the complexities of their relationships and ultimately find a way to move forward together.

Will Shiva regain his memories and accept Abhirami as his wife? How will Gowri come to terms with her feelings for Shiva? The answers to these questions form the crux of Season 02.

== Cast ==
Main cast

- Pradeep Benetto Ryan as Shiva (Gowri and Abirami's husband) (Episode: 1 – 464)
- Mounica as Gangamma (Episode: 1–186) / Gowri Shiva (Shiva's First Wife) (double role from Episode: 131 – 464)
- Kalyani as Abirami (Shiva's Second wife) (Episode: 220–464)
- Vimal Venkatesan as Jeyasimma (Krishna's brother and Malar's husband) (Episode: 131 – 464)
- Suju Vasan as Malar (Jeyasimma's wife) (Episode: 250 – 464)
- Ajay Kapoor as Ajay Jayaraman (AJ; Antagonist, Episode: 220–464)

Additional cast

- Keerthana Podhuval as Sowmya (Abirami's sister & Krishna's wife)
- Fawaz Zayani as Krishna (Sowmya's husband)
- Premi Venkat as Dhamayandhi (Jeyasimma's mother)
- Iraa Agarwal as Mahima
- Prabhavathi
- Ravi Raj
- Vincent Roy as Ramanathan (Episode: 220–464)
- Murali Kumar as Narasimha, Bhupathi's son
- Jeevitha as ACP Swarna
- Sujatha

Former Cast

- Piyali Munshi as Abirami (Episode: 1–186), a Goddess power and tale of Ganga, she loves Shiva, but some reason Shiva gets to married Gowri.
- L.Raja as Abirami & Sowmya's father (Episode: 1–186)
- Yuvarani as Kanaka, Shiva's mother (died in the serial) (Episode: 8-186), Shiva Mother and Gowri Aunt
- Kavitha as Rudhramma (Episode: 123–151)
- Manju Bhargavi as Alangaara Naachiyaar (Episode 1 to 43) and Anuradha as Alangaara Naachiyaar
- Navin Victor as Prabha (died in the serial, killed by) (Episode: 1–95), Shiva and Abirami colleague
- --- (Episode: 189 – 199) and Kalyani as Malar (Episode: 200 – 249)
- Aravind as Krishna (Sowmya's husband)
- Vijakrushna Raj as Zamindar Bhupathi
- Naveen Arakkal
- GK as Narasimha, Bhupathi's son
- Ashok Kannan
- Subalakshmi Rangan as Karthika
- Nivisha

== Casting ==
Season 1

Season 1 Series is a Supernatural Fantasy Thriller story produced by Home Movie Makers under the banner Home Movie Makers Pvt.Ltd that airs on Sun TV. Actress Piyali Munshi was selected to portray the lead role of Abirami, This is First serial in Tamil-language. Who is known for her Serial in Hindi Language likes Siya Ke Ram, Sasural Simar Ka, Santoshi Maa and Savdhaan India. Telugu Actress Mounica Makes her debut in Tamil Serial in and as Ganga. Pradeep was selected to portray the lead role of Shiva. Yuvarani who was also cast in Home Movie Makers TV Series Pasamalar was selected to portray the Main role of Shiva's mother. Manju Bhargavi was cast to portray the negative role of Alangaara Naachiyaar. Later Anuradha was replaced role of Alangaara Naachiyaar in Episode: 44. Other supporting cast include GK, Premi Venkat, Aravind, Prabhavathi, Vijakrushna Raj.

Season 2

Season 2 Series is a Family story, in this Season old actors are working with new actors. Actress Poornitha was selected to portray the new lead role of Malar. Who is known for her Serial like Annamalai, Pirivom Santhippom: Season 1, Thayumanavan and Andal Azhagar. Later Sri Padma was replaced role of Malar in Episode: 250. Other first-season cast include Pradeep Benetto Ryan, Mounica, Vimal Venkatesan, Geerthana, Aravind and Premi Venkat.

== Seasons overview ==
Season	Episodes	Originally aired		Time	Genre
Season	Episodes	First aired	Last aired	Time	Genre
1	1–186	2 January 2017	8 August 2017	Monday – Saturday; 6:30PM (IST)	Supernatural; Fantasy; Thriller; Romance; Family
2	187–464	9 August 2017	7 July 2018	Monday – Saturday; 6:30PM (IST)	Romance; Family

== Original soundtrack ==
=== Title song ===
It was written by lyricist Kiruthiya, composed by the music director Srikanth Deva. It was sung by Ananthu.

=== Soundtrack ===
Track list
No.	Title	Lyrics	Singer(s)	Length
1.	"Ganga Maa (கங்கம்மா)"	Kiruthiya	Ananthu	4:00
2.	"Chellatha Gangaiyamma (செல்லதா கங்கையம்மா)"	Kiruthiya	Chinnaponnu	2:00
