= Azhagi (TV series) =

Indian Tamil-language soap opera

- Logo
- Also known as: Beautiful Woman
- அழகி
- Genre: Soap opera
- Directed by: V.C Ravi (1-502); A. Jawahar (503-595); E.Vikramadhithan (596-747); M.Iniyan Dinesh (748-1101)
- Starring: Viji Chandrasekhar; Kamal Deep; Soniya; Ilavarasan; Madhumitha
- Theme music composer: Kiran
- Opening theme: "Poovum Azhage"; Haricharan (Vocal); Yugabharathi (Lyrics)
- Country of origin: India
- Original language: Tamil
- No. of seasons: 1
- No. of episodes: 1,101

Production
- Camera setup: Multi-camera
- Running time: approx. 20-22 minutes per episode
- Production company: Vikatan Televistas Pvt Ltd

Original release
- Network: Sun TV
- Release: 10 October 2011 – 4 March 2016

Related
- Amma

Azhagi is an Indian Tamil-language television soap opera that aired on Sun TV from 10 October 2011 to 4 March 2016 for 1101 episodes.

The show starred Viji Chandrasekhar, Kamal Deep, Soniya and Ilavarasan. It was produced by Vikatan Televistas Pvt Ltd and director by V.C Ravi, A. Jawahar, E. Vikramadhithan and M.Iniyan Dinesh.

The series has been remade into Telugu language as Amma aired on Gemini TV, and in Malayalam language as Amma Manasam broadcast on Surya TV.

== Plot synopsis ==
Azhagi is the story of Sundari (Viji Chandrasekhar), 40-year-old widow, who has struggled for the last 20 years with the sole aim of bringing up her children all by herself. The story underscores how this vulnerable yet resilient widow battles the hardships life throws at her.

Sundari is a hardworking single parent raising her three children by working as domestic help. Her brother in law 'Dhorai' provides lots of hindrance in her life. He is instigated by his wife vasantha.

The story depicts how sundari is cheated over properties by her brother in law and her Co sister after her husbands demise. Sundari along with her children were thrown out of their house by dhorai and vasantha.

== Cast ==
- Viji Chandrasekhar as Sundari Kathirvelan
- Kamal Deep as Natraj Kathirvelan (Kathirvelan and Sundari's son)
- Soniya as Divya Natraj (Natraj's wife and Sundari's daughter-in-law and Chandra's daughter)
- Nithya Ravindran as Major Amma
- Sulakshana / Surekha as Chandra (Divya and Nimmi's mother)
- Shalu Kurian / Kutty Pooja / Dhesikha as Niraimathi (Mathi) (Sundari and Kathiravan's oldest daughter and Somu's ex-wife and Babu's wife)
- Arun Kumar Rajan / J.Durai Raj as Somusundaram (Somu) (Sundari's ex-son-in-law, Panchali's son and Mathi's ex-husband)
- Sujatha Selvaraj as Panchali (Somu's mother)
- Radha as Surya Marisamy (Sundari and Kathirvelan's younger daughter and Marisamy's wife)
- Satish Kumar as Marisamy (Sundari's son-in-law/ Surya Kathirvelan's husband)
- Nanjil Nalini as Jegathambal (Sundari's mother-in-law and Kathirvelan and Durai's mother)
- Ilavarasu / Sridhar as Durai (Kathirvelan's brother and Sundari's brother-in-law and Vasantha's husband)
- Nagalakshmi as Vasantha Durai (Durai's wife)
- Ashwin as Sanjay Durai (Durai and Vasantha's son)
- Niranjini Ashok / Vineetha as Nithya Durai / Nithya Babu (Durai's daughter and Babu's ex-wife)
- Vincent Roy as Kalithirthan
- Ganesh Gopinath / Iyyappan Unni as Babu Kalithirthan (Kalitheerthan's son and Nithya's ex-husband and Mathi's husband)
- Harikrishnan as Shyam (Natraj Kathiravan's best friend and Kalithirthan's son in-law)
- Srividya as Nirmala "Nimmi" Prabhu (Divya's sister and Chandra's daughter)
- Jaheer Hassain as Prabhu (Divya's brother-in-law, Chandra's son in-law and Nimmi's husband)
- Madhumitha as Chitra
- Deepa Shankar as Sridevi
- Gayathri Yuvraaj as Nila
- Andrew Jesudoss as police inspector

== Original soundtrack ==
=== Title song ===
It was written by Yugabharathi, composed by the Kiran. It was sung by Haricharan.

=== Soundtrack ===
Tracklist
No.	Title	Lyrics	Singer(s)	Length
1.	"Poovum Azhage"	Yugabharathi	Haricharan	4:22

== Production ==
The series was directed by V.C Ravi (1-502), A. Jawahar (503-595) E.Vikramadhithan and M.Iniyan Dinesh. It was produced by Vikatan Televistas Pvt Ltd.

== Remake ==
The series has been remade into Telugu language as Amma broadcast on Gemini TV and Malayalam language as Amma Manasam broadcast on Surya TV.

Country	Language	Channel	Show Name	Aired (Date)
India	Telugu language	Gemini TV	Amma	17 March 2014 – 14 August 2014
India	Malayalam language	Surya TV	Amma Manasam	16 June 2014 – 26 December 2014

== Awards and nominations ==
Year	Award	Category	Recipient	Role	Result
2012	Sun Kudumbam Awards	Best Mother Awards	Viji Chandrasekhar	Sundari	Won
2014	Sun Kudumbam Awards	Best Mother Awards	Viji Chandrasekhar	Sundari	Won
2014	Sun Kudumbam Awards	Best Father	Vincent Raj	Kalithirthan	Nominated
2014	Sun Kudumbam Awards	Best Comedian-Female	Sujatha	Panjali	Nominated

== See also ==
- List of programs broadcast by Sun TV
