= Monisha Shaji =

Indian television actress

- Born: 11 March; Sultan Bathery, Wayanad, Kerala
- Other name: Monisha Arshak
- Education: Malabar Christian College, Calicut; St. Teresa's College, Ernakulam
- Occupations: Television Actress; Classical dancer
- Years active: 2016–present
- Spouse: Arshak Nath (m. 2018; div. 2022)

Monisha Shaji (formerly Monisha Arshak) is an Indian television actress known for her works in Malayalam and Tamil television industry. She made her television debut through Manjurukum Kaalam.

== Early life ==
Monisha was born at Sultan Bathery, Wayanad to P.K Shaji and Indira. She did her schooling in Thripunithura Sanskrit higher secondary school, Ernakulam and acquired her degree in BEd from Malabar Christian College, Calicut and St. Teresa's College, Ernakulam. She has two brothers Midhun Shah and Manek Shah. In 2018, she married Arshak Nath and later divorced in 2022.

== Filmography ==
=== Films ===
Year	Title	Role	Language	Notes	Ref.
2021	Ellam Sheriyakum	Party office staff member	Malayalam		
2022	Salute	Jhansi	Malayalam		
2022	Ini Utharam	News Reporter	Malayalam		

=== Television ===
TV serials

Year	Title	Role	Channel	Language	Notes	Ref.
2016-2017	Manjurukum Kalam	V.R. Janaki/ Jani	Mazhavil Manorama	Malayalam	Debut/ Replaced Nikitha Rajesh	
2017	Jagratha	Deepthi	Amrita TV	Malayalam		
2017-2018	Malarvadi	Thenmozhi (Mozhi)	Flowers TV	Malayalam		
2018-2020	Aranmanai Kili	Janaki Arjun Sundareshwar (Jaanu)	Vijay TV	Tamil		
2018	Pandian Stores	Janu	Vijay TV	Tamil	Guest appearance	
2019-2020	Chackoyum Maryyum	Neelambari	Mazhavil Manorama	Malayalam		
2019	Chinna Thambi	Janaki Arjun Sundareshwar	Star Vijay	Tamil	Cross-Over Episodes with Aranmanai Kili	
2021	Poove Poochudava	Janaki Mahendra Singh	Zee Tamil	Tamil		
2021–2022	Naam Iruvar Namakku Iruvar Season 2	Maha Lakshmi Mayan (Mayan)	Star Vijay	Tamil	Replaced Rachitha Mahalakshmi	
2022	Pachakili	Pachakili	Colors Tamil	Tamil		
2023–2024	Anu Ane Nenu	Anu	Gemini TV	Telugu		
2024–2026	Manathe Kottaram	Vandana	Zee Keralam	Malayalam		
2024	Mangalyam	Vandana	Zee Keralam	Malayalam	Guest Appearance	
2025	Madhura Nombara Kattu	Vandana	Zee Keralam	Malayalam	Mahasangamam episodes	
2026	Pavam pavam kodeeshwaran	Aleena	Kuku TV	Malayalam	Web serial	

==== TV shows ====
Year	Title	Role	Channel	Language	Notes	Ref.
2016	Onnum Onnum Moonu Season 2	Guest	Mazhavil Manorama	Malayalam		
2017	Komady Circus	Guest	Mazhavil Manorama	Malayalam		
2017	Kalladuppum Karichattiyum	Presenter	Amrita TV	Malayalam	Cookery show	
2018	Enkita Modhadhae (Season 1)	Participant	Vijay TV	Tamil	Reality Game Show	
2019	Enkita Modhadhae (Season 2)	Participant	Vijay TV	Tamil	Reality Game Show	
2019	Lets Rock & Roll	Participant	Zee Keralam	Malayalam	Reality Game Show	
2020	Atham Pathu Ruchi	Celebrity Presenter	Mazhavil Manorama	Malayalam		
2024–present	Star Magic	Contestant	Flowers TV	Malayalam		
2026	Second Love	Contestant	Star Vijay	Tamil	Dating Show	
