= Nachiyarpuram =

Indian television series

- Genre: Soap opera
- Created by: Dinesh Gopalsamy
- Written by: Vasagar Kaliyappan
- Directed by: Rajsekar; G. Manikanda Kumar
- Starring: Dinesh Gopalsamy; Rachitha Mahalakshmi; Vadivukkarasi; Bharathi Mohan
- Country of origin: India
- Original language: Tamil
- No. of seasons: 1
- No. of episodes: 218

Production
- Executive producer: K.M. Saravanan (Zee Tamil)
- Producer: Hemachandran
- Camera setup: Multi-camera
- Running time: 25-27 minutes
- Production company: Golden Moon Production

Original release
- Network: Zee Tamil
- Release: 8 July 2019 – 14 August 2020

Nachiyarpuram is an Indian Tamil language drama aired on Zee Tamil network and on their official ZEE5 platform. It premiered on 8 July 2019 from Monday to Saturday. Then It was rescheduled from Monday to Friday. The series stars the real-life couple Rachitha Mahalakshmi and Dinesh Gopalsamy. Due COVID-19 pandemic, this series was ended with final Episode-218 on Zee Tamil.

== Synopsis ==
Jyothi and Karthi, fall in love with each other. But their family were separated in past as Jyothi's aunt Jayalakshmi marries a man Natarajan against her family, she is none other than Karthi's mother. How Jyothi and Karthi marries against their families forms crux of the story.

== Cast ==
=== Main ===
- Dinesh Gopalsamy as Karthi
- Rachitha Mahalakshmi as Jyothi

=== Recurring ===
- Vadivukkarasi as Nagaratnam
- Girish as Natarajan
- Premi Venkat as Jayalakshmi
- Deepa Nethran as Seethalakshmi
- Deepa Shankar as Saraswathi "Sarasu"
- Reshma Reshu as Chitra
- Bharathi Mohan as Poiyamuzhi, Main antagonist
- Azhagappan as Pounraj
- Venkat Subha as Jayaraman
- Ashwin Karthik as Dharma
- Balasubramani as Natarajan's younger brother
- Usha Sai as Marikozhundhu
- Pavithra Rajasekaran as Aandal
- Kaavya as Janavi (Jaanu Pappa)
- Rhema Ashok as Aishwarya
- Madhu Mohan as Advocate Santhakumar
- Sudha as Advocate Santhakumari
- Revathy Shankar as Jagadambal
- Tharsika as Divya
- Sasindhar Pushpalingam as Ashok
- Nimesh Sagar as Santhakumar's son

== Casting ==
Saravanan Meenatchi fame Rachitha Mahalakshmi and Poove Poochudava fame Dinesh Gopalsamy, the real life couple plays the lead roles. They both joins second time in television fiction after Pirivom Santhippom TV series. Actress Vadivukkarasi plays a negative role, where Girish, Deepa Nethran, Premi Venkat, Bharathi Mohan, Deepa Shankar, Venkat Subha, Farina and Rhema plays supporting roles.
