= Anu Ane Nenu =

Indian Telugu language soap opera

- Genre: Drama; family
- Written by: Dialogues; Malathi Netaji
- Screenplay by: I Ashokan
- Directed by: Srinivas Charan
- Starring: Monisha Arshak; Pranay; Chaya Singh
- Opening theme: "Andala Brundavanam"; Sagar Narayana M (lyrics) vocals Sai Vignesh; Manasi G kannan Aparna
- Composer: Raghunandan N R
- Country of origin: India
- Original language: Telugu
- No. of seasons: 1
- No. of episodes: 381

Production
- Executive producer: Sathisha M poojary
- Producer: V Tamiladasan
- Cinematography: Rudramani
- Editors: Rajkumar Alagan Tamilmani; Aravind Raju
- Camera setup: Multi-camera
- Running time: 20-22 minutes
- Production company: Eastern Story Productions

Original release
- Network: Gemini TV
- Release: 6 March 2023 – 25 May 2024

Anu Ane Nenu (transl. I, Anu) is an Indian Telugu language soap opera premiered on 6 March 2023 airing on GeminiTV and it is available for worldwide streaming on Sun NXT. The show stars Monisha Arshak in titular role and Pranay, Chaya Singh in lead roles.

== Cast ==
- Monisha Arshak as Anu
- Jai Akash / Pranay as Dr Venkatesh
- Chaya Singh as Akshara: Venkatesh's wife
- Prasad Babu as Gurumoorthy: Akshara's father
- Archana Ananth as Archana
- Yamuna Srinidhi as Bhagyalakshmi: Vanitha and Kavitha's mother
- Srinivas as Vanitha and Kavitha's father
- Sneha Eswar as Renuka: Akshara's Aunt
- Padmini Narasimhan as Parvathamma: Venkatesh's mother
- Navyanarayan Gowda as Kavitha
- Bhavya Poojary as Vanitha
- Ankitha Gowda as Pooja
- Draksharamam Saroja as Mahalakshmi: Vanitha's grand mother
- Anusha as Neela: Akshara's assistant
- Baby Aaradhya as Shruthi: Venkatesh and Akshara's daughter
- Jabardast Sunny as Madhav: Venkatesh's assistant
- Haritha Erla as Dr Varsha

== Adaptations ==
Language	Title	Original release	Network(s)	Last aired	Notes
Telugu	Anu Ane Nenu అను అనే నేను	6 March 2023	Gemini TV	25 May 2024	Original
Malayalam	Hridayam ഹൃദയം	20 November 2023	Surya TV		
Kannada	Savijani ಸಾವಿಜನಿ	22 December 2025	Udaya TV	Ongoing	Remake
