= Raksha Holla =

Indian actress

- Born: 26 January 1991 (age 35); Kundapur, Karnataka, India
- Occupation: Actress
- Years active: 1998–present

Raksha Holla (born 26 January 1991) is an Indian television actress who predominantly works in Tamil and Kannada television. She started her career as a child actor. She is best known for her role as Devi Mayan in the Tamil soap opera Naam Iruvar Namakku Iruvar.

== Early life ==
Holla was born on 26 January 1991 in Kundapur, Karnataka. She did her Schooling in Nalanda International Public School, Hosur and completed her college Degree in Bangalore.

In 2018, she married her long time boyfriend Rakesh.

She currently resides in Chennai, Tamil Nadu with her spouse Rakesh whom she married in 2018.

== Career ==
Holla started as a child actor with the 1998 Kannada-language film, Hendithghelthini. She was credited as Baby Raksha. By the age of nine, she had appeared in around 25 films. In Kavitha Lankesh's Bimba (2002), she was cast as a child star who is pampered and exploited by the film industry. She had also appeared in television series namely Bhageerathi, Ambika and Beladingalagi Baa.

Holla started her modelling career at the age of 22. She returned to television with Puttinti Pattu Cheera, directed by Rasidh Pedha. She subsequently appeared in well known Kannada television series such as Pallavi Anupallavi, Milana, Kogile, and Maya.

She returned to films with Ricky in 2016. She then appeared in Tarak (2017) and Aa Eradu Varshagalu (2017).

She also made her Tamil television debut with the mythology show Tamil Kadavul Murugan in Star Vijay. She also was doing the leading role in Naam Iruvar Namakku Iruvar serial which also aired on Star Vijay. She late went on to act in the Kannada serial Bayasade Balli Bande which aired on Star Suvarna.

== Filmography ==
=== Television ===
Year	Title	Role	Channel	Language	Notes
2013–2017	Vamsam	Priya Kavitha	Sun TV	Tamil	
2016–2017	Puttinti Pattu Cheera	Sumathi	Star Suvarna	Kannada	
2016–2017	Pallavi Anupallavi	Lakshmi	Star Suvarna	Kannada	
2016–2017	Milana	Anupama	Star Suvarna	Kannada	
2016–2017	Kogile	Samyuktha	Star Suvarna	Kannada	
2016–2017	Maya	Archana	Star Suvarna	Kannada	
2017–2018	Tamil Kadavul Murugan	Ajamukhi	Star Vijay	Tamil	
2017	Raja Rani	Devi Mayan	Star Vijay	Tamil	Cameo appearance
2018	Sagala vs Ragala	Contestant	Star Vijay	Tamil	Reality show
2018–2020	Naam Iruvar Namakku Iruvar	Devi Mayan	Star Vijay	Tamil	
2020–2022	Idhayathai Thirudathe	Shankari	Colors Tamil	Tamil	
2021–2022	Anbe Sivam	Anbu Selvi	Zee Tamil	Tamil	Replaced by Kavitha Gowda
2019–2022	Bayasade Balli Bande	Preethi	Star Suvarna	Kannada	
2023	Priyamana thozhi	Pavitra	Sun TV	Tamil	

=== Films ===
- Hendithghelthini (1998)
- Amma Ninna Tholinalli (2001)
- Prema (2002)
- Bimba (2004)
- Ricky as Kaavya (2016)
- Tarak as Gauri (2017)
- Aa Eradu Varshagalu as Padmavathy (2017)
