= Dinesh Gopalsamy =

Indian Tamil actor

- Other name: Dinesh
- Occupation: Actor
- Years active: 2010–present
- Spouse: Rachitha Mahalakshmi (m. 2013; Separation 2021)
- Relatives: Gopalsamy (Father); Amsaveni (Mother)

Dinesh Gopalsamy is an Indian Tamil actor. He made his film debut in Thirumanam Enum Nikkah. Then, he debuted in the TV series Mahan aired on 2010. He became popular by acting in the TV series Poove Poochudava and Nachiyarpuram .

== Personal ==
He made his film debut in 2014 Thirumanam Enum Nikkah. He married actress Rachitha Mahalakshmi, who co-starred in the 2011 TV series Pirivom Sandippom in 2016 and in Mr & Mrs Khiladis. They separated in 2021.

== Filmography ==
=== TV Serials ===
Year	Series/Shows	Character	Channel	Notes
2010	Mahan	Raghavendra Tirtha	Star Vijay	
2011	Pirivom Sandhippom	Karthik	Star Vijay	
2013	Puthu Kavithai	Dhanush	Star Vijay	
2017–2019	Poove Poochudava	Siva	Zee Tamil	Replace by Karthick Vasudevan
2018	Sembaruthi	Siva	Zee Tamil	Special Appearance
2019–2020	Nachiyarpuram	Karthik	Zee Tamil	
2022–2023	Eeramana Rojave 2	JK	Star Vijay	
2022–2023	Karthigai Deepam	Siva	Zee Tamil	
2023	Kizhakku Vaasal	Arjun Dayalan	Star Vijay	Replaced by Sasindhar Pushpalingam
2023–2024	Bigg Boss 7	Contestant	Star Vijay	3rd Runner-up
2024	Anda Ka Kasam	Participant	Star Vijay	

=== Films ===
Year	Movies	Role
2014	Thirumanam Enum Nikkah	Ashraf
