= Aranmanai Kili (TV series) =

Indian Tamil-language soap opera

- Genre: Soap opera Family drama
- Written by: C.U Muthu Selvan
- Directed by: Suresh Shanmugam
- Starring: Monisha Arshak; Surya Darshan; Pragathi; Neelima Rani; Gayathri Yuvraaj; Santhosh; Gayathri Priya
- Country of origin: India
- Original language: Tamil
- No. of seasons: 1
- No. of episodes: 462

Production
- Producer: TR Mathavan
- Cinematography: Sumee Baskaran (2nd unit)
- Editor: S.Mathan kumar
- Camera setup: Multi-camera
- Running time: approx. 20–24 minutes per episode
- Production company: TRM Sri Barati Associate

Original release
- Network: Vijay TV
- Release: 24 September 2018 – 27 March 2020

Aranmanai Kili (transl. Palace's Parrot) is a 2018 Tamil-language drama television series starring Monisha Arshak, Surya Darshan, Pragathi, Neelima Rani, Gayathri Yuvraaj, Santhosh and Gayathri Priya. The show is produced by TRM Sri Barati Associate. It started airing on 24 September 2018 on Vijay TV. The serial was stopped due to the COVID-19 pandemic from 27 March 2020 for 462 episodes. It is dubbed into Telugu as Mahallo Kokila.

== Synopsis ==
Janaki (Monisha Arshak) is a cheerful village girl and her father, Natarajan worked as a servant for Meenakshi's (Pragathi) family, a top business woman from affluent background. Her elder son, Arjun (Surya Darshan) met with an accident during his college time and became physically disabled to walk and this leads him to spend the rest of his life in a wheelchair. Heart broken Meenakshi tries to find a suitable bride for her son. Meanwhile, Durga (Neelima Rani) strongly believes that Meenakshi is the one who betrayed her family. She tries her best to destroy Meenakshi's life by creating havocs in her family. Initially, Meenakshi approaches Shilpa, Arjun's childhood friend for the marriage proposal, however the offer gets rejected as Shilpa opens up to the whole family that she is not meant to marry a disabled man. Next, she approaches Natarajan's elder daughter Renuka, who unwillingly accepts the marriage proposal as her father begged her. On her wedding day, she runs away by leaving a video footage expressing her feelings about the marriage. To save the family's pride, Janaki is forced to marry Arjun. The rest of the story revolves around Janaki and Arjun's marriage life.

== Cast ==
=== Main cast ===
- Monisha Arshak as Janaki Arjun Sundareshwar (Jaanu)
  - a childlike, innocent girl, who is forced to marry the physically challenged man Arjun, she inspires Meenakshi as her idol.
- Surya Darshan as Arjun Sundareshwar
  - a disabled and short tempered but rich man. He hates Jaanu, since when they met each other, later develops feeling for her.
- Pragathi as Meenakshi Sundareshwar (Arjun's mother)
  - a kind-hearted and powerful business woman, she looks happy to the outworld but she is actually sad thinking about Arjun's life.
- Neelima Rani as Durga Raghavan
  - Arjun's cousin, she believes that Meenakshi has caused her misfortunes and seeking for revenge on her.
- Gayathri Yuvraaj as Renuka (Renu)
  - Jaanu's elder sister who runs away when her marriage got fixed with Arjun, later she comes back to get revenge on Meenakshi for humiliating her by marrying Arjun's younger brother, Arun, also to protect Jaanu by standing up to justice.
- Santhosh as Arun Sundareshwar
  - Arjun's younger brother, he has been taking care of Meenakshi's construction business, he falls in love with Renu and eventually married her.
- Gayathri Priya as Devi (Durga's mother)
  - She is an insane woman who was locked in a room and cared by Durga but rescued by Jaanu later, she hates Meenakshi for ruining her life.

=== Supporting cast ===
- Maanas Chavali as Raghavan (Durga's husband)
- Ashwin Karthik as Raghu (Vijaya's husband)
- Myna Nandhini as Vijaya (Yamuna's daughter-in-law)
- Kiruba as Yamuna (Ep: 252–390, Arjun's aunt)
- Shyam as Selvam (Arjun's caretaker)
- Jaffee Pears as Aarthi (Yamuna's daughter)
- R. Aravindraj as Natarajan (Janaki's and Renu's father)
- Rathnaraj as Rathnam (Meenakshi's housekeeper)
- VJ Vishal as Akash (Yamuna's son)
- Sangeetha V

=== Former ===
- Chaitra Rao Sachin (Ep: 1-41) / Nithya Ravindran as Yamuna (Ep: 42-251, replaced by Kiruba)
- "Dubsmash" Vishnu Unnikrishnan as Arun Sundareshwar (replaced by Santhosh)
- Madhumitha Illayaraja as Aarthi (replaced by Jafee Pears)
- Vandana Brundha as Subbulakshmi (Arjun's ex-girlfriend in past)
- Navya Swamy as Shilpa (Arjun's childhood friend)
- Gemini as Shilpa's father
- Mercy Leyal as Shilpa's mother
- Ravichandran as Sivathanam (Meenakshi's rival)
- Unknown as Vaitheeshwari Sivathanam (Sivathanam's wife)
- Sulakshana as Thayyamma
- Shilpa Mary Teresa as Anitha (Arjun's friend)
- Fathima Babu as Judge Kaveri
- Ravikumar as Siddhar
- Suchitra as Lakshmi (Siddhar's assistant)
- Sanju as Professor (Durga's helper)

=== Cameo ===
- Amruth Kalam in a special appearance
- Sridevi Ashok in a special appearance
- Yamuna Chinnadurai as Maaya (Durga's assistant, Cameo)
- Priya as Head of Tribal, special appearance
- Unknown as Selaikkari Amman (Goddess)

== Production ==
=== Casting ===
Malayalam TV actress Monisha series was selected for the female lead role of Janaki. Kannada TV Actor Surya Darshan was selected to portray the male lead role of Arjun. Actress Pragathi will be portraying the mother role. Neelima Rani cast herself as the main antagonist of the series. Official teaser has been released by Star Vijay in YouTube on 3 September 2018.

=== Title ===
This title was taken from a 1993 feature film Aranmanai Kili starring Rajkiran, Ahana, and Gayathri (Baby Santhosh). The English meaning of this title is Parrot of the Palace.
