= 99/66 =

- Theatrical release poster
- Directed by: M. S. Moorthy
- Written by: M. S. Moorthy
- Produced by: M. S. Moorthy
- Starring: Rachitha Mahalakshmi; M. S. Moorthy; Sabari; Rohinth Chellappa; Swetha Dorathy
- Cinematography: Seviloraja
- Edited by: Dv. Meenakshisundar
- Music by: M. S. Moorthy
- Production company: Mitra Pictures
- Release date: 6 March 2026
- Country: India
- Language: Tamil

99/66 is a 2026 Indian Tamil-language horror thriller film written, directed, produced, and scored by M. S. Moorthy. It stars Rachitha Mahalakshmi, M. S. Moorthy, Sabari, Rohinth Chellappa, and Swetha Dorathy in lead roles. The film was theatrically released on 6 March 2026.

== Cast ==
- Rachitha Mahalakshmi as Sangeetha
- M. S. Moorthy as Moorthy
- Sabari as Guna
- Rohinth Chellappa as Karan
- Swetha Dorathy as Ranjitha
- Pawan Krishna
- K. R. Vijaya
- P. L. Thenappan as priest
- K. S. G. Venkatesh as doctor
- Sridhar in a cameo appearance

== Production ==
The film was written and directed by M. S. Moorthy, who also serves as the producer and music composer. Cinematography was handled by Seviloraja, and editing by Dv. Meenakshisundar. Ravi Bhargavan worked as the creative director.

== Reception ==
Virakesari wrote that the number 99/66 is beyond the limits of the audience's connection. Maalai Malar wrote that through the film, the director has also tried to convey the idea that crimes against women and the perpetrators should be punished.
