= Kalathu Veedu =

- களத்து வீடு
- Genre: Soap opera
- Directed by: Arul Raj
- Starring: Shankara Pandian; Devipriya; Sivan Srinivasan; Anila; Manickam; Rajesh; Gayathri
- Theme music composer: Ilayavan
- Composer: Ilayavan
- Country of origin: India
- Original language: Tamil
- No. of seasons: 1
- No. of episodes: 102

Production
- Production locations: Theni district Madurai
- Cinematography: Sai Srinivas
- Editor: Sajin C
- Camera setup: Multi-camera
- Running time: approx. 20-22 minutes per episode

Original release
- Network: Vijay TV
- Release: 2 November 2015 – 25 March 2016

Kalathu Veedu (transl.The War House) is a 2015 Indian-Tamil soap opera that aired Monday through Friday on Vijay TV from 2 November 2015 to 25 March 2016 at 6:30PM IST for 102 episodes. The show starred Shankara Pandian, Devipriya, Sivan Srinivasan, Anila, Manickam, Rajesh, Gayathri and directed by Arul Raj.

== Plot ==
The Kalathu Veedu family, of the village head Sivan Kaalai is a renowned and influential family of a village near Madurai, Ponraasu, the head of the Kaara Veedu is jealous of Sivankaalai and wants to defame him at any cost.

Panchavarnam, the head of the Karma Veedu whose father was punished for stealing, by Sivan Kaalai's father, also seeks to destroy the Kalathu Veedu family. Thus, with a joint plan, the duo join hands to defame and break the Kalathu Veedu. Their efforts bear fruit, and the family is broken and shattered.

But on his death bed, the Kalathu Veedu head, Sivankaalai, calls his youngest son Jeeva, who is a filmmaker now, to reunite the family and bring back the fame and glory of the Kalathu Veedu. How Jeeva overcomes obstacles to achieve these goals and make his father's last wish come true, is the story.

== Cast ==
- Shankara Pandian
- Devipriya as (Salangai Oli Nattiyakkuzhu)
- Sivan Srinivasan
- Anila
- Manickam
- Rajesh
- Gayathri Yuvraaj as Pusphavali
- Hema Rajkumar
- Manoharan
- Balan
- Jeethu
- Perumayi
- Reema
- Sampath
- Shanthi
- Jayaprakash
- Prabhu Kodikkulam
- Kannan
- Karthi Madurai
