= Venkat Subha =

Indian actor, writer, and producer (died 2021)

- Died: 29 May 2021; Chennai, India
- Occupation: Actor
- Years active: 2004–2021

Venkat Subha (died 29 May 2021) was an Indian actor who worked in Tamil films and television.

== Career ==
He was initially seen in roles in films such as Azhagiya Theeye (2004), Kanda Naal Mudhal (2005) and Mozhi (2007). He also acted in few television soap operas including Nachiyarpuram, Thirumagal, Priyamanaval. In 2020, he pulled out from acting in the Vijay TV Tamil soap opera Pandian Stores midway for personal reasons and was replaced by Ravi Chandran.

He also served as a YouTube reviewer for the Touring Talkies channel giving his insights and opinions about the film receptions. He would be seen posthumously in the film Friendship.

== Death ==
Subha died on 29 May 2021, from COVID-19 during the COVID-19 pandemic in India. He had been admitted to a private hospital in Chennai after testing positive for the virus.

== Filmography ==
- Azhagiya Theeye (2004) (uncredited)
- Kanda Naal Mudhal (2005) (uncredited)
- Mozhi (2007) (uncredited)
- Masala Padam (2015)
- Velainu Vandhutta Vellaikaaran (2016)
- Kattappava Kanom (2017)
- Si3 (2017)
- Rum (2017)
- Kadugu (2017)
- Ivan Thanthiran (2017)
- Ghajinikanth
- Seethakaathi (2018)
- Kazhugu 2
- Gorilla
- Oru Pakka Kathai (2020)
- Mirugaa (2021)
- Operation JuJuPi (2021)
- Friendship (2021)

=== Television ===
- Pandian Stores
- Chithi 2
- Thirumagal
- Priyamanaval
- Nachiyarpuram
