= Hendithghelthini =

Hendthigheltheeni
- Directed by: Dinesh Babu
- Written by: Dinesh Babu
- Produced by: V. P. Gyaneshwar; V. S. Mani; C. R. Gopi
- Starring: Vishnuvardhan; Suhasini; Kashi; Vanishree; Baby Ramya
- Cinematography: Dinesh Babu
- Edited by: B. S. Kemparaj
- Music by: V. Manohar
- Release date: 1998
- Running time: 145 min
- Country: India
- Language: Kannada

Hendithghelthini, also known as Hendthigheltheeni, (Kannada: ಹೆಂಡ್ತಿಗ್ಹೇಳ್ತೀನಿ) is a 1998 Kannada comedy film written and directed by Dinesh Baboo. It stars Vishnuvardhan, Suhasini in leading roles. Kashi, Vanishree, Baby Ramya, Tara, B. V. Radha, Ramakrishna played pivotal roles.

== Plot ==
The movie is about a couple who are unable to have children. The hero legally adopts a child and plans to surprise his wife by claiming the child to be a daughter of his friend so that once bon homie builds, he can surprise her with the truth. But, once he reaches his house, he is astonished to see another child of same age has already come to his house claiming to be his friend's daughter repeating the exact lines which he had taught his adopted daughter.

== Cast ==
- Vishnuvardhan as Jayaram
- Suhasini Maniratnam as Radha Jayaram
- Sanketh Kashi as Raghava
- Vanishree as Deepthi Raghava
- B. V. Radha as chief of orphanage
- Tara as Seetha
- Sihi Kahi Chandru as Ramakrishna
- Ramakrishna as don
- Pavitra Lokesh as Nandini Chandrashekhar
- Ramya as Nancy Decosta
- Raksha Holla (credited as Baby Raksha)

== Soundtrack ==
The music of the film was composed by V. Manohar.

Track listing
| No. | Title | Lyrics | Singer(s) | Length |
|---|---|---|---|---|
| 1. | "Cheluvu Cheluve" | V. Manohar | Rajesh Krishnan |
| 2. | "Chinnari Chinnari" | V. Manohar | K. S. Chithra |
| 3. | "Suvvale Suvvale" | V. Manohar | Rajesh Krishnan |
| 4. | "Hasya Geethe" | V. Manohar | Shankar Shanbhag |
