= Tamil Kadavul Murugan =

- Genre: Soap opera Mythology
- Created by: Nikhil Sinha; Sohana Sinha (supervisor)
- Based on: Kandha Puranam
- Screenplay by: Abiram; Aravind Ganesh; Neelakantan
- Story by: Umesh Upadhyay
- Directed by: Deepak Garg (show); Nitin Gopi (episode)
- Creative directors: Amit Bhargav; Vinayak Jain (HOP)
- Starring: Sasindhar Pushpalingam; Raksha Holla; Priya Prince; Anirudh
- Theme music composer: Karthikeya Murthy; Dev Sikdar
- Country of origin: India
- Original language: Tamil
- No. of episodes: 119

Production
- Executive producer: Vinayak Jain
- Producer: Nikhil Sinha
- Editor: Hemanth Kumar
- Camera setup: Multi-camera
- Running time: Episodes 1–59: approx. 45–50 minutes per episode (2.10.2017–22.12.2017); Episodes 60–104: approx. 20–22 minutes per episode (25.12.2017–2018)
- Production company: Triangle Film Company

Original release
- Network: Star Vijay; Hotstar
- Release: 2 October 2017 – 23 February 2018

Tamil Kadavul Murugan is a 2017 Tamil-language mythology soap opera based on the life of the Hindu deity Murugan. It began airing on 2 October 2017 on Vijay TV every Monday to Friday, replacing Bigg Boss Tamil. Season 1 ended with 104 episodes from 23 February 2018. Season 2 aired from 5 May 2018 to 19 May 2018 only on Hotstar for 15 episodes.

== Plot and story ==
This story shows about the life of Lord Murugan and about the Asura Surapadma. And this story will end with Sura Samhaaram.

Surapadman and his sister Aja Mukhi caused endless troubles to Murugan in his childhood. He sent countless asuras to destroy Murugan but all in vain. Murugan escaped each time when they tried to destroy him.

=== Murugan's childhood – season 1 ===
Murugan was created from Shiva's third eye and 6 sparks flew out and became babies on the Saravana River. Karthigai Women brought up Murugan( in the form of six children). They taught Asthras and Shastras to Murugan. Later on, Goddess Parvati became the mother when she joined the six children and that's how Murugan is known as Arumugam. Later the six Karthigai Women were blessed and became the Karthigai Nakshatram.

During one episode, Narada brought a Gnanapazham(ஞானப்பழம்) or Fruit of Knowledge and said that this competition is between Murugan and Ganesha. In this competition who goes around bhoomi or the Earth 3 times would win this fruit. Murugan started this journey while Ganesha didn't start. He started to go around his parents Shiva and Parvati 3 times (As circulating them is equal to rounding the earth). After Murugan finished the contest and returned to get the prize, he was disappointed with what Ganesha did. He was very angry with him and his parents. So he left Kailayam to find a place for himself with peace and he headed south – Tamil Nadu. He then found a place for himself, which is Palani(பழனி). Devas blessed him there and that place became divine place. At a stage, Tamil poet Nakkeeran and other poets were captured by Andasuran. He was an Asura who wanted his own language Karkhimukhi Jwala to exist. So he opposed Tamil-language and its popularity. Murugan fought with that Asura and helped Tamil poets get freedom. As a result of this, Tamil kings like Pallavas and Cholas praised him as Tamizh Kadavul Murugan or God of Tamils as he was the saviour of Tamil language.

To make Murugan to return to Kailayam, Shiva sent Avvaiyar Paati to convince Murugan. And when Murugan saw Avvaiyar, he tested her with some questions. When she asked about him and his problems, Murugan said everything that happened. So, Avvaiyar praised and advised Murugan. He then got convinced and realized his mistake and then returned to Kailayam.

=== Sura Samhaaram ===
Slowly, Murugan became an adult to be capable of fighting with Asuras. He sought the blessings of his parents, Parvati and Shiva. He then proceeded towards Mayapuri and invited Surapadma. In this battle, he fought with Tarakasuran and finally he killed him. Unable to bear his brother's death, Surapadma sent Kavundasuran to encounter Murugan. Murugan discussed war tactics with Devas and that Asura was also killed.

Other Devas were worried about their victory. They pleaded with Shiva and Shiva called for Veerabaahu to support Murugan in the war. Veerabahu requested Surapadman to avoid the war. But Surapadman refused his request. The battle continued. After a day of battle, Parvati gifted Murugan with a Sakthivel.

In the last day of battle, Murugan, with the help of Devas and Veerabahu, killed Surapadman.

== Seasons overview ==
| Season | Episodes | Originally aired | | Time |
| Season | Episodes | First aired | Last aired | Time |
|---|---|---|---|---|
| 1 | 104 | 2 October 2017 | 23 February 2018 | Monday – Friday; 21:00 (IST); 18:00 (IST |
| 2 | 15 | 5 May 2018 | 19 May 2018 | only Hotstar |

== Cast ==
- Master Anirudh as Murugan
  - Pavan Madhukar as Adult Murugan
- Sasindhar Pushpalingam as Shiva /Veerabhadra
- Priya Prince as Goddess Parvathi / Durga / Adi Parashakti / Dakshayani
- Raanav as Veera Kesari Member of Navaveerargal (One of the Nine Warriors of Lord Muruga)
- Raksha Holla as Ajamukhi
- Nizam as Singhamukha
- Mukesh Khanna as Hiranyakashipu
- Dev Saran/ Tirth Solanki as Lord Ganesha
- Jaswant Sivakumar as Vishnu
- Ananth as Brahma
- Jayalakshmi as Lakshmi
- Ammu Ramachandran as Saraswati
- --- as Sage Agasthya
- --- as Narada Muni
- Priyadharshini as Ganga
- Krish as Devendran
- Srikumar as Agnidevan
- Rakesh Venugopal as Vayudevan
- Nagashree as Indrani
- Dinesh Shyam as Nandhi
- Rizwan Daul as Jayanta
- Rashmi Raj as Nidardani
- --- as Dhakshan
- Ramesh Kumar as Yama
- --- as Nakkeeran
- Arun Kumar Rajan as Veerabahu (episodes 114–116)
- Kovai Kamala as Avvaiyar
- Nagaraj as Chitragupta
- --- as Idumban
- Subathira as Soorasai
- Sakthi Saravanan as Mahishasura
- Vetri Velan as Śūrapadmān
- --- as Banukopan
- Rihanshi Gowda / Meenakshi as Queen Padumakomalai
- Birla Bose as Tārakāsuran
- Harsha Sharma (child actor) as Ilvalan
- Design Raj as Asura Guru Shukracharyar
- Anandha Krishnan as Asura Senapathy
- Uruthiran

== Awards and nominations ==
| Year | Award | Category | Recipient | Role | Result |
|---|---|---|---|---|---|
| 2018 | Galatta Nakshathra Awards | Best Child Actor | Anirudh | Murugan | Nominated |
| 2018 | 4th Vijay Television Awards | Best Child Actor | Anirudh | Murugan | Nominated |

== Dubbed version ==
- This serial is dubbed in Malayalam language airing on Asianet TV as Sree Murugan from 23 October 2017 on Monday to Friday at 6:00PM (IST).
- In Telugu language aired on Maa TV from 12 February on Monday to Friday at 17:30 (IST) as Sri Subramanya Charitham.
