= Kizhakku Vaasal (TV series) =

2023 Indian Tamil-language TV series

- Genre: Family; Drama
- Created by: Radhika Sarathkumar
- Written by: Guru Sampath Kumar
- Screenplay by: Guru Sampath Kumar
- Directed by: M.N Manoj Kumar
- Creative director: Radhika Sarathkumar
- Starring: Reshma Muralidharan; S. A. Chandrasekhar; Venkat Renganathan
- Theme music composer: M R
- Country of origin: India
- Original language: Tamil
- No. of episodes: 196

Production
- Producer: Radhika Sarathkumar
- Cinematography: R.V Parvati Krishna; P.Chella Pandiyan
- Editors: K. Bharath Kumar; G.Parthian Panthidurai
- Camera setup: Multi-camera
- Running time: 22mins per episode
- Production company: Radaan Mediaworks

Original release
- Network: Star Vijay TV; Disney + Hotstar
- Release: 7 August 2023 – 13 April 2024

Kizhakku Vaasal (transl. East Gate) is a 2023 Indian Tamil-language television series that aired on Star Vijay and streams on Disney + Hotstar. It is directed by M N Manoj Kumar and produced by Radhika Sarathkumar under the banner of Radaan Mediaworks.

The show stars Reshma Muralidharan, S. A. Chandrasekhar and Venkat Renganathan in lead roles. It aired from 7 August 2023 to 13 April 2024 on Monday to Friday.

The story was written by Guru Sampath Kumar. The cinematography of this serial was done by R. V. Parvati Krishna and P. Chella Pandiyan, while the editing was done by K. Bharath Kumar and G. Parthian Panthidurai.

== Storyline ==
The series centers on Renuka, the adopted daughter of Swamiappan and Sivagami. Swamiappan, a retired mechanic, and Sivagami, dote on her and consider her as their favourite child, even though she is adopted. Swamiappan's household includes his two biological sons, Natesan, an accountant, and Manickam, who works in a factory, their respective wives Parvathi and Maya as well as Natesan's and Parvathi's daughter Shraddha. Swamiappan's widowed sister Mangaiyakarasi and her children; Shanmugam, an autodriver, and Malar, a budding athlete, also live in the Swamiappan household.

Shanmugam has a one-sided love for Renuka and does whatever he can to help her. However, Renuka is in love with her cousin Arjun, who is the son of Sivagami's younger brother Dayalan, a reputed lawyer and industrialist, and Viji. Dayalan is money-minded and cruel, and hates Renuka, looks down upon Swamiappan for his lack of money, while treating Shanmugam worse than a servant due to his lack of education. During Swamiappan's 60th birthday celebration, Swamiappan proposes to Dayalan to fix the marriage between Renuka and Arjun, but Dayalan turns the proposal down, claiming that he cannot marry his son to someone whose past is unknown. This forces Swamiappan and Sivagami to disown Dayalan and his family, while Renuka begins to keep a distance from Arjun, even though both still have feelings for each other.

Following Renuka's graduation, Swamiappan is keen on her pursuing higher education, but she hesitates initially due to lack of financial support. Natesan, as well as Maya, who are both earning well, refuse to help her, jealous of the love and support she receives from the rest of the family despite being adopted, much to the chagrin of their respective spouses Parvathi and Manickam, who dote on her. Natesan and Maya also do not allow Parvathi and Manickam to help Renuka financially. However, when Dayalan insults Renuka in front of her entire family due to a misunderstanding involving Arjun, Renuka challenges him that she would study law and become a more successful lawyer than him.

She joins a law college and also works as a typist at a xerox shop part-time to pay her college fees. It is soon revealed that Renuka is the biological daughter of Panjali, a famous lawyer and social activist. Panjali had abandoned Renuka in a temple when she was an infant for hitherto unknown reasons. Swamiappan noticed Renuka and decided to take her home and raise her as her own child. However, both Panjali and the adult Renuka do not know that they are mother and daughter, though they cross paths a few times. After a lot of discussions, Renuka’s marriage with Arjun was planned which Arjun and Dayalan stopped due to their evil intentions on the last day. Following the same, Dayalan arranged a marriage with Panjali’s daughter Anu which Anu in turn stopped just like how Renuka’s marriage was stopped for Arjun and Dayalan to experience the same pain. Arjun starts to go against Anu. Meanwhile, she starts to gain feelings for Shanmugam but he rejects her proposal of love. Anu’s grandmother Annapoorni’s death results in Panjali to request Renuka to convince Shanmugam to marry Anu because Annapoorni’s death affected Anu’s mental health very badly.

== Cast ==
=== Main cast ===
- Reshma Muralidharan as Renuka (Swamiappan's adoptive daughter, Panjali's biological daughter)
- S. A. Chandrasekhar as Swamiappan (Renuka'a adoptive father, Sivagami's husband)
- Venkat Renganathan in a Dual Role as:
  - Shanmugam (Mangaiyakarasi's son, loves Renuka)
  - Shiva Shanmugam (Shanmugam's Half brother)

=== Supporting cast ===
- Sindhu Shyam as Panjali (Anu and Renuka's biological mother, Ravi’s wife)
- Chandralekha as Anu (Panjali's daughter, Renuka's sister, loves Shanmugam)
- Janaki Suresh as Sivagami (Swamiappan's wife, Dayalan's sister)
- Arun Kumar Rajan as Natesan (Swamiappan's son, Parvathi's husband)
- Ashwini Radhakrishna as Parvathi (Natesan's husband, Shraddha's mother)
- Shraddha as Shraddha (Parvathi and Natesan's daughter)
- Praveen Devasagayam as Manickam (Swamiappan's son, Maya's husband)
- Rojasree as Maya (Manickam's wife, School teacher)
- Anand Babu as Dayalan (Sivagami's brother, Arjun's father)
- Geetha Narayanan as Viji (Dayalan's wife, Arjun's mother)
- Dinesh Gopalsamy / Sasindhar Pushpalingam as Arjun (Dayalan and Viji's son, Renuka and Anu’s ex-fiance)
- Dharini as Mangaiyakarasi (Swamiappan's sister, Malar and Shanmugam's mother)
- Kiran Mai as Malar (Mangaiyakarasi's daughter, Shanmugam's sister)
- Shyamala as Annapoorni (Panjali's mother, Possessive over Panjali and Anu)
- Ravikanth as Ravi (Panjali's husband)

== Production ==
=== Development ===
Towards the end of January 2023, Radhika Sarathkumar confirmed through a press release that it would distribute a new Tamil serial for Star Vijay, which would be produced by herself under Radaan Mediaworks, and would also be an initial debut as a television actor for S. A. Chandrasekhar.

=== Casting ===
- S. A. Chandrasekhar was cast as a main role in the serial.
- Reshma Muralidharan and Sanjeev Venkat were cast as the follow-up main leads of the serial.
- It was announced on 20 April 2023 that Sanjeev Venkat would be quitting the serial.
- Sanjeev Venkat was replaced by Venkat Renganathan on 22 April 2023.
- It was officially announced that Sindhu Shyam was supposed to make an entry in the serial
- In December 2023, Dinesh Gopalsamy was replaced by Sasindhar Pushpalingam since he joined Bigg Boss.
