= Mella Thirandhathu Kadhavu (TV series) =

Indian Tamil language TV series

- Genre: Drama; Romance
- Based on: Cuckoo
- Written by: Brahma G. Dev
- Directed by: Brahma G. Dev
- Starring: Ashwanth Ashokkumar; Lisha; Venkat Renganathan; Gayathri Yuvraaj; Anu Sulash
- Country of origin: India
- Original language: Tamil
- No. of seasons: 2
- No. of episodes: 511

Production
- Producer: Shankar Venkataraman
- Editor: P.Arunkumar
- Camera setup: Multi-camera
- Running time: 22 minutes

Original release
- Network: Zee Tamil
- Release: 2 November 2015 – 27 October 2017

Mella Thiranthathu Kathavu (transl. The door opened slowly) is an Indian Tamil language TV series that aired on Zee Tamil. The show premiered on 2 November 2015 to 27 October 2017 with 511 episodes. It starring Ashwanth Ashokkumar and Lisha with Venkat Renganathan, Gayathri Yuvraaj and Anu Sulash. The Serial directed by Arul Raj Bramma G. Dev and producer by Shankar Venkataraman.

== Plot ==
=== Season 1 ===
The serial story about heart-warming love story between two visually challenged people- Santhosh and Selvi.

=== Season 2 ===
The second season, titled Mella Thirandhathu Kadhavu; Iru Minmipochikalin Kathai, Junior Super Stars fame Ashwanth Ashokkumar and Lisha doing lead role.

== Cast ==
=== Season 1 ===
- Santhosh (Epi: 1-230) / Venkat Renganathan (From Epi 231) as Santhosh
- Sreethu Krishnan (Epi 1-256) / Gayathri Yuvraaj (From Epi 256) as Selvi
- Anu Sulash as Maya
- K K Menon
- Hema Rajkumar
- Pavithra Janani

=== Season 2 ===
- Lisha as Anjali
- Ashwanth Ashokkumar as Ashwanth
- Gayathri Yuvraaj as Manju /Selvi / Anjamma
- Venkat Renganathan as Santhosh
- Anu Sulash as Maya
- Nathan Shyam as Gowtham
- Akila as Priya
- Jeevitha as Deepa
- Poovilangu Mohan

== Seasons overview ==
Season	Episodes	First aired	Last aired
1	315	2 November 2015	20 January 2017
2	236	23 January 2017	27 October 2017
