= Xtreme (2025 film) =

2025 Tamil crime thriller film

- Theatrical release poster
- Directed by: Rajavel Krishna
- Written by: Rajavel Krishna
- Produced by: Kamalakumari; Rajkumar
- Starring: Rachitha Mahalakshmi; Abi Nakshathra
- Cinematography: DJ Bala
- Edited by: Ram Gopi
- Music by: RS Raj Prathap
- Production company: Sieger Pictures
- Release date: 3 January 2025
- Running time: 122 minutes
- Country: India
- Language: Tamil

Xtreme is a 2025 Indian Tamil-language suspense crime thriller film written and directed by Rajavel Krishna and produced by Kamalakumari and Rajkumar under Sieger Pictures banner. The film stars Rachitha Mahalakshmi, Abi Nakshathra, Rajkumar, Ananth Nag and Amritha Halder in the lead roles. The technical team consists of cinematographer DJ Bala, editor Ram Gopi and music composer RS Raj Prathap.

Xtreme was released in theatres on 3 January 2025.

== Plot ==
A young girl is brutally raped and murdered and is found concealed within a building column at a construction site. The victim is soon revealed to be Divya. Divya hails from a lower-middle-class family; her mother, Alamelu, works as a maid for Shreya's family in a luxurious apartment. Shreya, a feminist, encourages Divya to wear modern attire, disregarding societal norms and expectations. The apartment's residents, including elderly men, support Shreya's progressive views. Shruthi, a newly appointed Sub-Inspector, is tasked with investigating Divya's murder alongside Inspector Sathiyaseelan. Sathiyaseelan, Shruthi's brother-in-law, struggles with anger issues stemming from the tragic loss of his toddler daughter, Sahana. His inability to cope with his emotions led to his separation from his wife.

Sathiyaseelan and Shruthi initiate their investigation at the construction site, followed by a visit to Shreya's apartment, where Divya was last seen. CCTV footage leads them to a group of drug addicts who allegedly abused Divya, residing in her locality. However, forensic tests prove their innocence. Further investigation points to the school principal's brother, a known drug addict. Upon re-examining the CCTV footage, Shruthi and Sathiyaseelan discovered discrepancies: Divya changed clothes before exiting the apartment, and the security personnel's reported exit time was false.

A flashback reveals that Shreya had offered Divya her clothes after noticing Divya's torn dress. Additionally, Jeeva, Shreya's lover, had gifted Divya an expensive phone, sparking Shreya's possessiveness and subtle anger towards Jeeva. This leads the police to arrest Jeeva and his friends for questioning. However, the inquiry proves their innocence, and they are released. Divya's community members, led by Thiru, organize a protest demanding Jeeva's arrest, attracting public attention and calling for Sathiyaseelan's removal, accusing him of favoring Jeeva. So, Sathiyaseelan motivates Shruthi to take charge of the case. Meanwhile, Sathiyaseelan, with Jeeva's assistance, identifies a drug peddler who owns a water packaging company. This individual had previously protested against Sathiyaseelan. The inspector reveals that he had already suspected a connection between Divya's murder and the drug peddling operation run by the water packaging company owner, Thiru.

Thiru confesses that Divya had discovered his illegal drug peddling activities, prompting him and his accomplices to murder her. Jeeva and Sathiyaseelan confront the perpetrators, and in a subsequent encounter, Sathiyaseelan eliminates Thiru and his men, bringing justice to Divya's family. In a twist, Shruthi and Sathiyaseelan apprehend the four elderly men from Shreya's apartment, revealing them to be Divya's rapists. The investigation uncovers that these men had assaulted Divya and, when she escaped, they colluded with Thiru to silence her. Thiru's motive was twofold: not only had Divya discovered his drug peddling operation, but she had also reported it to the authorities.

The elderly perpetrators' arrest has a profound impact on Shreya, who undergoes a transformation in her perspective on her dressing sense and becomes aware of the predatory gaze surrounding her. Also, Shruthi's sister reunites with her husband, Sathiyaseelan.

== Cast ==
- Rachitha Mahalakshmi as SI Shruthi
- Abi Nakshathra as Divya
- Rajkumar as Inspector Sathiyaseelan
- Amritha Halder as Shreya
- Kamalathmika as Sahana
- Ananth Nag as Jeeva

== Production ==
A launch event was conducted in Chennai on 29 January 2024 announcing television actress Rachitha Mahalakshmi of Saravanan Meenatchi and Bigg Boss 6 fame in the lead role for the upcoming crime thriller film Xtreme. The film is said to be written and directed by Rajavel Krishna who earlier directed Pizhai (2020) and Thuval (2024) and produced by Kamalakumari and Rajkumar under Sieger Pictures banner. The film also stars Ayali (2023) fame Abi Nakshathra, Rajkumar, Amritha Halder, Rithkrithi, Ananth Nag and others in pivotal roles. The technical team consists of cinematographer DJ Bala, editor Ram Gopi and music composer RS Raj Prathap. On 9 December 2024, the pre-release event was held in Chennai.

== Release ==
Xtreme released in theatres on 3 January 2025. Earlier it was initially scheduled for 20 December 2024.

== Reception ==
A critic of Dinamalar gave 2.75/5 stars, praising the performances of Rachitha, Abi Nakshatra and Rajkumar, but criticized the melodrama and the making of the film. A critic of Maalaimalar gave 2.5/5 stars, praising the performances of the cast but criticized the screenplay.
