= Chackoyum Maryyum =

- Genre: Soap opera
- Created by: Murali Nellanadu
- Written by: Murali Nellanadu
- Directed by: Niju Soman
- Creative director: Sajeendran Thamaraserry
- Opening theme: Rajeev Attukal
- Country of origin: India
- Original language: Malayalam
- No. of seasons: 2
- No. of episodes: 261

Production
- Executive producer: Dileep Shukoor
- Producer: NIL
- Cinematography: Alok Adik
- Editor: Kapil
- Camera setup: Surya Vision
- Running time: 20–22 minutes

Original release
- Network: Mazhavil Manorama
- Release: 21 October 2019 – 4 December 2020

Chackoyum Maryyum (Malayalam: ചാക്കോയും മേരിയും, lit. 'Chacko And Mary') is an Indian Malayalam television series being premiered on Mazhavil Manorama since 21 October 2019.

== Synopsis ==
The life of Kuriachan, who lives with his wife and children, takes a drastic turn when Rajalakshmi entrusts him with Chacko, her illegitimate son. He is the son of Raja Lakshmi and her secret boyfriend. Right before her wedding, Raja Lakshmi requests her childhood friend Kuriyachan to take care Chakko for some time. Kuriyachan, who is the father of three kids, agrees to take care of the baby boy. Gradually, Kuriyachan realises that he was tricked by Raja Lakshmi and ended up being the caretaker of little Chakko.

== Cast ==
Lead Cast

- Akash Mahesh / Sajin John as Chacko
  - Illegitimate son of Rajalekshmi and Gautam, raised by Kuriachan and Alice
- VK Baiju as Kuriachan
  - Foster father of Chacko
- Monisha Arshak as Neelambari
  - Care taker and lover of Chacko
- Neena Kurup as Alice
  - Kuriachan's wife
- Aparnadevi as Mary
- Neerada Sheen as Sandra IPS
- Neelima Rani / Devi Ajith as Rajalekshmi
  - Chacko's biological mother
- Mithun as Xavier
  - Elder Son of Kuriachan and Alice
- Archana Suseelan as Jiny
  - Xavier's wife
- Ajoobsha as Sunny
  - Younger son of Kuriachan and Alice
- Balachandran Chullikkadu as Sharmaji
  - Rajalakshmi's right-hand man
- Joemon Joshy as Alen
  - Elsa's College Lecturer

Recurring Cast

- _______ as Mariya
- Chilanka S Deedu as Elsa
- Tony as Adv.Mohanachandran
- Vijayalakshmi
- Rajesh Hebbar as Chandrasenan
- Bindu Ramakrishnan as Chandrasenan's mother
- Divya M Nair as Treesa
- Rohit as Gautam
- E.K.Rajendran as Varkkichan
- Kottayam Manju as Lissy
- _____ as Baby
- Anzil Rehman as Jomy
- Deepika Mohan as Sreedevi (Rajalakshmi's Mother)
- Saniya Babu as Elsa
- Amith as Aravindan
- _____ as Gayathri
- Harisree Martin as Street singer
- Jolly Easow as Aalungal Ammachi (Cathrine Amma)
- Lissy Jose as Tresia Chedathi
- ____ as Xavier
- Santhakumari as Eliyamma
- Sajna Firoz
- Baby Megha Mahesh as Sara
