= God Father (2020 film) =

Indian Tamil film

- Theatrical release poster
- Directed by: Jegan Rajshekar
- Written by: Jegan Rajshekar
- Produced by: Rajkumar; Ajith Vasudev
- Starring: Natty; Lal; Ananya
- Cinematography: N. Shanmuga Sundaram
- Edited by: Bhuvan Srinivasan
- Music by: Naviin Ravindren; Vibin R
- Production companies: GS Arts; First Clap
- Release date: 21 February 2020
- Running time: 112 minutes
- Country: India
- Language: Tamil

God Father is a 2020 Tamil survival action thriller film directed by Jegan Rajshekar and co-produced by Rajkumar and Ajith Vasudev. The film starring Natty, Lal, and Ananya has the music composed by Naviin Ravindren.

== Plot ==
Adhiyamaan (Natty), a young middle class office goer, is a contented man who lives with his loving wife Mithra (Ananya) and adorable son Arjun (Ashwanth Ashokkumar) in a multi-storeyed apartment. Life goes smoothly for Adhi until one day, he unknowingly falls in dreaded gangster Marudhu's (Lal) trap.

Marudhu's young son has a malfunctioning heart, and doctors say he can only be saved with a heart transplant. But the problem is to find a donor matching his age and blood group. Marudhu sends his henchmen out to check various hospital records to locate a suitable kid. Arjun's stats match his son's needs. So he decides to kill Arjun and harvest his heart for his son. Thus begins a survival drama, which largely takes place within an apartment complex. How Adhi uses his wits to save his child forms the rest of the story.

== Cast ==
- Natty as Adhiyamaan
- Lal as Marudhu Singam
- Ananya as Mithra
- Ashwanth Ashokkumar as Arjun
- G. Marimuthu as Police Inspector
- R. S. Shivaji as Adhi's neighbor
- Pradeep K Vijayan as Vasu

== Production ==
This film marks the return of Ananya to Tamil cinema after a hiatus. The trailer was released on 6 January 2020 by Santhanam and Karthik Subbaraj.

== Release ==
The film was released on 21 February 2020.

=== Critical response ===
Both the Deccan Chronicle and The Times of India gave the film two-and-a-half out of five stars. The Deccan Chronicle praised the performances of the cast and criticized the screenplay, saying that "However, had he had a tauter screenplay and closed all logical loopholes, the film would have made a difference". Similarly, The Times of India criticized the predictable screenplay and wrote that "But the biggest issue is how reveals the surprises in the name of foreshadowing. Rather than subtly introduce these elements into the plot, he underlines the moments".
