= Bimba (film) =

- DVD cover
- Directed by: Kavitha Lankesh
- Written by: Kavitha Lankesh
- Produced by: Kavitha Lankesh
- Starring: Raksha Holla; Daisy Bopanna; Prakash Raj; Sampath Kumar
- Cinematography: H. M. Ramachandra
- Edited by: M. N. Swamy
- Music by: Isaac Thomas Kottukapally
- Production company: Chinni Creations
- Release date: 14 May 2004
- Country: India
- Language: Kannada

Bimba (The Image) is a 2004 Indian Kannada-language children's drama film directed and produced by Kavitha Lankesh under Chinni Creations. It stars Raksha Holla, Daisy Bopanna, Prakash Raj and Sampath Kumar.

The film follows a rising child artiste Indu, who gets exploited into the glamorous world of cinema. The film won two Karnataka State Film Awards: Best Female Child Actor for Raksha and Best Screenplay for Lankesh. It was selected for the Bangkok International Film Festival.

== Cast ==
- Raksha Holla (credited as Baby Raksha) as Indu
- Daisy Bopanna as Saroja
- Prakash Raj as Raj
- Sampath Kumar as Arvind
- Rekha as Bindu
- Damini as a mother
- Master Shreyas as Arjun
- Joe Simon as Film Director
- Rajendrakumar Arya as Director
- Sudha Rani as Dolly

== Production ==
The film began production in 2002 with Raksha playing the lead role of a child actor. It marked the debut of Daisy Bopanna and Sampath Kumar, who play Raksha's parents. Jayasri Devi was to produce the film before Lankesh herself decided to produce it. Prakash Raj, Ramesh Aravind and Prema were to play guest roles in the film although Ramesh and Prema did not feature. Hamsalekha was originally supposed to compose the music but he was replaced by Isaac Thomas Kottukapally.

== Release and reception ==
Although Bimba was Lankesh's third film, it ended up releasing after her fourth, Preethi Prema Pranaya (2003).

A critic from Deccan Herald wrote that "There are also many films earlier which focus on the darker side of filmdom. But, Kavitha Lankesh’s Bimba stands out among them as it focuses on child artists in cinema. Perhaps, it may be the first Kannada film to do so". A critic from indiainfo wrote that "Overall BIMBA is a film that makes one ponder about the problems faced by child artists".
