= Ashwanth Ashokkumar =

Indian child actor

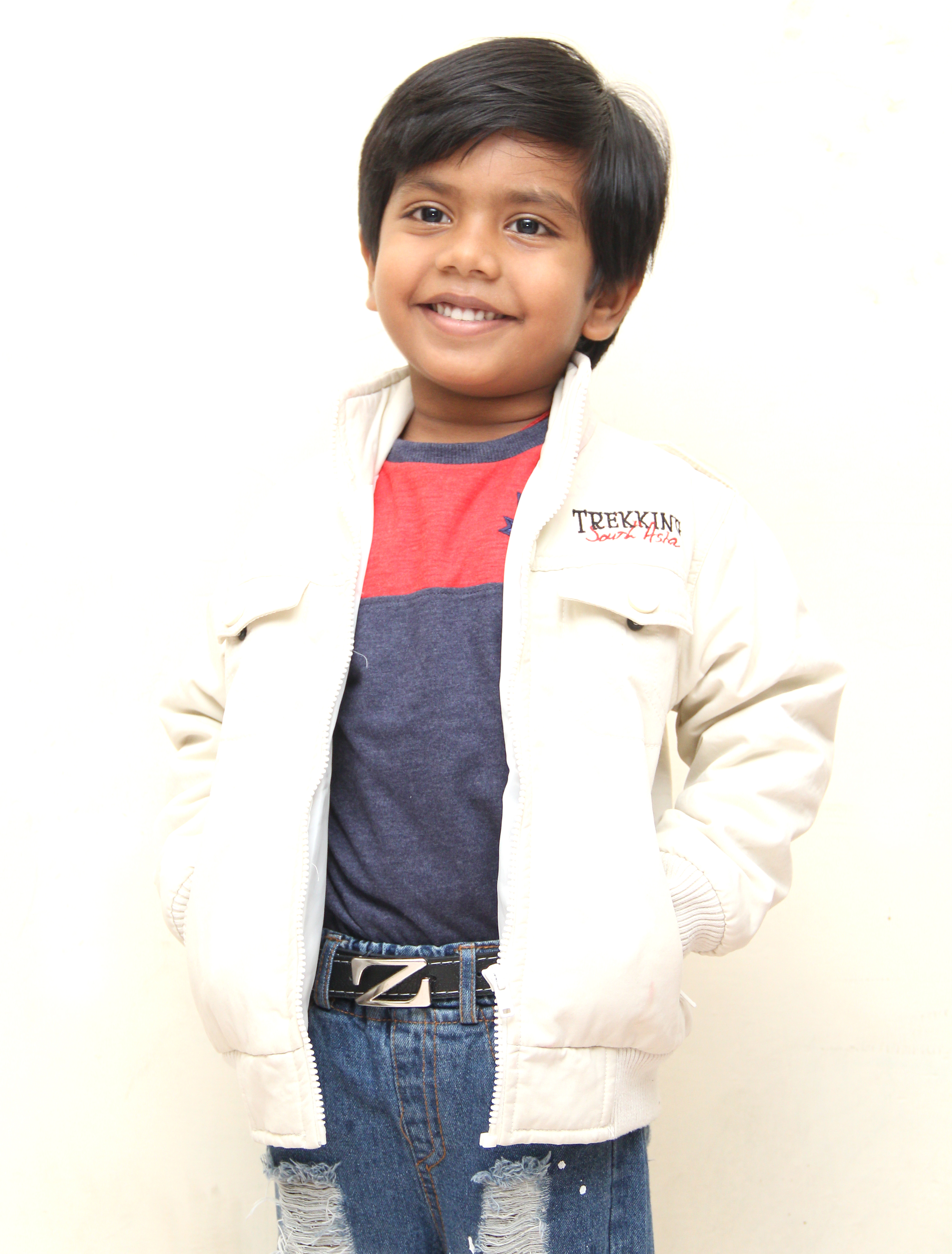
- Ashwanth at Junior Super Star
- Occupation: Child actor
- Years active: 2016–present

Ashwanth Ashokkumar is an Indian child actor who works in Tamil-language films. In 2016, he participated in the show Junior Super Star in Zee Tamil and won the title. He is known for his role as Rasukutty in Super Deluxe (2019).

== Career ==
In 2016, he participated in the show Junior Super Star, a show which tests kids' acting capabilities, on Zee Tamil along with Lisha. He won the season title of the show. Lisha and Ashwanth went on to star in Zee Tamil's television series, Mella Thirandhathu Kadhavu. He starred in Airaa (2019) before getting his breakthrough in Super Deluxe that same year. In Super Deluxe, he played Rasukutty, a child who still cares for his father, Manickam (Vijay Sethupathi) after he declares himself as a woman, Shilpa. He landed the role after the makers saw his performance on Junior Super Star. Ashwanth was offered a role in Mersal (2017), but didn't take the offer. He played supporting roles in several films including Thambi (2019) before playing one of the lead roles in God Father (2020). In 2020, he directed a children's stop-motion web series titled Ondipulli. He has given a voice-over during the episodes in addition to writing the series. His upcoming films include Jagame Thandhiram and an untitled film with Balaji Sakthivel.

== Filmography ==
=== Films ===
Year	Film	Role	Notes
2018	Sandakozhi 2	Sembaruthi's brother	
2019	Airaa	Babloo	
2019	Super Deluxe	Rasukutty	
2019	Vennila Kabaddi Kuzhu 2	Young Saravanan	
2019	Action	Ashwanth	
2019	Thambi	Kutta	
2020	God Father	Arjun	
2020	Jagame Thandhiram	Dheeran	
2022	My Dear Bootham	Thirunavukarasu	
2022	The Legend	Thirupathi's son	
2023	Bagheera	Young Prabhu	
2024	Jolly O Gymkhana	Church assistant	

=== Television ===
Year	Name	Role	Notes
2016	Junior Super Star	Contestant	Season winner
2017	Mella Thirandhathu Kadhavu	Ashwanth	Season 2 only
2017	Junior Senior	Contestant	
2017	Zee Dance League	Contestant	
2019	Genes	Guest	One episode only
2022	Half Pants Full Pants	Anand Subbarao aka Dabba	Hindi series

=== Web series ===
Year	Name	Role	Notes
2020	Ondipulli	All animals	Voice only; also director and writer
2021	Sodhanai Mael Sodhinai	Ashwanth	

== Awards and nominations ==
Year	Award	Category	Work	Result	Ref.
2018	Galatta Nakshatra Awards	Best Child Artist	Mella Thirandhathu Kadhavu	Nominated	
2020	Zee Cine Awards Tamil	Best Child Artist	Super Deluxe	Won	
2020	Edison Awards	Best Child Artist	Super Deluxe	Won	
