= My Dear Bootham (film) =

- Theatrical release Poster
- Directed by: N. Ragavan
- Written by: N. Ragavan
- Produced by: Ramesh P Pillai
- Starring: Prabhu Deva; Ashwanth Ashokkumar
- Cinematography: U. K. Senthil Kumar
- Edited by: San Lokesh
- Music by: D. Imman
- Production company: Abhishek Films
- Distributed by: Sri Lakshmi Jyothi Creations (Telangana and Andhra Pradesh)
- Release date: 15 July 2022
- Country: India
- Language: Tamil

My Dear Bootham (transl. My Dear Genie) is a 2022 Indian Tamil-language children's fantasy comedy film written and directed by N. Ragavan, and produced by Ramesh P. Pillai under the banner of Abhishek Films. It stars Prabhu Deva as the title role with Ashwanth Ashokkumar.

The film was released in theatres on 15 July 2022 and opened to mixed reviews from critics and audiences, with praise for the social message and Prabhu Deva and Ashwanth's performance.

== Plot ==
In the genie world, the King of all, Karkimuki, is sad as he does not have a son. After praying to Lord Murugan, he gets a son. He shows all the love he suppressed these years and loves him unconditionally. One day, his son asks him to take him to the planet where Siddhars live, so Karkimuki takes him there. Accidentally, his son enters a deep burrow to hide from his father, where he disturbs a Siddhar's thavam that has been continuing for thousand years. The angry Siddhar wakes up and curses Karkimuki. He says he will send Karkimuki to Earth as a statue until someone releases him. The person who releases him has to say a mandaram for Karkimuki to return to the Genie World within 48 days, or he will perish in the air.

Thirunavukarusu (Thiru) is an ordinary kid who has a stammering problem after an accident that killed his dad. Because of this, he gets bullied in school by his classmates and the teachers who do not allow him to read out loud due to his stammering problem. Even the shopkeeper is impatient to listen to what Thiru wants to buy, so he asks him to write down whatever he wants. His mother does not listen either but loves him dearly.

One day on a school trip, a dog chases Thiru and he falls into a ditch, where he finds a doll and releases Karkimuki. Karkimuki calls Thiru as Deivam and scares Thiru. Karkimuki follows Thiru home, only for Thiru to realise only he can see the genie. Eventually, they become friends, and Thiru plays a joke on everyone who used to make fun of him. He asks all his wishes to Karkimuni and has fun. When the teacher announces an inter-school speaking contest, Thiru wishes to participate but gets scared because of his stammer. He asks Karkimuki to get rid of stammer, and Karkimuni agrees. He starts speaking at the contest only to start stammering again.

Thiru gets upset and cries on the stage, wetting his pants. His mum is helpless and comforts him. Thiru does not go to school for the next few days and decides to stay home. Thiru shouts at Karkimuki for tricking him, and Karkimuki apologises, saying genies have some rules they must never break, such as never bringing someone from the dead, never stopping time and never curing problems related to the mind. Karkimuki says Thiru has a problem related to his mind and not a health condition. Thiru tells Karkimuki never to speak to him again. During a robbery, Karkimuki saves Thiru's mum, so they become friends again. Karkimuki encourages him to ignore everyone and to go to school, so he decides to go but promises his mum he will never do anything without telling his mum first.

At school, there is another contest, and Thiru manages to win first prize, shocking everyone who underestimates him. He hides this from his mum since he thinks she will get mad at him. Thiru asks Karkimuki what he wants, and Karkimuki tells him everything that happened, bringing tears to Thiru. Thiru assures Karkimuki that he will say the mandaram and reunite him with his son. Day after day, he practices the mandaram but struggles. One day, as he is practising, his mum catches him and asks him what it is. He runs away, but she hits him and asks him. Watching this, Karkimuki reveals himself to her, and she gets scared. Karkimuki decides to go away as Thiru's mum is afraid. Later, Thiru shouts at his mum for sending the genie somewhere distant as he was the only person who patiently listened to him, and no one else listened to him, including her.

He runs up to the terrace to find Karkimuki slowly fading away. Thiru cries and gets angry when saying the mandaram. He finally manages to recite the mandaram, and it opens a portal for Karkimuki to go back to the genie world. As he is about to leave, a kite string out of nowhere flies across and slits the throat of Thiru's mum, thus killing her. Karkimuki watches as Thiru cries over his dead mum and decides to bring her back to life, which causes Karkimuki to die as he has disobeyed his rules. Thiru and his mum hugs in tears while Karkimuki vanishes, dancing happily. A final scene shows Thiru speaking in a contest without stammering.

== Cast ==
- Prabhu Deva as Karkimuki the genie
- Ashwanth Ashokkumar as Thirunavukarasu (Thiru)
- Remya Nambeesan as Thiru's Mother
- Shakthi Rithvik as Thiru's friend
- Saathvik as Thiru's friend
- Master Param Guganesh as Thiru's friend
- Aazhiya as Thiru's friend
- Samyuktha Shanmuganathan as Thiru's Teacher
- Imman Annachi as Shop Owner
- Swaminathan as Thirunavukarasu's Relative
- Suresh Chandra Menon as Doctor
- V. Irai Anbu as Himself

== Music ==
My Dear Bootham

Soundtrack album by D. Imman
- Released: 17 July 2022
- Recorded: 2021–2022
- Studios: D. Imman Sound Factory, Chennai
- Genre: Feature film soundtrack
- Language: Tamil
- Label: Think Music
- Producer: D. Imman

D. Imman chronology
Yutha Satham (2022)	My Dear Bootham (2022)	Poikkal Kudhirai (2022)

Singles from My Dear Bootham
- 1. "Master Oh My Master" Released: 16 December 2021; 2. "Enakku Mattum Yean Yean" Released: 16 June 2022; 3. "Abacca Darru" Released: 7 July 2022

D. Imman composed the soundtrack and film's score marking the second collaboration with Prabhu Deva after Pon Manickavel. The entire soundtrack album was released on 17 July 2022 after the film's release.

All lyrics are written by Yugabharathi.

Track listing
No.	Title	Singer(s)	Length
1.	"Master Oh My Master"	Benny Dayal	4:22
2.	"Enakku Mattum Yean Yean"	Nakash Aziz	4:15
3.	"Abacca Darru"	Adithya Suresh, Sahana	3:50
4.	"Thangamey" (Version I)	Sean Roldan	4:37
5.	"Kinguda" (Additional lyrics and Rap by MC Rude)	Diwakar, MC Rude	3:36
6.	"Thangamey" (Version II)	Pradeep Kumar	4:37
7.	"Mind Sanity" (Instrumental)	-	3:35
8.	"Abandonment" (Instrumental)	-	2:10
9.	"Kids Party" (Instrumental)	-	3:26
10.	"The Genie" (Instrumental)	-	1:05
11.	"Thangamey" (Instrumental)	-	4:37

== Release and reception ==
The film released in theatres on 15 July 2022.

M. Suganth of The Times of India rated the film 2.5 out of 5 and wrote that "If the film works to the extent it does, it is mainly due to the two leads. Prabhudeva, who has often shown a flair for comedy, tries to elevate the material by giving his all, while Ashwath scores in the emotional moments, especially his monologue in the climax". Navein Darshan of Cinema Express gave 3.5 out of 5 stars and opined that "Fun-filled visuals and ideas make up for the sobby parts of this overly melodramatic film".

Dina Thanthi critic wrote that "The initial scenes of the film are creating a lot of anticipation. The following scenes don't make up for it." .Ananda Vikatan critic gave a mixed review.Zee News critic stated that " jolly ride with kids." Dinamalar critic gave 3 out of 5 rating.
