= Naam Iruvar Namakku Iruvar (TV series) =

Indian crime television series

- Season 2
- Genre: Family drama Action; Romance; Thriller
- Screenplay by: Sathriyan Ra; Praveen Sahadevan (Dialogue); E. Chandrasekar; K. Jayaprakash
- Directed by: Thai Selvam
- Starring: Mirchi Senthil; Raksha Holla; Rachitha Mahalakshmi; Rashmi Jayraj; Monisha Arshak; Bavithra; Sabitha Anand; Gayathri Yuvraaj; Raju Jeyamohan; Janani Ashok Kumar; Vaishnavi Arulmozhi
- Theme music composer: Ilayavan
- Country of origin: India
- Original language: Tamil
- No. of seasons: 2
- No. of episodes: 1055

Production
- Producers: Sai Ganesh Babu; Jagathilan
- Cinematography: Sa. Jayakumar
- Editor: P.M. Achuthan
- Camera setup: Multi-camera
- Running time: 22 minutes
- Production company: Fiction Team

Original release
- Network: Star Vijay
- Release: 26 March 2018 – 10 June 2022

Naam Iruvar Namakku Iruvar (We Two, For Us Two) is a 2018 Indian Tamil television series which premiered on Star Vijay and streams on Disney+ Hotstar. The first season followed the story of twin brothers Mayan and Aravind, both played by Mirchi Senthil. Then, the second season followed a different pair of twins: Mayan and Maaran, again played by Senthil.

The first season starred Senthil Kumar, Raksha Holla and Rashmi Jayraj. The second season stars Senthil Kumar, Rachitha Mahalakshmi, Monisha Arshak and Bavithra.

== Series overview ==
Series	Episodes	Originally released	
Series	Episodes	First released	Last released
1	579	26 March 2018	27 March 2020
2	476	27 June 2020	10 June 2022

== Plot ==
=== Season 1 ===
Identical twin brothers Aravind and Mayan are separated soon after birth; Aravind is given to a childless couple and raised in the city, and Mayan remains with his family in the village. Aravind learns that he was adopted, and sets out to meet his real parents and twin brother thirty years later. Sandhanapandi has been married twice. He has three children (Devi, Karthik and Vidhya) with his first wife, Valli, and a daughter (Thamarai) with Parvathy, his second wife.

A marriage is arranged between Aravind and Devi, but Aravind is kidnapped a few days before the wedding by Machakkalai, Parvathy's brother. He and Parvathy want to take revenge on Sandhanapandi by having Aravind marry Thamarai instead. Mayan assumes Aravind's identity and marries Devi, and Aravind is forced to marry Thamarai. Thamarai is not accepted by her mother-in-law, Gowri, and Mayan is not accepted by Devi's family. However, both make their respective spouses love them. Due to the COVID-19 pandemic, the season's production was forced to shut down on 26 March 2020.

=== Season 2 ===
Twin brothers Mayan and Maaran are separated at birth; their parents separate, and his mother leaves with Maaran. Mayan is angry with his father, Raja Rathinam, because he marries Naachiyar. He leaves the house and is raised by his uncle, Rathinavel, for over 25 years. Mayan falls in love with his cousin Mahalakshmi (Maha), a straightforward teacher who is Rathinavel's daughter. She dislikes him, despite Rathinavel's support.

Maha becomes engaged to Surya. Mayan tries to stop the wedding, succeeding when Surya's father incurs a large gambling debt. Rathinavel has a second heart attack, and refuses surgery. His doctor asks Maha and Mayan to keep him calm for a year, and Mayan convinces Maha to be happy with her.

== Cast ==
=== Main ===
==== Season 1 (2018-2020) ====
- Senthil Kumar as:
  - Mayan - Devi's husband and Aravind's twin brother
  - Dr. Aravind - Thamarai's husband, Devi's former fiancé and Mayan's twin brother
- Raksha Holla as Devi
- Rashmi Jayraj as Thamarai Aravind

==== Season 2 (2020-2022) ====
- Senthil Kumar as:
  - Mayan – Rajarathnam and Saradha's elder son, Nachiyar's elder stepson, Maran's twin brother and Maha's husband
  - Maran – Rajarathnam and Saradha's younger son, Nachiyar's younger stepson and Mayan's twin brother
- Rachitha Mahalakshmi (2020 – November 2021) as Mahalakshmi Mayan ("Maha") – Mayan's wife and cousin, a teacher
  - Monisha Arshak (November 2021 – June 2022) as Maha (Replacement of Mahalakshmi)
- Bavithra (2022) as Thamarai Maran – Maran's wife

=== Supporting ===
==== Season 1 ====
- Sabitha Anand as Gowri Viswanathan – Aravind's foster mother
- Azhagu as Rathinavel – Mayan, Aravind, Malar, Sakthi and Anandhi's father
- Padmini as Selvi Rathinavel – Mayan, Aravind, Malar, Sakthi and Anandhi's mother
- Raviraj as Viswanathan – Aravind's foster father, and Rathinavel's best friend
- Madhu Mohan as Sandanapandi – Devi, Thamarai, Karthick and Vidhya's father
- Deepa Nethran as Valli Sandanapandi – Devi, Karthick and Vidhya's mother and Sandanapandi's first wife
- Premi Venkat as Parvathi Sandanapandi – Thamarai's mother and Sandanapandi's second wife
- Sasindhar Pushpalingam as Karthick – Sandanapandi and Valli's son, Devi's younger brother and Anandhi's husband
- Vanitha Hariharan as Anandhi Karthick – Rathinavel's younger daughter, Mayan's younger sister and Karthick's wife
- Ashritha Sreedas as Vidhya Sandanapandi – Sandanapandi and Valli's younger daughter, Devi's younger sister and Sakthi's love interest
- Kalpana Sri as Malar – Rathinavel's elder daughter and Mayan's elder sister
- Madhan as Sakthivel – Rathinavel's younger son and Mayan's younger brother
- RJ Shivakanth as Right – Mayan's best friend
- Parthiban as Lingam – Valli's brother and Devi, Karthick and Vidhya's uncle
- Rekha Nair as Thenu Lingam – Lingam's wife and Devi, Karthick and Vidhya's aunt
- Deepa Shree as Swarnam – Gowri's sister's daughter and Aravind's foster cousin
- Maanas Chavali as Thirukumaran a.k.a. Red Kumar – Thamarai's former fiancé
- T. V. V. Ramanujam as Devi, Thamarai, Karthick and Vidhya's grandfather

==== Season 2 ====
- Sabitha Anand as Nachiyar Rajarathnam – Rajarathnam's second wife, Mayan and Maaran’s stepmother, Gayathri, Sharanya and Aishwarya's mother, Maha's and Thamarai's stepmother-in-law, Kathiresan, Pandi and Karthik's mother-in-law
- Gayathri Yuvraaj as Gayathri Kathiresan – Kathiresan's wife, Rajarathnam and Nachiyar's eldest daughter, Mayan and Maran's half-sister and Maha and Thamarai's half-sister-in-law; previously engaged to Muthuraj and Aadhavan
- Janani Ashok Kumar as Sharanya Pandi – Pandi's wife, Rajarathnam and Nachiyar's second daughter, Mayan and Maran's half-sister and Maha and Thamarai's half-sister-in-law
- Vaishnavi Arulmozhi as Aishwarya karthik – karthik wife, Muthurasu's ex-wife, Rajarathnam and Nachiyar's youngest daughter, Mayan and Maran's half-sister and Maha and Thamarai's half-sister-in-law
- Prabhakaran Chandran as Rathnavel – Maha and Kasthuri's father, Parvathy's husband, Sharadha's elder brother, Mayan and Maran's maternal uncle and Mayan's father-in-law
- Deepa Nethran as Parvathy Rathnavel – Maha and Kasthuri's mother, Rathnavel's wife, Mayan and Maran's maternal aunt and Mayan's mother-in-law
- Premi Venkat as Sharadha – Rajarathnam's ex-wife, Mayan and Maran's mother, Rathnavel's sister and Maha's and Thamarai's mother-in-law
- Raju Jeyamohan as Kathiresan (a.k.a. Kathi) – Mayan's best friend and Gayathri's husband
- Sasindhar Pushpalingam as DSP Karthik IPS – Aishwarya's husband
- Praveen Devasagayam as Pandi 2 – Sharanya's husband, Thamarai's brother
- Ashritha Sreedas as Kasthuri Rathnavel – Maha's younger sister and Rathnavel's younger daughter
- David Solomon Raja as Chidambaram – Nachiyar's brother, Gayathri, Sharanya and Aishwarya's uncle and Muthuraj's father
- Deepa Shree as Vadivukkarasi (vadivu) Chidambaram – Chidambaram's wife, Gayathri, Sharanya and Aishwarya's aunt and Muthuraj's mother
- Parthiban as Maasaani – Vadivu's brother, Muthuraj's uncle and Pandi's father
- Sathya Raaja as Muthuraj Chidhambaram – Aishwarya's ex-husband, Vadivu and Chidhambaram's son and Gayathri's former fiancé
- Singapore Deepan as Murugesh – Mayan's friend
- Karthik as Pandi 1 – Maasaani's son
- R. Aravindraj as Vishwanathan – Rajarathnam's friend
- Sivan Srinivasan as Rajarathnam – Mayan, Maran, Gayathri, Sharanya and Aishwarya's father, Saradha's ex-husband and Nachiyar's husband
- Navin Vetri as Surya – Maha's former fiancé
- R. J. Sivakanth as Dancing Drouser (a.k.a. DD) – Maran's friend and manager

== Development ==
=== Casting ===
==== Season 1: (2018-2020) ====
The season featured Senthil Kumar in his first dual role as Mayan and Aravind. Raksha Holla starred as Devi.

==== Season 2: (2020–2022) ====
Because of the suspension of shooting due to the COVID-19 outbreak, season one ended on 27 March 2020. The series resumed as season 2 on 27 July 2020, four months later, with a different storyline and cast.
