= Venkat Renganathan =

Indian actor

Venkatesh Ranganathan
- Born: 12 May 1986 (age 39); Palani, Tamil Nadu, India
- Occupation: Actor
- Years active: 2006–present
- Spouse: Ajantha
- Children: Tejaswini

Venkat Renganathan (born 12 May 1986) is an Indian Tamil actor who works in Tamil television. He is known for portraying Jeeva in Pandian Stores. Venkat Renganathan is married and has a daughter.

== Television ==
Year	Serial/Program	Role	Channel
2007	Kana Kaanum Kaalangal		Vijay TV
2012	Aan Paavam		Sun TV
2012–2013	Maya		Jaya TV
2013–2014	Puguntha Veedu		Zee Tamil
2013–2017	Deivam Thandha Veedu	Ravikumar	Vijay TV
2013–2014	Agni Paravai		Puthuyugam TV
2016–2017	Mella Thirandhathu Kadhavu	Santhosh	Zee Tamil
2017–2018	Ninaika Therintha Manamae	Ravi	Star Vijay
2018	Jodi Number One Season 10	Contestant	Star Vijay
2018–2023	Pandian Stores	Jeeva	Star Vijay
2018–2021	Roja	Ashwin	Sun TV
2020	Bharathi Kannamma	Jeeva (Special appearances)	Star Vijay
2021–2022	Baakiyalakshmi	Jeeva (Special appearances)	Star Vijay
2021	Thamizhum Saraswathiyum	Jeeva (Special appearances)	Star Vijay
2022	Raju Vootla Party	Guest	Star Vijay
2022	Super Daddy	Contestant	Star Vijay
2023–2024	Kizhakku Vaasal	Shanmugam and Shiva Shanmugam (Dual Role)	Star Vijay
2024–present	Pandian Stores 2	Senthilnathan Pandian	Star Vijay
2025	Poongatru Thirumbuma	Himself (Guest appearance)	Star Vijay

== Filmography ==
- Note: all films are in Tamil, unless otherwise noted.

Year	Title	Role	Notes
2017	Kuttram 23		
2018	Sei		
2019	Thirumanam	Venkat	
2024	Thiru.Manickam	Himself	Cameo appearance

== Awards ==
Year	Award	Category	Series	Result	Notes
2021	6th Annual Vijay Television Awards	Best Supporting actor	Pandian Stores	Won	
2023	8th Annual Vijay Television Awards	Best Hero	Pandian Stores	Won	
