= Mr & Mrs Khiladis =

- Genre: Stunt/dare game show
- Based on: Fear Factor
- Directed by: Kaushik Ravi
- Presented by: Deepak Dinkar
- Country of origin: India
- Original language: Tamil
- No. of seasons: 2
- No. of episodes: 60+

Production
- Camera setup: Multi-camera
- Running time: approx. 40-45 minutes per episode

Original release
- Network: Zee Tamil
- Release: 28 May – 28 August 2016

Related
- Fear Factor

Mr & Mrs Khiladis is an Indian Tamil-language celebrity stunt based reality television series based on the American series Fear Factor. The show first season was premiered on 17 September 2016 on Zee Tamil and also available to watch on digital platform ZEE5. The show was being host by Deepak Dinkar for all the seasons.

== Seasons overview ==
Season	Episodes	Original Broadcast		Time	Winner
Season	Episodes	First Aired	Last Aired	Time	Winner
1	28	28 May 2016	28 August 2016	Saturday to Sunday; 20:00 (IST)	Yuvaraj & Gayathri Yuvraaj
2		23 June 2018	16 September 2018	Saturday to Sunday; 20:00 (IST)	Siddharth & Priyadarshini

== Season 1 ==
The first season of the show began airing on 28 May 2016, and ended on 28 August 2016, after airing 28 episodes. The show was hosted by Deepak Dinkar.

- Title Winners of Mr & Mrs Khiladis 1 : Yuvaraj & Gayathri Yuvraaj

=== Contestants ===
- Rachitha Mahalakshmi and Dinesh Gopalsamy
- Myna Nandhini and Karthik Ravichandran (Karthikeyan)
- Yuvaraj and Gayathri Yuvraaj
- Badava Gopi and Haritha
- Mani and Chrylsheelaa
- Anu and Vignesh
- Minnal Deepa and Ramesh
- Nethran and Deepa
- Adhivith and Archana
- Sarath and Swapna

== Season 2 ==
The second season aired on every Saturday and Sunday at 21:30 from 23 June 2018 to 16 September 2018. Deepak Dinkar was again appointed as the host. The season title winner is Siddharth and his wife Priyadarshini.

- Title Winners of Mr & Mrs Khiladis 2 : Siddharth & Priyadarshini

- Siddharth and Priyadarshini
- Ishvar and Jayashree
- Subbulakshmi and Kamalesh
- Dhanalakshmi and Shiva
- Raghav and Preetha
- Karthik and Rathi
- Anandhi and Aja
- Jenifer and Kasivishwanathan
- Singapore Deepan and Sukanya
