= Ranganayaka =

2024 Kannada film by Guruprasad

- Theatrical release poster
- Directed by: Guruprasad
- Written by: Guruprasad
- Produced by: A R Vikyath
- Starring: Jaggesh; Guruprasad; Rachitha Mahalakshmi; Chaitra Kootur; Yogaraj Bhat; Chandra Mohan Jayaramaiah
- Cinematography: Samrat Asok Gautham
- Edited by: Umesh R B
- Music by: Anoop Seelin
- Production company: Vikyath Chithra
- Release date: 8 March 2024
- Running time: 121 minutes
- Country: India
- Language: Kannada

Ranganayaka is a 2024 Indian Kannada language political satire film directed by Guruprasad. The film stars himself, Jaggesh and Rachitha Mahalakshmi in lead roles. The film revolves around a filmmaker who learns about his past life in which he attempted to make the first ever Kannada film.

Ranganayaka was released on 8 March 2024. The film opened with highly negative reviews from critics as well as audience, and became a box office bomb.

== Cast ==
- Jaggesh as Ranganayaka
- Guruprasad as Guruprasad
- Rachitha Mahalakshmi
- Yogaraj Bhat
- Chaitra Kotoor
- Chandra Mohan Jayaramaiah
- Vageesh R Katti

== Soundtrack ==
The film has two songs composed by J Anoop Seelin. They were sung by Sharadasuta, J Anoop Seelin, Muniraju & Indu Nagaraj.

All music is composed by J Anoop Seelin.

No.	Title	Singers	Length
1.	"Enna Manadarasi"	J. Anoop Seelin, Indu Nagaraj	3:13
2.	"Gaali Tangaali Kannada Mathade"	J. Anoop Seelin, Muniraju	3:59

== Release ==
The film was released on 8 March 2024.

== Reception ==
=== Critical response ===
Sridevi S of Times of India gave 2.5/5 stars and wrote "Overall, this is a huge disappointment coming from the pair that gave Matha and Eddelu Manjunatha, both cult classics in their own right." A.Sharadhaa of The New Indian Express rated 2.5/5 stars and wrote "While Ranganayaka may not soar as high as its predecessors, it still delivers enough entertainment for viewers to relish, albeit tinged with a hint of disappointment. " Shashiprasad S.M. of Times Now gave 2.5/5 stars and wrote "Ranganayaka is disappointing when one compares it to the impressive Mata and Eddelu Manjunatha but it is still good enough for audiences to enjoy." M.V Vivek of The Hindu wrote "'Ranganayaka', a comedy drama, attempts to pay tribute to Kannada cinema, but there is no meat in the story and the treatment feels too familiar."

The film was also reviewed by Udayavani, Vijay Karnataka, Kannada Prabha, and Hindustan Times.
