= Gayathri Yuvraaj =

Indian television actress (born 1988)

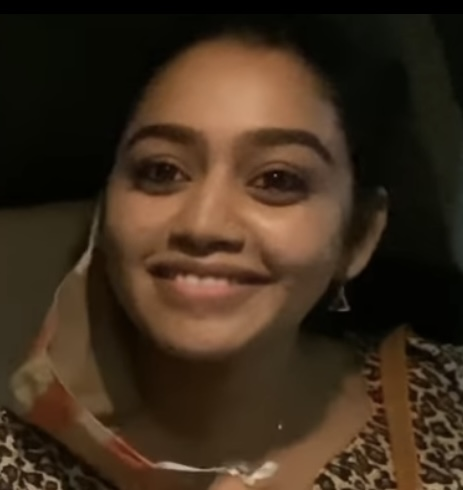
- Gayathri in 2022
- Born: Gayathri; 11 November 1988 (age 37); Chennai, Tamil Nadu, India
- Other name: Gayatri Yuvraj
- Occupation: Actress
- Years active: 2009 – present
- Known for: Thendral; Saravanan Meenatchi (season 3); Aranmanai Kili; Chithi 2
- Spouse: Yuvraaj
- Children: 2

Gayathri Yuvraaj (born 11 November 1988) is an Indian television actress who works in Tamil television industry. She made her acting debut in the Tamil television serial Thendral which aired on Sun TV.

== Personal life ==
Gayathri was born on 11 November 1988 and was brought up in Chennai, Tamil Nadu. She was educated in Chennai and completed a college degree in Chennai. She married Yuvaraj and had a son.

In July 2023, Gayathri announced her second pregnancy on social media via through Instagram. On 16 November 2023, Gayathri gave birth to a baby girl named Yuga.

== Career ==
Gayathri made her first television appearance in the dance show Mr & Mrs Khiladis where she emerged as the winner and later appeared on Jodi Number One which aired on Star Vijay. She made her acting debut in the Tamil television serial Thendral, along with Deepak Dinkar and Shruthi Raj, directed by S Kumaran.

She has appeared in well-known television serials including Priyasaki, Azhagi, Mella Thirandhathu Kadhavu, Mohini, Kalathu Veedu and Aranmanai Kili.

== Filmography ==
=== Television ===
Year	Serial	Role	Notes
2009	Thendral	Nila	
2011	Azhagi	Ambalika	
2013	Ponnunjal	Ramyapriya	
2014	Mohini	Archana	
2015	Kalathu Veedu	Pusphavali	
2015	Priyasaki	Abhi	
2015	Mella Thirandhathu Kadhavu	Selvi	
2016	Saravanan Meenatchi (season 3)	Muthazhagu	
2016	Mr & Mrs Khiladis	Contestant	Winner
2018	Aranmanai Kili	Renuka	
2020	Chithi 2	Ganga	
2020	Naam Iruvar Namakku Iruvar	Gayathri Kathiresan	
2021	Mr. and Mrs. Chinnathirai 3	Contestant	3rd finalist
2023	Meenakshi Ponnunga	Yamuna	
2023	Tamizha Tamizha	Guest	Reality show
2023	Magarasi	Ragini	

== See also ==
- List of Indian television actresses
