= Mohini (TV series) =

- மோகினி
- Genre: Soap opera
- Written by: S. Sekkizhar
- Screenplay by: S. Sekkizhar
- Directed by: Raama Krishnan
- Starring: Sivaranjani; Raja; Ferozkhan
- Theme music composer: Ramani Bharadwaj
- Opening theme: "Mohini Mohini"; S. P. Balasubrahmanyam (Vocal); Vairamuthu (Lyrics)
- Country of origin: India
- Original language: Tamil
- No. of seasons: 1
- No. of episodes: 276

Production
- Producer: AVM Productions
- Camera setup: Multi-camera
- Running time: approx. 20-22 minutes per episode
- Production company: AVM Productions

Original release
- Network: Kalaignar TV
- Release: 22 September 2014 – 30 October 2015

Mohini (Tamil: மோகினி) is a 2014 Indian Tamil-language soap opera that aired on Kalaignar TV from 22 September 2014 to 30 October 2015 on Monday through Thursday at 19:30 (IST) and later extended up to Friday and A new show named Ramanujar replaced this show at 19:30 (IST) and pushed this serial to 20:00 (IST) instead since 1 June 2015. The show last aired on 30 October 2015 and ended with 276 episodes.

The show starring by Sivaranjani, Raja and Ferozkhan. The show is produced by AVM Productions, Story Screenplay and Dialogue by S.Sekkizhar and directed by Raama Krishnan. The show replace Vairakiyam and Bhavani.

== Plot ==
The storyline of "Mohini" (Sivaranjani) named after the protagonist Mohini will revolve around the loving and caring girl who ditches her love for the sake of her parents and marries the guy the friend of her ex-boyfriend (Ferozkhan). The twist starts from the first night of their life.

== Cast ==
=== Main ===
- Sivaranjani as Mohini/(deceased Jagan) Gautham's Wife and Jagan EX-Girlfriend
- Raja as gautham (Mohini`s Husband)
- Ferozkhan as Jagan (Mohini`s EX-Boyfriend) (Dead)

=== Supporting ===
- Gayathri Yuvraaj as Archana
- Ashwanth Thilak
- Poorni as Geetha
- Flim Shiva
- Sripriya
- Sanjeykumar
- Sujatha
- Sarath
- Yamunaa
- Egavalli
- Divya

== Title song ==
It was written by lyricist Vairamuthu, composed Ramani Bharadwaj sung by S. P. Balasubrahmanyam.

=== Soundtrack ===
Track list
No.	Title	Lyrics	Music	Singer(s)	Length
1.	"Mohini (மோகினி) Title Song"	Vairamuthu	Ramani Bharadwaj	S. P. Balasubrahmanyam	3:00

== Awards ==
Year	Award	Category	Recipient	Result
2015	The 46 Mylapore Academy Awards	Best Actress	Sivaranjani	Won
2015	The 46 Mylapore Academy Awards	Best Actor	Raja	Won
2015	The 46 Mylapore Academy Awards	Best Music Director	Ramani Bharadwaj	Won
