= Poornitha =

Indian actress

Kalyani
- Born: Poonitha Jayam; Kollam, Kerala, India
- Other name: Poornitha Jayam
- Occupations: Actress and TV Anchor
- Years active: 2001–present
- Spouse: Rohit

Kalyani, previously known as Poornitha, is an Indian film and television actress. She has acted in more than 300 advertisements as a child artist.

== Life ==
Kalyani married a doctor, Rohit based in Bangalore on 12 December 2013.

== Filmography ==
Year	Film	Role	Language	Notes
2001	Alli Thandha Vaanam	Julie	Tamil	
2002	Shree	Meenakshi's friend	Tamil	Cameo appearance
2002	Guruvamma	Guruvamma's sister	Tamil	
2003	Ramanaa	Ramanaa's adopted daughter	Tamil	
2003	Jayam	Kalyani	Tamil	
2003	Mullavalliyum Thenmavum	Thenmozhi	Malayalam	
2004	Quotation	Lakshmi	Malayalam	
2006	Maranthen Meimaranthen	Renuka	Tamil	
2006	Prathi Gnayiru 9 Manimudhal 10.30 Varai	Kalyani	Tamil	
2007	Manchu Kurise Velalo	-	Telugu	
2008	Inba	Jyothi	Tamil	
2008	Kathi Kappal	Mallika	Tamil	
2008	SMS	Kalyani	Malayalam	
2008	Parunthu	Bhuvana	Malayalam	
2009	Malli Malli	Madhu Satyanarayana	Telugu	
2009	Ilampuyal	Thendral Bose	Tamil	

== Television ==
Year	Title	Role	Source
2001	Charulatha		Child Artist
2003-2004	Annamalai	Surya	Child Artist
2004	Roja	Aishwarya	Child Artist
2003	Chinna Papa Periya Papa	Small Chinna Papa	Child Artist
2010	Super Mom	Host	
2011–2012	Pirivom Santhippom: Season 1	Revathi	Main Lead
2012–2013	Beach girls: Season 1	Host	
2013	Pirivom Santhippom: Season 2	Revathi	Main Lead
2013–2014	Thayumanavan	Janani Mathiazhagan	Main Lead
2014	Beach Girls	Host	
2014 – 2016	Andal Azhagar	Aandal	Main Lead
2017	Junior Senior	Host	
2017	Ganga	Malar	Main Lead
