= Nanjil Nalini =

Indian actress from Tamil Nadu (1944–2020)

- Born: Thuckalay, Kanyakumari District, Tamilnadu
- Occupation: Actor

Nanjil Nalini (1944–2020) was an Indian actress who mainly appeared in Tamil films and TV serials (soap-operas), in a career spanning over 50 years. She started as a child artist in theatre at age 12 and later went on act in over 100 films. She was honoured with the Kalaimamani award in 1978.

Nalini died in Chennai on 19 January 2020, aged 76.

== Background ==
Nanjil Nalini was born in Thuckalay in Kanyakumari District. An early inclination to acting led her to Tirunelveli town, where she joined a theatre troupe, at the age of 12. Her very first role at this age was that of a mother, in a play called ‘Nalvar’. She later went on act in drama troupes of legendary Tamil theatre artistes like T. K. Shanmugam (TKS), S. S. Rajendran, Major Sundarrajan and ‘Vairam Nataka Sabha’.

== Film and TV ==
Nanjil Nalini's talents and experience in theatre led to Tamil Cinema in Chennai, where she was given a small role in the 1968 Sivaji Ganesan starrer, Enga Oor Raja . She also acted in Sivaji Ganesan starrer films like Thanga Pathakkam (1974), Annan Oru Koyil (1977) and Theerpu (1982). Nalini acted in some well-known Tamil films of the 1970's, 80's and 90's in films of some major actors of the time – with Kamal Haasan in Aadu Puli Attam (1977), Rajinikanth in Dharma Yuddham (1979) and Sathyaraj in Rickshaw Mama (1992).

She was honoured with a kalaimamani award in 1978 for her contribution in the field of arts. She also received other popular Tamil film awards like AVM award, Aringar Anna, Kalaignar and Selvi Jayalalithaa awards.

In later years, she acted in some popular Tamil TV serials (soap-operas) like Azhagi, Valli, Mandhira Vaasal, Soolam, Krishnadasi, Achcham Madam Naanam and Brindhavanam.

== Later life ==
Nalini resided at Velachery, Chennai. Even during her film career, Nalini started and ran her own theatre troupe called ‘Revathy Fine Arts’. Nanjil Revathy, Nalini's daughter was part of the troupe. Nanjil Nalini died in Chennai on 19 January 2020, after a brief illness. She was 76.
