= Thayumanavan (TV series) =

- Genre: Drama
- Directed by: Francis Kathiravan
- Starring: Mathialagan; Maheshwari Chanakyan; Kalyani; Madhumila; Nancy Jennifer; Sujithra; Anwar; Kamal; Kuyili; Rajasekar
- Theme music composer: Vishal Chandrasekhar
- Opening theme: "Puyal Ondru"
- Composer: Ilayavan
- Country of origin: India
- Original language: Tamil
- No. of seasons: 1
- No. of episodes: 288

Production
- Camera setup: Multi-camera
- Running time: approx. 20-22 minutes per episode

Original release
- Network: STAR Vijay
- Release: 15 July 2013 – 5 September 2014

Thayumanavan is a 2013 Indian Tamil-language soap opera that aired on Vijay TV from 15 July 2013 through 5 September 2014 on Monday through Friday 7:30PM (IST). The show stars Mathialagan, Maheshwari Chanakyan, Kalyani, Kamal, Madhumila, Jeniffer and Sujithra. The show is directed by Francis Kathiravan.

The story of a single father (Mathialagan) and his five doting daughters (Maheswari, Kalyani, Madhumila, Nancy Jennifer and Sujithra). The story line revolves around the father-daughter relationship. The different lifestyles of the daughters and the way the father grows up along with his daughters to fulfill the gap of the mother.

== Plot ==
Maha's marriage is stopped as the groom runs off on the day of engagement. To manage the situation, Bharathi, who is Mathi's sister's son, marries Maha. Soon after the marriage, Mathiazhagan learns about Bharathi's love with Janani and he expels him from the family. Maha becomes upset and starts going to work. The father then solves the differences with his daughters and gets them a good life.

== Cast ==
=== Main ===
- Mathialagan M as Mathiazagan: A single father and businessman. After the death of his wife, he lives only for his five children.
- Maheshwari Chanakyan as Mahalakshmi: The first daughter of Mathiazagan and Barathi's wife. She respects her father.
- Kalyani as Janani: The third daughter of Mathiazagan and Barathi ex-girlfriend. A strong woman.
- Kamal Hassan as Bharathi: Mathiazagan's sister's son, Maha's husband and Janani's ex-lover
- Madhumila as Subha: The second daughter of Mathiazagan and Ashok's wife
- Nancy Jennifer as Indra: The fourth daughter of Mathiazagan and a college student
- Sucithra as Suchithra: The fifth daughter of Mathiazagan and school girl. She does not know her mother's face, she lives with her grandparents.

=== Additional cast ===
- Shreekumar as a Police Inspector; the love interest and eventually husband of Janani.
- Manoj/Syed Anwar Ahmed as Ashok: The second son-in-law of Mathiazagan; Suba's husband.
- Kavin as Vicky
- Rajasekar
- Kuyili
- Raghavan Durairaj
- K. Natraj as Mathi's uncle
- Anbazhagan (Anbu)
- Peeli Sivam
- Raghavendran
- Azhagappan
- Karthik Sasidharan as Guna

== Awards and nominations ==
Year	Award	Category	Recipient	Role	Result
2014	Vijay Television Awards	Favourite Actor Male	Kamalahasan	Bharathi	Nominated
2014	Vijay Television Awards	Favourite Supporting Actor Male	Mathialagan	Mathiyazhagan	Nominated
2014	Vijay Television Awards	Favourite International Find	Mathialagan	Mathiyazhagan	Nominated
