= Rachitha Mahalakshmi =

Indian actress

- Born: 24 April 1990 (age 36); Bangalore, Karnataka, India
- Occupations: Actress - Founder & CEO of RM Creations (Movie Production Company)
- Years active: 2007–present

Rachitha Mahalakshmi is an Indian actress who predominantly works in Tamil along with some Telugu and Kannada television and films. She is best known for her role as Jyoti in Pirivom Sandhippom, but gained critical acclaim as Meenatchi in the popular Tamil series Saravanan Meenatchi. She was also a contestant on the reality show Bigg Boss Tamil – Season 6 and was later evicted from the show on day 91.

== Early life and career ==
Rachitha was born in Bangalore. her mother tongue is Kannada, but she is also fluent in Tamil ,Telugu, and English. Rachitha made her debut in Mega Mandala, which was telecasted in Star Suvarna. Rachitha became popular and successful after playing the lead role of Meenatchi, in Saravanan Meenatchi, which was aired in Star Vijay. Since then, she is also recognized as Meenatchi.

== Television ==
Year	Title	Role	Channel	Language	Notes
2007-2009	Megha Mandala		Asianet Kannada	Kannada	Television Debut
2010	Suryakanthi		Zee Kannada	Kannada	
2011-2012	Pirivom Santhippom	Jyothi	Vijay TV	Tamil	
2013-2014	Ilavarasi	Maha Lakshmi IPS (Maha)	Sun TV	Tamil	
2013	Masala Kudumbam	Anjali	Zee Tamil	Tamil	
2013	Avakashikal	Ganga	Surya TV	Malayalam	
2013-2016	Saravanan Meenatchi season 2	Thanga Meenatchi	Vijay TV	Tamil	
2013-2015	Swathi Chinukulu	Neela	ETV Telugu	Telugu	
2016	Mr & Mrs Khiladis Season 1	Herself / Contestant	Zee Tamil	Tamil	With Dinesh Gopalsamy
2016—2018	Saravanan Meenatchi season 3	Meenakshi & Vedha Valli	Star Vijay	Tamil	
2016—2017	Geethanjali	Priya	Star Suvarna	Kannada	
2017	Junior Senior	Judge	Zee Tamil	Tamil	
2019	Junior Super Star (Season 3)	Judge	Zee Tamil	Tamil	
2019-2020	Nachiyarpuram	Jyothi	Zee Tamil	Tamil	
2020	Zee Tamil House Party	Herself	Zee Tamil	Tamil	Lockdown Programme Through Virtual Meet
2020	Chitti Talli	Shakuntala	Star Maa	Telugu	
2020-2021	Naam Iruvar Namakku Iruvar Season 2	Maha Lakshmi Mayan (Maha)	Star Vijay	Tamil	
2021	Start Music Season 2	Herself / Participant	Star Vijay	Tamil	Naam Iruvar Namakku Iruvar Special
2021—2022	Amman seasons 1 & 2	Amman	Colors Tamil	Tamil	Episodic Appearance
2021	Sembaruthi	Goddess Bhuvaneshvari	Zee Tamil	Tamil	Special Appearance
2022	Idhu Solla Marandha Kadhai	Sadhana	Colors Tamil	Tamil	
2022	Pudhu Pudhu Arthangal	Adv. Jansi Rani	Zee Tamil	Tamil	Special Appearance
2022	Sathya Season 2	Herself	Zee Tamil	Tamil	Climax episode
2022-2023	Bigg Boss Tamil – Season 6	Contestant	Star Vijay	Tamil	Evicted Day 91
2023	Bigg Boss Kondattam	Herself	Star Vijay	Tamil	
2023	Oo Solriya Oo Oohm Solriya	Herself & Participant	Star Vijay	Tamil	Final Episode
2023	Tamizha Tamizha Season 3	Herself	Zee Tamil	Tamil	Guest appearance
2024	Bombaatbhojana Season 4	Herself	Star Suvarna	Kannada	Guest appearance
2026—Present	Seetharamayya Gari Manavaralu	Vasudha	ETV	Telugu	

== Filmography ==
=== Films ===
Year	Title	Role	Language	Notes
2010	Gani	Shreya	Kannada	
2012	Parijatha	Nandhini	Kannada	
2015	Uppu Karuvadu	Uma	Tamil	
2024	Ranganayaka	Varalakshmi	Kannada	
2025	Xtreme	R. Shruthi	Tamil	
2025	Thalli Manasu	Jyothi	Telugu	
2025	Fire	Meenakshi	Tamil	
2025	Eddelu Manjunatha 2		Kannada	
2026	99/66	Sangeetha	Tamil	
TBA	Mei Nigare	TBA	Tamil	
TBA	U R Next	TBA	Tamil	

=== Web series ===
Year	Title	Role	Language	Network	Notes	Ref.
2023	Love You Abhi	Prema	Kannada	JioCinema	Special Appearance	
