= Pirivom Santhippom (TV series) =

- Genre: Soap opera
- Directed by: Rasool
- Starring: Kalyani; Rachitha Mahalakshmi; Syed Anwar Ahmed; Dinesh Gopalasamy; Anuradha Krishnamoorthy; Rajyalakshmi
- Country of origin: India
- Original language: Tamil
- No. of seasons: 2
- No. of episodes: 272

Production
- Producer: Syed Anwar Ahmed
- Editor: PM Achuthan
- Camera setup: Multi-camera
- Running time: approx. 20-22 minutes per episode
- Production company: Ever Green Productions

Original release
- Network: STAR Vijay
- Release: 4 April 2011 – 4 May 2012

Pirivom Santhippom is a 2011 Indian Tamil-language soap opera that aired Monday through Friday on Vijay TV from 4 April 2011 to 4 May 2012 at 7:30PM (IST) for 272 episodes. Its initial concept is an adaptation from North Indian Hindi serial Sapna Babul Ka...Bidaai that aired on Star Plus.

The show starred Kalyani, Rachitha Mahalakshmi, Syed Anwar Ahmed, Dinesh Gopalasamy, Anuradha Krishnamoorthy and among others. It was directed by Rasool. This is a story of two childhood friends Revathy (Kalyani) and Jyothi (Rachitha Mahalakshmi) explores the social impacts of skin colour.

== Plot ==
Revathy (Kalyani) who is treated as a step-daughter in the family by her aunt Dhanam (Rajyalakshmi), Jothi's mother and is targeted because of her beauty. Jothi (Rachitha Mahalakshmi) gets criticised of her dark complexion and her marriage gets delayed because of her appearance. Amidst all the differences and partialities, Revathy and Jothi stay close to each other. The beautiful friendship breaks due to multiple factors when Revathy marries Prabhu (Syed Anwar Ahmed), a psychologically affected guy for the sake of her family. Unfortunate events happen and finally Jyothi's marriage with Karthik (Dinesh Gopalsamy), death of Shanmugaraja and Revathy accused of his death. Revathy endures the evil plans of Abirami (Anuradha Krishnamoorthy) and brings Prabhu back to normal life by her persistent effort and belief in him.

== Cast ==
=== Main cast ===
- Poornitha as Revathy
  - is the daughter of Shanmugaraja's sister who has lost her parents at young age and is raised by him. She is a very pretty girl and is loved by Shanmugaraja like his own daughter
- Rachitha Mahalakshmi as Jyothi
  - is their beloved daughter who is a very active and fun loving girl, but she is often commented upon because of her dark complexion
- Syed Anwar Ahmed as Prabhu
- Dinesh Gopalsamy as Karthik

=== Additional cast ===
- Anuradha Krishnamoorthy as Abirami
- Rajyalakshmi as Dhanam
- Udhai as Arunachalam
- Vanthana
- Sridevi Ashok
- Ravi
- L. Raja as Shanmugaraja

== Awards and nominations ==
Year	Award	Category	Recipient	Role	Result
2014	Vijay Television Awards	Favourite Actor Female	Kalyani	Revathy	Nominated
2014	Vijay Television Awards	Favourite Actor Male	Syed Anwar Ahmed	Prabhu	Won

== Adaptations ==
Language	Title	Original Release	Network(s)	Last aired	Notes
Hindi	Sapna Babul Ka... Bidaai सपना बाबुल का... बिदाई	8 October 2007	StarPlus	13 November 2010	Original
Tamil	Pirivom Santhippom பிரிவோம் சந்திப்போம்	4 April 2011	Star Vijay	4 May 2012	Remake
Marathi	Pathrakhin पाठराखीण	1 June 2026	Star Pravah	Ongoing	Remake
