= Bigg Boss (Tamil TV series) season 8 =

Indian reality show season

Bigg Boss
- Season 8
- Season 8 eye logo
- Presented by: Vijay Sethupathi
- No. of days: 105
- No. of housemates: 24
- Winner: Muthukumaran Jegatheesan
- Runner-up: Soundariya Nanjundan
- No. of episodes: 106

Release
- Original network: Star Vijay; Disney+ Hotstar
- Original release: 6 October 2024 – 19 January 2025

Season chronology
- ← Previous; Season 7 Next → Season 9

Bigg Boss 8 is the eighth season of the Indian Tamil-language version reality television series Bigg Boss. It premiered on 6 October 2024 on Star Vijay and Disney+ Hotstar. Vijay Sethupathi joined as the host for the season marking his first time.

The grand finale of the season took place on 19 January 2025, where Muthukumaran Jegatheesan emerged as the winner, while Soundariya Nanjundan was the runner-up and Vishal as 2nd runner up. Jacquline Lydia made history by continuously nominated for 15 Weeks.

== Production ==
=== Eye logo ===
The eye logo was officially released on 4 September 2024. The season's logo was shaped with two grey semi-circles and the numeral 8 in light blue featuring as the pupil of the eye.

=== House ===
The House of this season had a "'Boys vs Girls'" theme. The house was again located in EVP Film City, Chennai for the eighth time, including Bigg Boss Ultimate (season 1). The house is split with a line in the middle dividing the male and female contestants. The house has a forest and nature theme for the season. The house has six sections: living area, kitchen, dining and sitting area, bedrooms, garden, and a confession room. This season features two separate bedrooms for the first time since Bigg Boss 5. However, after the eighth week of the show, male and female housemates could sleep in whichever bedroom they wished.

=== Host ===
Over seven years, Bigg Boss Tamil aired seasons with Kamal Haasan as host. In August 2024, Kamal Haasan announced his exit from Bigg Boss Tamil, due to scheduling conflicts with his upcoming films.

Following his departure, Vijay Sethupathi took over as host for the eighth season.

=== Teasers ===
The first promo was released on 11 September 2024, with Sethupathi saying "This time, Aalum Puthusu, Aatamum Puthusu". (transl. "This time, the person is new, the game is new")

== Housemates status ==
S.no	Housemates	Day entered	Day exited	Housemates Status
1	Muthukumaran	Day 1	Day 105	Winner
2	Soundariya	Day 1	Day 105	1st runner-up
3	Vishal	Day 1	Day 105	2nd runner-up
4	Pavithra	Day 1	Day 105	3rd runner-up
5	Rayan	Day 28	Day 105	4th runner-up
6	Jacquline	Day 1	Day 102	Evicted by Task
7	Deepak	Day 1	Day 98	Evicted
8	Arun	Day 1	Day 97	Evicted
9	Manjari	Day 28	Day 91	Evicted
10	Raanav	Day 28	Day 90	Evicted
11	Anshitha	Day 1	Day 84	Evicted
12	Jeffry	Day 1	Day 83	Evicted
13	Ranjith	Day 1	Day 77	Evicted
14	Tharshika	Day 1	Day 70	Evicted
15	Sathya	Day 1	Day 69	Evicted
16	Sachana	Day 1		Evicted by Housemates
16	Sachana	Day 5	Day 63	Evicted
17	Ananthi	Day 1	Day 63	Evicted
18	Shiva	Day 28	Day 56	Evicted
19	Varshini	Day 28	Day 49	Evicted
20	Riya	Day 28	Day 42	Evicted
21	Sunita	Day 1	Day 35	Evicted
22	Dharsha	Day 1	Day 21	Evicted
23	Arnav	Day 1	Day 14	Evicted
24	Ravindar	Day 1	Day 7	Evicted

== Housemates ==
The list of housemates in the order of entering the house:

=== Original entrants ===
- Fatman (Ravindar Chandrasekaran), a film producer and actor, known for Munnarivaan, Nalanum Nandhiniyum.
- Sachana Namidass, an actress known for her role in Maharaja.
- Dharsha Gupta, a television and film actress known for her appearances in Mullum Malarum, Oh My Ghost and Cooku With Comali (Season 2).
- Sathya SK, a television actor known for his roles in Neelakuyil, Velaikkaran, Anna (TV series) and Panivizhum Malarvanam, husband of Season 2 contestant Ramya NSK.
- Deepak Dinkar, an actor and television presenter known for his roles in Thendral, Thirumathi Selvam and Thamizhum Saraswathiyum.
- RJ Ananthi, an actress and Radio Jockey known for her roles in Comali, Bigil, Netrikann and D Block.
- Sunita Gogoi, an actress, dancer and performer, known for her appearances in Jodi Number One Season 5 and Cooku With Comali.
- Jeffry, a gaana singer and performer.
- Ranjith, a film and television actor known for his roles in Pasupathi c/o Rasakkapalayam, Pandavar Bhoomi and Baakiyalakshmi.
- Pavithra Janani, a television actress known for her roles in Eeramana Rojave and Thendral Vandhu Ennai Thodum.
- Soundariya Nanjundan, an actress and model known for her roles in Thamizh Padam 2, Draupathi, Vera Maari Office and forth runner-up contestant in Villa to Village.
- Arun Prasath, a television actor known for his role in Bharathi Kannamma.
- Tharshika, a television actress known for her appearances in shows such as Thalattu, Ponni and the third runner-up of Jodi Are U Ready.
- VJ Vishal, a television actor known for his roles in Kalyanamam Kalyanam, Aranmanai Kili and Baakiyalakshmi.
- Anshitha Akbarsha, a television actress known for her roles in the TV serial Chellamma and Malayalam serials such as Kabani and Koodevide.
- Arnav Amjath, a television actor known for his roles in the TV serials Sakthi, Keladi Kanmani and Chellamma.
- Muthukumaran Jegatheesan, an social media influencer, and YouTuber, known for contestant in Tamil Pechu Engal Moochu (Season 3).
- Jacquline Lydia, an actress and television presenter known for her roles in Kolamaavu Kokila, Kalakka Povathu Yaaru? and Thaenmozhi B.A.

=== Wildcard entrants ===
- Nagapriya "Riya" Thiyagarajan, a Bigg Boss critic, influencer and model. She is also the second runner-up of the beauty pageant Miss Chennai 2023.
- Raanav V C - an actor and model, known for his role in the web series Aadhalinaal Kaadhal Seiveer.
- Varshini Venkat, an actress and model known for her role in Kannana Kanne.
- Manjari Narayanan, an influencer, public speaker and news reader, known for contestant in Tamil Pechu Engal Moochu (Season 3).
- Shiva Kumar, an actor known for his role in the film Singakutty and winning BB Jodigal (Season 2), husband of Season 1 contestant Suja Varunee.
- Rayan, a television actor known for his roles in Thamizhum Saraswathiyum and Panivizhum Malarvanam.

== Twists ==
=== 24-hour eviction ===
Host Vijay Sethupathi announced that for the first time in Bigg Boss history there will be an eviction within 24 hours of the grand launch. Sachana Namidass was evicted by fellow housemates in an open nomination process.

=== Boys vs girls ===
On launch day, Bigg Boss announced that the theme of the season is going to be boys vs. girls hence both boys and girls need to collaborate to obtain privileges over the Bigg Boss house facilities with the other gender. Both teams will record their points for each weekly and daily task they win. The team with the most points closer to the end of the season will receive special advantages. However the theme concluded on Day 50 and the individual competition began.

Scoreboard
Week(s)	Task	Men	Women
1	Weekly	0	2
1	Daily	—N/a	—N/a
2	Weekly	10 (5 + 5)	6 (3 + 3)
2	Daily	1	2
3	Weekly	—N/a	—N/a
3	Daily	1 (1 + 0 + 0)	2 (0 + 1 + 1)
4	Weekly	—N/a	—N/a
4	Daily	1 (1 + 0 + 0)	2 (0 + 1 + 1)
5	Weekly	—N/a	—N/a
5	Daily	2 (1 + 1)	0 (0 + 0)
6	Weekly	—N/a	—N/a
6	Daily	2 (0 + 1 + 1)	1 (1 + 0 + 0)
7	Weekly	3	1
7	Daily	2 (1 + 1)	0 (0 + 0)
Total Points		22	16
The Boys vs Girls theme concluded in Week 7 Winners : Boys

=== Contestant swap and direct nomination ===
A contestant from each team is interchanged every week to support their respective teams. The two contestants are allowed to directly nominate a contestant from the house for the upcoming eviction process directly. This ended in week 7.

Week(s)	From Team Boys to Team Girls	Directly nominated to next week	From Team Girls to Team Boys	Directly nominated to next week
1	Muthukumaran	Jacquline	Pavithra	Deepak
2	Deepak	Dharsha	Dharsha	Arun
3	Jeffry	Anshida	Sachana	Deepak
4	Vishal	Jacquline	Soundariya	Vishal
5	Raanav	Soundariya	Jacquline	Shiva
6	Rayan	Varshini	Anshida	Muthukumaran
7	Sathya	Jacquline	Ananthi	Ranjith

=== Weekly team nomination-free pass ===
Each week the teams will need to complete three rounds of tasks assigned by Bigg Boss and the team that wins the most tasks will receive a nomination free pass token which will allow them to save a housemate from their team who is in the present week's nomination list. This ended in week 7.

Week(s)	Team won	Saved from ongoing week's eviction
1	Team Boys	Arun
2	Team Girls	Jacquline
3	Team Girls	Pavithra
4	Team Girls	Sunita
5	Team Boys	Ranjith
6	Team Boys	Deepak
7	Team Boys	Shiva

=== Goibibo's all-expenses-paid trip to dream destination ===
Team Boys and Team Girls will need to entertain and perform well every week. At the end of every week, one best performer will be chosen from each team by their housemates, which in turn will reward them with a Goibibo stamp in their Goibibo passport. The Boys vs Girls theme concluded on Day 50. Following that, two or more individuals will be selected by their housemates as the best performers in the house based on their weekly performance. The contestant who collects the most stamps towards the end of the season will receive an all-expenses-paid trip to their dream destination.

Week(s)	Best performer (Boys vs Girls)	
Week(s)	Team Boys	Team Girls
2	Ranjith	Tharshika
3	Muthukumaran	Ananthi
4	Sathya	Ananthi
5	Arun	Soundariya
6	Vishal	Manjari
7	Deepak	Pavithra
Best performers (Individual)
8	Jeffry and Sachana	
9	Deepak, Manjari, Pavithra and Ranjith	
10	Jacquline, Muthukumaran and Vishal	
11	Jeffry, Muthukumaran and Pavithra	
Top 3 Best Performers (Weeks 2 - 9): Deepak, Manjari, Pavithra
Winner: Pavithra (Destination: Vietnam)

=== Nomination-Free Pass (Viduthalai Pass) ===
Every week, all housemates are required to compete and excel in the weekly task assigned by Bigg Boss. The winner will be awarded a Nomination-Free Pass, granting them immunity from the nomination process in the following week. However, this immunity was revoked by Bigg Boss for the rest of the season due to foul play observed during Week 12's captaincy task, conducted at the end of Week 11.

Housemate	Obtained during	Used during
Arun	Week 1	Week 2
Jeffry	Week 8	Week 9
Manjari	Week 9	Week 10
Jeffry	Week 10	Week 11
Rayan	Week 11	Week 12
Viduthalai Pass revoked from Week 12

=== A23's Captaincy Streak leaderboard ===
The A23 Captaincy Streak Leaderboard tracks the captaincy streaks of housemates weekly, with updates featuring their names and achievements. At the end of the season, the housemate with the highest number of captaincies will be awarded a Royal Enfield motorcycle by A23. Evicted housemates become ineligible for this reward. During Week 14, A23 organized a tiebreaker challenge for the remaining contestants on the A23 Captaincy Streak Leaderboard. The task featured Muthukumaran, Vishal, Deepak, and Arun as participants, as they were the only housemates still present in the house and on the leaderboard, while the others—Manjari, Jeffry, Ranjith, Tharshika, and Sathya—had been evicted. Muthukumaran secured victory by being the first to successfully complete the puzzle task.

Housemates	Captaincy Streak	Captaincy Weeks	Eviction
Muthukumaran	1	Week 4	Week 15
Vishal	1	Week 11	Week 15
Deepak	1	Week 8	Week 14
Arun	1	Week 6	Week 14
Manjari	1	Week 7	Week 13
Jeffry	1	Week 9	Week 12
Ranjith	1	Week 10	Week 11
Tharshika	2	Week 1 & 3	Week 10
Sathya	2	Week 2 & 5	Week 10
House Captaincy concluded in Week 11
Winner: Muthukumaran

=== Movies ===
This is the first season in Bigg Boss history where housemates watched a full-length movie on Netflix as a promotion for the movie and production team.

S.no	Movie
1	Amaran
2	Viduthalai Part 2

=== Wild Card Knock - Out (K.O.) ===
For the first time in Bigg Boss history, Penultimate Week witnessed the return of the first eight evicted contestants, not as reunion guests but as challengers. In the unprecedented Wild Card Knock-Out (K.O.) task, the Top 8 had to compete against the challengers to defend their positions and secure a spot in the final week. By the end of the task, one or two members of the Top 8 could be replaced by challengers based on performance, while those who fail will face eviction.

However, on Day 99, Bigg Boss concluded, after a discussion he initiated, that the challengers had not made sufficient efforts to replace the Top 6. Acknowledging the consistent performance of the Top 6, he declared that their efforts earned them a place in the finale week.

=== Cash Grab Run Task and Jacquline's eviction ===
Unlike other seasons (including BB Ultimate) where the housemate accepts the cash eviction and evicts them self from the game. This season for the first time in Bigg Boss India's history allowed housemates to take the cash and still continue in the game, However housemates will have to leave the Bigg Boss house and run outside of the house where the cash box is placed within a certain meter radius from the house's main door and pick up the box and return to the house within a selected time frame. If the housemate doesn't return to the house within the time they will lose the cash they received and will be evicted from the house hence being unable to continue the game. Each time the housemate runs for the cash box the cash will be deducted from the overall winner cash prize which was initially ₹50,00,000 lakhs. The more cash taken by housemates the lesser the prize money of the winner will be at the end of the season.

Day	Housemate	Money Box	Distance	Time Limit	Time Taken	Required Minimum Speed	Average Speed Achieved	Cash For Grabs	Result	
Day 100	Muthukumaran	Single Open Box	30 Metres X 2	15 Seconds	12 Seconds	4.00 m/s	5.00 m/s	₹ 50,000	Taken Cash	Returned in Time
Day 101	Rayan	Single Open Box	45 Metres X 2	25 Seconds	17 Seconds	3.60 m/s	5.29 m/s	₹ 200,000	Taken Cash	Returned in Time
Day 102	Pavithra	Single Open Box	45 Metres X 2	25 Seconds	23 Seconds	3.60 m/s	3.91 m/s	₹ 200,000	Taken Cash	Returned in Time
Day 102	Soundariya	Three Closed boxes	60 Metres X 2	30 Seconds	21 Seconds	4.00 m/s	-	₹ 500,000	Did Not Take Cash	Returned in Time
Day 102	Vishal	Three Closed boxes	60 Metres X 2	30 Seconds	25 Seconds	4.00 m/s	4.80 m/s	₹ 500,000	Taken Cash	Returned in Time
Day 102	Jacquline	Single Closed box	80 Metres X 2	35 Seconds	37 Seconds	4.57 m/s	4.32 m/s	₹ 800,000	Taken Cash Forfeited	Did Not Return in Time
Day 102	Jacquline	Single Closed box	80 Metres X 2	35 Seconds	37 Seconds	4.57 m/s	4.32 m/s	₹ 800,000	Evicted due to failure to complete the task on time	
Winner Cash Prize : ₹40,50,000

- Housemates can still attempt to run for the cash and return to the house midway after changing their mind if they won't wish to risk being evicted and unable to take the cash in time. If they do so they are safe and won't be evicted.

== Guest appearances ==
Week	Day	Guest(s)	Purpose of visit
Week 1	Day 0	VJ Mahalakshmi, Ramya NSK, Syamantha Kiran, Nehah Menon, Janane Prabhu, VJ Sriya Surendran	To support the contestants Ravindar, Sathya, Pavithra, VJ Vishal, Tharshika and Anshida, respectively.
Week 3	Day 19	Sivakarthikeyan	To promote the upcoming film Amaran. Released in Diwali 2024.
Week 4	Day 25	Kavin	To promote the upcoming film Bloody Beggar. Released in Diwali 2024.
Week 4	Day 28	Suja Varunee	To support the contestant Shiva Kumar.
Week 8	Day 54	Shakthi Rithvik, Iyal	To promote the web series Parachute.
Week 10	Day 68	Soori, Manju Warrier, Ken Karunas	To promote the upcoming film Viduthalai Part 2. Released in December 2024.
Week 11	Day 77	Priya Raman	To greet the evicted contestant and her husband, Ranjith.
Week 12	Day 79	Family members of Deepak, Manjari, Vishal and Rayan	As a part of the freeze task.
Week 12	Day 80	Family members of Soundariya, Raanav, Pavithra and Anshida	As a part of the freeze task.
Week 12	Day 81	Family members of Jeffry, Arun, Jacquline and Muthukumaran	As a part of the freeze task.
Week 12	Day 82	Nehah Menon, Syamantha Kiran, V Venkat Raj, Vishnu Vijay, Archana Ravichandran, Erode Mahesh	As a part of the freeze task.
Week 13	Day 91	Host Vijay Sethupathi	To announce the winner of TTF.
Week 14	Day 93-104	Ravindar, Arnav, Dharsha, Sunita, Riya, Varshini, Shiva, Sachana (Ex-Contestants)	As a part of the Wild Card Knock - Out (K.O.) task.
Week 15	Day 93-104	Ravindar, Arnav, Dharsha, Sunita, Riya, Varshini, Shiva, Sachana (Ex-Contestants)	As a part of Pongal celebrations and reunion with the housemates.
Week 15	Day 99-104	Tharshika, Sathya, Jeffry, Ranjith, Ananthi (Ex-Contestants)	As a part of Pongal celebrations and reunion with the housemates.
Week 15	Day 100- 104	Anshida (Ex-Contestant)	As a part of Pongal celebrations and reunion with the housemates.
Week 15	Day 100	Raju Jeyamohan	To promote the upcoming film, Bun Butter Jam.
Week 15	Day 100	Hari Baskar, Losliya Mariyanesan	To promote the upcoming film, Mr. Housekeeping.
Week 15	Day 101	Ma Ka Pa Anand	As a part of interview task for the finalists.
Week 15	Day 102	Vanitha Vijayakumar, Robert Master, Jovika Vijayakumar	To promote the upcoming film, Mrs & Mr.
Week 15	Day 102- 104	Raanav, Manjari, Deepak (Ex-Contestants)	For reunion with the housemates.
Week 15	Day 105	V.M.Mahalingam and band	For a musical party with the finalists.
Week 15	Day 105	Host Vijay Sethupathi	To interact with the finalists.
Week 15	Day 105	All the evicted housemates	To perform dance as a part of Grand Finale performances
Week 15	Day 106	All the evicted housemates	As a part of Grand Finale celebrations.

== Weekly summary ==
The main events in the Bigg Boss 8 house are summarised in the table below.

Week 1	Entrances	Ravindar, Sachana, Dharsha, Sathya, Deepak, Ananthi, Sunita, Jeffry, Ranjith, Pavithra, Soundariya, Arun, Tharshika, Vishal, Anshida, Arnav, Muthukumaran and Jacquline entered the Bigg Boss house on Day 1. On Day 5, Sachana re-entered te house after being evicted by housemates.
Week 1	Twists	Boys vs Girls theme: On launch day, the housemates from each team must choose which portion of the house they will occupy, based on the Boys Vs Girls theme. Team Boys proposed that Team Girls not nominate anyone from Team Boys on a week that they choose. The housemates from the Team Girls accepted this condition and occupied the left portion of the house while the Team Boys occupied the right portion of the house. 24 hours eviction: Host Vijay Sethupathi announced that for the first time in Bigg Boss history there will be an eviction within 24 hours of the grand launch. On Day 1, Sachana was evicted by fellow housemates. Contestant swap and direct nomination power: On Day 2, one member from each team, Muthukumaran and Pavithra, were switched to the opposing teams. Bigg Boss entitled them to directly nominate a contestant for the eviction process. Mixed nomination process: The nominations for the Week 1 eviction process will be based on each participant being free to nominate members of either team. Viduthalai pass (Nomination free pass): On Day 5, each team was allowed to decide among themselves, one member from each house to be given the Nomination free pass which can be used by the recipients to save themselves from the Week 2 nomination process. Re-entry: Sachana Namidass re-entered the house on Day 5, after being evicted by the housemates within the 24-hour eviction process, which was announced by Vijay Sethupathi on the launch episode.
Week 1	Captaincy Task	Thalaivana Thalaiviaa (Naarkali yaaru Gaali): The boys and girls teams will be placed in each side with eight chairs lined up. When the buzzer is rung one housemate from each team will run to the opposite side chair and sit on it. The last person to not be eliminated will win the captaincy task and become the house captain for Week 1.
Week 1	Captaincy Task	Winner: Tharshika
Week 1	Captaincy Task	Lost: Remaining housemates
Week 1	House Captain	Tharshika
Week 1	Nominations	Anshida, Arnav, Jacquline, Muthukumaran, Ravindar, Sachana and Sathya were nominated for the Week 1 open eviction process by housemates.
Week 1	Nominations	Arun, Jacquline, Muthukumaran, Ranjith, Ravindar and Soundariya were nominated for the Week 1 eviction process.
Week 1	Tasks	House chores task (Vaa ma Minnal): There will be 5 sets of challenges. 5 housemates from each team will participate in the challenge. The losing team will have to do the work around the house for all of Week 1. Supervisor: Tharshika: Task 1 - (Making a round Chappati): There are two Chappati flours on a table for each player. The first player to complete a round chappati will win this task.; Task 2 - (Three rows and columns Kolam): There are two Kolam powders on a table for each player. The first player to correctly draw a Kolam in three rows and columns will win this task.; Task 3 - (Change the diaper of a baby doll): There are two baby dolls on a table for each player. The first player to successfully change a doll's diaper will win this task.; Task 4 - (Cool drink in one gulp): There are two beverages on a table for each player. The player who finishes their drink in one gulp first will win this task.; Task 5 - (Illuminating the bulbs): There are two twisted wires with miniature bulbs, as well as a plug outlet for each player on their table. The player who manages to untangle their wires and connects them to the socket first, making all of their little bulbs illuminate, will win the task.; Task / Team Boys / vs / Team Girls / Winner; 1 / Jeffry / vs / Jacquline / Jacquline; 2 / Pavithra / vs / Dharsha / Dharsha; 3 / Sathya / vs / Sunita / Sathya; 4 / Arnav / vs / Soundariya / Arnav; 5 / Arun / vs / Muthukumaran / Arun
Week 1	Tasks	Winner: Team Boys (won 3/5 tasks)
Week 1	Tasks	Lost: Team Girls (won 2/5 tasks)
Week 1	Tasks	Weekly task (Pota Poti): Team Boys and Team Girls have two rounds of debate and will decide which gender is capable of achieving more in life and why their gender is superior.: Round 1 - Who is better, Boys or Girls?; Team Boys: Ravindar and Vishal; Team Girls: Ananthi and Muthukumaran; Judges: Arnav and Jacquline; Round 2 - Who is better, Mother or Father?; Team Boys: Arnav; Team Girls: Jacquline; Judges: Muthukumaran and Ranjith
Week 1	Tasks	Winner: Team Girls (won 2/2 rounds)
Week 1	Tasks	Lost: Team Boys (won 0/2 rounds)
Week 1	Tasks	Viduthalai pass (nomination free pass): Both team boys and girls will need to discuss among their group and pick a housemate from each of their own groups to decide who is worthy to be given the nomination free pass power for the Week 2 nomination process. Team Boys selected Arun as their candidate, but Team Girls could not select a housemate from their team, so only Arun won the pass and was saved from Week 2 elimination.
Week 1	Sponsored	—N/a
Week 1	Punishments	Team Girls will need to do a whole week of house chores after losing the House chores task.
Week 1	Exits	On Day 1, Sachana Namidass was evicted after facing the housemates votes during open nomination.
Week 1	Exits	On Day 7, Ravindar Chandrasekar was evicted after facing public votes.
Week 2	Twists	Opposite nomination process: The nominations for the Week 2 eviction process will be based on team members nominating participants from the opposing team. Contestant swap and direct nomination power: On Day 8, one member from each team, Deepak and Dharsha, were switched to the opposing teams. Bigg Boss entitled them to directly nominate a contestant for the eviction process. Weekly nomination free pass: Both teams could earn the Nomination free pass and award it to one of their teammates, granting them immunity from the Week 2 eviction process, by winning 2 of 3 tasks testing their knowledge, skill and teamwork. On Day 12, Team Girls won most of the tasks and awarded the pass to Jacquline. Goibibo passport stamp: Ranjith and Tharshika were chosen as the best performers by their respective teams based on their overall performance during Week 2.
Week 2	Captaincy Task	Thalaivana Thalaiviaa (Block la Lock): Six wooden blocks labelled with numbers ranging from 1 to 6 is arranged in the garden area. When the buzzer sounds, all the six participants (three from each team) for Captaincy task will stand on each of those blocks. A die with red and blue faces is kept on the opposite side of the blocks. One member from each team rolls the die. If it lands with blue facing up, a female participant selects a male participant to remove their wooden block, whereas if the die lands with red facing up, the opposite will happen. The participant, once chosen, has the choice to switch over to any of the other available blocks before the buzzer sounds again failing which may result in their elimination. The last person not eliminated will win the captaincy task and become the house captain for Week 2. Supervisor: Tharshika
Week 2	Captaincy Task	Winner: Sathya
Week 2	Captaincy Task	Lost: Deepak, Jacquline, Pavithra, Soundariya and Vishal
Week 2	House Captain	Sathya
Week 2	Nominations	Deepak and Jacquline were directly nominated by Pavithra and Muthukumaran using their Direct nomination power from Week 1 for the Week 2 eviction process.
Week 2	Nominations	Arnav, Dharsha, Jeffry, Muthukumaran, Ranjith, Sachana, Soundariya and Vishal were nominated for the Week 2 eviction process.
Week 2	Tasks	Shopping task (Uruttu): There are two levels in this task, Levels 1 and 2. Each team will choose someone to participate on their behalf. The selected competitors will wear the given jacket and must apply glue all over it. Bigg Boss (BB) currency will be spread throughout the garden. When the buzzer sounds, both competitors will roll themselves along with their jacket and collect as much BB currency as possible on their jackets by making it stick to them. They will be able to use the BB currency collected from this task for their respective teams. When the buzzer sounds again, signalling the end of this task, both of them will report to the currency counting area to determine the exact amount of money collected by each team. Team Boys: Arnav and Arun; Team Girls: Sachana and Sunita; Supervisor: Sathya
Week 2	Tasks	Team Boys (collected 8700 BB currency)
Week 2	Tasks	Team Girls (collected 7600 BB currency)
Week 2	Tasks	House chores task (Ulla Veliya): All the housemates will assemble in the activity area and stand on the two yellow lines, one for each team. Both teams will need to complete a puzzle with photos of members of the opposing team. When the buzzer sounds, one member from each team will approach the board and solve the puzzle. This game will carry on the basis of a relay system. Members who completely solve one puzzle will be moved to the red line zone. The team which completes this task first will not be required to do any housework for the whole week. The losing team will do the household chores for that week. Supervisor: Sathya
Week 2	Tasks	Winner: Team Girls
Week 2	Tasks	Lost: Team Boys
Week 2	Tasks	Weekly task (King TV vs Queen TV): Team Boys will control King TV while Team Girls will control Queen TV. Each team will choose a member to act as their CEO, who will make all the decisions for their respective team. Before the task begins, the CEO's from both teams will hold their individual press conferences while the members from the opposing team will act as reporters. Each team will need to host special shows such as music shows, debate why their TV is superior then their opponents' channel and record a higher viewership. One member from each team will judge the performances of King TV and Queen TV. Judges: Ananthi and Arun
Week 2	Tasks	Winner: Team Boys (King TV)
Week 2	Tasks	Lost: Team Girls (Queen TV)
Week 2	Tasks	Ranking task: Each housemate has to rank themselves with a valid reason stating why they deserve good ranking positions in the King TV vs Queen TV task from 1 to 17 in order, with 1 being the best and 17 being the worst.: Rank / Contestants; 1 / Muthukumaran; 2 / Vishal; 3 / Ananthi; 4 / Jacquline; 5 / Tharshika; 6 / Ranjith; 7 / Pavithra; 8 / Deepak; 9 / Jefry; 10 / Arun; 11 / Dharsha; 12 / Sathya; 13 / Sunita; 14 / Sachana; 15 / Anshida; 16 / Arnav; 17 / Soundariya
Week 2	Tasks	Weekly nomination free pass tasks: There are three levels to this task: 1) Level 1 - Knowledge task (Yaaru Gethu): This round will test the knowledge of all housemates. Team Boys and Team Girls will be seated opposite each other and asked common sense and historical questions by Bigg Boss. Participants who know the answer will need to press the buzzer first and provide the correct answer to earn points. A correct answer rewards their team with 5 points, but an incorrect answer will deduct 5 points. The team which obtains the most points after answering 20 questions wins.
Week 2	Tasks	Winner: Team Girls (obtained 40 points)
Week 2	Tasks	Lost: Team Boys (obtained 20 points)
Week 2	Tasks	2) Level 2 - Skill task (Cup ku kotayaa Kanavu kotayaa): This round will test the skill of housemates and how they focus, especially under pressure. There will be a circle in the garden area with a table in the middle of it. One person from each team chosen needs to stack 45 cups to build a tower. When the buzzer sounds, the chosen person can start building the tower, but while doing so will be opposed by 3 housemates from the opposite team. The opposing housemates will throw balls to disrupt the person building the tower. The person stacking the tower can call 3 of their teammates to defend their tower but only after they have built the base of the tower. If the person is able to build the tower within the allotted time, then their team wins. Each team will have three minutes for this task. Supervisor: Sathya: Rounds / Cup stacker / Defenders / Disrupters / Total cups stacked; 1 / Muthukumaran / Arnav, Ranjith, Sathya / Deepak, Jacquline, Sunita / 14; 2 / Tharshika / Anshida, Pavithra, Soundariya / Arun, Jeffry, Vishal / 10
Week 2	Tasks	Winner: Team Boys (stacked 14 cups)
Week 2	Tasks	Lost: Team Girls (stacked 10 cups)
Week 2	Tasks	3) Level 3 - Teamwork task (Nyaabagam Varuthe Nyaabagam Varuthe): This round will test the teamwork and memory ability of housemates. Three members will be chosen to represent each team. Each person one at a time from a team will enter the confession room and memorize the list of 15 items displayed on the TV. Memorizing the order of the items shown in the list is important. After doing so, each one will enter the activity area, and assemble the given items from the table on the 15 pedestals labelled with numbers 1 to 15 preserving the order of the items in the list. After arranging, finally they must name the items along with their respective numbers to complete this task. Each item positioned correctly will award them with a point. The team that obtains the most points wins this task. Potential total points per person: 15; Potential total points per team: 45: Team / Participants / Points obtained / Total points obtained; Boys / Arnav / 4 / 24; Boys / Dharsha / 5 / 24; Boys / Muthukumaran / 15 / 24; Girls / Ananthi / 7 / 25; Girls / Pavithra / 8 / 25; Girls / Tharshika / 10 / 25
Week 2	Tasks	Winner: Team Girls (obtained 25/45 points)
Week 2	Tasks	Lost: Team Boys (obtained 24/45 points)
Week 2	Sponsored	—N/a
Week 2	Punishments	Team Boys will need to do a whole week of house chores after losing the House chores task.; Arnav and Sachana were voted among the housemates as the least productive housemates, and Bigg Boss punished them by tying them to each other with handcuffs for 24 hours.
Week 2	Exits	On Day 14, Arnav Amjath was evicted after facing public votes.
Week 3	Twists	Contestant swap and direct nomination power: On Day 15, Jeffry and Sachana were switched to the opposing teams. Bigg Boss entitled them to nominate a contestant for the eviction process. Mixed nomination process: The nominations for the Week 3 eviction process will be based on each team nominating members of either team. Weekly nomination free pass: Both teams could earn the Nomination free pass and award it to one of their teammates, granting them immunity from the Week 3 eviction process, by winning 2 of 3 tasks testing their teamwork, intelligence, and patience. On Day 19, Team Girls won most of the tasks and awarded the pass to Pavithra. Goibibo passport stamp: Ananthi and Muthukumaran were chosen as the best performers by their respective teams based on their overall performance during Week 3.
Week 3	Captaincy Task	Thalaivana Thalaiviaa (Quack Quack): Ranjith and Tharshika were chosen as the contenders for this task during Week 2 after being declared the best performers by their respective teams. This task will be held in the activity area. Both contenders will be blindfolded and handed with a soft bat one at a time. Six housemates from the opposite teams will have a rubber duck tied to both legs. When the buzzer sounds, the contender, when blindfolded, will try to hit the opposing housemates with their bat to eliminate them from the game. The contender who eliminates the most housemates from the opposing team in the shortest amount of time will win the captaincy task and become the house captain for Week 3. Supervisor: Sathya
Week 3	Captaincy Task	Winner: Tharshika
Week 3	Captaincy Task	Lost: Ranjith
Week 3	House Captain	Tharshika
Week 3	Nominations	Arun and Dharsha were directly nominated by Dharsha and Deepak using their Direct nomination power from Week 2 for the Week 3 eviction process.
Week 3	Nominations	Anshida, Jacquline, Muthukumaran, Pavithra, Sathya, and Soundariya were nominated for the Week 3 eviction process.
Week 3	Tasks	Shopping task (Bumper Bonanza): Three members from each team will participate in this task. This task will be held in the garden area. Three denominations of BB currency (500 BB, 1000 BB, and 2000 BB) will be placed on three podiums respectively. The potential BB currency earned from this task is 35,000 BB currency. An elastic rope along with some balls will be given for this task. Two of the three members must hold both ends of the elastic rope while the third member must use the ball along with a rope similar to a catapult to launch and aim it towards the arrow marked on the intended denomination of BB currency when the buzzer sounds. Each team will receive ten chances in each of the two rounds. The BB currency earned from this task can be used by each team to purchase their food items from the shop.: Rounds / Team; Rounds / Boys / Girls; 1 / Arun, Sathya, Vishal / Pavithra, Soundariya, Sunita; 2 / Deepak, Muthukumaran, Ranjith / Jeffry, Pavithra, Soundariya; Supervisor: Tharshika
Week 3	Tasks	Team Boys (collected 5500 BB currency)
Week 3	Tasks	Team Girls (collected 2000 BB currency)
Week 3	Tasks	Weekly task (Bigg Boss Star hotel): The two teams will be divided and take roles as hotel staff and the other group as hotel guests. Each team is part of the hotel department and will need to select a manager, chefs, room, and housekeepers to look after the customers visiting the hotel. Bigg Boss Star Hotel: Rounds / Customers / Hotel employees; Rounds / Customers / Manager / / Chefs / / Housekeeping / / Room service / / Receptionist; Rounds / Customers / Before dismissal / After dismissal / Under 1st manager / Under 2nd manager / Under 1st manager / Under 2nd manager / Under 1st manager / Under 2nd manager / Under 1st manager / Under 2nd manager; 1 / Team Boys / Pavithra / Sunita / Anshida, Sunita, Ananthi / Dharsha, Jeffry, Tharshika / Soundariya, Jeffry / Pavithra, Anshida / Dharsha, Tharshika / Jacquline, Soundariya / Jacquline / Ananthi; 2 / Team Girls / Muthukumaran / Vishal / Deepak, Ranjith, Sachana / / Sathya, Arun / Muthukumaran, Arun / Sathya, Arun / Muthukumaran, Arun / Vishal / Sathya; 3 / Muthukumaran, Ranjith, Sunita, Pavithra, Arun, Dharsha, Jeffry, Tharshika / Soundariya / NA / Jacquline, Vishal, Anshida / NA / Sachana, Sathya(SPA) / NA / Ananthi, Sachana / NA / Deepak / NA
Week 3	Tasks	Weekly nomination free pass tasks: There are three levels to this task: 1) Level 1 - Teamwork task (Killer coin): This round will test the housemates' teamwork. A coin engraved with the words "Killer coin" will be kept in the middle of the garden area. This task will last for five rounds. When the buzzer sounds at the start of each round, all participating members from both teams will need to try to take the coin. Once they do so, they may either attempt to stick the killer coin on the jacket of the opposing team members or pass it to their teammates. When the buzzer sounds at the end of each round, the person who either has the coin in their hands or has the coin stuck on their jacket will be eliminated from this task. The team with the most surviving members at the end of the fifth round will win this task. Supervisors: Ananthi and Anshida
Week 3	Tasks	Winner: Team Boys
Week 3	Tasks	Lost: Team Girls
Week 3	Tasks	2) Level 2 - Intelligence task (Dumb charades): This round will test the housemates' intelligence. A bowl containing chits of paper with the names of movies will be kept in the activity area. Two members from each team will participate at a time. The first person will pick a chit from the bowl and assist the second person to guess the name of the movie they received through their gestures. Similarly, the second person will assist the next person from their team to guess the movie. This task will continue based on a relay system. The time allocated to guess the name of each movie is 90 seconds. The team that correctly names the most movies after ten chances will win this task. Team Boys: Arun, Deepak, Muthukumaran, Ranjith, Sachana, Sathya and Vishal; Team Girls: Ananthi, Dharsha, Jacquline, Pavithra, Tharshika and Soundariya
Week 3	Tasks	Winner: Team Girls (obtained 7/10 points)
Week 3	Tasks	Lost: Team Boys (obtained 5/10 points)
Week 3	Tasks	3) Level 3 - Patience task: This round will test the patience of housemates. Each team will send two members to participate and they will need to carefully put three balls into three holes using a thin thread. If they drop the ball they will receive no points and are required to start again from the beginning. Team Boys: Arun, Muthukumaran, Sathya; Supporters for Team Boys: Deepak, Ranjith, and Vishal; Team Girls: Jacquline, Pavithra, and Soundariya; Supporters for Team Girls: Ananthi, Anshida, and Dharsha
Week 3	Tasks	Winner: Team Girls (obtained 6 points)
Week 3	Tasks	Lost: Team Boys (obtained 3 points)
Week 3	Sponsored	Nandu White Dhothis Ramp Walk task: Housemates will wear clothes sponsored by Nandu Clothing and do a mini-fashion show with a ramp walk. Judges: Deepak and Jacquline Mr Nandu White Dhothi Icon Star winner: Vishal; Ms. Nandu White Dhothi Icon Star winner: Pavithra
Week 3	Punishments	—N/a
Week 3	Exits	On Day 21, Dharsha Gupta was evicted after facing public votes.
Week 4	Entrances	Riya, Raanav, Varshini, Manjari, Shiva, and Rayan entered the Bigg Boss house on Day 28.
Week 4	Twists	Opposite nomination process: The nominations for the Week 4 eviction process will be based on each team nominating members from the opposing team. Contestant swap and direct nomination power: On Day 22, one member from each team, Vishal and Soundariya, were switched to the opposing teams. Bigg Boss entitled them directly to nominate a contestant for the eviction process. Weekly nomination free pass: Both teams could earn the Nomination free pass and award it to one of their teammates, granting them immunity from the Week 4 eviction process, by winning 2 of 3 tasks testing their teamwork, intelligence, and memory. On Day 26, Team Girls won most of the tasks and awarded the pass to Sunita. Goibibo passport stamp: Ananthi and Sathya were chosen as the best performers by their respective teams based on their overall performance during Week 4.
Week 4	Captaincy Task	Thalaivana Thalaiviaa (Twist mela twist): Ananthi and Muthukumaran were chosen as the contenders for this task during Week 3 after being determined to be the best performers by their respective teams. This task took place in the outdoor area where there will be cards scattered over the lawn with wording embedded in as "Captain King" and "Captain Queen". Each contender will need to flip the card in their favour and the amount of cards with either King or Queen faced up will win the captaincy task and become the house captain for Week 4. Supervisor: Tharshika
Week 4	Captaincy Task	Winner: Muthukumaran
Week 4	Captaincy Task	Lost: Ananthi
Week 4	House Captain	Muthukumaran
Week 4	Nominations	Anshida and Deepak were directly nominated by Jeffry and Sachana using their Direct nomination power from Week 3 for the Week 4 eviction process.
Week 4	Nominations	Arun, Jacquline, Jeffry, Pavithra, Ranjith, Sathya, and Sunita were nominated for the Week 4 eviction process.
Week 4	Tasks	Shopping task (Balance Pannu Mothamma allu): Six pipes and a bowl containing 10 balls are placed in the garden area. Each ball has a value labeled on it. Three players from each team will participate in this task. Each player can hold 1 pipe per hand respectively. When the buzzer sounds, the first player must balance the ball on the first pipe and guide it to the second pipe, following which the first player must then balance the ball on the second pipe and guide it to the third pipe of the second player. This process will apply to the second and third players similarly. If the third player balances the ball on the second pipe and guides it to the holder, the value of that ball will be awarded to their team. Players must not use their hands to guide the ball from one pipe to another. If any player drops the ball during this process, then that particular turn will be discarded and they will be required to restart the entire process. The balance implemented in this task will determine the shopping budget for both teams this week. Team Boys: Arun, Deepak, Jeffry and Sathya; Team Girls: Anshida, Pavithra, Sachana and Tharshika; Supervisor: Muthukumaran
Week 4	Tasks	Team Boys (collected 8400 BB currency)
Week 4	Tasks	Team Girls (collected 6600 BB currency)
Week 4	Tasks	House chores task (Naan veezhven endru ninaithayo): This task will be held in the garden area and comprises 7 rounds in total. An even number of players will participate in this task. Sponge bats and boxes will be provided for this task. In each round, one player from each team will compete against a player from the opposing team. Both of them must hold the sponge bat in one hand and the box on the other. When the buzzer sounds, the competing players must use their sponge bat to knock out the box from their opponent while defending their own box. The player who does so will be awarded a point. The team with the most points at the end of the 7th round will win. Supervisor: Pavithra: Team Boys / vs / Team Girls / Winner; Muthukumaran / vs / Ananthi / Muthukumaran; Jeffry / vs / Sachana / Jeffry; Sathya / vs / Vishal / Sathya; Soundariya / vs / Anshida / Soundariya; Deepak / vs / Jacquline / Jacquline; Arun / vs / Tharshika / Arun; Ranjith / vs / Sunita / Sunita
Week 4	Tasks	Winner: Team Boys (obtained 5/7 points)
Week 4	Tasks	Lost: Team Girls (obtained 2/7 points)
Week 4	Tasks	Weekly task (Aal Maaratam): Each housemate will imitate another housemate from his or her team. They will imitate the behavior, dressing sense, and mannerisms of other housemates.: Housemate / Acting as; Jacquline / Anshida; Anshida / Jacquline; Pavithra / Tharshika; Tharshika / Pavithra; Sunita / Sachana; Sachana / Ananthi; Ananthi / Soundariya; Soundariya / Sunita; Arun / Sathya; Sathya / Arun; Muthukumaran / Ranjith; Ranjith / Jeffry; Jeffry / Deepak; Deepak / Vishal; Vishal / Muthukumaran
Week 4	Tasks	Interviewing the wildcards: This task held in the activity area. The activity area includes cue cards, two stamps labeled Selected and Waiting List, as well as eleven chairs, eight for original entries and three for wildcard entries. Team Boys will interview the boys from the new wildcards, while Team Girls will interview the girls from the new wildcards. They can clear any doubts and set expectations for the wildcards. The wildcards, in turn, must impress the interviewers by explaining how they will contribute to their team. The interviewers must select two of the three wildcards who stand out during this interview by writing their names on the cue cards using the Selected stamp and stating their valid reasons. The wildcard who receives the Waiting List stamp from the interviewers must stay in the garden area until the next announcement from Bigg Boss.: Team / Wildcards / Result; Boys / Raanav / Waiting list; Boys / Rayan / Selected; Boys / Shiva / Selected; Girls / Manjari / Selected; Girls / Riya / Selected; Girls / Varshini / Waiting list
Week 4	Tasks	Weekly nomination free pass tasks: There are three levels to this task: 1) Level 1 - Teamwork task (Ready Steady rope): This round will test the housemates' teamwork. Three members from the boys' team and three members from the girls' team must participate in this task. The task involves a rope to which all 6 housemates are attached and they will have to reach out to their set of colored balls and put them in a basket while the opposing housemates will try to pull the rope away from them, preventing them from completing the task. Team Boys: Jeffry, Muthukumaran, and Sathya; Team Girls: Sachana, Sunita, and Vishal
Week 4	Tasks	Winner: Team Boys
Week 4	Tasks	Lost: Team Girls
Week 4	Tasks	2) Level 2 - Intelligence task (Sink or Float): This round will test the housemates' intelligence. This task will be held in the activity area there will be a box containing various items and a glass tank filled with water. Three members from each team will participate in this task. Each of them will be given two cards, one containing the word Sink and the other containing the word Float. Once an item is drawn, the players must determine whether it will sink or float in the water present in the glass tank using one of their two cards. There are 20 items. The team that obtains the most points, by guessing the correct answer for each item, will win this task. Supervisor: Muthukumaran: Team / Participants / Points obtained / Total points obtained; Boys / Deepak / 15 / 40; Boys / Ranjith / 11 / 40; Boys / Soundariya / 14 / 40; Girls / Ananthi / 17 / 48; Girls / Jacquline / 17 / 48; Girls / Tharshika / 14 / 48
Week 4	Tasks	Winner: Team Girls (obtained 48 points)
Week 4	Tasks	Lost: Team Boys (obtained 40 points)
Week 4	Tasks	3) Level 3 - Memory task (Aattama Therottama): This round will test the housemates' memories. Three members from each team will participate. This task will be held in the garden area, where a performance will be dedicated to the players. Afterward, the players must answer "true" or "false" to 15 questions based on the performance. The team that correctly answers the most questions will win this task. Supervisor: Muthukumaran: Team / Participants / Points obtained / Total points obtained; Boys / Arun / 11 / 31; Boys / Jeffry / 10 / 31; Boys / Sathya / 10 / 31; Girls / Ananthi / 11 / 36; Girls / Pavithra / 11 / 36; Girls / Sunita / 14 / 36
Week 4	Tasks	Winner: Team Girls (obtained 36 points)
Week 4	Tasks	Lost: Team Boys (obtained 31 points)
Week 4	Sponsored	Gold Winner Palagaaram task: The housemates from each team will need to make Palagaaram food by using the given Gold Winner food products and must exchange and share the food items to celebrate Diwali, the festival of lights. Palagaaram food made by Team Boys: Murukku; Palagaaram food made by Team Girls: Adhirsam
Week 4	Punishments	Team Girls will need to do a whole week of house chores after losing the House chores task.; Jeffry and Sachana were voted among the housemates as the least productive housemates to the house and Bigg Boss gave them a punishment to become invisible until the next announcement from Bigg Boss.
Week 4	Exits	No eviction due to Diwali week.
Week 5	Twists	Opposite open nomination process: The nomination for the Week 5 eviction process will be based on each team member nominating members from the opposing team in the presence of all housemates. Contestant swap and direct nomination power: On Day 29, one member from each team, Raanav, and Jacquline, were switched to the opposing teams. Bigg Boss entitled them to directly nominate a contestant for the eviction process. Weekly nomination free pass: Both teams could earn the Nomination free pass and award it to one of their teammates, granting them immunity from the Week 5 eviction process, by winning 2 of 3 tasks testing their focus and coordination. On Day 31, Team Boys won most of the tasks and awarded the pass to Ranjith. Goibibo passport stamp: Arun and Soundariya were chosen as the best performers by their respective teams based on their overall performance during Week 5.
Week 5	Captaincy Task	Thalaivana Thalaiviaa (Ball mela Ball, Balance panna poradhu yaaru): Ananthi and Sathya were chosen as the contenders for this task during Week 4 after being determined to be the best performers by their respective teams. Two wobbly platforms containing three holders each are placed in the garden area. Both contenders must stand on each of those platforms. One member from each team will act as a supporter for them. The supporter must stand in the marked zone and throw one ball at a time to the contender from their respective teams. The contenders must receive the balls thrown at them and place exactly three balls on the holders while simultaneously maintaining their balance on the wobbly platform. The contender who manages to do so will win the captaincy task and become the house captain for Week 5. Supporters for captaincy contender Sathya: Muthukumaran; Supporters for captaincy contender Ananthi: Jacquline; Supervisor: Muthukumaran
Week 5	Captaincy Task	Winner: Sathya
Week 5	Captaincy Task	Lost: Ananthi
Week 5	House Captain	Sathya
Week 5	Nominations	Jacquline and Vishal were directly nominated by Vishal and Soundariya using their Direct nomination power from Week 4 for the Week 5 eviction process.
Week 5	Nominations	Ananthi, Anshida, Arun, Deepak, Muthukumaran, Pavithra, Ranjith, Sachana, and Sunita were nominated in the presence of all housemates for the Week 5 eviction process.
Week 5	Tasks	Shopping task (Shopping vettai): A board with numerous holes is placed in the garden area. Five members from each team will participate in this task. The board has a holder in the center, and ropes are fastened to either side. The goal is to place one ball at a time in the holder and navigate it from the lower through the upper portions of the holes to the top hole with a red ring marked along its circumference on the board while simultaneously preventing it from ending up in any other holes. This task will adhere to a relay system. One thousand BB currency will be awarded for each ball in the top hole. The level of attentiveness implemented in this task will determine the shopping budget for both teams this week. Team Boys: Deepak, Jeffry, Muthukumaran, Ranjith and Shiva; Team Girls: Raanav, Riya, Sachana, Soundariya and Varshini; Supervisor: Sathya
Week 5	Tasks	Team Girls (collected 7000 BB currency)
Week 5	Tasks	Team Boys (collected 3000 BB currency)
Week 5	Tasks	House chores task: A table is placed in the activity area, with a ring in the center. Ten little rolling logs and two sticks are placed on opposite sides of the table. Two players from each team will face off in each round. When the buzzer sounds, the players must use the stick to select a rolling log and toss it to their opponent's side. When the final buzzer sounds, the player with the fewest rolling logs on their side wins. A point is awarded for each team. The team that obtains the most points will win this task. Supervisor: Sathya: Team Boys / vs / Team Girls / Winner; Deepak / vs / Sunita / Deepak; Muthukumaran / vs / Manjari / Muthukumaran; Vishal / vs / Pavithra / Vishal
Week 5	Tasks	Winner: Team Boys (obtained 3/3 points)
Week 5	Tasks	Lost: Team Girls (obtained 0/3 points)
Week 5	Tasks	Weekly task (Naan kadanthu vantha pathai): Five housemates will be given three minutes to narrate their life story without interruption, including both their challenges and successes, to engage with the audience on Days 30, 31, and 32 respectively. The wildcard entries will act as judges for this task. They will determine whether or not to let the housemates tell their complete story after the first three minutes. They can do so by showing a thumbs-down card with a stop sign labeled on it. If at least three of the six judges show the stop sign card any time after three minutes, the housemates will be unable to complete their story and receive a bomb placed on the pedestal. At the end of the storytelling, the remaining housemates can ask questions to clarify their doubts. The housemate who has the bomb in possession at the end of this week will be directly nominated for the Week 6 eviction process. Judges: Manjari, Raanav, Rayan, Riya, Shiva and Varshini Result: Deepak was directly nominated for the Week 6 eviction process.: Day / Housemates who conveyed their story / Interrupted by / Housemate(s) in possession of the bomb; 30 / Jeffry / Manjari / Deepak; 30 / Sachana / Varshini / Deepak; 30 / Deepak / Manjari, Riya, Varshini / Deepak; 30 / Vishal / Manjari, Riya, Varshini / Deepak; 30 / Muthukumaran / None / Deepak; 31 / Pavithra / Varshini / Deepak; 31 / Jacquline / None / Deepak; 31 / Tharshika / None / Deepak; 31 / Anshida / Varshini / Deepak; 31 / Sathya / None / Deepak; 32 / Soundariya / None / Deepak; 32 / Arun / None / Deepak; 32 / Sunita / Manjari, Varshini / Deepak; 32 / Ananthi / None / Deepak; 32 / Ranjith / None / Deepak
Week 5	Tasks	Morning activity task: This task is held in the living area.: Day 31 - Identify the manipulator and the manipulated: Every housemate must choose two individuals from each team whom they feel are manipulating their fellow housemates, as well as two housemates whom they feel are being manipulated.; Day 32 - Assigning nicknames to housemates: Every housemate must choose one person from each team and give them nicknames based on their personalities, mannerisms, and Bigg Boss incidents so far this season.; Day 33 - Enhancing basic characteristics: Every housemate must choose one person and tell them how to improve their mannerisms, styling, and grooming.
Week 5	Tasks	Anonymous letter task (Motta kaduthasi): Every housemate may choose any number of persons and write a letter to them anonymously, conveying their thoughts and opinions without hesitation.
Week 5	Tasks	Weekly nomination free pass tasks: There are three levels to this task: 1) Level 1 - Focus task (One pitch): This round will test the housemates' focus. This task is held in the garden area. Five members from each team will participate in this task. There are two parts to this task: Part 1: A bowl full of balls is kept on one side of a table, while a basket is kept on the other side. The players must pitch a ball once on the ground and pocket it into the basket. The players who do so will proceed to Part 2 of this task.; Part 2: A wooden board with five columns is kept on the table. Four of the five columns are filled with balls with a mixture of red and blue colors. The boys' team will use blue balls, while the girls' team will use red balls. To win this task, both teams can use the vacant column in the center of the board to fill any two columns with their assigned balls.; Team Boys: Jeffry, Muthukumaran, Ranjith, Rayan and Vishal; Team Girls: Ananthi, Anshida, Pavithra, Sachana and Tharshika; Supervisor: Sathya
Week 5	Tasks	Winner: Team Boys
Week 5	Tasks	Lost: Team Girls
Week 5	Tasks	2) Level 2 - Coordination task (Thadai athai udai): This round will test the housemates' coordination. A table containing five obstacles is kept in the activity area. Five members from each team will participate in this task. A ball must be taken by the first player, who must then use the bat to tap it through the first obstacle's hole and deliver it to the second player. After receiving the ball from the first player, the second player must similarly use the bat to tap it through the second obstacle's hole and deliver it to the third player. This task will adhere to a relay system. The team that passes the most balls through all five obstacles in the allotted time will win this task. Team Boys: Arun, Jeffry, Rayan, Sathya and Vishal; Team Girls: Anshida, Manjari, Sachana, Soundariya and Varshini
Week 5	Tasks	Winner: Team Boys
Week 5	Tasks	Lost: Team Girls
Week 5	Tasks	3) Level 3: This task was canceled since the boys' team had already won the first two Nomination free pass tasks.
Week 5	Tasks	Task Cancelled
Week 5	Sponsored	—N/a
Week 5	Punishments	Team Girls will need to do a whole week of house chores after losing the House chores task.; The housemate who receives the bomb as part of the weekly task must take it with them everywhere at all times except while sleeping and using the restroom.; Muthukumaran and Varshini were voted the least productive housemates, and Bigg Boss punished them by making them learn how to perform properly, staying near Arun and Soundariya till the next Bigg Boss announcement.
Week 5	Exits	On Day 35, Sunita Gogoi was evicted after facing public votes.
Week 6	Twists	Captain's crown and cape: The house captain for Week 6 (Arun) must wear the assigned captain's crown and cape. The cape has five strings of varying colors. Whenever the Bigg Boss dog barks or Bigg Boss makes an announcement about wearing the mic correctly, the house captain must administer a punishment of his choice to one of the housemates on behalf of the one who made the mistake. Any housemate may remove one of the strings on the back of the house captain's cape at any time throughout the week if they believe the house captain is not entertaining, is not properly leading the house, or is biased. They must give valid reasons to the other housemates in the living area. If all five strings are removed before the end of the week, they will lose their position as house captain. Captaincy status: The house captain (Arun) had 3 strings remaining on his cape at the end of Week 6. Opposite open nomination process: The nomination for the Week 6 eviction process will be based on each team member nominating members from the opposing team in the presence of all housemates. Contestant swap and direct nomination power: On Day 36, one member from each team, Rayan and Anshida, were switched to the opposing teams. Bigg Boss entitled them to directly nominate a contestant for the eviction process. Weekly nomination free pass: Both teams could earn the Nomination free pass and award it to one of their teammates, granting them immunity from the Week 6 eviction process, by winning 2 of 3 tasks testing their teamwork, intelligence, and skill. On Day 40, Team Boys won most of the tasks and awarded the pass to Deepak. Goibibo passport stamp: Manjari and Vishal were chosen as the best performers by their respective teams based on their overall performance during Week 6.
Week 6	Captaincy Task	Thalaivana Thalaiviaa (Oru kutchi Oru kaalu): Arun and Soundariya were chosen as the contenders for this task during Week 5 after being determined to be the best performers by their respective teams. In the activity area, there are two sticks, a start sign, and an end sign. Five members from each team will help their respective contenders with this task. The contender, together with one team member at a time must use one leg to hold the stick while sprinting forward toward the end sign. If the contender or their team member drops their stick at any stage, the task will restart with that specific team member. The first contender to guide all five members of their team to the end sign will win the captaincy task and become the house captain for Week 6. Supporters for captaincy contender Arun: Jeffry, Muthukumaran, Rayan, Sathya, and Vishal; Supporters for captaincy contender Soundariya: Anshida, Pavithra, Sunita, Tharshika and Varshini; Supervisor: Deepak
Week 6	Captaincy Task	Winner: Arun
Week 6	Captaincy Task	Lost: Soundariya
Week 6	House Captain	Arun
Week 6	Nominations	Deepak was directly nominated for the Week 6 eviction process after possessing the bomb at the end of the weekly task during Week 5. Shiva and Soundariya were directly nominated by Jacquline and Raanav using their Direct nomination power from Week 5 for the Week 6 eviction process.
Week 6	Nominations	Jacquline, Jeffry, Manjari, Raanav, Ranjith, Riya, Sachana, Sathya, Tharshika, and Varshini were nominated in the presence of all housemates for the Week 6 eviction process.
Week 6	Tasks	Shopping task (Color, Color, What color do you choose?): This task is held in the garden area and is based primarily on memory power and slightly on luck. Three members from each team will participate. In the garden area, twelve bottles filled with various colors of water are kept inside and outside of a box on a table. Only the judge will know the colors of all the water bottles in the box ahead of time. The players must assemble the outside bottles to match the colors of the inside bottles based on their instincts. If the first player manages to match one of the bottles from both sides correctly, they will be given a chance to match another bottle; otherwise, the next player will step in to do the same. The judge must inform the players if they correctly matched the bottles on each turn. This task adheres to a relay system. This task will be completed after all of the bottles are correctly matched. The amount of BB currency collected by both teams from this task will determine their shopping budget for this week. Team Boys: Deepak, Muthukumaran and Raanav; Team Girls: Tharshika, Manjari and Sachana; Judge: Jeffry
Week 6	Tasks	Team Girls (collected 8000 BB currency)
Week 6	Tasks	Team Boys (collected 4000 BB currency)
Week 6	Tasks	House chores task (Handle with care): Three members from each team will participate in this task. In the garden area, there are two wobbly platforms with baskets attached to all four corners, each with a handle. Team Boys will use blue balls while red balls are for Team Girls. The players must take a ball, set it on the handle's starting point, and steer it into one of the platform's four baskets while simultaneously keeping the platform balanced. One player will play at a time per turn. The baskets on the front side are worth two points per ball, while the baskets on the back side are for five. If any player accidentally drops the existing balls on the basket, points will be deducted accordingly. The team with the most points when the final buzzer sounds will win this task. Team Boys: Jeffry, Shiva and Vishal; Team Girls: Manjari, Pavithra and Rayan; Supervisor: Arun
Week 6	Tasks	Winner: Team Girls (obtained 35 points)
Week 6	Tasks	Lost: Team Boys (obtained 32 points)
Week 6	Tasks	Weekly task (Bigg Boss Residential School): Bigg Boss House is recreated as a residential school, with the housemates playing characters from a typical school. Only school management employees can make food, while the remaining housemates will act as students. The rules implemented during this task may override some of Bigg Boss's default existing rules. Bigg Boss Residential School: Housemate / Role played; Varshini / Principal; Arun / Vice Principal; Jacquline / Moral science teacher; Manjari / Tamil teacher; Jeffry / PT teacher/Warden; Shiva / Watchman; Raanav / Last bench student; Sathya / Arrogant student; Sachana / Nerd student; Pavithra / Rich, High, and Mighty student; Riya / Cynic and Gossip student; Ananthi / Kleptomaniac Student; Muthukumaran / Teacher's Pet and Troublemaking student; Deepak / Informant student; Anshida, Ranjith, Rayan, Soundariya, Tharshika, Vishal / Classmates
Week 6	Tasks	Ranking task: Every teacher and school management staff member must rank all students from 1 to 14 based on their behavior in the Bigg Boss Residential School task, with 1 to 3 being the best and 12 to 14 being the worst. They must also provide a valid reason for their ranking.: Rank / Students; 1 / Muthukumaran; 2 / Sachana; 3 / Rayan; 4 / Ananthi; 5 / Ranjith; 6 / Anshida; 7 / Vishal; 8 / Pavithra; 9 / Soundariya; 10 / Deepak; 11 / Tharshika; 12 / Riya; 13 / Sathya; 14 / Raanav
Week 6	Tasks	Goibibo's Dart your way to your dream destination task (Round 1): This task will be performed by the housemates who were the best performers and received a Goibibo stamp in their passport from weeks 2 to 6. A Goibibo dartboard and a Goibibo magnetic board are kept in the activity area, along with the names of nine dream destinations: "Baku," "Bali," "Dubai," "Goa," "Jaipur," "Lonavala," "Manali," "Shillong," and "Thailand." Three chances will be provided to each housemate. They must aim their darts at the names of their preferred locations on the dartboard. The housemates' face images will be attached to the magnetic board, along with their chosen locations. The top three places chosen from this task will be confirmed for Goibibo's all-expenses-paid trip to the dream destination at the end of the season.
Week 6	Tasks	Morning activity task: This task is held in the living area.: Day 38 - Teacher assessment: All students must submit feedback to the teachers and school management staff so that they can improve themselves and correct their mistakes.; Day 39 - Apology letter: All students must write an apologetic letter to their teachers on behalf of another student, emphasizing their mistakes and the justice required for others. They must include information about both the person who made the mistake and the person who was impacted by it. The letters submitted will be corrected by the Tamil teacher.
Week 6	Tasks	Weekly nomination free pass tasks: There are three levels to this task: 1) Level 1 - Teamwork task (Chinna kutchi betha ball): This round will test the housemates' teamwork. This task is held in the garden area. Five members from each team will participate in this task. Two net basket cages with woven wire holes, as well as little sticks, are kept in the garden area. The players must use those sticks to guide the balls from the bottom to the top portion of the cage. The team that manages to release the most balls from the baskets when the final buzzer sounds will win this task. Team Boys: Deepak, Muthukumaran, Raanav, Sathya and Vishal; Team Girls: Pavithra, Rayan, Riya, Sachana and Soundariya; Supervisor: Arun
Week 6	Tasks	Winner: Team Girls
Week 6	Tasks	Lost: Team Boys
Week 6	Tasks	2) Level 2 - Intelligence task (Oru Oorla): This round will test the housemates' intelligence. This task is held in the activity area. Two members from each team will participate in this task. Each team will be handed three stories in the form of separate cards, which will be placed on opposing ends of a board. Each story will be broken into ten sentences, for a total of thirty sentences throughout the three stories. Both teams must arrange the cards in the appropriate order for each story. The team that obtains the most points after pressing the buzzer will win this task. Supervisor: Deepak: Team / Participants / Points obtained in Story 1 / Points obtained in Story 2 / Points obtained in Story 3 / Total points obtained; Boys / Arun / 6 / 10 / 3 / 19; Boys / Muthukumaran / 6 / 10 / 3 / 19; Girls / Ananthi / 1 / 6 / 8 / 15; Girls / Jacquline / 1 / 6 / 8 / 15
Week 6	Tasks	Winner: Team Boys (obtained 19/30 points)
Week 6	Tasks	Lost: Team Girls (obtained 15/30 points)
Week 6	Tasks	3) Level 3 - Skill task (Flip the bottle): This round will test the housemates' skills. This task is held in the activity area. Five members from each team will participate in this task. Three tables will be present in the activity area, with two of them containing a plastic water bottle with a small amount of water and the third containing a jar of kabasura kudineer/paavakai juice as well as several tiny glasses to drink it from. One player will play at a time per turn. The players must flip the bottle and ensure that it lands properly on the table. If a player fails to do so, they must drink a glass of the above-mentioned juice before proceeding to play again. This task adheres to a relay system. The first team to correctly flip the bottle will win this task. Team Boys before swap: Deepak, Jeffry, Sathya, Shiva, and Vishal; Team Boys after swap: Deepak, Jeffry, Muthukumaran, Sathya, and Vishal; Team Girls before swap: Manjari, Pavithra, Rayan, Sachana and Tharshika; Team Girls after swap: Manjari, Rayan, Riya, Sachana and Soundariya; Supervisor: Jacquline
Week 6	Tasks	Winner: Team Boys
Week 6	Tasks	Lost: Team Girls
Week 6	Sponsored	—N/a
Week 6	Punishments	When the Bigg Boss dog barks or an announcement is made to wear the mic correctly, house captain Arun must give a punishment of his choice to one of the housemates on behalf of the one who made the mistake.; Team Boys will need to do a whole week of house chores after losing the House chores task.; The students who were ranked as the worst behaved in the Bigg Boss Residential School task must write an imposition letter and submit it to their teachers.; Raanav and Varshini were voted the least productive housemates, and Bigg Boss punished them by serving food, tea, coffee, and water to other housemates whenever they requested it until the next Bigg Boss announcement.
Week 6	Exits	On Day 42, Riya Thiyagarajan was evicted after facing public votes.
Week 7	Twists	House swap: On Day 42, Team Boys were relocated to the left portion of the house, while Team Girls were relocated to the right. Captain's green badges: The house captain for Week 7 (Manjari) must keep three of the assigned captain's green badges. Whenever the Bigg Boss dog barks or Bigg Boss makes an announcement about wearing the mic correctly, the house captain must administer a punishment of her choice to one of the housemates on behalf of the one who made the mistake. Any housemate may take away one of the badges from the captain at any time throughout the week if they believe the captain is careless, is not properly leading the house, or is biased. They must give valid reasons to the other housemates in the living area. If all three badges are taken away before the end of the week, they will lose their position as captain. Captaincy status: The house captain (Manjari) had two badges at the end of Week 7. Opposite nomination process: The nominations for the Week 7 eviction process will be based on each team member nominating members from the opposing team. Contestant swap and direct nomination power: On Day 43, one member from each team, Sathya and Ananthi, were switched to the opposing teams. Bigg Boss entitled them to directly nominate a contestant for the eviction process. Weekly nomination free pass: Both teams could earn the Nomination free pass and award it to one of their teammates, granting them immunity from the Week 7 eviction process, by winning 2 of 3 tasks testing their skill and knowledge. On Day 45, Team Boys won most of the tasks and awarded the pass to Shiva. Goibibo passport stamp: Deepak and Pavithra were chosen as the best performers by their respective teams based on their overall performance during Week 7.
Week 7	Captaincy Task	Thalaivana Thalaiviaa (Lemon in the Spoon): Manjari and Vishal were chosen as the contenders for this task during Week 6 after being determined to be the best performers by their respective teams. A bowl of lemons and two spoons will be kept in the garden area. The contenders must hold a spoon in their mouth, place a lemon on it, and then keep their hands behind their backs. They must continue walking without pausing in the garden area. The contender who maintains their balance before the other's lemon falls will win the captaincy task and become the house captain for Week 7. Supervisor: Arun
Week 7	Captaincy Task	Winner: Manjari
Week 7	Captaincy Task	Lost: Vishal
Week 7	House Captain	Manjari
Week 7	Nominations	Muthukumaran and Varshini were directly nominated by Anshida and Rayan using their Direct nomination power from Week 6 for the Week 7 eviction process.
Week 7	Nominations	Ananthi, Arun, Jacquline, Pavithra, Raanav, Rayan, Sachana, Shiva, Soundariya, Tharshika, and Vishal were nominated for the Week 7 eviction process.
Week 7	Tasks	Shopping task (Onnu inga irukku inonu enga?): Some bananas are kept on six pedestals in the garden area. Six chairs are positioned opposite the pedestals. This task will involve six people from each team, who will be blindfolded. Three of those six members will stand near the pedestals, with the remaining three sitting on the chairs. Both teams will play simultaneously. No two players from the same team will sit next to each other. The players adjacent to the pedestals must take one banana at a time, keep one hand behind their back, and walk to the other side to feed their teammates. If they feed their teammates, their team will receive 1000 BB currency for each banana. If they feed the opposing players, the opposing team will receive 1000 BB currency instead. This task adheres to a relay system. All players are prohibited from guessing other players by touch and must remain quiet throughout the task. The amount of BB currency collected by both teams from this task will determine their shopping budget for this week. Team Boys: Arun, Deepak, Jeffry, Muthukumaran, Shiva and Vishal; Team Girls: Anshida, Jacquline, Sathya, Soundariya, Tharshika and Varshini; Supervisor: Manjari
Week 7	Tasks	Team Girls (collected 11000 BB currency)
Week 7	Tasks	Team Boys (collected 9000 BB currency)
Week 7	Tasks	Weekly task - Bigg Boss Darbar (Arima Desam kingdom vs Komagal Kottai kingdom): Housemates will be separated into two kingdoms: the Arima Desam Kingdom and the Komagal Kottai kingdom. Furthermore, housemates from each kingdom will be grouped into three categories: Royal family, Workers and Cooks, and Commoners. A region's king and queen have disputes and hence run two kingdoms separately. Housemates from both kingdoms must discreetly choose a spy from the commoners of the other kingdom and reveal it to the chosen housemates. The chosen housemates must not oppose the choice of both kingdoms. The kingdom that successfully conquers the other kingdom will ascend to the throne of both kingdoms this week. Spy from Arima desam's kingdom: Shiva; Spy from Komagal Kottai's kingdom: Jacquline: Kingdoms / Categories / Role / Housemate; Arima Desam kingdom / Royal Family / King / Raanav; Arima Desam kingdom / Royal Family / Raja Guru / Rayan; Arima Desam kingdom / Royal Family / Commander / Deepak; Arima Desam kingdom / Workers and Cooks / Worker / Jeffry; Arima Desam kingdom / Workers and Cooks / Cook / Vishal; Arima Desam kingdom / Commoners / Common people / Muthukumaran; Arima Desam kingdom / Commoners / Common people / Ananthi; Arima Desam kingdom / Commoners / Common people / Shiva; Arima Desam kingdom / Commoners / Common people / Ranjith; Arima Desam kingdom / Commoners / Common people / Arun; Komagal Kottai kingdom / Royal Family / Queen / Sachana; Komagal Kottai kingdom / Royal Family / Raja Guru / Pavithra; Komagal Kottai kingdom / Royal Family / Commander / Manjari; Komagal Kottai kingdom / Workers and Cooks / Worker / Soundariya; Komagal Kottai kingdom / Workers and Cooks / Cook / Tharshika; Komagal Kottai kingdom / Commoners / Common people / Anshida; Komagal Kottai kingdom / Commoners / Common people / Sathya; Komagal Kottai kingdom / Commoners / Common people / Varshini; Komagal Kottai kingdom / Commoners / Common people / Jacquline; Conquer the steps to ascend the throne challenges: Task 1 - (Weekly Nomination free pass): The kingdom that wins the Weekly Nomination free pass will win this task.; Task 2 - (Objects with clay): This task is held in the garden area. The commoners from each kingdom must create a variety of objects from the allotted clay. The kingdom that obtains the most overall points for its objects will win this task.; Points obtained by Arima Desam kingdom: 3130; Points obtained by Komagal Kottai kingdom: 2900; Supervisors for the task: Deepak and Manjari; Task 3 - (Guess the time): The Raja Gurus from each kingdom must accurately predict the time of day at 1 pm, 3 pm, 6 pm, and 9 pm before a camera. The kingdom with the most correct estimates will win this task.; Task 4 - (Guess the weight of objects): This task is held in the activity area. The commoners from each kingdom must guess the weight of a variety of objects, fruits, and vegetables. The kingdom with the closest to Bigg Boss's weight evaluations will win this task.; Task 5: This task was canceled since the Arima Desam kingdom had already conquered three of the five steps in the Conquer the steps to ascend the throne challenges.; Task / Arima Desam / vs / Komagal kottai / Winner; 1 / Arun, Deepak, Raanav, Ranjith, Rayan, Shiva / vs / Jacquline, Manjari, Pavithra, Sachana, Tharshika, Varshini / Arima desam; 2 / Ananthi, Arun, Muthukumaran, Shiva / vs / Anshida, Jacquline, Sathya, Varshini / Arima desam; 3 / Rayan / vs / Pavithra / Komagal kottai; 4 / Ananthi, Arun, Muthukumaran, Ranjith / vs / Anshida, Jacquline, Sathya, Varshini / Arima desam; 5 / —N/a / vs / —N/a / —N/a; Result: The Arima Desam kingdom conquered three of the five steps in the Conquer the steps to ascend the throne challenges and King Raanav ascended to the throne of both kingdoms.
Week 7	Tasks	Winner: Arima desam
Week 7	Tasks	Lost: Komagal kottai
Week 7	Tasks	Morning activity task: This task is held in the living area.: Day 44 - Housemates' Game Progression: Every housemate must tell their peers of their efforts and what they have done to entertain the audience and elevate themselves.; Day 47 - Identify the housemates' gameplay: Each housemate must select three other housemates and determine which plays an individual game, which plays a team game, and which contributes little to the game.
Week 7	Tasks	Weekly nomination free pass tasks: There are three levels to this task: 1) Level 1 - Skill task (Suzhal Pandhu): This round will test the housemates' skills. This task is held in the activity area. Five members from each team will participate in this task. In the activity area, tables along with some cups and a bowl containing marbles are kept for both teams. The players must invert a cup onto the marble, spin it completely, creating a vortex effect, and place it in the bowls on the pedestals opposite the tables. This task adheres to a relay system. If completing this task takes too long, players from both teams can trade turns with their teammates. The team that places the most marbles into the bowl will win this task. Team Boys: Arun, Deepak, Raanav, Ranjith and Rayan; Team Girls: Jacquline, Manjari, Pavithra, Sachana and Tharshika; Supervisor: Muthukumaran
Week 7	Tasks	Winner: Team Boys (placed 5 marbles in the bowl)
Week 7	Tasks	Lost: Team Girls (placed 4 marbles in the bowl)
Week 7	Tasks	2) Level 2 - Knowledge task (Mapu vechitanda aapu): This round will test the housemates' knowledge. This task is held in the activity area. Two members from each team will participate in this task. In the activity area, two world maps are kept on two boards opposite each other, along with some magnetic markers and labels with the names of twenty countries. Players from both teams must place the markers on the correct countries and the labels right below them. The team that correctly tags the most countries on the map will win this task. Supervisor for Team Boys: Ananthi; Supervisor for Team Girls: Soundariya: Team / Participants / Total countries located correctly; Boys / Deepak / 17; Boys / Shiva / 17; Girls / Manjari / 11; Girls / Varshini / 11
Week 7	Tasks	Winner: Team Boys (located 17/20 countries correctly)
Week 7	Tasks	Lost: Team Girls (located 11/20 countries correctly)
Week 7	Tasks	3) Level 3: This task was canceled since the boys' team had already won the first two Nomination free pass tasks.
Week 7	Tasks	Task Cancelled
Week 7	Sponsored	Atomberg's Boat Race: Wind and Light Intensity: This task is held in the garden area. In the task, Team Boys will be known as Team Atom and Team Girls as Team Berg. Nine members from each team will participate in this task. The garden area contains two water pools, various papers, two pedestal fans, two ceiling fans, and two flags indicating the starting point and finishing point for each team. The first and second players must make paper boats and place them in the water pool. Every time a boat reaches the finishing flag after a round, the third player must use the remote control to adjust the light intensity of the Atomberg ceiling fan, which ranges from levels one to five. The first three players on each squad must only perform the aforementioned roles and remain in their marked positions. The remaining five of the six players must make use of the wind from the Atomberg pedestal fan to guide the boat from the starting flag to the finishing flag. This task adheres to a relay system. The team that manages to get the light intensity of the ceiling fan to level five and win the boat race will win this task. The final player from each team must use the remote control to switch on the Atomberg ceiling fan and remark, "Atomberg, why not?" Team Atom: Ananthi, Arun, Deepak, Muthukumaran, Raanav, Ranjith, Rayan, Shiva, Vishal; Team Berg: Anshida, Jacquline, Manjari, Pavithra, Sachana, Sathya, Soundariya, Tharshika, Varshini; Judge: Jeffry; Atomberg's Boat Race: Wind and Light Intensity Winner: Team Atom
Week 7	Punishments	When the Bigg Boss dog barks or an announcement is made to wear the mic correctly, house captain Manjari must give a punishment of her choice to one of the housemates on behalf of the one who made the mistake.; Shiva and Soundariya were voted the least productive housemates, and Bigg Boss punished them by making them listen to a roast session by other housemates in which they received unfiltered and objective feedback without interjection.
Week 7	Exits	On Day 49, Varshini Venkat was evicted from the Bigg Boss house after facing public votes.
Week 8	Twists	Boys vs Girls theme concluded: On Day 50, Bigg Boss announced the end of the Boys vs Girls theme team-based phase of the competition and the beginning of the individual-based phase and everyone was allowed access to all parts of the house. Captain's flowerpot: The house captain for Week 8 (Deepak) must keep the assigned captain's flowerpot filled with five flowers in the living area. Whenever the Bigg Boss dog barks or Bigg Boss makes an announcement about wearing the mic correctly, the house captain must administer a punishment of his choice to one of the housemates on behalf of the one who made the mistake. Any housemate may take away one of the flowers from the captain at any time throughout the week if they believe the captain is not entertaining, is not properly leading the house, or is biased. They must give valid reasons to the other housemates in the living area. If all five flowers are taken away before the end of the week, they will lose their position as captain. Captaincy Status: The house captain (Deepak) had three flowers at the end of Week 8. Closed nomination process: The nominations for the Week 8 eviction process will be based on each contestant choosing two of the other housemates' photos, painting a cross on them with the given paint, and crushing and tossing them outside the house's main door. Nomination free pass: On Day 54, Jeffry won the Neeyum bommai Naanum bommai task and was granted immunity from Week 9's eviction process. Goibibo passport stamp: Jeffry and Sachana were chosen as the best performers by their housemates in the house based on their overall performance during Week 8.
Week 8	Captaincy Task	Thalaivana Thalaiviaa: Deepak and Pavithra were chosen as the contenders for this task during Week 7 after being determined to be the best performers by their respective teams. This task is held in the garden area. In the garden area, two balls and two inclined slopes are kept for each contender. The contenders must balance the balls on both sides by standing between the slopes and rolling them up on each slope in turn, ensuring they don't fall. Each contender will have three chances. The contender who does not lose all three chances before the other will win the captaincy task and become the house captain for Week 8. Supervisor: Manjari
Week 8	Captaincy Task	Winner: Deepak
Week 8	Captaincy Task	Lost: Pavithra
Week 8	House Captain	Deepak
Week 8	Nominations	Jacquline and Ranjith were directly nominated by Sathya and Ananthi using their Direct nomination power from Week 7 for the Week 8 eviction process.
Week 8	Nominations	Ananthi, Anshida, Manjari, Rayan, Sachana, Sathya, Shiva, and Vishal were nominated for the Week 8 eviction process.
Week 8	Tasks	Ranking task: The boys must rank all of the girls from 1 to 8, based on how trustworthy they believe they have been throughout weeks 1 to 7.: Rank / Contestants; 1 / Anshida; 2 / Pavithra; 3 / Tharshika; 4 / Sachana; 5 / Ananthi; 6 / Jacquline; 7 / Soundariya; 8 / Manjari
Week 8	Tasks	Shopping task (Half-Boil): Every housemate will be provided with an egg. All of them must cook a perfect half-boil in the kitchen and serve it on a plate. If the egg yolk in the half-boil breaks for any of them, their plates will be disregarded. Every perfect half-boil is worth 500 points. The amount of points collected from this task by all housemates will determine their shopping budget for this week. Supervisor: Deepak
Week 8	Tasks	Total points obtained: 8500
Week 8	Tasks	Weekly task - Bigg Boss Doll task (Neeyum bommai Naanum bommai): Eighteen dolls labeled with the names of eighteen housemates are kept on a specific object, and a dollhouse with seventeen slots is placed next to the house's main door in the garden area. When the buzzer sounds, each housemate must take a doll from that object and place it in any one of those slots. Housemates are not allowed to take a doll with their name on it. They may exchange the doll they have with another, provided they abide by the exchange conditions mentioned in the specific set of rounds. The housemates who advance to the subsequent rounds must return their dolls before the next round begins. The housemate whose doll fails to enter the dollhouse at the end of each round will be eliminated from this task. After a housemate is eliminated, the other housemate must throw that housemate's doll in the given dustbin and close one of the slots using the boards marked with an X sign. The number of slots will decrease with each round. The housemate whose doll is placed into the dollhouse at the end of the final round will win this task and will be saved from Week 9's eviction process.: Rules, specific objects and exchange conditions: Rounds (1–3): The housemates' dolls are kept in a ball pit filled with balls of different colours. The housemates can only exchange the dolls with each other in the ball pit.; Rounds (4–6): The housemates' dolls are kept on a doll stand. The housemates can exchange the dolls anywhere in the garden area before entering the dollhouse. They can even take a doll away from other housemates, preventing it from entering the dollhouse.; Rounds (7–8): The housemates' dolls are kept in a ball pit filled with balls of different colours. The housemates can only exchange the dolls in the ball pit.; Rounds (9–14): The eliminated housemates can prevent those who remain in this task from keeping the dolls in the dollhouse. They are not allowed to take or exchange the dolls, nor can they enter the dollhouse. The rules mentioned in Rounds (7–8) are also applicable.; Round 15: House captain Deepak must hide the dolls inside the ball pit. The rules mentioned in Rounds (7–8) and Rounds (9–14) are also applicable.; Final round: The two remaining housemates must each select one eliminated housemate to play in the final round of this task on their behalf. The rules mentioned in Rounds (7–8), Rounds (9–14), and Round 15 are also applicable.; Bigg Boss Doll task: Housemates / Final position; Jeffry / Winner; Shiva / Eliminated in Round 16; Sachana / Eliminated in Round 15; Arun / Eliminated in Round 14; Pavithra / Eliminated in Round 13; Manjari / Eliminated in Round 12; Ananthi / Eliminated in Round 11; Ranjith / Eliminated in Round 10; Rayan / Eliminated in Round 9; Sathya / Eliminated in Round 8; Jacquline and Vishal / Eliminated in Round 7; Muthukumaran / Eliminated in Round 6; Anshida / Eliminated in Round 5; Tharshika / Eliminated in Round 4; Deepak / Eliminated in Round 3; Raanav / Eliminated in Round 2; Soundariya / Eliminated in Round 1; Notes: Jacquline and Vishal were eliminated in the seventh round because their dolls did not make it inside the dollhouse within the time limit set by Bigg Boss.; Rayan and Arun have been chosen by Jeffry and Shiva to play on their behalf in the final round.; Result: Since Jeffry won this task, he received the Nomination free pass and was saved from Week 9's eviction process.
Week 8	Tasks	Winner: Jeffry
Week 8	Tasks	Lost: Remaining housemates
Week 8	Tasks	Morning activity task: This task is held in the living area.: Day 52 - Analyzing housemates' personalities (Expectations vs Reality): Each housemate must choose a peer and describe how their perception of their personality changed from when they first entered the house to now.; Day 53 - Identifying the puppet master and the puppet: Each housemate must choose one person whom they believe is directing the other housemates as a puppet master, as well as one person whom they believe is acting as a puppet for others.
Week 8	Tasks	Chit task: A bowl full of chits is kept in the living area. Every chit contains two statements written on it. Each housemate must select a chit from the bowl and explain why it applies to two housemates of their choice.
Week 8	Tasks	Grab Parachute Grab task: A parachute is kept in the middle of the garden area with a circle drawn around it. Housemates must divide into two teams of six and stand in zones specified by red and yellow border lines, respectively. The guests (Shakthi and Iyal) will be on opposite teams. When the buzzer sounds, one player from each side must approach the parachute and carry it to their respective zones before being tagged by a player from the opposite team. If they succeed, they will receive a point; otherwise, the other team will receive a point. There are six rounds in total. The team that obtains the most points at the end of the sixth round will win this task. Team Shakthi: Shakthi, Jeffry, Raanav, Ranjith, Sachana, and Sathya; Team Iyal: Iyal, Arun, Anshida, Jacquline, Soundariya and Tharshika; Winner: Team Iyal
Week 8	Sponsored	CERA's Collections: In the activity area, three of CERA's Lustre Sanitaryware units, the French Gold Collection, the Rose Gold Collection, and the Platinum Collection, are kept. Housemates must divide themselves into three teams of five members each to promote those units. Three members will serve as judges for this task. They will select the winning team based on the creativity demonstrated in this task.: Round 1 (Style Style Thaan): Three members from each team will perform in this round. Some of CERA's songs will be played. Housemates from each of the three teams must entertain, perform, and promote the aforementioned three units by making them the center of attention.; Round 2 (CERA Punches: Pera Kettale Chumma Athiruthilla): Two members from each team will perform in this round. Housemates from each of the three teams must perform and promote the aforementioned three units, making them the center of attention by imitating some of the iconic dialogues from Tamil cinema.; Team French Gold Collection: Ananthi, Anshida, Manjari, Pavithra, and Tharshika; Team Rose Gold Collection: Jacquline, Muthukumaran, Rayan, Shiva, and Soundariya; Team Platinum Collection: Arun, Raanav, Sachana, Sathya and Vishal; Judges: Deepak, Jeffry and Ranjith; CERA's Collections Winner: Team Platinum collection
Week 8	Punishments	When the Bigg Boss dog barks or an announcement is made to wear the mic correctly, house captain Deepak must give a punishment of his choice to one of the housemates on behalf of the one who made the mistake.; Manjari and Raanav were voted the least productive housemates. Bigg Boss punished them by turning them into dolls, making them dependent on other housemates to carry out their basic requirements until the next Bigg Boss announcement.
Week 8	Exits	On Day 56, Shiva Kumar was evicted after facing public votes.
Week 9	Twists	Captain's portrait: The house captain for Week 9 (Jeffry) must keep the assigned captain's portrait divided into three pieces in the living area. Whenever the Bigg Boss dog barks or Bigg Boss makes an announcement about wearing the mic correctly, the house captain must administer a punishment of his choice to one of the housemates on behalf of the one who makes the mistake. Any housemate may take away one of the portrait's pieces from the captain at any time throughout the week if they believe the captain is not entertaining, is not properly leading the house, or is biased. They must give valid reasons to the other housemates in the living area. If all three portrait pieces are taken away before the end of the week, they will lose their position as captain. Captaincy status: The house captain (Jeffry) still had all three portrait pieces at the end of Week 9. Captain's Assistant: When viewers were asked if an assistant captain should be chosen to assist Week 9's house captain in an audience poll, the majority said they should be chosen by their housemates. Sachana was chosen by all the housemates and became the assistant captain for Week 9. Open nomination process: The nomination process for the Week 9 eviction will be based on each contestant nominating two other housemates, with them standing opposite each other on their platforms and the contestant who nominated them explaining their reasoning in the presence of all housemates. Nomination free pass: On Day 60, Manjari won the Angels vs Devils task and was granted immunity from Week 10's eviction process. Goibibo passport stamp: Deepak, Manjari, Pavithra, and Ranjith were chosen as the best performers by their housemates in the house based on their overall performance during Week 9.
Week 9	Captaincy Task	Thalaivana Thalaiviaa: Jeffry and Sachana were chosen as the contenders for this task during Week 8 after being voted the best performers by their housemates. This task is held in the activity area. Sixty number plates are scattered throughout the activity area, and a plasma television will display a random number plate. There are ten rounds in total. In each round, the contenders must find the number plate shown on the television. The contender who finds the most number plates will win the captaincy task and become the house captain for Week 9. In the event of a tie, Bigg Boss will orally convey a random number plate to both contenders twice, following which they must find it to win this week's captaincy task. Supervisor: Deepak
Week 9	Captaincy Task	Winner: Jeffry
Week 9	Captaincy Task	Lost: Sachana
Week 9	House Captain	Jeffry
Week 9	Nominations	Ananthi, Jacquline, Manjari, Muthukumaran, Pavithra, Raanav, Ranjith, Rayan, Sachana, Sathya, Soundariya, and Tharshika were nominated in the presence of all housemates for the Week 9 eviction process.
Week 9	Tasks	Shopping task (Podu Attam Podu): In the activity area, a dance floor is set, and a pedestal with a headphone is kept near it. Each housemate must wear headphones, listen to the song, and communicate it to the other housemates by dancing on the floor at the same time, after which the other housemates must correctly guess the song's name. Each song guessed correctly is worth 500 points. The amount of points obtained will determine the week's shopping budget. Supervisor: Jeffry
Week 9	Tasks	Total points obtained: 6500
Week 9	Tasks	Ranking task 1: Housemates must discuss among themselves and rank any eight other housemates from 1 to 8 based on whom they believe meets any of the following criteria: A housemate who has not been the cause of many problems.; A housemate who has not exaggerated or interfered in conflicts with other housemates.; A housemate who has pretended to be kind to others while not revealing their true personality to the other housemates.; The chosen housemates will play the role of Angels in the weekly task: Angels vs Devils.: Rank / Contestants; 1 / Ranjith; 2 / Anshida; 3 / Sathya; 4 / Ananthi; 5 / Vishal; 6 / Pavithra; 7 / Rayan; 8 / Jeffry
Week 9	Tasks	Ranking task 2: The housemates who were chosen as Angels in Ranking task 1 must rank the other housemates as Devils from 1 to 9 based on the wicked traits they have witnessed so far on the Bigg Boss show and explain their reasons for doing so in the living area. The chosen housemates from Ranking task 1 and Ranking task 2 will play the role of Angels and Devils in the weekly task: Angels vs Devils.: Rank / Contestants; 1 / Manjari; 2 / Jacquline; 3 / Muthukumaran; 4 / Deepak; 5 / Soundariya; 6 / Sachana; 7 / Arun; 8 / Tharshika; 9 / Raanav
Week 9	Tasks	Weekly task (Angels vs Devils): In this task, housemates were divided into two groups: 8 Angels from Ranking task 1, who will live in Heaven, and 9 Devils from Ranking task 2, who will live in Hell. The devils must try to break the angels' composure, while the angels must remain calm and composed in this task.: Levels / Angels / vs / Devils; 1 / Ranjith / vs / Manjari; 1 / Anshida / vs / Jacquline; 1 / Sathya / vs / Muthukumaran; 1 / Ananthi / vs / Deepak; 1 / Vishal / vs / Soundariya; 1 / Pavithra / vs / Sachana; 1 / Rayan / vs / Arun; 1 / Jeffry / vs / Tharshika; 1 / NA / vs / Raanav; 2 / Manjari / vs / Ranjith; 2 / Jacquline / vs / Anshida; 2 / Muthukumaran / vs / Sathya; 2 / Deepak / vs / Ananthi; 2 / Soundariya / vs / Vishal; 2 / Sachana / vs / Pavithra; 2 / Arun / vs / Rayan; 2 / Tharshika / vs / Jeffry; 2 / Raanav / vs / NA; Angel's world: In this world, the angels must remain calm and composed.; They must meet and overcome their challenges with a smile and kindness, as well as retain their composure in the face of the devils.; They must perform all the housework.; They must wear the three heart badges assigned to them and remain calm and composed at all times; if they fail, they must give away one of their hearts to the devil who managed to break their composure.; Levels / Angels / No. of heart badges remaining / Given to; 1 / Ranjith / 3 / None; 1 / Rayan / 3 / None; 1 / Vishal / 3 / None; 1 / Ananthi / 2 / Sachana; 1 / Anshida / 0 / Deepak, Manjari, Tharshika; 1 / Jeffry / 0 / Deepak, Muthukumaran x2; 1 / Pavithra / 0 / Deepak, Manjari, Sachana; 1 / Sathya / 0 / Manjari, Muthukumaran, Raanav; 2 / Arun / 2 / Vishal; 2 / Manjari / 0 / Jeffry, Sathya, Vishal; 2 / Jacquline / 0 / Jeffry, Ranjith x2; 2 / Muthukumaran / 0 / Pavithra, Ranjith, Vishal; 2 / Deepak / 0 / Jeffry, Pavithra, Vishal; 2 / Sachana / 0 / Ananthi, Jeffry, Sathya; 2 / Soundariya / 0 / Ananthi, Jeffry, Vishal; 2 / Tharshika / 0 / Ananthi, Pavithra, Sathya; 2 / Raanav / 0 / Rayan, Vishal x2; Devil's world: In this world, the devils must not exhibit any attributes demonstrating kindness, such as fear, compassion, concern, or pleading, to the angels.; They must show their qualities, such as imitation, jest, tease, wrath, hatred, power, envy, vengeance, and monstrosity, to the angels.; They must refrain from doing any housework.; They must attempt to break the angels' composure by making them lose patience or show their emotions; if they succeed, they will be able to collect one of their heart badges.; At the end of the task, they must convene a meeting to select a devil they believe was least productive, after which they will be imprisoned in a jail until the next Bigg Boss announcement.; The devil that collects the most heart badges from the angels will earn a Nomination free pass and will be saved from Week 10's eviction process.; Levels / Devils / No. of heart badges collected / Obtained from; 1 / Deepak / 3 / Anshida, Jeffry, Pavithra; 1 / Manjari / 3 / Anshida, Pavithra, Sathya; 1 / Muthukumaran / 3 / Jeffry x2, Sathya; 1 / Sachana / 2 / Ananthi, Pavithra; 1 / Raanav / 1 / Sathya; 1 / Tharshika / 1 / Anshida; 1 / Arun / 0 / None; 1 / Jacquline / 0 / None; 1 / Soundariya / 0 / None; 2 / Vishal / 7 / Arun, Deepak, Manjari, Muthukumaran, Raanav x2, Soundariya; 2 / Jeffry / 5 / Deepak, Jacquline, Manjari, Sachana, Soundariya; 2 / Ananthi / 3 / Sachana, Soundariya, Tharshika; 2 / Ranjith / 3 / Jacquline x2, Muthukumaran; 2 / Pavithra / 3 / Deepak, Muthukumaran, Tharshika; 2 / Sathya / 3 / Manjari, Sachana, Tharshika; 2 / Rayan / 1 / Raanav; 2 / Anshida / 0 / None; Notes: The housemates who were Angels and Devils in Level 1 had their roles reversed in Level 2.; The winning criteria was changed to require that all devils with at least one heart badge vote for the best performer in this task. The chosen devil will receive a Nomination free pass and be saved from Week 10's eviction process.; Result: Since Manjari won this task, she received the Nomination free pass and was saved from Week 10's eviction process.
Week 9	Tasks	Winner: Manjari
Week 9	Tasks	Lost: Remaining housemates
Week 9	Tasks	Morning activity task: This task is held in the living area.: Day 58 - Identifying housemates' productivity: Each housemate must select three other housemates and determine who is a workaholic, who pretends to work, and who is idle in the Bigg Boss house.; Day 61 - Transcendent and Broken Friendships: Each housemate must select two other housemates with whom they will remain in contact and two housemates with whom they will not connect once the Bigg Boss season concludes.
Week 9	Sponsored	Bubbl Paint's Create a bubble paint catalogue: This task is held in the activity area. Housemates must divide themselves into two teams of seven members for this task. In the activity area, ten bubble paint buckets, five for interior and five for exterior, along with paint brushes, are kept for each team. Ten USP cue cards with paint's features are placed on top of another ten buckets on the floor. Two boards partitioned into ten boxes, five for interior and five for exterior, are also kept. When the buzzer sounds, players must stand in the marked zone and take the cue card by connecting the brush to the provided pipes. If an interior card is picked, the player must use an interior bubble paint bucket to paint the interior box on the board and vice versa. The first team to paint all ten boxes on the board and finish the bubble paint catalogue will win this task. Team Ulle: Ananthi, Anshida, Arun, Deepak, Muthukumaran, Raanav and Tharshika; Team Veliye: Jacquline, Jeffry, Manjari, Pavithra, Sachana, Soundariya and Vishal; Judges: Ranjith, Sathya; Bubbl Paint's Create a bubble paint catalogue Winner: Team Ulle
Week 9	Punishments	When the Bigg Boss dog barks or an announcement is made to wear the mic correctly, house captain Jeffry must give a punishment of his choice to one of the housemates on behalf of the one who made the mistake.; Jacquline and Rayan were voted the least productive devils in the Angels vs Devils task and were sent to the jail for Levels 1 and 2, respectively, until the next Bigg Boss announcement.; Jacquline and Soundariya were voted the least productive housemates, and Bigg Boss punished them by making them consume only the food he provided until the next Bigg Boss announcement.
Week 9	Exits	On Day 63, Sachana Namidass and RJ Ananthi were evicted after facing public votes in a double eviction twist.
Week 10	Twists	Captain's nest with eggs: The house captain for Week 10 (Ranjith) must keep the assigned captain's nest with three eggs in the living area. Whenever the Bigg Boss dog barks or Bigg Boss makes an announcement about wearing the mic correctly, the house captain must administer a punishment of his choice to one of the housemates on behalf of the one who makes the mistake. Any housemate may take away one of the eggs from the captain at any time throughout the week if they believe the captain is not entertaining, is not properly leading the house, or is biased. They must give valid reasons to the other housemates in the living area. If all three eggs are taken away before the end of the week, they will lose their position as captain. Captaincy status: The house captain (Ranjith) had two eggs in the nest at the end of Week 10. Closed nomination process: The nomination process for the Week 10 eviction will be based on each contestant nominating two other housemates, stating their reasons, and finally describing them in one word. Nomination free pass: On Day 68, Jeffry won the Managers vs Laborers task and was granted immunity from Week 11's eviction process. Goibibo passport stamp: Jacquline, Muthukumaran, and Vishal were chosen as the best performers by their housemates in the house based on their overall performance from Weeks 1 to 10.
Week 10	Captaincy Task	Thalaivana Thalaiviaa (Thannila Gandam): Deepak, Manjari, Pavithra, and Ranjith were chosen as the contenders for this task during Week 9 after being voted the best performers by their housemates. Each contender in the garden area has a water tank on their assigned table. The tank is filled with water and contains several holes that are sealed using hole sticks. When the buzzer sounds, players must defend their tanks while simultaneously attacking their opponents' tanks. They can attack their opponents' tanks by removing their sticks and blocking water leaks with their hands or entire bodies. The removed sticks should not be reused to seal the tank. When the final buzzer sounds, the contender with the most water in their water tank will win the captaincy task and become the house captain for Week 10. Supervisor: Jeffry
Week 10	Captaincy Task	Winner: Ranjith
Week 10	Captaincy Task	Lost: Deepak, Manjari and Pavithra
Week 10	House Captain	Ranjith
Week 10	Nominations	Anshida, Arun, Jacquline, Pavithra, Rayan, Sathya, Soundariya, Tharshika and Vishal were nominated for the Week 10 eviction process.
Week 10	Tasks	Shopping task: In the activity area, two magnetic boards, each with two holes on the bottom and a face drawn on the top, are kept. The facial features of a human face, such as the eyes, ears, nose, and mouth, will be placed on a tray in front of the board. The players will perform this task while blindfolded and standing on the back side of the board. When the buzzer sounds, players must pick the facial features from the tray by passing their hands through the two holes and place them in the proper spots on the face. Each face with its facial features positioned correctly is worth 500 points. The amount of points obtained will determine the week's shopping budget. Judge: Ranjith
Week 10	Tasks	Total points obtained: 3000
Week 10	Tasks	Top 8 Bottom 7 task: Housemates must discuss among themselves and select eight housemates for the Top 8 and the remaining seven for the Bottom 7. The chosen housemates from the Top 8 Bottom 7 task will play the role of Managers and Laborers in the weekly task: Managers vs Laborers.: Top 8 / Bottom 7 / Housemate; Top 8 / Deepak; Top 8 / Jacquline; Top 8 / Jeffry; Top 8 / Manjari; Top 8 / Muthukumaran; Top 8 / Soundariya; Top 8 / Tharshika; Top 8 / Vishal; Bottom 7 / Anshida; Bottom 7 / Arun; Bottom 7 / Pavithra; Bottom 7 / Raanav; Bottom 7 / Ranjith; Bottom 7 / Rayan; Bottom 7 / Sathya
Week 10	Tasks	Weekly task - Bigg Boss Factory (Managers vs Laborers): In this task, housemates were divided into two groups: 8 Managers and 7 Laborers from the Top 8 Bottom 7 task. Managers will live in the house and have access to all of its facilities. A factory has been set up in the garden area. The laborers must work in the factory and live in the designated dormitories. The house's essentials, such as drinking water, gas, and toilet water connections, have been disconnected. A manager must choose a laborer, and the chosen laborer must pedal the cycle allotted to that specific necessity each time it is required, after which the managers can utilize the house's facilities. The managers must give the laborers water and food, and they may only enter the house to use the toilet, which requires another laborer to pedal the cycle. The laborers must follow the rules set by the managers. The managers will live in the house, known as the Nomination Free Zone, while the laborers will live in the garden area, known as the Nominated Zone. Whenever the buzzer sounds, the managers must confer and send one manager to the Nominated Zone, while the laborers must confer and send one laborer to the Nomination Free Zone. At the end of this task, one of the managers will earn a nomination free pass, while one of the laborers will be directly nominated for Week 11's eviction process. Managers vs Laborers 2.0 (Day 67): In addition to the existing rules, laborers must now also do all the chores, such as cooking, vessel washing, etc. Water will no longer be provided through the house's pipes. A pipe will be provided in the garden area. To meet the house's needs, the laborers must fill buckets with water, hand them over to management, and pedal the appropriate cycle. The laborers must complete the task allotted by the managers inside the house, if any, and then return to their workplace. The managers have the authority to establish new rules and assign tasks to the laborers. Bigg Boss Factory: Day / Managers (Nomination Free Zone) / / vs / Laborers (Nominated Zone) / / Union representative; Day / Before swap / After swap / vs / Before swap / After swap / Union representative; 65 / Deepak / NA / vs / Anshida / NA / Anshida; 65 / Jacquline / NA / vs / Arun / NA / Anshida; 65 / Jeffry / NA / vs / Pavithra / NA / Anshida; 65 / Manjari / NA / vs / Raanav / NA / Anshida; 65 / Muthukumaran / NA / vs / Ranjith / NA / Anshida; 65 / Soundariya / NA / vs / Rayan / NA / Anshida; 65 / Tharshika / NA / vs / Sathya / NA / Anshida; 65 / Vishal / NA / vs / NA / NA / Anshida; 66 / Deepak / Arun / vs / Anshida / / Raanav; 66 / Jacquline / Deepak / vs / Arun / Muthukumaran / Raanav; 66 / Jeffry / Jacquline / vs / Pavithra / Raanav / Raanav; 66 / Manjari / Jeffry / vs / Raanav / Ranjith / Raanav; 66 / Muthukumaran / Manjari / vs / Ranjith / Rayan / Raanav; 66 / Soundariya / Pavithra / vs / Rayan / Sathya / Raanav; 66 / Tharshika / Soundariya / vs / Sathya / Vishal / Raanav; 66 / Vishal / Tharshika / vs / NA / / Raanav; 67 / Arun / / vs / Anshida / / Rayan; 67 / Deepak / / vs / Muthukumaran / Jacquline / Rayan; 67 / Jacquline / Jeffry / vs / Raanav / Muthukumaran / Rayan; 67 / Jeffry / Manjari / vs / Ranjith / Raanav / Rayan; 67 / Manjari / Pavithra / vs / Rayan / Ranjith / Rayan; 67 / Pavithra / Sathya / vs / Sathya / Rayan / Rayan; 67 / Soundariya / Tharshika / vs / Vishal / Soundariya / Rayan; 67 / Tharshika / NA / vs / NA / Vishal / Rayan; Notes: A manager must communicate the laborer's name and specify the essentials for which they will pedal the bicycle in front of a camera.; The laborers can express their grievances, benefits, or working conditions to the union representative at the union office.; Only the union representative must negotiate any labor disputes, working conditions, or complaints with the management.; If any of the key rules are broken, a laborer must continue to pedal the cycle until the next Bigg Boss announcement.; Result: Since Jeffry won this task, he received the Nomination free pass and was saved from Week 11's eviction process, while Raanav was directly nominated for Week 11's eviction process.
Week 10	Tasks	Winner: Jeffry
Week 10	Tasks	Lost: Remaining housemates
Week 10	Sponsored	Atomberg's Mixer Grinder Chammanthi Challenge: This task is held in the activity area. Housemates must divide themselves into two teams of six members for this task. Three members will serve as judges for this task. The aim of this task is to prepare a chammanthi using Atomberg's mixer grinder. In the activity area, ingredients for a chammanthi are kept inside various balloons on a table. Members of each team must take a balloon, place it on the given chair, then burst it by sitting on it. After collecting all of the ingredients, they must present them to the judges prior to the grinding process. Then they must make use of the ingredients and the mixer grinder to prepare a delicious chammanthi. The team that produces a chammanthi with the best presentation and flavor for the judges before the final buzzer sounds will win this task. Team Red: Anshida, Arun, Jeffry, Pavithra, Tharshika and Vishal; Team Green: Jacquline, Manjari, Muthukumaran, Raanav, Rayan and Soundariya; Judges: Deepak, Ranjith and Sathya; Atomberg's Mixer Grinder Chammanthi Challenge Winner: Team Red
Week 10	Sponsored	Himalaya's Face Wash Challenge: This task is held in the activity area. Housemates must divide themselves into two teams of six members for this task. Three members will serve as judges for this task. The activity area contains six different products of Himalaya's face wash: turmeric, lemon, aloe vera, charcoal, orange, and neem, along with the ingredients for each product. Housemates from each team must perform and promote these face wash products, making them the focus of an advertisement using the provided USP cue cards. The team that directs the advertisement and promotes the products in the most entertaining way will win this task. Team A: Anshida, Arun, Jeffry, Pavithra, Tharshika and Vishal; Team B: Muthukumaran, Raanav, Ranjith, Rayan, Sathya and Soundariya; Judges: Deepak, Jacquline, and Manjari; Himalaya's Face Wash Challenge Winner: Team B
Week 10	Punishments	When the Bigg Boss dog barks or an announcement is made to wear the mic correctly, house captain Ranjith must give a punishment of his choice to one of the housemates on behalf of the one who made the mistake.; All the housemates who were nominated for the Week 10 eviction process must wear the badge containing the two words the other housemates used to nominate them the entire week.; Jeffry was punished by Bigg Boss for breaking a major rule in the Managers vs Laborers task and was directed to choose a laborer of his choice to pedal the cycle allotted for restroom facilities until the next announcement.; Muthukumaran was punished by Bigg Boss for breaking a major rule in the Managers vs Laborers task, and he directed the managers to punish him as they saw fit.; Jacquline was sent by Bigg Boss from the Nomination Free Zone to the Nominated Zone for violating a crucial rule in the Managers vs Laborers task.
Week 10	Exits	On Days 69 & 70, Sathya SK and Tharshika were evicted after facing public votes in a double eviction twist.
Week 11	Entrances	On Day 72, Raanav re-entered the house after being discharged from the hospital.
Week 11	Twists	Captain's doll with knives: The house captain for Week 11 (Vishal) must keep the assigned captain's doll with three knives in the living area. Whenever the Bigg Boss dog barks or Bigg Boss makes an announcement about wearing the mic correctly, the house captain must administer a punishment of his choice to one of the housemates on behalf of the one who makes the mistake. Any housemate may place one of the knives on the captain's doll at any time throughout the week if they believe the captain is not entertaining, is not properly leading the house, or is biased. They must give valid reasons to the other housemates in the living area. If all three knives are placed on the doll before the end of the week, they will lose their position as captain. Captaincy status: The house captain (Vishal) had no knives placed on his doll at the end of Week 11. Open nomination process: The nomination process for the Week 11 eviction will be based on each contestant nominating two other housemates, stating their reasons in the presence of all housemates. Nomination free pass: On Day 74, Rayan won the Sengal Sengala task and was granted immunity from Week 12's eviction process. Goibibo passport stamp: Jeffry, Muthukumaran and Pavithra were chosen as the best performers by their housemates in the house based on their overall performance during Week 11.
Week 11	Captaincy Task	Thalaivana Thalaiviaa (Semma Weightu): Jacquline, Muthukumaran, and Vishal were chosen as the contenders for this task during Week 10 after being voted the best performers by their housemates from Weeks 1 to 10. A wheelbarrow is kept for each contender in the garden area. The remaining housemates are given badges with their weights written on them. The contenders will be assigned a specific weight target to achieve. Housemates must divide into three groups and stand near the contender they desire to support. When the initial buzzer sounds, the contender must transport each one of their supporters in the wheelbarrow to a marked zone on the opposite side. They must do so before the final buzzer sounds. Any supporter may move to another contender if they do not feel valued by the one they support at any point. When the final buzzer sounds, the contender who achieves the weight target first will win the captaincy task and become the house captain for Week 11. Supervisor: Ranjith
Week 11	Captaincy Task	Winner: Vishal
Week 11	Captaincy Task	Lost: Jacquline and Muthukumaran
Week 11	House Captain	Vishal
Week 11	Nominations	Raanav was directly nominated for the Week 11 eviction process at the end of the weekly task during Week 10.
Week 11	Nominations	Anshida, Arun, Deepak, Jacquline, Manjari, Muthukumaran, Pavithra, Ranjith, Rayan and Soundariya were nominated for the Week 11 eviction process.
Week 11	Tasks	Shopping task (Biscuit sapdunga friend): In the garden area, two platforms are kept. Two housemates at a time must stand on their respective platforms and place a biscuit on their forehead. Then they must use their facial movements to navigate the biscuits from their forehead to their mouth and eat them. Each biscuit eaten correctly in the specified way is worth 500 points. The amount of points obtained will determine the week's shopping budget. Supervisor: Vishal
Week 11	Tasks	Total points obtained: 4000
Week 11	Tasks	Weekly task (Sengal Sengala): In this task, housemates were divided into five teams, three of which had three members and the other two of which had two. In the garden area, a shared conveyor belt, five sets of different colored jackets, and five bases are kept for each team. Whenever the special buzzer sounds, stones will be sent through the conveyor belt. Only one member from each team must collect the stones, which will be used to build a fortress around the stand in the center of their bases. Housemates are not allowed to go beyond the line marked around the conveyor belt on all three sides to collect the stones. Whenever the stones are not sent, players must build their fortress and attack the others as well as defend theirs from opposing teams. The team that has the least stones at the end of each round will get eliminated from this task. The team that has the most stones will win this task and be awarded with a Nomination free pass, which they can use to save one of their teammates from Week 12's eviction process. Sengal Sengala Muyal 2.0 (Day 74): In addition to the existing rules, each team must gather rabbit dolls and protect them by keeping them inside the tower they have built against opposing teams. Any team can attempt to steal the rabbit dolls from opposing teams. Bigg Boss may send the rabbit dolls through the conveyor belt or let them fall from the sky. The team with the most rabbit dolls at the end will win this task and be awarded a Nomination free pass, which they can use to save one of their teammates from Week 12's eviction process.: Teams / Housemate; Blue / Deepak; Blue / Manjari; Blue / Muthukumaran; Pink / Anshida; Pink / Jeffry; Pink / Pavithra; Red / Arun; Red / Vishal; Red / Soundariya; Yellow / Jacquline; Yellow / Ranjith; Yellow / Rayan; Rounds / Teams / No. of stones remaining / / No. of rabbit dolls remaining / / Results; Rounds / Teams / Before / After / Before / After / Results; 1 / Blue / 17 / 52 / NA / / Advanced to Round 2; 1 / Pink / 17 / 94 / NA / / Advanced to Round 2; 1 / Yellow / 15 / 73 / NA / / Advanced to Round 2; 1 / Red / 14 / 6 / NA / / Eliminated in Round 1; 2 / Yellow / 73 / NA / NA / 4 / Winner; 2 / Blue / 52 / NA / NA / 1 / Eliminated in Round 2; 2 / Pink / 94 / NA / NA / 0 / Eliminated in Round 2; Notes: Raanav was severely injured during the early phases of this task and was unable to continue due to health concerns.; Deepak, Manjari, and Muthukumaran were combined into one team (Team Blue) following Raanav's exit from this task.; According to the new Bigg Boss rules, housemates must build a tower, and they cannot protect their stones by sitting or blocking them using their physique.; The winning criteria was changed to require that the team with the most rabbit dolls at the end of the task will win and receive a Nomination free pass, which they can use to save one of their teammates from Week 12's eviction process.; Result: Since Team Yellow won this task, they received the Nomination free pass and used it to save Rayan from Week 12's eviction process.
Week 11	Tasks	Winner: Team Yellow
Week 11	Tasks	Lost: Teams Red, Pink and Blue
Week 11	Sponsored	—N/a
Week 11	Punishments	When the Bigg Boss dog barks or an announcement is made to wear the mic correctly, house captain Vishal must give a punishment of his choice to one of the housemates on behalf of the one who made the mistake.; Due to many housemates' persistent rule violations over several weeks, including Week 12's captaincy task, Bigg Boss announced that it would be canceled, and there would be no house captain in Week 12.
Week 11	Exits	On Day 77, Ranjith was evicted after facing public votes.
Week 12	Twists	Closed nomination process: The nomination process for the Week 12 eviction will involve each contestant nominating two other housemates and explaining their reasons to Bigg Boss in the confession room.
Week 12	Captaincy Task	Thalaivana Thalaiviaa (Golmaal): Jeffry, Muthukumaran, and Pavithra were chosen as the contenders for this task during Week 11 after being voted the best performers by their housemates. In the garden area, a goalpost is kept for each contender along the circumference of a circular zone with a big ball in the middle of it. When the buzzer sounds, the contenders must put the ball in another contender's goalpost while simultaneously defending their own. The final contender not eliminated will win the captaincy task and become the house captain for Week 12. Supervisor: Vishal
Week 12	Captaincy Task	Task Cancelled by Bigg Boss
Week 12	House Captain	None
Week 12	Nominations	Anshida, Jacquline, Jeffry, Manjari, Pavithra, Raanav and Vishal were nominated for the Week 12 eviction process.
Week 12	Tasks	Shopping task (Paatu Onnu Naan Paadattuma): In the activity area, a song's lyrics will be read by Bigg Boss for every housemate. When the buzzer sounds, each housemate must guess the name of the song without discussing it with others. Each song guessed correctly is worth 1000 points. The amount of points obtained will determine the week's shopping budget.
Week 12	Tasks	Total points obtained: 7000
Week 12	Tasks	Family round task (Freeze or Release): As part of this task, all of the housemates' families will be allowed to enter the Bigg Boss house.: Bigg Boss will take full control over the task. He will instruct the housemates by using words like freeze and release.; Any of the housemates' family members can share their grievances, emotional upsets, and contradictions they have with the other housemates.; Day / Housemates / Family members; 79 / Deepak / Wife, Son and Friend; 79 / Manjari / Mother, Son, Sister and Brother-in-law, Friend; 79 / Vishal / Mother, Father and Grandmother, Friend; 79 / Rayan / Mother, Sister, Nephew and Niece; 80 / Soundariya / Mother, Father, Brother and Fiancé; 80 / Raanav / Mother, Father, Brother and Sister; 80 / Pavithra / Brother, Aunt and Cousin; Mother and Grandmother (voice only), Friend; 80 / Anshida / Mother and Brother; 81 / Jeffry / Mother and Father; 81 / Arun / Mother, Father and his Fiancé; 81 / Jacquline / Mother, Friend and her Fiancé; 81 / Muthukumaran / Mother, Father and Friend
Week 12	Tasks	Morning activity task: This task is held in the living area.: Day 78: Each housemate must reveal the people they still miss from the outside world, such as family and friends, over the previous 11 weeks, along with their reasons.
Week 12	Tasks	Goibibo's Burst your way to your dream destination task (Round 2): This task will be performed by housemates who were the best performers and received the most Goibibo stamps in their passports from Weeks 2 to 9. Deepak, Manjari, and Pavithra were eligible for this task based on the aforementioned criteria. In the activity area, multiple balloons with various chits are kept. However, only one of the balloons contains a chit with the Goibibo logo. When the buzzer sounds, the players must search for the balloon containing the Goibibo logo chit by bursting it. The player who finds the Goibibo logo chit first will be the winner of Goibibo's all-expenses-paid trip to their dream destination. The winner must roll the Goibibo dice, which has three sides with places selected from Goibibo's Dart task (Round 1) and three remaining sides containing mystery places. The place revealed after rolling the dice will determine the Goibibo Winner's dream destination. Goibibo's Top 3 Best performers (Weeks 2–9): Deepak, Manjari, and Pavithra; Goibibo's all-expenses-paid trip to dream destination Winner: Pavithra; Goibibo Winner's dream destination: Vietnam
Week 12	Sponsored	—N/a
Week 12	Punishments	—N/a
Week 12	Exits	On Days 83 & 84, Jeffry and Anshida Akbarsha were evicted after facing public votes in a double eviction twist.
Week 13	Twists	Open nomination process: The nomination process for the Week 13 eviction will involve each contestant nominating two other housemates and explaining their reasons to Bigg Boss in front of the plasma.
Week 13	Captaincy Task	—N/a
Week 13	House Captain	None
Week 13	Nominations	Arun, Deepak. Jacquline, Manjari, Pavithra, Raanav, Rayan and Vishal were nominated for week 13 eviction process.
Week 13	Tasks	TTF (Ticket To Finale): The top 10 housemates will participate in a series of tasks to gain their position in the finale and get the immunity to become a direct finalist. The housemate with the most points at the end of all the task will win TTF and become the first direct finalist of the season.: S.NO / Contestants / Task 1 / Task 2 / Task 3 / Task 4 / Task 5 / Task 6 / Task 7 / Task 8 / Task 9 / Task 10 / Total Points; 1 / Arun / 2 / 0 / 0 / 0 / 0 / 0 / 1 / -3 / 0 / 0 / 0 (3-3); 2 / Deepak / 0 / 1 / 2 / 0 / 0 / 2 / 0 / 5 / 0 / 4 / 14; 3 / Jacquline / 0 / 3 / 0 / 0 / -1 / 3 / 0 / -5 / 0 / 0 / 0 (6-6); 4 / Manjari / 0 / 1 / 0 / 3 / 1 / 0 / 1 / 7 / 1 / 3 / 17; 5 / Muthukumaran / 0 / 0 / 1 / 0 / 0 / 5 / 0 / 5 / 0 / 5 / 16; 6 / Pavithra / 0 / 2 / 0 / 0 / 0 / 1 / 1 / -4 / 0 / 0 / 0 (4-4); 7 / Raanav / 2 / 2 / 0 / -1 / 0 / 0 / 1 / 5 / 0 / 2 / 11(12–1); 8 / Rayan / 0 / 5 / 0 / -1 / 2 / 4 / 0 / 5 / 2 / 6 / 22 (23–1); 9 / Soundariya / 0 / 4 / 0 / 0 / 0 / 0 / 0 / 9 / 0 / 1 / 14; 10 / Vishal / 0 / 3 / 3 / -1 / 0 / 0 / 1 / -6 / 0 / 0 / 0 (7-7)
Week 13	Tasks	Winner: Rayan
Week 13	Tasks	Lost: Remaining Housemates
Week 13	Sponsored	—N/a
Week 13	Punishments	—N/a
Week 13	Exits	On Days 90 & 91, Raanav V C and Manjari Narayanan were evicted after facing public votes in a double eviction twist.
Week 14	Twists	Direct nomination process: The nomination process for the Week 14 eviction will involve each contestant nominated directly by Bigg Boss except the Ticket to Finale Winner. Wild Card Knockout: Week 14 brought back the first eight evicted contestants as challengers. They will compete against the Top 8 in the Wild Card Knock-Out task, where failed Top 8 contestants will face eviction and could be replaced by outperforming challengers.
Week 14	Captaincy Task	—N/a
Week 14	House Captain	None
Week 14	Nominations	Arun, Deepak, Jacquline, Pavithra, Soundariya, Muthukumaran and Vishal were nominated for week 14 eviction process.
Week 14	Tasks	Dance Marathon: All the housemates will dress up as a film actor/actress and will need to dance for the celebrities song when the song is played.
Week 14	Sponsored	—N/a
Week 14	Punishments	—N/a
Week 14	Exits	On Days 97 & 98, Arun Prasath and Deepak Dinkar were evicted after facing public votes in a double eviction twist.
Week 15 Finale Week	Twists	
Week 15 Finale Week	Captaincy Task	—N/a
Week 15 Finale Week	House Captain	None
Week 15 Finale Week	Nominations	Pavithra, Soundariya, Muthukumaran, Rayan and Vishal were nominated for the winner position as finalist.
Week 15 Finale Week	Tasks	Cash Box: S.no / Housemates / Task 1 / Task 2 / Task 3 / Task 4 / Task 5 / Task 6; 1 / Muthukumaran / ₹50,000 / ₹0 / ₹0 / ₹0 / ₹0 / ₹0; 2 / Soundariya / ₹0 / ₹0 / ₹0 / Quit / ₹0 / ₹0; 3 / Rayan / ₹0 / ₹200,000 / ₹0 / ₹0 / ₹0 / ₹0; 4 / Vishal / ₹0 / ₹0 / ₹0 / ₹0 / ₹500,000 / ₹0; 5 / Pavithra / ₹0 / ₹0 / ₹200,000 / ₹0 / ₹0 / ₹0; 6 / Jacquline / ₹0 / ₹0 / ₹0 / ₹0 / ₹0 / ₹800,000; Jacquline failed to comeback into the Bigg Boss house within the time limit after taking the cash. Hence she was evicted for failing the task.
Week 15 Finale Week	Tasks	Winner (Saved): Muthukumaran, Pavithra, Rayan, Soundariya and Vishal
Week 15 Finale Week	Tasks	Lost (Evicted): Jacquline
Week 15 Finale Week	Sponsored	—N/a
Week 15 Finale Week	Punishments	—N/a
Week 15 Finale Week	Exits	On Day 102, Jacquline Lydia was evicted from the house after failing to complete the cash grab task.
Day 105 Grand Finale
4th Runner-up		Rayan
3rd Runner-up		Pavithra Janani
2nd Runner-up		VJ Vishal
1st Runner-up		Soundariya Nanjundan
Winner		Muthukumaran Jegatheesan

== Nomination table ==
#BB8	Week 1			Week 2		Week 3		Week 4		Week 5		Week 6		Week 7		Week 8	Week 9	Week 10	Week 11	Week 12	Week 13		Week 14	Week 15		
#BB8	Day 1	Day 2	Day 5	Day 8	Day 12	Day 15	Day 19	Day 22	Day 26	Day 29	Day 31	Day 36	Day 40	Day 42	Day 44	Week 8	Week 9	Week 10	Week 11	Week 12	Day 85	Day 86-89	Week 14	Day 100-102	Day 105 Grand Finale	
Nominees for Captaincy	No; Captain	All housemates	Not eligible	Deepak; Jacquline; Pavithra; Sathya; Soundariya; Vishal	Not eligible	Ranjith; Tharshika	Not eligible	Ananthi; Muthukumaran	Not eligible	Ananthi; Sathya	Not eligible	Arun; Soundariya	Not eligible	Manjari; Vishal	Not eligible	Deepak; Pavithra	Jeffry; Sachana	Deepak; Manjari; Pavithra; Ranjith	Jacquline; Muthukumaran; Vishal	Jeffry; Muthukumaran; Pavithra	No Captain					
House; Captain	No; Captain	Tharshika		Sathya		Tharshika		Muthukumaran		Sathya		Arun		Manjari		Deepak	Jeffry	Ranjith	Vishal	Captaincy; Denied	No Captain					
Captain's nomination	No; Captain	Jacquline; Ranjith	Not eligible	Sachana; Soundariya	Not eligible	Muthukumaran; Soundariya	Not eligible	Pavithra; Sunita	Not eligible	Pavithra; Sachana	Not eligible	Varshini; Tharshika	Not eligible	Rayan; Arun	Not eligible	Sachana; Shiva	Sachana; Raanav	Tharshika; Rayan	Rayan; Manjari	None	No Captain					
Weekly Nomination free pass Winner Team	None				Team Girls	None	Team Girls	None	Team Girls	None	Team Boys	None	Team Boys	None	Team Boys	Weekly Nomination Free Pass no longer available Boys VS Girls theme concluded in Week 7										
Vote to:	24 Hours Elimination	Evict	None	Evict	Weekly Nomination free pass	Evict	Weekly Nomination free pass	Evict	Weekly Nomination free pass	Evict	Weekly Nomination free pass	Evict	Weekly Nomination free pass	Evict	Weekly Nomination free pass	Evict						Ticket to Finale	Evict	Task	WIN	
Muthukumaran	Jacquline	Ranjith; Arun	Not eligible	Jacquline (to evict)	Not eligible	Pavithra; Anshida	Not eligible	House; Captain	Not eligible	Anshida; Soundariya	Rejected; Weekly Nomination free pass	Sachana; Anshida	Not eligible	Tharshika; Pavithra	Rejected; Weekly Nomination free pass	Rayan; Anshida	Pavithra; Rayan	Anshida; Vishal	Soundariya; Arun	Anshida; Raanav	Soundariya; Raanav	Lost ticket to finale (Nominated)	Nominated	Completed Task (₹50,000)	Finalist	Winner (Day 105)
Soundariya	Arnav	Arun; Arnav	Not eligible	Muthukumaran; Jeffry	Rejected; Weekly Nomination free pass	Jacquline; Sunita	Rejected; Weekly Nomination free pass	Ranjith; Arun	Not eligible	Vishal (to evict)	Not eligible	Vishal; Ranjith	Not eligible	Arun; Raanav	Not eligible	Manjari; Vishal	Ananthi; Pavithra	Arun; Tharshika	Ranjith; Jacquline	Anshida; Jeffry	Muthukumaran; Jacquline	Lost ticket to finale (Nominated)	Nominated	Decided to Quit Task	Finalist	1st runner-up (Day 105)
Vishal	Jacquline	Jacquline; Muthukumaran	Not eligible	Sachana; Soundariya	Not eligible	Jacquline; Soundariya	Not eligible	Jacquline; Tharshika	Not eligible	Jacquline (to evict)	Rejected weekly Nomination free pass	Manjari; Varshini	Not eligible	Soundariya; Jacquline	Rejected; Weekly Nomination free pass	Manjari; Muthukumaran	Muthukumaran; Ananthi	Muthukumaran; Rayan	House; Captain	Pavithra; Manjari	Deepak; Jacquline	Lost ticket to finale (Nominated)	Nominated	Completed Task (₹5,00,000)	Finalist	2nd runner-up (Day 105)
Pavithra	Arnav	Ranjith; Jacquline	Not eligible	Deepak (to evict)	Not eligible	Sathya; Vishal	Granted Weekly Nomination free pass	Ranjith; Sathya	Rejected; Weekly Nomination free pass	Muthukumaran; Ranjith	Not eligible	Ranjith; Raanav	Not eligible	Vishal; Sathya	Not eligible	Vishal; Sathya	Soundariya; Muthukumaran	Vishal; Arun	Ranjith; Deepak	Vishal; Deepak	Deepak; Rayan	Lost ticket to finale (Nominated)	Nominated	Completed Task (₹2,00,000)	Finalist	3rd runner-up (Day 105)
Rayan	Not In; House									Sachana; Ananthi	Not eligible	Riya; Varshini	Not eligible	Varshini (to evict)	Rejected; Weekly Nomination free pass	Manjari; Shiva	Ananthi; Raanav	Anshida; Sathya	Deepak; Manjari	Granted Nomination free pass Vishal; Jeffry	Raanav; Arun	Won ticket to finale (Saved)	Saved (Finalist)	Completed Task (₹2,00,000)	Finalist	4th runner-up (Day 105)
Jacquline	Sachana	Vishal; Sunita	Not eligible	Arnav; Vishal	Granted Weekly Nomination free pass	Sathya; Anshida	Rejected; Weekly Nomination free pass	Arun; Jeffry	Rejected; Weekly Nomination free pass	Ranjith; Arun	Rejected; Weekly Nomination free pass	Shiva (to evict)	Not eligible	Arun; Vishal	Not eligible	Anshida; Shiva	Raanav; Tharshika	Arun; Anshida	Arun; Ranjith	Pavithra; Anshida	Vishal; Pavithra	Lost ticket to finale (Nominated)	Nominated	Failed Task	Evicted by Task (Day 102)	
Deepak	Sachana	Jacquline; Anshida	Not eligible	Soundariya; Pavithra	Not eligible	Dharsha (to evict)	Not eligible	Soundariya; Ananthi	Not eligible	Sachana; Ananthi	Rejected; Weekly Nomination free pass	Manjari; Jacquline	Granted Weekly Nomination free pass	Sachana; Tharshika	Not eligible	House; Captain	Manjari; Sachana	Pavithra; Tharshika	Ranjith; Pavithra	Raanav; Jeffry	Raanav; Pavithra	Lost ticket to finale (Nominated)	Nominated	Evicted (Day 98)		
Arun	Ravindar	uRavindar; Soundariya	Not eligible	Soundariya; Anshida	Not eligible	Jacquline; Anshida	Not eligible	Jacquline; Pavithra	Not eligible	Sunita; Ananthi	Rejected; Weekly Nomination free pass	House; Captain	Not eligible	Jacquline; Soundariya	Rejected; Weekly Nomination free pass	Manjari; Sachana	Manjari; Muthukumaran	Jacquline; Pavithra	Jacquline; Muthukumaran	Anshida; Jacquline	Manjari; Jacquline	Lost ticket to finale (Nominated)	Nominated	Evicted (Day 97)		
Manjari	Not In; House									Deepak; Arun	Not eligible	Raanav; Sathya	Not eligible	House; Captain	Not eligible	Sathya; Anshida	Sathya; Soundariya	Granted Nomination free pass Tharshika; Vishal	Anshida; Arun	Pavithra; Raanav	Arun; Vishal	Lost ticket to finale (Nominated)	Evicted (Day 91)			
Raanav	Not In; House									Anshida; Sunita	Not eligible	Soundariya (to evict)	Rejected; Weekly Nomination free pass	Anshida; Jacquline	Rejected; Weekly Nomination free pass	Rayan; Manjari	Rayan; Manjari	Rayan; Anshida	Rayan; Muthukumaran	Anshida; Manjari	Manjari; Rayan	Lost ticket to finale (Nominated)	Evicted (Day 90)			
Anshida	Sachana	Soundariya; Ravindar	Not eligible	Ranjith; Vishal	Not eligible	Muthukumaran; Sathya	Rejected; Weekly Nomination free pass	Arun; Sathya	Rejected; Weekly Nomination free pass	Muthukumaran; Arun	Not eligible	Rayan; Raanav	Not eligible	Muthukumaran (to evict)	Not eligible	Shiva; Manjari	Manjari; Rayan	Jacquline; Tharshika	Ranjith; Pavithra	Jacquline; Manjari	Evicted (Day 84)					
Jeffry	Sachana	Soundariya; Ravindar	Not eligible	Soundariya; Dharsha	Not eligible	Anshida; Jacquline	Not eligible	Anshida (to evict)	Not eligible	Ananthi; Sachana	Not eligible	Jacquline; Tharshika	Rejected; Weekly Nomination free pass	Sachana; Pavithra	Not eligible	Sachana; Ananthi	Granted Nomination free pass House; Captain	Soundariya; Rayan	Granted Nomination free pass Soundariya; Manjari	Jacquline; Manjari	Evicted (Day 83)					
Ranjith	Sachana	Ravindar; Muthukumaran	Not eligible	Soundariya; Ananthi	Not eligible	Anshida; Soundariya	Not eligible	Sunita; Jacquline	Not eligible	Pavithra; Tharshika	Granted Weekly Nomination free pass	Varshini; Riya	Rejected; Weekly Nomination free pass	Ananthi; Soundariya	Not eligible	Ananthi; Rayan	Manjari; Ananthi	House; Captain	Pavithra; Anshida	Evicted (Day 77)						
Tharshika	Ravindar	House; Captain	Not eligible	Arnav; Ranjith	Not eligible	House; Captain	Not eligible	Ranjith; Sathya	Not eligible	Ranjith; Deepak	Not eligible	Sathya; Jeffry	Not eligible	Shiva; Ranjith	Not eligible	Sathya; Ananthi	Jacquline; Muthukumaran	Sathya; Soundariya	Evicted (Day 70)							
Sathya	Muthukumaran	Ravindar; Muthukumaran	Not eligible	House; Captain	Not eligible	Pavithra; Jacquline	Not eligible	Jacquline; Sachana	Not eligible	House; Captain	Not eligible	Tharshika; Manjari	Rejected; Weekly Nomination free pass	Soundariya; Ananthi	Not eligible	Jacquline (to evict)	Ranjith; Manjari	Pavithra; Arun	Evicted (Day 69)							
Sachana	Jacquline	Evicted by Housemates (Day 1)	Re-entered (Day 5)	Jeffry; Muthukumaran	Rejected; Weekly Nomination free pass	Soundariya; Deepak	Not eligible	Deepak (to evict)	Not eligible	Ranjith; Deepak	Not eligible	Jeffry; Muthukumaran	Not eligible	Shiva; Rayan	Not eligible	Manjari; Anshida	Sathya; Tharshika	Evicted (Day 63)								
Ananthi	Ravindar	Deepak; Arun	Not eligible	Ranjith; Muthukumaran	Not eligible	Sathya; Soundariya	Not eligible	Sathya; Arun	Not eligible	Muthukumaran; Deepak	Not eligible	Ranjith; Raanav	Not eligible	Deepak; Rayan	Rejected; Weekly Nomination free pass	Ranjith (to evict)	Ranjith; Jacquline	Evicted (Day 63)								
Shiva	Not In; House									Sachana; Pavithra	Not eligible	Varshini; Sachana	Rejected; Weekly Nomination free pass	Ananthi; Pavithra	Granted Weekly Nomination free pass	Anshida; Manjari	Evicted (Day 56)									
Varshini	Not In; House									Ranjith; Arun	Not eligible	Raanav; Ranjith	Not eligible	Shiva; Raanav	Not eligible	Evicted (Day 49)										
Riya	Not In; House									Ranjith; Deepak	Not eligible	Ranjith; Raanav	Not eligible	Evicted (Day 42)												
Sunita	Jacquline	Jacquline; Ranjith	Not eligible	Ranjith; Arnav	Not eligible	Soundariya; Sathya	Not eligible	Jeffry; Arun	Granted Weekly Nomination free pass	Ranjith; Muthukumaran	Not eligible	Evicted (Day 35)														
Dharsha	Sathya	Soundariya; Arnav	Not eligible	Jeffry; Ranjith	Rejected; Weekly Nomination Free Pass	Arun (to evict)	Rejected; Weekly Nomination Free Pass	Evicted (Day 21)																		
Arnav	Anshida	Ravindar; Deepak	Not eligible	Dharsha; Soundariya	Not eligible	Evicted (Day 14)																				
Ravindar	Sachana	Anshida; Jeffry	Not eligible	Evicted (Day 7)																						
Notes	1, 2			3, 4, 5		6		7, 8		9, 10		11, 12		13		14	15, 16	17	18, 19	20, 21	22		23	24		
Against Public Vote	None	Arun; Jacquline; Muthukumaran; Ranjith; Ravindar; Soundariya		Arnav; Deepak; Dharsha; ~~Jacquline~~; Jeffry; Muthukumaran; Ranjith; Sachana; Soundariya; Vishal		Anshida; Arun; Dharsha; Jacquline; Muthukumaran; ~~Pavithra~~; Sathya; Soundariya		Anshida; Arun; Deepak; Jacquline; Jeffry; Pavithra; Ranjith; Sathya; ~~Sunita~~		Ananthi; Anshida; Arun; Deepak; Jacquline; Muthukumaran; Pavithra; ~~Ranjith~~; Sachana; Sunita; Vishal		~~Deepak~~; Jacquline; Jeffry; Manjari; Raanav; Ranjith; Riya; Sachana; Sathya; Shiva; Soundariya; Tharshika; Varshini		Ananthi; Arun; Jacquline; Muthukumaran; Pavithra; Raanav; Rayan; Sachana; ~~Shiva~~; Soundariya; Tharshika; Varshini; Vishal		Ananthi; Anshida; Jacquline; Manjari; Ranjith; Rayan; Sachana; Sathya; Shiva; Vishal	Ananthi; Jacquline; Manjari; Muthukumaran; Pavithra; Raanav; Ranjith; Rayan; Sachana; Sathya; Soundariya; Tharshika	Anshida; Arun; Jacquline; Pavithra; Rayan; Sathya; Soundariya; Tharshika; Vishal	Anshida; Arun; Deepak; Jacquline; Manjari; Muthukumaran; Pavithra; Raanav; Ranjith; Rayan; Soundariya	Anshida; Jacquline; Jeffry; Manjari; Pavithra; Raanav; Vishal	Arun; Deepak; Jacquline; Manjari; Pavithra; Raanav; ~~Rayan~~; Vishal		Arun; Deepak; Jacquline; Muthukumaran; Pavithra; Soundariya; Vishal	Jacquline; Muthukumaran; Pavithra; Rayan; Soundariya; Vishal	Muthukumaran; Pavithra; Rayan; Soundariya; Vishal	
Re-entered	None		Sachana	None																						
Ejected	None																									
Walked	None																									
Evicted	Sachana	Ravindar		Arnav		Dharsha		No; Eviction		Sunita		Riya		Varshini		Shiva	Ananthi	Sathya	Ranjith	Jeffry	Raanav		Arun	Jacquline	Rayan	Pavithra
Evicted	Sachana	Ravindar		Arnav		Dharsha		No; Eviction		Sunita		Riya		Varshini		Shiva	Sachana	Tharshika	Ranjith	Anshida	Manjari		Deepak	Jacquline	Vishal	Soundariya
Evicted	Sachana	Ravindar		Arnav		Dharsha		No; Eviction		Sunita		Riya		Varshini		Shiva	Sachana	Tharshika	Ranjith	Anshida	Manjari		Deepak	Jacquline	Muthukumaran	

indicates the House Captain.
indicates that the housemate was directly nominated for eviction prior to the regular nominations process.
indicates that the housemate was granted immunity from nominations.
indicates that housemate was evicted from the house.
indicates that housemate was ejected from the house.
indicates the housemate was self evicted from the house after failing to complete a task.
indicates the housemate is given the direct power to nominate another housemate for nomination.
indicates the housemate joined the boys' team.
indicates the housemate joined the girls' team.
indicates the winner.
indicates the first runner up.
indicates the second runner up.
indicates the third runner up.
indicates the fourth runner up.

=== Nomination notes ===
- ^1: Housemates must evict one teammate within 24 hours of the grand launch.
- ^2: On Day 5, Sachana re-entered the house.
- ^3: after a task, Arun won the nomination free task, saving him from the Week 2 eviction process and hence cannot be evicted that week.
- ^4: Muthukumaran and (Pavi) also known as pavithra were allowed to nominate one housemate for a direct nomination in Week 2.
- ^5: Team Girls won the nomination free pass and awarded it to Jacquline and she saved herself from Week 2 nomination.
- ^6: Team Girls won the nomination free pass and awarded it to Pavithra and she saved herself from Week 3 nomination.
- ^7: Team Girls won the nomination free pass and awarded it to Sunita and she saved herself from Week 4 nomination.
- ^8: Host Vijay Sethupathi cancelled the eviction for Week 4 due to Diwali-week celebrations in house.
- ^9: Manjari, Raanav, Rayan, Riya, Shiva and Varshini were granted immunity from nominations for Week 5 as the new entrants.
- ^10: Team Boys won the nomination free pass and awarded it to Ranjith and he saved himself from Week 5 nomination.
- ^11: During a task Deepak was selected as a least performer and hence was directly nominated for Week 6 nomination.
- ^12: Team Boys won the nomination free pass and awarded it to Deepak and he saved himself from Week 6 nomination.
- ^13: Team Boys won the nomination free pass and awarded it to Shiva and he saved himself from Week 7 nomination.
- ^14: On Day 50, Deepak was evicted due to surprise mid-week eviction twist
- ^15: Since Jeffry won the "Doll House" task in Week 8, he gained immunity and was saved from the Week 9 eviction process.
- ^16: The audience was asked if there should be an assistant captain for Week 9, and they voted yes. Hence, all the housemates voted for Sachana to be the assistant captain for Week 9.
- ^17: Since Manjari won the "Angels vs Devils" task in Week 9, she gained immunity and was saved from the Week 10 eviction process.
- ^18: Since Jeffry won the "Bigg Boss Factory" task in Week 10, he gained immunity and was saved from the Week 11 eviction process.
- ^19: During the "Bigg Boss Factory" task in Week 10, Raanav was voted to be directly nominated for the Week 11 eviction process by co-housemates.
- ^20: Since Team Yellow won the "Sengal Sengala" task in Week 11 and controversially awarded the nomination free pass to Rayan, he was saved from the Week 12 eviction process.
- ^21: During the captaincy task, Bigg Boss announced that there would no longer be house captain immunity for the season, as the contestants were accused of not playing the task to their full potential.
- ^22: Sandy won the ticket to the finale task and became the first finalist of the season.
- ^23: Since Rayan won the ticket to the finale, he is directly saved from the Week 13 eviction and was automatically exempt from the nomination process in Week 14.
- ^24: Since Jacquline failed to complete the Cash Box task, she was evicted from the Bigg Boss House and losing her position as a finalist.

== Criticism ==
Some viewers criticized host Vijay Sethupathi performance, alleging that he displayed favoritism toward the women's team and certain contestants during several weekend episodes. These audience members perceived his interactions and feedback as lacking neutrality, with some speculating that his approach was influenced by his public support for women's causes.

In addition, his decision to allow contestants to hear opinions directly from the public received mixed reactions. Critics argued that this was different from previous seasons, where contestants could only understand public opinion through audience applause and reactions during the weekend episodes. They felt that this change unnecessarily influenced the dynamics of the game.

His behaviour against the housemate 'Raanav VC' and his unfair eviction also sparked contreversy.

The eviction of house Jacquiline due to the incompletion of the cash task by just 3 seconds was not perceived good by the audience.

== Related shows ==
=== Bigg Boss 8 Munnottom ===
Bigg Boss 8 Munnottom also known as Aalum Pudhusu Aatamum Pudhusu is an Indian Tamil-language pre-launch television talk show hosted by Ma Ka Pa Anand and Mohamed Kuraishi. It features former contestants of Bigg Boss from the previous seven seasons along with the audience and fans of the Bigg Boss series and provides insights and discusses expectations ahead of the eighth season. The show is scheduled to air 6 October 2024 on Star Vijay 1.5 hours before the grand launch of Bigg Boss 8.

=== Bigg Boss 8 Fun Unlimited ===
Bigg Boss 8 Fun Unlimited is an Indian Tamil-language television talk show about the reality television series Bigg Boss Tamil. The show premiered on 20 October 2024 on Vijay Super and unaired portions of episodes are streamed on Disney+ Hotstar.
