= Gevi =

- Theatrical release poster
- Directed by: Tamil Dhayalan
- Written by: Raasi Thangadurai; Kirubakaran Yessaiah
- Produced by: Perumal Govindsamy; Jagan Jaya Surya
- Starring: Sheela Rajkumar; Jacquline Lydia; Aadhavan M Vivek Mohan
- Cinematography: Jagan Jaya Surya
- Edited by: Hari Kumaran
- Music by: Bala Subramanian
- Production company: Artuptriangles Film Kampany
- Distributed by: Uthraa Production
- Release date: 18 July 2025
- Country: India
- Language: Tamil

Gevi is a 2025 Indian Tamil-language action drama film directed by Tamil Dhayalan. Produced by Perumal Govindsamy and Jagan Jaya Surya under Artuptriangles Film Kampany the film stars Sheela Rajkumar, Jacquline Lydia and Aadhavan M in the lead roles.Vivek Mohan and Jeeva Subramaniam in supporting. It was theatrically released on 18 July 2025.

== Cast ==
- Sheela Rajkumar as Mandharai
- Jacquline Lydia as Alli
- Aadhavan M as Malayan
- Charles Vinoth
- Jeeva Subramanian
- S.K. Gaayathri
- Vivek Mohan as Mandharai's brother
- Umar Faroo

== Production ==
Gevi is directed by Tamil Dhayalan. It was produced by Perumal Govindsamy and Jagan Jaya Surya under Artuptriangles Film Kampany. The film's cinematography is handled by Jagan Jaya Surya, editing by Hari Kumaran and the music is composed by Bala Subramanian.

== Release ==
Gevi released in theatres on 18 July 2025.

== Reception ==
A critic of Dinamalar rated the film with 3/5 stars. Sreejith Mullappilly of Cinema Express gave 2.5/5 stars and wrote "While the film offers its messages with the subtlety of a sledgehammer, its bluntness keeps it from becoming problematic at any point. Somewhere in Gevi, there is a subtle suggestion that the community is partly to blame for their own status quo, but Tamil Dhayalan’s sensitive direction keeps it in safe territory."
