= Jacquline Lydia =

Indian actress and television presenter

- Born: Jacquline Lydia Y S 8 February 1996 (age 30); Pannur, Tamil Nadu, India
- Other names: VJ Jacquline; Jackline (Jack)
- Education: Visual communication
- Occupations: Actress; Television personality
- Years active: 2014–present
- Known for: Kalakka Povathu Yaaru? Kolamaavu Kokila; Thaenmozhi B.A; Bigg Boss 8

YouTube information
- Channel: Jack and Chill

Jacquline Lydia (born 8 February 1996) is an Indian actress and television presenter who appears in Tamil language television shows and films. She is known for hosting the standup comedy show Kalakka Povathu Yaaru? and playing the lead in Star Vijay's soap opera Thaenmozhi B.A. She is also known for role, Shobi in the film Kolamaavu Kokila (2018). In 2024, she participated in the reality TV show Bigg Boss 8 where she made history as the most nominated contestant of Bigg Boss Tamil.

== Personal life ==
Jacquline was born on 8 February 1996 in a telugu speaking family in the village Pannur, Tamil Nadu, India. Her father died when she was young, and she was brought up by her mother, Nirmala Stephen. She later did her schooling at ST. Mary Matriculation high school in Chennai. She later completed her degree in of Visual communication in Loyola College, Chennai.

== Career ==
Jacquline started her career in 2014 as a contestant in a talent show called Neengalum aagalam Vijay stars, in which she finished in 6th place among 15,000 other participants. In the same year, she made her acting debut as a supporting actress on Star Vijay's family drama Andal Azhagar, and then acted in the workplace comedy television series Office. In 2015, she started hosting the standup comedy show Kalakka Povathu Yaaru? in its 5th season, and continued hosting the show until its 7th season alongside Rakshan. In 2018, she participated as a contestant in Star Vijay's dancing reality show Jodi Fun Unlimited alongside Rakshan.

In 2018, she made her film debut as a supporting actress in the film Kolamaavu Kokila, where played the role of Nayanthara's younger sister Shobi. In 2019, she played the lead role in the serial Thaenmozhi B.A which aired on Star Vijay and received praise for her role as the lead by audience.

In 2024, she participated as a contestant on the Tamil reality series Bigg Boss Season 8. She was evicted from the house on Day 102 at 6th place, after failing to complete the Cash Grab Run Task. Her eviction was considered by the audience as one of the most unfair evictions in the show's history. She became the most nominated and the most saved contestant by audience votes in Indian Bigg Boss franchise and she is the only contestant in Bigg Boss Tamil's history to get evicted due to a task.

Apart from being an actress and TV host, she is also a YouTuber, with her YouTube channel currently boasting 265K subscribers.

== Filmography ==
=== Films ===
Year	Title	Role	Ref.
2018	Kolamaavu Kokila	Shobi	
2020	Kannum Kannum Kollaiyadithaal	Kaliswaran's friend	
2025	Gevi	Alli	

=== Television series ===
Year	Title	Role	Network	Notes
2014–2016	Andal Azhagar	Thenmozhi (Thenu)	Star Vijay	Supporting role
2014	Office	Jacqueline	Star Vijay	
2019–2021	Thaenmozhi B.A	Thenmozhi	Star Vijay	Lead role

=== Television shows ===
Year	Title	Role	Network	Notes
2014	Neengalum Aagalam Vijay Stars	Contestant	Star Vijay	Finalist (6th Place)
2015–2016	Kalakka Povathu Yaaru?	Host	Star Vijay	Hosted alongside Rakshan
2016–2017	Kalakka Povathu Yaaru?	Host	Star Vijay	Hosted alongside Rakshan
2017–2018	Kalakka Povathu Yaaru?	Host	Star Vijay	Hosted alongside Rakshan
2017	Athu Ithu Ethu 2	Participant	Star Vijay	
2017	Bigg Boss 1 Kondattam	Herself	Star Vijay	
2018	Jodi Fun Unlimited	Contestant	Star Vijay	Paired with Rakshan (8th place)
2020	Cooking Stars	Participant	Star Vijay	
2022	Oo Solriya Oo Oohm Solriya	Participant	Star Vijay	
2023	Anda Ka Kasam 2	Participant	Star Vijay	
2024	Pandigai Palagaram - Are U Ready	Host	Star Vijay	Hosted alongside Rakshan
2024–2025	Bigg Boss Tamil 8	Contestant	Star Vijay	Evicted Day 102 by task (6th Place)
2025	Bigg Boss 8 Kondattam	Herself	Star Vijay	
2025	Anda Ka Kasam 3	Participant	Star Vijay	

== Awards and nominations ==
Year	Award	Category	Work	Role	Result	Channel
2017	Vikatan Nambikkai Awards 2017	Best Video Jockey	Kalakka Povathu Yaaru?	Herself	Won	Vikatan TV
2017	3rd Annual Vijay Television Awards	Best Anchor- Female	Kalakka Povathu Yaaru?	Herself	Nominated	Star Vijay
2017	3rd Annual Vijay Television Awards	Best Anchor Duo (Nominated with Rakshan)	Kalakka Povathu Yaaru?	Herself	Nominated	Star Vijay
2018	4th Annual Vijay Television Awards	Best Anchor- Female	Kalakka Povathu Yaaru?	Herself	Nominated	Star Vijay
2018	4th Annual Vijay Television Awards	Best Anchor Duo (Nominated with Rakshan)	Kalakka Povathu Yaaru?	Herself	Nominated	Star Vijay
2018	Galatta Nakshathra TV & Film Awards	Best Anchor- Female	Kalakka Povathu Yaaru?	Herself	Nominated	Galatta Tamil
2019	Bofta Galatta Debut Awards 2018	Best Debutant Supporting Actor- Female	Kolamaavu Kokila	Shobi	Won	Galatta Tamil
2025	Super Women Awards 2025	Adventure Seeker	Bigg Boss Tamil 8	Herself	Won	SS Music
