= Thaenmozhi B.A =

Indian Tamil language television series

- Genre: Drama
- Created by: Endemol Productions
- Based on: Nimki Mukhiya
- Directed by: Francis Kadhiravan; Arul Rajesh Kadhivaran
- Starring: Jacquline Lydia; Siddharth; Usha Elizabeth; P.R Varalakshmi
- Country of origin: India
- Original language: Tamil
- No. of episodes: 491

Production
- Cinematography: Ramesh D.
- Editor: P.Arunkumar
- Running time: 22 minutes
- Production company: Endemol Shine India

Original release
- Network: Star Vijay
- Release: 26 August 2019 – 13 November 2021

Related
- Nimki Mukhiya

Thenmozhi B.k-Uratchi Mandra Thalaivar is a Tamil-language drama that aired on Star Vijay. It premiered on 26 August 2019, starring Jacquline Lydia and Siddharth. The show is a remake of the Star Bharat Hindi series Nimki Mukhiya. The series was abruptly halted on 4 January 2021, before the storyline was completed and relaunched on 18 January 2021, replacing Bigg Boss Tamil.

== Synopsis ==
The series revolves around the titular character Thenmozhi who becomes the head of her local village's government by accident. Thenmozhi must lead the Panchayat samiti while also navigating her love life, complicated by her engagement to the son of a local politician.

== Cast ==
=== Main ===
- Jacquline Lydia as Thenmozhi, Arul's wife.
- Siddharth Kumaran as Arulvel, Thenmozhi's husband
- Usha Elizabeth as Parameshwari aka Paramu, Arul's mother

=== Recurring ===
- Anjali Prabhakaran as Thamizhmadhi
  - Ashritha Sreedas replaced Anjali
- Naveen Vetri as Aravind
- Jeganathan as Devaraj, Arul's father
- P. R. Varalakshmi as Dheivanai, Arul's grandmother
  - Sumangali replaced Varalakshmi
- Manush Manmohan / jayaraman mohan as Nagaraj, Devi's husband
- Varun Udhai as Kanagavel, Arul's elder brother
- Stefy Remigius as Rekha, Kanagavel's wife
- Prabhakaran as Muthuvel, Arul's younger brother
  - SK Karthick replaced Prabhakaran
- Mohana as Arul's younger sister
- Britto as Maari, Arul's friend
- Ramesh (2019–2021) /Ravi shankar as Subbaiah, Thenmozhi's father
- Manukumar as Anbu, Thenmozhi's friend
- Adhil as Iniyan, Thenmozhi's younger brother
- Cumbum sellamuthu meena as Bhavani, Thenmozhi's aunt

== Adaptations ==
Language	Title	Original Release	Network(s)	Last aired	Notes
Hindi	Nimki Mukhiya निमकी मुखिया	28 August 2017	Star Bharat	10 August 2019	Original
Tamil	Thenmozhi B.A தேன்மொழி பி.ஏ	26 August 2019	Star Vijay	13 November 2021	Remake
Marathi	Pinkicha Vijay Aso! पिंकीचा विजय असो!	31 January 2022	Star Pravah	26 May 2024	Remake
