= Oo Solriya Oo Oohm Solriya =

Indian television series from 2022

- Genre: Game show; Reality
- Directed by: J. Richard Samson
- Presented by: Ma Ka Pa Anand; Priyanka Deshpande
- Country of origin: India
- Original language: Tamil
- No. of seasons: 3
- No. of episodes: 46+

Production
- Producer: R. Venkatesh Babu
- Production location: Tamil Nadu
- Camera setup: Multi-camera
- Running time: 42–50 minutes per episode
- Production company: Global Villagers

Original release
- Network: Star Vijay
- Release: 4 September 2022 – present

Oo Solriya Oo Oohm Solriya is an Indian-Tamil language reality television game show that airs on Star Vijay and streamed on Disney+ Hotstar. The show is hosted by Ma Ka Pa Anand and Priyanka Deshpande. The first season premiered on 4 September 2022 and ended with 26 Episode from 19 March 2023. The second season premiered on 19 October 2023 and ended on 17 March 2024. The third season premiered on 23 February 2025, and ended on 17 August 2025. In each episode, three participants contest across four rounds to win cash prizes.

== Hosts ==
- Ma Ka Pa Anand
- Priyanka Deshpande

== Seasons ==
Series	Episodes	Originally released	
Series	Episodes	First released	Last released
1	26	4 September 2022	19 March 2023
2	20	29 October 2023	17 March 2024
3	26	23 February 2025	17 August 2025

=== Season 1 ===
The first season aired on Sundays from 4 September 2022. The season ended on 19 March 2023 with 26 rpisodes.

Episodes	Airing	Contestants	Winner and notes
1	4 September 2022	Sivaangi, Santhosh Prathap, Pavithra	Sivaangi
2	11 September 2022	Sujitha, Kumaran Thangarajan, Kaavya Arivumani	Thangarajan
3	18 September 2022	Uma Riyaz Khan, Imman Annachi, Suresh Chakravarthy	Uma Riyaz Khan
4	25 September 2022	Amir & Pavani Reddy, Thamarai Selvi & Parathasarathi, Vinoth & Aiswarya	Thamarai Selvi & Parathasarathi
5	2 October 2022	Bala, Vidyullekha Raman, Grace Karunas	Grace Karunas
6	16 October 2022	Jagan, Samyuktha, Myna Nandhini	Myna Nandhini
7	23 October 2022	Pugazh, Archana Chandhoke, Anjana Rangan	Anjana Rangan
8	30 October 2022	Ganja Karuppu, Vanitha Vijayakumar, Kuraishi	Vanitha Vijayakumar
9	6 November 2022	Aarthi & Ganeshkar, Snehan & Kannika Ravi, Jacquline Lydia & Dheena	Aarthi & Ganeshkar
10	13 November 2022	Srinivasan, Shrutika, Reshma Pasupuleti	Shrutika
11	20 November 2022	Gabriella Charlton, Shobaana, Vinusha Devi	Vinusha Devi
12	27 November 2022	Maheshwari Chanakyan, Shanthi Arvind, Asal Kolaar	Asal Kolaar
13	4 December 2022	Roopa Sree, Deepa Shankar, Meena	Deepa Shankar
14	11 December 2022	Pavithra Janani, K.S. Suchitra Shetty, Nakshatra Nagesh	Nakshatra Nagesh
15	18 December 2022	Ashwin Kumar Lakshmikanthan, Kovai Sarala, Prabhu Solomon	Ashwin Kumar Lakshmikanthan
16	25 December 2022	Riya Vishwanathan, Deepak Dinkar, Ashwini Aanandita	Riya Vishwanathan
17	1 January 2023	Anitha Sampath, Sakshi Agarwal, Aishwarya Dutta	Anitha Sampath
18	8 January 2023	Ramar, Nisha, C. Ranganathan	Nisha
19	29 January 2023	G. Pechimuthu, Ayesha Zeenath, Queency Stanly	Ayesha Zeenath
20	5 February 2023	Kavin, Madurai Muthu, Harish	Kavin
21	12 February 2023	RJ Balaji, Raj Ayyappa, Vivek Prasanna	
22	19 February 2023	Rithika Tamil Selvi, VJ Parvathy, Erode Mahesh	Rithika Tamil Selvi
23	26 February 2023	Mohammed Azeem, Manikandan Rajesh, Dhanalakshmi	Dhanalakshmi
24	5 March 2023	Rio Raj, Malavika Manoj, Bhavya Trikha	Malavika Manoj
25	12 March 2023	Super Singer Stars	-
26	19 March 2023	Shivin Ganesan, Vikraman Radhakrishnan, Rachitha Mahalakshmi	Shivin Ganesan

=== Season 2 ===
The second season premiered on 19 October 2023 and was aired on Sundays. The show ended on 17 March 2024.

=== Season 3 ===
The third season premiered on 23 February 2025 and was aired on Sundays. It ended on 17 August 2025 with 26 episodes.

Episodes	Airing	Contestants	Notes
1	23 February 2025	Ambika, Meera Krishnan, Vinodhini Vaidyanathan	
2	2 March 2025	Dharsha Gupta (₹25,000/-), Tharshika (₹1,00,000/-), Riya	
3	9 March 2025	Natty Subramaniam, Mime Gopi, Kaavya Arivumani, Shathiga	
4	16 March 2025	Lakshmi Priya, Swaminathan, Kaavya Arivumani, Balaji	
5	23 March 2025	Shiva, Samyuktha, Soundariya Nanjundan	
6	30 March 2025	Mano, Anuradha Sriram, P. Unnikrishnan	
7	13 April 2025	Nivin, Yogi, Swetha, Sankavi, Banumathy, Punitha	
8	20 April 2025	Robo Shankar, Reshma Pasupuleti, Ramar	
9	27 April 2025	Chinni Jayanth, Mahendran, Yuvika Rajendran	
10	6 April 2025	Vanitha Vijayakumar, Robert	
11	4 May 2025	Aranthangi Nisha, Gayathri sri, Sanjana Singh	
12	11 May 2025	Namitha, Sureshi, Madurai Muthu	
13	18 May 2025	Janani, Archana Chandhoke, Sakshi Agarwal	
14	25 May 2025	Gomathi Priya, Shobana, Madhumitha Hirannaiah	
15	1 June 2025	Nirosha & Sharanya Turadi Sundarraj, Roopa Sree & Sathya, Sumalatha Madhan & Aarthi Subash	
16	8 June 2025	Myna Nandhini & Yogesh, Sangeetha & Aravinth Seiju, Sameer Ahamathu & Ajeeba	
17	15 June 2025		
18	22 June 2025		
19	29 June 2025	Deepak Dinkar, Muthukumaran, Manjari	
20	6 July 2025	Pavithra B. Naik, Suganya, Dhiraviam Rajakumaran	
21	13 July 2025	Sarath & Sundari, Thangadurai & Soundarya Chillukuri, Dolly & Umair Lateef	
22	20 July 2025	Rakshan, Angelin, Akshatha Das	
23	27 July 2025	House Mates Movie Team	
24	3 August 2025	Thalaivan Thalaiviis Movie Team	
25	10 August 2025	Heart Beat 2 series Team	
26	17 August 2025	Pavithra, Vishal, Anshida	

== Adaptation ==
Language	Series	Original release	Network	Last aired	Notes
Malayalam	Enkile Ennodu Para	26 October 2024	Asianet	23 March 2025	Remake
