= Cooku with Comali season 3 =

Cooku With Comali
- Season 3
- Hosted by: Rakshan
- Judges: Chef Damu; Chef Venkatesh Bhat
- No. of contestants: 12
- Winner: Shruthika Arjun
- Runner-up: Darshan
- No. of episodes: 54

Release
- Original network: Star Vijay
- Original release: 22 January – 24 July 2022

Season chronology
- ← Previous; Season 2 Next → Season 4

Cooku with Comali 3 is the third season of the Tamil reality cooking TV show Cooku with Comali, that was launched on 22 January 2022. This season is hosted by Rakshan, and judged by Chef Damodharan and Chef Venkatesh Bhat.

The Grand Finale Telecasted on 24 July 2022, with Shrutika winning the title and Darshan emerging as the runner up of the show.

== Contestants (Cooks) ==
| Name | Entry episode | Episode Exited | Status | Elimination Faced | Notes |
|---|---|---|---|---|---|
| Shruthika Arjun | Episode 1 | Episode 54 | Winner | 1 | |
| Darshan | Episode 1 | Episode 54 | 1st Runner up | 1 | |
| Ammu Abhirami | Episode 1 | Episode 54 | 2nd Runner Up | 2 | |
| Vidyullekha Raman | Episode 1 | Episode 54 | 3rd Runner Up | 2 | |
| Santhosh Prathap | Episode 1 | Episode 28 / Episode 54 | 4th Runner Up | 3 | Re-joined |
| Grace Karunas | Episode 1 | Episode 40 / Episode 54 | 5th Runner Up | 1 | Re-joined |
| Vettai Muthukumar | Episode 29 | Episode 50 | Eliminated | 2 | Wild card contestant |
| Roshini Haripriyan | Episode 1 | Episode 44 | Eliminated | 4 | |
| Chutti Aravind | Episode 29 | Episode 36 | Eliminated | 1 | Wild card contestant |
| Anthony Daasan | Episode 1 | Episode 18 | Eliminated | 2 | |
| Manobala | Episode 1 | Episode 14 | Eliminated | 1 | |
| Rahul Thatha | Episode 1 | Episode 8 | Eliminated | 1 | |

== Comalis ==
- Manimegalai
- KPY Bala (Winner Comali)
- Sivaangi Krishnakumar
- Sunita Gogoi
- Mohamed Kuraishi
- Sakthi Raj
- Adhirchi Arun
- Pugazh (Winner Comali)
- Mookuthi Murugan
- Bharat K Rajesh
- Sheethal Clarin
- Thangadurai
- Sarath Raj

== Weekly Summary ==
| Week | Cook of the week | Comali of the week | Advantage Task | Immunity Band | Elimination | Notes |
|---|---|---|---|---|---|---|
| 1 | —N/a | —N/a | —N/a | —N/a | —N/a | |
| 2 | Grace Karunas | Sheetal Clarin | —N/a | —N/a | —N/a | |
| 3 | Grace Karunas | Bharat K Rajesh | Manobala | Grace Karunas | —N/a | |
| 4 | Shrutika Arjun | Pugazh | Ammu Abhirami | —N/a | Rahul Thatha | |
| 5 | Anthony Daasan | Sunitha Gogoi | Roshini Haripriyan | Anthony Daasan | —N/a | |
| 6 | Grace Karunas | Bala | Grace Karunas | Celebration | | |
| 7 | Grace Karunas | Sunitha Gogoi | Shrutika Arjun | —N/a | Manobala | |
| 8 | Shrutika Arjun | Bala | Ammu Abhirami | Shrutika Arjun | —N/a | |
| 9 | Vidyullekha Raman Santhosh Prathap (joint winner) | Sunitha Gogoi | Roshini Haripriyan | —N/a | Anthony Daasan | |
| 10 | Dharsan | Sunitha Gogoi | Vidyullekha Raman | Dharsan | —N/a | |
| 11 | Ammu Abhirami | Mohamed Kuraishi | Shrutika Arjun | —N/a | Cancelled | |
| 12 | Dharsan | Sakthi Raj | Grace Karunas | Celebration | | Tamil Puththandu Celebration |
| 13 | Vidyullekha Raman | Bala | Ammu Abhirami | Vidyullekha Raman | —N/a | |
| 14 | Dharsan | Manimegalai | Santhosh Prathap | —N/a | Santhosh Prathap | |
| 15 | Grace Karunas | Sunita Gogoi | Vidyullekha Raman | Celebration | | Wildcard Round 1 |
| 16 | Dharsan | Mohamed Kuraishi | Roshini Haripriyan | Cancelled | —N/a | |
| 17 | Muthukumar | Mohamed Kuraishi | Dharsan | Muthukumar; Vidyullekha Raman | —N/a | |
| 18 | Ammu Abhirami | Bala | Dharsan | —N/a | Chutti Aravind | |
| 19 | Muthukumar | Manimegalai | Grace Karunas | Muthukumar | —N/a | |
| 20 | Shrutika Arjun | Adhirchi Arun | Grace Karunas | —N/a | Grace Karunas | |
| 21 | Shrutika Arjun | Bharat K Rajesh | Vidyullekha Raman | Shruthika Arjun | —N/a | Family Round |
| 22 | Darshan | Sunitha Gogoi | Muthukumar | —N/a | Roshini Haripriyan | |
| 23 | Dharshan & Kani | Sheetal & Sunita | Muthukumar & Pavithra | | | Season 2 and Season 3 celebration |
| 24 | Shrutika - 1st Finalist | Bala | Muthukumar | —N/a | —N/a | Ticket to Finale |
| 25 | Ammu Abhirami - 2nd Finalist Vidyullekha Raman - 3rd Finalist Dharsan - 4th Finalist | —N/a | Ammu Abhirami | —N/a | Muthukumar | Semi Finals |
| 26 | Grace Karunas - 5th Finalist Santhosh Prathap - 6th Finalist | Bala | Grace Karunas | —N/a | —N/a | Wildcard Round 2 |
| 27; GRAND FINALE | Finale Results: | | | | | |
| 27; GRAND FINALE | Grace Karunas (5th Runner Up) | | | | | |
| 27; GRAND FINALE | Santhosh Prathap (4th Runner Up) | | | | | |
| 27; GRAND FINALE | Vidyullekha Raman (3rd Runner Up) | | | | | |
| 27; GRAND FINALE | Ammu Abhirami (2nd Runner Up) | | | | | |
| 27; GRAND FINALE | Darshan (1st Runner Up) | | | | | |
| 27; GRAND FINALE | Shrutika Arjun (WINNER) | | | | | |

== Statistics ==
| Cook of the week | | Comali of the week | | Advantage Task | | Immunity Round | | Elimination Round | |
|---|---|---|---|---|---|---|---|---|---|
| Darshan | 6 | Sunitha Gogoi | 7 | Grace Karunas | 5 | Shrutika Arjun | 6 | Roshini Haripriyan | 4 |
| Shrutika Arjun | 5 | KPY Bala | 6 | Ammu Abhirami | 5 | Grace Karunas | 5 | Santhosh Prathap | 3 |
| Grace Karunas | 5 | Manimegalai | 2 | Roshini Haripriyan | 3 | Dharshan | 4 | Ammu Abhirami | 2 |
| Ammu Abhirami | 3 | Mohamed Kuraishi | 2 | Vidyullekha Raman | 3 | Muthukumar | 3 | Anthony Daasan | 2 |
| Vidyullekha Raman | 2 | Bharat K Rajesh | 2 | Dharsan | 3 | Vidyullekha Raman | 3 | Vidyullekha Raman | 2 |
| Muthukumar | 2 | Sheetal Clarin | 2 | Shrutika Arjun | 2 | Ammu Abhirami | 2 | Grace Karunas | 1 |
| Anthony Daasan | 1 | Pugazh | 1 | Santhosh Prathap | 1 | Roshini Haripriyan | 2 | Shrutika Arjun | 1 |
| Santhosh Pratap | 1 | Adhirchi Arun | 1 | Manobala | 1 | Santhosh Prathap | 1 | Chutti Aravind | 1 |
| | | Sakthi Raj | 1 | Muthukumar | 1 | Manobala | 1 | Manobala | 1 |
| | | | | | | Anthony Daasan | 1 | Rahul Thatha | 1 |
| | | | | | | | | Darshan | 1 |
| | | | | | | | | Muthukumar | 1 |

== Cook & Comali Pairings ==
| Cooks | Week 1 | Week 2 | Week 3 | Week 4 | Week 5 | Week 6 | Week 7 | Week 8 | Week 9 | Week 10 | Week 11 | Week 12 | Week 13 | Week 14 | Week 15 | Week 16 | Week 17 | Week 18 | Week 19 | Week 20 | Week 21 | Week 22 | Week 23 | Week 24 | Week 25 | Week 26 | Week 27 Round 1 | Week 27 Round 2 |
| Ammu Abhirami | Week 2 Entry | Adhirchi Arun | Adhirchi Arun | Bala | Mohamed Kuraishi | Adhirchi Arun | Bharat K Rajesh | Adhirchi Arun | Sivaangi Krishnakumar | Sivaangi Krishnakumar | Mohamed Kuraishi | Manimegalai | Mohamed Kuraishi | Sunita Gogoi | Sivaangi Krishnakumar | Not participated | Sunita Gogoi | Bala | Sivaangi Krishnakumar | Mohamed Kuraishi | Mohamed Kuraishi | Sivaangi Krishnakumar | Adhirchi Arun | Manimegalai | Bala / Manimegalai | Finalist | Pugazh | Mohamed Kuraishi |
| Darshan | Week 2 Entry | Sunita Gogoi | Pugazh | Mohamed Kuraishi | Adhirchi Arun | Manimegalai | Bala | Bharat K Rajesh | Manimegalai | Sunita Gogoi | Immunity | Sakthi Raj | Sivaangi Krishnakumar | Manimegalai | Mookuthi Murugan | Mohamed Kuraishi | Bala | Adhirchi Arun | Adhirchi Arun | Manimegalai | Tiger Thangadurai | Sunita Gogoi | Sheethal Clarin | Mohamed Kuraishi | Adhirchi Arun / Bharat K Rajesh | Finalist | Sunita Gogoi | Sivaangi Krishnakumar |
| Vidyullekha Raman | Mookuthi Murugan | Week 1 Entry | Sakthi Raj | Bharat K Rajesh | Sivaangi Krishnakumar | Mohamed Kuraishi | Adhirchi Arun | Sheethal Clarin | Sunitha Gogoi | Bala | Sivaangi Krishnakumar | Bala | Bala | Immunity | Manimegalai | Manimegalai | Adhirchi Arun | Immunity | Mohamed Kuraishi | Bala | Bala | Mohamed Kuraishi | Tiger Thangadurai | Sivaangi Krishnakumar | Sunita Gogoi / Sheethal Clarin | Finalist | Sivaangi Krishnakumar | Bala |
| Shruthika | Week 2 Entry | Sakthi Raj | Bala | Pugazh | Mookuthi Murugan | Sunita Gogoi | Mohamed Kuraishi | Bala | Immunity | Mohamed Kuraishi | Bala | Sivaangi Krishnakumar | Manimegalai | Sivaangi Krishnakumar | Mohamed Kuraishi | Not participated | Sivaangi Krishnakumar | Sunita Gogoi | Sunita Gogoi | Adhirchi Arun | Bharat K Rajesh | Immunity | Mohamed Kuraishi | Bala | Finalist | | Bala | Pugazh |
| Grace Karunas | Week 2 Entry | Sheethal Clarin | Bharat K Rajesh | Immunity | Bharat K Rajesh | Bala | Sunita Gogoi | Sunita Gogoi | Mohamed Kuraishi | Manimegalai | Bharat K Rajesh | Adhirchi Arun | Bharat K Rajesh | Mohamed Kuraishi | Sunita Gogoi | Sivaangi Krishnakumar | Sheethal Clarin | Bharat K Rajesh | Bala | Sunitha Gogoi | Eliminated | | | | | Bharat K Rajesh | Mohamed Kuraishi | Manimegalai |
| Santhosh Prathap | Manimegalai | Week 1 Entry | Sheethal Clarin | Sivaangi Krishnakumar | Sheethal Clarin | Pugazh | Sivaangi Krishnakumar | Mohamed Kuraishi | Bharat K Rajesh | Adhirchi Arun | Manimegalai | Sunita Gogoi | Adhirchi Arun | Sarath Raj | Eliminated | | | | | | | | | | | Bala | Manimegalai | Bharat K Rajesh / Adhirchi Arun |
| Vettai Muthukumar | Wildcard Contestant | | | | | | | | | | | | | | Bharat K Rajesh | Sunita Gogoi | Mohamed Kuraishi | Immunity | Manimegalai | Immunity | Sunita Gogoi | Bala | Sakthi Raj | Sunita Gogoi | Rakshan/ Sivaangi Krishnakumar Eliminated | Sunita Gogoi | | |
| Roshni Haripriyan | Mohamed Kuraishi | Week 1 Entry | Sunitha Gogoi | Manimegalai | Bala | Sivaangi Krishnakumar | Sheethal Clarin | Sivaangi Krishnakumar | Bala | Bharat K Rajesh | Sunitha Gogoi | Bharat K Rajesh | Sunita Gogoi | Bharat K Rajesh | Bala | Bala | Bharat K Rajesh | Mohamed Kuraishi | Pugazh | Bharat K Rajesh | Manimegalai | Manimegalai | Eliminated | | | Mohamed Kuraishi | | |
| Chutti Aravind | Wildcard Contestant | | | | | | | | | | | | | | Adhirchi Arun | Adhirchi Arun/Pugazh | Manimegalai | Sivaangi Krishnakumar | Eliminated | | | | | | | Sivaangi Krishnakumar | | |
| Anthony Daasan | Bharat K Rajesh | Week 1 Entry | Mohamed Kuraishi | Adhirchi Arun | Sunita Gogoi | Bharat K Rajesh | Immunity | Manimegalai | Pugazh | Eliminated | | | | | | | | | | | | | | | | | | |
| Manobala | Sivaangi Krishnakumar | Week 1 Entry | Mookuthi Murugan | Mookuthi Murugan | Manimegalai | Not participated | Manimegalai | Eliminated | | | | | | | | | | | | | | | | | | | | |
| Rahul Thatha | Week 2 Entry | Bala | Manimegalai | Sunitha Gogoi | Eliminated | | | | | | | | | | | | | | | | | | | | | Manimegalai | | |

| Cooks (Guests) | Week 23 |
| Kani Thiru | Sunita Gogoi |
| Shakeela | Bala |
| Pavithra Lakshmi | Pugazh |
| Rithika Tamil Selvi | Sarath Raj |
| Deepa Shankar | Sivaangi Krishnakumar |

== Pairing Matrix ==
| Cooks | Bala | Sivaangi Krishnakumar | Manimegalai | Sunita Gogoi | Mohamed Kuraishi | Bharat K Rajesh | Adhirchi Arun | Pugazh | Sheethal Clarin | Mookuthi Murugan | Sakthi Raj | Sarath Raj | Thangadurai |
| Ammu Abhirami | 3 Week 4 Week 18; Week 25 | 5 Week 9 Week 10; Week 15; Week 19; Week 22 | 3 Week 12; Week 24; Week 25 | 2 Week 14; Week 17 | 6 Week 5 Week 11; Week 13; Week 20; Week 21; Week 27 | 1 Week 7 | 5 Week 2 Week 3 Week 6 Week 8 Week 23 | 1 Week 27 | —N/a | —N/a | —N/a | —N/a | —N/a |
| Darshan | 2 Week 7 Week 17 | 2 Week 13 Week 27 | 4 Week 6 Week 9 Week 14; Week 20 | 4 Week 2 Week 10; Week 22; Week 27 | 3 Week 4 Week 16; Week 24 | 2 Week 8 Week 25 | 4 Week 5 Week 18; Week 19; Week 25 | 1 Week 3 | 1 Week 23 | 1 Week 15 | 1 Week 12 | —N/a | 1 Week 21 |
| Vidyullekha Raman | 6 Week 10; Week 12; Week 13; Week 20 Week 21 Week 27 | 4 Week 5 Week 11; Week 24; Week 27 | 2 Week 15; Week 16 | 2 Week 9 Week 25 | 3 Week 6 Week 19; Week 22 | 1 Week 4 | 2 Week 7 Week 17 | —N/a | 2 Week 8 Week 25 | 1 Week 1 | 1 Week 3 | —N/a | 1 Week 23 |
| Shruthika | 5 Week 3 Week 8 Week 11; Week 24; Week 27 | 3 Week 12; Week 14; Week 17 | 1 Week 13 | 3 Week 6 Week 18; Week 19 | 4 Week 7 Week 10; Week 15 Week 23 | 1 Week 21 | 1 Week 20 | 1 Week 4 | —N/a | —N/a | 1 Week 5 | 1 Week 2 | —N/a |
| Grace Karunas | 2 Week 6 Week 19 | 1 Week 16 | 2 Week 10 Week 27 | 4 Week 7 Week 8 Week 15; Week 20 | 3 Week 9 Week 14; Week 27 | 6 Week 3 Week 5 Week 11; Week 14; Week 18; Week 26 | 1 Week 12 | —N/a | 2 Week 2 Week 17 | —N/a | —N/a | —N/a | —N/a |
| Santhosh Prathap | 1 Week 26 | 3 Week 4 Week 7 | 3 Week 1 Week 11; Week 27 | 1 Week 12 | 1 Week 8 | 2 Week 9 Week27 | 3 Week 10; Week 13 Week 27 | 1 Week 6 | 2 Week 3 Week 5 | —N/a | —N/a | 1 Week 14 | —N/a |
| Muthukumar | 1 Week 22 | 1 Week 25 | 1 Week 19 | 4 Week 16; Week 26 Week 21; Week 24 | 1 Week 17 | 1 Week 15 | —N/a | —N/a | —N/a | —N/a | 1 Week 23 | —N/a | —N/a |
| Roshni Haripriyan | 4 Week 5 Week 9 Week 15; Week 16 | 2 Week 6 Week 8 | 3 Week 4 Week 21; Week 22 | 3 Week 3 Week 11; Week 13 | 3 Week 1 Week18; Week 26 | 5 Week 10; Week 12; Week 14; Week 17; Week 20 | —N/a | 1 Week 19 | 1 Week 7 | —N/a | —N/a | —N/a | —N/a |
| Chutti Aravind | —N/a | 2 Week 18; Week 26 | 1 Week 17 | —N/a | —N/a | —N/a | 2 Week 15; Week 16 | 1 Week 16 | —N/a | —N/a | —N/a | —N/a | —N/a |
| Anthony Daasan | —N/a | —N/a | 1 Week 8 | 1 Week 5 | 1 Week 3 | 2 Week 1 Week 6 | 1 Week 4 | 1 Week 9 | —N/a | —N/a | —N/a | —N/a | —N/a |
| Manobala | —N/a | 1 Week 1 | 2 Week 5 Week 7 | —N/a | —N/a | —N/a | —N/a | —N/a | —N/a | 2 Week 3 Week 4 | —N/a | —N/a | —N/a |
| Rahul Thatha | 1 Week 2 | —N/a | 2 Week 3 Week 26 | 1 Week 4 | —N/a | —N/a | —N/a | —N/a | —N/a | —N/a | —N/a | —N/a | —N/a |

== Special Guests ==
| Date | Guest | Note |
|---|---|---|
| 12 and 13 March 2022 | Dulquer Salmaan, Aditi Rao Hydari, Brinda | Hey Sinamika promotion |
| 14 and 15 May 2022 | Sivakarthikeyan, Priyanka Arul Mohan | Don promotion |
| 18 and 19 June 2022 | RJ Balaji, Pugazh | Veetla Vishesham promotion |
| 25 and 26 June 2022 | Kani Thiru, Shakeela, Pavithra Lakshmi, Rithika Tamil Selvi, Deepa Shankar | For Top Five contestants from Season 2 for celebration round |
| 2 and 3 July 2022 | R. Parthiban, Brigida Saga | Iravin Nizhal promotion |
| 9 and 10 July 2022 | Devadarshini, Chef Koushik | Semi Final |

Sheethal Clarin, Mookuthi Murugan, Sakthi Raj, Madurai Muthu, Sarath Raj and Pugazh are frequent guest comalis of the show
