= Cooku with Comali =

Indian Tamil-language comedy cooking reality programme

- Genre: Cooking show Comedy
- Directed by: Parthiv Mani (seasons 1–4)
- Presented by: Aranthangi Nisha (season 1); Rakshan (season 1–7); Manimegalai (season 5); Ma Ka Pa Anand (season 7); Shaalin Zoya (season 7)
- Judges: Chef Damu (season 1–7); Chef Venkatesh Bhat (seasons 1–4); Madhampatty Rangaraj (season 5–present); Koushik Shankar (season 6–present); Roja Selvamani (season 7–present)
- Country of origin: India
- Original language: Tamil
- No. of seasons: 7
- No. of episodes: 250+

Production
- Editors: Jaganathan; Aravinth Sridhar; Raghuraman
- Camera setup: Multi-camera
- Running time: 60 minutes
- Production companies: Media Masons (season 1–4); Box Office Studio (season 5–present)

Original release
- Network: Star Vijay; Disney+ Hotstar
- Release: 16 November 2019 – present

Related
- Top Cooku Dupe Cooku

Cooku with Comali (transl. Cook with Clown), also known by the acronym CWC, is an Indian Tamil-language comedy-based cooking competition show aired on Star Vijay and streams on Disney+ Hotstar where the contestants are paired each week with comedians (comalis) who are amateur cooks. The first season premiered on 16 November 2019 and ended on 23 February 2020. The second season premiered on 14 November 2020 and ended on 14 April 2021. The third season premiered on 22 January 2022 and ended on 24 July 2022. The fourth season premiered on 28 January 2023 and ended on 30 July 2023. The contestants along with their comalis are challenged every week and are judged by Chef Damu and Chef Venkatesh Bhat until season 4.

== Production ==
=== Game format ===
Every week, the show starts with celebrity chefs getting paired with their Comalis. Then the teams compete in Advantage Task 1 and Task 2. The teams then compete in Main Task and Immunity/Elimination Task. The Advantage task involves a minimal task in which a team does a small task and the winner of the Advantage task is given an advantage during the main task where the team can choose a time frame to work without any obstacles. During the Main task, every team is given a challenge or an obstacle that will make the cooking harder. The teams are given a specific time limit where they must cook with that time frame. Most of the cooking tasks are to be done by Comalis. The cook that gets Immunity is safe from next week's elimination and does not participate in that week. Some weeks are celebration rounds with no elimination.

== Overview ==
Series	Main Host	Special Host	Judge 1	Judge 2	Judge 3	Judge 4	Prize Money	Episodes	Originally released			Contestants	Launch TRP Ratings	Finale TRP Ratings	Winner	Runner-up
Series	Main Host	Special Host	Judge 1	Judge 2	Judge 3	Judge 4	Prize Money	Episodes	First released	Last released	Network	Contestants	Launch TRP Ratings	Finale TRP Ratings	Winner	Runner-up
1	Rakshan	Aranthangi Nisha	Chef Damodharan	Chef Venkatesh Bhat	-	-	₹5 lakh (US$5,300)	27	16 November 2019	23 February 2020	Star Vijay & Disney+ Hotstar	8	7.75 TVR	10.22 TVR	Vanitha Vijayakumar	Uma Riyaz Khan
2	Rakshan	–	Chef Damodharan	Chef Venkatesh Bhat	-	-	₹5 lakh (US$5,300)	41	14 November 2020	14 April 2021	Star Vijay & Disney+ Hotstar	9	13.97 TVR	21.39 TVR	Kani Thiru	Shakeela
3	Rakshan	–	Chef Damodharan	Chef Venkatesh Bhat	-	-	₹5 lakh (US$5,300)	54	22 January 2022	24 July 2022	Star Vijay & Disney+ Hotstar	12	11.1 TVR	12.8 TVR	Shrutika Arjun	Darshan
4	Rakshan	Manimegalai	Chef Damodharan	Chef Venkatesh Bhat	-	-	₹5 lakh (US$5,300)	53	28 January 2023	30 July 2023	Star Vijay & Disney+ Hotstar	12	10.5 TVR	10.9 TVR	Mime Gopi	Srushti Dange
5	Rakshan	Manimegalai	Chef Damodharan	Madhampatty Rangaraj	-	-	₹5 lakh (US$5,300)	46	27 April 2024	29 September 2024	Star Vijay & Disney+ Hotstar	10	8.72	8.21	Priyanka Deshpande	Sujitha
6	Rakshan	–	Chef Damodharan	Madhampatty Rangaraj	Chef Koushik Shankar	-	₹5 lakh (US$5,300)	43	4 May 2025	28 September 2025	Star Vijay & Disney+ Hotstar	10	5.78	TBA	Raju Jeyamohan	Shabana Shajahan Aryan
7	Rakshan	Makapa Anand and Shaalin Zoya	Chef Damodharan	Madhampatty Rangaraj	Chef Koushik Shankar	Roja Selvamani	₹5 lakh (US$5,300)	TBA	4 April 2026	TBA	Star Vijay & Disney+ Hotstar	9	TBA	TBA	TBA	TBA

== Season 1 ==
The first season of the Tamil reality cooking TV show Cooku with Comali, that was aired first 16 November 2019. This season was hosted by Rakshan and Aranthangi Nisha. The grand finale was aired on 23 February 2020 and winner was Vanitha Vijayakumar.

=== Contestants ===
Contestants	Status
Vanitha Vijayakumar	Winner
Uma Riyaz Khan	1st Runner-Up
Ramya Pandian	2nd Runner-Up
Rekha	3rd Runner-Up
Priyanka Robo Shankar	Eliminated
Thaadi Balaji	Eliminated
G. Gnanasambandan	Eliminated
Mohan Vaidya	Eliminated

=== Comalis ===
- KPY Bala
- Pugazh
- Manimegalai
- Sivaangi
- Thangadurai
- Sai Sakthi
- Bijili Ramesh
- Pappu

== Season 2 ==
The second season of the Tamil reality cooking TV show Cooku with Comali, that was aired first on 14 November 2020. This season was hosted by Rakshan. The grand finale was aired on 14 April 2021 and winner was Kani Thiru.

=== Contestants ===
Contestants	Status
Kani Thiru	Winner
Shakeela	1st Runner-Up
Ashwin Kumar Lakshmikanthan	2nd Runner-Up
Pavithra Lakshmi	3rd Runner-Up
Baba Bhaskar	4th Runner-Up
Rithika Tamil Selvi	Eliminated
Dharsha Gupta	Eliminated
Deepa Shankar	Eliminated
Madurai Muthu	Eliminated

=== Comalis ===
- KPY Bala
- Pugazh
- Manimegalai
- Sivaangi ‘’’(Winner Comali) ‘’’
- Sunita Gogoi ‘’’‘’’
- Thangadurai
- Shakthi
- Parvathy-Pappu
- Sarath

== Season 3 ==
The third season aired on every Saturday and Sunday from 12 January 2022 to 24 July 2022 and ended with 54 Episodes. The winner of the season was Shrutika. This season is hosted by Rakshan and judged by Chef Damodharan and Chef Venkatesh Bhat.

Contestants	Status
Shruthika	Winner
Darshan	1st Runner-Up
Ammu Abhirami	2nd Runner-Up
Vidyullekha Raman	3rd Runner-Up
Santhosh Prathap	4th Runner-Up
Grace Karunas	5th Runner-Up
Vettai Muthukumar	Eliminated
Roshini Haripriyan	Eliminated
Chutti Aravind	Eliminated
Anthony Daasan	Eliminated
Manobala	Eliminated
Rahul Thatha	Eliminated

== Season 4 ==
The fourth season aired on every Saturday and Sunday from 28 January 2023 to 30 July 2023 and ended with 43 Episodes. It was hosted by Rakshan. The winner of the season was Mime Gopi, and actress Srushti Dange was the runner-up.

Contestants	Status
Mime Gopi	Winner
Srushti Dange	1st Runner-Up
Vichithra	2nd Runner-Up
Sivaangi Krishnakumar	3rd Runner-Up
Andreanne Nouyrigat	4th Runner-Up
D. R. K. Kiran	5th Runner-Up
Gajesh	Eliminated
Sherin Shringar	Eliminated
VJ Vishal	Eliminated
Raj Ayyappa	Eliminated
Kalaiyan	Eliminated
Kishore Rajkumar	Eliminated

== Season 5 ==
The fifth season airs on every Saturday and Sunday from on April 27, 2024 at 21:30.

Contestants	Status
Priyanka Deshpande	Winner
Sujitha	1st Runner-Up
Mohammad Irfan	2nd Runner-Up
Pooja Venkat	3rd Runner-Up
Shaalin Zoya	4th Runner-Up
VTV Ganesh	5th Runner-Up
Vasanth Vasi	Eliminated
Dhivya Duraisamy	Eliminated
Srikanth Deva	Eliminated
Akshay Kamal	Eliminated

== Season 6 ==
The sixth season aired from May 04, 2025 to 28 September 2025.

Contestants	Status
Raju Jeyamohan	Winner
Shabana Shajahan	1st Runner-Up
Umair Lateef	2nd Runner-Up
Lakshmy Ramakrishnan	3rd Runner-Up
Priya Raman	Eliminated
Nanda Kumar	Eliminated
Jangiri Madhumitha	Eliminated
Sundari	Eliminated
Ganja Karuppu	Eliminated
Soundarya Chillukuri	Eliminated

== Season 7 ==
The seventh season premiered on 4 April 2026.The show started with special hosts as Makapa Anand and season 5 contestant Shaalin Zoya,Later the main host Rakshan returned to the show

Contestants	Status
Aravinth Seiju & Sangeetha Sai	Eliminated
Anirudha Srikkanth & Samyuktha Shanmuganathan	Title winner
Gaana Vinoth & Bhagya	Eliminated
Aranthangi Nisha & Riaz Ali	Eliminated
Mahendran & Shantha	Eliminated
Dravid Selvam & Raji Dravid	Eliminated
Kongu Manjunathan & Rajeshwari Manjunathan	Eliminated
Sidhu Sid & Shreya Anchan	runnerup
Mano & Jameela Babu	Quit

== Production ==
Media Masons produced season one to four and on 2024, producer Ravoofa announced at the end of February that their company was quitting Star Vijay television after 25 years. Later on the production company Media Masons decide to produce a new cooking show like Cooku with Comali on Sun TV called Top Cooku Dupe Cooku. After this Box Office studio took over the production of Cooku with Comali from season five.

== Reception ==
The series gained popularity only during its re – telecast in the COVID-19 lockdown in 2020. Following which the launch of the second season became one of the top rated Tamil reality television program both on television and on the digital platform Hotstar.

The grand finale of season 2 aired on 14 April 2021 for 6 hours garnered a high viewership rating of 11.1 TVR in urban and 8.1 TVR overall with 6.58 million impressions.

== Adaptations ==
Language	Title	Network	Premiere date	Last Aired	Seasons	Ref
Kannada	Cookku with Kirikku ಕಿರಿಕ್ಕು ಜೊತೆ ಕುಕ್ಕು	Star Suvarna	10 April 2021	15 August 2021	1	
Bengali	Gole Male Gol গোলে পুরুষ গোল	Star Jalsha	25 September 2021	14 November 2021	1	
Malayalam	Cook with Comedy കുക്ക് വിത്ത് കോമഡി	Asianet	6 May 2023	8 July 2023	1	
Hindustani (Hindi–Urdu)	Laughter Chefs – Unlimited Entertainment लाफ्टर शेफ्स – अनलिमिटेड एंटरटेनमेंट	Colors TV	1 June 2024	26 July 2026	3	
Marathi	Shitti Vajali Re शिट्टी वाजली रे	Star Pravah	26 April 2025	3 August 2025	1	
Kannada	Kwatle Kitchen ಕ್ವಾಟ್ಲೆ ಕಿಚನ್	Colors Kannada	14 June 2025	Ongoing	2	
Telugu	Cooku with Jathirathnalu కూకూ విత్ జాతిరత్నాలు	Star Maa	28 June 2025	Ongoing	2	
Malayalam	Comedy Cooks കോമഡി കുക്ക്സ്	Asianet	18 April 2026	2 August 2026	1	
Inspired / Unofficial adaptations
Tamil	Top Cooku Dupe Cooku	Sun TV	19 May 2024	Ongoing	2	
Hindustani (Hindi–Urdu)	Kashmir Comedy Kitchen	Green TV	29 August 2025	21 November 2025	1	
