= Kalakka Povathu Yaaru? Champions =

Indian TV series

- Original title: கலக்க போவது யாரு? சாம்பியன்
- Genre: Stand-up comedy
- Presented by: season 1: Sriranjani Sundaram; VJ Pappu; season 2: Rakshan; Manimegalai; season 3: Myna Nandhini; Erode Mahesh; season 4: Aranthangi Nisha; KPY Bala
- Judges: season 1: Grace Karunas; Thadi Balaji; Ma Ka Pa Anand; season 2: Grace Karunas; Thadi Balaji; Myna Nandhini: Ma Ka Pa Anand; season 3: Robo Shankar; Archana Chandhoke; Madurai Muthu; season 4: Reshma Pasupuleti; Madurai Muthu; Thadi Balaji; Shrutika; Nandini
- Country of origin: India
- Original language: Tamil
- No. of seasons: 3
- No. of episodes: 112

Production
- Production location: Tamil Nadu
- Camera setup: Multi-camera
- Running time: approx.42–50 minutes per episode

Original release
- Network: Star Vijay
- Release: 18 June 2017 – present

Related
- Kalakka Povathu Yaaru?

Kalakka Povathu Yaaru? Champions or KPY Champions is a 2017 Indian Tamil-language reality stand-up comedy television show that airs on Star Vijay and streams on Disney+ Hotstar. Over six years, KPY Champions has aired three seasons. Grace Karunas, Thadi Balaji and Ma Ka Pa Anand were the judges for the first two seasons.

The first season premiered on 18 June 2017.

== Overview ==
Season	Episodes	Original Broadcast		Winner
Season	Episodes	First Aired	Last Aired	Winner
1	84	18 June 2017	27 January 2019	Pulikesi Team
2	23	11 August 2019	2 February 2020	Kalakka Povathu Yaaru? 6 Team
3	25	20 February 2022	14 August 2022	Amuthavanan and Pazhani Pattalam, Azhar and TSK
4	17	19 February 2023	11 June 2023	Bloody sweet Team

== Season 1 ==
The first season had eighty-four episodes and featured contestants from Kalakka Povathu Yaaru? Season 5 and Season 6, and the Siricha Pochu team.

Grace Karunas, Thadi Balaji and Ma Ka Pa Anand judged Sriranjani Sundaram and VJ Pappu hosted the show. The winner of the season was Pulikesi Team, and Anja Singam was the runner-up.

- Winner: Pulikesi Team
- First Runners-Up: Anja Singam

== Season 2 ==
The second season had twenty three episodes, judged by the previous season's Grace Karunas, Thadi Balaji and Ma Ka Pa Anand. They were accompanied by a new judge, Myna Nandhini. It was hosted by Rakshan and Manimegalai.

- Winner: Kalakka Povathu Yaaru? 6 Team

== Season 3 ==
The third Season of KPY Champions was called Kalakka Povathu Yaaru? Champions Doubles. It was premiered on 20 February 2022 and ended on 14 August 2022. There were twenty five episodes. The judges were Madurai Muthu, Robo Shankar and Archana Chandhoke and the hosts were Myna Nandhini and Erode Mahesh.

- Winner: Amuthavanan and Pazhani Pattalam, Azhar and TSK
- First Runners-Up: Sathish and Rajuvelu

=== Contestants ===
- Bala and Vinoth
- Raja and Yogi
- Azhar and TSK
- Amudavanan and Palani Pattalam
- Naveen and Sharath
- Sathish and Rajavelu
- Ramar and Nisha
- Adhavan and Jayachandaran

== Season 4 ==
The fourth season of KPY Champions aired every Sunday at 13:30, from 19 February 2023. Reshma Pasupuleti, Madurai Muthu, Dhadi Balaji, Shrutika and "Myna" Nandini (who replaced Shruthika) were the judges, whereas KPY Bala and Aranthangi Nisha were the hosts.

Bloody sweet Team (announced by actor Senthil) was announced the Winner of the 'Kalakka Povathu Yaaru? Champions' and received a 3 lakhs award by Star Vijay. Mamakutty Team was the first runner up of the season and was awarded an amount of 2 lakhs.

- Winner: Bloody sweet Team
- First Runners-Up: Mamakutty Team
- Second Runners-Up: Eppudida Team

== Episodes ==
Episodes	Airing	Round	Guests	Reference
1	19 February 2023	Fun Overloaded	Seeman	
2	26 February 2023	Laugher Riot	Seeman	
3	5 March 2023	Ramarajan Graces the Show	Ramarajan	
4	12 March 2023	A Comic Riot	Radha Ravi	
5	19 March 2023	The Spoof Round	Radha Ravi	
6	26 March 2023	Tent Kotta Round	Bhagyaraj & Dindigul I. Leoni	
7	2 April 2023	Entertainment Guaranteed	Gautam Karthik & Pugazh	
8	9 April 2023	The Thriller Round	Vinusha Devi & Sobana	
9	16 April 2023	Summer Special	Shakeela & Vanitha Vijayakumar	
10	23 April 2023	Pasamalar Round	Amuthavaanan, Janani & Dhanalakshmi	
11	30 April 2023	Unlimited Entertainment	Roopa Sree & Meena Vemuri	
12	7 May 2023	Entertainment Guaranteed	Farina Azad & Asha	
13	14 May 2023	Thillu Mullu Round	Manikandan & Meetha Raghunath (cast of Good Night)	
14	21 May 2023	Sidharth Joins the Fun	Siddharth	
15	28 May 2023	Fun with Arya	Arya	
16	4 June 2023	Back to School	Siddharth & Gabriella	
17	11 June 2023	The Final Battle	Senthil	
