= Kalakka Povathu Yaaru? =

Indian comedy reality television show

- Original title: கலக்க போவது யாரு?
- Genre: Stand-up comedy
- Presented by: season 1; Uma Riyaz Khan; season 2; Swarnamalya; season 3; Mimicry Sethu; Dhivyadharshini; season 4; Sethu; Ramya Subramanian; season 5-7; Rakshan; Jacquline Lydia; season 8; Thadi Balaji; Erode Mahesh; season 9; Azhar; Naveen; season 10; Aranthangi Nisha; Vinoth Babu
- Judges: season 1; Madhan Bob; Chinni Jayanth; season 2; Pandiarajan; Sadagoppan Ramesh; season 3; Uma Riyaz Khan; V. Sekhar; season 4; Uma Riyaz Khan; Pandiarajan; season 5; Erode Mahesh; Thadi Balaji; Mimicry Sethu; Priyanka Deshpande; Aarthi; Madhumitha; Myna Nandhini; season 6-7; Thadi Balaji; Erode Mahesh; Mimicry Sethu; Priyanka Deshpande; Aarthi; season 8; Kovai Sarala; Radha; season 9; Ramya Pandian; Vanitha Vijayakumar; Erode Mahesh; Madurai Muthu; Aadhavan; season 10; Pugazh; Madurai Muthu; Ramar; Amudhavanan
- Country of origin: India
- Original language: Tamil
- No. of seasons: 9

Production
- Production location: Tamil Nadu
- Camera setup: Multi-camera
- Running time: approx.42–50 minutes per episode

Original release
- Network: Star Vijay
- Release: 2005 – present

Related
- Kalakka Povathu Yaaru? Champions

Kalakka Povathu Yaaru? (transl. Who's going to participate?) is a 2005 Indian Tamil-language reality stand-up comedy television show that airs on Star Vijay and streams on Disney+ Hotstar. Over twenty years, Kalakka Povathu Yaaru? has had ten seasons. The winners of the show are awarded the title of Comedy King and cash prizes. The first season premiered in 2005.

== Overview ==
Season	Episodes	Original Broadcast		Winner
Season	Episodes	First Aired	Last Aired	Winner
1		2005		Kovai Guna
2		2006		Sivakarthikeyan
3		2007		Aadhavan
4		2008		Arjun
5	54	26 July 2015	14 August 2016	Mohamed Kuraishi
6	41	21 August 2016	11 June 2017	Vinoth & Bala
7	51	1 October 2017	1 April 2018	Azhar & TSK
8	41	19 January 2019	15 June 2019	Niranjana
9	28	9 February 2020	27 December 2020	Jayachandran
10	19	1 December 2024	30 April 2025	Nathiya & Saravanan

== Season 1 ==
The first season of Kalakka Povathu Yaaru? was aired in 2005. Madhan Bob and Chinni Jayanth as the judges, Uma Riyaz Khan as the host. Kovai Guna was announced the Winner of the Kalakka Povathu Yaaru? season 1.

Prize Winners:

- Winner: 'Kovai' Guna

== Season 2 ==
The second season of Kalakka Povathu Yaaru? 2 was aired in 2006. Pandiarajan and Sadagoppan Ramesh as the judges, Swarnamalya as the host. Sivakarthikeyan was the Winner of the Kalakka Povathu Yaaru? season 2.

Prize Winners:

- Winner: Sivakarthikeyan

== Season 3 ==
The third season of Kalakka Povathu Yaaru? 3 was aired in 2007. Uma Riyaz Khan and V. Sekhar as the judges. Mimicry Sethu and Dhivyadharshini as the hosts. Aadhavan was the Winner of this season.

Prize Winners:

- Winner: Aadhavan

== Season 4 ==
The fourth season of Kalakka Povathu Yaaru? 4 was aired in 2008. Uma Riyaz Khan and Pandiarajan has officially once again been appointed as the judges for the second time. Mimicry Sethu and Ramya Subramanian as the hosts. Arjun was the Winner of this season, and the runner up is K. Manikandan.

Prize Winners:

- Winner: Arjun
- First Runner-Up: K. Manikandan

== Season 5 ==
Kalakka Povathu Yaaru? returned with its 5th season after 7 years. It began broadcasting on 26 July 2015 and finished on 14 August 2016 with 54 Episodes. The Judges are Thadi Balaji, Erode Mahesh, Mimicry Sethu, Aarthi, Madhumitha and Vijay TV anchor Priyanka Deshpande. Rakshan and Jacquline Lydia as the hosts. The title winner of Season 5 is Mohammed Kureshi and the runner up is Aranthangi Nisha.

Prize Winners:

- Winner: Mohamed Kuraishi
- First Runner-Up: Aranthangi Nisha

=== Competitors ===
Contestants	Result	Ref.
Mohammed Kuraishi	Winner	
Aranthangi Nisha	Runner-Up	
Anand Pandi	Eliminated	
Mullai	Eliminated	
Kothandam	Eliminated	
Sathish	Eliminated	
Naveen	Eliminated	
Sarath	Eliminated	
Dheena	Eliminated	
Palani	Eliminated	
Sujith	Eliminated	
Gabriella Sellus	Eliminated	
Ashraf	Eliminated	

== Season 6 ==
Kalakka Povathu Yaaru? returned with its 6th season. It began broadcasting on 21 August 2016 with Thadi Balaji, Erode Mahesh, Mimicry Sethu, Priyanka Deshpande and Aarthi as the judges with Rakshan and Jacquline Lydia has officially once again been appointed as the hosts for the second time. The title winners of Season 6 is Vinoth and Bala.

Prize Winners:

- Winner: Vinoth & Bala

=== Guest ===
- Santhanam

== Season 7 ==
The 7th season started on 1 October 2017. Erode Mahesh, Thadi Balaji, Mimicry Sethu, Priyanka Deshpande and Aarthi as the judges, with Rakshan and Jacquline Lydia as the hosts. The final episode was aired on 1 April 2018 and ended with 51 episodes. The winner of the season was Azhar and TSK.

Several guests that included in the grand finale are actor Silambarasan and Oviya.

Prize Winners:

- Winner: Azhar & TSK

== Season 8 ==
Kalakka Povathu Yaaru? 8 started on 19 January 2019 and finished on 15 June 2019 with 41 episodes on Star Vijay and was telecast on every Saturday and Sunday at 21:30 onwards. The Grand final episode was aired on 15 June 2019 on Saturday at 20:00. Thadi Balaji and Erode Mahesh as the hosts with Actress Kovai Sarala and Radha as the judges for this season. The title winner of Season 8 is Niranjana and the runner up is Mukesh and Monisha Blessy.

Prize Winners:

- Winner: Niranjana
- First Runners-Up: Mukesh & Monisha Blessy
- Best Entertainer: Ilayaraja and Madhubala

== Season 9 ==
The 9th season of the Kalakka Povathu Yaaru? show, premiered on 9 February 2020. The Judges are Ramya Pandian, Vanitha Vijayakumar, Erode Mahesh, Madurai Muthu and Aadhava (winner of KPY4). Azhar and Naveen as the hosts. The title winner of Season 9 is Jayachandran and the runner up is Giri and Shiva.

Several guests that included in the grand finale are actor Aranthangi Nisha, Robo Shankar, Yogi Babu and ‘Cooku with Comali’ star Pugazh as the special guests.

Prize Winners:

- Winner: Jayachandran
- First Runners-Up: Giri & Shiva
- Second Runners-Up: Micheal Augustine

== Season 10 ==
Kalakka Povathu Yaaru?
- Season 10
- Hosted by: Aranthangi Nisha; Vinoth Babu
- Judges: Pugazh; Madurai Muthu; Ramar; Amudhavanan
- No. of contestants: 10
- Winners: Nathiya & Saravanan
- No. of episodes: 19

Release
- Original network: Star Vijay
- Original release: 1 December 2024 – 30 April 2025

Kalakka Povathu Yaaru? Season 10, the tenth season of the Editing Kalakka Povathu Yaaru? show. It premiered on 1 December 2024 on every Sunday at 15:00 and ended on 30 April 2025 with 19 episodes. Aranthangi Nisha and Vinoth Babu are hosting the show for the first time. Pugazh, Madurai Muthu, Ramar and Amudhavanan as the judges for this season. The show is director and producer by D. Thomson under the produced by Dream Big Production. The season had Total 20 Contestants Participated.

The title winner of Season 10 is Nathiya and Saravanan and the runner up is Niranjan and Kapil.

Prize Winners:

- Winner: Nathiya and Saravanan; Rs 300,000
- First Runners-Up: Niranjan and Kapil; Rs 200,000

=== Contestants ===
#	Contestants	Result	Ref.
1	Nathiya & Saravanan	Winner	
2	Niranjan & Kapil	Runner-Up	
3	Vikcy & Lokesh	Finalist	
4	Praveen & Moses	Finalist	
5	Rajesh & Atchaya	Eliminated	
6	Sathiyaraj & Abinesh	Eliminated	
7	Roshini & Karthik	Eliminated	
8	Sathiyaraj & Abinash	Eliminated	
9	Murali & Kalaiyarasan	Eliminated	
10	Sibi & Rajkumar	Eliminated	

=== Episodes ===
Epi	Airing	Guest	Ref
1	1 December 2024	M. Sasikumar	
2	8 December 2024	Ashwin Kumar Lakshmikanthan	
3	15 December 2024	Attakathi Dinesh	
4	23 December 2024	Vemal	
5	29 December 2024	Shakeela	
6	5 January 2025	S. Ve. Shekher	
7	12 January 2025	Rio Raj	
8	2 February 2025	Namitha	
9	9 February 2025	Ganja Karuppu	
10	16 February 2025	Sathish	
11	23 February 2025	Rayan & Soundariya Nanjundan	
12	2 March 2025	Natty Subramaniam & Kavya	
13	9 March 2025	VJ Vishal & Muthukumaran Jegatheesan	
14	16 March 2025	Robo Shankar	
15	23 March 2025	Radha Ravi	
16	30 March 2025	Bharathiraja	
17	6 April 2025	Balaji Venugopal	
18	20 April 2025	Rakshan	
19	27 April 2025	Seeman	
