= Aranthangi Nisha =

Indian actress

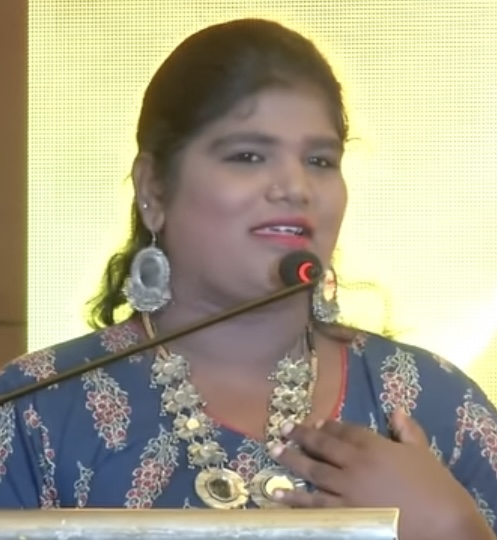
- Nisha at Maari 2 press meet (2018)
- Born: Nisa; 12 October 1987 (age 38); Aranthangi, Tamil Nadu, India
- Occupations: Actress; comedian; television personality
- Years active: 2015–present
- Spouse: Riaz Ali (m. 2010)
- Children: 2

Aranthangi Nisha (Tamil pronunciation: [aːɾaɳtaːɳɡiː ɳishaː]) (born 12 October 1987) is an Indian actress and comedian who predominantly works in Tamil film and television. She is known for appearing in films such as Maari 2 (2018), Aan Devathai and Thiruchitrambalam (2022). She has also performed in more than 800 stage shows as a comedian.

She has appeared in several different television shows such as Kalakka Povathu Yaaru (2015), Sagala vs Ragala (2018), Kalakka Povathu Yaaru Champions (2018), Ramar Veedu (2019), Mr And Mrs Chinnathirai (season 1) (2019), Cooku With Comali (2019–2020), Bigg Boss Tamil (season 4) (2020), BB Jodiagl (season 1) (2021), Comedy Raja Kalakkal Rani (2021), Star Kids (2021), Bharathi Kannamma (2021), Mr And Mrs Chinnathirai (season 4) (2022) and Vijay Sabhai (2022).

== Early life ==
Aranthangi Nisha was born on 12 October 1987 in Aranthangi, Pudukottai, Tamil Nadu. She loved to act and do comedy in her school days and childhood period.

== Career ==
Aranthangi Nisha made her television debut in 2015 on the Vijay TV's' comedy reality show Kalakka Povathu Yaaru? as a contestant. She successfully emerged as the 1st runner up of the show and received positive feedback for her talent in the show. After her appearance in the show she started to appear in films. She made her debut in the film Maari 2 in 2018 alongside actors Dhanush and Sai Pallavi playing the role as Attu Aanandi which received an overall positive reviews from critics and viewers who praised Nisha for her role in the film. She later appeared in various different films such as Irumbu Thirai (2018), Kolamaavu Kokila (2018) and Seemaraja (2018). She later returned to television hosted a various number of shows such as Mr and Mrs Chinnathirai (season 1) in 2019 and Cooku with Comali in 2020. Later in 2020, she appeared in the reality show Bigg Boss Tamil (season 4) as a contestant and was later evicted from the show on the 70th day. After her Bigg Boss experience she returned to films and acted in films like Hostel (2022), Thiruchitrambalam (2022) and Trigger (2022).

She appeared in the film Aneethi directed by Vasanthabalan, alongside actors Arjun Das and Dushara Vijayan.

== Social work ==
During Cyclone Michaung in 2023, she helped by providing supplies to the many people from Tiruchirappalli. Despite facing logistical issues in taking the aid materials to the people, she also prepared meals for around a thousand people but faced delays due to unpliable roads. She used her social media account to seek more help for Madipakkam, Pallikaranai and nearby areas.

== Filmography ==
=== Films ===
Key
†	Denotes films that have not yet been released

Year	Film	Role	Notes	Ref.
2018	Maari 2	Attu Aanandi		
2018	Irumbu Thirai	Rathi's patient		
2018	Kolamaavu Kokila	Guru's wife		
2018	Seemaraja	Herself	Special appearance	
2018	Aan Devathai	Herself		
2018	Kalakalappu 2	Ganesh's assistant		
2022	Hostel	“Burdha” Parvin (Ghost)		
2022	Thiruchitrambalam	Dhanalakshmi, Subbaraj's wife		
2022	Trigger	Revathi		
2023	Aneethi	Kalaimamani Nisha		
2023	Jailer	G. Kanagalakshmi		
2024	Saamaniyan	Kanaga		
2024	Raayan	Sargunam's assistant		
2026	Leader	Devi		

== Television ==
Year	Title	Role	Channel	Notes	Ref.
2015	Kalakka Povathu Yaaru? Season 5	Contestant	Star Vijay	1st Runner Up	
2024-2025	Kalakka Povathu Yaaru? Season 10	Host	Star Vijay		
2018	Sagala vs Ragala	Guest	Star Vijay		
2017–2023	Kalakka Povathu Yaaru? Champions	Contestant/ Host	Star Vijay	Contested in Seasons 1, 2 and 3 Co-hosted Season 4 alongside KPY Bala	
2019	Ramar Veedu	Ammu/ Ramar's wife	Star Vijay	Main Cast	
2019	Mr And Mrs Chinnathirai (season 1)	Contestant	Star Vijay	Finalist	
2019–2020	Cooku With Comali (season 1)	Host	Star Vijay		
2019–2022	Mr and Mrs Chinnathirai (season 2-4)	Host	Star Vijay		
2020	Bigg Boss Tamil (season 4)	Contestant	Star Vijay	Evicted Day 70	
2021	BB Jodigal (season 1)	Contestant	Star Vijay	Finalist	
2021	Bigg Boss Kondattam	Guest	Star Vijay		
2021	Comedy Raja Kalakkal Rani	Contestant	Star Vijay	Paired with Raju Jeyamohan; Quitted show	
2021	Star Kids	Guest	Star Vijay	Special show	
2021	Bharathi Kannamma	Vadivukkarasi	Star Vijay	Tamil TV Serial	
2022	Vijay Sabhai	Devasena	Star Vijay	Special show	
2022	Happy Birthday Kamal Haasan	Guest	Star Vijay	Special show Birthday show dedicated to actor Kamal Haasan	
2024	Cooku with Comali season 5	Comali	Star Vijay		
2024	Mr and Mrs Chinnathirai season 5	Host	Star Vijay		
2026	Happy Wife Happy Life	Guest	Star Vijay		
2026	Cooku with Comali season 7	Contestant	Star Vijay	Eliminated episode 12	

== Awards ==
Year	Cateogary	Awards	Notes
2019	Best Comedian female non fiction	Vijay Awards	
