= KPY Bala =

Indian actor and comedian (born 1995)

- Born: Balan Aakash Balaiyan Jaganathan; 30 June 1995 (age 31); Karaikal, Puducherry, India
- Occupations: Actor; comedian
- Known for: Kalakka Povathu Yaaru? Champions, Cooku With Comali

KPY Bala (born 30 June 1995) is an Indian actor and comedian, who works in Tamil-language films and television. He rose to fame after appearing on Star Vijay's Cooku with Comali.

== Personal life ==
Bala was born on 30 June 1995 in Karaikal, India.

== Career ==
He received support from Amuthavaanan whilst coming to Chennai and started looking for opportunities in Vijay TV shows such as Athu Ithu Ethu.

In 2017, he competed in Kalakka Povadhu Yaaru? Season 6 and won the show, after having been eliminated and saved by Priyanka Deshpande, who advocated for him to continue on the show. He was seen occasionally on Super Singer 7, providing comedic relief, this led to him being roped into a Comali for Cooku with Comali.

His first notable role was in Vijay Sethupathi's Junga, directed by Gokul.

== Philanthropy ==
During the audio launch of Rudhran, which Bala was anchoring, Raghava Lawrence had given Bala 10 lakhs to help with his welfare fund.

In 2023, Bala bought an ambulance for the hill dwellers of Kadambur near Erode. Earlier, on his birthday, he donated an ambulance to an old-age home.

== Filmography ==
=== Films ===
List of Bala film credits
Year	Film	Role	Notes
2018	Sila Samayangalil	Card betting game player	
2018	Junga	Poetu Dinesh	
2019	Thumbaa	Suresh	
2019	Sixer	Dokku	
2020	Cocktail	Pandi	
2021	Pulikkuthi Pandi	Pandi's friend	
2021	Laabam	Tabla player	
2021	Friendship	Vettukili	
2021	Anti Indian	Shamiana Boy	
2022	Naai Sekar	Colour Sattai	
2022	Dejavu		
2022	Kanam	Paandi's assistant	
2022	Repeat Shoe	Maari's sidekick	
2022	Naai Sekar Returns	Singadurai	
2022	Oh My Ghost	Witchcraft	
2023	Beginning	Bruce Lee	
2023	Ghosty		
2023	Run Baby Run	Drunkard	
2023	Single Shankarum Smartphone Simranum	Raja	
2023	Dhillu Irundha Poradu		
2023	Ra Ra Sarasukku Ra Ra		
2023	Paatti Sollai Thattathe		
2024	Boomer Uncle	Billu	
2024	Nanban Oruvan Vantha Piragu	Karthi	
2024	Dhil Raja		
2024	Thiru.Manickam	Himself	Cameo appearance
2025	Gandhi Kannadi	Kathir	Debut film as leading actor

=== Television ===
List of Bala Television credits
Year	Title	Season	Role	Platform	Notes	Ref.
2017	Kalakka Povadhu Yaaru?	Season 6	Contestant	Star Vijay	Winner along with KPY Vinoth	
2019	Super Singer	Season 7	Self/Guest	Star Vijay		
2019-22	Cooku with Comali	Season 1	Self/Comali	Star Vijay		
2019-22	Cooku with Comali	Season 2	Self/Comali	Star Vijay		
2019-22	Cooku with Comali	Season 3	Self/Comali	Star Vijay	Won ₹1,00,000 as co-Comali for Winner (Shrutika), whom donated ₹1,00,000 of her winnings, as did his co-Comali Pugazh.	
2020	Morattu Single	Season 1	Self/Guest	Star Vijay		
2021	Super Singer	Season 8	Self/Guest	Star Vijay		
2021	Mr and Mrs Chinnathirai	Season 3	Self	Star Vijay	Participated with Sunitha for dance performance.	
2021	Comedy Raja Kalakkal Rani	Season 1	Contestant	Star Vijay	Paired with Rithika, came second.	
2022-2023	Anda Ka Kasam	Season 1	Contestant	Star Vijay	Episode 2 and Episode 25	
2022	Oo Solriya Oo Oohm Solriya	Season 1	Contestant	Star Vijay	Episode 5	
2023	Kalakka Povathu Yaaru? Champions	Season 3	Contestant	Star Vijay	Doubles Season - Paired with KPY Vinoth	
2023	Kalakka Povathu Yaaru? Champions	Season 4	Co-Host	Star Vijay		
2023	Kadhanayagi	Season 1	Co-Host	Star Vijay	Episodes 1–4	

=== Music videos ===
List of Bala Music Video credits
Year	Song	Artists
2021	"Kannamma Eannamma"	Sam Vishal
2021	"No No No"	Sivaangi Krishnakumar

== Accolades ==
Year	Award	Category	Result	Ref.
2022	Vijay Television Awards	Best Comedian	Won	
