= Pulivaal =

2014 Indian film by G. Marimuthu

- Theatrical release poster
- Directed by: G. Marimuthu
- Story by: Sameer Thahir
- Produced by: Radhika; Listin Stephen
- Starring: Vimal; Prasanna; Oviya; Ananya; Ineya
- Cinematography: Bhojan K. Dinesh
- Edited by: Kishore Te.
- Music by: N. R. Raghunanthan
- Production company: Magic Frames
- Release date: 7 February 2014
- Country: India
- Language: Tamil

Pulivaal (transl. Tail of the Tiger) is a 2014 Indian Tamil-language comedy thriller film directed by G. Marimuthu, and produced by Sarath Kumar and Listin Stephen. It stars Vimal, Prasanna, Oviya, Ananya, and Ineya. The film is a remake of the 2011 Malayalam film Chaappa Kurishu which itself was an adaptation of the 2009 South Korean film Handphone. It started production in March 2013 and released on 7 February 2014. Pulivaal is Marimuthu's final directorial before his death in 2023.

== Plot ==
The film revolves around two men who are poles apart in their lifestyles.

Initially, we see Kasi, a Madurai based youth who lives at Besant Nagar in Chennai with his colleague. He works in a supermarket and earns only 3500 per month. He is in love with Selvi, a young girl who also works in the same supermarket, and they always hang out together. He has a close friend Chokkalingam. Valliappan, their manager always ill-treats Kasi even though he is very good-natured.

Then, we get introduced to Karthik, a rich businessman who is in a relationship with his colleague Monica. Unknown to Monica, his fiancee, Pavithra, is in love with him. Karthik's phone contains a few sex videos with Monica, and it reaches Kasi during an argument between Karthik and Monica at a nearby highway coffee shop when she finds out that he is engaged to Pavithra.

Kasi hides Karthik’s phone and uses Karthik to solve his problems with Valliappan. When Selvi finds out that Karthik's phone is with Kasi, she tells him to give it back otherwise, she will not talk with him forever. Kasi repents and tells Karthik that he will return the phone very soon. When Kasi tells his location to Karthik, the phone's battery is dead. Kasi gives the phone to his friend, CD Chandran, a mobile shop owner to charge it. He finds the sex videos and uploads them on YouTube and exposes them without Kasi's knowledge. When Karthik sees it, he thinks that Kasi has uploaded it, and Karthik decides to seek revenge, by killing him. Monica tries to commit suicide thinking that Karthik exposed their affair to the world, and she gets hospitalised. Kasi learns from his other friend that the videos have been uploaded on YouTube when he gave the phone to charge and that Karthik believes he uploaded it, hence Karthik will kill him. Karthik follows Valliappan and finds Kasi in the supermarket, and a chase occurs between them. Karthik beats Kasi very badly, and Kasi retaliates in frustration. Both get heavily injured, and Kasi reveals that he didn't post the videos on YouTube. He goes to Chandran's shop with Karthik and they both thrash him to death.

Karthik goes to the hospital to meet Monica, and they both reconcile. She gets discharged from the hospital, and Karthik takes care of her. Kasi comes to meet him with Selvi with some fruits and medicines. Karthik gives his phone to Kasi and tells him to keep it, as a heart-touching sign of treating a poor person with respect and affection.

== Cast ==
- Vimal as Kasi
- Prasanna as Karthik
- Oviya as Monica
- Ananya as Selvi
- Ineya as Pavithra
- Soori as Chokku
- Swarnamalya as Bindu
- Thambi Ramiah as Valliappan
- Prem as Gowtham
- Rekha Suresh as Pavithra's mother
- Niranjini Aggarwal
- Singamuthu
- Nakshathra Nagesh as Monica's friend
- Mimicry Sethu as CD Chandran
- Badava Gopi as iPhone service person

== Soundtrack ==
Music is composed by N. R. Raghunanthan.

- "Neelangaraiyil" – Karthik, Saindhavi (Lyrics: Vairamuthu)
- "Kichu Kichu" – Haricharan, Anitha Karthikeyan
- "Naadu Naadu" – Madhu Balakrishnan
- "Netrum Party" – Tippu, Ranina Reddy
- "Vaazhkai Unnai" – Hariharasudhan

== Release and reception ==
The satellite rights of the film were sold to Sun TV.

Sify wrote, "somehow the wafer thin story of Puli Vaal and its making leaves you cold and detached. Everything looks too manipulative, and the look and feel do not have a local nativity. The ending is also a tame affair". Behindwoods gave it 2 stars out of 5 and wrote, "director Marimuthu allows the plot play out like a game with lifeless thrills, and whenever he does manage to build suspense he breaks it down with narratives that are tangential to the story". Indiaglitz gave it 3 stars out of 5 and wrote, "But for a few minor glitches...Pulivaal is "a highly entertaining movie". Cinemalead's Siddarth Srinivas loathed the film, rating it 1.5 stars on 5. Baradwaj Rangan from The Hindu wrote "At the heart of Pulivaal, adapted from the Malayalam film Chaappa Kurishu, is the grim truth that we cannot control life, and that the things we do can sometimes spiral into disastrous consequences for innocents."
