= Chennai Kadhal =

- DVD cover
- Directed by: Vikraman
- Written by: Vikraman
- Produced by: Kalaipuli S. Thanu
- Starring: Bharath; Genelia
- Cinematography: Muthu Ganesh
- Edited by: Anthony
- Music by: Joshua Sridhar
- Production company: V Creations
- Release date: 8 December 2006
- Running time: 130 minutes
- Country: India
- Language: Tamil

Chennai Kadhal (transl. Chennai Love) is a 2006 Indian Tamil-language romantic comedy film written and directed by Vikraman, and produced by Kalaipuli S. Thanu. The film stars Bharath and Genelia in the lead roles. The score and soundtrack are composed by Joshua Sridhar.

Chennai Kadhal released on 8 December 2006 and became a box office failure.

== Plot ==
Gautham, a college drop-out and good-for-nothing guy, falls in love with Narmada, the daughter of a local don Sakthivel. She lives in a hostel after learning that her father is a criminal who now wants her to marry his partner Sardar's brother. So the two lovers elope to Mumbai, and they are soon tracked and separated. Finally, Gautham, along with his friends, fights against all odds to win back Narmada.

== Cast ==
- Bharath as Gautham
- Genelia as Narmada
- Radha Ravi as Sakthivel (Narmada's father)
- Dharmapuram Subramanyam as Gautham's father (voice dubbed by Anu Mohan)
- Brahmaji as Sardar
- Sumithra as Gautham's mother
- Kovai Guna as Guna
- Chutti Aravind as Gautham's friend
- Shyam Ganesh as Sardar's friend
- Sriranjani as Narmada's mother
- Imman Annachi as Black Ticket Seller
- Robo Shankar as Police Inspector

Uncredited

- Jaguar Thangam as himself
- Bonda Mani as Rowdy Rangan

== Production ==
Unlike his previous ventures which were primarily family dramas, Chennai Kadhal was described by Vikraman as his "first attempt at reaching the youth".

== Soundtrack ==
Soundtrack was composed by Joshua Sridhar and lyrics were written by Pa. Vijay, Na. Muthukumar and Viveka.

Song	Singers	Length
"Enjoy Idhu"	Ranjith	03:48
"Angel Angel"	Karthik, Sunitha Sarathy	05:05
"Silusilukkum"	Naresh Iyer, Kalpana Raghavendar	02:23
"Thimre Thimire"	Sriram Parthasarathy, Sweta Mohan	04:42
"Salladai"	Karthik, Swetha Mohan	03:30
"Rendanjaamam"	Hariharan, Sangeetha	04:19

== Critical reception ==
Malathi Rangarajan of The Hindu wrote, "It is as though Vikraman, angered by the lukewarm response to his earlier family drama, has gone all out to fill up the film with formula stuff. Only that he goes overboard. The director could have stuck to family themes. At least it is known territory. `Chennai Kaadhal' is just old wine in worn out bottle". Sify wrote, "Director Vikraman has made a deliberate attempt to deviate from his usual formula and it has succeeded to a certain extent though the story, presentation and even dialogues are so predictable. The main problem lies with its script which has nothing new to offer and the love between the lead pair is so artificial has no life in it".

Sriram Iyer of Rediff.com wrote "The movie is director Vikraman's supposed attempt to make something different. It is surely not one of his usual slow paced dramas, but that alone is not enough to make it 'different,' by any standards. He has chosen a plot older than a heavily worn out doormat". Lajjavathi of Kalki wrote Vikraman made a film different from family dramas however he did not move an inch away from formula calling the story routine and felt this film made tired of watching films with same formula. She praised the performance of Bharath, humour of Bharath's father and Muthu Ganesh's cinematography and concluded saying there are other directors who make such stories but there were only a few people like Vikraman who were able to play swings due to their feelings, with this film, Vikraman moved away from that line and requested Vikraman to do give a film in his style so that it will stay forever like the sky (a pun on his film Vaanathaippola, where the title means "like the sky"). Malini Mannath of Chennai Online wrote "Chennai Kadhal is a film that tests your endurance level the way a Vikraman film has never done before!"
