= Cooku with Comali season 5 =

Cooku With Comali
- Season 5
- Hosted by: Rakshan; Manimegalai (Upto Week 21)
- Judges: Chef Damu; Madhampatty Rangaraj
- No. of contestants: 10
- Winner: Priyanka Deshpande
- Runner-up: Sujitha Dhanush

Release
- Original network: Star Vijay
- Original release: 27 April – 29 September 2024

Season chronology
- ← Previous; Season 4 Next → Season 6

Cooku with Comali 5 is the fifth season of the Tamil reality cooking TV show Cooku with Comali. It premiered on Star Vijay on 17 April 2024, and aired on every Saturday and Sunday at 21:30. Chef Damu returned to judged, accompanied by the new Madhampatty Rangaraj. The final episode aired on 29 September 2024. The season was won by television presenter Priyanka Deshpande, and the runner-up was actress Sujitha.

== Contestants (cooks) ==
S.No.	Name	Entry episode	Episode exited	Elimination rounds faced	Immunity won	Saturday cooking winner	Advantage round	Chef of the week	Status
1	Priyanka Deshpande	Episode 1	Episode 46	—N/a		2	4	7	Winner
2	Sujitha	Episode 1	Episode 46	—N/a	1	1	5	7	Runner-up
3	Irfan	Episode 1	Episode 46	2	—N/a	2	4	4	Finalist
4	Pooja Venkat	Episode 1	Episode 32	2	—N/a	1	2	3	Eliminated
4	Pooja Venkat	Episode 43	Episode 46	2	—N/a	1	2	3	Finalist
5	Shaalin Zoya	Episode 1	Episode 28	2	—N/a	1	—N/a	1	Eliminated
5	Shaalin Zoya	Episode 29 (Guest)	—N/a	2	—N/a	1	—N/a	1	—N/a
5	Shaalin Zoya	Episode 43	Episode 46	2	—N/a	1	—N/a	1	Finalist
6	VTV Ganesh	Episode 1	Episode 40	2	—N/a	1	1	3	Eliminated
6	VTV Ganesh	Episode 43	Episode 46	2	—N/a	1	1	3	Finalist
7	Akshay Kamal	Episode 1	Episode 42	4	—N/a	3	3	2	Eliminated
7	Akshay Kamal	Episode 43	Episode 45	4	—N/a	3	3	2	Eliminated
8	Vasanth Vasi	Episode 1	Episode 18	1	—N/a		1	1	Eliminated
8	Vasanth Vasi	Episode 43	Episode 45	1	—N/a		1	1	Eliminated
9	Dhivya Duraisamy	Episode 1	Episode 40	1	—N/a	2	—N/a	3	Eliminated
10	Srikanth Deva	Episode 1	Episode 8	1	—N/a				Eliminated

== Comalis ==
S. No.	Name	Entry Week	Participated Week	Status
01	Sunita Gogoi	Week 1	Week 1-23	Main Comali
02	Sarath	Week 1	Week 1-20, 23	Main Comali
03	Mohamed Kuraishi	Week 1	Week 1-2, 4-23	Main Comali
04	Ramar	Week 1	Week 1, 3-5, 7-23	Main Comali
05	Thangadurai	Week 2	Week 2-12, 14, 16-18, 20, 23	Main Comali
06	Pugazh	Week 1	Week 1-9, 12-21, 23	Main Comali
07	Anshitha Akbarsha	Week 1	Week 1-9, 11-14, 16, 18	Main Comali
08	Vyshali Kemkar	Week 1	Week 1-15, 18	Main Comali
09	Thidiyan	Week 2	Week 2, 3, 18	Guest Comali
10	TSK	Week 3	Week 3, 18	Guest Comali
11	Aranthangi Nisha	Week 8	Week 8, 13	Guest Comali
12	Azhar	Week 11	Week 11	Guest Comali
13	Robo Shankar	Week 10	Week 10	Guest Comali
14	Farina Azad	Week 3	Week 3, 4, 6, 7, 9	Guest Comali
15	Shabi Shabnam	Week 1	Week 1, 2, 5, 6	Guest Comali
16	Vinoth	Week 1	Week 1, 2, 4	Guest Comali
17	Manimegalai	Week 6	Week 6	Guest Comali/Anchor/Quit the Show
18	Nanjil Vijayan	Week 1	Week 1	Quit the Show

== Guests ==
Week	Episodes	Guests	Ref.
1	2	Vanitha Vijayakumar, Vidyullekha Raman	
3	5	Subramaniam Badrinath, Lakshmipathy Balaji	
4	7 & 8	Radha	
7	14	Madurai Muthu	
8	15 & 16	Vijay Sethupathi, Mamta Mohandas, Natty Subramaniam	
9	18	Raj Ayyappa, Ayesha Zeenath, Naveen Muralidhar, Ashwini Aanandita, Deepika Venkatachalam, Krishna Raghunandhan	
10	19 & 20	Robo Shankar	
11	21 & 22	Mirchi Shiva, Aruldoss	
12	23	M. Sasikumar, RJ Balaji, Laila, Napoleon, Gautham Karthik, Thaman S, Anjali, Aishwarya Rajesh - (Cameo appearances)	
14	27 & 28	Vijay Antony, Saranya Ponvannan	
16	31 & 32	Prashanth, Priya Anand	
18	35	Mari Selvaraj, Dhivya Duraisamy	
18	35 & 36	VJ Vishal, Vanitha Vijayakumar, Sivaangi Krishnakumar, Baba Bhaskar, Shakeela Begum	
19	37	Yogi	
19	38	Nani, Priyanka Mohan	
21	41	Harish Kalyan, Sanjana Krishnamoorthy, Swasika, Sean Roldan	
21	41 & 42	Shobanaa Uthaman, Sharanya Turadi Sundarraj, Navin Kumar, Vinusha Devi	
22	43 & 44	Hiphop Tamizha (Adhi), Anagha Maruthora	
22	44	Shaam, Abhirami Gopikumar, Avantika Mishra, Pugazh	
22	45	Madhampatty Rangaraj, Latha R.Maniyarasu	
23	46	Radha	
23	46	Karthi, Arvind Swamy	

== Pairings ==
Cooks	Week 1	Week 2	Week 3	Week 4	Week 5	Week 6	Week 7	Week 8	Week 9	Week 10	Week 11	Week 12	Week 13	Week 14	Week 15	Week 16	Week 17	Week 18	Week 19	Week 20	Week 21	Week 22	Week 23 Grand Finale
Priyanka	Vinoth	Shabnam/Pugazh	Ramar	Anshita	Pugazh	Kemy/Farina	Sunitha	Ramar	Sarath	Kemy	Azhar	Thangadurai	Ramar/Kuraishi	Thangadurai	Pugazh	Thangadurai	Kuraishi/Sunitha	TSK	Sunitha/Pugazh	Kuraishi	Ramar & Vinusha	2nd Finalist	Kuraishi/Ramar
Sujitha	Sarath	Kemy	Kemy/Pugazh	Kuraishi	Ramar	Thangadurai	Kemy	Anshita	Kemy	Ramar	Sarath	Pugazh/Sunitha	Pugazh	Kemy	Sunitha	Sarath	Pugazh	Not Participated	Sarath	Sunitha	Pugazh & Navin	1st Finalist	Pugazh
Irfan	Anshita	Sarath	Farina	Pugazh	Thangadurai	Anshita	Kuraishi	Nisha	Kuraishi	Sunitha	Thangadurai	Sarath	Kemy	Ramar	Not Participated	Anshita	Sunitha/Kuraishi	Kemy	Kuraishi	Sarath	Kuraishi & Sharanya	3rd Finalist	Thangadurai/Sarath
Pooja	Kemy	Vinoth	Sunitha	Farina	Sarath	Sarath	Ramar	Thangadurai	Anshita	Thangadurai	Kuraishi	Sunitha/Pugazh	Anshita	Sunitha	Kuraishi/Ramar	Sunitha	Eliminated (Episode 32)					Kuraishi; 4th Finalist	Sarath/Kuraishi
Shaalin	Kuraishi	Thangadurai	TSK	Kemy	Sunitha	Pugazh	Anshita	Sarath	Ramar	Not Participated	Anshita	Kemy	Kuraishi/Ramar	Sarath	Eliminated (Episode 28)							Sarath; 5th Finalist	Sunitha
Ganesh	Pugazh	Pugazh/Shabnam	Thidiyan	Ramar	Kuraishi/Shabnam	Kuraishi	Farina	Pugazh	Thangadurai	Kuraishi	Kemy	Ramar	Nisha	Pugazh	Ramar/Kuraishi	Ramar	Thangadurai	Ramar		Ramar	Eliminated (Episode 40)	Ramar; 6th Finalist	Ramar/Thangadurai
Akshay	Shabnam	Sunitha	Anshita	Sarath	Shabnam/Kuraishi	Farina/Kemy	Thangadurai	Sunitha	Pugazh	Sarath	Sunitha	Kuraishi	Sarath	Anshita	Kemy	Pugazh	Ramar	Thidiyan	Pugazh/Sunitha	Pugazh	Sunitha & Shobanaa	Sunitha	Eliminated (Episode 45)
Vasanth	Vijayan	Thidiyan	Sarath	Vinoth	Kemy	Shabnam/Manimegalai	Pugazh	Kemy	Farina	Eliminated (Episode 18)												Thangadurai	Eliminated (Episode 45)
Dhivya	Ramar	Kuraishi	Pugazh/Kemy	Thangadurai	Anshita	Sunitha	Sarath	Kuraishi	Sunitha	Shankar	Ramar	Anshita	Sunitha	Kuraishi	Sarath	Kuraishi	Sarath		Not Participated	Thangadurai	Eliminated (Episode 40)		
Srikanth	Sunitha	Anshita	Thangadurai	Sunitha	Eliminated (Episode 8)																		

== Pairing Matrix ==
Cooks	Pugazh	Kuraishi	Ramar	SunitaGogoi	SarathRaj	Thangadurai	Anshitha	Kemkar	Farina	Shabnam	Thidiyan	TSK	Nisha	Azhar	Robo Shankar	Vinoth	Manimegalai	Nanjil Vijayan
Sujitha	6 Week 3 (2/2); Week 12 (1/2); Week 13; Week 17; Week 21; Week 23	1 Week 4	2 Week 5 Week 10	3 Week 12 (2/2); Week 15; Week 20	4 Week 1 Week 11; Week 16; Week 19	1 Week 6	1 Week 8	5 Week 2 Week 3 (1/2); Week 7 Week 9 Week 14	—N/a	—N/a	—N/a	—N/a	—N/a	—N/a	—N/a	—N/a	—N/a	—N/a
Mohamed Irfan	1 Week 4	5 Week 7 Week 9 Week 17 (2/2); Week 19; Week 21	1 Week 14	2 Week 10; Week 17 (1/2)	4 Week 2 Week 12; Week 20; Week 23 (2/2)	3 Week 5 Week 11; Week 23 (1/2)	3 Week 1 Week 6 Week 16	2 Week 13; Week 18	1 Week 3	—N/a	—N/a	—N/a	1 Week 8	—N/a	—N/a	—N/a	—N/a	—N/a
Priyanka Deshpande	4 Week 2 (2/2); Week 5 Week 15; Week 19 (2/2)	4 Week 13 (2/2); Week 17 (1/2); Week 20; Week 23 (1/2)	5 Week 3 Week 8 Week 13 (1/2); Week 21; Week 23 (2/2)	3 Week 7 Week 17 (2/2); Week 19 (1/2)	1 Week 9	3 Week 12; Week 14; Week 16	1 Week 4	2 Week 6 (1/2); Week 10	1 Week 6 (2/2)	1 Week 2 (1/2)	—N/a	1 Week 18	—N/a	1 Week 11	—N/a	1 Week 1	—N/a	—N/a
Pooja Venkat	1 Week 12 (2/2)	4 Week 11; Week 15 (1/2); Week 22; Week 23 (2/2)	2 Week 7 Week 15 (2/2)	4 Week 3 Week 12 (1/2); Week 14; Week 16	3 Week 5 Week 6 Week 23 (1/2)	2 Week 8 Week 10	2 Week 9 Week 13	1 Week 1	1 Week 4	—N/a	—N/a	—N/a	—N/a	—N/a	—N/a	1 Week 2	—N/a	—N/a
Shaalin Zoya	1 Week 6	2 Week 1 Week 13 (1/2)	2 Week 9 Week 13 (2/2)	2 Week 5 Week 23	3 Week 8 Week 14; Week 22	1 Week 2	2 Week 7 Week 11	2 Week 4 Week 12	—N/a	—N/a	—N/a	1 Week 3	—N/a	—N/a	—N/a	—N/a	—N/a	—N/a
VTV Ganesh	4 Week 1 Week 2 (1/2); Week 8 Week 14	4 Week 5 (1/2); Week 6 Week 10; Week 15 (2/2)	9 Week 4 Week 12; Week 15 (1/2); Week 16; Week 18; Week 19; Week 20; Week 22; Week 23 (1/2)	—N/a	—N/a	1 Week 9 Week 17; Week 23 (2/2)	—N/a	1 Week 11	1 Week 7	1 Week 2 (2/2); Week 5 (2/2)	1 Week 3	—N/a	1 Week 13	—N/a	—N/a	—N/a	—N/a	—N/a
Akshay Kamal	4 Week 9 Week 16; Week 19 (1/2); Week 20	2 Week 5 (2/2); Week 12	1 Week 17	6 Week 2 Week 8 Week 11; Week 19 (2/2); Week 21; Week 22	3 Week 4 Week 10; Week 13	1 Week 7	2 Week 3 Week 14	2 Week 6 (2/2); Week 15	1 Week 6 (1/2)	2 Week 1 Week 5 (1/2)	1 Week 18	—N/a	—N/a	—N/a	—N/a	—N/a	—N/a	—N/a

== Elimination history ==
WEEKS	Week 1	Week 2	Week 3	Week 4	Week 5	Week 6	Week 7	Week 8	Week 9	Week 10	Week 11	Week 12	Week 13	Week 14	Week 15	Week 16	Week 17	Week 18	Week 19	Week 20	Week 21	Week 22	Week 23 Grand Finale		
Chef of the week	Sujitha	Dhivya	Vasanth	Akshay	Irfan	Priyanka	Sujitha	Sujitha & Priyanka	Sujitha	Akshay, Dhivya, Ganesh, Irfan, Pooja, Priyanka & Sujitha	Pooja	Priyanka	Dhivya	Priyanka	Ganesh	Priyanka	Sujitha	Vishal (CWC S4)	Irfan		Sujitha	Pooja, Shaalin & Ganesh	Priyanka		
Advantage Winner	NA	Sujitha & Priyanka	Akshay	Irfan	None	Priyanka	Ganesh	Sujitha		Priyanka	Pooja		Akshay	Irfan	Sujitha	Priyanka	Irfan	Akshay	Sujitha		Irfan	Vasanth	NA		
Immunity Winner	None																Sujitha	None							
Priyanka	Not Eligible	Advantage Winner	Not Eligible			Advantage winner Chef of the week	Not Eligible	Chef of the week	Not Eligible	Not Eligible	Chef of the week	Not Eligible	Chef of the week	Not Eligible	Advantage winner Chef of the week	Not Eligible						2nd Finalist	Winner		
Sujitha	Chef of the week	Advantage Winner	Not Eligible				Chef of the week	Advantage Winner; Chef of the week		Chef of the week	Not Eligible				Advantage Winner	Not Eligible	Chef of the week Immunity Winner	Not Participated	Advantage Winner		Chef of the week	1st Finalist	Runner-up		
Irfan	Not Eligible			Advantage Winner	Chef of the week	Not Eligible				Chef of the week	Not Eligible			Advantage Winner	Not participated Danger Zone	Faced Elimination Round	Advantage Winner	Danger Zone	Chef of the week		Advantage Winner	3rd Finalist	Finalist		
Pooja	Not Eligible					Danger Zone			Faced Elimination Round	Chef of the week	Advantage winner Chef of the week	Advantage Winner	Not Eligible			Danger Zone; Faced Elimination Round	Eliminated (Episode 32)					Wildcard round Chef of the week 4th Finalist	Finalist		
Shaalin	Not Eligible		Danger Zone	Faced Elimination Round	Not Eligible					Chef of the week	Not Eligible		Danger Zone	Faced Elimination Round	Eliminated (Episode 28)							Wildcard round Chef of the week 5th Finalist	Finalist		
Ganesh	Not Eligible						Advantage Winner	Not Eligible		Chef of the week	Danger Zone			Faced Elimination Round	Chef of the week	Not Eligible	Danger Zone			Danger Zone; Faced Elimination Round	Eliminated (Episode 40)	Wildcard round Chef of the week 6th Finalist	Finalist		
Akshay	Not Eligible		Advantage Winner	Chef of the week	Not Eligible			Danger Zone	Faced Elimination Round	Chef of the week	Not Eligible	Danger Zone	Advantage Winner; Danger Zone	Faced Elimination Round	Danger Zone	Faced Elimination Round	Not Eligible	Advantage Winner; Danger Zone	Not Eligible		Eliminated (Episode 42)	Wildcard round	Eliminated (Episode 45)		
Vasanth	Not Eligible		Chef of the week	Not Eligible			Danger Zone		Faced Elimination Round	Chef of the week	Eliminated (Episode 18)											Wildcard round	Eliminated (Episode 45)		
Dhivya	Not Eligible	Chef of the week	Not Eligible							Chef of the week	Not Eligible		Chef of the week	Not Eligible					Not Participated; Danger Zone	Danger Zone; Faced Elimination Round	Eliminated (Episode 40)				
Srikanth	Not Eligible		Danger Zone	Faced Elimination Round	Eliminated (Episode 8)																				
Re-Entered/ Wildcard Round	None																					Vasanth, Shaalin, Pooja, Ganesh & Akshay	None		
Danger Zone	None		Shaalin & Srikanth	None		Pooja	Pooja & Vasanth	Pooja, Vasanth & Akshay	None		Ganesh	Ganesh & Akshay	Ganesh, Akshay & Shaalin	None	Akshay & Irfan	Akshay, Irfan & Pooja	Ganesh	Ganesh, Irfan & Akshay	Ganesh, Dhivya	Ganesh, Dhivya	None				
Faced Elimination Round	None			Shaalin, Srikanth	None				Pooja, Vasanth, Akshay	None				Ganesh, Akshay, Shaalin	None	Akshay, Irfan, Pooja	None			Ganesh, Dhivya	None		Priyanka, Ganesh, Irfan, Pooja, Shaalin, Sujitha		
Eliminated	None			Srikanth	None				Vasanth	None				Shaalin	None	Pooja	None			Dhivya & Ganesh	Akshay	Vasanth & Akshay	Shaalin	Ganesh	Irfan
Eliminated	None			Srikanth	None				Vasanth	None				Shaalin	None	Pooja	None			Dhivya & Ganesh	Akshay	Vasanth & Akshay	Pooja	Sujitha	
Eliminated	None			Srikanth	None				Vasanth	None				Shaalin	None	Pooja	None			Dhivya & Ganesh	Akshay	Vasanth & Akshay	Priyanka		

== Production ==
=== Development ===
While the show had previously been produced by Media Masons, production on the fifth season was taken over by Box Office Studio. The format largely went unchanged, though there were changes in the judging panel; Chef Damu returned, but Venkatesh Bhat left and was replaced by Madhampatty Rangaraj.

=== Casting ===
The previous year's contestans Pugazh, Sunitha Gogoi, Mohamed Kuraishi, Kpy Sarath returned to compete in the show; they were joined by newcomers Ramar, Shabishabnam, Nanjil Vijayan, Anshita Akbarsha and Vyishali Kemkar.

Contestant and comedian Nanjil Vijayan quit the show after the first week, later announcing on his social media that he had " problem with the channel, and after this, [he] will not appear in any show produced by the box office company." On 15 June 2024, actress Aranthangi Nisha joined the show.

=== Release ===
The show started airing on Star Vijay on 27 April 2024.
