= Sooriya Nagaram =

2012 Indian film by M. Sellamuthu

- Directed by: M. Sellamuthu
- Written by: M. Sellamuthu
- Produced by: X. B. Rajan
- Starring: Rahul Ravindran; Meera Nandan
- Cinematography: J. K. Venky
- Edited by: S. Surajkavee
- Music by: Ron Ethan Yohann
- Production company: AV Screens
- Release date: 30 March 2012
- Country: India
- Language: Tamil

Sooriya Nagaram (transl. Sun City) is a 2012 Indian Tamil-language romance film written and directed by M. Sellamuthu and produced by X. B. Rajan. The film stars Rahul Ravindran and Meera Nandan. This was the debut film of music composer Ron Ethan Yohann (credited as Fen Viallee). The film was released on 30 March 2012, and was moderately received.

== Plot ==
A caste-obsessed society causes the death of a young women and her lover at the hands of her own brother.

== Cast ==
- Rahul Ravindran as Vetrivel
- Meera Nandan as Thamizhselvi
- Udhay as adult Senthil
- Master Sishil as young Senthil
- Ganja Karuppu
- Soori as Mechanic
- Manobala
- Anjathe Sridhar as Maari
- S. N. Lakshmi
- Kovai Guna
- R. V. Udayakumar as Kathirvel

== Soundtrack ==
The soundtrack was composed by debutante Fen Viallee, and all the lyrics were written by Vairamuthu. Think Music India holds the audio rights.

- "Manmadha Kadhal" — Karthik, Sujatha
- "Kalyanamaam" — Karthik
- "Kichu Kichu" — Chinmayi
- "Unnai Pirivena" – Karthik, Chinmayi
- "Selladhe Jeevane" – S. P. Balasubrahmanyam, K. S. Chithra

== Reception ==
The Hindu wrote "The story and the screenplay are to be largely blamed for the film's failure to strike a chord with the audience. The whole plot is stretched to such an extent that by the time the film ends, one feels drained and exhausted". The Times of India criticised the film of being overly derivative of the numerous "made-in-Madurai movies" released since Kaadhal (2004), the romance of the lead pair and the writing but praised the cinematography and background music, even if the songs were "instantly forgettable", and said the comedy scenes were unamusing. The New Indian Express expressed similar views and wrote, "Poorly scripted, Sooriya Nagaram offers nothing exciting for the viewers".
