= Marakkuma Nenjam =

Indian drama film directed by Raako.Yoagandran

- Theatrical release poster
- Directed by: Raako.Yoagandran
- Written by: Raako.Yoagandran
- Produced by: Raghu Yelluru; Ramesh Panchagnula; Janardhan Chowdary; Raako.yoagandran
- Starring: Rakshan; Dheena; Malina
- Cinematography: Gopi Duraisamy
- Edited by: Balamurali; Shashank Mali
- Music by: Sachin Warrier
- Production companies: Filia Entertainment Pvt Ltd; Kuviyam Mediaworks
- Distributed by: S Picture
- Release date: 2 February 2024
- Country: India
- Language: Tamil

Marakkuma Nenjam (transl. Can the heart forget?) is a 2024 Indian Tamil-language coming-of-age film written and directed by Raako.Yoagandran. The film stars Rakshan, Dheena and Malina in the lead roles. The film was produced by Raghu Yelluru, Ramesh Panchagnula, Janardhan Chowdary, Raako.Yoagandran and under the banners of Filia Entertainment Pvt Ltd., Kuviyam Mediaworks. The film was released in theatres on 2 February 2024.

== Cast ==
- Rakshan as Karthik
- Dheena as Salim
- Malina as Priyadarshini
- Prankster Rahul as Gautham
- Swetha Venugopal as Saranya
- Munishkanth as Karthikeyan
- Muthazhagan Dhrona as Raghav
- Arun Kurian as Arjun

== Production ==
The pooja ceremony of Marakkuma Nenjam was scheduled for 20 July 2022. The film was shot across Kanyakumari at Bethlahem Schools of Karungal Kaniyakumari District and the first schedule of the filming was completed in September 2022. The first look was released on 15 May 2023. This film is the lead debut for Rakshan.

== Soundtrack ==
The soundtrack was composed by Sachin Warrier.

Track listing
No.	Title	Lyrics	Singer(s)	Length
1.	"Saaral Aagindra Mazhai"	Thamarai	Shweta Mohan	3:55
2.	"Netrum Indrum"	Thamarai	Sachin Warrier	4:44
3.	"Vaanilai"	Thamarai	Hitha	5:07
4.	"Thudikkum Nenjam"	Thamarai	Sathyaprakash, Sanah Moidutty	3:43
5.	"Kaalam – The Nostalgia"	Paa. Vi	Sachin Warrier	3:20
6.	"Vaazhaki – Break the Barrier"	Raako.Yogandran	Niranj Suresh, Vozhi	2:59
Total length:				23:48

== Release ==
The film was released in theaters on 2 February 2024.

== Reception ==
=== Critical response ===
Nakkheeran's critic wrote that they had seen many school love stories, but this one is a bit different from the ones they had seen in modern times and tells an old love story from a new perspective, somewhat well. Roopa Radhakrishnan of The Times of India who gave 2.5 out of 5 stars and stated "Alas, all said and done, the clear highlight of Marakkuma Nenjam is Sachin Warrier’s soundtrack, which perfectly captures the mood of what the film was going for even more than the film itself." Jayabhuvaneshwari B of Cinema Express who gave 1.5 out of 5 stars and stated "But when these films keep going back to age-old tropes and predictable plotlines, we can't help but wonder, "Haven't these 'high school filmmakers' learned their lessons yet?" Manigandan KR of Times Now who gave 1.5 out of 5 stars and stated "In short, Marakkuma Nenjam fails to impress."
