= Kovai Guna =

Indian actor, mimicry artist and comedian

- Died: 21 March 2023
- Occupations: Stand-up comedian, actor, mimicry artist
- Years active: 2005–2023

Kovai Guna, also known as Coimbatore Guna, (died 21 March 2023) was an Indian stand-up comedian, actor and mimicry artist. He was well known for his ability to present stand-up comedy in the television reality shows. He rose to prominence for his ability to entertain crowds with his mimicry performances and appropriate body language in television reality shows.

== Career ==
He got his breakthrough in Star Vijay's reality television show Kalakka Povathu Yaaru? where he entered the programme as one of the contestants in its inaugural season in 2005. He quickly gained fame and fanfare with his unique mimicry performances during the first edition of the Kalakka Povathu Yaaru? and he was adjudged as the winner of the competition during the first season.

He further established himself with his mimicry performances by taking part in Sun TV's reality television show Asatha Povadhu Yaaru. It was at Asatha Povadhu Yaaru, he made a formidable collaboration with fellow standup comedian Madurai Muthu and both of them gained a huge fan-following for their chemistry during their comical performances. Guna impressed the audience by imitating the body language and voice modulations of prominent actors including Sivaji Ganesan, M. R. Radha Goundamani and Janagaraj.

Following his notable comedy style and mimicry performances, he received film acting opportunities and he made his acting debut in Vikraman's directorial venture Chennai Kadhal (2006), which starred Bharath and Genelia D'Souza in the lead roles. He also featured in supporting roles in few more films Naalaiya Pozhuthum Unnodu (2007) and Sooriya Nagaram (2012). However, he refused to act in feature films as he began concentrating to work in reality television programmes and stage performances, which subsequently made it difficult for him to allocate his availability in order to make adjustments when giving callsheets to directors.

Guna in an interview revealed that leading filmmakers Prabhu Solomon and N. Lingusamy offered him film acting roles for their respective film projects, which he turned down owing to television commitments. He also visited countries including Malaysia and Singapore to take part in comedy oriented programmes. He also launched YouTube channel during the onset of the COVID-19 pandemic to elaborate content focusing on humour.

== Death ==
Guna died on 21 March 2023 due to heart related ailments at the age of 57. Prior to his death, he reportedly underwent dialysis for over a year after being diagnosed with kidney renal failure at a private hospital in Coimbatore.

== Filmography ==
- Chennai Kadhal (2006)
- Naalaiya Pozhuthum Unnodu (2007)
- Sooriya Nagaram (2012)

Television

- Kalakka Povathu Yaaru? (Star Vijay)
- Asatha Povadhu Yaaru (Sun TV)
