= Mimicry Sethu =

Indian actor, mimicry artist and comedian

Mimicry Sethu also known as Sethu Subbu (born as Sethu Subramaniyam) is an Indian dubbing artist, television presenter, actor, comedian, video jockey and mimicry artist. He is well known for his works in the television field. He rose to prominence for his ability to entertain crowds with his mimicry performances by enacting vocal variations of several high-profile celebrities in television reality shows and in social media platforms. He received the adjective and nickname "Mimicry" for his portrayal of mimicry style which had since then become his stage name and professional name.

== Biography ==
His father Sivagangai Sethurajan was also a mimicry artist and had engaged in mimicry acts by imitating voices of several prominent individuals during his career. His father Sivagangai Sethurajan was also deeply involved in politics having worked as a loyalist for the prominent Tamil Nadu political parties Dravida Munnetra Kazhagam and All India Anna Dravida Munnetra Kazhagam during his career. He had actively involved in politics having campaigned for Dravida Munnetra Kazhagam and Anna Dravida Munnetra Kazhagam in various time frames beginning his political journey in 1970s.

His father Sivagangai Sethurajan notably imitated the voice of former Tamil Nadu chief minister C. N. Annadurai (popularly known as Perarignar Anna) for a film portion sequence in Iyakkunar Sigaram K. Balachander's directorial venture Iru Kodugal (1969). The stills of Perarignar Anna including his throne and pair of glasses were displayed in the film Iru Kodumaigal (Perarignar Anna eventually died in February 1969 due to a long battle with cancer and the film had its theatrical release in October 2024) whereas the director incorporated the mimicry of Sivagangai Sethurajan in a scene which also involved the lead actress of the film Sowcar Janaki as the latter being advised by C. N. Annadurai in a telephonic conversation on how to tackle key underlying challenges prevailing in the society with the intention to uplift the living standards of public.

Sethu apparently learnt the art of mimicry from his father and Sethu was inspired to become a mimicry artist ever since having witnessed his father imitating voice variations in mimicry style from his early childhood. The house which legally belonged to his father Sivagangai Sethurajan was demolished and bulldozed in April 2019 during the regime of the All India Anna Dravida Munnetra Kazhagam. During the time of dismantling the house, Sethu and his brother resided there and they evacuated to their sister's house immediately due to the destruction of their house by the Land and Building Authority without a prior notice. It was revealed that his father apparently received a perch of land as a goodwill gesture and as a gift to build a house at Chennai, in recognition of his work contributing to the growth and success of AIADMK party during the latter stages of his lifetime.

== Career ==
He served as one of the judges in the Star Vijay comedy premiere show, Kalakka Povathu Yaaru? alongside Thadi Balaji, Priyanka Deshpande, Erode Mahesh and Aarthi. He served as the judge in Season 5, 6 and 7 of Kalakka Povathu Yaaru? where he was judging the comical performances of the contestants throughout the programmes.

Sethu made his film acting debut in Ilaya Ragam (1995) where he played in a minor role featuring as a close friend of veteran actor Vivek. He was roped in by filmmaker Chakri Toleti to give voiceover by reprising and imitating the voice of the then chief minister of Tamil Nadu M. Karunanidhi in a film portion sequence of Kamal Haasan starrer Unnaipol Oruvan (2009). It was revealed that Chakri had been made well aware of Mimicry Sethu's mimicry style and hence Chakri chose Sethu to imitate the voice of M. Karunanidhi for a lengthy dialogue delivery where Sethu managed to pull off Karunanidhi's trademark raspy voice during the phone call portion in an elegant way.

He also made a film appearance in Pulivaal (2014) which had Vimal in the main lead role. His breakthrough role in film acting career came when he acted in Sibiraj-Aishwarya Rajesh starrer Kattappava Kaanom (2017). He played supporting role featuring alongside fellow character artists including Yogi Babu, J. Livingston, Mime Gopi and Kaali Venkat.

He also made a special appearance in television soap opera Sillunu Oru Kaadhal (2021) aired in Colors Tamil and acted in a role as a special judge in announcing the winners of the Ganesh Chaturthi event.

== Filmography ==
=== Films ===
- Ilaya Ragam (1995)
- Pulivaal (2014)
- Kattappava Kaanom (2017)

=== Television ===
- Kalakka Povathu Yaaru (2012-2015)
- Sillunu Oru Kaadhal (2021)
- Valli Thirumanam (2022)
- Ponni (2023)
