= Cooku with Comali season 2 =

Cooku with Comali
- Season 2
- Hosted by: Rakshan
- Judges: Chef Damodharan; Chef Venkatesh Bhat
- No. of contestants: 9
- Winner: Kani Thiru
- Runner-up: Shakeela
- No. of episodes: 41

Release
- Original release: 14 November 2020 – 14 April 2021

Season chronology
- Next → Season 3

Cooku with Comali 2 is the second season of the Tamil reality cooking TV show Cooku with Comali, that was aired first on 14 November 2020. This season was hosted by Rakshan. The grand finale was aired on 14 April 2021 and winner was Kani Thiru.

== Contestants ==
Contestants	Status
Kani Thiru	Winner
Shakeela	1st Runner-Up
Ashwin Kumar Lakshmikanthan	2nd Runner-Up
Baba Bhaskar	3rd Runner-Up
Pavithra Lakshmi	4th Runner-Up
Rithika Tamil Selvi	Eliminated
Dharsha Gupta	Eliminated
Deepa Shankar	Eliminated
Madurai Muthu	Eliminated

== Comalis ==
- KPY Bala
- Manimegalai
- Pappu
- Pugazh
- Parvathy Saran
- Sakthi Raj
- Sarath Raj
- Sivaangi Krishnakumar
- Sunita Gogoi
- Tiger Thangadurai

== Cook Pairings ==
Contestants	Week 1 14 & 15 Nov 2020	Week 2 21 & 22 Nov 2020	Week 3 28 & 29 Nov 2020	Week 4 5 & 6 Dec 2020	Week 5 12 & 13 Dec 2020	Week 6 19 & 20 Dec 2020	Week 7 26 & 27 Dec 2020	Week 8 2 & 3 Jan 2021	Week 9 9 & 10 Jan 2021	Week 10 16 & 23 Jan 2021	Week 11 30 & 31 Jan 2021	Week 12 6 & 7 Feb 2021	Week 13 13 & 14 Feb 2021	Week 14 20 & 21 Feb 2021	Week 15 27 & 28 Feb 2021	Week 16 6 & 7 Mar 2021	Week 17 13 & 14 Mar 2021	Week 18 20 & 21 Mar 2021 Semi Finals	Week 19 27 & 28 Mar 2021 Wild Card Round	Week 20 3 & 4 April 2021	Week 21 15 April 2021 Finals Round 1	Week 21 15 April 2021 Finals Round 2
Ashwin Kumar Lakshmikanthan	Sarath Raj	Sivaangi Krishnakumar		Sivaangi Krishnakumar	Manimegalai	Sivaangi Krishnakumar	Sunita Gogoi	Manimegalai -Advantage task Sivaangi Krishnakumar, Sunita Gogoi- Main task	Tiger Thangadurai	Sivaangi Krishnakumar		Pugazh	Pugazh	Manimegalai	Sarath Raj	Sivaangi Krishnakumar	Sivaangi Krishnakumar					
Baba Bhaskar	Manimegalai	Bala		Sakthi Raj	Pugazh	Sunita Gogoi	Sivaangi Krishnakumar	Sivaangi Krishnakumar, Sunita Gogoi - Advantage task Manimegalai - Main task	Sivaangi Krishnakumar	Bala	Sivaangi Krishnakumar, Manimegalai	Sarath Raj	Manimegalai	Pugazh	Sivaangi Krishnakumar	Bala		Tiger Thangadurai & Sakthi Raj			Bala	Manimegalai & Sarath Raj
Kani Thiru	Parvathy Saran	Manimegalai	Sarath Raj	Sunita Gogoi	Sunita Gogoi	Manimegalai	Pugazh		Sunita Gogoi	Sunita Gogoi	Bala, Sakthi Raj	Sunita Gogoi	Sivaangi Krishnakumar		Sunita Gogoi	Manimegalai	Pugazh	Pugazh & Sarath Raj		Pugazh	Sivaangi Krishnakumar	Sunita Gogoi
Shakeela	Sunita Gogoi	Pugazh	Manimegalai	Sarath Raj		Bala	Sarath Raj		Parvathy Saran	Pugazh	Pugazh, Sunita Gogoi	Manimegalai	Sarath Raj	Sunita Gogoi	Tiger Thangadurai	Pugazh	Manimegalai	Sunitha Gogoi & Pappu	Tiger Thangadurai	Sarath Raj	Sunita Gogoi	Pugazh
Pavithra Lakshmi	Pugazh	Sarath Raj	Sivaangi Krishnakumar	Pugazh	Bala	Pugazh	Manimegalai	Bala	Manimegalai	Manimegalai	Sarath Raj, Tiger Thangadurai	Sivaangi Krishnakumar	Sunita Gogoi	Sivaangi Krishnakumar			Bala		Pugazh	Sunita Gogoi	Pugazh	Sivaangi Krishnakumar
Rithika Tamil Selvi												Bala	Bala	Bala					Sarath Raj	Sakthi Raj		
Dharsha Gupta	Sivaangi Krishnakumar	Sakthi Raj	Pugazh	Parvathy Saran	Sarath Raj	Sarath Raj	Bala	Pugazh	Sarath Raj										Sunita Gogoi	Tiger Thangadurai		
Deepa Shankar	Sakthi Raj	Sunita Gogoi	Sunita Gogoi	Manimegalai	Sivaangi Krishnakumar		Sakthi Raj		Sakthi Raj										Sivaangi Krishnakumar	Mohamed Kuraishi		
Madurai Muthu	Bala	Pappu	Bala				Tiger Thangadurai		Bala										Bala	Bala		

Guests	Week 15
Vanitha Vijayakumar	Bala
Uma Riyaz Khan	Sakthi Raj
Ramya Pandian	Pugazh
Rekha	Manimegalai

== Comali Pairings ==
Comalis	Week 1 14 & 15 Nov 2020	Week 2 21 & 22 Nov 2020	Week 3 28 & 29 Nov 2020	Week 4 5 & 6 Dec 2020	Week 5 12 & 13 Dec 2020	Week 6 19 & 20 Dec 2020	Week 7 26 & 27 Dec 2020	Week 8 2 & 3 Jan 2021	Week 9 9 & 10 Jan 2021	Week 10 16 & 23 Jan 2021	Week 11 30 & 31 Jan 2021
Pugazh	Pavithra Lakshmi (Bijili vedi)	Shakeela (Butcher knife, Cutting board)	Dharsha Gupta (X-Ray: Santhanam/ Thilalangadi)	Pavithra Lakshmi (Puli pal chain: Minor Kuju)	Baba Bhaskar	Pavithra Lakshmi (Laptop: Call center officer)	Kani Thiru (Michael Jackson)	Dharsha Gupta (Kuthu Dance)		Shakeela (Green handprint)	Shakeela (Gadhai, Paasa kayiru: Suma dharmaraja; (Yama dharmaraja)/ Lucky Man)
Sivaangi Krishnakumar	Dharsha Gupta (Busvanam)	Ashwin Kumar Lakshmikanthan (Pressure cooker)	Pavithra Lakshmi (Alleppey Boat House picture (Jessie): Trisha/ Vinnaithaandi Varuvaayaa)	Ashwin Kumar Lakshmikanthan (Ribbon: Arukani)	Deepa Shankar	Ashwin Kumar Lakshmikanthan (School bag, Water bottle: School kid)	Baba Bhaskar (Rose (Titanic) / Kate Winslet)	Baba Bhaskar - Advantage tasks Ashwin Kumar Lakshmikanthan - Main task (Mohiniyattam)	Baba Bhaskar (Sword: Pulikesi/ Imsai Arasan 23rd Pulikecei)	Ashwin Kumar Lakshmikanthan (Blue handprint)	Baba Bhaskar (Vethalai dabba Thiripurasundari/ Michael Madana Kama Rajan)
Bala	Madurai Muthu (Thupakki)	Baba Bhaskar (Lighter)	Madurai Muthu (Pattapatti Aruva: Karthi/ Paruthiveeran)		Pavitra Lakshmi	Shakeela (Lawyer coat: Lawyer)	Dharsha Gupta (Arnold Schwarzenegger)	Pavithra Lakshmi (Bharatanatyam)	Madurai Muthu(Bullet bike: 'Bullet' Pandi/ Kovil)	Baba Bhaskar (Yellow handprint)	Kani Thiru (Aiyampettai Arivudainambi Kaliyaperumal Chandran/ Thillu Mullu)
Manimegalai	Baba Bhaskar (Poondu vedi)	Kani Thiru (Sombu)	Shakeela (Scooter: (Kadhambari "Kadhu"); Nayanthara/ Naanum Rowdy Thaan)	Deepa Shankar (Mallipoo: Pookari)	Ashwin Kumar Lakshmikanthan	Kani Thiru (Spoon, Fork, Chef coat: Chef)	Pavithra Lakshmi (Angelina Jolie)	Ashwin Kumar Lakshmikanthan - Advantage tasks Baba Bhaskar - Main task (Kathak)	Pavithra Lakshmi (Scent: 'Dubai' Sudalai/ Vetri Kodi Kattu)	Pavithra Lakshmi (Red handprint)	Baba Bhaskar (Vethalai dabba Thiruttu paati/ Michael Madana Kama Rajan)
Sunita Gogoi	Shakeela (Susur kambi)	Deepa Shankar (Flask)	Deepa Shankar (Robot: Amy Jackson/ Enthiran 2)	Kani Thiru (Karagam: Karagattakari)	Kani Thiru	Baba Bhaskar (Nunchucks: Karate kid)	Ashwin Kumar Lakshmikanthan (Marilyn Monroe)	Baba Bhaskar Ashwin Kumar Lakshmikanthan (Garba dance)	Kani Thiru (Police hat: 'Encounter' Ekaambaram/ Marudhamalai)	Kani Thiru (Pink handprint)	Shakeela (Gadhai, Paasa kayiru: Darshagupta; (Chitragupta)/ Lucky Man)
Sarath Raj	Ashwin Kumar Lakshmikanthan (Saravedi)	Pavithra Lakshmi (Cylinder)	Kani Thiru (Kambu: Dhanush/ Asuran)	Shakeela (Guduguduppu: Guduguduppukaran)	Dharsha Gupta	Dharsha Gupta (Flask with chemicals, Magnifying glass: Scientist)	Shakeela (Johnny Pepp: Jack Sparrow/ Johnny Depp)	Comali selection	Dharsha Gupta (Hammer, Bag: Contractor Nesamani/ Friends)	Comali selection	Pavithra Lakshmi (Telescope, Warrior helmet Kattappa/ Baahubali)
Sakthi Raj	Deepa Shankar (Theekuchi)	Dharsha Gupta (Mixie)	(S. Duraisingam ACP): Suriya/ Singam	Baba Bhaskar (Paal jaadi: Rajinikanth/ Annamalai)			Deepa Shankar (Jack (Titanic) /Leonardo DiCaprio)		Deepa Shankar (Kuthi mittai, Kuruvi rotti: Kaipulla/ Winner)		Kani Thiru (Aiyampettai Arivudainambi Kaliyaperumal Indran/ Thillu Mullu)
Parvathy Saran	Kani Thiru (Saatai)		Ritika Singh/ Irudhi Suttru	Dharsha Gupta (Umbrella: Teacher/ Kadalora Kavithaigal)					Shakeela (Walkie Talkie: 'Theeppori' Thirumugam/ Englishkaran		
Tiger Thangadurai							Madurai Muthu (Sorry Potter: Harry Potter/ Daniel Radcliffe)		Ashwin Kumar Lakshmikanthan (Thagara petti: Nai Sekar/ Thalai Nagaram)		Pavithra Lakshmi (Telescope, Warrior helmet Pingalathevan/ Baahubali)
Pappu		Madurai Muthu (Kadai, Jalli karandi)									

Advantage Tasks
Main Tasks

Comalis	Week 12 6 & 7 Feb 2021	Week 13 13 & 14 Feb 2021	Week 14 20 & 21 Feb 2021	Week 15 27 & 28 Feb 2021	Week 16 6 & 7 Mar 2021	Week 17 13 & 14 Mar 2021
Pugazh	Ashwin Kumar Lakshmikanthan (Rowdy Baby)	Ashwin Kumar Lakshmikanthan (Kin-chan: Shin-chan)	Baba Bhaskar (Dhanush/ Maari)	Ramya Pandian	Shakeela (Pasupathi: Sonu Sood/ Arundhati)	Kani Thiru (Cooku With Comali/ Baba Bhaskar)
Sivaangi Krishnakumar	Pavithra Lakshmi (Chellama)	Kani Thiru (Sora bujji: Dora Bujji )	Pavithra Lakshmi (Nithya: Samantha Akkineni/ Neethaane En Ponvasantham)	Baba Bhaskar	Ashwin Kumar Lakshmikanthan (Annabelle)	Ashwin Kumar Lakshmikanthan (Airtel Super Singer/ Anuradha Sriram)
Bala	Rithika (Kaatu Payale)	Rithika(Sumarman: Superman)	Rithika (Raghuvaran/ Mudhalvan	Vanitha Vijayakumar	Baba Bhaskar (Jaganmohini)	Pavithra Lakshmi (Neeya Naana/ Gopinath Chandran: Shobinath)
Manimegalai	Shakeela (Gaanda Kannazhagi)	Baba Bhaskar (Chhota Bheem)	Ashwin Kumar Lakshmikanthan (Sivaji Ganesan /Thillana Mohanambal)	Rekha	Kani Thiru (Kanchana)	Shakeela (Jodi Number One/ Sandy Master: Pandi Master)
Sunita Gogoi	Kani Thiru (Bujji)	Pavithra Lakshmi (Manidha silandhi: Spider-Man)	Shakeela (Duraiammal: Amy Jackson/ Madrasapattinam)	Kani Thiru		
Sarath Raj	Baba Bhaskar (Vaathi)	Shakeela (Catman: Batman)		Ashwin Kumar Lakshmikanthan	Comali selection	
Sakthi Raj				Uma Riyaz Khan		
Parvathy Saran						
Tiger Thangadurai				Shakeela		
Pappu						

== Weekly Activities ==
	Week 1 14 & 15 Nov 2020				Week 2 21 & 22 Nov 2020				Week 3 28 & 29 Nov 2020				Week 4 5 & 6 Dec 2020				Week 5 12 & 13 Dec 2020				Week 6 19 & 20 Dec 2020				Week 7 26 & 27 Dec 2020				Week 8 2 & 3 Jan 2021				Week 9 9 & 10 Jan 2021				Week 10 16 & 23 Jan 2021				Week 11 30 & 31 Jan 2021			
	A1	A2	M	F	A1	A2	M	I	A1	A2	M	E	A1	A2	M	I	A1	A2	M	E	A1	A2	M	I	A1	A2	M	F	A1	A2	M	E	A1	A2	M	F	A1	A2	M	I	A1	A2	M	E
Contestants
Ashwin Kumar Lakshmikanthan	Sarath Raj				Sivaangi Krishnakumar								Sivaangi Krishnakumar				Manimegalai				Sivaangi Krishnakumar				Sunita Gogoi				Manimegalai		Sivaangi Krishnakumar, Sunita Gogoi		Tiger Thangadurai				Sivaangi Krishnakumar							
Ashwin Kumar Lakshmikanthan	Yes	No	Yes	Yes	Yes		Yes	No					Yes		Yes	No	Yes	Yes	Yes		Yes		Yes		Yes	Yes	Yes	No	Yes	No	Yes		Yes		Yes	Yes	Yes		Yes	Yes				
Baba Bhaskar	Manimegalai				Bala								Sakthi Raj				Pugazh				Sunita Gogoi				Sivaangi Krishnakumar				Sivaangi Krishnakumar, Sunita Gogoi		Manimegalai		Sivaangi Krishnakumar				Bala				Sivaangi Krishnakumar, Manimegalai			
Baba Bhaskar	Yes		Yes	No	Yes	Yes	Yes	Yes					Yes	No	Yes		Yes	No	Yes		Yes	No	Yes		Yes	No	Yes	Yes	Yes	No	Yes		Yes		Yes	Yes	Yes	Yes	Yes	No	Yes	No	Yes	Yes
Kani Thiru	Parvathy Saran				Manimegalai				Sarath Raj				Sunita Gogoi				Sunita Gogoi				Manimegalai				Pugazh								Sunita Gogoi				Sunita Gogoi				Bala, Sakthi Raj			
Kani Thiru	Yes	No	Yes		Yes		Yes		Yes	No	Yes		Yes	No	Yes	No	Yes	No	Yes		Yes	No	Yes	Yes	Yes	No	Yes						Yes	Yes	Yes		Yes	No	Yes		Yes	Yes	Yes	Yes
Shakeela	Sunita Gogoi				Pugazh				Manimegalai				Sarath Raj								Bala				Sarath Raj								Parvathy Saran				Manimegalai				Pugazh, Sunita Gogoi			
Shakeela	Yes	No	Yes	No	Yes	Yes	Yes	No	Yes	No	Yes		Yes	No	Yes	Yes					Yes	Yes	Yes	No	Yes	No	Yes	No					Yes	No	Yes	Yes	Yes	No	Yes		Yes	No	Yes	Yes
Pavithra Lakshmi	Pugazh				Sarath Raj				Sivaangi Krishnakumar				Pugazh				Bala				Pugazh				Manimegalai				Bala				Manimegalai				Pugazh				Sarath Raj, Tiger Thangadurai			
Pavithra Lakshmi	Yes	Yes	Yes		Yes	No	Yes		Yes		Yes		Yes	Yes	Yes		Yes		Yes		Yes	No	Yes	No	Yes		Yes		Yes		Yes	Yes	Yes		Yes		Yes	No	Yes	No	Yes		Yes	
Rithika																																												
Dharsha Gupta	Sivaangi Krishnakumar				Sakthi Raj				Pugazh				Parvathy Saran				Sarath Raj				Sarath Raj				Bala				Pugazh				Sarath Raj											
Dharsha Gupta	Yes	No	Yes	No	Yes		Yes	No	Yes		Yes	Yes	Yes		Yes	No	Yes	No	Yes	Yes	Yes		Yes		Yes		Yes	No	Yes	Yes	Yes	No	Yes	No	Yes									
Deepa Shankar	Sakthi Raj				Sunita Gogoi				Sunita Gogoi				Manimegalai				Sivaangi Krishnakumar								Sakthi Raj								Sakthi Raj											
Deepa Shankar	Yes		Yes		Yes	No	Yes		Yes	Yes	Yes		Yes		Yes		Yes		Yes	No					Yes		Yes						Yes		Yes									
Madurai Muthu	Bala				Pappu				Bala																Tiger Thangadurai								Bala											
Madurai Muthu	Yes		Yes		Yes		Yes		Yes	No	Yes	No													Yes		Yes						Yes	No	Yes	No								

	Week 12 6 & 7 Feb 2021				Week 13 13 & 14 Feb 2021				Week 14 20 & 21 Feb 2021				Week 15 27 & 28 Feb 2021				Week 16 6 & 7 Mar 2021				Week 17 13 & 14 Mar 2021			
	A1	A2	M	F	A1	A2	M	I	A1	A2	M	E	A1	A2	M	F	A1	A2	M	I	A1	A2	M	E
Contestants																								
Ashwin Kumar	Pugazh				Pugazh				Manimegalai				Sarath Raj				Sivaangi Krishnakumar				Sivaangi Krishnakumar			
Ashwin Kumar	Yes	Yes	Yes	No	Yes	No	Yes	No	Yes		Yes		Yes		Yes		Yes	No	Yes	No	Yes	No	Yes	No
Baba Bhaskar	Sarath Raj				Manimegalai				Pugazh				Sivaangi Krishnakumar				Bala							
Baba Bhaskar	Yes	No	Yes	No	Yes		Yes	No	Yes		Yes		Yes		Yes	No	Yes	Yes	Yes	Yes				
Kani Thiru	Sunita Gogoi				Sivaangi Krishnakumar								Sunita Gogoi				Manimegalai				Pugazh			
Kani Thiru	Yes	No	Yes	Yes	Yes	No	Yes	Yes					Yes	No	Yes	Yes	Yes		Yes		Yes	Yes	Yes	
Shakeela	Manimegalai				Sarath Raj				Sunita Gogoi				Tiger Thangadurai				Pugazh				Manimegalai			
Shakeela	Yes		Yes		Yes		Yes		Yes	No	Yes		Yes		Yes		Yes	No	Yes		Yes	No	Yes	
Pavithra Lakshmi	Sivaangi Krishnakumar				Sunita Gogoi				Sivaangi Krishnakumar												Bala			
Pavithra Lakshmi	Yes	No	Yes		Yes		Yes	No	Yes	Yes	Yes	Yes									Yes		Yes	No
Rithika	Bala				Bala				Bala															
Rithika	Yes		Yes		Yes	Yes	Yes		Yes	No	Yes	No												
Dharsha Gupta																								
Deepa Shankar																								
Madurai Muthu																								
Guests																								
Vanitha Vijayakumar													Bala											
Vanitha Vijayakumar													Yes	No	Yes									
Uma Riyaz Khan													Sakthi Raj											
Uma Riyaz Khan													Yes	No	Yes	No								
Ramya Pandian													Pugazh											
Ramya Pandian													Yes	Yes	Yes	No								
Rekha													Manimegalai											
Rekha													Yes		Yes									

== Guests ==
KPY Yogi	For Comali Pairings
Sandy Master	Supporting Ashwin
Sudharshan Govind	Supporting Pavithra Lakshmi
Mila Babygirl	Supporting Shakeela
RJ Balaji	To promote Mookuthi Amman
Vani Bhojan Madhuri Jain	To promote Triples (web series)
Sivakarthikeyan	For Pongal celebration
Rekha Ramya Pandian Vanitha Vijayakumar Uma Riyaz Khan	For Top four contestants from Season 1 for celebration round
Rio Raj	To promote plan panni pannanum movie
Dhee Santhosh Narayanan Arivu	Special Guests for finale
Mugen Rao	Special Guests for finale
AR Rahman99 Songs Director and Main Lead	Special Guests for finale
Silambarasan	Special Guests for finale
