= Kattappava Kanom =

2017 Indian Tamil-language film by Mani Seiyon

- Poster
- Directed by: Mani Seiyon
- Written by: Mani Seiyon
- Produced by: WindChimes Media Entertainments
- Starring: Sibi Sathyaraj; Aishwarya Rajesh; Kaali Venkat; Yogi Babu; Mime Gopi; Livingston
- Narrated by: Vijay Sethupathi
- Cinematography: Anand Jeeva
- Edited by: Sathish Suriya
- Music by: Santhosh Dhayanidhi
- Production company: WindChimes Media Entertainments
- Distributed by: Sri Green Productions
- Release date: 17 March 2017
- Running time: 125 minutes
- Country: India
- Language: Tamil

Kattappava Kanom (transl. Kattappa is Missing) is a 2017 Tamil-language comedy film written and directed by Mani Seiyon, starring Sibi Sathyaraj and Aishwarya Rajesh. Featuring an ensemble cast of supporting actors including Kaali Venkat, Yogi Babu, Mime Gopi, and Livingston, the film was released on 17 March 2017.

== Plot ==
Vanjaram (Mime Gopi), a gangster, owns an asian arowana fish named Kattappa, which is believed to be his lucky charm. One night, Kattappa gets stolen by a thief, and after a string of events, it ends up in Pandian's (Sibi Sathyaraj) house. Pandian is considered an epitome of bad luck after multiple business failures, and his father even calls him "Bad Luck" Pandian. Pandian falls in love with and marries an open-minded girl named Meena (Aishwarya Rajesh). They move into a new apartment, where they meet a little girl named Kayal (Baby Monica) who has lost her mother at a young age and develops a bonding with the couple. Kayal yearns for a miracle which will make her wishes come true. When Kattappa ends up in their house, they discover that it is indeed a lucky fish.

== Cast ==
- Sibi Sathyaraj as "Bad Luck" Pandian
- Aishwarya Rajesh as Meenakumari
- Kaali Venkat as Keechan
- Yogi Babu as Nandu
- Mime Gopi as Vanjaram
- Baby Monica as Kayal
- Livingston as Aali
- Thirumurugan as Sura
- Nalan Kumarasamy as Dr. Rakesh
- Jayakumar as Perusu
- Chitra Lakshmanan as Jayagopal, "Bad Luck" Pandian's father
- Tamil Selvi as Kanchana, Vanjaram's wife
- Dhindukal Saravanan as Sankara
- Mona Kakade as Meenakumari's mother
- "Kumbakonam" Ravi Chandran as Vanjaram's Assistant
- Meena Vemuri as Kayal's teacher
- Venkat Subha as an Astrologer
- Mimicry Sethu as Kayal's father
- Rekha Suresh as Meenakumari's aunt
- Supergood Subramani as Water tanker driver
- Chandini Tamilarasan as "Surprise" Sheela (Cameo Appearance)

== Production ==
In early 2016, R. Manikandan announced that he would make a film revolving around a lucky fish starring Sibi Sathyaraj and that Aishwarya Rajesh and Chandini Tamilarasan would portray the leading female roles. The project developed under the title Thanni Raja, with Kaali Venkat, Mime Gopi and Livingston announced as cast members in March 2016. Film director Nalan Kumarasamy also later joined the cast to portray a veterinary doctor, who attends to a fish. The film was re-titled as Kattappava Kanom during June 2016, making reference to the popular character of Kattappa from Baahubali: The Beginning (2015) portrayed by Sibiraj's father, Sathyaraj. Vijay Sethupathi agreed to work as a narrator in the film, and dubbed for his portions in late 2016.

== Soundtrack ==
Kattappava Kanom (Original Motion Picture Soundtrack)

Soundtrack album by Santhosh Dhayanidhi
- Released: 21 October 2016
- Genre: Film soundtrack
- Length: 13:47
- Language: Tamil
- Label: Sony Music India

Santhosh Dhayanidhi chronology
Enakku Vaaitha Adimaigal (2015)	Kattappava Kanom (Original Motion Picture Soundtrack) (2016)	Madura Veeran (2017)

The film's music was composed by Santhosh Dhayanidhi, who had previously worked on Inimey Ippadithan (2015). The soundtrack was released by Sony Music India on 21 October 2016.

No.	Title	Lyrics	Singer(s)	Length
1.	"Hey Penne"	Uma Devi	Sid Sriram, Alisha Thomas, Aishwarya Kumar	3:19
2.	"Kangalai Suttrum Kanavugalai"	Muthamil	Sathya Prakash, Shashaa Tirupati	3:55
3.	"The Vatti Song"	Muthamil	Anthony Daasan	3:33
Total length:				13:47

== Release ==
The film was released on 17 March 2017, alongside four other Tamil films and received mixed to negative reviews. The Hindustan Times gave the film 2.5 stars out of 5 and said "nevertheless, with an interesting premise about the lives of a few characters that revolve around a Feng Sui fish-and not a heroine for a change—it's an amusing diversion from the regular Tamil cinema, and that's a change that deserves to be welcomed even if it's not worth celebrating". A critic from the Times of India wrote, "considering the theme and its potential, the movie could have been a lot whackier. However, the movie is still an engaging diversion. But the movie never gets past its jokes. While there's no scarcity of it, the jokes could have been funnier and the pace, a bit more swift". In contrast, Sify.com's reviewers noted "Kattapava Kanom is fantasy-dark humor movie and if you're not into this particular genre, chances are, you're not going to like the 'juvenile humor' much either" and "the movie's biggest turn-off is the dead-slow pace of narration, not to mention that there isn't anything remotely logical in the movie". The Hindu's review concluded that it was a "wacky subject ruined by aimless filmmaking". Baradwaj Rangan of Film Companion wrote "There's nothing wrong with sex comedies, but instead of a balls-out attack on good taste – as in the resolutely A-rated Trisha Illana Nayanthara – Kattappava Kaanom goes the sleazy wink-nudge route."
