= Madurai Muthu =

Indian actor, television personality and comedian

- Occupation: Comedian

Madurai Muthu is an Indian stand-up comedian. He rose to prominence after taking part in Sun TV's reality stand-up comedy television program Asatha Povadhu Yaaru, where he received a career breakthrough for his stand-up comedy. Despite having a following through Sun TV, he apparently joined its rival channel Star Vijay, in which he is portrayed as the face of the channel as he predominantly appears in reality television programmes aired in Star Vijay.

He is known for his property jokes, as he often uses props and tools to crack jokes in order to relate with the audience, which has become a go-to most sought after trademark style of him.

== Career ==
He established himself with his stand-up comedy performances by taking part in Sun TV's reality television show Asatha Povadhu Yaaru. It was at Asatha Povadhu Yaaru, he made a formidable collaboration with standup comedian Kovai Guna and both of them gained a fan-following for their chemistry during their comical performances. Madurai Muthu delivered stand-up comedy by incorporating property jokes. He also made the habit to spontaneously bring up props to crack jokes. He also began compiling books and recorded the jokes in order for him to incorporate them in impromptu stage speeches.

He was one of the contestants of the season 2 of the Cooku With Comali, which was broadcast in Star Vijay. He also served as a judge in season 9, season 10 of the Tamil-language reality stand-up comedy television program Kalakka Povathu Yaaru?.

== Personal life ==
Muthu's wife Vaiyyammal died in a car accident in 2016. When she was traveling to Pilliyarpatti temple near Thiruppathur in Sivaganga district in her car, her car ended up in an accident after colliding on a tree and she died on the spot.

== Filmography ==
- Akilan (2012)
- Nathikal Nanaivathillai (2015)
- Sabhaapathy (2021)
- Kuttram Kuttrame (2022)
- Baba Black Sheep (2023)
- Desingu Raja 2 (2025)
- Happy Raj (2026) as Boskey

== Television ==
- Asatha Povadhu Yaaru (Sun TV)
- Cooku with Comali season 2 (Star Vijay)
- Cooku with Comali season 3 (Star Vijay) as Guest Comali
- Cooku with Comali season 5 (Star Vijay) as Guest
- Comedy Raja Kalakkal Rani (Star Vijay) as Judge
- Kalakka Povathu Yaaru? as Judge (season 9–10)
- Kalakka Povathu Yaaru? Champions as Judge (season 3–4)
