= Pappu =

Male given name

Pappu is a male given name in some regions of India. The name pappu is taken from the English word papa which is a nickname for a small boy in India.

Pappu has been used frequently in popular culture (e.g., A. R. Rahman's chartbuster "Pappu Can't Dance", Election Commission's "Pappu can't vote" campaign and Cadbury's "Pappu Pass Ho Gaya" ad campaign). It has also been used in film titles such as Aur Pappu Paas Ho Gaya (2007), Pappu Can't Dance Saala (2011).

== Origins ==
"Pappu is an underdog, a lovable character who is smart enough. In fact, all of us have met some or the other Pappus at some point in our life."

— Abhijit Avasthi of Ogilvy & Mather (Credited for introducing "Pappu" to advertisement world)

According to The Economic Times, using the name Pappu in ad campaigns connects with consumers. They also described Pappu as the "darling salesman" for marketers.

The first use of Pappu in advertisement campaign was done by Cadbury chocolates in 2006. Abhijit Avasthi of the advertising agency Ogilvy & Mather is credited for the introducing Pappu into the advertisement world for Cadbury. Cadbury popularized Pappu through its ad campaign pappu is ballu "Pappu Pass Ho Gaya" ("Pappu Has Passed Exam"), which showed a bald, middle-aged man as Pappu, who passed his school exam after many attempts. The entire town celebrated Pappu's success by distributing Cadbury chocolates.

In 2007, following the Cadbury ad campaign, the Bollywood film Aur Pappu Paas Ho Gaya was released which played off the ad campaign slogan, but presented its lead character Pappu as a dimwitted young man. The 2008 film Jaane Tu... Ya Jaane Na featured the song "Pappu Can't Dance", again presenting the same idea of Pappu as a dimwitted man, which was one of the top songs in India that year.

== Latter uses ==
The name was used in an ad campaign for Maruti Suzuki which says "Maruti Genuine Parts lagaoge to pappu nahi kahelaoge" ("If you use Maruti Genuine Parts, then you won't be called Pappu").

Pappu has been featured in a traffic awareness campaign for Kerala Police. They created "Pappu the Zebra" as their road safety awareness mascot. Some schools in Kerala also set up "Pappu zones" in school where students made aware about various road safety rules.

== Notable people named Pappu ==
- Kuthiravattam Pappu (1936-2000), Indian comedian in Malayalam-language films
- Pappu Venugopala Rao (b. 1948), Indian educationist and musicologist from Andhra Pradesh. However, Pappu is a surname in Andhra Pradesh region and is not derogatory.
- Pappu Kalani (b. 1951), Indian criminal-turned-politician from Maharashtra
- Pappu Yadav (b. 1967), Indian politician from Bihar
- Pappu Sain, Pakistani dhol musician
- Papu Pom Pom (b. 1977), popular comedian in Odia films
