= Rakshan =

Indian television personality (born 1991)

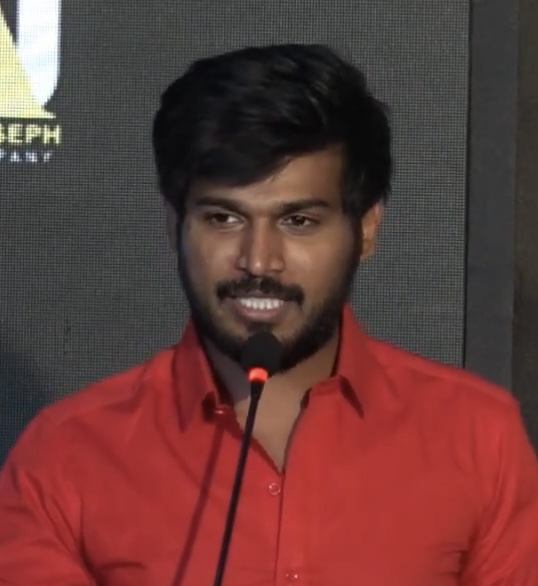
- Rakshan at the premier of Kannum Kannum Kollaiyadithaal in 2020
- Born: 16 April 1991 (age 35); Chennai, Tamil Nadu, India
- Occupations: Radio jockey; television presenter; actor
- Years active: 2014–present
- Spouse: Saranya
- Children: 1

Rakshan more popularly known as VJ Rakshan (born 16 April 1991) is an Indian television presenter currently working with Star Vijay. He has hosted Kalakka Povathu Yaaru? seasons 5, 6 and 7 and Cooku with Comali. He previously worked for Raj TV and Kalaignar TV. His debut film was En Kadhal Devathai was ready to release in 2011, it remained unreleased. In 2020, he acted in a second movie Kannum Kannum Kollaiyadithaal directed by Desingh Periyasamy with Dulquer Salmaan playing the lead role.

== Personal life ==
Rakshan's father died when he was a teenager. After completing his unreleased debut movie En Kadhal Devathai, he started his video jockey career in Raj TV. He is married to Saranya and has a daughter.

== Filmography ==
=== Films ===
Key
†	Denotes films that have not yet been released

Year	Film	Role	Notes	Ref
2011	En Kadhal Devathai		Unreleased	
2020	Kannum Kannum Kollaiyadithaal	Kallis	Tamil Nadu State Film Award for Best Comedian	
2024	Marakkuma Nenjam	Karthik		
2024	Vettaiyan	Tharan		
2026	Hot Spot 2 Much	James	Anthology film; segment "Dear Fan"	
2026	Idhayam Murali	Prabhu		
2026	Kannivedi †		Filming	

=== Web series ===
Year	Film	Role	Notes
2024	My Perfect Husband	Vaseegaran	

=== Television ===
Year	Show	Role	Notes
2015-2016	Kalakka Povathu Yaaru? (season 5)	Host	Hosted alongside Jacquline
2016-2017	Kalakka Povathu Yaaru? (season 6)	Host	Hosted alongside Jacquline
2017-2018	Kalakka Povathu Yaaru? (season 7)	Host	Hosted alongside Jacquline
2018-2019	Jodi Fun Unlimited	Contestant	Paired with Jacquline (6th Place)
2019	Ready Steady Po	Host	
2019	Thaazhampoo	Prospective Groom for Revathi	
2019	Cooku with Comali Season 1	Host	
2019	Kalakka Povathu Yaaru? Champions 2	Host	
2018	Adhu Idhu Yedhu	Guest Performer in Siricha Pochu	
2019	Start Music	Participant	
2020-2021	Cooku with Comali Season 2	Host	Awarded "Darling of CWC 2"
2021	KPY Comedy Thiruvizha	Host	
2021	Varutha Padatha Valibar Sangam	Host	Prelude show for sixth annual Vijay Television Awards
2021	Comedy Raja Kalakkal Rani	Host	Comedy Show
2022	Cook with Comali season 3	Host	
2023	Cook with Comali season 4	Host	
2023	Ready Steady Po	Host	
2024	Cook with Comali Season 5	Host	
2024	Pandigai Palagaram Are U Ready	Host	
2025	Cooku with Comali Season 6		

== Awards and nominations ==
Year	Award	Category	Work	Result	Ref
2017	Vijay Television Awards	Favourite Anchor - Male	Kalakka Povathu Yaaru? (season 6)	Won	
2021	Behindwoods Gold Icon Awards	Most promising for the big screen- Male	Cooku with Comali Season 2	Won	
2021	South Indian International Movie Awards	Best Debutant Actor	Kannum Kannum Kollayiadithaal	Nominated	
2022	7th Annual Vijay Television Awards	Best Anchor - Male	Cooku with Comali (season 3)	Won	
2022	The Galatta Crown Awards	Best Supporting Actor - Male (2020–2021)	Kannum Kannum Kollayiadithaal	Won	
