= Erode Mahesh =

Indian television personality and actor

- Born: 15 October 1981 (age 45); Erode, Tamil Nadu, India
- Occupations: Television presenter, actor, video jockey, college professor
- Known for: Kalakka Povathu Yaaru ?, Naduvula Konjam Disturb Pannuvom, sirripu da
- Spouse: Sri Devi

Erode Mahesh is an Indian television presenter, actor, writer, comedian, video jockey and educator. He is well known for his works in the television field and is currently serving as one of the judges in the comedy premiere show, Kalakka Povathu Yaaru? which is broadcast on Star Vijay alongside Thadi Balaji, Priyanka Deshpande, Mimicry Sethu and Aarthi. Mahesh has also acted in supportive roles through few Tamil films after making his film acting debut in the 2012 film, Sattam Oru Iruttarai. He also appeared as a lead actor in the 2017 film, Inayathalam alongside Ganesh Venkatraman. Erode Mahesh is also known for his Tamil phrase, Adra Adra when encouraging the performers in television shows.

== Career ==
=== Teaching career ===
Mahesh previously worked as a Tamil school teacher before entering into television and film industry. He has also mentioned that being friendly with his students paved a successful way to his career as a professor and also hinted out that he would not regret his teaching career instead of being a media professional. During his teaching career, he gave an emotional speech in Visu'win Arattai Arangam.

=== Television career ===
He made his television debut when he joined as a contestant for the show, Asatha Povathu Yaaru? which was aired in Sun TV and performed as a standup comedian. He later joined Vijay TV after gaining fame through Asathapovathu Yaaru? and went onto become an anchor through the television show, Jodi Number One during its 8th season along with Ramya. He also served as an anchor in the breakthrough Vijay TV premiere show 60 Nodi! Are You Ready? and was nominated for the Vijay Television Awards for Favourite Anchor Male for the particular show at the 2014 Vijay Television Awards. Mahesh along with Ramya were nominated for the Vijay Television Awards for Favourite Anchor Pair Non Fiction at the 2015 Vijay Television Awards.

Erode Mahesh also worked as an anchor alongside Thadi Balaji for the Vijay TV premiere show, Naduvula Konjam Disturb Pannuvom and was also nominated for the Vijay Television Awards for Favourite Anchor Male for the second time in his anchoring career during the 2017 Vijay Television Awards. He alongside Balaji won the Vijay Television Awards for Favourite Anchor Pair Non Fiction for the standout show, Naduvula Konjam Disturb Pannuvom in the 2017 Vijay TV Awards. During the 2014 Vijay Television Awards, both Balaji and Erode Mahesh were nominated for the Vijay Television Awards for Favourite Screen Pair for Naduvula Konjam Disturb Pannuvom.

Apart from anchoring he also served as one of the primary judges in the Vijay TV show, Kalakka Povathu Yaaru? in the 5th, 6th and 7th editions of the premiere show.

== Filmography ==
=== Films ===
Year	Film	Role	Notes
2012	Sattam Oru Iruttarai	Kumar	Debut film
2013	Summa Nachunu Irukku	Gunaseelan	
2014	Sigaram Thodu	Adhi Moolan	
2016	Jumbulingam 3D	Sagunam	
2017	Inayathalam	Ganapathy	
2024	Thiru.Manickam	Himself	Cameo appearance

=== Television ===
Year	Title	Role	Channel	Ref.
2018	Kings of Comedy Juniors	Judge	Vijay TV	
