= Grace Karunas =

Indian playback singer and actress

- Born: 7 December 1975 (age 50); Chennai, India
- Genre: Playback singing
- Occupations: Singer, actress
- Years active: 2004–present

Grace Karunas (born 7 December 1970) is an Indian playback singer, and actress who has worked in the Indian film industry. The wife of actor Karunas, Grace has often sung in films featuring her husband.

== Career ==
Grace began singing at the age of five with the CSI Church, Poonamallee. She continued singing with her church and at college and caught the interest of actor Karunas during an intercollegiate competition, which the actor had come to judge. Karunas subsequently asked Grace to perform songs in his independent albums, and the pair later got married.

Her first film song was "Cheena Thaana Doi" in the Kamal Haasan-starrer Vasool Raja MBBS (2004), and she received the opportunity after Karunas had recommended her to the film's director Saran and music composer Bharadwaj. The success of the song made her popular and she soon worked on other songs including "Velaku Onnu Thiriya Paakudhu" from Devathaiyai Kanden (2004), "Alappuzha Ammani Allo" from Karka Kasadara (2005), "Freeya Vidu Maamu" in Aaru (2005), "Vaadi En Kappa Kezhange" in Sandai (2008) and "Aaada Varum Ulagathula" in Pandi (2008). In the 2010s, she has usually sung for films where Karunas has starred in the lead role. Along with her work in films, Grace has often performed as a live musician in stage shows.

Grace has also worked as an actress in films, notably appearing in Thiruvilaiyaadal Aarambam (2006) and Kathakali (2016) in supporting roles.

== Personal life ==
Grace is married to actor and politician Karunas, whose films she has often worked on as a singer. Their son, Ken Karunas, has also appeared in films as an actor. She participated as one of the cook in Cooku with Comali season 3 (Vijay Television).

== Notable discography ==
Year	Song title	Film	Music director	Co-artist(s)
2004	"Cheena Thana (Siruchi)"	Vasool Raja MBBS	Bharadwaj	
2004	"Velakku Onnu"	Devathaiyai Kanden	Deva	Yugendran
2005	"Alappuzha"	Karka Kasadara	Prayog	
2005	"Freeya Vudu"	Aaru	Devi Sri Prasad	Jassie Gift, Vadivelu, Mukesh Mohamed, M. L. R. Karthikeyan
2008	"Vaadi En Kappa Kezhange"	Sandai	Dhina	Sundar C
2008	"Aaada Varum Ulagathula"	Pandi	Srikanth Deva	Senthildass Velayutham
2008	"Dindukallu Dindukallu"	Dindigul Sarathy	Dhina	Anthony Daasan, Chinnaponnu
2008	"Dindukallu Remix"	Dindigul Sarathy	Dhina	Anthony Daasan, Chinnaponnu, Blaaze
2009	"Katthirikka"	Rajadhi Raja	Karunas	Karunas
2010	"Poo Pookkum"	Ambasamuthiram Ambani	Karunas	
2010	"Dhanda Dhandapani"	Ambasamuthiram Ambani	Karunas	
2011	"Nainavukku"	Kasethan Kadavulada	Karunas	
2011	"Discovukku"	Kasethan Kadavulada	Karunas	Anthony Daasan
2013	"Ragalapuram"	Ragalaipuram	Srikanth Deva	Srikanth Deva
2013	"Sudamani"	Ragalaipuram	Srikanth Deva	V. M. Mahalingam
2016	"Thittadhe"	Thirunaal	Srikanth Deva	
2016	"Thathalakka"	Enakku Innoru Per Irukku	G. V. Prakash Kumar	
2026	"Alapuzha Sandhayila"	Youth	G. V. Prakash Kumar	

== Filmography ==
- Thiruvilaiyaadal Aarambam (2006)
- Kathakali (2016)

=== Television ===
Year	Show	Role	Channel	Language
2017-2020	Kalakka Povathu Yaaru? Champions	Judge	Star Vijay	Tamil
2022	Cooku with Comali (season 3)	Contestant	Star Vijay	Tamil
2024	Super Singer 10	Guest	Star Vijay	Tamil
2025	Divine Singer Junior	Judge	Madha TV	Tamil
