= Rithika Tamil Selvi =

Indian television actress

- Born: Coimbatore, Tamil Nadu, India
- Other name: Rithika
- Occupation: Actress
- Years active: 2018 – present
- Spouse: Vinu (m. 2022)
- Children: 1

Rithika Tamil Selvi is an Indian television actress who predominantly appears in Tamil television shows. She is well known for appearing on the comedy-cooking show Cooku With Comali. She is the first runner-up of the comedy reality show Comedy Raja Kalakkal Rani.

== Career ==
Rithika first appeared in the TV serial as an actress Raja Rani in 2018 playing a character named Vinothini. After her debut she played a major role in another Vijay TV serial called Baakiyalakshmi in 2020. In 2021, she participated as a contestant in the popular comedy cooking show Cooku With Comali. In 2021, she also appeared in many special shows. She later also appeared in reality shows such as Nammavar Kamal, Start Music (season 2) and Comedy Raja Kalakkal Rani which she emerged as the first runner-up.

== Personal life ==
In 2022, Rithika married a business man named Vinu. She has a daughter named Nila

== Television ==
| Year | Show | Role | Notes |
|---|---|---|---|
| 2018–2019 | Raja Rani | Vinodini | |
| 2019–2020 | Siva Manasula Sakthi | Archana | |
| 2019–2020 | Chocolate | Amrudha a.k.a. Ammu | |
| 2020–2021 | Thirumagal | Megathi Kesavan | |
| 2020–2021 | Cooku with Comali | Contestant | Top 6 |
| 2020–2021 | Start Music | Contestant | Star Player |
| 2020 | 4G | | Short Film |
| 2021–2023 | Baakiyalakshmi | Amritha | |
| 2021 | Single Ponnunga | Herself | |
| 2021 | Nammavar kamal | Herself | Guest |
| 2021 | Comedy Raja Kalakkal Rani | Herself | 1st Runner-Up |
| 2022 | Raju Vootla Party | Herself | |
| 2022 | Pandian Stores | Amritha | Special appearance |

== Films ==
- Sattam En Kaiyil (2024) - Nivetha, Gautham's sister
