= Sandy (choreographer) =

Indian actor and choreographer (born 1986)

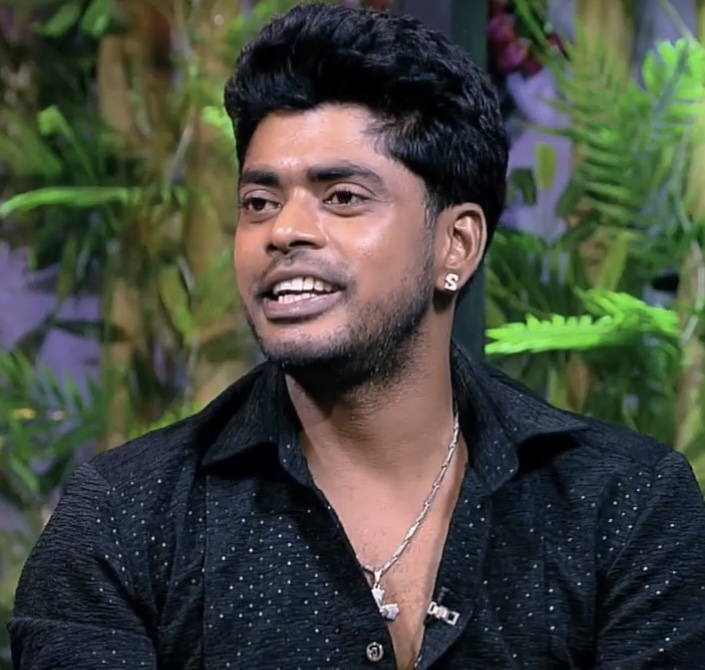
- Sandy in 2019
- Born: A. Santhosh Kumar; July 5, 1986 (age 40); Chennai, Tamil Nadu, India
- Occupations: Actor; choreographer
- Years active: 2005 – present
- Spouse(s): Kaajal Pasupathi (m. 2008; div. 2012) Dorathy Sylvia (m. 2017)
- Children: 2
- Awards: Kalaimamani (2023)

A. Santhosh Kumar (born 5 July 1986), known professionally as Sandy, is an Indian actor and choreographer who works in Tamil and Malayalam films and television. He starred in films such as Leo (2023), Niram Marum Ulagil (2025) and Lokah Chapter 1: Chandra (2025), Bha Bha Ba (2025) and Parimala and Co (2026).

Sandy gained popularity in Tamil films for his dance choreography in "Pathala Pathala" and "Monica", and special appearance songs in films like Love Today. In 2019, Sandy participated as a contestant on the reality television show Bigg Boss 3 and emerged as the runner-up.

== Career ==
=== Early work (2005-2019) ===
He choreographed for actor Sathish Krishnan and Jayashree throughout the season. He is one of the judges in Kings of Dance season 2. He worked as a choreographer for the Telugu and Kannada language shows Challenge Show and Kuniyona Bara.

He started his choreography career in Tamil film industry through the film Aaaah in 2014. Later he choreographed Viraivil Isai, Ivanuku Thannila Gandam and Vaalu in 2015. He also choreographed for the movies Saagasam, Jithan 2 and Gethu. He further went on to choreograph songs for Rajinikanth in the 2018 film Kaala. As an actor, Sandy made his debut in the movie Ivanuku Thannila Gandam, a comedy film featuring Deepak Dinkar.

In 2019, Sandy appeared in the reality television show Bigg Boss 3 on Star Vijay as a contestant, finishing as the runner up.

=== Further career (2019-present) ===
In 2021, he appeared in the horror film 3:33 as the lead. A reviewer of The Times of India stated, "The film then throws stuff like semi-evil numbers, mediums who communicate with ghosts and more scenes with Kathir [Sandy] that may or may not be bad dreams, but by then, the film stops being truly scary and turns exhausting". In 2023, he appeared in the film Leo alongside actor Vijay where Sandy portrays the character of a robber.

In 2022, Sandy was the initial cast for the role Samson in the Kannada film Head Bush which starred Dhananjaya. However he opted out of the role and was replaced by Balu Nagendra.

In 2025, Sandy choreographed the song "Monica" for the Tamil film Coolie. Then he made his Malayalam debut in the superheroine film Lokah Chapter 1: Chandra as the antagonist, Sub inspector Nachiyappa Gowda. It emerged as the highest grossing Malayalam film of all time. He is also playing a role in the Kathanar: The Wild Sorcerer alongside Jayasurya and Anushka Shetty. He also made his Telugu debut in the horror film Kishkindapuri as the antagonist Vishrawaputra.

Sandy also signed a role with Malayalam director Dhananjay Shankar in the action thriller film Bha. Bha. Ba.. In 2026, he announced his lead role in a Tamil alongside Kavin and Priyanka Mohan which is currently undergoing filming and production and is titled #Kavin09.

== Personal life ==
Sandy married actress Kaajal Pasupathi in 2008, however the couple later decided to divorce in 2012. He later married social media influencer Dorathy Sylvia in 2017 and have 2 children.

== Filmography ==
Key
†	Denotes films that have not yet been released

=== Actor ===
Year	Title	Role	Language	Notes	Ref.
2014	Aaaah	Himself	Tamil	Special appearance in the song "Kannaadithanda"	
2015	Ivanuku Thannila Gandam	Maika Mahesh	Tamil		
2016	Gethu	Himself	Tamil	Special appearance in the song "Mutta Bajji"	
2016	Ka Ka Ka Po	Himself	Tamil	Special appearance	
2017	Julieum 4 Perum	Dimple Raj	Tamil		
2019	Thanimai	Advocate Govindhan	Tamil		
2021	3:33	Kathir	Tamil		
2021	Parris Jeyaraj	Himself	Tamil	Special appearance in the song "Puli Manga Pulipu"	
2022	Love Today	Himself	Tamil	Special appearance in the song "Saachitale"	
2023	Dada	Himself	Tamil	Special appearance in the song "Namma Thamizh Folku"	
2023	DD Returns	Himself	Tamil	Special appearance in the song "French Kuthu"	
2023	Let's Get Married	Guruji's follower	Tamil		
2023	Leo	Robber	Tamil		
2024	Hot Spot	Siddharth	Tamil		
2025	Dragon	Warden	Tamil	Special appearance in the song "Maatikinaaru Orutharu"	
2025	Niram Marum Ulagil	Anbu	Tamil		
2025	Lokah Chapter 1: Chandra	Inspector Nachiyappa Gowda	Malayalam	Malayalam debut	
2025	Kishkindhapuri	Visravaputra	Telugu	Telugu debut	
2025	Bha. Bha. Ba.	ACP Ashkar Ahammed	Malayalam		
2026	TN 2026	Sivalinga's son	Tamil	Special appearance	
2026	Karuppu	Cafe Customer	Tamil	Cameo Appearance	
2026	Parimala and Co	Varghese	Tamil		
2027	Kathanar: The Wild Sorcerer †	TBA	Malayalam		
TBA	Rosy †	TBA	Kannada	Kannada debut	
TBA	Gift †	TBA	Tamil		
TBA	Kavin 09 †	TBA	Tamil		
TBA	Superhero †	TBA	Tamil		

Music videos

Year	Film	Song	Ref.
2023	Varisu	"Thee Thalapathy"	
2023	—N/a	"Danger Queen"	
2025	Kadhal Reset Repeat	"Yamma Ghajini"	

=== Partial choreography ===
Year	Film	Notes
2014	Aaaah	Cameo
2015	Ivanuku Thannila Gandam	Also actor
2015	Viraivil Isai	Cameo
2015	Vaalu	
2016	Gethu	Cameo
2016	Saagasam	
2016	Jithan 2	
2016	Jambulingam 3D	
2016	Ka Ka Ka Po	Cameo
2016	Virumandikkum Sivanandikkum	
2018	Kaala	
2018	Sandakozhi 2	
2018	Pariyerum Perumal	
2019	Sarvam Thaala Mayam	
2019	Dhilluku Dhuddu 2	
2019	Irandam Ulagaporin Kadaisi Gundu	
2020	Pallu Padama Paathuka	
2020	Ayngaran	
2021	Jail	
2022	Vikram	
2022	Naai Sekar	
2023	Dada	Cameo
2024	Aavesham	Malayalam film
2024	Thangalaan	
2025	Thug Life	
2025	Coolie	
2025	They Call Him OG	Telugu film; "Firestorm" song
2025	Vaa Vaathiyaar	"Uyir Pathikaama" song
2026	Karuppu	

=== Television ===
Year	Programme	Role	Language	Notes
2005	Maanada Mayilada	Judge	Tamil	
2017	Bigg Boss	Himself	Tamil	Special appearance in finale
2017-2018	Kings of Dance season 2	Judge	Tamil	
2019	Bigg Boss 3	Contestant	Tamil	Runner-up
2024	Jodi Are U Ready	Judge	Tamil	
2025	Jodi Are U Ready season 2	Judge	Tamil	
2026	Bigg Boss 9	Himself	Tamil	Guest appearance for Pongal
2026–present	Jodi Are U Ready season 3	Judge	Tamil	

== Awards and nominations ==
- Kalaimamani Award - 2023
