= Dance Jodi Dance Reloaded =

- Genre: Reality; Dance show
- Presented by: RJ Vijay (Main); Manimegalai (S3); Keerthi Shanthanu (S1, Epi: 1-2)
- Judges: Sneha; Sangeetha Krish; Baba Bhaskar (S1-S2); Varalaxmi Sarathkumar (S3)
- Country of origin: India
- Original language: Tamil
- No. of seasons: 3
- No. of episodes: 36 (S1); 34 (S2); 40 (S3)

Production
- Camera setup: Multi-camera
- Running time: approx. 55-60 minutes per episode
- Production company: Monk Studios

Original release
- Network: Zee Tamil
- Release: 30 July 2022 – present

Related
- Dance Jodi Dance

Dance Jodi Dance Reloaded is a 2022 Indian Tamil-language reality television dance competition show and is part of Dance Jodi Dance. It began broadcasting on Zee Tamil from 30 July 2022.

The first season of Dance Jodi Dance Reloaded started on 30 July 2022. The second season was released on 23 December 2023. The third season is scheduled to be released on March 1, 2025.

== Seasons overview ==
Season	Episodes	Original Broadcast		Winner	1st Runner up
Season	Episodes	First Aired	Last Aired	Winner	1st Runner up
1	36	30 July 2022	11 December 2022	Vaishnavi & Avinash Ashok	Dominic & Preetha
2	34	23 December 2023	14 April 2024	Akshatha & Naveen	Ibrahim & Akshitha Ashok
3	40	1 March 2025	20 July 2025	Nithin & Ditya Bhande	Thillai & Preetha

== Season 1 ==
It started on 30 July 2022 and ended on 11 December 2022 with Vaishnavi and Avinash Ashok as the winners. The judges were Sneha, Sangeetha Krish and Baba Bhaskar with RJ Vijay as the host.

The grand finale consisted of two rounds. The final episode was aired 3 hours on 11 December 2022, and ended with 36 Episodes. Several guests that included in the grand finale are Sivakarthikeyan, Robo Shankar and Amir.

Prize Winners:

- Title Winners of Dance Jodi Dance Reloaded : Vaishnavi & Avinash (₹5,00,000)
- 1st Runner-up : Dominic & Preetha (₹3,00,000)
- 2nd Runner-up : Kenny & Niharika (₹2,00,000)

=== Top 4 Contestants (Finalist) ===
Name	Result	Place
Vaishnavi & Avinash	Winner	1st
Dominic & Preetha	1st Runner-up	2nd
Kenny & Niharika	2nd Runner-up	3rd
Akila & Britto Mano	3rd Runner-up	4th

=== Contestants ===
#	Contestants	Celebrity partner
1	Dominic	Preetha Suresh
2	Janmoni Doley	Anand Pandi
3	Akila	Britto Mano
4	Vaishnavi	Puvi Arasu / Avinash
5	Pasupathi	Rhema Ashok
6	Saravana	Sree Nidhi
7	Nagaraj	Pranika Dhakshu / Akshitha
8	Sahana	Yokesh
9	Saravana Muthu	VJ Sangeetha/ Dheeshika
10	Kenny	Saai Gayathri / Niharika
11	Namrytha	Sugi Vijay
12	Manikandan	Vaishali Thaniga

=== Guest ===
- Episode 1: Oviya
- Episode 3: Prabhu Deva
- Episode 3: Jiiva
- Episode 11: Arya
- Episode 22: Khushbu

== Season 2 ==
Dance Jodi Dance Reloaded
- Season 2
- Hosted by: RJ Vijay
- Judges: Sneha; Baba Bhaskar; Sangeetha Krish
- Winners: Akshatha & Naveen
- No. of episodes: 34

Release
- Original network: Zee Tamil
- Original release: 23 December 2023 – 14 April 2024

Season chronology
- ← Previous; Season 1 Next → Season 3

The second season of Dance Jodi Dance Reloaded airs on every Saturday and Sunday at 19:00 PM on Zee Tamil from 23 December 2023, and streams on Zee5. RJ Vijay return as host for this season. The judging panel for this season includes four judges: one choreographer Baba Bhaskar, and two film actress, Sneha and Sangeetha Krish and one film director, screenwriter and actor S. J. Suryah as special guest for episode 1.

The grand finale consisted of two rounds. The final episode was aired 3 hours on 14 April 2024, and ended with 34 Episodes. Several guests that included in the grand finale are Raghava Lawrence, Ashok Raja and Sridhar. The season title winner are Akshatha and Naveen.

Prize Winners:

- Title Winners of Dance Jodi Dance Reloaded 2 : Akshatha & Naveen (₹5,00,000)
- 1st Runner-up : Ibrahim & Akshitha Ashok (₹3,00,000)
- 2nd Runner-up : Gowri Gopan & Vivek Rajgopal (₹2,00,000)

=== Guest ===
- Episode 1, 2: S. J. Suryah
- Episode 5, 6: Prasanna, Krish
- Episode 6, 7: Raghava Lawrence
- Episode 12, 13: Shanthanu Bhagyaraj, Ashok Selvan, Keerthi Pandian
- Episode 15: Bharath
- Episode 22, 23: Namitha
- Episode 24, 25: Sridhar, Dinesh, Ashok Raja

=== Contestants ===
#	Contestants	Celebrity partner
1	Guru Smaran	Riya Vishwanathan
2	John Edwin	Risha Jacobs
3	Sureshkumar	Hemadayal
4	Poornima	Raja Vetri Prabu
5	Ibrahim	Akshitha Ashok
6	Gowri Gopan	Vivek Rajgopal
7	Priyadharshini	Udhaya Deep
8	Nagaraj	Sharanya Turadi Sundarraj
9	Anand	Nakshathra Viswanathan
10	Akshatha	Naveen
11	Prince Xavier	Pavithra
12	Swathi Nair	Sabharish Ramachandran

== Season 3 ==
The third season of Dance Jodi Dance Reloaded is an upcoming reality television dance competition show. Choreographer Baba Bhaskar and actress, Sneha has officially once again been appointed as the judged for the third time, accompanied by the new actress Varalaxmi Sarathkumar. Manimegalai and RJ Vijay as hosts of the show. It was premiered on March 1, 2025 on Zee Tamil and aired on Saturday and Sunday at 20:30, ended with 40 episodes.

The final episode was aired 3 hours on 20 July, and ended with 40 Episodes. Actor and music director Vijay Antony was as guest. The show was won by Nithin and Ditya Bhande while Thillai and Preeta emerged as the runner up of the show.

Prize Winners:

- Title Winners of Dance Jodi Dance Reloaded 2 : Nithin & Ditya Bhande (₹5,00,000)
- 1st Runner-up : Thillai & Preetha (₹2,00,000)
- 2nd Runner-up : Prajna & Gagana (₹1,00,000)

=== Contestants ===
#	Contestants	Celebrity partner
1	Dileep	Mercina
2	Prajna	Gagana
3	Panjami	Kathir
4	Aditi	Sugesh (2nd Week) / Maanas (Week 3-14)
5	Arun	Kemi
6	Mohan	Shreya
7	Alwin	Parveen
8	Janushika	Sabarish
9	Nithin	Ditya Bhande
10	Prakash	Raveena Daha
11	Krithika	deepak
12	Thillai	Preeta

=== Production ===
Following two seasons, Choreographer Baba Bhaskar and actress Sneha returned as judges. Actress Varalaxmi Sarathkumar replaced actress Sangeetha Krish as the new judge this season. RJ Vijay returned to host, accompanied by the new Manimegalai.
