= Jodi Are U Ready season 3 =

Jodi Are U Ready
- Season 3
- Hosted by: Angelin; Rakshan
- Judges: Sandy; Rambha; Sridevi Vijaykumar
- No. of contestants: 12
- No. of episodes: 26

Release
- Original network: Star Vijay
- Original release: 7 February – 3 May 2026

Season chronology
- ← Previous; Season 2 Next → Season 4

Jodi Are U Ready season 3 is the third season of the Indian Tamil-language dance reality show Jodi Are U Ready. The show is a competition wherein 12 talented male dancers with television and film celebrities are paired up. The couples compete against each other.

Angelin has officially once again been appointed as the host for the third time, accompanied by the new Rakshan. The judging panel for this season included three judges: two celebrity actresses, Rambha and Sridevi Vijaykumar and choreographer Sandy. The season premiered on Star Vijay from 7 February 2026 on every Saturday and Sunday at 18:30, which then was replaced by Super Singer 11 show. It is also available for streaming on Disney+ Hotstar.

The finale episode aired on 3 May 2026. The season was won by Chathat and Rahul master, and the runner-up was Harshitha achari and Varatha.

== Contestants ==
#	Jodi		Choreographer	Week entered	Week exited	Status	Zone	Elimination faced	Top Jodi	Rocked Power Performance
#	Kings	Queens	Choreographer	Week entered	Week exited	Status	Zone	Elimination faced	Top Jodi	Rocked Power Performance
1	Shanshank	Chathat	Rahul master	Week 3	Week 13	Winner	-	1	4	4
2	Anish	Harshitha achari	Varatha master	Week 3	Week 13	1st Runner-Up	-		4	5
3	Jitheesh	Harshitha	Raymond Master	Week 3	Week 13	2nd Runner-Up	-	1		1
4	Jebin	Sharmi	Rahul master	Week 3	Week 13	3rd Runner-Up	-			1
5	Soorya	Gopika	Varatha master	Week 3	Week 13	4th Runner-Up	-	1		3
6	Sujith	Pavithra	Raymond master	Week 3	Week 12	Evicted	Diamond Zone			2
7	Ibrahim	Anjali	Varatha master	Week 3	Week 12	Evicted	Diamond Zone	2	1	1
8	Nesamani	Sandhana	Raymond master	Week 3	Week 12	Evicted	Diamond Zone		1	1
9	Bharathi raj	Mridhula	varatha master	Week 3	Week 9	Evicted	Gold Zone	3		1
10	Prince	Dhakshitha	Rahul master	Week 3	Week 8	Evicted	Gold Zone	2		
11	Pramoth	Aboli	varatha master	Week 3	Week 5	Evicted	Silver Zone	2		
12	Dileep	Gracy	Rahul master	Week 3	Week 4	Evicted	Silver Zone	2		

== Selection Process ==
Queens all arrived in first week and judges gave them 100 coins to use bid. Kings selected by queens in second week using bidding process.

== Episodes ==
Week	Episodes	Airing	Round	Notes	Top Jodi of the week
Week 1	1	7 February 2026	Grand Launch	None	
Week 1	2	8 February 2026	Grand Launch	None	
Week 2	3	14 February 2026	Jodi Selection Round	Vinoth and Aurora are special guests	
Week 2	4	15 February 2026	Jodi Selection Round	Vinoth and Aurora are special guests	
Week 3	5	21 February 2026	Single to Mingle	Mirchi Shiva is special guest	Anish & Harshitha
Week 3	6	22 February 2026	Single to Mingle	Mirchi Shiva is special guest	Anish & Harshitha
Week 4	7	28 February 2026	Hook step	None	Anish & Harshitha
Week 4	8	1 March 2026	Hook step	None	Anish & Harshitha
Week 5	9	7 March 2026	Keep in Touch	Actress Radhika Sarathkumar is special guest	Ibrahim & Anjali
Week 5	10	8 March 2026	Keep in Touch	Actress Radhika Sarathkumar is special guest	Ibrahim & Anjali
Week 6	11	14 March 2026	Prabhu deva's special	Tamil cinema's choreographers are special guests; Youth movie team for promotions	Nesamani & Chandhana
Week 6	12	15 March 2026	Prabhu deva's special	Tamil cinema's choreographers are special guests; Youth movie team for promotions	Nesamani & Chandhana
Week 7	13	21 March 2026	Mix tape	Actress Namitha is special guest	Anish & Harshitha
Week 7	14	22 March 2026	Mix tape	Actress Namitha is special guest	Anish & Harshitha
Week 8	15	28 March 2026	80s Disco	Actor Anand Babu is the special guest	Shashank & Chahat
Week 8	16	29 March 2026	80s Disco	Actor Anand Babu is the special guest	Shashank & Chahat
Week 9	17	4 April 2026	Folk themed	Kala Master is the special guest	Shashank & Chahat
Week 9	18	5 April 2026	Folk themed	Kala Master is the special guest	Shashank & Chahat
Week 10	19	11 April 2026	Glam Icon	Disco Shanti is the special guest	Anish & Harshitha
Week 10	20	12 April 2026	Glam Icon	Disco Shanti is the special guest	Anish & Harshitha
Week 11	21	18 April 2026	Devotional	None	Shashank & Chahat
Week 11	22	19 April 2026	Devotional	None	Shashank & Chahat
Week 12	23	25 April 2026	Semi-Final	Dance Battle for the last finalist position	Jebin & Sharmi
Week 12	24	26 April 2026	Semi-Final	Dance Battle for the last finalist position	Jebin & Sharmi

== Weekly performance ==
Jodi	week 3	week 4	week 5	week 6	week 7	week 8	week 9	week 10	week 11	week 12
Jebin & Sharmi	3 Greens	3 Greens	Rocky Bhai performance	2 Reds & 1 Green	3 Greens	3 Greens	3 Greens	3 Greens	3 Greens	
Anish & Harshitha	Rocky Bhai performance	Rocky Bhai performance	3 Greens	3 Greens	Rocky Bhai performance	3 Greens	Rocky Bhai performance	Rocky Bhai performance	3 Greens	
Ibrahim & Anjali	3 Reds	3 Greens	Rocky Bhai performance	2 Greens & 1 Red	No Dance	3 Greens	3 Greens	3 Reds	3 Greens	
Nesamani & Chandhana	3 Greens	2 Greens & 1 Red	3 Greens	Rocky Bhai performance	3 Greens	3 Greens	3 Greens	3 Greens	3 Greens	
Shashank & Chahat	Rocky Bhai performance	Rocky Bhai performance	3 Greens	3 Reds	3 Greens	Rocky Bhai performance	Rocky Bhai performance	3 Greens	3 Greens	
Sujith & Pavithra	3 Greens	3 Greens	2 Greens & 1 Red	3 Greens	Rocky Bhai performance	Rocky Bhai performance	3 Greens	2 Greens & 1 Red	3 Greens	
Soorya & Gopika	2 Greens & 1 Red	3 Reds	Rocky Bhai performance	3 Greens	3 Greens	2 Reds & 1 Green	3 Greens	Rocky Bhai performance	3 Greens	
Jithesh & Harshitha N	3 Greens	3 Reds	3 Reds	3 Reds	wild card performance - selected	Rocky Bhai performance	3 Greens	3 Greens	3 Greens	
Bharath Raj & Miruthula	3 Reds	3 Greens	3 Greens	Rocky Bhai performance	3 Greens	3 Reds	3 Reds			
Prince & Dhakshitha	3 Greens	3 Reds	3 Reds	3 Reds	3 Greens	3 Reds				
Pramod & Aboli	2 Reds & 1 Green	2 Greens & 1 Red	No Dance		wild card performance - rejected					
Dileep & Gracy	3 Reds	3 Reds			wild card performance - rejected					

- Judges Satisfy fulfiled by jodi's performance (Powerful)

- Judges Satisfied with jodi's performance (OK)

- Judges not Satisfied with jodi's performance (Not OK)

- No dance performance

- wild card re entered Jodi

- Eliminated Jodi

== Production ==
=== Development ===
After the Super Singer 11 show ended, Jodi Are U Ready season 3 began on 7 February 2026 as scheduled. On 19 January 2026, a promo was released on Star Vijay's social media platforms.

Sandy, Sridevi Vijaykumar and Rambha returned to the judging panel. Angelin returned as the host, but Rio Raj left and was succeeded by Rakshan.
