= Dance Jodi Dance =

- Genre: Dance show Reality
- Screenplay by: Kaushik.R
- Presented by: Deepak Dinkar (Season 1-3); Pearle Maaney (Season 3); Anjana Rangan (Season 3); Manimegalai (Season 4); Azhar (Season 4)
- Judges: Sneha (Season 1-4); Gautami (Season 1-2); Sudha Chandran (Season 1); Priyamani (Season 2); Priya Raman (Season 3); Pooja (Season 3); Namitha (Season 3); Simran (Season 4); Prashanth (Season 4)
- Opening theme: "Dance Jodi Dance Jodi"
- Country of origin: India
- Original language: Tamil
- No. of seasons: 3

Production
- Producer: S. Sabreesh Kumar
- Camera setup: Multi-camera
- Running time: approx. 55-60 minutes per episode
- Production company: Monk Studios

Original release
- Network: Zee Tamil
- Release: 17 September 2016 – present

Related
- Dance Jodi Dance season 2

Dance Jodi Dance (transl. Dance Pair Dance) is an Indian Tamil-language dance competition reality television show broadcast on Zee Tamil and from the year 2016 and also available to watch on digital platform ZEE5. This show was being judge by actress Sneha for all the seasons. The show was one of the most successful dance reality show which premiered on 17 September 2016.

As of COVID-19 pandemic, this show was comes to the end with 3 seasons and hence started with the fresh reboot version as Dance Jodi Dance Reloaded. Thus the show follows this title in upcoming seasons from the first.

The new version of Dance Jodi Dance features an all-women contest lineup for the first time, premiered on Zee Tamil on 13 June 2026, and airs every Saturday and Sunday at 19:00. Also, available for streaming on ZEE5. Sneha, Simran and Prashanth as Judges.

== Seasons overview ==
Season	Episodes	Original Broadcast		Winner	1st Runner up
Season	Episodes	First Aired	Last Aired	Winner	1st Runner up
1	40	2 May 2016	21 September 2016	Meesha & Jeevan	Yuthan & Nancy
2	51	2 December 2017	26 May 2018	Ruth & Rinish Raj	Krishnamoorthy & Raveena Daha
3	41	16 November 2019	29 March 2020	The grand finale didn't take place due to COVID-19	
4	TBA	13 June 2026	present		

== Season 1 ==
Season 1 was premiered on 17 September 2016. The Show is hosted by Deepak Dinkar while Actress Sneha, Gautami and Accomplished Bharatanatyam dancer Sudha Chandran are the judges of the show.

The Grand finale event was held at Nehru stadium chennai on 27 January 2017. The winners are listed below

- Title Winners of Dance Jodi Dance 1:0 : Meesha and Jeevan
- 1st Runner-up : Yuthan and Nancy
- 2nd Runner-up : Raaghav and Reshma
- 3rd Runner-up : Sai Priyanka Ruth and Arun
- Finalist : Myna Nandhini and Yogesh

=== Contestants ===
A Tamil celebrities, mostly TV actors are paired with new dancers handpicked through auditions will go head to head in their quest to be best performers.

#	Contestants	Celebrity partner
1	Arun Jackson	Sai Priyanka Ruth
2	Reshma Muralidharan	Raaghav
3	Naveen	Anuya Bhagvath
4	VJ Kathir	Abhirami Venkatachalam; Swetha (from episode 7)
5	Yogesh	Myna Nandhini
6	Jeevan	Misha Ghoshal
7	Arivalagan	V. J. Chitra
8	Nash	Sandra Amy
9	Vikas	Sanjana Singh
10	Ashwini	Madhan Pandian
11	Archana	Siddarth Kumar
12	Nancy	Yuthan Balaji

== Season 2 ==
The second season aired on every Saturday and Sunday at 20:00 from 2 December 2017 to 26 May 2018 and ended with 49 Episodes. Actress Sneha has officially once again been appointed as the judge with new judge Gautami and Priyamani. Deepak Dinkar as the hosts. The season title winner is Ruth and Rinish Raj.

- Title Winners of Dance Jodi Dance 2:0 : Ruth & Rinish Raj (₹5,00,000)
- 1st Runner-up : Krishnamoorthy & Raveena Daha (₹3,30,000)
- 2nd Runner-up : Deva & Deeshika (₹2,25,000)
- 3rd Runner-up : Kaali & Meghna Vincent

=== Contestants ===
A total of twelve celebrities, mostly TV actors, are paired with dancers handpicked through auditions and will go head to head in their quest to be best performers.

#	Contestants	Celebrity partner
1	Pavithra	Puvi Arasu
2	Kaali	Meghna Vincent
3	Jerome	Reshma Muralidharan
4	Keerthana	Shyam
5	Avinash	Meghna
6	Ruth	Renish
7	Krishnamoorthy	Raveena Daha
8	(HipHop) Karthik	Abhinaya Shree
9	Deva	Ramya; Deeshika (replaced Ramya)
10	Jessie	Vinoth Kishan
11	Karthik	Lassiya
12	Renisha	Karthick Ashokan

== Season 3 ==
The third season aired on every Saturday and Sunday at 18:30 from 2 December 2017 and which has been halted due to COVID-19 pandemic situation on 29 March 2020 with 41 episodes. Sneha, Priya Raman, Pooja and Namitha as the judges, Deepak Dinkar, Pearle Maaney and Anjana Rangan as the hosts.

=== Contestants ===
#	Contestants	Celebrity partner
1	Santhosh Arockiraj	Ragasya
2	Sathish Kumar	Tejashree
3	Vinu	Koli Ramya
4	Venkat	Nachathira
4	Mohan	Iraa Agarwal
6	Sharath	Anandhi Ajay
7	Sujith Kumar	Gayatri Rema
8	Nayana Joshan	Vinoth Kishan
9	Pavithra	Wong
10	Deepika	Vivek Rajgopal
11	Preetha Suresh	Venkatesh
12	Anitha	Shivaji
13	Arunima Sudhakar	Kishore DS

== Season 4 ==
Dance Jodi Dance season 4, the fourth season of Dance Jodi Dance, premiered on Zee Tamil on13 June 2026, with episodes telecasting Saturdays-Sundays at 7:00 PM IST. For this season, the hosts of this show are Manimegalai and Azhar. And the judging panel consists of three judges: Simran, Sneha and Prashanth.

== Spin-off ==
=== Dance Jodi Dance Reloaded ===
Dance Jodi Dance was ended with Season 3 and started with the reboot / Spin-off version as DJD Reloaded which was premiered on 30 July 2022. The show was hosted by RJ Vijay while Actress Sneha, Sangeetha and Choreographer Baba Bhaskar are the judges of the show.

- Title Winners of Dance Jodi Dance Reloaded : Vaishnavi & Avinash (₹5,00,000)
- 1st Runner-up : Dominic & Preetha (₹3,00,000)
- 2nd Runner-up : Kenny & Niharika (₹2,00,000)

=== Contestants ===
#	Contestants	Celebrity partner
1	Dominic	Preetha Suresh
2	Janmoni Doley	Anand Pandi
3	Akila	Britto Mano
4	Vaishnavi	Puvi Arasu / Avinash
5	Pasupathi	Rhema Ashok
6	Saravana	Sree Nidhi
7	Nagaraj	Pranika Dhakshu / Akshitha
8	Sahana	Yokesh
9	Saravana Muthu	VJ Sangeetha/ Dheeshika
10	Kenny	Saai Gayathri / Niharika
11	Namrytha	Sugi Vijay
12	Manikandan	Vaishali Thaniga

== COVID-19 outbreak in India ==
Dance Jodi Dance 3.0, the third season of the show was premiered on 16 November 2019, which has been halted due to COVID-19 pandemic situation on 29 March 2020 with 41 episodes. Later the channel decided to launch the third season again with the revamp as Dance Jodi Dance Reloaded with different contestants on 2022.
