= Mouna Raagam (Tamil TV series) =

Indian musical television series

- Genre: Musical; Drama; Family drama
- Written by: Priya Thambi
- Directed by: Thai Selvam; Manoj Kumar
- Starring: B Kritika Iyer; Sherin Farhana; Rajeev Parameshwar; Chippy Renjith; Shamitha Shreekumar
- Theme music composer: M. Jayachandran (Title Song); Harinarayanan (lyrics); Sananth George (Background Score)
- Opening theme: "Odum Meenum Ketkum"; Palani Bharathi (lyrics)
- Country of origin: India
- Original language: Tamil
- No. of episodes: 1380

Production
- Producer: Chippy Renjith
- Production locations: Ponmudi, Kerala; Trivandrum, Kerala
- Cinematography: C. Jaya Kumar; Ve.ki Amirtha Raj; Saravanan; Venkatesh
- Editor: G.Pa Vinoth
- Camera setup: Multi-camera
- Running time: 22–24 min
- Production company: Global Villagers

Original release
- Network: Star Vijay
- Release: 24 April 2017 – 17 March 2023

Related
- Mouna Raagam 2

Mouna Raagam (transl. Silent Symphony) is an Indian Tamil-language musical drama series that premiered on 24 April 2017 on Star Vijay and ended on 17 March 2023, and digitally streams on Disney+ Hotstar. The show is produced by actress Chippy Renjith under Global Villagers. The series has two seasons, with the first season of the story starring the seven-year-old Sakthi (Krithika Khelge), who is born with a talent. It is the official remake of the Bengali language series Potol Kumar Gaanwala.

Its first season stars B Krithika Iyer and Sherin Farhana with Rajeev Parameshwar, Chippy Renjith and Shamitha Shreekumar After a 12-year leap, it continues as Mouna Raagam 2, stars Raveena Daha and Shilpa Nair with Rajeev Parameshwar, Chippy Renjith and Anusree Chembakassery additionally with Salmanul Faris and Rahul Ramachandran.

== Series overview ==
Series	Episodes	Originally released	
Series	Episodes	First released	Last released
1	863	24 April 2017	19 September 2020
2	517	1 February 2021	17 March 2023

== Synopsis ==
Kadhambari (Kaadhu), an impatient, argumentative women, was the second wife of Karthik Krishna, a celebrated singer. Years later, Shruthi, the daughter of the couple, was born. As the story unfolds, it was revealed that before Karthik was married to Kadambari, he fell for a simple village girl, Mallika, and even married her at a temple in Kutralam. Circumstances force Karthik to leave the village, and under intense pressure from his family, he marries Kadhambari, abandoning Mallika and leaving her to raise their daughter, Sakthi, alone. Mallika—scarred by betrayal—discourages her daughter from pursuing singing, fearing it will lead to the same heartbreak she endured. Mallika often gets headaches and breaks out when Sakthi asks for her father. According to the legend, Mallika fainted while chasing Sakthi. While receiving treatment at a local hospital, a haunting nightmare taunts her. Shortly after, a tragic accident kills Mallika on the highway. Since her dead body was nowhere to be found, the villagers had believed that she was dead and performed her final rites. Devastated, Sakthi starts working at a hotel to escape from sorrow. Meanwhile, Sakthi's maternal aunt, Swarna, tries to exploit her ability to sing and not only leaving the poor girl just like that, she also burnt some of the sarees worn by Mallika to avoid Sakthi from even thinking of her. Tired of the torture, the girl runs away from the village and reaches Chennai in disguise of a male. Sakthi stayed at an orphanage for the time being. On the other hand, Swarna still did not give up and used every single opportunity possible to kidnap Sakthi. Fortunately, the presence of more adults present in the district kept her safe, away from anguish.

And there begins the next story of Sakthi's life where destiny forces Velan (Sakthi) to land in Karthik (her father)'s house.

Murali, Karthik's Elder Brother, had married a woman named Nandhini. 17 Years later, they still did not have any kids. Both had a talk and decided to adopt one. And that's when Murali saw Sakthi (Velan). Impressed with Sakthi (Velan)'s talent, Murali decides to take him home but the kid refuses to consider Nandini as her mother. With time, problems resolve and Sakthi reveals her true happiness with Murali and Karthik. Kadambari, on the other hand, hated Velan and wanted Shruthi to overcome his talents in order to grab more attention from the household. Not even thinking twice, Kadhambari spread false rumours against Velan. Nandhini and her in laws were filled with hatred and always lashed out on Velan as per Kadhambari's plans. Despite Nandhini, Parvathy, Kadambari, and Vishwanathan's protests, Murali decides to let Velan to stay at his house. Eventually, everyone in the family learn the truth and things turn back to normal. Months pass and Murali and Nandhini slowly starts to learn the truth and Velan's past; who he really his; where he was before and what his relation was to Karthik and whether he was a male or a female. However the spouse hid it from the family in fear of what Kadambari would do. After several weeks, Karthik learns that Velan is actually not Velan but Sakthi, a girl. Karthik is heartbroken in shock. He lashes out at her and refuses to acknowledge her at a singing competition. Seeing Karthik's cruel actions, Pazhani reveals who he truly his, what his relationship is to Mallika and what Sakthi's relationship is to Karthik. Overcome with guilt, Karthik finally embraces Sakthi as his child. Enraged by Sakthi’s presence, Kadhambari repeatedly attempts to harm her, leading to constant chaos in the house. Despite the turmoil, a music teacher named "Malliga" stays with Sakthi for at least 2 months. Like her, Malliga also faces torture and gets insulted by Kadambari, causing her to finally quit and move out of the house. Weeks turn into months and months turn into years, Karthik's bond with Sakthi had increased. However, it cannot be said that there were no conflicts/rifts between them. Lots came into picture; most instigated by Kadambari. Increased troubles given by her and Karthik's hesitation in picking favourites triggered Pazhani and forced him to take Sakthi back to Kutralam. Fortunately, Karthik intervenes at the last moment, convincing her to stay. Later, he decides to divorce Kadhambari upon discovering that she was responsible for Mallika’s supposed death. Soon, Murali and Pazhani reveal another shocking truth—Mallika is alive and living under the alias Karpagam. Meanwhile, Kadhambari faces another challenge—her vengeful ex-boyfriend, Raghav, torments her and threatens to take Shruthi away. In a desperate confrontation, Kadhambari accidentally kills Raghav. Out of compassion, Karpagam takes the blame, leading to her arrest.

Kadhambari arranges for Karpagam’s bail, only to uncover that she is Karthik’s first wife. A street poster provides Karthik and Sakthi with a new lead, leading them to reunite with Karpagam at the court. Having lost her memories, Mallika remains unaware of her past. In an emotional moment, Sakthi sings a heartfelt melody, successfully triggering Mallika’s lost memories. Karthik rescues her, defying Kadhambari’s protests, and brings her home. With Mallika’s return, tensions in the household intensified, leading to frequent disputes among the family members. Meanwhile, Kadhambari found herself tormented by the haunting presence of Raghav’s ghost. The situation worsened when Raghav’s mother demanded custody of Shruthi, seeking revenge for her son's death. Soon after, Shruthi was kidnapped, sending the family into a state of panic. Overcome with distress, Kadhambari collapsed, losing consciousness and temporarily forgetting everyone except the fact that Shruthi was missing.

During the search, Sakthi remained hopeful, believing that Shruthi would eventually be found. When the girl was finally rescued, Kadhambari regained her awareness upon seeing her daughter again. In that moment, she abruptly pushes Sakthi and demands for both her mother and herself to get the f*** out of the house. Following this emotional exchange, she turned to Karthik and posed the decisive question—who should remain in the house, Mallika and Sakthi or herself and Shruthi?

The emotionally charged four-year saga reached its conclusion as Mallika and Sakthi ultimately decided to leave, settling the longstanding conflict once and for all.

Also Read Mouna Raagam 2

== Cast ==
=== Main ===
- Kritika Balasubramanian as Shakti Krishna – A young music prodigy; Karthik and Mallika's daughter; Shruti's half-sister (2017-2020)
  - Raveena Daha as a grown up Sakthi (September 2020) (Cameo)
- Sherin Farhana as Shruthi Krishna – Karthik and Kadhambari's or Kadambari's and Raghav's daughter; Sakthi's elder sister (2017-2020)
- Rajeev Parameshwar as Karthik Krishna – Playback singer; Parvathy's younger son; Murali's brother; Mallika and Kadhambari's husband; Sakthi's father; Shruti's step-father. (2017-2020)
- Shamitha Shreekumar as Kaadhambari "Kaadhu Maa" Vishwanathan Krishna – Vishwanathan and Rukmani's elder daughter; Maya's sister; Raghav's ex-girlfriend; Karthik's second wife; Shruthi's mother. (2017-2020)
- Chippy Renjith as Malliga A.K.A Karpagam – Natural singer; Pazhani's sister; Karthik's first wife; Sakthi's mother. (2017-2020)

=== Recurring ===
- Manoharan Krishnan as Murali Krishna – Parvati's elder son; Karthik's brother; Nandini's husband; Shakthi's former guardian (2017–2020)
- Tamil Selvi as Nandini Chokkalingam Krishna – Chokkalingam's daughter; Murali's wife.(2017–2020)
- A. Revathy as Parvathi Krishna – Murali's and Karthik's mother; Shakthi's grandmother; Shruti's step-grandmother. (2017-2020)
- Supergood Kannan as Pazhaniswamy aka Pazhani – Mallika's brother; Swarna's husband; Nila's father; Shakthi's uncle. (2017–2020)
- Seema G. Nair as Swarna Pazhaniswamy – Pazhani's wife; Nila's mother; Shakthi's aunt.(2017–2020)
- Anjali Devi as Rukmani Vishwanathan – Vishwanathan's wife; Kadhambari and Maya's mother; Shruthi's grandmother.
- Anand Babu as Vishwanathan – Rukmani's husband; Kaadhambari and Maya's father; Shruthi's grandfather. (2017–2020)
- Sesu as Maya Vishwanathan – Vishwanathan and Rukmani's younger daughter; Kaadhambari's sister; Shruthi's aunt (2017-2019)
- Sindhu Manu Varma as Raghavi – Raghavan and Guru's mother (2019–2020)
- Nathan Shyam as, (2018-2020)
  - Raghav - Raghavi's elder son; Guru's brother; Kaadhambari's obsessive ex-boyfriend, Shruthi's father (Dead)
  - Guru - Raghavi's younger son; Raghav's brother
- Janani Ashok Kumar as Ms. Mallika – Shruthi and Shakthi's governess (2017–2020)
- Raghavan as Guruji – An ayurvedic medical practitioner (2018–2020)
- Adhithiri Dinesh as Lavanya – Shakthi's best friend; Shruthi's enemy. (2017–2020)
- V. R. Thilagam as Chokkalingam – Nandini's father (2018)

== Sequel ==
In February 2021, Star Vijay announced the spiritual sequel of the series, titled Mouna Raagam 2, starring Raveena Daha, Rajeev Parameshwar, Chippy Renjith, Salmanul Faris, Rahul Ramachandran, Shilpa Nair and Divya Binu.
