= Vera Maari Trip =

Indian television series

- Genre: Workplace comedy
- Created by: RJ Shivakanth
- Written by: Sathya & Saravana
- Directed by: Jaswini J
- Starring: Jaiseelan; Raveena Daha; Vishwa Mithran; Sapna; VJ Pappu; Padine Kumar; Nizhalgal Ravi; Vikkals Vikram; Kureshi; Vanvi; Shiva Shah Ra; Vinoth; Nana Saravanan
- Music by: Saran Raghavan
- Country of origin: India
- Original language: Tamil
- No. of seasons: 1

Production
- Producer: RJ Shivakanth
- Cinematography: Satish
- Running time: 21–24 minutes per episode
- Production company: Kanaa Production

Original release
- Network: Aha Tamil
- Release: 9 January – 9 February 2025

Related
- Vera Maari Office; Vera Maari Love Story

Vera Maari Trip (transl. Different Trip) is a 2025 Indian Tamil-language workplace comedy sitcom streaming television series directed by RJ Shivakanth for Aha Tamil. The series created and written by RJ Shivakanth, and starring Jaiseelan, Raveena Daha, Vishwa Mithran, Sapna, VJ Pappu, Padine Kumar, Nizhalgal Ravi, Vikkals Vikram, Kureshi, Vanvi, Shiva Shah Ra, Vinoth and Nana Saravanan.

It was released on Aha Tamil on 9 January 2025, and is available for streaming on Aha Tamil in selected regions.

== Cast ==
- Jaiseelan as Krish
- Raveena Daha as Jenny
- Vishwa Mithran as Simbu
- Sapna as Thara
- VJ Pappu as Maari
- Padine Kumar as Paaru / Paarvathi
- Nizhalgal Ravi as Sridhar
- Vikkals Vikram as Kesavan
- Kureshi as Vilupuram Sugumaran
- Vanvi as Nithya (Krish’s ex-lover)
- Shiva Shah Ra as Kutti
- Vinoth as Vargheese
- Nana Saravanan as Chinnavandu
- Kemy as Kemy (Travel Influencer)

== Episodes ==
No. overall	No. in season	Title	Directed by	Written by	Original release date
1	1	"The Escape Plan"	RJ Shivakanth	Sathya Saravana, Saru Vana	9 January 2025
2	1	"Roadblocks and Revelations"	RJ Shivakanth	Sathya Saravana, Saru Vana	10 January 2025
3	1	"Stranded in Varkala"	RJ Shivakanth	Sathya Saravana, Saru Vana	11 January 2025
4	1	"Room for Trouble"	RJ Shivakanth	Sathya Saravana, Saru Vana	16 January 2025
5	1	"Thrills and Chills"	RJ Shivakanth	Sathya Saravana, Saru Vana	17 January 2025
6	1	"Waves of Changes"	RJ Shivakanth	Sathya Saravana, Saru Vana	18 January 2025
7	1	"Party Time"	RJ Shivakanth	Sathya Saravana, Saru Vana	23 January 2025
8	1	"The Surprise Call"	RJ Shivakanth	Sathya Saravana, Saru Vana	24 January 2025
9	1	"Spin the bottle"	RJ Shivakanth	Sathya Saravana, Saru Vana	25 January 2025
10	1	"The Unexpected Turn"	RJ Shivakanth	Sathya Saravana, Saru Vana	30 January 2025
11	1	"The Love Triangle"	RJ Shivakanth	Sathya Saravana, Saru Vana	31 January 2025
12	1	"Secrets and Revelations"	RJ Shivakanth	Sathya Saravana, Saru Vana	1 February 2025
13	1	"New Beginnings"	RJ Shivakanth	Sathya Saravana, Saru Vana	7 February 2025
14	1	"Unexpected Orders"	RJ Shivakanth	Sathya Saravana, Saru Vana	8 February 2025
15	1	"The Unveiling"	RJ Shivakanth	Sathya Saravana, Saru Vana	9 February 2025

== Production ==
=== Release ===
The first look poster was released on 31 December 2024 by actor Vishnu Vishal.
