= Vera Maari Office =

2023 Indian-Tamil language Workplace comedy sitcom streaming television series

- Promotional poster - Season 2
- Genre: Workplace comedy; Suspense; Sitcom
- Created by: RJ Shivakanth
- Written by: Sathya and Saravana
- Directed by: Chidambaram Manivannan (S1); Jaswini J (S2)
- Starring: RJ Vijay; Soundariya Nanjundan; Vishnu; Janani Ashok Kumar; Lavanya; VJ Paarvathy; Kannadhasan Shanmugam; VJ Pappu; Syama Harini; Vikkals Vikram
- Music by: Saran Raghavan
- Country of origin: India
- Original language: Tamil
- No. of seasons: 2

Production
- Producer: RJ Shivakanth
- Cinematography: Sathyaa
- Editors: Siddhartha Ravindranaath (S1); Vignesh Arjunan (S2)
- Running time: 22–37 minutes per episode
- Production company: Kanaa Production

Original release
- Network: Aha Tamil
- Release: 10 August 2023 – present

Related
- Vera Maari Love Story; Vera Maari Trip

Vera Maari Office (transl. Different Office) is a 2023 Indian Tamil-language workplace comedy sitcom streaming television series starring RJ Vijay, Soundariya Nanjundan, Janani Ashok Kumar, Vishnu (Season 1), Lavanya, VJ Pappu, Raveena Daha (Season 2), Sritharana (Season 2) and Jaiseelan (Season 2). The series created by RJ Shivakanth and written by Sathya and Saravana for Aha Tamil.

The first season aired from 10 August 2023 to 26 October 2023 and aried on every Thursday to Saturday at 7PM for 54 episodes. The second season aired from 15 August 2024 and consisted of 50 episodes.

== Series overview ==
Series	Episodes	Originally released		
Series	Episodes	First released	Last released	Network
1	54	10 August 2023	26 October 2023	Aha Tamil
2	50	15 August 2024	7 December 2024	Aha Tamil

== Cast ==
- RJ Vijay as Azhagesan aka Algates
- Soundariya Nanjundan as Leena
- Janani Ashok Kumar as Nisha
- Lavanya as Ramya
- Kannadhasan Shanmugam as Sathya
- Vishnu as Joe (Season 1)
- RJ Sarithiran as Poornachandran
- VJ Paarvathy as Sharmi
- VJ Pappu as Maari
- Syama Harini as Shyama
- Vikkals Vikram as Kesavan
- Sanjeev NC as Ram
- Jaiseelan as Krish (Season 2)
- Raveena Daha as Jenny (Season 2)
- Vishwa as Simbu (Season 2)
- Sapnaa as Thara (Season 2)

=== Special appearances ===
- Robo Shankar as BP (Season 1; Epi 36)

== Episodes ==
=== Season 1 ===
No.	Title	Directed by	Written by
1	"Fire...Fire.... Fired"	Chidambaram Manivannan	Sathya and Saravana
Ramya has an eventful day one at work as the fire alarm goes off, creating chaos and panic in the building of the Great Indian Company. A local inspector investigates each employee to find who caused the fire. Branch director Nisha receives a shocker from the CEO.
2	"Smoking Hot"	Chidambaram Manivannan	Sathya and Saravana
Ramya finds it difficult to make new friends with her co-workers. Pankaj is on a mission to find out who is smoking in the bathroom.
3	"The Challenge"	Chidambaram Manivannan	Sathya and Saravana
Nisha struggles to talk about the impending danger. Algatz meets Leena for the first time. Nisha's babysitter challenges her to care of her child Maaran for a day.
4	"Activities and Atrocities"	Chidambaram Manivannan	Sathya and Saravana
5	"Freshers for Sale"	Chidambaram Manivannan	Sathya and Saravana
6	"Caught in the Act"	Chidambaram Manivannan	Sathya and Saravana
7	"Tick Tick Tick"	Chidambaram Manivannan	Sathya and Saravana
8	"The One Night Stander"	Chidambaram Manivannan	Sathya and Saravana
9	"The Entanglement"	Chidambaram Manivannan	Sathya and Saravana
10	"It's Party Time"	Chidambaram Manivannan	Sathya and Saravana
Jo invites the juniors to his houseparty. The party is taken to the next level by an unknown guest.
11	"Wasted"	Chidambaram Manivannan	Sathya and Saravana
Things between Leena and Algatz escalate beyond control. Drunk Poornachandran shares his secrets.
12	"Girl Power"	Chidambaram Manivannan	Sathya and Saravana
Ram and Maari find Algatz' behaviour weird when they find him with his 'area' friends.
13	"The Misunderstanding"	Chidambaram Manivannan	Sathya and Saravana
A fight emerges between the queen's gang after someone leaks all their personal secrets. Poornachandran drops a surprising e-mail.
14	"Its Inspection Time"	Chidambaram Manivannan	Sathya and Saravana
15	"The Mischievous Jo"	Chidambaram Manivannan	Sathya and Saravana
16	"Love is Crazy"	Chidambaram Manivannan	Sathya and Saravana
Sharmi tries to make Sathya smile after a job rejection. When Poorna discovers Algatz often socialises with Leena, he becomes possessive of her.
17	"The Challenge"	Chidambaram Manivannan	Sathya and Saravana
With Jo’s assistance, Shyama tries the impossible task of going on a diet. Maari and Keshavan help Poorna enter the world of online dating.
18	"Komanam underwear"	Chidambaram Manivannan	Sathya and Saravana
Algatz and Leena were tasked with winning over a vendor with their design in order to secure a dealership for the business. Nisha struggles to choose which of her staff to lay off.
19	"Layoff begins"	Chidambaram Manivannan	Sathya and Saravana
20	"Confusions and Customers"	Chidambaram Manivannan	Sathya and Saravana
Sharmi and Ramya battle to persuade a customer to delete the unfavourable reviews. Dhana tries to sort out the delivery product mix-up.
21	"Mistaken Identity"	Chidambaram Manivannan	Sathya and Saravana
Sharmi takes advantage of Sathya mistaking her for the anonymous mailer, leading Ramya to become possessive. Lenna brings Algatz to his neighborhood for a client encounter when unforeseen events take place.
22	"The Surprise Visitor"	Chidambaram Manivannan	Sathya and Saravana
23	"Its Traditional Time"	Chidambaram Manivannan	Sathya and Saravana
24	"True Lies"	Chidambaram Manivannan	Sathya and Saravana
Jo and Sharmi are on a mission to make Sathya wear traditional clothes for the first time. Keshavan and Maari make up facts about their skills in order to get a job. However, it backfires when Poorna requests Maari and Keshavan to showcase their abilities. Sathya tells Ramya about his personal life.
25	"Crushed"	Chidambaram Manivannan	Sathya and Saravana
26	"The Strike"	Chidambaram Manivannan	Sathya and Saravana
Poorna delivers goods to the clients during the warehouse workers' strike. In his own peculiar way, Jo intervenes to prevent a co-worker from committing suicide.
27	"The Secret"	Chidambaram Manivannan	Sathya and Saravana
Keshavan and Maari battle it out for the possession of a chair. Nisha begins to have paranoid thoughts that the senior staff members have learned about the layoffs. Shyama and Sathya attempt to determine whether Ramya is the anonymous mailer.
28	"The Breaking Point"	Chidambaram Manivannan	Sathya and Saravana
Nisha tells Joe about her past for the first time. Poorna tells Algatz to stay away from Leena, which leads to Leena kissing Algatz. Poorna reveals the truth about downsizing to seniors while drunk.
29	"After Effect"	Chidambaram Manivannan	Sathya and Saravana
Following the shocking news the senior team is in a dilemma. Algatz makes an effort to discuss the party night with Leena.
30	"Customer Care"	Chidambaram Manivannan	Sathya and Saravana
31	"The Cold War"	Chidambaram Manivannan	Sathya and Saravana
32	"Secrets Revealed"	Chidambaram Manivannan	Sathya and Saravana
33	"The Backfire"	Chidambaram Manivannan	Sathya and Saravana
Maari invites a friend to his workplace to show off but Shyama has other plans. Sathya defends Ramya when Poorna condemns her.
34	"Finding The Truth"	Chidambaram Manivannan	Sathya and Saravana
Jo intends to question the laid-off Ram to learn the real reason for the downsizing. Maari extracts vengeance on Shyama for making him suffer at work.
35	"Reap What You Sow"	Chidambaram Manivannan	Sathya and Saravana
36	"The Consultant"	Chidambaram Manivannan	Sathya and Saravana
Unexpected news and an unexpected visitor arrive at the office. Ramya and Sathya open up to each other. Mari impersonates someone else to win Poorna's confidence.
37	"The Investigation"	Chidambaram Manivannan	Sathya and Saravana
Pathmanathan searches for information about each office worker. Algatz fails to demonstrate his dominance over Leena.
38	"The Ultimatum"	Chidambaram Manivannan	Sathya and Saravana
Pathmanathan gives an ultimatum to the employees in order for them to continue working. Warehouse employees visit Poorna to request a Diwali bonus.
39	"The Brainstorming"	Chidambaram Manivannan	Sathya and Saravana
Algatz struggles to come up with a presentation concept and ultimately decides to visit Leena at her home. Pathmanathan forbids Jo from talking to the female employees. Keshavan and Shyama struggle to create a marketing campaign idea.
40	"The Chaos"	Chidambaram Manivannan	Sathya and Saravana
Ramya's father invites Sathya to dinner, causing confusion. Algatz and Leena's relationship changes drastically.
41	"BP’s Atrocities"	Chidambaram Manivannan	Sathya and Saravana
BP issues a warning to the TGIC staff for failing to submit the marketing concept. Badhmanadhan apprehends Algatz and Leena. Jo is accused by BP and an investigation is launched.
42	"Open Up"	Chidambaram Manivannan	Sathya and Saravana
43	"The Viral Star"	Chidambaram Manivannan	Sathya and Saravana
44	"Couple Shopping"	Chidambaram Manivannan	Sathya and Saravana
Leena is impressed by Algatz's couple shopping concept. Poorna finds himself in a sticky situation with BP. Leena requests that Algatz visit his home right away.
45	"The Negative in Positive"	Chidambaram Manivannan	Sathya and Saravana
46	"Diwali Celebration"	Chidambaram Manivannan	Sathya and Saravana
Poorna is asked by BP to organise the office's Diwali party. Algatz's fear of becoming a father follows him everywhere. BP appears to have grand plans during the Diwali celebrations.
47	"The Open Up"	Chidambaram Manivannan	Sathya and Saravana
Leena and Algatz decide to manage the pregnancy together after being honest with one another. Ramya tells Sathya how much she loves her. The Diwali activity planned by Poocha turns out to be more fun than expected.
48	"The End Game"	Chidambaram Manivannan	Sathya and Saravana
The warehouse team comes to the office to request a Diwali bonus. BP announces the shocking news of downsizing the senior and fresher team in two months.
49	"The New Branch Director"	Chidambaram Manivannan	Sathya and Saravana
Everyone learns of Nisha's resignation. Poorna takes over as the new branch director and terrorises the employees.
50	"The Sudden Departure"	Chidambaram Manivannan	Sathya and Saravana
Poorna oppresses the staff. To everyone's surprise, Jo resigns from his job and leaves the office.
51	"The Prankster"	Chidambaram Manivannan	Sathya and Saravana
The warehouse workers are fired by Poorna. To learn the staff's opinions of him, Poorna pulls a prank on them.
52	"The Interview"	Chidambaram Manivannan	Sathya and Saravana
53	"The Game is On"	Chidambaram Manivannan	Sathya and Saravana
A surprise party is organised by Leena and her friends for Poorna. Algatz seeks assistance from his friend Naalu Jordan for his plan.
54	"Let’s Get Fired"	Chidambaram Manivannan	Sathya and Saravana
Poorna was demoted in accordance with everyone's plan. A surprise visitor enters the office and takes control of the situation.
55	"Vera Maari Office Blooper Special"	Chidambaram Manivannan	Sathya and Saravana

== Production ==
=== Development ===
Indian online OTT platform, Aha Tamil confirmed through a press release on 31 May 2023, that it would distribute new Tamil Web serial, to be created and produced by Shivakanth under the banner of Kanaa Production. The series is directed by Chidambaram Manivannan. The poster features an Office conference room, which has many employees and everyone is depicting their roles and showcasing various emotions.

In June 2024, Aha Tamil confirmed through a social media to announce that Vera Maari Office will be getting a second season.

=== Remake ===
The series was remade in telugu language titled Vere Level Office that released first episode on 12 December 2024.
