= Mouna Raagam 2 =

- Genre: Musical; Family drama
- Written by: Priya Thambi
- Directed by: Manoj Kumar (Episode 1–414); M.R Sarvana Kumar (Episode 415–517)
- Starring: Salmanul Faris; Raveena Daha; Rahul Ramachandran; Shilpa
- Theme music composer: Sananth George (Background Score)
- Composer: M. Jayachandran (Title Song)
- Country of origin: India
- Original language: Tamil
- No. of seasons: 2
- No. of episodes: 517

Production
- Producer: Chippy Renjith
- Production locations: Trivandrum, Kerala
- Cinematography: C. Jaya Kumar; Naveen; Gurumoorthi
- Editor: G.Pa Vinoth
- Camera setup: Multi-camera
- Running time: approx. 21–24 minutes per episode
- Production company: Avanthika Creations

Original release
- Network: Star Vijay; Disney+Hotstar
- Release: 1 February 2021 – 17 March 2023

Related
- Mouna Raagam

Mouna Raagam 2 (transl. Silent Symphony 2) is a 2021 Indian drama television series that premiered on Star Vijay and streams on Disney+ Hotstar. It was produced by Avanthika Creations, starring Salmanul Faris, Raveena Daha, Rahul Ramachandran and Shilpa in lead roles. It is the sequel to Mouna Raagam. It premiered on 1 February 2021 and ended on 17 March 2023 with 517 episodes.

== Synopsis ==
The narrative opens with Sakthi, now an adult, residing in a modest home in Thandikudi with her mother, Mallika. The second season introduces four new characters: Varun and Tharun (Manohar's sons), Manohar (a close associate of Karthik), and Sheela (Manohar's sister). Throughout the years, Karthik had continuously wondered where Mallika and Sakthi had gone.

Not long after, at an orchestra event, Sakthi runs into a now-grown Sruthi and Karthik, where she gets the chance to sing alongside her father. However, following Mallika's instructions, she keeps her true identity hidden. Meanwhile, Karthik is captivated by Sakthi's voice and finds himself reminiscing about the past. Later, Sakthi—under the alias Sathya—is invited to Karthik's home for his mother Parvathy's 75th birthday. Sruthi initially intends to perform a heartfelt song but fails, and Sakthi ends up delivering the performance instead. Parvathy, like Karthik, is moved yet unsure if this young woman could really be Sakthi.

Mallika and Sakthi soon move to Chennai for Mallika's medical treatment and Sakthi's new position at a music school. To their shock, they find that Karthik is the head of the school, alongside Manohar, Varun, and Tharun. It is here that Tharun first meets Sathya. Sruthi, still upset over Sakthi overshadowing her birthday performance, harbors a deep grudge. Tharun falls for Sathya, while Sruthi has feelings for Tharun. Sathya, uninterested in Tharun, rejects his proposal, to Sruthi's delight.

As the plot thickens, Karthik discovers Varun's fear of fire (Pyrophobia) and disapproves of Sruthi marrying him. Concurrently, Mallika's surgery commences, but Sakthi is crushed to learn that it requires nearly ₹5 lakh. She tries to raise funds by posting a video online. Though many contribute, only about 50–60% of the needed amount is raised. At this juncture, Manohar steps in, agreeing to cover the rest—on one condition: Sakthi must marry his son Varun. With no alternative, Sakthi consents and weds Varun. However, during a moment involving a candle, Varun's phobia resurfaces. At the same time, Karthik learns of the marriage, the deal Manohar struck, and Mallika's health.

After Mallika recovers, she is devastated to find that her daughter is married. In anguish, she disowns Sakthi and leaves. Fortunately, Tharun persuades her to forgive Sakthi, and they reconcile. Meanwhile, Sakthi uncovers Sheela's manipulative tendencies.

Karthik later invites Mallika and Sakthi to his birthday celebration. Parvathy becomes emotional upon seeing Mallika again. However, things take a dark turn when Mallika performs an aarti for Varun and Sakthi. Varun is overwhelmed by his phobia. Enraged, Mallika confronts Manohar. She later demands Sakthi return with her to Thandigudi. After deep thought, Sakthi chooses to remain with Manohar's family. Mallika leaves in a cab, but Sakthi, concerned for her safety, informs Karthik, who catches up with her and offers a ride. He visits Thandigudi and enjoys his time there.

Meanwhile, Sakthi and Varun grow closer. However, Sheela, furious at their growing bond, tampers with Varun's medication, which deteriorates his reflexes, and spreads lies that turn Varun against Sakthi. To prove her love, Sakthi vows to sing non-stop for 12 hours. Sheela secretly spikes her drink with a cocktail that affects her vocal cords. Determined, Sakthi makes herself a Badam shake, restoring her voice, and successfully completes the challenge, winning the competition. Mallika is overjoyed, and Varun reconciles with Sakthi.

Despite this, Sruthi's feelings for Tharun linger. In a bid to help, Karthik approaches Manohar but is insulted. Desperate, Sruthi emotionally manipulates Sakthi, who then convinces the family to approve the marriage. Manohar agrees, but Karthik is banned from attending. Sakthi secretly shares the ceremony over a video call.

Varun arranges a surprise inauguration at the music school, where Sakthi's growing popularity sparks Sruthi's jealousy and suspicion about her identity. After a heartfelt performance by both, Tharun unexpectedly hands control of the school to Sruthi, later revealed to be the result of her blackmail—threatening to expose his past feelings for Sakthi. Bending the truth, Sruthi states that Sakthi and Tharun consented to be life partners, though Sakthi had indeed spurned him. The deception makes everyone turn against her. Discouraged, Sakthi makes up her mind to depart and holds Karthik responsible for her agony. During her journey to Thandigudi, she's abducted but manages to escape. Filled with remorse, Varun searches for her and pleads for forgiveness, but she won't come back. Before departing, she surprises Manohar's family by announcing her real name—Sakthi—and her actual parentage.

Kadambari and Rukmani attempt to kill Mallika but flee when Sakthi threatens them. Karthik sends a legal notice to Manohar, and Sheela retaliates with divorce papers for Sakthi. Varun travels to Kutralam, meets Pazhani, uncovers Sakthi's past, and brings Swarna and Pazhani to Thandigudi. They meet Mallika and get to know about Sakthi's husband and the divorce papers that they sent. Manohar and Sheela tried to convince Malliga and Pazhani. At a confrontation, Sheela mocks Sakthi's talent, prompting Pazhani to challenge Varun to sing like her. If he succeeds, Sakthi will return. Karthik helps Varun complete the challenge. Meanwhile, an assassin stabs Karthik instead of Sakthi after the Sakthi-Varun concert.

News spreads like wildfire. Kadambari and Sruthi try to take Karthik back to Chennai but are stopped. Karthik returns eventually. Sakthi has Kadambari and Rukmani arrested, but Viswanathan bails them out. Furious, Kadambari learns Mallika is living with Karthik and seeks revenge. Viswanathan sets a fire to trigger Varun, but Sakthi intervenes.

Sheela is evicted after her true colors are revealed and sides with Kadambari. Sruthi fakes a pregnancy but plans to blame Sakthi for her miscarriage. Tharun scolds her. Sakthi investigates and reveals the truth, enraging Tharun.

As Karthik's birthday nears, Kadambari plans to organize it but is furious to hear that Mallika and Karthik will sing together at the occasion. Her father kidnaps Mallika but Sornam makes ends meet by manipulating Sheela into revealing her location. The couple performs, much to the villains’ dismay.

Later, Manohar discov`ers that his wife Kasturi is alive—Sheela had kept her captive. The family believed she died in a fire. Manohar and Tharun nurse her back to health. At another ceremony, Varun panics due to fire again. Sakthi collects evidence and identifies the culprit. To cure Varun, Swarna proposes recreating the fire—involving Sakthi instead of Kasturi. Despite protests from everyone, she goes through with it and helps Varun overcome his fear. At the same time, Mallika and Karthik release a viral new song, frustrating Kadambari.

Swarna introduces Shalini (her niece). Meanwhile, Manohar and family wonder about Kasturi's past. Sakthi overhears Sruthi's conversation, leading to her arrest. Rukmani and Kadambari return to harm Mallika but are thwarted.

Varun and Tharun plan a surprise celebration for Karthik and Mallika. Sruthi becomes jealous of Shalini's bond with Tharun. Kadambari and Rukmani decide to learn music to get closer to Karthik and prepare for an upcoming concert featuring him and her.

Rukmani creates a harmful solution to destroy Mallika's voice and tricks Swarna into delivering it. Swarna, suspecting foul play, gives it to Kadambari instead.

Manohar plans a temple visit with Kasturi. Meanwhile, Sruthi becomes furious when Kasturi places family heirlooms in Sakthi's care. Rukmani hires a goon to steal the items, shaming Sakthi in front of everybody. Varun, confident in Sakthi's innocence, vows to recover them and exposes Sruthi. Tharun asks Sruthi to leave the house.

Swarna advises Tharun to separate from Sruthi. Kadambari and Karthik argue over Sruthi. Sruthi provokes Swarna into revealing the DNA report showing she is not Karthik's daughter. Heartbroken, Sruthi vanishes. Sakthi and Varun find her, and she reconciles with Sakthi.

When Kadambari learns Mallika knew the truth all along, she apologizes before leaving the house. Karthik convinces both women to stay. The family confronts the issue of Sruthi and Tharun's divorce, which is resolved.

The 7-year-long soap concludes with a joyful family reunion, bringing everyone together in harmony.

== Cast ==
=== Main ===
- Raveena Daha as Shakthi (Sathya) – Karthik and Mallika's daughter; Varun's wife (2021–2023)
- Shilpa as Shruthi – Karthik (Raghav) and Kadhambari's daughter; Tharun's wife (2021–2023)
- Salmanul Faris as Varun Manoharan – Manohar and Kasthuri's Elder Son; A Manager of Manohar's businesses; Sakthi's husband (2021–2023)
- Rahul Ramachandran as Tharun Manoharan – Manoharan and Kasthuri's younger son; Varun's brother; Shruthi's husband. (2021–2023)
- Rajeev Parameshwar as Karthik Krishna – Playback singer; Parvati's younger son; Murali's brother; Mallika and Kadhambari's husband; Shakthi's father and Shruthi's step-father. (2021–2023)
- Chippy Ranjith as Mallika- Natural singer, Palani's sister. Karthik's first wife and Shakthi's mother (2021–2023)
- Anusree Chembakassery as Kaadhambari- Vishwanathan and Rukmani's elder daughter. Karthik's second wife and Shruthi's mother (2021–2023)

=== Recurring ===
- A. Revathy as Parvathi Krishna – Murali's and Karthik's mother; Sakthi's grandmother; Shruti's step-grandmother. (2021–2023)
- Uday Mahesh (2021) / Krishna Kumar Menon (2021–2023) as Manoharan – Karthik's close associate; Sheela's brother; Kasthuri's husband; Varun and Tharun's father.
- Divya Binu as Sheela – Manoharan's sister; Varun and Tharun's aunt; Kasthuri's sister-in-law. (2021–2023)
- Manjula (photographic appearance)/Remya Sudha as Kasthuri Manoharan – Manoharan's wife; Varun and Tharun's mother. (2022–2023)
- Anjali Devi as Rukmani Vishwanathan – Vishwanathan's wife; Kadhambari's mother; Shruthi's grandmother. (2021–2023)
- Kailas Nath as Sukumar – Sakthi's Uncle. (2021–2022)
- Supergood Kannan as Pazhaniswamy A.K.A Pazhani – Mallika's brother; Swarna's husband; Shankar and Chandra's father; Shakthi's uncle. (2022–2023)
- Seema G. Nair as Swarna Pazhaniswamy – Pazhani's wife; Shankar and Chandra's mother; Sakthi's aunt. (2022–2023)
- Anand Babu as Vishwanathan – Rukmani's husband; Kadhambari's father; Shruthi's grandfather (2022–2023)
- Reshma Nandhu as Shalini (2023)

== Production ==
=== Release ===
The first promo was unveiled on 11 January 2021, featuring the cast, the second promo was unveiled on 28 January 2021, by revealing the release date.
