= Rajeev Parameshwar =

Indian Television actor

Rajeev Parameshwaran
- Born: Thrissur, Kerala, India
- Occupations: Actor; Model
- Years active: 2000–present
- Spouse: Deepa
- Children: 2

Rajeev Parameshwaran is an Indian actor and former model who has done several films, music albums and television serials in Malayalam. He has done over 30 serials and 10 films in his career spanning around two decades. His notable works include Prakash in Ente Manasaputhri, Sooraj in Kavyanjali, Mahi in Vanambadi, Balakrishnan Pillai in Santhwanam and Karthik Krishna in Mouna Raagam (Tamil). He is also noted for his role as Dasan Maash in the 2010 Malayalam film Paappi Appacha.

== Biography ==
Rajeev was born to Parameshwaran and Sathi Devi. He is married to Deepa and has two children, Sivanya and Atharv. He started his career as a model and has done print and commercial advertisements with R. Madhavan, Lenaa and Vidya Balan. Rajeev made his acting debut in the Malayalam film Swayamvara Panthal. He became a familiar face through East Coast music albums, the same year he acted in Malayalam serial Preyasi alongside Kaviyoor Ponnamma and later playing the lead roles in serials like Oomakkuyil, Venalmazha, Kavyanjali and Omanathingal Pakshi established himself as a lead actor in Malayalam Television. He has appeared in films such as Nidra, Paappi Appacha and The Metro.

== Television ==
Partial list of Television Serials

- All TV series are in Malayalam, unless otherwise noted.

Year	Title	Role	Channel	Notes
2000	Preyasi		Surya TV	
2001	Marubhoomiyile Pookkalam		DD Malayalam	
2001-2002	Venalmazha		Surya TV	
	Sandhyalekshmi	Ajay		
2003	Oomakkuyil		Surya TV	
2005-2006	Omanathinkal Pakshi	Jimmy	Asianet	
2004-2006	Kavyanjali	Sooraj	Surya TV	
2005	Mounam		Surya TV	
2006	Thadankal Palayam		Asianet	
2007	Punarjanmam	Prakash	Surya TV	
2007-2008	Pookalam		Surya TV	
2007-2010	Ente Manasaputhri	Prakash	Asianet	
2008	Kudumbayogam		Surya TV	
2009	Thulabharam		Surya TV	
2011-2012	Autograph	CK	Asianet	
2013	Ardram	Mohan	Asianet	
2013-2014	Penmanassu	Sibichan	Surya TV	
2013-2014	Indira		Mazhavil Manorama	
2014-2015	Ente Pennu	Radheyan	Mazhavil Manorama	
2014-2015	Snehajalakam	Harisankar	Surya TV	
2016	Chechiyamma	Jeevan	Surya TV	
2016	Sundari	Roshan	Mazhavil Manorama	
2016-2017	Ottachilambu	Ravindra Varma	Mazhavil Manorama	
2017-2020	Mouna Raagam	Karthik Krishna	Star Vijay	Tamil TV series
2018-2019	Vanambadi	Mahi	Asianet	
2020 – 2024	Santhwanam	Balakrishnan	Asianet	
2021–2023	Mouna Raagam 2	Karthik Krishna	Star Vijay	Tamil TV series
2023 – present	Sandhya Raagam	Raghuram	Zee Tamil	Tamil TV series
2024	Kadhanayika	Himself	Mazhavil Manorama	Guest appearance
2024	Santhwanam 2	Balakrishnan	Asianet	Promo only
2026	Heart Beat 3	Vinayak	JioHotstar	Webseries
2026	Kunjumaalakha	John C. Eesho	Mazhavil Manorama	

Reality Shows as Contestant

- Munch stars (2013) - Asianet
- Star Wars (2018) - Surya TV

Telefilm

- Kaanappurangal

Music Albums

- Ninakayi
- Mithadhu Madeedu Jadeedu

== Filmography ==
Year	Title	Role	Notes
2000	Swayamvara Panthal	Priya's brother	Debut
2005	The Campus	Najeeb	Second lead
2009	Rahasya Police	Sasi	
2010	Paappi Appacha	Sivadasa Kaimal (Dasan maash)	Breakthrough
2011	The Metro	Jaimy Padamadan	
2012	Simahasanam	Lokan	
2012	Nidra	Rajeev	
2012	Pudhumugangal Thevai		Tamil film
2013	Ayaal	Chandran	
2013	Proprietors: Kammath & Kammath	Mahalekshmi's groom	
2014	Mr. Fraud	Prathapa Varma	
TBA	Kasu Panam Thuttu		Tamil film
