= Jodi Are U Ready season 2 =

Jodi Are U Ready
- Season 2
- Hosted by: Rio Raj; Angelin
- Judges: Sandy Master; Rambha; Sridevi Vijaykumar
- No. of contestants: 12
- Winners: Abhinav & Rani Kumari
- No. of episodes: 29

Release
- Original network: Star Vijay
- Original release: 25 January – 4 May 2025

Season chronology
- ← Previous; Season 1 Next → Season 3

Jodi Are U Ready season 2 is the second season of the Indian Tamil-language dance reality show Jodi Are U Ready. It is aired on Star Vijay every Saturday and Sunday at 21:30 and premiered on 25 January 2025 and ended on 4 May 2025 with 29 episodes, which then was replaced by Cooku with Comali season 6 show. It is also available for streaming on Disney+ Hotstar.

The show is a competition wherein 12 talented male dancers with television and film celebrity are paired up couples compete against each other. Rio Raj and Angelina return to host. Actress Sridevi Vijaykumar and Choreographer Sandy Master will be joined by new judge Rambha.

The show was won by Abhinav and Rani Kumari, while Gowri shankar and Ananya emerged as the runner up of the show. Gurunath and Arunima won third place.

== Contestants ==
| # | Jodi | | Week entered | Week exited | Status | Zone | Encounter faced |
| # | Contestants | Celebrities | Week entered | Week exited | Status | Zone | Encounter faced |
|---|---|---|---|---|---|---|---|
| 1 | Abhinav | Rani Kumari | Week 2 | Week 15 | Winner | - | 2 |
| 2 | Gowri shankar | Ananya | Week 2 | Week 15 | 1st Runner-Up | - | 1 |
| 3 | Gurunath | Arunima | Week 2 | Week 15 | 1st Runner-Up | - | 1 |
| 4 | Avinash Ashok | Deeshal | Week 2 | Week 15 | 3rd Runner-Up | - | |
| 5 | Vijay | Shreya | Week 2 | Week 15 | 4th Runner-Up | - | - |
| 6 | Aravind | Riya Ruth | Week 2 | Week 14 | Evicted | Diamond Zone | 1 |
| 7 | Pradeep | Priyanka | Week 3 | Week 14 | Evicted | Diamond Zone | - |
| 8 | Manikanda | Harshita | Week 6 | Week 12 | Evicted | Diamond Zone | 1 |
| 9 | Sanjay | Athira | Week 2 | Week 9 | Evicted | Gold Zone | 2 |
| 10 | B-Trixx | Akshitha | Week 2 | Week 9 | Evicted | Gold Zone | 2 |
| 11 | Bhaskar | Kavya | Week 2 | Week 5 | Evicted | Silver Zone | 2 |
| 12 | Sandy Sundar | Anshitha | Week 2 | Week 4 | Evicted | Silver Zone | 1 |
| 13 | - | Jasmeen | Week 2 | Week 4 | Disqualified | Silver Zone | 0 |

== Top Jodi Of The Week ==
| Week | Jodi | Round | |
|---|---|---|---|
| 3 | Jodi | Abhinav & Rani Kumari | First Jodi Round |
| 4 | Gurunath & Arunima | Trending Hook Step Round | |
| 6 | Avinash Ashok & Deeshal | Super Hit 90's Round | |
| 7 | Gurunath & Arunima | Duet Free Style Round | |
| 8 | Avinash Ashok & Deeshal | Naatu Kuthu Round | |
| 9 | Gowri Shankar & Ananya Rao | Creative Property Round | |
| 10 | Gowri Shankar & Ananya Rao | Mathiyosi Round | |
| 12 | Abhinav & Rani Kumari | Keep In Touch Round | |
| 13 | Avinash Ashok & Deeshal | Ticket to Finale (first finalist) | |
| 14 | Gowri Shankar & Ananya Rao | Semi Finale Round | |

== Episodes ==
| Week | Episodes | Airing | Round | Notes |
|---|---|---|---|---|
| Week 1 | 1 | 25 January 2025 | Grand Launch | |
| Week 1 | 2 | 26 January 2025 | Grand Launch | |
| Week 2 | 3 | 1 February 2025 | Jodi Selection Round | |
| Week 2 | 4 | 2 February 2025 | Jodi Selection Round | |
| Week 3 | 5 | 8 February 2025 | Dance Master Audition Round | |
| Week 3 | 6 | 9 February 2025 | Dance Master Audition Round | |
| Week 4 | 7 | 15 February 2025 | First Jodi Round | |
| Week 4 | 8 | 16 February 2025 | First Jodi Round | |
| Week 5 | 9 | 22 February 2025 | Trending Hook Step Round | |
| Week 5 | 10 | 23 February 2025 | Trending Hook Step Round | |
| Week 6 | 11 | 1 March 2025 | Super Hit 90's Round | |
| Week 6 | 12 | 2 March 2025 | Super Hit 90's Round | |
| Week 7 | 13 | 8 March 2025 | Duet Free Style Round | |
| Week 7 | 14 | 9 March 2025 | Duet Free Style Round | |
| Week 8 | 15 | 15 March 2025 | Naatu Kuthu Round | |
| Week 8 | 16 | 16 March 2025 | Naatu Kuthu Round | |
| Week 9 | 17 | 22 March 2025 | Creative Property Round | |
| Week 9 | 18 | 23 March 2025 | Creative Property Round | |
| Week 10 | 19 | 29 March 2025 | Mathiyosi Round | |
| Week 10 | 20 | 30 March 2025 | Mathiyosi Round | |
| Week 11 | 21 | 5 April 2025 | Wildcard Round | Actress Sukanya as special guest |
| Week 11 | 22 | 6 April 2025 | Wildcard Round | Actress Sukanya as special guest |
| Week 12 | 23 | 12 April 2025 | Keep in Touch Round | |
| Week 12 | 24 | 13 April 2025 | Keep in Touch Round | |
| Week 13 | 25 | 19 April 2025 | Ticket to Finale | |
| Week 13 | 26 | 20 April 2025 | Ticket to Finale | |
| Week 14 | 27 | 26 April 2025 | Semi Finals | |
| Week 14 | 28 | 27 April 2025 | Semi Finals | |
| Week 15 | 29 | 4 May 2025 | Grand Final | |

== Production ==
=== Development ===
After the Bigg Boss show ended, Jodi Are U Ready season 2 began on 25 January 2025 as scheduled. On 3 January 2025, a promo was released on Star Vijay's social media platforms.

The show format largely went unchanged, though there were changes in the judging panel; Sridevi Vijaykumar and Sandy Master returned, but Meena left and was succeeded by Rambha.

=== Release ===
The first promo was unveiled on 3 January 2025, featuring Judges (Sandy Master, Sridevi Vijaykumar) Introduction.
