= Dance Jodi Dance season 2 =

Dance Jodi Dance
- Season 2
- Hosted by: Deepak Dinkar
- Judges: Sneha; Gautami; Priyamani
- Winners: Ruth and Rinish Raj

Release
- Original network: Star Vijay
- Original release: 2 December 2017 – 27 May 2018

Season chronology
- ← Previous; Season 1 Next → Season 3

Dance Jodi Dance (season 2) or Dance Jodi Dance 2.0 (Tamil: டான்ஸ் ஜோடி டான்ஸ் 2) is a 2017-2018 Tamil-language dance competition reality television show, that aired on Zee Tamil from 2 December 2017 to 26 May 2018. It is a second season of the show Dance Jodi Dance. Actress Sneha, Gautami and Priyamani are the judges of this show and hosted by Deepak Dinkar. The season title winner is Ruth and Rinish Raj.

== Judges ==
- Sneha
- Gautami
- Priyamani

== Winners ==
The Grand finale event was held in Chennai at EVP Film City and telecast live on 26 May at 19:30 (IST). The grand finale of the show Hosted by Deepak Dinkar and Archana Chandoke.

Top five finalists

Finalists	Winners	Amount won
Ruth & Rinish Raj	Title winners	₹5,00,000
Krishnamoorthy & Raveena Daha	Second runner-up	₹3,30,000
Deva & Deeshika	Third runner-up	₹2,25,000
Kaali & Meghna Vincent		
Avinash & Meghna		

== Contestants ==
A total of twelve celebrities, mostly TV actors, are paired with dancers handpicked through auditions and will go head to head in their quest to be best performers.

#	Contestants	Celebrity partner
1	Pavithra	Puvi Arasu
2	Kaali	Meghna Vincent
3	Jerome	Reshma Muralidharan
4	Keerthana	Shyam
5	Avinash	Meghna
6	Ruth	Renish
7	Krishnamoorthy	Raveena Daha
8	(HipHop) Karthik	Abhinaya Shree
9	Deva	Ramya; Deeshika (replaced Ramya)
10	Jessie	Vinoth Kishan
11	Karthik	Lassiya
12	Renisha	Karthick Ashokan

== Auditions ==
The auditions about the show has begun in Coimbatore on 23 September, followed by auditions in Madurai and Trichy.Chennai's audition is all set to take place tomorrow and all the shortlisted participants from all these places will participate in the mega audition that will be held on 29 October.

- Coimbatore
- Madurai
- Trichy
- Chennai

== Awards and nominations ==
Year	Award	Category	Recipient	Result
2018	Galatta Nakshathra Awards	Best Weekend Entertainer Show	Dance Jodi Dance 2	Nominated
