= Vere Level Office =

2024 Indian-Telugu language workplace comedy sitcom streaming television series

- Promotional release poster
- Genre: Workplace comedy; Suspense; Sitcom
- Starring: Mirchi Kiran; RJ Kajal
- Music by: Ajay Arasada
- Country of origin: India
- Original language: Telugu
- No. of seasons: 2
- No. of episodes: 42

Production
- Producer: Varun Chowdary Gogineni
- Cinematography: Chintapally Pradeep Reddy
- Editor: Subbu Polisetty

Original release
- Network: Aha
- Release: 12 December 2024 – present

Related
- Vera Maari Office

Vere Level Office (transl. Different Office) is an Indian Telugu-language workplace comedy sitcom streaming television series directed by E. Satti Babu starring Mirchi Kiran and RJ Kajal. The series first aired on Aha on 12 December 2024 and is a remake of the Tamil series Vera Maari Office.

== Cast ==
- Mirchi Kiran as HR Subhramanya Sastry
- RJ Kajal as Nisha
- Vasanthika
- Subhasree Biswas
- Swathi Chowdary
- Ravi Shiva Teja
- Mahesh Vitta
- Ramana Bhargava
- Akhil Vivaan
- P. Mahendar
- Raja Vikram
- Akhil Sarthak

== Reception ==
A critic from The Hans India wrote, "Vere Level Office is a delightful watch for those looking for a lighthearted series filled with humor and relatable office drama. With its engaging characters and promising storyline, it strikes a chord with both youth and corporate audiences". Regarding episodes 1-3, a critic from OTTplay wrote, "The series and its characters take time to grow on you, but once they do, they begin to make sense. It’s too early to judge the show fully, as more episodes are set to release regularly". Regarding episode 4, a critic from The Hans India wrote, "Overall, Episode 4 feels like a feel-good, well-rounded entry in the series. It’s funny, engaging, and even a little thought-provoking".
