= 3:33 (film) =

2021 Indian film

- Theatrical release poster
- Directed by: Nambikkai Chandru
- Written by: Nambikkai Chandru
- Produced by: T. Jeevitha Kishore
- Starring: Sandy; Gautham Vasudev Menon; Shruthi Selvam
- Cinematography: Sathish Manoharan
- Edited by: Deepak S Dwaraknath
- Music by: Harshavardhan Rameshwar
- Production company: Bamboo Trees Productions
- Release date: 10 December 2021
- Country: India
- Language: Tamil

3:33 is a 2021 Indian Tamil-language psychological horror film written and directed by debutant Nambikkai Chandru and produced by Bamboo Trees Productions. The film stars Sandy, Gautham Vasudev Menon and Shruthi Selvam with a supporting cast including Saravanan, Reshma Pasupuleti, Rama and Mime Gopi. The film was released theatrically on 10 December 2021.

== Cast ==
- Sandy as Kathir
- Gautham Vasudev Menon as Paranormal investigator
- Shruthi Selvam
- Saravanan as Kathir's father
- Rama as Kathir's mother
- Mime Gopi as Exorcist
- Reshma Pasupuleti as Devi
- Madhankumar Dhakshinamoorthy
- Uriyadi Chandru
- Pradeep Muthu
- Baby J. K. Lisha
- Suba
- Uma Shankar

== Release ==
The film released in theatres on 10 December 2021.

== Reception ==
Suganth of The Times of India gave a rating of 2.5 out on 5 and wrote, "The film then throws stuff like semi-evil numbers, mediums who communicate with ghosts and more scenes with Kathir that may or may not be bad dreams, but by then, the film stops being truly scary and turns exhausting." Avinash Ramachandran from CinemaExpress gave it 3 stars from 5 and worte "Sandy makes a confident start with this decent thriller.”
