= Dance Jodi Dance Reloaded season 3 =

Dance Jodi Dance Reloaded
- Season 3
- Hosted by: RJ Vijay; Manimegalai
- Judges: Sneha; Baba Bhaskar; Varalaxmi Sarathkumar
- Winners: Nithin & Ditya Bhande
- No. of episodes: 40

Release
- Original network: Zee Tamil
- Original release: 1 March – 20 July 2025

Season chronology
- ← Previous; Season 2 Next → Season 4

Dance Jodi Dance Reloaded season 3 is the third season of the Indian Tamil-language dance reality television series Dance Jodi Dance Reloaded. It was premiered on March 1, 2025 on Zee Tamil and aired on Saturday and Sunday at 20:30, and streams on ZEE5. RJ Vijay returned to host, accompanied by the new Manimegalai. Sneha and Baba Bhaskar will be joined by new judge Varalaxmi Sarathkumar.

The grand finale consisted of two rounds. The final episode was aired 3 hours on 20 July, and ended with 40 Episodes. Actor and music director Vijay Antony and RR Tamilselvan was as special guests. The show was won by Nithin and Ditya Bhande while Thillai and Preeta emerged as the runner up of the show.

== Production ==
Season 3 began on 1 March 2025 as scheduled. On 14 February 2025, a promo was released on Zee Tamil's social media platforms. The show is a competition where the top 12 contestants will be paired with television celebrity are paired up couples compete against each other.

== Contestants ==
| # | Contestants | Celebrity partner | Date of Elimination | Status |
|---|---|---|---|---|
| 1 | Nithin | Ditya Bhande | Week 26 | Winner |
| 2 | Thillai | Maanya Anand(Week 2-6)/ Preetha (Week 7-21) | Week 26 | 1st Runner-Up |
| 3 | Prajna | Gagana | Week 26 | 2nd Runner-Up |
| 4 | Janushiika | Sabharish | Week 26 | Finalist |
| 5 | Dileep | Mersina | Week 26 | Finalist |
| 6 | Panchami | Kathir | Week 22 | Evicted |
| 7 | Prakash | Raveena Daha | Week 20 | Evicted |
| 8 | Mohan | Sriya | Week 17 | walked |
| 9 | Aditi | Sugesh (2nd Week) / Maanas (Week 3 - Week 14) | Week 14 | Eliminated |
| 10 | Arun | Kemy | Week 10 | Eliminated |
| 11 | Alwin | Parveen | Week 6 | Eliminated |
| 12 | Krithika | Deepak | Week 4 | Walked |

== Episodes ==
| Week | Episodes | Airing | Round | Notes |
|---|---|---|---|---|
| 1 | 1 | 1 March 2025 | Mega Audition | |
| 1 | 2 | 2 March 2025 | Mega Audition | |
| 2 | 3 | 8 March 2025 | Intro Round | |
| 2 | 4 | 8 March 2025 | Intro Round | |
| 3 | 5 | 15 March 2025 | Song Recreation Round | |
| 3 | 6 | 16 March 2025 | Song Recreation Round | |
| 4 | 7 | 22 March 2025 | Endrendrum 80's | RJ Vijay Not participating as host |
| 4 | 8 | 23 March 2025 | Endrendrum 80's | RJ Vijay Not participating as host |
| 5 | 9 | 29 March 2025 | Dancing with Stars Round | |
| 5 | 10 | 30 March 2025 | Dancing with Stars Round | |
| 6 | 11 | 5 April 2025 | Devotional Round | Elimination Round |
| 6 | 12 | 6 April 2025 | Devotional Round | Elimination Round |
| 7 | 13 | 12 April 2025 | Vera Mari Round | |
| 7 | 14 | 13 April 2025 | Vera Mari Round | |
| 8 | 15 | 19 April 2025 | Maha Sangamam | |
| 8 | 16 | 20 April 2025 | Maha Sangamam | |
| 9 | 17 | 26 April 2025 | Tent Kota Round | |
| 9 | 18 | 27 April 2025 | Tent Kota Round | |
| 10 | 19 | 3 May 2025 | Mass Hero Round | RJ Vijay Not participating as host |
| 10 | 20 | 4 May 2025 | Mass Hero Round | RJ Vijay Not participating as host |
| 11 | - | - | Mass Hero Round | Saturday episode Not telecast because of Sa Re Ga Ma Pa Tamil Li'l Champs 4 Grand Final |
| 11 | 21 | 11 May 2025 | Mass Hero Round | |
| 12 | 22 | 18 May 2025 | Dedication Round | |
| 12 | 23 | 17 May 2025 | Dedication Round | |
| 13 | 24 | 24 May 2025 | Manvasanai Round | |
| 13 | 25 | 25 May 2025 | Manvasanai Round | |
| 14 | 26 | 31 May 2025 | Kadavul Pathi Mirukam Pathi | Remya Nambeesan as special judge |
| 14 | 27 | 1 June 2025 | Kadavul Pathi Mirukam Pathi | Remya Nambeesan as special judge |
| 15 | 28 | 7 June 2025 | Thara Local Round | Namitha as special judge |
| 15 | 29 | 8 June 2025 | Thara Local Round | Namitha as special judge |
| 16 | 30 | 14 June 2025 | One on One Round | |
| 16 | 31 | 15 June 2025 | One on One Round | |
| 17 | 3233 | 21 June 2025 | Role Reverse round | Namitha and Remya Nambeesan as special judges |
| 17 | 33 | 22 June 2025 | Role Reverse round | Namitha and Remya Nambeesan as special judges |
| 18 | 34 | 28 June 2025 | Single Property Round | Namitha and Remya Nambeesan as special judges |
| 18 | 35 | 29 June 2025 | Single Property Round | Namitha and Remya Nambeesan as special judges |
| 19 | 36 | 5 July 2025 | Semi Finale Round 1 | |
| 19 | 37 | 6 July 2025 | Semi Finale Round 1 | |
| 20 | 38 | 12 July 2025 | Celebration Round | |
| 20 | 39 | 13 July 2025 | Celebration Round | |
| 21 | 40 | 20 July 2025 | Grand Finale | |

== Guest ==
| Date | Episode No | Guest Name | Reference |
|---|---|---|---|
| 8 March 2025 | 3 | Arivu | |
| 9 March 2025 | 4 | Deepa Shankar, Amir | |
| 22 March 2025 | 7 | Anand Babu | |
| 23 March 2025 | 8 | R. Sarathkumar & Radhika Sarathkumar only in Video | |
| 29 March 2025 | 9 & 10 | Priyanka Nalkari | |
| 19 April 2025 | 15 | R. Sarathkumar & Nicholai Sachdev | |
| 3 May 2025 | 19 & 20 | Santhanam | |
| 17 May 2025 | 22 & 23 | Soori | |
| 24 May 2025 | 24 & 25 | Shanmuga Pandian | |
| 14 June 2025 | 30 & 31 | Vaibhav & Athulya Ravi | |
