= Kings of Dance season 2 =

Television series

Kings of Dance
- Season 2
- No. of episodes: 41

Release
- Original network: Vijay TV
- Original release: 7 October 2017 – 4 March 2018

Kings of Dance (season 2) (Tamil: கிங்ஸ் ஆப் டான்ஸ் சீசன் 2) is a 2017-2018 Tamil language reality Dance show which aired on Star Vijay on every Saturday and Sunday at 21:30 (IST) starting from 7 October 2017. Tamil Film Dancer choreographers Raju Sundaram, Sheriff, Sandy and Jeffrey are the judges of this season. The show ended with 41 Episodes from 4 March 2018.

== Overview ==
The show is a dance competition for contestants of any age as individuals or in a team.

== Creative Team ==
- Rahul Vijay
- Manivannan
- Sithara
- Prabhu
- Sugenthiran
- Grace Veronica
- Deepak
- Laxman

== Audition ==
- Thoothukudi
- Madurai
- Coimbatore
- Chennai

== Finalist ==
- Velammal Kids from Team Jeffery
- Ashwin Scott from Team Jeffery
- Yobu and Mercyna from Team Jeffery
- ADS kids from Team Sherif
- Laab crew from Team Sherif
- Bipin princy from Team Jeffery
- O2 from Team Sandy
- Vignesh from Team Sherif

== Winners ==
- Title Winner : LAAB Crew From Team Sherif
- 1st Runner-up : ADS kids From Team Sherif
- 2nd Runner-up : Bipin and Princy From Team Jeffery
- 3rd Runner-up : Ashwin Scott From Team Jeffery
- Consolation Prize : o2 From Sandy Team

== Judges ==
- Raju Sundaram: is a National Award-winning Indian choreographer and actor who has primarily worked on Tamil and Telugu language films. A few Films-Jeans (1998), Quick Gun Murugan (2009).
- Sheriff: a Tamil cinema choreographer, who recently choreographed for the blockbuster actor Vijay's Theri. He was the title winner in dance reality show like a Ungalil yar adutha Prabhudeva.
- Sandy or Santhosh Kumar debut season of Maanada Mayilada Dance show choreographed movie poda podi, gethu etc.
- Jeffrey #hotshoe# dance club owner, south India professional certified salsa dancer
