= Raveena Daha =

Indian television and film actress

- Born: Raveena Jeyarajan; 10 October 2003 (age 22); Chennai, India
- Occupations: Actress; Dancer
- Years active: 2014–present
- Known for: Mouna Raagam 2 Cooku with Comali (season 4); Bigg Boss Tamil 7 Jodi Are U Ready

Raveena Daha (born 10 October 2003) is an Indian actress and dancer who predominantly works in Tamil television and films. She is best known for her role, Shakthi on Star Vijay's soap opera Mouna Raagam 2. Daha is also known for her roles in films such as Katha Solla Porom (2016), Ratsasan (2018) and Demon (2023).

== Career ==
Raveena Daha started her career as a contestant in the Zee Tamil dancing reality show Dance Jodi Dance. She acted in the television serial Poove Poochudava playing the role Durga. She made her lead acting debut in the movie Katha Solla Porom (2016) and she was also featured in the film Ratsasan (2018). She played the lead role in the serial Mouna Raagam 2 which aired on Star Vijay. In that serial, she plays the role of Sakthi Velan or Sakthi Karthik Krishna who was played by Baby Krithika.

In October 2023, she participated in the reality show Bigg Boss 7 as a contestant. However on day 91 of the show she was evicted from the reality show.

In 2024, she participated in dancing competition Jodi Are U Ready as an contestant in Star Vijay and emerged as the 1st runner-up.

== Filmography ==
=== Films ===
Year	Films	Role	Notes
2014	Poojai	Unknown	uncredited roles
2014	Jilla	student	uncredited roles
2015	Puli	Marudheeran's sister	
2016	Katha Solla Porom	Anitha	Debut as lead actress
2018	Ratsasan	Sharmi	
2019	Rakshasudu	Sharmi	Telugu film
2021	Enemy	Young Anisha	
2023	Demon	Mahima	
2023	Pizza 3: The Mummy	Ghost	

=== Television series ===
Year	Title	Role	Channel	Notes
2009	Thangam		Sun TV	Special Appearance
2017–2019	Poove Poochudava	Durga	Zee Tamil	
2021-2023	Mouna Raagam 2	Shakthi (Sathya)	Star Vijay	Lead
2024	Vera Maari Office season 2	Jenny	Aha	
2024-2025	Vera Maari Trip	Jenny	Aha	

=== Television shows ===
Year	TItle	Channel	Role	Notes	Ref
2016	Dance Jodi Dance Season 2	ZeeTamil	Contestant		
2022	Super Singer Season 9	Star Vijay	Guest		
2023	Start Music Season 4	Star Vijay	Contestant		
2023	Cook with Comali Season 4	Star Vijay	Comali		
2023	Bigg Boss Tamil Season 7	Star Vijay	Contestant	Evicted Day 91	
2024	Jodi Are U Ready	Star Vijay	Contestant	1st Runner-Up	
2024	Anda Ka Kasam	Star Vijay	Participant		
2024	Pandigai Palagaram Are U Ready	Star Vijay	Participant		
2025	Dance Jodi Dance Reloaded season 3	Zee Tamil	Contestant	Eliminated week 20	

== See also ==
- List of Indian television actresses
