= Manimegalai =

Indian television presenter and entertainer

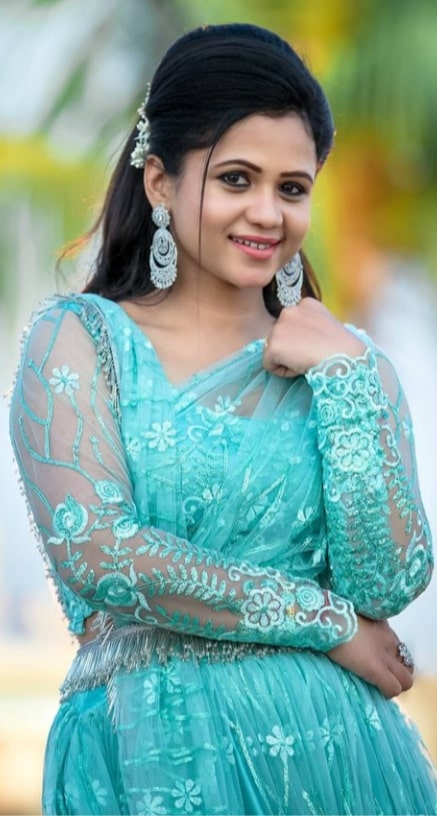
- Manimegalai in 2021
- Born: Tiruppur, Tamil Nadu, India
- Education: SRM Institute of Science and Technology (Vadapalani Campus)
- Occupations: Television Presenter, YouTuber, Video Jockey, Entertainer
- Years active: 2009 – present
- Known for: Star Vijay, Sun Music, Sun TV, Zee Tamil
- Spouse: Hussian S K (M.2017)

YouTube information
- Channel: Hussain Manimegalai
- Years active: 2020- Present
- Subscribers: 2.08 Million
- Views: 404.35 Million
- Last updated: 23 September 2024

Manimegalai is an Indian television presenter and video jockey who is working in Tamil television industry. Since 2010, she has regularly been a host for shows on Sun Network before joining Star Vijay in 2019.

She became widely recognised for her participation as a comali in Cooku with Comali along with hosting programs on Vijay TV.

== Personal life ==
Manimegalai was born in Tiruppur district, Tamil Nadu to businessman Ramaayyappan and Jothimani. She has a younger sibling, Gunamani, who is a Visual Communications graduate. Until class 3, Manimegalai studied in Coimbatore, and then moved to Chennai with her family and continued her schooling at Shanthosh Vidyala Matriculation School. She completed her MBA(dual) in HR & Finance from SRM university (Vadapalani Campus).

While at college she started performing as a video jockey on Sun Music. She met assistant choreographer Hussain Shaik Kadhar in 2017, and the couple got married the same year.

== Career ==
=== Television ===
Manimegalai debuted as a Video Jockey on 30 December 2009 at the age of 17 and hosted her first program called Super Hits on Sun Music. She then hosted live shows and reality shows on Sun Music, namely Franka Sollata, Black, Kollywood Diaries, etc.

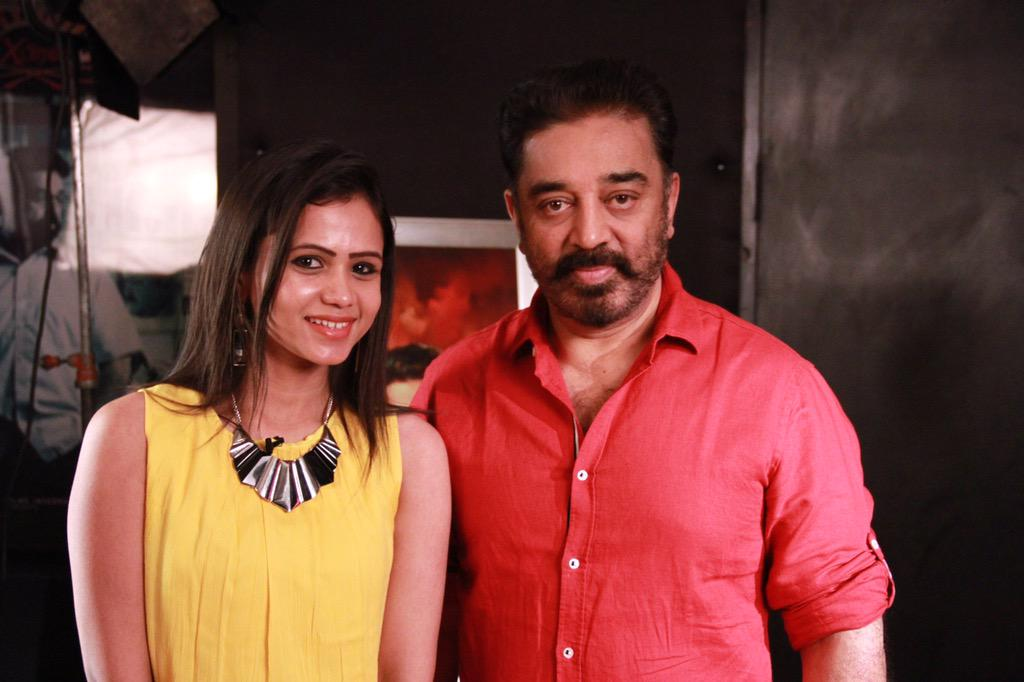
Manimegalai while interviewing Kamal Haasan.

She rose to fame as a television anchor after hosting several live shows and celebrity interviews.

In 2016, Manimegalai was awarded the Best Anchor by the World Human Integration Council. She received the award from the then governor of Tamil Nadu Dr.K.Rosaiah. She was nicknamed Anchor Superstar by her fans.

She left Sun Network in January 2019 after working there for 9 years to participate in a reality show named Mr. And Mrs. Chinnathirai along with her husband on Vijay Television.

Manimegalai and Hussain were awarded the 2nd runner up and were appreciated for their finale performance in Mr. and Mrs. Chinnathirai. After which, she hosted some special shows and a reality show on Vijay Television. She also participated in the cooking reality show Cooku with Comali as a Comali for three seasons. Later, in season 5, she co-hosted the program alongside Rakshan.

Manimegalai quit as the host of Cooku with Comali following a disagreement with a, Priyanka Deshpande.

In 2025, Manimegalai began her journey with Zee Tamil and became a co-host for Dance Jodi Dance Reloaded season 3.

=== Public shows/events ===
Manimegalai also host other events like college cultural, audio launches and award functions. She hosted her first audio launch of the movie Tik Tik Tik in Jan 2018, and continued hosting numerous other audio launches and success meets of Kollywood movies, including '96 success meet.

She also participates in comedy debate talk shows. Her first debate talk show was on 31 May 2019.

=== Acting ===
Manimegalai was initially chosen for the serial Bharathi Kannamma by director Praveen Bennet for the role of Venba (played by Farina) which she turned down. On request by the director, she accepted to make a single shot appearance confronting the male lead's mother character.

=== YouTube ===
Manimegalai and Hussain started the YouTube channel Hussain Manimegalai on 4 June 2020. A short clip from one of the videos of Hussain Manimegalai channel was posted on YouTube India's social media handles.

Hussain Manimegalai YouTube channel had gained over a million subscribers and over 100 million views in total within a year of its start.

== Shows ==
=== Selected television ===
Telecast Year	Title	Role	Telecast Channel	Notes
2010–2011	Super Hits	Host	Sun Music	Debut Show
2011	Vazhthalam Vanga	Host	Sun Music	Bday wishes are conveyed
2012–2013	Vettipechu	Host	Sun Music	2 VJs discuss the gossips of cinema industry and celebraties
2012–2013	Kollywood Diaries	Host	Sun Music	Interview with Celebrities. Notably interviewed Kamal Haasan when she was 21 years.
2012–2014	Isaiyodu Vilaiyadu	Host	Sun Music	Live game show
2013	Pattu.com	Host	Sun Music	The audience comments in social media are read
2013	Knock Knock	Host	Sun Music	Prank show
2013–2014	Vanakkam Sunmusic	Host	Sun Music	Morning show
2014	Run Tamizha Run (RTR)	Host	Sun Music	The host raises voice against social injustices and creates social awareness
2014	Call Mela Kasu	Host	Sun Music	Game show
2014	Time Pass	Host	Sun Music	The hosts discuss the gossips
2014	Hot Seat	Host	Sun Music	Software based live game show
2014	Take it Easy	Host	Sun Music	Only for few days
2014	Galatta Kudumbam	Host	Sun TV	Reality Show with Serial Families
2014–2017	Pudhu Padam Epdi Iruku	Host	Sun TV	The host reviews the newly released films
2014–2017	Pudhu Padangal	Host	Sun TV	Popular scenes from new movies are played
2014–2015	Oh My Gawd (OMG)	Host	Sun Music	Updated version of Vettipechu
2014–2015	Love Today	Host	Sun Music	It is all about love and love stories
2015	Black	Host	Sun Music	Exploring Haunted places.
2015	Hot Seat 2	Host	Sun Music	Season 2 of the popular game show
2015	Suyambulingam Engira Kamal Haasan	Host	Sun Music	Papanasam special
2015	Franka Sollata	Host	Sun Music	Film stars talk about their personal life
2015–2016	Music4u	Host	Sun Music	Viewers choice music is played
2016	Kids Corner	Host	Sun Music	Only for few days
2016	Vazhthukal	Host	Sun Music	Bday wishes are conveyed.
2016–2017	Cinema Special	Host	Sun News	Interview with Kollywood Celebrities. Notably interviewed Vivek Oberoi
2016–2018	Freeyah Vidu	Host	Sun Music	The host will ask questions and the day's topic is discussed.
2018	Hit List	Host	Sun Music	The hit songs of the movies are played
2018	Semma Morning	Host	Sun Music	Morning show
2018	Kollywood Central	Host	Sun Music	
2018	One by Two	Host	Sun Music	The hosts explore various fields of work
2019	Mr and Mrs Chinnathirai 1	Contestant with Hussain	Star Vijay	2nd Runner-Up
2019	Thala Deepawali	Host	Star Vijay	Diwali Special Show
2019	Vijay Natchathira Kondattam	Host	Star Vijay	In various places such as Thoothukudi, Kanyakumari, Dharmapuri and Hosur.
2019–2020	Kalakka Povathu Yaaru? Champions 2	Host	Star Vijay	Comedy show
2019–2020	Cooku with Comali (season 1)	Comali	Star Vijay	Cooking - Comedy reality show
2020–2021	Cooku with Comali (season 2)	Comali	Star Vijay	Missed shooting few episodes due to an injury and returned only to finale
2020	Bharathi Kannamma	Manimegalai	Star Vijay	Guest Appearance for 1 episode
2020	Karthiyudan Ulavar Thirunal	Herself	Star Vijay	Pongal special show with actor Karthi
2020	Idhu Enga Aattam	Host	Star Sports Tamil	Ipl special show
2021	Super Singer 8	Host	Star Vijay	Only for grand launch
2021	Kadhale Kadhale	Participant along with Hussain	Star Vijay	Valentine's Day Special
2021	Idhu Enga Aattam with Comali	Host	Star Sports Tamil	Only for a few episodes.
2021	Single Ponnunga	Host	Star Vijay	One day special show
2021	Theri Baby	Host	Star Vijay	One day Special show for kids
2021	Mr and Mrs Chinnathirai 3	Host	Star Vijay	Only for few episodes
2021	Star Kids	Santosh Subramaniam Hasini	Star Vijay	One day special show
2021	Mathiyanam Na Mass	Host	Star Vijay	Ayudha poojai special show
2021	Vijay Pallikoodam	Student	Star Vijay	Vijayadashami special show
2021	Deepavali Sirappu Pattimandram	Speaker	Star Vijay	Deepavali special show
2021	Pandian Stores Deepavali Kondattam	Host	Star Vijay	Deepavali special show
2021	Vijay Parambarai	Host	Star Vijay	Deepavali special show
2021	Pasikithu Lah	Host	Astro Vinmeen	Deepavali special show.
2021	Comedy Mandram	Speaker	Astro Vinmeen	Deepavali special show
2021	Namma Veettu Thiruvizha	Host	Star Vijay	Sunday special show
2021	Christmas Kondattam	Host	Star Vijay	Christmas Celebration along with Velan Movie team
2021	Christmas Sirappu Pattimandram	Speaker	Star Vijay	Christmas Special
2022	Anbarivu New Year Special	Host	Star Vijay	Newyear Special with Anbarivu Movie team
2022	Samsaaram Athu Minsaaram	Participant along with Hussian	Star Vijay	New Year Special
2022	Pongal Sirappu Pattimandram	Speaker	Star Vijay	Pongal Special
2022	Comedy Mandram	Speaker	Astro Vinmeen	Pongal special
2022	Enga Veetu Boss	Host	Star Vijay	One day special show with bigg boss contestants
2022	Cook with Comali (Season 3)	Comali	Star Vijay	Cooking - Comedy reality
2023	Cook with Comali (Season 4)	Comali / Co - Host	Star Vijay	Cooking - Comedy reality show. Quit as comali, came back as a co-host
2024	Cook with Comali (Season 5)	Host	Star Vijay	Cooking- comedy reality. Quit before finals.
2025	Dance Jodi Dance Reloaded season 3	Co-Host	Zee Tamil	Dance reality show

Manimegalai has also hosted many special shows on festivals and movie promotion shows for Vijay TV, Sun TV, Sun News, K TV and Sun Music.

She has also participated in various reality shows as guest in Sun Network as well as Vijay Television.

=== YouTube ===
Telecast Year	Title	Role	Telecast Channel	Notes
2018	First Information Report (FIR by MM)	Host	Galatta Tamil	
2021	Happy Foods for Happy Times with Chef Damu	Herself	Behindwoods TV	
2021	Behindwoods Celebrity Cricket Championship	Host	Behindwoods TV	
2022	Marakka Mudiyatha Kalyanam	Host	Behindwoods TV	Only few episodes
2023	Behindwoods Isai Maamannan AR Rahman	Host	Behindwoods TV	AR Rahman Fans Festival
2024	Mother's Day - 2024	Host	Behindwoods TV	

Manimegalai has also hosted interviews and fans festivals of movie actors for Behindwoods TV YouTube channel.

=== Award shows ===
Year	Title	Role	Telecast Channel	Notes
2018	Edison Awards	Host	Kalaingar TV	Award Function by mytamilmovie.com
2018	Tea Kadai Cinema Awards	Host	-	Award Function
2018	Techofes Awards	Host	-	Award Function by Anna University
2020	MaathareT20	Host	Kalaingar TV	Award function for women by Karpaga Vinayaka College
2021	MaathareT21	Host	Kalaingar TV	Award function for women by Karpaga Vinayaka College
2021	Behindwoods Gold Icon Awards	Host	Vijay Television / Behindwoods TV	Award Function
2022	Galatta Digital Star Awards	Host	Galatta Tamil	
2023	Behindwoods Gold Hall of Famers	Host	Behindwoods TV	
2023	Behindwoods Gold Icon Awards	Host	Behindwoods TV	
2024	Behindwoods Gold Icons Awards	Host	Behindwoods TV	

=== Album songs ===
Telecast Year	Title	Role	Telecast Channel	Notes
2022	Scene-u Singaari	Guest Appearance	Media Masons	

== Awards and nominations ==
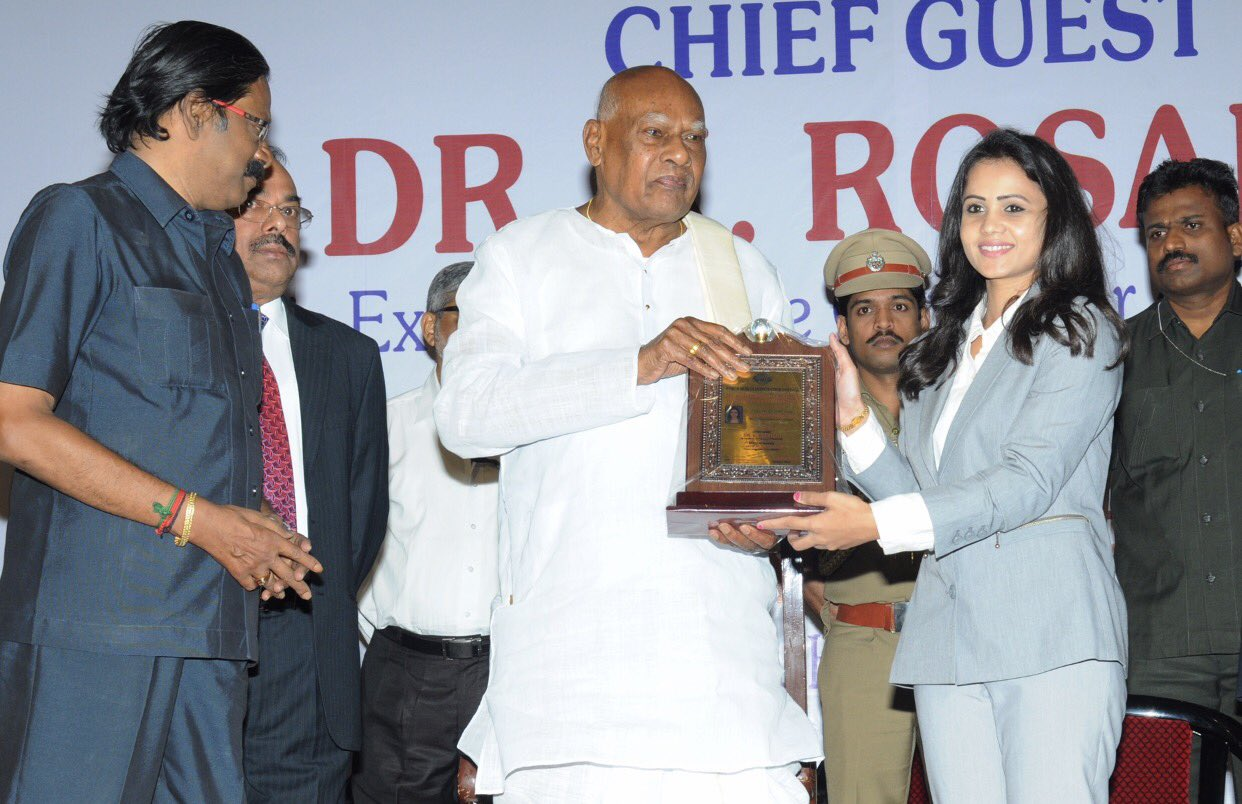
Best Anchor 2016 award from Governor

Year	Award	Category	Channel/show	Result	Notes
2010	Vivel Miss Chinnathirai Awards	Miss Beautiful Hair		Won	A beauty pageant event
2016	World Human Integration Council Award of Excellence	Best Anchor	Sun Music	Won	Received from the hands of then Governor Dr.K.Rosaiah
2017	Times of India	Chennai Times 15 Most Desirable Women on Television 2017		14th Position	This was the first edition
2018	Times of India	Chennai Times 15 Most Desirable Women on Television 2018		14th Position	
2018	Alegria Awards	Best Anchor	Sun Music	Won	
2018	Galatta Nakshatra Awards	Best Host Female	Sun Music	Nominated	Withdrew herself out of the voting when she was leading in first position
2020	Indiaglitz	Desirable Women on TV		Featured	
2021	Blacksheep Awards	Entertaining Star Couple	Hussain Manimegalai YouTube Channel	Won	Received along with her husband Hussain
2021	Behindwoods Gold Icon Awards	Best Digital Content Creator	Hussain Manimegalai YouTube Channel	Won	Received along with her husband Hussain
2021	Vijay Television Awards	Favourite Comedian (Non-fiction)	Cooku with Comali, Vijay TV	Nominated	Only female to be nominated in the category
2022	Blacksheep Awards	Favourite Star Couple Vlogger	Hussain Manimegalai YouTube Channel	Won	Received along with her husband Hussain
2022	Galatta Digital Stars 2022	Peoples Most Admired Couple on Digital Media	Hussain Manimegalai YouTube Channel	Won	Received along with her husband
2022	Galatta Iconic Women of Television 2022	Favourite Anchor	Vijay TV	Nominated	Award show honouring women of television on Women's day
2022	7th Annual Vijay Television Awards	Best Anchor - Female	Vijay TV	Nominated	
2024	Behindwoods Gold Icons	Most Popular Person on Reality Television		Won	
