= Jodi Are U Ready =

- Genre: Reality; Dance show
- Presented by: Rio Raj (S1-S2); Angelin (S1-S3); Rakshan (S3)
- Judges: Meena (S1); Sridevi Vijaykumar (S1-S3); Sandy (S1-S3); Laila; Nikki Galrani; Rambha (S2-S3)
- Country of origin: India
- Original language: Tamil
- No. of seasons: 3
- No. of episodes: 35

Production
- Camera setup: Multi-camera
- Running time: approx. 60 minutes per episode

Original release
- Network: Star Vijay
- Release: 20 January 2024 – present

Related
- Jodi No.1

Jodi Are U Ready is an Indian Tamil-language reality television dance competition show and is the eleventh part of Jodi No.1. It premiered on 20 January 2024, and airs on Star Vijay every Saturday and Sunday. It is also available for streaming on Disney+ Hotstar. The first season premiered on 20 January 2024, and ended on 28 April 2024 with 29 episodes.

The second season premiered on 25 January 2025 and ended on 4 May 2025 with 29 episodes. The season was won by Abhinav and Rani Kumari, while Gowri Shankar and Ananya emerged as the runner up of the show. Gurunath and Arunima won third place.

The third season of this show is premiered 7 February 2026.

== Overview ==
Season	Episodes	Original Broadcast		Winner	Runner up
Season	Episodes	First Aired	Last Aired	Winner	Runner up
1	29	20 January 2024	28 April 2024	Dhanush & Justina	Vignesh & Raveena Daha
2	29	25 January 2025	4 May 2025	Abhinav & Rani Kumari	1.Gurunath & Arunima 2.Gowri shankar & Ananya
3	26	7 February 2026	3 May 2026	Shashank & Chahat	Anish & Harshitha achari

== Judges and hosts ==
=== Judges ===
- Meena (Season 1)
  - Indian actress who predominantly works in Tamil films.
- Sridevi Vijaykumar (Season 1-)
  - Actress and television personality.
- Sandy (Season 1-)
  - Indian choreographer, dancer and actor who works primarily in Tamil cinema and television. Sandy Master gained popularity after his participation as a contestant in the Bigg Boss 3.
- Laila (Season 1; Guest)
  - Indian Indian actress known for her works in Tamil, Telugu, Malayalam, Kannada and Hindi films.
- Nikki Galrani (Season 1; Guest)
  - Indian actress known for her works in Tamil and Malayalam films.
- Rambha (Season 2-)
  - Indian actress who predominantly works in Tamil and Telugu films.

=== Hosts ===
- Rio Raj (Season 1-2)
  - Indian actor and video jockey, who has appeared in Tamil language films and television.
- Angelin (Season 1-3)
  - Tamil television anchor. She appeared in Sun TV as a television shows.
- Rakshan (Season 3)

== Season 1 ==
The first season was launched on 20 January and held its finale episode on 28 April 2024. Rio Raj and Angelin were as hosts of the show which was judged by Actress Meena, Choreographer Sandy Master and Sridevi Vijaykumar.

The show was won by duo Dhanush and Justina., while Vignesh and Raveena Daha finished in second place. Prajwal and Ramya won third place. Actresses Nikki Galrani and Sayyeshaa also appeared as a special guest and judge during the grand finale.

=== Contestants ===
List of contestants and celebrities.

#	Jodi		Week entered	Week exited	Status	Zone	Encounter faced	Top Jodi won - week
#	Contestants	Celebrities	Week entered	Week exited	Status	Zone	Encounter faced	Top Jodi won - week
1	Dhanush	Justina	Week 2	Week 15	Winner	–	1	3 (Week 9, 12, 13)
2	Vignesh	Raveena Daha	Week 2	Week 15	1st Runner-Up	–	1	2 (Week 5, 7)
3	Prajwal	Ramya Kole	Week 2	Week 15	2nd Runner-Up	–	2	2 (Week 4, 10)
4	Priyadharshan	VJ Tharshika	Week 2	Week 15	3rd Runner-Up	–	2	2 (Week 6, 8)
5	Vinith	Krishna Shilpa	Week 2	Week 15	4th Runner-Up	–	1	1 (Week 3)
6	Kabeer	Dolly	Week 2	Week 14	Evicted	Diamond Zone	5	—
7	Rishi	Deepika Deedoll	Week 2	Week 13	Evicted	Diamond Zone	2	1 (Week 11)
8	Mohan	Divyadharshini	Week 2	Week 8	Encountered	Gold Zone	3	—
8	Mohan	Divyadharshini	Week 11	Week 12	Evicted	Diamond Zone	3	—
9	Prashanth	Thamizhselvi	Week 2	Week 4	Encountered	Silver Zone	3	—
9	Prashanth	Thamizhselvi	Week 7	Week 10	Re-encountered	Gold Zone	3	—
9	Prashanth	Thamizhselvi	Week 11		Evicted	Diamond Zone	3	—
10	Kalai	Deepika Damu	Week 2	Week 9	Encountered	Gold Zone	5	—
10	Kalai	Deepika Damu	Week 11		Evicted	Diamond Zone	5	—
11	Shubham	Reshma	Week 2	Week 6	Encountered	Silver Zone	2	—
11	Shubham	Reshma	Week 7		Evicted	Gold Zone	2	—
12	Sohail	Shubangi	Week 2	Week 5	Encountered	Silver Zone	1	—
12	Sohail	Shubangi	Week 7		Evicted	Gold Zone	1	—

=== Top Jodi Of The Week ===
Week	Jodi	Light	Zone	Special power	Round		
3	Jodi	Light	Krishna Shilpa & Vinith	Green	Silver	No Encounter	First look (Introduction round)
4	Prajwal & Ramya Kole	Green	Encounter	Dance Express	Silver		
5	Raveena Daha & Vignesh	Green	Encounter	90's Hits	Silver		
6	Tharshika & Priyadarshan	Green	Save	2 in 1	Silver		
7	Raveena Daha & Vignesh	Green	Gold	No Encounter	Double Dhamaka (Wildcard Round)		
8	Tharshika & Priyadarshan	Green	Gold	Save	Keep in Touch		
9	Dhanush & Justina	Green	Gold	Save	2K Trending		
10	Prajwal & Ramya Kole	Green	Gold	Save	Naattukuthu		
11	Rishi & Deepika Deedoll	Green	Diamond	No Encounter	Style Style (Wildcard Round)		
12	Dhanush & Justina	Green	Diamond	No Encounter	Creative Property Round		
13	Dhanush & Justina	Green	Diamond	No Encounter	Triples Round		

=== Notes ===
1. Grand Launch (episode 1) and introduction of female contestants of this season (episode 2) on week 1
2. Bidding process for selecting male contestants by female contestants (episode 3) and Introduction of Jodi (episode 4) on week 2

=== Wild Card Round ===
S.No	Jodi	Evicted week	Status	Evicted (zone)	Round (zone)	
1	Jodi	Prashanth & Tamizhselvi	Week 4	Selected	Silver	Double Dhamaka (Gold Zone)
2	Sohail & Shubangi	Week 5	Evicted		Silver	Double Dhamaka (Gold Zone)
3	Shubham & Reshma Muralidharan	Week 6	Evicted		Silver	Double Dhamaka (Gold Zone)
4	Mohan & Divyadharshini	Week 8	Selected	Gold	Style Style (Diamond Zone)	
5	Kalai & Deepika	Week 9	Evicted	Gold	Style Style (Diamond Zone)	
6	Prashanth & Tamizhselvi	Week 10	Evicted	Gold	Style Style (Diamond Zone)	
Wildcard Entry Closed

== Season 2 ==
The second season of the Jodi Are U Ready show, it is premiere on 25 January 2025 on every Saturday and Sunday. Rambha, Sandy Master and Sridevi Vijaykumar are the judges of the show. Rio Raj and Angelin return as the hosts.

=== Contestants ===
#	Jodi		Week entered	Week exited	Status	Zone	Encounter faced	Top Jodi Won - Week
#	Contestants	Celebrities	Week entered	Week exited	Status	Zone	Encounter faced	Top Jodi Won - Week
1	Abhinav	Rani Kumari	Week 2	Week 15	Winner	-	2	2(week 3,12)
2	Gowri shankar	Ananya	Week 2	Week 15	1st Runner-Up	-	1	3 (Week 8,9,14)
3	Gurunath	Arunima	Week 2	Week 15	1st Runner-Up	-	1	2 (Week 4,6)
4	Avinash	Deeshal	Week 2	Week 15	2nd Runner-Up	-	-	3(Week 5,7,13)
5	Vijay	Shreya	Week 2	Week 15	3rd Runner-Up	-	-	-
6	Aravind	Riya Ruth	Week 2	Week 14	Evicted	Diamond Zone	1	-
7	Pradeep	Priyanka	Week 3	Week 14	Evicted	Diamond Zone	-	-
8	Manikanta	Harshita	Week 6	Week 12	Evicted	Diamond Zone	1	-
9	Sanjay	Athira	Week 2	Week 8	Evicted	Gold Zone	2	-
10	B-Trixx	Akshitha	Week 2	Week 8	Evicted	Gold Zone	2	-
11	Bhaskar	Kavya	Week 2	Week 5	Evicted	Silver Zone	2	-
12	Sandy Sundar	Anshitha	Week 2	Week 4	Evicted	Silver Zone	1	-
13	Manikanta	Jasmeen	Week 2	Week 4	Disqualified	Silver Zone	0	-

== Season 3 ==
The third season of the Jodi Are U Ready show, it is premiere on 7 February 2026 on every Saturday and Sunday at 18:30. Sandy, Rambha and Sridevi Vijaykumar returned to the judging panel, Angelin returned as the host along with a then a second new host Rakshan.

== Production ==
=== Auditions ===
It is a dancing talent hunt for the men of age group under the 18. The major auditions took place on 26 November 2023 in Madurai, 3 December 2023 in Coimbatore and 17 December 2023 in Chennai. After the audition round, there several rounds of performances take place with eliminations as a process to select the title winner of the season.

=== Contestants ===
#	Jodi		Week entered	Week exited	Status	Zone	Encounter faced	Top Jodi Won - Week
#	Contestants	Contestants	Week entered	Week exited	Status	Zone	Encounter faced	Top Jodi Won - Week
1	Chahat	Shashank	Week 2	-	winner	-	2	
