= Aan Paavam Pollathathu =

2025 Tamil film

- Theatrical release poster
- Directed by: Kalaiarasan Thangavel
- Written by: Kalaiarasan Thangavel; Sivakumar Murugesan (Dialogues)
- Screenplay by: Sivakumar Murugesan; Kalaiarasan Thangavel
- Story by: Sivakumar Murugesan
- Produced by: Vedikkaranpatti S. Sakthivel
- Starring: Rio Raj; Malavika Manoj
- Cinematography: Madhesh Manickam
- Edited by: Varun KG
- Music by: Siddhu Kumar
- Production company: Drumsticks Productions
- Distributed by: AGS Entertainment
- Release date: 31 October 2025
- Running time: 122 minutes
- Country: India
- Language: Tamil

Aan Paavam Pollathathu (transl. Sin against Men is Dangerous) is a 2025 Indian Tamil-language romantic comedy film directed by Kalaiarasan Thangavel in his directorial debut and written by Sivakumar Murugesan. The film is produced by Vedikkaranpatti S. Sakthivel under his Drumsticks Productions banner starring Rio Raj and Malavika Manoj in the lead roles, reuniting after Joe (2023).

The film's music is composed by Siddhu Kumar, with cinematography handled by Madhesh Manickam and editing by Varun KG.

Aan Paavam Pollathathu released in theatres on 31 October 2025 and received positive reviews from critics.

== Plot ==
Siva, an IT professional from Chennai, marries Sakthi from Coimbatore after a progressive courtship where both admired each other's gender‑equality values. She mentions she is tired of her father's orthodox views. Siva shares a cigarette with Sakthi, symbolising their modern mindset. They marry and get settled into Siva's apartment. After about 400 days, Siva visited lawyer Narayanan to file for divorce. The first friction arises when Sakthi removed her thali, which Siva interpreted as a breach of a cultural norm. Later, she refused to cook dinner, insisting Siva join her in cooking. Siva was prioritising his work, while she spent time creating content for Instagram. Their arguments increased with Siva thinking Sakthi was spending lavishly and hiring a housemaid without consulting him. Lawyer Narayanan brushes off these issues as they are trivial and common marital disagreements and insufficient for divorce.

Siva then hints that more serious incidents followed. The first clash erupts at a relative's family function. Sakthi naïvely sits with one leg crossed over the other and is wearing a saree with a sleeveless blouse, which the elders from village deem as disrespectful. Siva's parents ask him to tell her to sit without crossing her legs. When he does, she points out that Siva's relatives are at fault for staring at her and refuses to change. Sakthi falsely claims it would not look good in her current attire to sit crossing her legs, to which Siva asks her to change her outfit, but she retorts that her choice of dress is her own and then storms out. In retaliation, Siva rudely shows up at Sakthi's friend's boutique inauguration and makes a huge scene by wearing only a lungi and flip flops, proclaiming that dressing is his choice too, leaving her embarrassed.

The second incident involves a reel Sakthi posts on social media. Siva confronts her after seeing vulgar comments by viewers, an argument erupts, and she slams the door in his face. In anger, he forwards the reel to her orthodox father, widening their rift. He gets drunk in the balcony alone and crudely blabbers while intoxicated. The next morning, a video of Siva—drunk and shouting at her father—goes viral; it was secretly recorded and uploaded by Sakthi. Sakthi begins dressing in a modern style while wearing the thali, a move Siva had demanded earlier. The third incident seems hopeful: Siva forgets their anniversary, Sakthi gets emotional, and they spend a night together, reconnecting. The fourth clash surfaces when Sakthi says she wants to share two things with him. The first one she wants to start a parlour with her friend, Rakesh and Siva realises he has to take loans to fund it. Siva refuses, but she retorts that it is her choice, asking Siva not to interfere. The argument escalates, with Siva accusing her of being a "fake feminist" who pretends independence but relies on his money, and Sakthi shouting that he's an unfit husband. Siva finally snaps, telling her to "go die" instead of pretending to be progressive, finally owning up to his misogyny. The emotional showdown spirals into tragedy: Sakthi suffers a miscarriage after the fight, and Siva learns only then that she was pregnant.

Distraught, Sakthi disappears from the hospital. Siva discovers she's under the care of lawyer Lakshmi, who—along with Sakthi—throws him out. Siva reveals that Sakthi had filed a violence‑against‑women complaint with the police, prompting him to approach lawyer Narayanan. Narayanan advises Siva to seek a compromise. It emerges that Lakshmi is Narayanan's ex‑wife; their acrimonious split included heavy alimony, a suspended law license for Narayanan (due to verbal abuse allegations), and also alienates their daughter Diya to live with Lakshmi's sister in Bengaluru. Narayanan is depressed due to silly reasons for divorce and the pain of not being allowed access to his own daughter. Narayanan's suspension has just ended, making him eligible to represent Siva. Narayanan's assistant Siddhu, using a bribed constable, fuels Sakthi's arrogance against the investigating officer to let the complaint fizzle out as frivolous.

Lakshmi, determined to nail Siva, asks assurances from Sakthi to take "all possible actions" hinting false cases for a divorce and revenge. Lakshmi files a contested divorce. In the first court hearing, Lakshmi argues that Siva's alleged domestic violence caused Sakthi's miscarriage, even though no physical assault was proven. The judge orders counseling for the couple and a fresh medical examination. Meanwhile, Lakshmi hires a detective to spy on Siva and Narayanan, but Siddhu catches the detective and decides to cooperate. Siva's parents yell at him for keeping the divorce case a secret. Siddhu tells Sakthi's father about the divorce case, prompting him to shout at her. Lakshmi uses police force to get Sakthi's father out of the house, and Sakthi cuts ties with her parents. In the second court hearing, Lakshmi presents Siva's drunken video and claims he may have beaten Sakthi while intoxicated. The judge orders an alcohol test for Siva. Lakshmi further accuses Siva of multiple mental disorders, leading the judge to mandate psychiatric evaluation, forcing Siva to prove his sanity through a battery of hospital tests. Desperate, Lakshmi hires a woman to falsely accuse Siva of adultery. Narayanan and Siddhu stage a stunt: they push Siva in front of the judge's car, getting him hospitalised, hoping to stall the case.

The judge, however, pushes for divorce and alimony, noting the law's pro‑woman bias. To protect Siva's salary and reduce alimony, Narayanan drafts a document showing Siva paying interest to money‑lenders, and a gift deed transfers his flat to his brother's name. Lakshmi and Sakthi meet feminist activist Bharathi, who surprisingly balances household chores and her activism, prompting Sakthi to reconsider. Siva, speaking with his maid, realises women need support for their choices. He later sees Sakthi working menial food‑delivery jobs for survival. Sakthi's mother reminds her unlike them, Siva never fabricated accusations against Sakthi. The case gets a new transgender judge, Alamelumangai. Siva, now willing to give Sakthi what she wants for a comfortable life, agrees to the divorce and the alimony she requested. Judge Alamelumangai calls for a final argument to explore a possible reunion. Narayanan argues that Siva is trying to adapt to the new progressive norms, and the divorce decision stemmed from ego clashes, and not due to incompatibility. He highlights the plight of men and how misandry denies them basic respect for their struggles. He emphasises that true feminism means equality and that both partners should understand each other's pressures and let go for the sake of a stronger bond.

Moved by the shift, Sakthi voices that she needs time to decide about the divorce, acknowledging that she can't fully accept Siva right now. Lakshmi also has a change of heart: she allows her estranged daughter Diya to make a video‑call to Narayanan.

Narayanan is happy to see his daughter after a long gap and Siddhu is happy for him. Lakshmi steps back, leaving the final decision to Sakthi about the divorce case. With emotions running high, Sakthi hugs Siva, letting go of their differences. The film ends with Siva and Sakthi happily reunited, watching the movie Thiruvilaiyadal. Sakthi questions Siva about the film, pointing out that it was because of Lord Shiva's mistakes that Goddess Sakthi had to separate from her husband. Siva nods, acknowledging that men are the ones who always accept mistakes for the sake of family.

== Cast ==
- Rio Raj as Siva
- Malavika Manoj as Sakthi
- RJ Vigneshkanth as Lawyer Narayanan
- Sheela Rajkumar as Lawyer Lakshmi, Narayanan's ex-wife
- Jenson Dhivakar as Lawyer Siddhu, Narayanan's friend & assistant
- A. Venkatesh as Sakthi's father
- Raja Rani Pandiyan as Thangavel, Siva's father
- Uma Ramachandran as Siva's mother
- Reshmi Karthikeyan as Sakthi's mother
- Anupama Kumar as Bharathi
- Elango Kumanan as a judge
- Aniruth as Siva's brother
- Deepa Shankar as a maid
- Anjali Ameer as Judge Alamelumangai
- Vstar Vinoth as a detective
- S. R. Kanali
- Chutti Aravind as a counsellor
- Vasanthi as SI Kalaivani
- Senthi Kumari as a constable Mallika

== Production ==
After the success of Joe (2023), Rio Raj was announced to reunite with Malavika Manoj for a yet-to-be titled romantic comedy film written and directed by Kalaiarasan Thangavel and produced by Vedikkaranpatti S. Sakthivel under his Drumsticks Productions banner. Apart from Kalaiarasan, the film has story, screenplay and dialogues written by Sivakumar Murugesan. Apart from the lead cast the film also stars Sheela Rajkumar, RJ Vigneshkanth, Vedikkaranpatti S. Sakthivel, A. Venkatesh, Kajarajan, and Jenson Dhiwakar in important roles. The technical team includes cinematographer Madhesh Manickam, editor Varun KG, and art director Vinoth Rajkumar. In mid-February 2025, through a first-look poster, the film's title was revealed to be Aan Paavam Pollathathu. The teaser-glimpse was released in theatres during the intermission of Rajinikanth starrer film Coolie (2025).

After a formal pooja ceremony production began on 3 May 2024 and got wrapped by the end of 2024.

== Music ==
Aan Paavam Pollathathu

Soundtrack album by Siddhu Kumar
- Genre: Feature film soundtrack
- Language: Tamil
- Label: Saregama
- Producer: Siddhu Kumar

Siddhu Kumar chronology
Sir (2024)	Aan Paavam Pollathathu (2025)	Aaromaley (2025)

Singles from Aan Paavam Pollathathu
- 1. "Jodi Porutham" Released: 9 June 2025; 2. "Aththaan" Released: 7 October 2025; 3. "Mana Magane" Released: 26 October 2025

The film has music composed by Siddhu Kumar in his second collaboration with Rio Raj after Joe (2023). The first single "Jodi Porutham" was released on 9 June 2025. The second video single "Aththaan" was released on 7 October 2025. The third single "Mana Magane" was released on 26 October 2025.

Track listing
No.	Title	Lyrics	Singer(s)	Length
1.	"Jodi Porutham"	Vignesh Ramakrishna	Lakshmikanth M
2.	"Aththaan"	Mu.Vi	Vaisagh, Lakshmikanth M
3.	"Mana Magane"	Rio Raj	Anthony Daasan, Gana Bala

== Release ==
=== Theatrical ===
Aan Paavam Pollathathu released in theatres on 31 October 2025. The theatrical rights were acquired by AGS Entertainment.

=== Home Media ===
Aan Paavam Pollathathu begn streaming on JioHotstar from 28 November 2025. The satellite rights were acquired by Vijay TV and Colors Tamil.

== Reception ==
=== Critical response ===
Aan Paavam Pollathathu received positive reviews from critics.

Abhinav Subramanian of The Times of India gave 3.5/5 stars and wrote "Kalaiarasan keeps things moving by focusing on character friction rather than plot gymnastics. The comedy is rooted in observable behavior [...] No scene overstays its welcome, so if one bit falls flat, a better one is right around the corner. Thankfully, that's mostly how it plays out." Akshay Kumar of Cinema Express gave 3/5 stars and wrote "Rio and Malavika have struck gold in the portrayals of their respective roles. These characters are going to stay with us for a long time. Slumps in the second half never weigh down on the film that is built on a solid premise fortified by strong characterisations and performances." Anusha Sundar of OTT Play gave 2.5/5 stars and wrote "Aan Paavam Pollathathu is a fairly entertaining watch if you take gender politics out of question. But for a film like this, which wants to put itself in a politically correct position, there is no leeway for the mistakes it makes."

== Controversies ==
During the promotional campaign of Ram and Leela, Rio Raj faced criticism on social media over his comments about feminism and his previous film Aan Paavam Pollathathu (2025). In an interview with film critic Sudhir Srinivasan, Raj discussed the criticism surrounding Aan Paavam Pollathathu and stated that "feminism is a feeling", adding that it had no fixed boundaries, principles or theories. His comments were met with backlash from sections of social media, with users accusing him of promoting misogynistic views and questioning the gender politics of his previous film.

Raj subsequently clarified that Aan Paavam Pollathathu was not intended to oppose feminism, but was about people who advocated feminism without understanding its meaning. He also stated that the film's characters were flawed and that he considered feminism to be a feeling associated with standing by one's convictions.
