= Theera Kaadhal =

2023 Indian romantic drama film

- Theatrical release poster
- Directed by: Rohin Venkatesan
- Written by: Rohin Venkatesan; G. R. Surendarnath
- Dialogue by: G. R. Surendarnath
- Produced by: Subaskaran
- Starring: Jai; Aishwarya Rajesh; Sshivada
- Cinematography: Ravivarman Neelamegam
- Edited by: Prasanna GK
- Music by: Siddhu Kumar
- Production company: Lyca Productions
- Release date: 26 May 2023
- Running time: 128 minutes
- Country: India
- Language: Tamil

Theera Kaadhal (transl. Endless love) is a 2023 Indian Tamil-language romantic drama film directed by Rohin Venkatesan. The film stars Jai, Aishwarya Rajesh and Sshivada in lead roles. The music was composed by Siddhu Kumar with cinematography by Ravivarman Neelamegam and editing by Prasanna GK. The film released on 26 May 2023.

== Plot ==
The film begins with Gautham going on a business trip to Bangalore while calling his wife Vandhana. She was stuck in traffic and cannot meet him up, while he was with his daughter Aarthi (Vriddhi Vishal). At the same time, there was a traffic jam happening where a husband, Prakash, is dropping off his wife Aaranya to the railway station, where someone crashed into his car, which made him get out and argue with the person behind. Aaranya tries to stop this but only to get slapped by Prakash. She ended up walking to the station. During one of the train breaks, Gautham stepped out to grab a drink and this was where he saw Aaranya who was also out of the station to get some fresh air and they rekindled. Turns out Gautham and Aaranya were ex-lovers who broke up due to their family disapproval, and Aaranya failing to fight for their love when her parents set up a proposal to Prakash. They both reconciled and turns out they were both going to Bangalore for a business trip. They ended up telling each other that they are married to different partners and Gautham tells her he has a daughter. Aaranya lied by saying that she is in a 'happy marriage' with Prakash.

During the trip, they both end up getting close romantically and Aaranya reveals that she lied that she is in a happy marriage and showed that Prakash abuses her. Gautham said he will be there for her emotional support. When they departed and went to their family home, things became worse for both of their married homes. Vandhana, a workaholic, spends less time with the family, which causes issues with Gautham. However, with Aaranya, Prakash abused her even more after his boss jokingly said that Aaranya was smarter than Prakash. This made Aaranya ask for a divorce from her husband, even though her parents pleaded with her not to. She told Gautham about this, which he was relieved but she tried to get closer to him which he revealed that she should move on with her life and accept that Gautham is married.

In order to be close to Gautham, Aaranya moves into the flat next to him and tries to become closer to Gautham's family, which makes Gautham worried. She also tries to get closer to Gautham which he keeps distancing from her because he realises her intentions. At the same time, Gautham tries to rekindle his relationship with Vandhana which has gone better because Aaranya told him that he is unhappy in his marriage. Vandhana ends up being pregnant with their second child. Meanwhile, Aaranya starts to become obsessive with Gautham. She keeps calling and texting him every night by emotionally manipulating him. One night, Gautham lied to Vandhana that he went out because his friend called him but, she realises that this a lie and becomes suspicious. Vandhana comes to find that Gautham and Aaranya dated during college, which made her suspicious of both. Gautham's friend Arun (Abdool Lee) told him to tell the truth but Gautham did not want to disturb her. Aaranya was helping Gautham's daughter Aarthi by telling her not to bully other people, for which Aarthi tells her that she is becoming a big sister. This upsets Aaranya. Vandhana ends up buying another SIM card to pretend to be someone else to text her husband, which further adds onto her suspicion that he is cheating on her. Aaranya meets Gautham and asked whether he really loved her which Gautham insults her and said she deserves a husband like Prakash. Aaranya tries to kill herself which Gautham stops her and apologises and comforts her, which was witnessed by Vandhana. Gautham tries to explain him and Aaranya's past which she refuses to hear and moved to her mother's place.

Gautham attempt an apology and wants to see Aarthi but Vandhana does not forgive and said he should consider how Vandhana feels. Aarthi ends up going missing because she wants to find her father, which Vandhana tells Gautham. Vandhana suspects Aaranya of kidnapping Aarthi which she has to prove her innocence. Gautham reveals that Aaranya is not responsible for Aarthi's disappearance. Aaranya heard about this and also comes to find her. Aarthi tells Aaranya that she wants her parents to be together which makes Aaranya feel guilty for wrecking their family life. Aaranya then departs to a new city and apologises to Gautham for ruining his married life. He admits that he did love her and it did not work out. Aaranya departs and tells Gautham not to hug her or see her leave, which he disappears and leaves her crying.

== Cast ==
- Jai as Gautham
- Aishwarya Rajesh as Aaranya, Gautham's ex-lover
- Sshivada as Vandhana, Gautham's wife
- Vriddhi Vishal as Aarthi, Gautham's daughter
- Abdool Lee as Arun
- Amzath Khan as Prakash, Aaranya's husband
- Sreeja Ravi as Amma
- Manobala as a newlywed
- G. Marimuthu as Aaranya's father
- Indumathy as Aaranya's mother
- RJ Ananthi as Sneha
- Vaidyanathan Padmanabhan as Rathnam
- Janani as Puja (guest appearance)

== Production ==
The film was produced by Subaskaran under the banner of Lyca Productions. The cinematography of the film was done by Ravivarman Neelamegam, and the editing of the film was done by Prasanna GK. The film was shot in Chennai and Mangalore. This film was directed by Rohin Venkatesan, who earlier directed the films Adhey Kangal and Petromax. This is the second collaboration between the director Rohin and the actress Sshivada after Adhey Kangal. The child artist Vriddhi Vishal, who earlier acted in the film Coffee with Kadhal, plays the role of Jai's daughter in this film.

== Music ==
Theera Kaadhal

Soundtrack album by Siddhu Kumar
- Released: 2023
- Recorded: 2023
- Genre: Feature film soundtrack
- Length: 15:40
- Language: Tamil
- Label: Think Music
- Producer: Siddhu Kumar

Siddhu Kumar chronology
Kannai Nambathey (2023)	Theera Kaadhal (2023)	Joe (2023)
External audio
- Theera Kaadhal Jukebox on YouTube

The music for the film was composed by Siddhu Kumar.

Track listing
No.	Title	Lyrics	Singer(s)	Length
1.	"Usuraankootil"	Mohan Rajan	Sathyaprakash	3:26
2.	"Theera Kaadhal Theme - Remember Me"	—	—	1:01
3.	"Vaalu Party"	SN Anuradha	Sathyaprakash, Prarthana Sriram	2:56
4.	"Sollaati"	Vignesh Ramakrishna	Shakthisree Gopalan	3:25
5.	"Othaiyaaga"	Vignesh Ramakrishna	Anand Aravindakshan	3:06
6.	"Oru Kanavu"	Vignesh Ramakrishna	Shakthisree Gopalan	1:46
Total length:				15:40

== Release ==
=== Theatrical ===
The film was released on 26 May 2023.

=== Home media ===
The film's digital streaming rights were sold to Netflix.

== Reception ==
Logesh Balachandran of The Times of India gave it 2.5 out of 5 stars and wrote, "Theera Kadhal is a film that has its moments but falls short of being a truly compelling and emotionally resonant love story." Bhuvanesh Chandar of The Hindu wrote, "If not for the three capable actors and Siddhu Kumar’s music, Rohin Venkatesan’s ‘Theera Kaadhal’ would have been more patience-testing than it already is."

A critic from Dinamalar gave the film a rating of 3.25 out of 5 stars, stating, "The film reminds me of many old Tamil films, and it has many predictable scenes." A critic from Maalai Malar gave the film a rating of 3.75 out of 5 stars, stating, "Jai performed well, and Aishwarya Rajesh's role was well crafted." Thinkal Menon of OTTplay gave it 3 out of 5 stars and wrote, "The dedicated performances of artists, relatable moments and convincing emotions justify the title Theera Kaadhal and make it a harmless watch."
