= Rio Raj =

Indian tamil movie actor

- Born: 17 February 1989 (age 37); Erode, Tamil Nadu, India
- Occupations: Actor; television host; Sun Music Video Jockey
- Years active: 2011–present
- Spouse: Shruthi Rio
- Children: 1

Rio Raj is an Indian actor and video jockey, who has appeared in Tamil language films and television. He often worked on shows by network Star Vijay, and Sun Music, before moving to work in Tamil cinema. He was listed by the Chennai Times as the ninth most "Desirable Man on Television 2020“.

== Career ==
Rio Raj started his career as an actor in Star Vijay's 2011 television drama Kana Kaanum Kalangal Kalloori Saalai, a spin-off of Kana Kaanum Kaalangal series. He later moved to work with Sun Music as a video jockey, hosting day-time shows such as Kaloorikalam, Suda Suda Chennai, and Free Ah Vidu among others. He returned to Star Vijay by portraying the lead role in the third season of the drama, Saravanan Meenatchi, between 2016 and 2018.

Following a supporting role in Sathriyan (2017), Raj appeared in his first lead role in a feature film through the comedy drama, Nenjamundu Nermaiyundu Odu Raja (2019), produced by actor Sivakarthikeyan. The film opened to mixed reviews, with a critic noting he makes a "decent debut". His next film Plan Panni Pannanum, another comedy drama, was delayed by the coronavirus pandemic. In October 2020, he participated in Bigg Boss (Tamil season 4). He was listed by the Chennai Times as the ninth most "Desirable Man on Television 2020“.

In 2023, he acted in Broken Script followed by the romantic drama film, Joe. The latter marked his debut as a lyricist and he calls it a major wish fulfilled from his bucket list. In 2025, he appeared in the drama Niram Marum Ulagil followed by the romantic comedy films, Sweetheart!, Love Marriage and Aan Paavam Pollathathu.

== Filmography ==
=== As actor ===
==== Films ====
Film performances
Year	Title	Role	Notes	Ref.
2016	Sawaari		Uncredited role	
2017	Sathriyan	Guna's friend		
2019	Nenjamundu Nermaiyundu Odu Raja	Shiva		
2021	Plan Panni Pannanum	Sembi		
2023	Broken Script	Thambi Durai		
2023	Joe	Joe		
2025	Niram Marum Ulagil	Athiyan		
2025	Sweetheart!	Vasu		
2025	Love Marriage	Gowtham	Cameo appearance	
2025	Aan Paavam Pollathathu	Shiva		
2026	Ram and Leela	Raghuram "Ram"		

==== Television ====
Television stint
Year	Title	Role	Network	Notes	Ref.
2011–2012	Kana Kaanum Kaalangal – Kaloori Saalai	Pazhani	Star Vijay		
2016–2018	Saravanan Meenatchi (Season 3)	Saravanan	Star Vijay	Lead Role	
2016–2018	Jodi Number One (Season 9)	Contestant	Star Vijay	3rd Runner-Up	
2017–2019	Ready Steady Po Season 1 & 2	Host	Star Vijay		
2017–2018	Wife Kaila Life	Host	Star Vijay		
2018	Jodi Number One Fun Unlimited	Host	Star Vijay		
2018	Bigg Boss Season 2 Kondattam	Host	Star Vijay	Special Show	
2019	Bigg Boss Tamil Season 3	Guest	Star Vijay		
2019–2020	Dancing Super Stars	Host	Star Vijay		
2020	90s Kids vs 2k Kids	Host	Star Vijay	Special Show	
2020–2021	Bigg Boss Tamil Season 4	Contestant	Star Vijay	2nd Runner-Up	
2021	Varutha Padatha Valibar Sangam	Host	Star Vijay	Special Show for 6th Annual Vijay Television Awards	
2021	Ready Steady Po Reloaded	Host	Star Vijay	Special Show	
2024	Jodi Are U Ready	Co-Host	Star Vijay		
2025	Iru Malargal	Varun	Sun TV		

=== As lyricist ===
Year	Title	Song	Composer	Singer	Ref.
2023	Joe	"Kovai Kulira"	Siddhu Kumar	Vineeth Sreenivasan	
2025	Sweetheart!	"Amma Song"	Yuvan Shankar Raja	Yuvan Shankar Raja, Sai Vignesh	
