= VJ Vishal =

Indian actor and television presenter

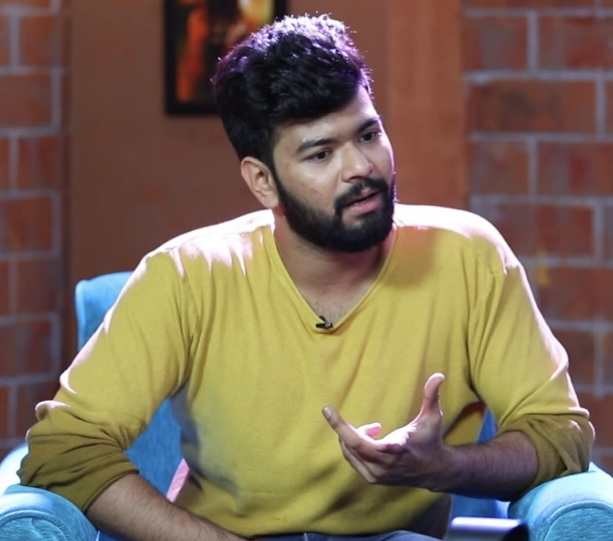
- Vishal in 2019
- Born: 13 February 1997 (age 29); Coimbatore, Tamil Nadu, India
- Education: Anna University
- Occupations: Actor, television presenter
- Years active: 2017–present

VJ Vishal (born 13 February 1997) is an Indian actor and television presenter who appears in Tamil television shows. Vishal is known best for his role as Ezhilan in the serial Baakiyalakshmi which aired on Star Vijay. He was also participated as a contestant in the Indian reality show, Bigg Boss 8 and ended up as a 2nd runner-up.

== Early life ==
Vishal was born on 13 February 1997, in Coimbatore, Tamil Nadu. Vishal completed his schooling at A.V. Meiyappan Matriculation Higher Secondary School in Chennai, he later went on to pursue a bachelor's in engineering from Anna University. Despite his academic background, Vishal's attention was always in media and television industry.

== Career ==
Vishal started his career in 2017 as a television presenter on Velicham TV and then worked on Vendhar TV. He later worked as an assistant director for a couple of shows like Athu Ithu Ethu and Kalakka Povathu Yaaru? Champions which both aired on Star Vijay. The following year in 2018, He started his acting career in the television industry with the serial Kalyanamam Kalyanam which aired on Star Vijay. He later acted in various serials such as Aranmanai Kili, Baakiyalakshmi, Thendral Vanthu Ennai Thodum.

In 2023, Vishal also appeared in a music video Emone along with Deepthi Sunaina. Later that year, Vishal participated in the popular cooking comedy show Cooku with Comali season 4 as a contestant.

In 2024, he participated in the reality show Bigg Boss 8 as contestant. Vishal emerged as the 2nd runner-up.

In early 2025, Vishal appeared in a music video Haiyoo Saachale along with Avantika. Later in the year, Vishal appeared in a music video Kasuilla.

== Filmography ==
=== Television ===
Year	Title	Role	Network	Notes	Ref(s)
2018–2019	Kalyanamam Kalyanam	Gaurav	Star Vijay	Debut	
2018–2020	Aranmanai Kili	Akash	Star Vijay		
2020–2024	Baakiyalakshmi	Ezhil	Star Vijay	Replaced by Naveen	
2021–2022	Pandian Stores	Ezhil	Star Vijay	Special appearance	
2022	Thendral Vanthu Ennai Thodum	Shakthi	Star Vijay	Cameo appearance	
2023	Ready Steady Po	Host	Star Vijay	episode 1-20	
2023	Cooku with Comali season 4	Contestant	Star Vijay	Eliminated episode 22	
2024	Pandian Stores 2	Ezhil	Star Vijay	Special appearance	
2024	Cooku with Comali season 5	Guest	Star Vijay		
2024–2025	Bigg Boss 8	Contestant	Star Vijay	2nd Runner-Up	
2025	Cooku with Comali season 6	Guest	Star Vijay		
2025	Kalakka Povathu Yaaru?	Guest			
2025	Athu Ithu Ethu	Participant			

=== Music Videos ===
Year	Title	Singer(s)	Ref.
2023	Emone	Vijai Bulganin, Aditi Bhavaraju	
2025	Haiyoo Saachale	Vignesh Mahendran	
2025	Kasuilla	Vijay JP	
