= Rohin Venkatesan =

Indian film director

- Born: Tamil Nadu, India
- Occupation: Film director
- Years active: 2017–present

Rohin Venkatesan is an Indian film director who has directed Tamil language films. He rose to fame through the romantic thriller drama Adhe Kangal (2017), and has gone on to make feature films including the horror comedy drama Petromax (2019) and the romantic drama Theera Kaadhal (2023).

== Career ==
Rohin Venkatesan apprenticed under director Vishnuvardhan in the 2010s. He made his directorial debut with Adhe Kangal (2017), produced by C. V. Kumar, and the film won critical acclaim upon release. Adhe Kangal was later remade in Telugu as Neevevaro (2018) and Kannada as Samhaara, with Rohin credited as story writer. His second film, the horror comedy Petromax with Tamannaah received mixed reviews. A remake of the Telugu film Anando Brahma (2017), Rohin mentioned his lack of comfort on handling on the project.

In 2023, Rohin made Theera Kaadhal a romantic relationship drama featuring Jai, Aishwarya Rajesh and Sshivada in the lead roles, for Lyca Productions.

== Filmography ==
Films

Year	Film	Notes
2017	Adhe Kangal	Directorial debut
2019	Petromax	
2023	Theera Kaadhal	
