= Ready Steady Po =

Indian television game show

- Original title: ரெடி ஸ்டெடி போ
- Genre: Game show
- Presented by: season 1: Rio Raj; Andrews; season 2: Rio Raj; Andrews; season 3: Rakshan (1-6); VJ Vishal (1-20); Pugazh (7-20)
- Country of origin: India
- Original language: Tamil
- No. of seasons: 3
- No. of episodes: 83

Production
- Production location: Tamil Nadu
- Camera setup: Multi-camera
- Running time: approx.48–60 minutes per episode

Original release
- Network: Star Vijay
- Release: 18 June 2017 – present

Ready Steady Po is a 2017 Indian Tamil-language television reality Game show, that airs on Star Vijay and streamed on Disney+ Hotstar. Over six years, Ready Steady Po has rolled out three seasons. This show features a two teams of young and energetic girls compete in exciting games to win.

The first season was premiered on 18 June 2017. Rio Raj and Andrews as the hosts for the first two seasons. The third season was premiered on 11 June 2023. The show is hosted by Rakshan and VJ Vishal.

== Overview ==
| Season | Episodes | Original Broadcast | |
| Season | Episodes | First Aired | Last Aired |
|---|---|---|---|
| 1 | 53 | 18 June 2017 | 24 June 2018 |
| 2 | 20 | 30 December 2018 | 19 May 2019 |
| 3 | 20 | 11 June 2023 | 22 October 2023 |

== Season 1 ==
The first season of Ready Steady Po was aired from 18 June 2017 to 24 June 2018 and ended with 53 Episodes. Rio Raj and Andrews as the hosts.

== Season 2 ==
The second season of Ready Steady Po was called Ready Steady Po Reloaded. It was aired on every Sunday at 13:00 from 30 December 2018 to 19 May 2019 and ended with 20 Episodes. The season has every episode will have two teams with three members each, and will have four interesting and entertaining rounds. Rio Raj and Andrews has officially once again been appointed as the host for the second time.

== Season 3 ==
The third season of Ready Steady Po was called Ready Steady Po Vachchu Seiyaporam. The show launched on 11 June 2023 on every Sunday at 13:30 on Star Vijay. The show is hosted by Rakshan, VJ Vishal and Pugazh. The third season of the show was ended from 22 October 2023, with 20 Episodes.
