= V. I. S. Jayapalan =

Indian film actor

- Born: 13 December 1944 (age 81); Uduvil, Jaffna, Sri Lanka
- Occupations: Writer, political commentator, actor
- Years active: 1978–present

V. I. S. Jayapalan is a Sri Lankan-Norwegian writer, political commentator and actor who has appeared in Indian films, mainly in Tamil cinema. He made his acting debut in Vetrimaaran's Aadukalam (2011) and won a National Film Award for his portrayal.

== Career ==
Jayapalan was born in Uduvil, Jaffna, Sri Lanka. He began writing in the 1970s while studying at the University of Jaffna and published his first anthology in 1986. He graduated with a degree in Economics from the university, while also leading the student union. Since then he has published at least 12 anthologies of poetry and short fiction. As the Sri Lankan Civil War escalated, he fled to Oslo, Norway in 1988 and since then he has been living in Norway as a Norwegian citizen - travelling to the south Indian state of Tamil Nadu to continue his art and literary work. In 1995, he was awarded the best immigrant writer by the Norwegian Writers’ Association, with poetry being translated into English, Norwegian as well as Sinhala. In 2009, some of his poems were translated into English and published as a book in Canada - named 'Wilting Laughter’ - along with selected poems of R. Cheran and Puthuvai Raththinathurai.

Through his friendship with film maker Balu Mahendra, he was introduced to Vetrimaaran who was keen on casting Jayapalan in his film Aadukalam (2011). After accepting the offer, he worked alongside an ensemble cast including actor Dhanush, with the film releasing to a positive response at the box office in January 2011. Critics lauded his performance as the local cock fighting team's patriarch, Pettaikaran, with Sify.com labelling him as a "revelation" and Behindwoods writing that with the "right kind of expressions and body language, he demonstrates a new type of villainy". He went on to win a special jury award at the National Film Awards in 2011, as well as garnering nominations at the Filmfare and Vijay Awards.

== Filmography ==
Year	Film	Role	Notes
2011	Aadukalam	Pettaikaran	National Film Award – Special Jury Award; Nominated, Filmfare Award for Best Supporting Actor – Tamil; Nominated, Vijay Award for Best Villain
2011	Vellore Maavattam	Minister	
2013	Pandiya Naadu	Ravi's advisor	
2013	Attahasa	Periyavar	Kannada film
2014	Jilla	Periyavar	
2014	Naan Sigappu Manithan	Kottaiperumal	
2014	Madras	Krishnappan	
2015	Touring Talkies	President	Anthology film; segment Selvi 5am Vaguppu
2015	Indru Netru Naalai	Marthandam	
2015	49-O	MLA Boominathan	
2016	Peigal Jaakkirathai	Saravanan's grandfather	
2016	Aranmanai 2	Namboothiri	
2016	Thirunaal	Durai	
2017	Valla Desam		
2019	Kuthoosi		
2020	Dhowalath		
2022	Veeramae Vaagai Soodum	Nedunchezhiyan's father	
2022	Yaanai	Samuthiram	
2022	Buffoon	Chief Minister	
2022	Adithattu	Dinkan	Malayalam film
2023	Meippada Sei	Gaja	
2024	Sir	TBA	

== See also ==
- Cinema of India
