= Meippada Sei =

- Theatrical release poster
- Directed by: Velan
- Produced by: P. R. Tamil Selvan
- Starring: Aadhav Balaji; Madhunika Rajalakshmi; Jayapalan
- Cinematography: R. Vel
- Edited by: K. J. Venkatramanan
- Music by: Bharani
- Production company: SR Harshith Pictures
- Release date: 27 January 2023
- Running time: 117 mins
- Country: India
- Language: Tamil

Meippada Sei (transl. Make it come true) is a 2023 Indian Tamil-language drama film directed by Velan and starring Aadhav Balaji and Madhunika Rajalakshmi in the lead roles. It was released on 27 January 2023.

== Cast ==
- Aadhav Balaji as Pandi
- Madhunika Rajalakshmi as Vanitha
- Jayapalan as Gaja
- P. R. Tamil Selvam
- Raj Kapoor
- O. A. K. Sundar
- Rahul Thatha
- Supergood Subramani
- Vijaya Ganesh
- Bayilvan Ranganathan
- Benjamin

== Production ==
The film was completed by 2021, and the first-look poster was released by composer D. Imman. The film was initially scheduled for release in 2022 but was postponed to 2023 due to the pandemic's ongoing impact. Prior to the film's release, actress Madhunika Rajalakashmi noted that she resonated with the script, having also faced abuse during her school days.

== Reception ==
The film was released on 26 January 2023 across Tamil Nadu. A critic from Dina Thanthi wrote "the story moves slowly in the beginning and then picks up pac". A reviewer from Maalai Malar gave the film 3 out of 5 sta/rs, noting that "the cinematographer has shot the scenes clearly" and that "he has made the song scenes enjoyable and the fight scenes scary".
