= Moon Nila =

Malaysian actress

- Born: Malacca, Malaysia
- Occupations: Actress, television personality, stage performer
- Years active: 2017–present
- Known for: Pasanga, Tamiletchumy, Iraivi Thirumagal Kaadu, Dejavu 375
- Notable work: Pasanga, Tamiletchumy, Yaar Avan, Dejavu 375, Maaya Reggai
- Awards: Malaysia Book of Records, Astro Ulagam Awards, MICA Awards, Desam Awards, Cholan Film Festival, Golden Hibiscus, MYIC Youth Icon Award, Malaysia Indian Arts & Culture Crystal Award

Moon Nila is a Malaysian Tamil actress, stage performer, and television personality.

== Biography ==
Moon Nila was born in Selangor as Anitha and worked as a nurse before entering the industry. While debuting in the film industry, she used her social media name Moon Nila. (Note: Since she was born on the 20th of the month, her rāśi is Chandra.) She starred in several soap operas such as Tamil Letchumy as Amy and Yaar Avan as Mayaa. Regarding the differences between her character in the first and second seasons of Tamil Letchumy, she said that her character was innocent and straight forward in season 1 and bold in season 2.

In 2022, she made it to the Malaysia Book of Records for playing nine different roles in the Astro Vinmeen HD soap opera Iraivi Thirumagal Kaadu, namely an old lady, a fortune teller, a rich lady, a herbalist, a demented girl, a doctor, a book seller, a teenage girl and a goddess.

== Filmography ==
| Year | Title | Role | Notes |
|---|---|---|---|
| 2021 | Ahamkara | | short film |
| 2022 | Senthozhan Sengkathirvaanan | | |
| 2023 | Rajathanthiram: The Piano | Anitha | |
| 2023 | Broken Script | Maya | Indian film |
| 2024 | Oru Kadha Sollattaa Sir | | |

=== Television ===
| Year | Title | Role | Channel | Notes |
|---|---|---|---|---|
| 2020–2021 | Tamilletchumy | Amy | Astro Vinmeen HD | |
| 2020 | Yaar Avan | Mayaa | Astro Vinmeen HD | |
| 2020 | Deepavali Pokkisham | Guest | Astro Vinmeen HD | Deepavali special |
| 2022 | Iraivi Thirumagal Kaadu | 9 roles | Astro Vinmeen HD | |
| 2023 | Dejavu 375 | | Astro Vinmeen HD | |
| 2023–2025 | Pasanga | | Astro Vinmeen HD | |

=== Music videos ===
| Year | Title | Music | Lyricist | Singer(s) | Ref. |
|---|---|---|---|---|---|
| 2020 | Nadu Road'u | Santesh | —N/a | Santesh | |
| 2020 | Rebirth Nee Enthan Anbe | Funkyshankar, Prithvi Chandrasekhar | Funkyshankar | Funkyshankar, Urmila Chandrasekhar, Chorus | |

=== Commercial ===
| Year | Organization | Role | Ref. |
|---|---|---|---|
| 2023 | Cuckoo | Herself | |

== Awards ==
| Year | Award | Category | Work | Result | Ref. |
|---|---|---|---|---|---|
| 2021 | Raaga Malaysian Star of the Month (March) | —N/a | —N/a | —N/a | |
| 2022 | Malaysia Book of Records | Most Roles in a Single Drama Series (9) | Iraivi Thirumagal Kaadu | Won | |
| 2023 | Ulagam Awards | Popular Lead Female (Telemovie/Series) | Iraivi Thirumagal Kaadu | Won | |
| 2023 | Ulagam Awards | Popular Lead Female (Telemovie/Series) | Tamiletchumy season 2 | Won | |
| 2024 | Malaysian Indian Creative Awards (MICA) | Best Actress | Senthozhan Sengkathiravaanan | Won | |
| 2024 | Malaysian Indian Creative Awards (MICA) | Popular Actress | —N/a | Won | |
