= Rebel (2024 film) =

- Theatrical release poster
- Directed by: Nikesh RS
- Written by: Nikesh RS
- Produced by: K. E. Gnanavel Raja
- Starring: G. V. Prakash Kumar; Mamitha Baiju
- Cinematography: Arunkrishna Radhakrishnan
- Edited by: Vetre Krishnan
- Music by: Songs: G. V. Prakash Kumar; OfRo; Siddhu Kumar; Manikandan Murali; Background score: OfRo; Additional score: Siddhu Kumar
- Production company: Studio Green
- Distributed by: Sakthi Film Factory
- Release date: 22 March 2024
- Running time: 141 minutes
- Country: India
- Language: Tamil

Rebel is a 2024 Indian Tamil-language political action drama film directed by debutante Nikesh RS and produced by K. E. Gnanavel Raja, under Studio Green. It stars G. V. Prakash Kumar in the lead role, alongside Mamitha Baiju (in her Tamil debut), Venkitesh V. P. (in his Tamil debut), Shalu Rahim, Karunas, Kalloori Vinoth and Adithya Baskar. It is based on true events about a rebel student in Munnar in the 1980s. The film follows Kathiresan, a college student from Munnar, who moves to Palakkad to get a better education. However, he gets into a conflict after a college fight was erupted even more when local politicians and police become involved.

Studio Green and Thirukumar Entertainment officially announced the project in December 2021 under its official title; however, the latter company soon after opted out from the venture. Principal photography commenced the same month. It was predominantly shot in Chennai, and wrapped by early-May 2023.The background score and additional background score was composed by OfRo and Siddhu Kumar. The film has music composed by G. V. Prakash Kumar, cinematography handled by Arun Radhakrishnan and editing by Vetre Krishnan.

Rebel was released on 22 March 2024 in theatres. The film received negative reviews from critics and audiences and became a box-office bomb.

== Plot ==
Kathiresan, a young man born in Munnar, moves to Palakkad for college education. After joining Government College Chittur, he meets Sara Mary John, and falls in love with her. However, a fight between Kerala's minority Tamils and majority Malayalis erupts soon after. A so-called small college fight gets out of hand when politicians and the police get involved.

== Cast ==
- G. V. Prakash Kumar as Kathiresan
- Mamitha Baiju as Sara Mary John
- Venkitesh V. P. as Antony
- Shalu Rahim as Charlie
- Karunas as Udhayakumar
- Kalloori Vinoth as Paandi
- Subramaniam Siva as Ramalingam
- Merku Thodarchi Malai Antony as Bharathi
- Adithya Baskar as Selvaraj
- Aadhira Pandilakshmi as Ramalingam's wife and Kathiresan's mother

== Production ==
=== Development ===
On 2 December 2021, K. E. Gnanavel Raja's Studio Green officially announced that they would collaborate with C. V. Kumar's Thirukumaran Entertainment for their 25th production venture. Directed by debutante Nikesh RS, the film was titled as Rebel. While G. V. Prakash Kumar would play the lead actor and also score the music, a muhurat puja was held the same day at a film studio in Chennai. The cinematography and editing would be handled by Arun Radhakrishnan and Vetre Krishnan, respectively. The following day, Nikesh stated that the film is based on true events that he had heard about a rebel student in Munnar, happening during the 1980s, and had written the script with Prakash in mind.

=== Filming ===
Principal photography began on 3 December 2021 with the first schedule in Chennai. It was predominantly shot there, and wrapped on 3 October 2023.

== Music ==
Rebel

Soundtrack album by G. V. Prakash Kumar, OfRo, Siddhu Kumar, Manikandan Murali Background score: OfRo Additional score: Siddhu Kumar
- Released: 31 July 2024
- Genre: Feature film soundtrack
- Length: 14:26
- Language: Tamil
- Label: Saregama
- Producers: G. V. Prakash Kumar, OfRo, Lakshmikanth M, Manikandan Murali

G. V. Prakash Kumar chronology
Siren (2024)	Rebel (2024)	Kalvan (2024)

OfRo chronology
DD Returns (2023)	Rebel (2024)	Devil's Double Next Level (2025)

Siddhu Kumar chronology
Joe (2023)	Rebel (2024)	Sir (2024)

Audio Jukebox
- Rebel – Jukebox on YouTube

Additional track
- Yezhuvai – Video song on YouTube

The songs were composed by G. V. Prakash Kumar, OfRo, Siddhu Kumar, and Manikandan Murali, while the background score and additional background score composed by OfRo and Siddhu Kumar. The audio rights were acquired by Saregama. The first single "Rise of Rebel" was released on 17 February 2024.

Track listing
No.	Title	Lyrics	Music	Singer(s)	Length
1.	"Azhagana Sathigari"	Ekadesi	G. V. Prakash Kumar	Velmurugan	3:56
2.	"Rise of Rebel"	Arunraja Kamaraj	G. V. Prakash Kumar, OfRo	Arunraja Kamaraj, OfRo	3:03
3.	"Chakara Muthey"	Vignesh Ramakrishna	Siddhu Kumar	Navakkarai Naveen Prabanjam, Gold Devaraj	2:32
4.	"Malakeram Poiyoru Maayandi"	Abhi Abraham	ofRO	Sarang	2:02
5.	"Yezhuvai"	Ram Ganesh	Manikandan Murali	Yogi Sekar, Manikandan Murali	2:53
Total length:					14:26

== Release ==
Rebel was released on 22 March 2024 in theatres worldwide through Sakthi Film Factory.

=== Home media ===
The post-theatrical streaming rights of the film were acquired by Amazon Prime Video.

== Reception ==
=== Critical response ===
Roopa Radhakrishnan of The Times of India gave 2.5/5 and stated that "The characterization of the professor is truly sublime, probably the best in this film". Gopinath Rajendran of The Hindu said,"Without that sense of connection, Rebel feels like an excuse to come up with a slew of disturbing scenes so they can tug at your heartstrings, making this film a rebel without a cause". Manigandan KR of Times Now gave 3.5/5 stars and stated that "Overall though, Rebel is worth watching for the hard-hitting story it looks to tell of a downtrodden group's determined fight to claim its respect". Narayani M of Cinema Express gave 2.5/5 stars and stated that "Sometimes you wonder if this rebel is a supporter of a cause or just another hero". Sowmya Rajendran of The News Minute said,"You can give such a film a long rope, but what to do if it is determined to take that rope and tie itself up into hopeless knots? There is no rebellion in imitation, and hopefully, Nikesh will do better in his next". Harshini S V of Film Companion said, "These shots pull you out of the film's world and wonder:in a film as serious and important as this, shouldn't hero worship be the least of its concerns?"
