= Nilavu =

- Directed by: Ajith Nair
- Written by: Ajith Nair
- Produced by: Krishnan Haridas; Ajith Nair
- Starring: Haridas; Sunita Nedungadi; Sreelekha
- Edited by: Nikhil Venu
- Music by: Reji Gopinath
- Production company: Convex Productions
- Release date: 30 October 2010
- Running time: 90 minutes
- Country: India
- Language: Malayalam

Nilavu (transl. Moonlight) is a 2010 Malayalam romantic film written and directed by Ajith Nair. Nilavu is the soul touching story of an indefinable relationship between two lonely individuals, who meet by chance. The whole film revolves around the strange bond that develops between them and how their relationship evolves. The film is about the emotional complexities of expatriate life in the Persian Gulf region.

== Plot ==
Hari is the protagonist of Nilavu, caught in the solitude of his own emotional disconnect. It is a journey that has led him away from the lush green, simple environs of his native Kerala to the lonesome, lost world of people brought together in a strange land, living in the shadows of synthetic dreams. Nilavu unfolds as a poignant story of the expatriate migrant workers in the Persian Gulf countries.

Lakshmi, the other protagonist, is a nature lover, married to a rich businessperson, living in Bahrain. Lakshmi enjoys all the material luxuries that money can buy, yet feels lonesome and lost in a strange land of glass and concrete, caged in a dysfunctional relationship.

The magic of Nilavu is thus woven around the lives of Hari and Lakshmi and the solitude that brings them together, each searching for an emotional anchor. How their relationship evolves and where it leads to forms the core of Nilavu's journey, exploring human emotions and the different shades of love, perception and belief.

Krishnan Haridas as ‘Hari’ and Sunita Sunil Nedungnadi as ‘Lakshmi’ bring to life the emotional complexities of expatriate life in the Arab states of the Persian Gulf. Delving deep into the psyche of the Indian community, Nilavu, through a strong supporting cast, captures the dreams, desires and aspirations of the migrant workers and families as well as the cultural ethos of the region.

== Cast ==
- Ramu
- Nandu
- Krishnan Haridas as Hari
- Sunitha Nedungadi as Lakshmi
- Sreelekha as Jyothy
- Prasanth as Jayashanker
- Sangeetha as Gowri
- Subier Shams as Raju
- Suresh as Teacher
- Karunakaran Suresh as Mr. Nair
- Remesh as Remu
- Rejith Menon as Deepu

== Soundtrack ==
Track	Song title	Singer(s)
1	"Raavin Nilaa Mazha Keezhil"	K. S. Chithra
2	"Ariyathe Onnum Parayaathe"	G. Venugopal
3	"Title Music"	Unnikrishnan, Kiran
