= Petromax (2019 film) =

2019 film by Rohin Venkatesan

- Theatrical release poster
- Directed by: Rohin Venkatesan
- Screenplay by: G. R. Surendarnath
- Based on: Anando Brahma by Mahi V Raghav
- Produced by: A. Kumar
- Starring: Tamannaah Bhatia
- Cinematography: Dani Raymond
- Edited by: Leo John Paul
- Music by: Ghibran
- Production company: Eagle's Eye Production
- Release date: 11 October 2019
- Running time: 130 minutes
- Country: India
- Language: Tamil

Petromax is a 2019 Indian Tamil-language comedy horror film directed by Rohin Venkatesan. The film stars Tamannaah Bhatia, Prem, Yogi Babu, Munishkanth, Kaali Venkat, Sathyan and TSK. It is a remake of the Telugu film Anando Brahma (2017). The film was released on 11 October 2019.

== Plot ==
Saravanan, an NRI living in Kuala Lumpur, Malaysia, arrives in India after hearing the news of the Wayanad floods. He discovers his parents in the hospital mortuary and cries. Meera, Vijay Karuppaati, Nivetha, and Santhanam are ghosts staying in their ancestral home. They are waiting eagerly for Vijay Karuppaati's wife to come home. They don't know how or when they died. A family visits their house for tenancy, but they scare the family away. The broker, Ganapathy, who deals with the house, is also scared as he spots Meera's ghost and informs the house owner, Saravanan, and his cop friend, Vetri, of their presence. Vetri is apprehensive, while Saravanan dismisses it as a concoction. Vetri conspires with Guru to force Saravanan to sell his house cheaply by fabricating and peddling the ghost story. They plan to demolish the house and build a commercial complex.

Senthil overhears Saravanan's conversation and agrees to send his three friends to stay one night at the house, and if they survive, Saravanan will pay Senthil a percentage of the sale price as a commission. But his three friends encountered the ghosts that night. Kumar is locked in the bathroom, his friend (Muthuswamy) is knocked unconscious, and another is scared away. Saravanan believes ghosts exist in the house and is about to sell it at Guru's demanded price. But Saravanan, after Senthil urges him, gives him one last chance to prove it's not haunted. Senthil and his friend Tulasi meet Kaali and Raju coincidentally at the hospital, and they all desperately need money. Senthil has to care for his amnesiac mother and needs cash for cardiac surgery to treat the hole in his heart. Paaripooranam, who poses himself as an agent of famous cinema producers in Kollywood, dupes Kaali, who is so infatuated with movies that he starts enacting the roles he watches. Thangam, a drunkard who drinks after the clock ticks 9 p.m., bets on a cricket match in an inebriated state and loses the money he saved for his son's surgery. Nandha is deaf and night-blind and often uses his flute when frightened. In an ATM robbery case, he gets caught napping while guarding the ATM when robbers loot it. The security agency that hired him tells him to repay the money lost to prevent getting banned from the agency.

As they start staying in the house, all the ghosts decide to scare them away. However, all four friends remain calm due to their peculiar habits, like Kaali, who starts acting out scenes like Vikram from Anniyan. Instead, they begin intimidating the spirits. After the first day, Saravanan inquires Senthil about the presence of ghosts and decides to give him two more days to sell the house. Vetri does not like Senthil and his group staying inside the house and sends fake spirits to scare them away. However, the real ghosts frighten the counterfeit ghosts. On the second night, Senthil and his group remain calm and scare the ghosts. However, Senthil's mother arrives at the house looking for him after the ghosts frighten the group on the third night. She is none other than Vijay Karupaati's wife.

A flashback reveals that Saravanan is their son. Saravanan gets an offer for a job in Malaysia and leaves. The couple adopted Meera, Santhanam and Nivetha since they felt alone. Saravanan returns to India and incurs a loss. So Saravanan wishes to sell the house to compensate for his business debts. Vijay Karupaati refuses to sell the house after he insults Meera and Nivetha, calling them orphans. Saravanan gets infuriated and kills the entire family by poisoning their food and burning them, excluding his mother. Meera is alive, so Saravanan smashes her face with a stone. In horror, she witnessed Saravanan murdering them.

In the present, Vetri discovers that Saravanan killed his family, but Guru kills him. The ghosts realise the reasons for their deaths and enact their revenge by killing Saravanan, Guru, and Guru's goons. When Senthil and his friends leave the house, they find a bag filled with cash in Saravanan's car. They converted the house into a retirement home. They live happily with Kamala, who recovered from amnesia, and other old pensioners, abandoned by their children.

== Cast ==
- Tamannaah Bhatia as Meera
- Prem as Saravanan
- Yogi Babu as Pandi, a fake ghost
- Ramdoss as Senthil
- Kaali Venkat as Thangam
- Sathyan as Nandha
- TSK as King Kaali
- K. S. G. Venkatesh as Vijay Karupaati
- Sreeja Ravi as Kamala
- Mime Gopi as Guru
- Livingston as Paripooranam
- Mahanadi Shankar as Police inspector
- Baby Monika as Nivetha
- Pei Krishnan as Santhanam
- Kavin Jay Babu as Vetri, Saravanan's friend
- Myna Nandhini as Shailaja
- Pudhupettai Suresh as Muthusamy
- Aathma Patrick as Kumar
- Abdool Lee as Manohar
- TSR Srinivasan as Doctor
- Sneba as Broker Ganapathy
- Yukta as Young Meera
- Vijaya Paati as Shailaja's grandmother
- Master Jashik as Thangam's son
- Sivaranjini as Vasanthi, Thangam's wife
- Devi as Senthil's sister
- Sree Sathya as Saravanan's wife
- Dharunya Shakti Suresh as Shailaja's sister
- Sharath Ravi as “Tasmac” Douglas

Cameo appearance

- Vaibhav as himself

== Production ==
The film was shot in 42 working days, and the title was revealed on 18 July 2019. It is a reference to the dialogue "Petromax lightey venumaa?" (Do you want only the petromax light?) from the 1984 film Vaidehi Kathirunthal. Leo John Paul and Ghibran, who earlier collaborated with the director's Adhe Kangal film was retained as film editor and music director respectively. Dani Raymond, the co-cinematographer of the film Achcham Yenbadhu Madamaiyada, was selected as the cinematographer, and Vinoth Rajkumar of 96 fame was selected as the art director.

== Music ==
The music is composed by Ghibran. The music rights are secured by Think Music India. A single from the film, "Malarudhu Pudhu Naale", was released on 8 October 2019.

No.	Title	Lyrics	Singer(s)	Length
1.	"Malarudhu Pudhu Naale"	S. N. Anuradha	Roshini	4:19

== Release ==
Petromax was released on 11 October 2019, clashing with two other films in the same horror genre: Iruttu and Aruvam.

== Critical reception ==
Writing for Firstpost, Sreedhar Pillai rated the film 2.5/5. He appreciating Ghibran's score and Dani Reymond's cinematography but felt Bhatia was underutilised, and concluded that "Petromax is more of a time pass comedy caper than a horror film." Thinkal Menon of The Times of India gave the film the same rating, saying, "A plot like this require[s] a few nail-biting moments, but the screenplay fails to engage audience in crucial scenes and becomes too predictable, making it a little difficult for viewers to empathise with the lead characters".
