= Broken Script =

- Theatrical release poster
- Directed by: Joe Giovanni Singh
- Produced by: Joe Giovanni Singh
- Starring: Joe Giovanni Singh; Rio Raj; Jaynesh Isuran; Moon Nila; Gunalan Morgan
- Cinematography: Saleem Bilal Jitesh
- Edited by: Ram Manikandan
- Music by: Praveen Viswa Malik
- Production company: Streetlight Pictures
- Release date: 18 August 2023
- Running time: 128 minutes
- Country: India
- Language: Tamil

Broken Script is a 2023 Indian Tamil-language thriller film directed by Joe Giovanni Singh and starring himself, Rio Raj, Moon Nila and Gunalan Morgan in the lead roles. It was released on 18 August 2023.

== Plot ==
In Singapore, a series of doctors are murdered. The police are searching for a psychopathic killer. Meanwhile, a young woman working at a travel agency devises a plan to burglarise houses with her younger brother, Thambidurai. He is captured by the killer.

== Cast ==
- Joe Giovanni Singh as Psycho
- Rio Raj as Thambidurai
- Jaynesh Isuran as Amaran
- Moon Nila as Maya
- Nabizah Jullaladin as DD
- Gunalan Morgan as Psycho

== Production ==
The film – written, produced, directed and starring Singapore-based Joe Giovanni Singh – dealt with two themes – illicit trade of human organs and the exploitation of innocent travellers by unscrupulous employees working in travel agencies.

== Release and reception ==
The film was released on 18 August 2023. A critic from Dina Thanthi gave the film a mixed review. A reviewer from Kumudam also criticised the film's making, while a reviewer from Virakesari gave the film 2 out of 5 stars. A critic from Hindu Tamil Thisai rated the film 2.5 stars out of 5. A critic from Maalai Malar called the film enjoyable.
