= Thadayam (TV series) =

2026 Tamil-language crime thriller series

- Genre: Crime thriller; True crime
- Created by: Navinkumar Palanivel
- Written by: Navinkumar Palanivel
- Screenplay by: Navinkumar Palanivel
- Directed by: Navinkumar Palanivel
- Starring: P. Samuthirakani; Sshivada
- Music by: Vibin Baskar
- Country of origin: India
- Original language: Tamil

Production
- Producer: Ajey Krishna
- Cinematography: KK And Mohankumar Palanivel
- Production company: Cocktail Cinemas

Original release
- Network: ZEE5
- Release: February 27, 2026

Thadayam is a 2026 Indian Tamil-language crime thriller streaming television series written and directed by Navinkumar Palanivel for ZEE5. Produced by Ajey Krishna under the banner Cocktail Cinemas, the series stars P. Samuthirakani and Sshivada in lead roles. The narrative is inspired by events reported in 1999 along the Tamil Nadu–Andhra Pradesh border. The series premiered on 27 February 2026.

== Premise ==
Set in 1999, the series follows a series of ritualistic midnight murders in rural villages along the Tamil Nadu–Andhra Pradesh border. The perpetrator's pattern involves stealing the mangalsutra (thali) from victims, contributing to local fear and speculation. Sub-Inspector Adhiyaman investigates the case alongside Inspector Lakshmi, as they navigate the social and psychological tensions surrounding the crimes.

== Cast and characters ==
- P. Samuthirakani as SI Adhiyaman
- Sshivada as Inspector Lakshmi
- Raj Tirandasu as Suruli
- Munnar Ramesh as DSP Gunasekaran
- Sundharpandyan as DSP Rayudu
- Prem as Ravi
- Kotravai as Suruli's Wife
- Suparna as Suruli's Sister
- Vishakan as Inspector Sandeep Reddy
- Pulipandi as Driver Palraj
- Abhishek Joseph George as Arjun

== Release ==
The official trailer was released on 19 February 2026. The series. streamed on ZEE5 from 27 February 2026 in Tamil.
