= Sweetheart! =

2025 Tamil romantic comedy film

- Theatrical release poster
- Directed by: Swineeth S. Sukumar
- Written by: Swineeth S. Sukumar
- Produced by: Yuvan Shankar Raja
- Starring: Rio Raj; Gopika Ramesh
- Cinematography: Balaji Subramanyam
- Edited by: Tamil Arasan
- Music by: Yuvan Shankar Raja
- Production company: YSR Films
- Distributed by: Five Star K. Senthil
- Release date: 14 March 2025
- Running time: 144 minutes
- Country: India
- Language: Tamil

Sweetheart! is a 2025 Indian Tamil-language romantic comedy film written and directed by Swineeth S. Sukumar in his directorial debut, starring Rio Raj and Gopika Ramesh in the lead roles, alongside Renji Panicker, Redin Kingsley, Arunachaleswaran Pa, Tulasi, Fouziee, Suresh Chakravarthy and others in supporting roles. The film has music composed and produced by Yuvan Shankar Raja under his YSR Films banner.

Sweetheart! released in theatres on 14 March 2025 to mixed reception from critics.

== Plot ==
Few years ago, Vasu and Manu meet at a concert by Yuvan Shankar Raja, quickly developing a friendship that blossomed into a romantic relationship, including intimate encounters. Vasu, having lost his mother to remarriage when he was just a toddler, finds himself unprepared for the commitments of marriage and relationships. When Manu raises the topic of marriage, Vasu draws a parallel between her behavior and that of his mother, leading him to believe that all women will eventually abandon their relationships. Consequently, he decides to end their partnership. Manu makes numerous attempts to meet with Vasu and persuade him to rethink his decision, but he avoids her entirely. A year later, they unexpectedly encounter each other at a wedding, where Manu is accompanied by her fiancé. Observing her happiness, Vasu assumes she has moved on and confronts her. In response, she angrily asserts that he will never comprehend love and commitment, declaring their relationship definitively over.

Manu is confined to her home after her family discovers her with Vasu, on Manu's birthday. In reality, Vasu had entered her home to discuss her decision to marry someone else. Additionally, Manu's niece, Deepu catches Manu speaking on the phone with Vasu. Manu soon recognises that she is exhibiting symptoms of pregnancy and reaches out to Vasu, despite their breakup. After Vasu acquires a pregnancy test kit for her, the results come back positive. Vasu suggests the possibility of an abortion; however, Manu does not wish to terminate the pregnancy, but she does not communicate this to Vasu, nor does he inquire about her feelings. Seeking guidance, Vasu turns to his sister, Dr. Geetha, for assistance. Since Manu is unable to leave her home, Dr. Geetha instructs Vasu to obtain a urine sample from her. Manu manages to use another person's phone to inform Vasu about the sample.

Vasu and his friend Senthil disguise themselves as plumbers and enter the nearby apartment of an elderly couple who are not easily distracted, instead requiring Vasu and Senthil to perform plumbing tasks. After considerable effort, with assistance from Senthil and the elderly couple, Vasu successfully retrieves the sample from Manu without attracting the attention of her parents. He submits the samples for testing, and Dr. Geetha informs him that the results are positive, indicating that the foetus is approximately three months old, making an abortion a highly risky option. Faced with limited alternatives, Vasu seeks the help of the hospital security guard, Abathpandavan, but Manu remains resolute in her desire to keep the child.

Manu's sister, Anu, aware of her sister's romantic entanglement, encourages Manu to set aside her pride and communicate with Vasu about her decision to retain the pregnancy. Manu notes that Vasu has never sought her opinion regarding the choice to either keep or terminate the pregnancy. Vasu informs her that abortion pills will soon arrive, and unable to express her true feelings, Manu reluctantly agrees to the procedure.

Meanwhile, Vasu receives an emergency signal from a neighbour he has observed from a distance but never met, prompting him to rush over, sensing a crisis. Upon breaking down the door, he discovers that the woman signaling him is pregnant and unconscious. He learns that she is a single-parent and promptly takes her to the hospital. The mother of the pregnant woman discloses that her daughter's husband abandoned her upon learning that the unborn child would suffer from a deformity syndrome and, if born, would only live for a short period. She shares that her daughter is opposed to having an abortion, despite the knowledge of her child's condition. Ultimately, the neighbour successfully gives birth. This conversation profoundly impacts Vasu, leading him to appreciate the significance of cherishing life, relationships, and commitments over mere practicality. To Vasu's astonishment, the attending doctor turns out to be his mother, who left him and his family during his childhood.

Vasu visits Manu at her home, facing resistance from her family. Manu reveals to her entire family that she is pregnant, which takes them all by surprise. Vasu urges her not to proceed with an abortion, but Manu reacts with anger, accusing him of changing his stance and disregarding her feelings. Vasu offers an apology and promises to remain committed to her. Manu's grandfather disapproves of their relationship, highlighting that Manu became pregnant prior to marriage. However, Manu's mother, Sivakami, counters her father's objections by reminding him that Manu's mother was also conceived before her wedding. Ultimately, Vasu and Manu reconcile.

== Cast ==
- Rio Raj as Vasu
- Gopika Ramesh as Manu
- Redin Kingsley as a Condom Brand Ambassador (extended cameo)
- Renji Panicker as Manu's father
- Arunachaleswaran Pa as Senthil, Vasu's friend
- Tulasi as the pregnant woman's mother
- Fouziee as Gayu, Senthil's girlfriend
- Aashik Gopinath as Teddy, Manu's fiancé
- Kathadi Ramamurthy as Manu's neighbour
- Suresh Chakravarthy as Manu's grandfather
- Reshmi Karthigeyan as Dr. M. Geetha, a gynaecologist, Vasu's sister
- R Rithu as Deepu, Manu's niece
- Mythili Sathyajith as Anu, Manu's elder sister
- Kavitha Suresh as Sivakami, Manu's mother
- Mahadev Payakkal, as Vasu and Geetha's father
- Kavinn GT as Aabathpandavan, hospital security
- Shambhavy Gurumoorthy as Vasu's neighbour, a pregnant woman
- Suma as Vasu and Geetha's mother
- Sana Udhayakumar as a patient
- Yuvan Shankar Raja in a cameo appearance in the song "I'll Be There For You"

== Production ==
In late-July 2024, Yuvan Shankar Raja announced his fourth production venture after Pyaar Prema Kaadhal (2018), Maamanithan (2022) and Pon Ondru Kanden (2024) titled Sweetheart under YSR Films banner. The contemporary love film is written and directed by debutant Swineeth S. Sukumar, starring Rio Raj and Gopika Ramesh in the lead roles, alongside Renji Panicker in his Tamil debut. The film also stars Redin Kingsley, Arunachaleswaran Pa, Tulasi, Fouziee, Suresh Chakravarthy and others in important roles. The technical team consists of the film's producer Yuvan Shankar Raja to score the music and Balaji Subramanyam to handle the cinematography, and Tamil Arasan in charge of the editing.

On 6 August 2024, it was announced that Rio had begun dubbing for his portions.

== Music ==
Sweetheart!

Soundtrack album by Yuvan Shankar Raja
- Studios: Ilaiyaraaja studios; U1 Records
- Genre: Feature film soundtrack
- Language: Tamil
- Label: Think Music
- Producer: Yuvan Shankar Raja

Yuvan Shankar Raja chronology
Aghathiyaa (2025)	Sweetheart! (2025)	Paranthu Po (2025)

Singles from Sweetheart!
- 1. "Awsum Kissa" Released: 11 February 2025; 2. "Kadhavai Thirandhaye" Released: 24 February 2025

External audio
- Sweetheart - Jukebox on YouTube

The film has music and background composed by Yuvan Shankar Raja. The first single "Awsum Kissa" released on 11 February 2025. The second single "Kadhavai Thirandhaye" released on 24 February 2025.

Track listing
No.	Title	Lyrics	Singer(s)	Length
1.	"Paint Ball"	MC Sanna	MC Sanna
2.	"Amma Song"	Rio Raj	Yuvan Shankar Raja, Sai Vignesh
3.	"Kadhavai Thirandhaye"	Madhan Karky	Yuvan Shankar Raja, Sinduri Vishal
4.	"Awsum Kissa"	Kelithee, Gana Francis	Yuvan Shankar Raja, OfRo
5.	"Oruthi"	Vignesh Ramakrishna	Yuvan Shankar Raja, Adithya RK
6.	"Kadhal Adhu Poi"	Arivu	Yuvan Shankar Raja
7.	"Torture Pro Max"	Arivu	Yuvan Shankar Raja, Arivu, Tanvi Shah
8.	"I'll Be There For You"	Na. Muthukumar	Yuvan Shankar Raja

== Release ==
=== Theatrical ===
Sweetheart! released in theatres on 14 March 2025. The film received a 'U/A' certificate from the Central Board of Film Certification.

=== Home media ===
Sweetheart! began streaming on JioHotstar from 11 April 2025.

== Reception ==
=== Critical response ===
Sweetheart! received mixed reviews from critics, who praised the lead cast's performance.

Abhinav Subramanian of The Times of India gave 2/5 stars and wrote "Director Swineeth S. Kumar seems allergic to narrative economy, transforming what should be straightforward plot points into marathon sequences. [...] Sweetheart promises more than it delivers, like a beautifully wrapped gift box containing socks. A rom-com that forgot the com and misplaced the rom." Anusha Sundar of OTTPlay gave 2/5 stars and wrote "There is a visible attempt in Sweetheart to make it a film that works for today’s times and romance. It does want to be that progressive film about complicated romances where the lovers themselves form their obstacles. But when it comes down to the last-minute silliness as a solution to the chaos it created, Sweetheart becomes sour." Sreejith Mullappilly of Cinema Express gave 2/5 stars and wrote "Sweetheart! tries to make up for its flaws with a screenplay structure that reveals information intermittently—almost like a nonlinear structure. The narrative tries to make the film look smart and profound, but the deeper you look at it, the more hollow it appears."
