= Samhaara =

- Theatrical Poster
- Directed by: Guru Deshpande
- Screenplay by: Guru Deshpande
- Story by: Rohin Venkatesan
- Based on: Adhe Kangal by Rohin Venkatesan
- Produced by: A. Venkatesh; R. Sundar Kamaraj
- Starring: Chiranjeevi Sarja; Hariprriya; Kavya Shetty; Bala Rajwadi
- Cinematography: Jagadish Wali
- Edited by: K. M. Prakash
- Music by: Ravi Basrur
- Production company: Manu Enterprises
- Distributed by: Jayanna Films
- Release date: 9 February 2018
- Country: India
- Language: Kannada

Samhaara (transl. Vanquishing) is a 2018 Indian Kannada-language romantic action thriller film directed by Guru Deshpande. It stars Chiranjeevi Sarja, Hariprriya, Kavya Shetty, Bala Rajwadi and Chikkanna. The score and soundtrack for the film is by Ravi Basrur and the cinematography is by Jagadish Wali. The film is a remake of Tamil film Adhe Kangal (2017) directed by Rohin Venkatesan.

Launched on 29 April 2017, the principal photography of the film began in May 2017. The film's summary was announced to be a revenge drama where Sarja plays two different roles, one of which is a born-blind chef who owns a restaurant. The film was shot majorly in Mangaluru and nearby coastal regions.

== Plot ==
Srishaila is a well-known blind chef and the owner of a popular restaurant in Bangalore. One night, Nandini visits his restaurant asking for leftover food for the homeless. Srishaila helps her and eventually falls in love with her daily visits. Meanwhile, Srishalia's close friend, Janaki approaches his parents and reveals her intentions of marrying Srishaila, which they accept. Srishaila decides to propose to Nandini in his restaurant, but he observes that she is in tears. She tells him that henchmen were pressing for their money, and her father had promised to return the money in three days. Srishaila promises to help out from his own savings. On the same night, Srishaila is met with an accident and is hospitalized, during which his vision is restored. He is treated for three weeks, and the hospital fee is paid out of his savings. Srishaila feels guilty and is disappointed for not helping out Nandini. When he is discharged, he is unable to locate her. When his family presses him to marry Janaki, he agrees as he also likes her from his childhood days.

Several days later, an old man walks into the restaurant telling how his daughter Nandini has been kidnapped as they were unable to return the money. Srishaila calms him down and hatches a plan to hand over his wedding jewelry, but is conned of the jewels by the kidnapper. Later, Srishaila gets to know that Nandini's father is found dead at Kanyakumari in a road accident. Srishaila decides to visit Kaniyakumari himself to get clarity about Nandini's family. He works with a constable Raja Huli, faking his identity, as a journalist investigating the road accidents where the victim remains unidentified. They decide to find the whereabouts of the old man, and they gather several clues on his hotel residence and phone number. These clues lead them to investigate the car that was involved in the accident and track down its owner as a blind man. After listening to his story, they get hold of photos of his girlfriend Anjali, and with Janaki's help, they identify her as Nandini.

They find out that the girl's real name is actually Chithrangada, a con artist who selects only blind men. She makes the blind men fall for her and then presents a story with a need for money, which the blind men give. Srishaila and Raja Huli find the commonality and pinpoint a list of potential targets. Janaki, with the help of her journalist associates, finds out the plan to con another blind man in Udupi. They immediately travel to Udupi and catch Chithrangada after several twists in the plot. The film ends with Raja Huli receiving commemorations from people for his efforts in nabbing Chithrangada, whereas Srishaila and Janaki happily get married.

== Cast ==
- Chiranjeevi Sarja as Srishaila
- Hariprriya as Nandini/Chithrangada
- Bala Rajwadi as Mama
- Kavya Shetty as Janaki
- Chikkanna as PC Raja Huli
- Tumkur Mohan
- Tabla Nani
- Dharma
- Raj Balavadi
- Yashwanth Shetty
- Aruna Balaraj
- Rockline Sudhakar
- Guru Deshpande

== Soundtrack ==
Samhaara

Soundtrack album by Ravi Basrur
- Released: 2018
- Genre: Feature film soundtrack
- Length: 19:38
- Language: Kannada
- Label: Jhankar Music
- Producer: Ravi Basrur

Ravi Basrur chronology
| Anjani Putra (2017) | Samhaara (2018) | Bhootayyana Mommaga Ayyu (2018) |

The film's background score and the soundtracks are composed by Ravi Basrur. The music rights were acquired by Jhankar Music.

Tracklist
| No. | Title | Lyrics | Singer(s) | Length |
|---|---|---|---|---|
| 1. | "Yenachariyu" | Jayanth Kaikini | Puneeth Rajkumar | 4:04 |
| 2. | "Be My Love" | Chethan Kumar | Supriya Lohith | 3:57 |
| 3. | "Jeeva Hodara" | Chethan Kumar | Vijay Prakash | 3:58 |
| 4. | "Raakshasi" | Chethan Kumar | Raghu Dixit | 3:38 |
| 5. | "Rajahuli - Theme" | Dhananjay Didag | Ravi Basrur | 1:22 |
| 6. | "Samhaara" | Chethan Kumar | Vijay Prakash | 1:39 |

== Release ==
The film released on 9 February 2018.

=== Critical reception ===
Sunayana Suresh from The Times of India give 3 stars out of 5 and says This film isn't the out and out commercial film, but it has an interesting screenplay to ensure one gets a hatke watch this weekend. Go for it, you will be entertained. A Sharadhaa of The New Indian Express scored the film at 3 out of 5 stars and wrote Kavya Shetty too does a neat job and goes along with the story. But Chikkanna, who shares a good chemistry with Chiranjeevi, is the highlight. His presence and dialogue delivery makes the film lighter as it progresses. Shyamprasad S of Bangalore Mirror gave the film a rating of 3.5/5 and wrote "It has the substance but lacks a bit on the style front. However Samhaara makes for a good entertaining watch"
