= Sai Vignesh =

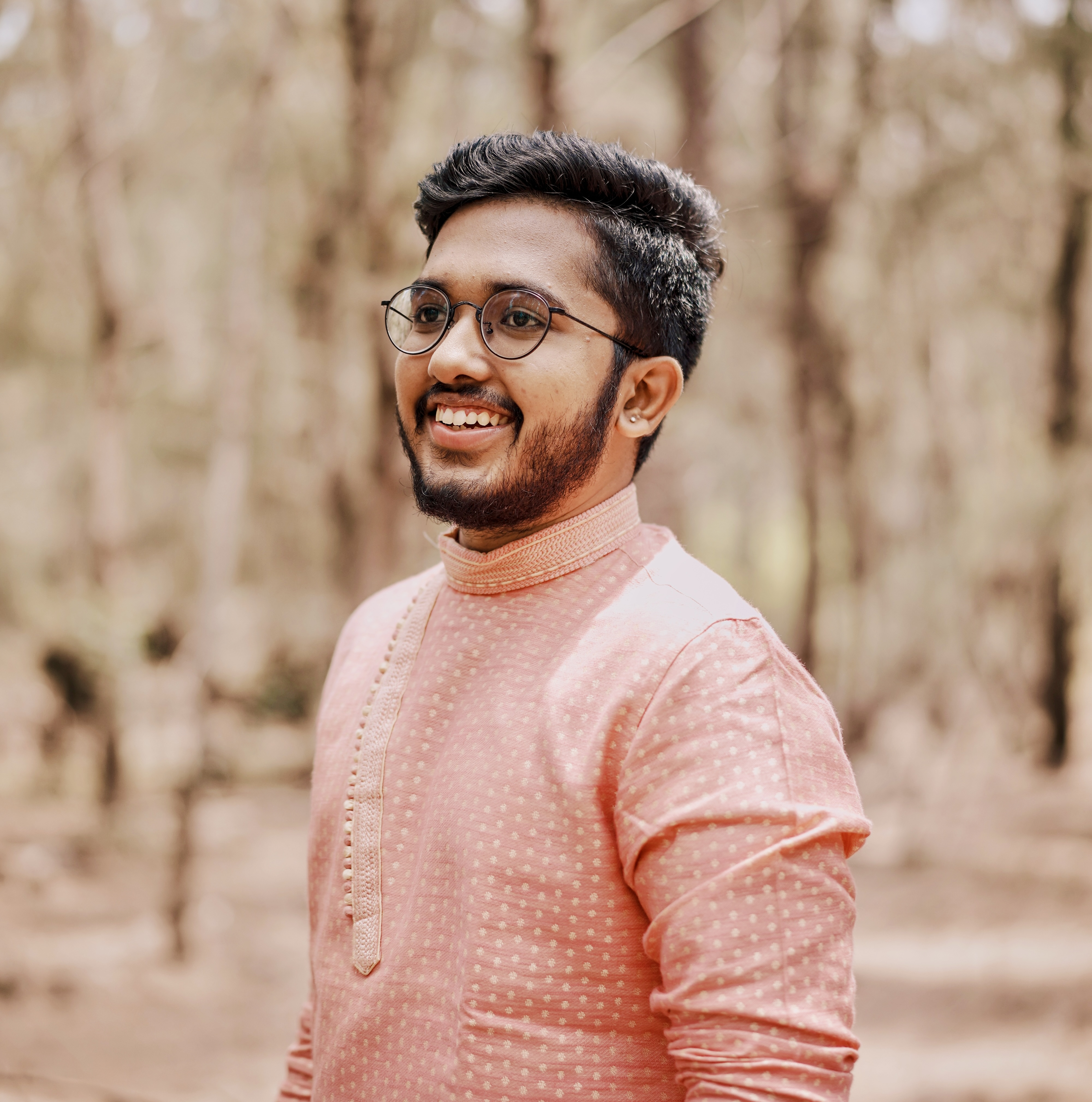

Background information
- Born: Sai Vignesh Ramakrishnan; November 20 1996 (28 years); Chennai, Tamil Nadu, India
- Genre: Various
- Occupation: Singer
- Years active: 2013–present

Sai Vignesh is an Indian singer and Carnatic musician, known for his works in Tamil, Telugu and Kannada films.

Sai Vignesh made his debut in playback singing in 2018 with Eghantham. His songs "Kurumugil" from Sita Ramam and the blockbuster song "Varaha Roopam" from Kantara became hits. He won a Filmfare Award at the 68th_Filmfare_Awards_South for "Varaha Roopam" (Kantara).

== Biography ==
Sai Vignesh is an All India Radio "A" grade artist, is an empaneled artist of ICCR, Government of India. He began singing at a very young age and used to accompany his grandmother V. Vijayalakshmi during her vocal performances. He began music classes from Smt. Kamakshi in the year 2003 and then from Guru Lakshmi Ananthakrishnan for 8 years (2004 to 2011). Since 2011, he has continued training under Cuddalore Sri T.R.Vasudevan (Disciple of Chembai Vaidhyanatha Bhagavathar and Prof. T. R Subramaniam).

Sai Vignesh reached Top 10 position in the singing reality show Airtel Super Singer 4. He was the winner of “Sing with Shankar Mahadevan Contest 2014“ conducted by Shankar Mahadevan Academy and got an opportunity to perform with Shankar Mahadevan at Banglore. He was also the mentor for "Star Singer" (a reality show in Jaya Tv). In 2021, Sai Vignesh co-founded an Indo-Classical Contemporary Fusion band called GANDIVA alongside dancer-choreographer Kavya Muralidaran.

Sai Vignesh made his debut playback with “Oora Nenjila” song for the movie Eghaantham (2018) composed by Ganesh Raghavendra and also was part of “Kaalai Theme” song in 2018 for the movie Kadaikutty Singam composed by D.Imman. In 2022, Sai Vignesh had two successful releasing includes "Kurumugil" from the movie Sita Ramam composed by Vishal Chandrasekar and "Varaha Roopam" from the movie Kantara. He also was part of the chorus in the hit 2022 film Ponniyin Selvan: I. Sai Vignesh made his Telugu playback singing debut in 2022 with "Anuragam Asai" from Daarunam.

Sai Vignesh made his debut as a TedX speaker on September 25, 2026 speaking at the "TEDxVETIAS" event on the topic "Rooted to Rise"

== Playback Songs List ==
Year	Song	Film / Album	Language	Notes
2018	"Oora Nenjila"	Eghaantham	Tamil	
2018	"Kaalai Theme"	Kadaikutty Singam	Tamil	
2022	"Kurumugil"	Sita Ramam	Tamil	
2022	"Rocketry's Shri Venkatesa Suprabatham"	Rocketry: The Nambi Effect	Multilingual	
2022	"Devaralan Aattam"	Ponniyin Selvan: I	Tamil	Backing vocals
2022	"Varaha Roopam"	Kantara	Kannada	Also used in Hindi, Tamil, Telugu, and Malayalam dubbed versions
2022	"Anuragam Asai"	Daarunam	Telugu	
2023	"Nedumudi Yeaganein"	Striker	Tamil	
2023	"Aroro Ariraaro"	Ayothi	Tamil	
2023	"Sollamale Sollamale"	Virupaksha	Tamil	
2023	"Acchacchacho"	Mr. Natwarlal	Kannada	
2023	"Nan Hudugi"	Unlock Raghava	Kannada	
2023	"Nagu Hoove"	Kaiva	Kannada	
2024	"Anbalane Sol"	Lal Salaam	Tamil	Backing vocals
2024	"Punnaaga Poodhota"	Bramayugam	Telugu	
2024	"Ee Maha Lokaana"	Bramayugam	Telugu	
2024	"Sooreede Lekunte"	Bramayugam	Telugu	
2024	"The Beginning"	Bramayugam	Telugu	
2024	"The Age of Madness"	Bramayugam	Telugu	
2024	"Bhoomiya Maalika"	Bramayugam	Kannada	
2024	"Ee Maha Lokadi"	Bramayugam	Kannada	
2024	"Aadityanillade"	Bramayugam	Kannada	
2024	"The Beginning - Kannada"	Bramayugam	Kannada	
2024	"The Age of Madness - Kannada"	Bramayugam	Kannada	
2024	"Neethane Enathu Thozhamai"	Mr. Zoo Keeper	Tamil	
2024	"Kavidhai Kottudhu"	Pon Ondru Kanden	Tamil	
2024	"Whistle Podu"	The GOAT	Tamil	Backing vocals
2024	"Magale"	Haraa	Tamil	
2024	"Raja Lanti Abbaai"	Maharaja	Telugu	
2024	"Nanna Vihara"	Kaalapatthar	Kannada	
2024	"Kadhal Theeradha"	Lara: The Unrevealed Story	Tamil	
2024	"Yevarithanu"	Bhairathi Ranagal	Telugu	
2024	"Kavalane"	Bhairathi Ranagal	Tamil	
2024	"Valayosai"	Valayosai	Tamil	Independent Single
2024	"Mari Antha Kpam"		Telugu	
2025	"Nooru Koti Devaru"	Royal	Kannada	
2025	"Azhagana Nerangal"	Ring Ring	Tamil	
2025	"Thaai Mugam"	Sweetheart!	Tamil	
2025	"Yaar Yaaro"	Trauma	Tamil	
2025	"Oon Uyir"	Chennaiyil Vaanam Megamootathudan Kaanapadum	Tamil	
2025	"Soul of Virat"	Virat	Telugu	
2025	"Pani Kaatrin"	Cold Call	Tamil	
2025	"Kannile Eeram"	Marutham	Tamil	
2026	"Radha Krishna"	Krishnavataram Part 1: The Heart (Hridayam)	Tamil	
2026	"Radha Krishna"	Krishnavataram Part 1: The Heart (Hridayam)	Telugu	
2026	"Baa Karavalige"	Karavali	Kannada	
2026	"The Power of Varahi"	Mahendragiri Varahi	Telugu	
2026	"Pani Kaatrin"	Cold Call	Tamil	
2026	"Sengaathi"	Thekkupatti	Tamil	
2026	"Chalo Padhave"	Vrushakarma	Telugu	

== Awards ==
Playback Singing

Year	Award name	Nominated / Winner	Song Nominated For
2023	Behindwoods Gold Icon	Winner - Best Male Singer of the Year	"Varaha Roopam" Kantara
2023	Mega Wedding Expo Wedding Industry Awards	Winner - Best Entertainer	
2023	Chittara Star Awards	Winner - Best Singer	"Varaha Roopam" Kantara
2023	International Iconic Awards	Winner - Best Playback Singer	"Varaha Roopam" Kantara
2023	Filmfare Awards South	Winner - Best Playback Singer	"Varaha Roopam" Kantara (Kannada)
