= Sshivada =

Indian actress

- Born: Tiruchirappalli, Tamil Nadu, India
- Other names: Sshivada Nair; K.V. Srilekha Nair
- Occupation: Actress
- Years active: 2008–present
- Spouse: Murali Krishnan (m. 2015)
- Children: 1

Sshivada Nair known mononymously as Sshivada, also known as K. V. Srilekha Nair is an Indian actress who appears predominantly in Malayalam and Tamil films. She is a recipient of two South Indian International Movie Awards.

== Personal life ==
Sshivada was born in a Malayali family to Vijayarajan Pillai and Kumari, at Tiruchirappalli, Tamil Nadu and studied till grade 5 in Chennai. After grade 5, her family moved to Angamaly and there she was educated at Viswajyothi CMI Public School, Angamaly. She is a Computer Science engineering graduate from Adi Shankara Institute of Engineering Technology. She is married to her longtime boyfriend Murali Krishnan and has a daughter.

== Career ==
Sshivada started her acting career through a small role in 2009 Malayalam anthology film Kerala Cafe. But she didn't get enough recognition. Later when working as a VJ in television, she was spotted by Malayalam director Fazil, who cast her as a lead in his 2011 film Living Together. Then she auditioned for the Tamil film Nedunchaalai. Though her mother tongue is Malayalam, Sshivada managed to dub for her first film. She says, "I was born in Trichy and studied in Chennai till my fifth standard before moving to Kerala. So, I'm comfortable speaking Tamil." Sshivada received praise for her portrayal of Manga, a Malayalam village girl, who runs a dhaba. While Sify wrote "new find Shivada...steals the show. She lights the screen as she executes the loud, aggressive and righteous Manga with a lot of style and élan", Baradwaj Rangan called her a "terrific newcomer". In her next film Zero, a supernatural thriller directed by debutant Shiv Mohaa, a former assistant of Bharat Bala, she plays Priya, "a modern-day wife, who is also orthodox and holds on to some traditional values". In March 2017, Sshivada signed a new project, to be directed by Ashwin Saravanan and starring along S J Suryah and Wamiqa Gabbi.

== Filmography ==
Key
†	Denotes films that have not yet been released

List of Sshivada film credits
Year	Title	Role	Language	Notes	Ref.
2008	Ninakkayi...	Herself	Malayalam	Album song : Ennakaruppin Ezhazhaku..	
2009	Kerala Cafe	Writer's wife	Malayalam	Segment : Puram Kazhchakal; credited as Sreelekha	
2010	Mazha	Herself	Malayalam	Music album; credited as Sreelekha	
2010	Nilavu	Jyothy	Malayalam	Credited as Sreelekha	
2011	Living Together	Shyama	Malayalam		
2014	Nedunchaalai	Manga	Tamil		
2015	Su.. Su... Sudhi Vathmeekam	Kalyani	Malayalam		
2016	Zero	Priya	Tamil		
2016	IDI - Inspector Dawood Ibrahim	Nitya	Malayalam		
2017	Adhe Kangal	Deepa/ Ashwini/ Priya/ Vasundhara	Tamil	Ananda Vikatan Cinema Award for Best Villain Female; South Indian International Movie Award for Best Actress in a supporting role – Tamil	
2017	Lakshyam	Shalini	Malayalam		
2017	Achayans	Jessica	Malayalam	Asianet Comedy Awards for Most Promising Actress	
2017	Ramante Edanthottam	Voice actor – Female	Malayalam	Dubbed for Actress Anu Sithara, The Female Lead of the Movie	
2018	Shikkari Shambhu	Anitha	Malayalam		
2018	Chanakya Thanthram	Irene	Malayalam		
2019	Lucifer	Sreelekha	Malayalam	Cameo appearance	
2019	My Santa	Isa's mother	Malayalam	Photo appearance	
2021	Maara	Kani	Tamil	Released on Amazon Prime Video	
2021	Sunny	Nimmy	Malayalam	Released on Amazon Prime Video	
2022	Meri Awas Suno	Meryl	Malayalam		
2022	12th Man	Dr. Nayana	Malayalam	Released on Disney+ Hotstar	
2022	Nitham Oru Vaanam	Meenakshi	Tamil		
2023	Vallavanukkum Vallavan	Azhagi	Tamil		
2023	Jawanum Mullapoovum	Jayashree Teacher	Malayalam	Kerala Film Critics Association Award for Best Actress	
2023	2018	Mrs. Shaji Punnoose	Malayalam		
2023	Theera Kaadhal	Vandhana Gautham	Tamil		
2024	Secret Home	Sarika	Malayalam		
2024	Garudan	Tamilselvi	Tamil		
2024	Oru Anweshanathinte Thudakkam	Ruby	Malayalam		
2024	Anand Sreebala	Commissioner Amala Viswanathan IPS	Malayalam		
2024	Manorathangal	Sarala	Malayalam	Anthology series; segment: Silalikhitham Released on ZEE5	
2025	L2: Empuraan	Sreelekha	Malayalam		
2025	Sumathi Valavu	Deepa	Malayalam		
2025	Kayilan	Aathirai	Tamil		
2026	Thadayam	Inspector Lakshmi	Tamil		
2026	Patriot	Uma Michael	Malayalam		
2026	Karuppu	Kanmani	Tamil		
