= Joe (2023 film) =

- Theatrical release poster
- Directed by: Hariharan Ram S.
- Written by: Hariharan Ram S.
- Produced by: Dr. D. Arulanandhu; Mathewo Arulanandhu
- Starring: Rio Raj; Malavika Manoj; Bhavya Trikha
- Cinematography: Rahul KG Vignesh
- Edited by: Varun KG
- Music by: Siddhu Kumar
- Production company: Vision Cinema House
- Distributed by: Sakthi Film Factory
- Release date: 24 November 2023
- Running time: 145 minutes
- Country: India
- Language: Tamil

Joe is a 2023 Indian Tamil-language romantic drama film written and directed by Hariharan Ram S. in his directorial debut. The film stars Rio Raj in the titular role as well as Malavika Manoj and Bhavya Trikha featuring in lead roles, whilst the plot of the film is formed around Joe's emotional journey about love.

The film was released theatrically on 24 November 2023 to positive reviews from critics and completed 50 days at the box office.

== Plot ==
Past (2008): In Rameshwaram, Joe and his friends take part in an inter-school competition at another school. While their friends get ready, Joe arrives late with Ganesh and Santha, angering the dance master, who bars them from entering the school grounds. They sneak in anyway and run into Vinoth, a student from the rival school. A fight breaks out, and Joe slaps Vinoth, who threatens him in return. Later, while searching for Santha, Joe clashes with Vinoth again but manages to escape with Santha and Ganesh.

Present (2019): At his bachelor party, Joe is drinking with his friends when his fiancée, Shruthi, calls to say she wants to cancel the wedding. He keeps drinking through the night, growing nostalgic and remembering events from 2010.

Past (2010): As a first-year engineering student, Joe falls hard for Suchithra after seeing her cry. He uses every trick he can to win her over and eventually succeeds, even protecting her from a senior from Kerala. Although Suchithra returns his feelings, her family disapproves and confronts Joe, leading to a heated argument. During the confrontation, Suchithra misreads the situation and believes Joe has struck her father. She orders him to leave, and a devastated Joe warns that she will regret it. He walks out and turns to alcohol to numb his pain.

Months later, Joe is still heartbroken and has become an alcoholic. When his friends try to comfort him, a Facebook notification on Santha’s phone reveals that Suchithra is engaged to another man. Joe then admits that he and Suchithra were actually married, and he insists that his friends accompany him to Kerala. There, they discover that the family is mourning Suchithra’s death. Her cousins attack Joe, blaming him for her suicide, but Suchithra’s father stops them and reveals that Joe was not responsible. He explains that Suchithra had remained loyal to Joe, yet she could never forget the humiliation of seeing him slap her father.

After the funeral, Joe is consumed by grief and sinks deeper into drinking and violence. He regrets never proving his innocence to Suchithra and, in despair, mixes something into his drink and is hospitalised. When he returns home, his mother scolds him for blindly believing in 'love at first sight' and reminds him of the sacrifices the family has made. Joe finally realises that he must move on, marry, and bring happiness to his parents.

Present (2019): As preparations continue for Joe and Shruthi’s wedding, Shruthi’s father reassures her that Joe is the right man. Shruthi, however, is still angry that Joe went ahead with the marriage after she asked him to cancel it, especially after he tied the thaali around her neck. Before their first night together, Santha admits that he was the one who answered Shruthi’s call to cancel the wedding, which explains her behaviour at the ceremony. Shruthi keeps her distance, and Joe later gets drunk during a routine police stop, forcing Shruthi’s father to bail him out. On the way home, Shruthi’s father offers Joe a job at the college and suggests that the strain between them is affecting the marriage. Back home, Shruthi lashes out at Joe for involving her father, and she becomes frightened when he grabs her while trying to explain himself.

Joe later asks Renu, Shruthi’s sister, whether something is wrong in the marriage. Renu explains that Shruthi was never fully happy about the wedding, but had hoped it would work after the marriage and urges Joe to be patient and supportive. Joe also speaks to Shruthi’s colleagues at the college and learns that she behaves professionally but remains emotionally closed off. After a misunderstanding involving college security, Padma and Shruthi, Shruthi apologises to Padma and reassures her, then later admits privately that she regrets how she has treated Joe. This change of heart comes after Renu tells her that Joe was drunk when she tried to call off the wedding and that Santha answered instead. Joe had wanted to clear this up all along, and Shruthi now feels guilty and wants to apologise.

After the school culturals, Joe looks for Shruthi, who has been called away to settle a dispute between Renu and Shakthi, her ex-boyfriend. Joe sorts out the problem and scolds both Renu and Shakthi. Shruthi apologises for avoiding him and for her rude behaviour, then confesses that there is another man in her life. Joe decides to find that man for her. They return to Joe’s house, where they are welcomed, but Joe leaves for the playground, and Praveen drives Shruthi there. On the way, Shruthi asks about Suchithra, and Praveen tells her that she died by suicide, which badly affected everyone close to her. He says Shruthi’s wish to return to the other man is the right choice.

At the playground, Shruthi wants to speak to Joe, but he has already found the man she was searching for and tells her to go to him. To her shock, the man is Vinoth, the boy she had once liked at school. He had inappropriately touched her during the 2008 inter-school competition, and Joe had protected her. Shruthi then realises that she has spent ten years searching for her rescuer, Joe, without knowing that he was her husband all along. The two are finally reunited, happy to have found one another.

== Cast ==
- Rio Raj as Joe
- Malavika Manoj as Suchitra (Suchi), Joe's deceased girlfriend
- Bhavya Trikha as Shruthi, Joe's wife
- Charle as College Security Guard
- Anbu Thasan as Santha, Joe's friend
- M. J. Shriram as Shruthi's father
- Jayakumar as Suchi's father
- Praveena as Joe's mother
- Elango Kumanan as Joe's father
- Radha Dhandapani as Padma, the college security guard's wife
- Vaishnavi Sundar as Renu, Shruthi's sister
- Aniiruth Kanakarajan as Sakthi, Renu's boyfriend
- VJ Rakesh as Vinoth, Shruti's school crush
- Aegan as Praveen, Joe's friend
- Kevin Felson as Arun, Joe's friend
- VK Vignesh Kanna as Ganesh, Joe's friend
- Kavinn GT as Coach Arya
- Krishneshraja as Police Inspector
- Riswana Begam as Suchi's friend

== Production ==
Hariharan Ram S. made his directorial debut through the film, and cast his friend Rio Raj in the titular role. Production on the film took place throughout 2022 for 37 days, and was completed by January 2023. Scenes were shot in places including Rameswaram, Dhanushkodi, Pollachi, Chennai, and Coimbatore.

== Soundtrack ==
Joe

Soundtrack album by Siddhu Kumar
- Released: 10 November 2023
- Recorded: 2023
- Genre: Feature film soundtrack
- Length: 13:18
- Language: Tamil
- Label: Think Music
- Producer: Siddhu Kumar

Siddhu Kumar chronology
Theera Kaadhal (2023)	Joe (2023)	Rebel (2024)
External audio
- Joe Jukebox on YouTube

The music was composed by Siddhu Kumar.

Track listing
No.	Title	Lyrics	Singer(s)	Length
1.	"Kovai Kulira"	Rio Raj	Vineeth Sreenivasan	1:40
2.	"Urugi Urugi"	Vignesh Ramakrishna	Anand Aravindakshan	3:35
3.	"Urugi Urugi (Reprise)"	Vignesh Ramakrishna	Nalini Vittabane	3:42
4.	"Ore Kanaa"	Vaisagh	Yuvan Shankar Raja	3:15
5.	"Dimmu Dippu"	Kiran Varthan	Anthony Daasan	2:02
6.	"Culturals Song"		Anand Aravindakshan, Siddhu Kumar	2:26
7.	"Joe Teaser Theme"		Anand Aravindakshan	1:33
Total length:				18:13

== Release and reception ==
The film had a theatrical release on 24 November 2023 across Tamil Nadu. A critic from Times of India noted that the film "a decent romance that could have cut deeper" and "for a film involving college life and youth, it is a very mindful film that gets its political messaging right". A reviewer from Cinema Express wrote that "weak writing pulls down this well-executed film" and that "if only the writing was better planned, the film would have been more than just an 'average Joe'". A reviewer from South First wrote that "Hariharan Ram comes up with a satisfying romantic drama".
