= Siddhu Kumar =

Indian music director

- Born: 6 October 1993 (age 32); Chennai, India
- Occupations: Composer, song writer, singer
- Years active: 2012–present

Siddhu Kumar is an Indian music director who works predominantly in Tamil cinema. He made his debut as a music director with Sivappu Manjal Pachai.

== Career ==
In 2019, Siddhu Kumar made his debut with Sivappu Manjal Pachai, which was well-received for its musical arrangements.

In 2021, he worked on an independent project for Think Music India. He composed the track Adipoli and directed the music video. In the same year, he composed another two films: Trip and Anandham Vilayadum Veedu. He also scored for G. V. Prakash Kumar’s Bachelor that year as well, in which he did the background score for the film and composed a song, "Maalai Nera Theneer".

In 2023, he composed music for three films: Kannai Nambathey, Theera Kaadhal, and Joe.

== Filmography ==
Year	Film	Notes
2019	Sivappu Manjal Pachai	
2020	Kadhal Ondru Kanden	Short film
2021	Trip	
2021	Bachelor	1 song
2021	Anandham Vilayadum Veedu	
2023	Kannai Nambathey	
2023	Theera Kaadhal	
2023	Joe	
2024	Rebel	Only additional score
2024	Sir	
2025	Aan Paavam Pollathathu	
2025	Aaromaley	
2026	Good News †	

=== Music video ===
Year	Title	Singer(s)	Notes	Ref.
2021	Adipoli	Vineeth Sreenivasan, Sivaangi K.	Also actor	
