= Ram and Leela =

- Theatrical release poster
- Directed by: Ramachandrran Kannan
- Written by: Ramachandrran Kannan; Aakash Poojith
- Produced by: R. Ravindran; Sudharsan
- Starring: Rio Raj; Vartika Jain
- Cinematography: Mallikarjun
- Edited by: YNC Shiva
- Music by: Ankit Menon
- Production companies: Trident Arts; EYWA Entertainments
- Distributed by: Sri Kumaran Films
- Release date: 21 August 2026
- Running time: 142 minutes
- Country: India
- Language: Tamil

Ram and Leela is a 2026 Indian Tamil-language science fiction romantic comedy film written and directed by Ramachandrran Kannan in his directorial debut, who co-wrote the script with Aakash Poojith and produced by Trident Arts and EYWA Entertainments. The film stars Rio Raj and Vartika Jain. It revolves around Ram who falls in love with Leela but soon uncovers an unusual secret about her.

The film, originally titled Ram in Leela, was announced in December 2025, with filming beginning the same month and ending in March 2026. It was retitled just three days before its release on 21 August 2026. The film was a box office failure.

== Plot ==
Raghuram "Ram" is a 30-year-old middle-class man desperate to get married after facing 50 consecutive matrimonial rejections. His fortunes change when he falls for Leela during a local train journey.

Leela accepts his proposal, but she introduces a strict, non-negotiable condition: he can never see her after 6:00 PM. Ram's relentless attempts to sneak a peek at Leela after dark spark a series of wild misunderstandings involving his traditional family and close friends.

Eventually Ram discovers the truth: Leela's family possesses a mysterious lineage tied to an ancient alien race (the Anunnaki), which triggers a supernatural biological transformation whenever the sun sets, forcing Ram to decide what their relationship truly means.

== Cast ==
- Rio Raj as Raghuram "Ram"
- Vartika Jain as Leela
- Balaji Thiyagarajan Dayalan as Ram
- Chetan as Raghuram's father
- Munishkanth as Raghuram's uncle
- Malavika Avinash as Raghuram's mother
- Deepa Venkat as Leela and Ram's mother
- Ma Ka Pa Anand as Chinnavandu Mama, Leela and Ram's uncle
- Thaafia Abu as Raghuram's sister
- Kavinn GT
- Nayana Elza
- Kushitha Kallapu
- Super Subbarayan
- Swaminathan as Astrologer
- Kathadi Ramamurthy as Leela and Ram's grandfather
- Bujji Babu
- Priyanka Nair as Chinnavandu Mami, Leela and Ram's aunt
- Sudhankumar (DJ Black)
- Vicky Shiva
- Adhes
- Kamala Rajan
- Vijayalakshmi Shankar
- Vetrivel S
- Adhiyaman A
- Kannan E

== Production ==
The film was announced on 1 December 2025 under the title Ram in Leela, and filming began the same day. It is the directorial debut of Ramachandrran Kannan, the first film for Vartika Jain as lead actress, and the debut of cinematographer Mallikarjun and editor YNC Shiva. The first filming schedule was completed by the end of the month, and the second schedule began in January 2026. Filming wrapped in late March.

== Soundtrack ==
The music was composed by Ankit Menon. It is his Tamil debut as he earlier composed for Malayalam films.

Track listing
| No. | Title | Lyrics | Singer(s) | Length |
|---|---|---|---|---|
| 1. | "Yaar Yaarival" | Mohan Rajan (Tamil), Sushant Sudhakaran (Hindi) | Sid Sriram, Sawai Bhatt |
| 2. | "Manjal Aavaro" | Semv.iii | Armaan Malik, Ankit Menon, Semv.iii |
| 3. | "Seppu Sela" | Uma Devi | V. M. Mahalingam |
| 4. | "Gabru Gujili" | Thamizh | Mathichiyam Bala |
| 5. | "Ayali" | Adesh Krishna | Ankit Menon |
| 6. | "Yaar Yaarivan" | Mohan Rajan | iSai |

== Release ==
=== Theatrical ===
Just three days before its release on 21 August 2026, Ram in Leela was retitled Ram and Leela. The change was announced after the film was cleared by the censor board. Journalists believed the title was altered because the original title could carry a "double-meaning" interpretation. The last-minute change attracted attention ahead of the film's release, although the makers did not publicly elaborate on the reason for the alteration. It was distributed by Sri Kumaran Films in Tamil Nadu.

=== Home media ===
The post-theatrical digital streaming rights were acquired by Amazon Prime Video. It began streaming there from 18 September 2026.

== Reception ==
Abhinav Subramanian of The Times of India rated the film 2.5 out of 5, comparing its "gender flip" theme to that of another Tamil film Double Occupancy released earlier the same year, saying "it wasn't a particularly fresh idea even then. Here it is never more than a set-up for the next meltdown". Avinash Ramachandran of Cinema Express wrote that the film had an "interesting idea" and "almost all the required ingredients", but it "neither has its heart in the right place, nor does this experiment yield promising results". Maalai Malar reviewed the film more positively with a 3/5 rating, praising the cast performances, cinematography and screenplay with minimal flaws.
