= 498A: The Wedding Gift =

- Directed by: Suhaib Ilyasi
- Written by: Suhaib Ilyasi
- Starring: Srishti Gautam; Farida Jalal; Supriya Karnik
- Release date: 2012
- Country: India

498A: The Wedding Gift is a 2012 drama film set in New Delhi, India. It is written and directed by Suhaib Ilyasi and depicts the misuse of anti-dowry laws.

== Plot inspiration ==
Producers of 498A: The Wedding Gift maintain that the story of the film is not based on Suhaib Ilyasi's story, but maintain that it was inspired by the death of Syed Makhdoom, a Canadian national and a computer engineer by profession, who ended his life on 5 April 2009 in Bangalore, leaving four suicide notes and a dying video message on his mobile phone.
