= Sir (2024 film) =

2024 Indian Tamil language action drama film

- Theatrical release poster
- சார்
- Directed by: Bose Venkat
- Written by: Bose Venkat; Suguna Diwakar (dialogues)
- Screenplay by: Bose Venkat
- Produced by: S. Siraj; Nilofer Siraj
- Starring: Vimal; Chaya Devi; Siraj S; Saravanan
- Cinematography: Iniyan J. Harish
- Edited by: Sreejith Sarang
- Music by: Siddhu Kumar
- Production company: SSS Pictures
- Distributed by: Grass Root Film Company; Romeo Pictures
- Release date: 18 October 2024
- Running time: 133 Minutes
- Country: India
- Language: Tamil

Sir is an Indian Tamil-language action drama film written and directed by Bose Venkat. The film stars Vimal and Chaya Devi in the lead roles. The film is produced by S Siraj and Nilofer Siraj under SSS Pictures banner and presented by Vetrimaaran under his Grass Root Film Company banner. Siraj S, Saravanan, Rama and V. I. S. Jayapalan appear in supporting roles. The film has music composed by Siddhu Kumar, cinematography handled by Iniyan J Harish and editing by Sreejith Sarang.

Sir was released on 18 October 2024.

== Plot ==
The people of Mangollai village like Colochi Saami and Saamikannu opposed education for the poor while people like Annadurai and Sivangaanam fought against oppression

Annadurai takes over a school started by his father Arasan Vaathiyar. Arasan was a respected teacher and became possessd by the gods turning him into a lunatic hence earning the epithet kirukku Vaathiyar.

After a few years after the passing of Arasan, Annadurai turns the school into a middle school and wishes the school to be turned into a high school one day and is hoping that his son will fulfill the dream.

Now enters Gnanam, the son of Annadurai. He seems to be carefree and does not seem to take the profession seriously much to the annoyance of his father. He eventually falls in love with another teacher Valli.

Annadurai when working on his field one day, suffers an accident and rendering him a lunatic too thus becoming kirukku Vaathiyar jr. Despite all this Gnanam makes huge progress in upgrading the facilities of the school. Suddenly when he is returning home on his schooter he is attacked by BB pellets by unknown assailants. The village seeing Gnanam acting strange causes him to be repulsed by the villagers.

In a shocking twist Valli is kidnapped and the mastermind is revealed to be Shakthi, Gnanam's friend. He is revealed to be the Colochi Saamis grandson. Shakthi attacks the village and frames Annadurai. Causing the police to arrest him and interrogate him in lockdown.

Annadurai passes away due to the trauma causing Gnanam to hack each one of Shakthis friends in their own home.

He finally battles and kills Shakthis community including his uncle thus ending the reign.

== Cast ==
- Vimal as Mangollai Ponnarasan Sivagnanam "Ma. Po. Si"
- Chaya Devi as Valli
- Siraj S
- Saravanan as Ponnarasan
- Rama
- V. I. S. Jayapalan
- Saravana Sakthi
- M Chandrakumar as Annadurai "Mental Vaathiyaar"

== Production ==
=== Development ===
On 26 August 2022, actor-turned-film maker Bose Venkat announced his second directorial venture titled Ma Po Si (acronym also referring to M. P. Sivagnanam) after Kanni Maadam (2020) starring Vimal in the titular role and Chaya Devi Kannan in the lead roles, with Saravanan playing an important role. The announcement was made in Aranthangi in the presence of Tamil Nadu Ministers, Anbil Mahesh Poyyamozhi, V Meyyanathan, MP M. M. Abdulla and MLA T. Ramachandran, due to his political affiliation with DMK.

Siraj S, Saravanan, Rama and V. I. S. Jayapalan where signed to appear in supporting roles. Post-dubbing, the makers announced that director Vetrimaaran would be presenting the film under his Grassroot Film Company. The film has music composed by Siddhu Kumar, cinematography handled by Iniyan J Harish and editing by Sreejith Sarang.

=== Filming ===
Principal photography was planned to be shot entirely in Aranthangi in a single schedule and to wrap within 30–40 days. The shooting was wrapped in late February 2023.

== Music ==
Sir

Soundtrack album by Siddhu Kumar
- Released: 18 September 2024
- Genre: Feature film soundtrack
- Language: Tamil
- Label: SSS Pictures
- Producer: Siddhu Kumar

Siddhu Kumar chronology
Rebel (2023)	Sir (2024)

Singles from Sir
- 1. "Panangarukka" Released: 5 July 2024; 2. "Poovasanai" Released: 26 July 2024; 3. "Padichukurom" Released: 14 September 2024; 4. "Putta Vatcha" Released: 24 September 2024

Audio Jukebox
- SIR - Audio Jukebox on YouTube

The music and background score is composed by Siddhu Kumar. The first single "Panangarukka" was released on 5 July. The second single "Poovasanai" was released on 26 July. The third single "Padichukurom" was released on 14 September. The fourth single "Putta Vatcha" was released on 24 September. Following an audio launch event, the album featuring six songs was released on 18 September 2024.

Track listing
No.	Title	Writer(s)	Singer(s)	Length
1.	"Panangarukka"	Viveka	G. V. Prakash Kumar, Saindhavi	3:39
2.	"Poovasanai"	Viveka	Sean Roldan	2:11
3.	"Padichukurom"	Viveka	Padmapriya Raghavan, Prarthana Sriram	3:25
4.	"Putta Vatcha"	Anthakudi Ilayaraja, Ilankavi Arun	Anthakudi Ilayaraja, Lakshmi	3:47
5.	"Nerinji Mulla"	Viveka	Lakshmikanth M	0:56
6.	"Puriyalaya"	Viveka	Lakshmikanth M	0:56
Total length:				14:54

== Release ==
=== Theatrical ===
Sir released theatrically on 18 October 2024. The film was granted a U/A certificate from the Central Board of Film Certification (CBFC).

=== Home media ===
Sir was premiered on Amazon Prime Video on 6 December 2024.

=== Marketing ===
On 4 April 2024, a first-look poster with an intro-video was released featuring Vimal as a teacher after Vaagai Sooda Vaa (2011) in the village Mangollai, where education is refused by the name of God. The film teaser was released on 19 June 2024 and the trailer got released on 18 September 2024 after a pre-release event in Chennai. Ahead of the film's release, another trailer was released on 17 October, revealing why the teaching profession means a lot to the titular character, Ma. Po Si.

== Reception ==
Abhinav Subramanian of Times of India gave 2.5/5 stars and wrote "Sir is a watchable film with its share of drawbacks, offering a familiar yet mildly engaging take on the power of education in rural India." Kirubhakar Purushothaman of News 18 gave 2/5 stars and wrote "Sir has a noble cause at its core, the execution makes it a yarnfest, and instead of getting the catharsis such social commentary aims to provide, the film invokes a sense of guilt for feeling so."

Sreejith Mullappilly of Cinema Express gave 2/5 stars and wrote "The film explores themes of social inequality and the importance of education, but its violent resolution and simplistic characterisation undermine its potential as a social reform drama." Anusha Sundar of OTT Play gave 1.5/5 stars and wrote "Despite talking about the importance of education, Sir becomes an irresponsible film that forgets what it wants to profess in the chaos of violence."

== Controversies ==
On 14 June 2024, the makers announced on a change of title from Ma Po Si to a new one Sir, after the veteran politician, freedom fighter and poet Mylai Ponnuswamy Sivagnanam aka Ma.Po.Si's granddaughter Parameshwari expressing her concern for using her grandfather's name. In the title-change clarification video released by the director, he expressed the title-change is due to reasons that are all happy ones and not problematic. He further added that, the new title Sir has been made after careful consideration and planning to align with our vision for the project.
