= Velicham TV =

Indian Tamil-language TV channel

Velicham Plus
- Country: India
- Broadcast area: India
- Headquarters: Chennai, Tamil Nadu, India

Programming
- Language: Tamil

Ownership
- Owner: Velicham Tv Network

History
- Launched: 14 April 2016
- Replaced: Velicham Plus
- Former names: Velicham TV

Links
- Website: http://www.velichamtv.org

Velicham TV is a Tamil TV Channel based in Chennai, Tamil Nadu, India. It was launched on 14 April 2016. The Inaugural function was live facilitated Captain TV by DMDK Leader Vijayakanth, MDMK Leader Vaiko, Communist leaders Mutharasan, Ramakrishnan. Later It Was Rebranded As Velicham Plus

== Launch ==
The Channel was launched on 14 April 2016 by Desiya Murpokku Dravida Kazhagam founder Vijayakanth.

== Management ==
Velicham TV is managed by Velicham TV Network Its managing director is Thol. Thirumavalavan The channel is owned by Viduthalai Chiruthaigal Katchi (VCK).
