= Adhe Kangal (2017 film) =

2017 Indian film by Rohin Venkatesan

- Theatrical release poster
- Directed by: Rohin Venkatesan
- Written by: Rohin Venkatesan
- Produced by: C. V. Kumar
- Starring: Kalaiyarasan; Janani; Sshivada
- Cinematography: Ravivarman Neelamegam
- Edited by: Leo John Paul
- Music by: Ghibran
- Production company: Thirukumaran Entertainment
- Release date: 26 January 2017
- Running time: 120 minutes
- Country: India
- Language: Tamil

Adhe Kangal (transl. The Same Eyes) is a 2017 Indian Tamil-language romantic thriller film written and directed by debutant Rohin Venkatesan and produced by C. V. Kumar. The film stars Kalaiyarasan, Janani and Sshivada, with Bala Saravanan in a supporting role. The music was composed by Ghibran with cinematography by Ravivarman Neelamegam and editing by Leo John Paul. The film had a theatrical release on 26 January 2017, coinciding with India's Republic Day. It was remade in Kannada as Samhaara (2018) and in Telugu as Neevevaro (2018).

== Plot ==
Varun is a well-known blind chef and the owner of a popular restaurant in Chennai. One night, Deepa visits his restaurant asking for leftover food for the homeless. Varun helps her and eventually falls in love with her daily visits. Meanwhile, Varun's close relative Sadhana approaches his parents and reveals her intentions of marrying Varun, which they accept. Varun decides to propose to Deepa in his restaurant, but he observes that she is in tears. She tells him that henchmen were pressing for their money and her father had promised to return the money in three days. Varun promises to help out from his own savings. That same night, Varun is met with an accident and is hospitalised, during which his vision is restored. He is treated for three weeks, and the hospital fee is paid out of his savings. Varun feels guilty and is disappointed for not helping out Deepa. When he is discharged, he is unable to locate her. When his family presses him to marry Sadhana, he agrees as he also likes her from his childhood days.

Several days later, an old man walks into the restaurant telling how his daughter Deepa has been kidnapped as they were unable to return the money. Varun calms him down and hatches a plan to hand over his wedding jewellery, but is conned of the jewels by the kidnapper. Later, Varun gets to know that Deepa's father is found dead at Kanyakumari in a road accident. Varun decides to visit Kanyakumari himself to get clarity about Deepa's family. He works with a constable Panju, faking his identity as a journalist investigating the road accidents where the victim remains unidentified. They decide to find the whereabouts of the old man, and they gather several clues on his hotel residence and phone number. These clues lead them to investigate the car that was involved in the accident and track down its owner as a blind man. After listening to his story, they get hold of photos of his girlfriend Vasundhara, and with Sadhana's help, they identify her as Deepa, Varun's ex-girlfriend.

They find out that Vasundhara is a con artist and selects only blind men. She makes the blind men fall for her and then presents a story with a need for money, which the blind men give. Varun and Panju find the commonality and pinpoint a list of potential targets. Sadhana, with the help of her journalist associates, finds out the plan to con another blind man in Erode. They immediately travel to Erode and catch Vasundhara after several plot twists. The movie ends with Panju receiving commemorations from people for his efforts in nabbing Vasundhara.

== Cast ==
- Kalaiyarasan as Varun
- Janani as Sadhana
- Sshivada as Vasundhra alias Deepa and Ashwini
- Bala Saravanan as Panju
- Aravindraj as Ravi
- Linga as Thomas
- Abishek Joseph George as Manoj
- Sanjay Jayaraman as Vikram
- Abdool Lee as Alphonse
- Winner Ramachandran as Inspector Arivazhagan
- Chu Koy Sheng as Rhino
- P. Rajalakshmi as Varun's mother
- K. Gopal as Varun's father
- R. Gowri as Sadhana's mother
- Raja Mani Gopalan as Sadhana's father
- Vaisshnavi Venkatesan as Divya, Thomas' girlfriend
- "Aagaya" Sumathi G. as Customer in Alphonse's store

== Production ==
C. V. Kumar launched a project to be directed by Rohin Venkatesan during late May 2016, with Kalaiyarasan, Janani, and Sshivada selected to portray the leading roles. Kalaiyarasan was revealed to be portraying a blind chef, with the team using the American chef Christine Hà as a character inspiration for his role. The film was shot in Kanyakumari, Erode, and Chennai throughout the middle of 2016. In September 2016, near the end of production, it was revealed that the film would be titled Adhe Kangal, named after the 1967 film.

== Soundtrack ==
Adhe Kangal

Soundtrack album by Ghibran
- Released: 18 January 2017
- Genre: Feature film soundtrack
- Length: 15:03
- Label: Think Music India
- Producer: Ghibran

Ghibran chronology
Hyper (2016)	Adhe Kangal (2017)	Ungarala Rambabu (2017)

The soundtrack was scored by Ghibran. It was released by Think Music India.

Track listing
No.	Title	Lyrics	Singer(s)	Length
1.	"Thandhiraa"	S. N. Anuradha	Rajan Chelliah, Sree Ganesh	3:26
2.	"Ponapokkil"	Parvathy	Namratha S. Aravindan, Anudeep Dev	3:43
3.	"Idho Thaanaagave"	Uma Devi	Yazin Nizar, Clinton Cerejo	3:01
4.	"I Have Nothing"	Addie Nicole	Addie Nicole, Jah Mil	3:38
5.	"Theme Music"	—	—	1:15
Total length:				15:03

== Release ==
Adhe Kangal was released on 26 January 2017, coinciding with India's Republic Day. The film was previously scheduled to release in February 2017, but was brought forward after Si3, which was scheduled for 26 January, was delayed.

=== Critical reception ===
Sify praised the film stating it was "a delicious thriller with a meaty, realistic plot and nicely fleshed out characters and not to forget a smart running time of 120 minutes", adding "the film is engaging mainly due to the characterizations and subtle humor, which provides quality entertainment till the end". While singling out praise for actress Sshivada's performance, Baradwaj Rangan wrote "not as good as it sounds on paper, but not bad either" and stated "here's a great story, but the screenplay isn't tight".

=== Accolades ===
Award	Category	Recipient	Ref.
Ananda Vikatan Cinema Awards 2018	Best Actress in a Negative Role	Sshivada	
7th South Indian International Movie Awards	Best Supporting Actress	Sshivada	
