= Mahendran (actor) =

Indian film actor

- Other names: Master Mahendran, Solar Star Mahendran
- Occupation: Actor
- Years active: 1994-present

Mahendran is an Indian actor, who works predominantly in Tamil and Telugu-language films apart from a few Malayalam films. He started acting at the age of 3 and has appeared in over 100 films in six languages as a child actor, a record in India. He is a recipient of two Tamil Nadu State Film Awards and two Nandi Awards.

In 2013 he played the lead in Vizha, which was his breakthrough as an adult actor.

== Career ==
Mahendran made his debut with K. S. Ravikumar's Nattamai (1994). He twice won the Tamil Nadu State Film Award for Best Child Artist, for Thaikulame Thaikulame (1995) and Kumbakonam Gopalu (1998). He also twice won the Nandi Award for Best Child Actor, for Devi (1999) and Little Hearts (2001).

The actor made his breakthrough as a hero when he starred alongside Malavika Menon in Vizha (2013), directed by Barathi Balakumaran. The film is based on the award-winning short film Uthiri, and portrays the love story of Mahendran's character Sundaram, who plays the thappu instrument at funerals, and Rakkamma (Malavika), an oppari singer. The film opened to positive reviews in December 2013. His first Telugu film, First Love (2014) opposite Amrita Rao released on the same day, with a low key release. His other acting credits include Vindhai (2015), Viraivil Isai (2015), Thittivasal (2017) and Naadodi Kanavu (2018). He played the lead role in Telegu film, Asalu Em Jarigindhante (2020).

He gained renewed prominence when he played a young Bhavani in Lokesh Kanagaraj’s Master (2021). He pushes boundaries and works on films that show him in a different light. He have worked on a love story in Vizha (2013), a comedy drama in Namma Oorukku Ennadhan Achu (2021), and a horror film in Ripupbury (2023). He was seen in the Disney+ Hotstar web series Label (2023). Mahendran plays a gangster in the action thriller, Amigo Garage (2024).

== Filmography ==
=== Child artist ===
List of Mahendran child artist film credits
Year	Film	Role	Language	Notes
1994	Nattamai	Boy at panchayat	Tamil	Uncredited
1995	Pedarayudu	Boy at panchayat	Telugu	
1995	Thaikulame Thaikulame	Pandiyan's biological son and Janaki's adopted son	Tamil	Won—Tamil Nadu State Film Award for Best Child Artist
1995	Muthu	Tribal	Tamil	Uncredited
1996	Mahaprabhu	Young boy in the slum	Tamil	
1996	Parambarai	Young Paramasivan	Tamil	
1996	Coimbatore Mappillai	Sumithra's neighbor	Tamil	
1996	Senathipathi		Tamil	
1997	Vaimaye Vellum	Young Raja	Tamil	
1997	Mappillai Gounder	Young Subramani	Tamil	
1997	Pelli Chesukundam		Telugu	
1997	Aahaa..!	Ajay	Tamil	
1998	Kondattam	Mahendran	Tamil	
1998	Thulli Thirintha Kaalam	Market worker	Tamil	
1998	Kaathala Kaathala	Orphan child	Tamil	
1998	Natpukkaga	Young Chinnaiyya	Tamil	
1998	En Uyir Nee Thaane	Rajasekhar's son	Tamil	
1998	Aahaa..!	Ajay	Telugu	
1998	Kumbakonam Gopalu	L. Krishna/Ramakrishnan/Rajasekhar	Tamil	Won—Tamil Nadu State Film Award for Best Child Artist
1998	Sivappu Nila	Muthu Manikkam	Tamil	
1999	Suriya Paarvai	Vijay	Tamil	
1999	Devi	Young Dantra	Telugu	Won—Nandi Award for Best Child Actor
1999	Padayappa	guest at Anitha's wedding	Tamil	Uncredited
1999	Poomagal Oorvalam	Saravanan	Tamil	
1999	Nee Varuvai Ena		Tamil	
1999	Minsara Kanna	Vetri	Tamil	
1999	Mudhalvan		Tamil	
1999	Thirupathi Ezhumalai Venkatesa	Udayappa	Tamil	
1999	Paattali	Young Shanmugam	Tamil	
2000	Sudhandhiram		Tamil	
2000	Maayi	Young Maiyaandi	Tamil	
2000	Mugavaree	A child on the beach	Tamil	
2001	Nageswari	Nanjappa	Tamil	
2001	Ammayi Kosam	Tea supplier boy	Telugu	
2001	Mohanayanangal	The Young Evil Monk	Malayalam	
2001	Simharasi	Young Narasimharaju	Telugu	
2001	Viswanathan Ramamoorthy	Mahendran	Tamil	
2001	Asokavanam	Rahul	Tamil	
2001	Little Hearts	Deva	Telugu	Won—Nandi Award for Best Child Actor
2002	Nee Sneham	Boy running in background	Telugu	Uncredited
2003	Magic Magic 3D	Indrajeet's friend	Tamil	
2003	Simhadri	Blind Shoeshiner	Telugu	
2003	Aalukkoru Aasai	Saravanan	Tamil	
2006	Nenjirukkum Varai	Murugan	Tamil	

=== Adult actor ===
Key
†	Denotes films that have not yet been released

List of Mahendran adult film credits
Year	Film	Role	Language	Notes
2010	Jaggubhai	Mohan	Tamil	
2010	Mudhal Kadhal Mazhai	Aanjaneyar Kumar	Tamil	
2013	Vizha	Sundaram	Tamil	
2014	First Love		Telugu	
2014	Endrume Anandham	Subbu	Tamil	
2015	Vindhai	Karthi	Tamil	
2015	Viraivil Isai	Susi	Tamil	
2017	Thittivasal	Muthu	Tamil	
2018	Naadodi Kanavu	Marudhu	Tamil	
2020	Asalu Em Jarigindhante	Vasu	Telugu	
2021	Master	Young Bhavani	Tamil	
2021	Chidambaram Railway Gate	Velu	Tamil	
2021	Namma Oorukku Ennadhan Achu	Nalla Thambi	Tamil	
2022	Maaran	Bharath	Tamil	
2023	Ripupbury	Sathyaraj	Tamil	
2023	Kathar Basha Endra Muthuramalingam	Young Kaluvan	Tamil	
2024	Amigo Garage	Rudra	Tamil	
2024	Super Zindagi	Javed	Malayalam	
2025	Karmanye Vadhikaraste	Jai	Telugu	
2025	Unpaarvaiyil	Ajay (Anil)	Tamil	Released on Sun NXT
2026	Nilakanta	Nilakanta	Telugu	
2026	29	Santhosh	Tamil	
2026	Trikala	Shiva	Telugu	
2026	Srinivasa Mangapuram		Telugu	

=== Television ===
List of Mahendran television credits
Year	Series	Role	Notes
1997	Mayavi Marichan	Manikandan	Sun TV
2009	Masthana Masthana	Contestant	Sun TV
2023	Label	Veerasekar	Disney+ Hotstar
