= Azhagae Azhagu =

- Genre: Drama
- Written by: Dialogue: Krish
- Screenplay by: Priya Thambi
- Directed by: Praveen Bennett
- Starring: Nakshatra Nagesh; Anshitha Akbarsha; Prem Jacob; Guna Kumaran
- Theme music composer: Leo Celestine
- Composer: Leo Celestine
- Country of origin: India
- Original language: Tamil
- No. of seasons: 1
- No. of episodes: 200+

Production
- Producer: V. Vaishnavi
- Production location: Tamil Nadu
- Cinematography: Saravanan
- Editor: Vinothkumar
- Camera setup: Multi-Camera
- Running time: Approx. 22–24 minutes per episode
- Production company: Global Villagers

Original release
- Network: Star Vijay
- Release: 26 January 2026 – present

Azhagae Azhagu (transl. Beauty, Oh Beauty) is a 2026 Indian Tamil-language drama television series that airs on Star Vijay starring Nakshatra Nagesh, Anshitha Akbarsha, Prem Jacob and Guna Kumaran.

The show was produced by V. Vaishnavi under the Global Villagers banner. It premiered on Star Vijay on 26 January 2026, and airs from Monday to Friday at 19:30 and streams digitally on JioHotstar.

Directed by Praveen Bennett and written by Krish, Azhagae Azhagu is set in a traditional patriarchal household in Chennai. The story begins when Azhagu Mathi, a fearless and principled young woman, repeatedly clashes with Suresh, a corrupt and abusive police officer who routinely misuses his authority against vulnerable people. As Mathi becomes a part of Suresh's family, the narrative also explores the contrast between Azhagu Mathi and Azhagu Malar, the family's daughter-in-law. Despite their vastly different personalities and life experiences, the two women develop a unique bond of friendship, supporting one another as they navigate the oppression, discrimination, and challenges of living in a deeply patriarchal household.

== Plot ==
Azhagae Azhagu is set in a traditional, patriarchal household in Chennai. The events of Azhagae Azhagu begin when Suresh repeatedly clashes with Azhagu Mathi, a principled and fearless young woman who files multiple complaints against him for being a corrupt and incompetent police officer who abuses his authority to oppress vulnerable people. Their escalating conflict sets the story in motion and ultimately brings Azhagu Mathi into the lives of Suresh's family.

The household is headed by Raghavan, a strict, patriarchal man with deeply conservative views, and his wife, Lakshmi, an overbearing and manipulative woman who harbors prejudice against her daughters-in-law, and frequently creates conflict within the household through her lies and deceit. They have five children: Bagyaraj, Revathi, Suresh, Siddharth, and Shruthi.

The eldest son, Bagyaraj, a bank employee, is married to Azhagu Malar, a house-wife. Together, they have a young daughter. Revathi, also a house-wife, is married to Thangaraj, a rich and influential businessman and loan shark who runs an illegal kangaroo court, using the same to extort money and threaten people. She has two children with him. Thangaraj is an extremely misogynistic, influential and violent man who exercises considerable control over both his own family and his in-laws. He constantly abuses, humiliates and mocks Revathi. Suresh works as a police officer, who got the job through Thangaraj's recommendation, whilst their younger siblings, Siddharth and Shruthi, are preparing for employment.

Years before the events of the series, Bagyaraj and Malar fell in love. However, their relationship was opposed by Bagyaraj's family. At the time, a marriage alliance had already been arranged: Revathi was promised to Thangaraj, while Bagyaraj had been promised to Thangaraj's younger sister. Despite repeatedly telling his parents and Thangaraj that he loved Malar and could not marry someone else, Bagyaraj's wishes were ignored. Unable to accept the forced marriage, Bagyaraj eloped with Malar, and the couple married against the wishes of his family. Devastated by the broken alliance, Thangaraj's younger sister died by suicide. Although Thangaraj still honored his commitment and married Revathi, he never forgave Bagyaraj or Malar, holding them responsible for his sister's death.

From that day onward, Thangaraj became determined to make their lives miserable. He constantly manipulates Raghavan and Lakshmi into believing that Malar is incapable, and responsible for every problem in the family, ensuring that she is blamed, insulted, and humiliated within her own home. Whenever Malar's family visits, Thangaraj and her in-laws verbally abuse and humiliate them, and even beat up Malar's brother for talking with Shruthi. As a result of Thangaraj's influence, Malar remains an outcast despite being the family's daughter-in-law. She is also extremely overworked and burdened with household chores. Bagyaraj rarely defends Malar, despite caring deeply for her due to his submissive nature. His guilt and reluctance to challenge his family leaves a meek and submissive Malar to face the emotional abuse alone.

Bagyaraj bears almost the entire financial burden of the household. In contrast, Suresh contributes little to the family's expenses, despite earning a stable salary as a police officer and supplementing his income through bribes obtained via his corrupt practices. As a result of supporting the household, Bagyaraj is in significant debt, taking out multiple loans and even pawning all of Malar's jewelry to meet the family's financial needs.

Almost all of Raghavan and Lakshmi's children, including Revathi, dislike Thangaraj's domineering behavior and recognize the harm he causes. However, Raghavan, Lakshmi and Suresh idolize him. Grateful that Thangaraj used his influence to secure him a job in the police force, Suresh blindly follows him. Under Thangaraj's guidance, Suresh becomes a corrupt police officer who protects his brother-in-law's illegal kangaroo court and assists him in numerous unlawful and corrupt activities. Revathi frequently stands up for Malar and Bagyaraj and protects them from Thangaraj's ill-treatment despite being a victim of his abuse. However, she keeps his abuse a secret from her family.

Azhagu Mathi is a college professor pursuing a PhD in Computer Science. Intelligent, ambitious, and independent, she has no interest in marriage and is determined to build a successful life for herself and her family. She is a firm believer in gender equality and women's independence.

Suresh and Mathi clash when Suresh threatens her and refuses to take a complaint of domestic violence made by Mathi on behalf of her housemaid, claiming household issues are personal problems and need not be registered formally. Thus, Mathi files formal complaints against him for intimidation, abuse of power, and misconduct. Later, when Thangaraj and Suresh enter Mathi's college and intimidate two students for being in a relationship, Mathi stops them. Suresh abuses his authority by threatening Mathi. Soon afterwards, Suresh and Thangaraj brutally assault the same student. Mathi finds a recording of the incident and uploads the video online. The footage goes viral, exposing Suresh's corruption and police brutality to the public. Suresh is suspended from the police force pending investigation. His public disgrace also causes his arranged marriage to be called off, leaving him and his family deeply humiliated.

The scandal reveals another connection between the two families: Mathi's father, Ram Murthy, is an employee of Thangaraj and is heavily indebted to him, having borrowed ₹30 lakh. Furious that Mathi has destroyed Suresh's reputation and career, Thangaraj summons Ram Murthy. He demands that Ram Murthy either repay the entire ₹30 lakh loan, and quit his job, or agree to marry Mathi to Suresh. He believes that the marriage will restore Suresh's reputation and erase the humiliation caused by his broken engagement.

After her father suffers a heart attack following her refusal to marry Suresh, Mathi is emotionally blackmailed into reconsidering her decision and she reluctantly agrees to marry Suresh. Post-marriage, Mathi is subjected to the same ridicule and hostility that Malar has endured for years. However, unlike Malar, she challenges her in-laws whenever they insult or mistreat her. She stands up for Revathi and Malar as well. Malar often urges Mathi to remain silent, believing that enduring injustice is sometimes necessary to preserve family harmony. Mathi disagrees, and prioritises her self-respect. Despite their different personalities, the Mathi, Malar and Revathy develop a close friendship.

Mathi withdraws the complaints she had filed against Suresh at Malar's insistence, enabling him to regain his position as a police officer. Despite this, Suresh and his family remain ungrateful, blaming Mathi for his suspension in the first place. Having adopted the patriarchal beliefs of both his father, Raghavan, and his brother-in-law, Thangaraj, Suresh expects unquestioning obedience from the women in his family. Mathi, however, refuses to tolerate such attitudes. Mathi and Suresh are unable to connect with each other due to problems created by his mother and Thangaraj.

Meanwhile, Suresh, under Thangaraj's influence, tries force himself on Mathi. When Mathi shares that she wants to get to know him as a person first, they argue and the family gets involved. In anger, he slaps Mathi and to his shock, she slaps him back. Thangaraj, fearing Mathi might go to the police again, gets them to apologise to each other.

Mathi also faces constant opposition because of her independent lifestyle. She continues working after marriage, values her financial independence, and follows habits such as going for morning jogs, which her conservative in-laws consider inappropriate for a married woman in their household. Convinced that Mathi's confidence stems from her employment, and financial independence, Thangaraj uses his influence to have her dismissed from her job. When Mathi finds out about this, she confronts him and vows to secure a better job through her own abilities at an organization where his influence holds no power. Despite their differences, Suresh supports Mathi in her efforts to find a new job. Meanwhile, after Bagyaraj learns that Thangaraj has been abusing Revathi, he takes her back to his house. Thangaraj then manipulates Revathi's family and promises that he will not mistreat her again, eventually persuading them to send her back to him, which Bagyaraj does unwillingly.

When Lakshmi falls ill, her husband taunts and ignores her pain. Mathi cares for her and takes her to the hospital, where she is told has high blood pressure and diabetes. Madhi and Malar encourage her to eat healthier and go for morning walks. This changes Lakshmi’s attitude towards them, and she treats them more kindly. To help improve the eating habits of the family, Malar, Mathi and Revathy decide to call their friend, under the guise of a dietician, to give them dietary advice. However, when they get caught, they are ostracised and humiliated by Bagyaraj, Thangaraj, Suresh and their in-laws.

Meanwhile, Shruthi reveals that she loves Malar’s younger brother, Karthik. Malar opposes their relationship because of the family’s past treatment of Karthik and his mother, leaving Shruthi heartbroken as her family begins looking for alliances. When Shruthi is forced to meet a potential suitor, she runs away and takes shelter at Malar’s house, making her absent when the suitor and his family arrive. When Suresh and Thangaraj learn that Shruthi is at Malar’s house, they go there and beat up her brother and push her mother. Having had enough of her family’s ill-treatment, Malar demands that Suresh and Thangaraj apologise, after proving that she and her family had no role in Shruthi running away or hiding there.

The story continues to follow Mathi and Malar as they navigate the challenges of living in a deeply patriarchal household, supporting one another while confronting the prejudices, conflicts, and injustices that surround them.

== Cast ==
=== Main ===
- Nakshatra Nagesh as Azhagu Mathi
  - Suresh's wife and the family's younger daughter-in-law. A college professor pursuing a Ph.D. in Computer Science, Mathi is intelligent, ambitious, and fiercely independent. A strong advocate for gender equality and justice, she refuses to remain silent in the face of oppression. Her outspoken nature and determination to stand up for herself and others frequently bring her into conflict with her patriarchal husband and in-laws.
- Anshitha Akbarsha as Azhagu Malar
  - Bagyaraj's wife and the family's elder daughter-in-law. A gentle, compassionate, and self-sacrificing housewife, Malar quietly endures years of emotional abuse and humiliation from her in-laws. Despite her suffering, she remains committed to preserving family harmony and gradually gains the confidence to stand up for herself through her close friendship with Mathi.
- Prem Jacob as Suresh
  - Mathi's husband and Bagyaraj's younger brother. A corrupt and incompetent police officer who misuses his authority for personal gain, Suresh is heavily influenced by his brother-in-law Thangaraj and shares many of his patriarchal beliefs. Although capable of change, he repeatedly falls back into his old ways under Thangaraj's influence, leading to constant clashes with Mathi.
- Guna Kumaran as Bagyaraj
  - Malar's husband and Suresh's elder brother. A kind-hearted and responsible bank employee, Bagyaraj is the primary breadwinner of the family and shoulders most of the household's financial responsibilities. Unable to stand up for himself and Malar, he rarely confronts his family, leaving Malar to endure their mistreatment despite deeply caring for her.

=== Supporting ===
- Sunitha Thomas as Revathi: Thangaraj's wife and Bagyaraj's younger sister and Suresh, Surthi and Siddarth's elder sister
- Kurinji Nathan as Thangaraj: Revathi's husband and the family's elder son-in-law.
- Sneha Ravi as Shruthi- Bhagyaraj and Suresh's younger sister.
- Prince Xavier as Siddharth (Sidhu) - Bhagyaraj and Suresh younger brother
- Vincent Roy as Raghavan- Bhagyaraj, Suresh, Revathi, Siddarth and Shruthi's father. Father-in-law of Azhagu Malar and Azhagu Mathi.
- Jayanthi Mala as Rajalakshmi- Bhagyaraj, Suresh, Revathi, Siddarth and Shruthi's mother. Mother-in-law of Azhagumalar and Azhagu Mathi.
- Christopher Annadurai as Rammoorthy- Azhagu Mathi's father.
- Sheela as Kanchana- Azhagu Mathi's mother.
- Deepa Nethiran as- Azhagu Malar's mother.
- Madhan Kumar as Karthick- Azhagu Malar's yonger brother.
- M.A Prieshaa as Elavarasi- Thangaraj and Revathi's daughter.
- Agaramuthalvan as Tharani- Thangaraj and Revathi's Son.
- Baby Harshita as Raghavi- Bhagyaraj and Azhagu Malar's daughter

==== Azhagu Mathi's students ====
- Vanvee as Kavitha
- Shibazz as Shyam

==== Bhagyaraj's Colleagues ====
- Sundar Rajan
- Dinesh Chandra

== Production ==
=== Development ===
The series was announced as a part of Star Vijay's future slate of content in July 2025. Initially produced under the working title Dhana Bhagyam. The show was produced by V. Vaishnavi with the production company Global Villagers. The series is directed by Praveen Bennett, known for his television soap operas such as Raja Rani (2017–2023), Bharathi Kannamma (2019–2023) and Mahanadhi (2023–2026). Cinematography by Saravanan.

The first promo was released under the title Azhagae Azhagu on 26 December 2025.

=== Casting ===
The casting of the series began in July 2025 with Anshitha Akbarsha confirmed as one of the main leads, Azhagumalar, making her comeback to acting in television serials after being best known for her appearance in Chellamma (2022–2024) and Bigg Boss 8 (2024–2025). Initially, actress Dharshna Sripal was chosen and approached to play another female lead, but she denied. Later, Thamizhum Saraswathiyum fame actress Nakshatra Nagesh was ultimately cast as the other main lead, Azhagumathi.

Actor Prem Jacob was cast as the male lead Suresh, marking his return after Nee Naan Kaadhal (2023–2025). Newcomer Guna Kumaran was as a secondary lead role as Bhagyaraj, with his rise to fame coming through his numerous short films & YouTube videos which gained popularity with younger viewers. Actor Kurinji Nathan was cast in a leading negative role.

=== Release ===
The first promo was unveiled on 26 December 2025, which gave a brief insight into both Azhagumalar and Azhagumathi's lives. The second promo was unveiled in January 2026, revealing the upcoming release date: (Monday to Friday at 19:00). However, the series time was postponed, and the series promo was relaunched.

The first episode was aired on 26 January 2026 on Monday to Friday at 19:30, replacing Chinna Marumagal.

=== Crossover ===
The series had a crossover episode with Pandian Stores 2 in April 2026.

== Reception ==
=== TRP Ratings ===
It was the 4th most-watched television program on Star Vijay after its launch three months ago. In March 2026 (week 11), the series was the 10th most watched Tamil-language television series with 5.31 TVR.
