= Sushma Nair =

Indian actress

Sushma Nair is an Indian television actress. She has appeared Indian Tamil-language soap operas and television series including Budget Kudumbam and Nayagi.

== Career ==
Sushma started her acting career as a costume designer on movie sets and started acting when she was made to stand in for an actress who did not show up on the set.

== Filmography ==
Year	Soap Opera	Role	Channel
2017–2018	Sumangali	Charu	Sun TV
2019–2020	Nayagi	Ananya	Sun TV
2020	Thirumagal	Pragathi	Sun TV
2021	Thamizhum Saraswathiyum	Suhasini	Vijay TV
2021–2022	Senthoora Poove	Aishwarya	Vijay TV
2021–2022	Endrendrum Punnagai	Nila	Zee Tamizh
2022–2026	Ilakkiya	Anjali	Sun TV
2024–2025	Budget Kudumbam	Vanmathi	DD Tamil

== Personal life ==
Sushma married Lijo John, a cricket coach, in 2021.
