= Ra. Karthik =

Indian film director and screenwriter

- Born: India
- Occupations: Film director, screenwriter
- Years active: 2022–present

Ra. Karthik is an Indian film director and screenwriter who works primarily in Tamil cinema. His debut film was Nitham Oru Vaanam (2022). He subsequently delivered Made in Korea (2026).

== Career ==
Karthik's directorial debut is the film Nitham Oru Vaanam (2022), which stars Ashok Selvan, Ritu Varma, Aparna Balamurali, and Shivathmika Rajashekar. The project was first announced to the media in January 2017; initially, Dulquer Salmaan was cast in the lead role, but he was later replaced by Ashok. The film received positive reviews from critics.

Karthik subsequently collaborated with Netflix, writing and directing the streaming film Made in Korea (2026). The film stars Priyanka Mohan, Park Hye-Jin, Si-hun Baek, and Rishikanth. Karthik said he was inspired to make the movie after witnessing his wife's love for all things Korean. The legend of an Indian princess who traveled to Korea and married its king served as the inspiration for Karthik as he developed the story for the film Made in Korea. Upon its release on Netflix, the film proved popular with audiences, though it received a mixed response from critics.

While working on Made in Korea, Karthik is also preparing his next project, a film titled King 100 (2026), in collaboration with Nagarjuna. This film marked Karthik's debut in Telugu cinema.

== Personal life ==
Karthik is married. He claimed that his wife loves Korean culture.

== Filmography ==
Year	Title	Credited as		Language	Notes	Ref.
Year	Title	Director	Writer	Language	Notes	Ref.
2022	Nitham Oru Vaanam	Yes	Yes	Tamil		
2026	Made in Korea	Yes	Yes	Tamil, Korean, English		
2026	King 100	Yes	Yes	Telugu		
