= Vizha =

2013 Indian film by Barathi Balakumaran

- Theatrical release poster
- Directed by: Barathi Balakumaran
- Written by: Barathi Balakumaran
- Produced by: Rama Narayanan; Sunir Kheterpal; K.G.Jayavel; Balamurugan
- Starring: Mahendran; Malavika Menon
- Cinematography: U. K. Senthil Kumar
- Edited by: Praveen K. L. N. B. Srikanth
- Music by: James Vasanthan
- Production companies: Sri Thenandal Films; Azure Entertainment; JV Media Dreams
- Release date: 27 December 2013
- Country: India
- Language: Tamil

Vizha (transl. Festival) is a 2013 Tamil-language film directed by Barathi Balakumaran. It stars Mahendran and Malavika Menon. The film, based on the award-winning short film Uthiri, portrays the love story of Sundaram (Mahendran), who plays the thappu instrument at death functions, and Rakkamma (Malavika), an oppari singer. Extensively shot in Madurai and several scenes were shots on Ayyanputhur (A small village near Ordnance Estate, Trichy), Tiruchirappalli district, it has music composed by James Vasanthan, while U. K. Senthilkumar worked as the cinematographer and Praveen K. L.-N. B. Srikanth edited the film. Vizha was produced by Rama Narayanan and Sunir Kheterpal for Sri Thenandal Films, Azure Entertainment and JV Media Dreams. It released on 27 December 2013.

== Cast ==
- Mahendran as Sundaram
- Malavika Menon as Rakkamma
- Yugendran as Manimaaran
- Kalloori Vinoth as Pusa
- Kaali Venkat as Pandidurai
- Kadhal Dhandapani
- Kollangudi Karuppayi
- Theni Murugan
- Pillaiyarpati Jayalakshmi
- Smile Selva

== Soundtrack ==
Vizha

Soundtrack album by James Vasanthan
- Released: 2013
- Genre: Feature film soundtrack

James Vasanthan chronology
Nagaraja Cholan MA, MLA (2013)	Vizha (2013)	Azhagumagan (2013)

The soundtrack was composed by James Vasanthan.

- "Madura Ennum" - Anthakudu ilaiyaraja, Dakshayini
- "Sethu Po" - Gaana Bala, Theodore, Sunandhan
- "Ennacho Edacho" - Lathakrishna
- "Ennatha Solla" - Lathakrishna, D. Sathyaprakash
- "Sollama Kollama" - Raghuram, Lathakrishna
- "Nenjadichu Ninnene" - Lathakrishna
