= Budget Kudumbam =

- Genre: Comedy; Drama
- Screenplay by: V . Padmavathy
- Directed by: S.N. Shakthivel
- Starring: Sushma Sunil Nair; Kurinji Nathan
- Country of origin: India
- Original language: Tamil
- No. of seasons: 1
- No. of episodes: 100+

Production
- Camera setup: Multi-camera
- Production company: Vikatan Televistas

Original release
- Network: DD Tamizh
- Release: 22 January 2024 – 7 March 2025

Budget Kudumbam is a 2024 Indian Tamil-language television series directed by S.N. Shakthivel produced by Vikatan Televistas. The show stars Sushma Sunil Nair and Kurinji Nathan in lead role. The series revolves around a middle-class family of Vanmathi (Sushma Sunil Nair), Chanduru (Kurinji Nathan) and their three children.

It currently airs on DD Tamizh from 21 January 2024 on Monday to Friday at 20:00. This series was launched along with Thayamma Kudumbathaar and Shakthi IPS.

== Cast ==
- Sushma Sunil Nair as Vanmathi
- Kurinji Nathan as Chanduru
- Iswarya Menon as Minimini
- Gayathri Yuvraaj as Kanmanai
- Sharvesh as Kannan

== Production ==
=== Development ===
On 17 November 2023, Actress Sushma Sunil Nair confirmed through a their Instagram page, she will act new serial for DD Tamizh, to be produced by Vikatan Televistas and directed by S.N. Shakthivel. The series tells the importance of middle-class family, and follows a Vanmathi's journey to keep the family. The first promo was released on 16 January 2024.

=== Casting ===
Sushma Sunil Nair who commonly joined with Vikatan's projects such as Nayagi where reprising her role as first female lead. Actor Kurinji Nathan was cast as the male lead as Chanduru.
