= Nalla Perai Vaanga Vendum Pillaigale =

- Directed by: Prasath Ramar
- Written by: Prasath Ramar
- Produced by: Pradeep Kumar
- Starring: Senthur Pandeian; Poornima Ravi; Preethy Karan; Suresh Mathiyalagan
- Cinematography: Udhay Thangavel
- Edited by: Radhakrishnan Dhanapal
- Music by: Pradeep Kumar
- Production company: Poorva Productions
- Distributed by: Uthraa Productions
- Release date: 8 March 2024
- Country: India
- Language: Tamil

Nalla Perai Vaanga Vendum Pillaigale (transl. Kids, you have to get a good name) is a 2024 Indian Tamil-language comedy film written and directed by Prasath Ramar. The film stars Senthur Pandeian, Poornima Ravi, Preethy Karan and Suresh Mathiyalagan in the lead roles. The film was produced by Pradeep Kumar.

== Cast ==
- Senthur Pandeian as Ravichandran
- Poornima Ravi as Sofia Banu
- Preethy Karan as Arasi
- Suresh Mathiyalagan as Gandhi
- Thamilselvi as Sabeena Banu

== Production ==
The film, which commenced production in 2018 and shot over a period of 42 days in Madurai and Mayiladuthurai. The film received an "A" certificate from the Central Board of Film Certification.

== Reception ==
Jayabhuvaneshwari B. of Cinema Express rate 3 out of 5 and noted that "After all, the title itself translates to "seeking a good name," and the film's team are pretty much at the receiving end of one". Manigandan KR of Times Now rated the film 2 1/2 out of 5 and noted that "Director Prasath Ramar seems to have trusted his story, which he believes is in tune with the times we live in, and his dialogues more than anything else to keep audiences hooked. His trust seems to be well placed".

Cinema Vikatan critic wrote that "The film starts and drags straight into the story as a different attempt at the title card. It is special that the screenplay is made in a way that is enjoyable with adult comedy in the course of not thinking about it".
