= Rishikanth =

Indian actor

- Rishikanth as Maruthanayagam in Modha Rathri
- Occupation: Actor
- Years active: 2015–present

Rishikanth Rajendran (born 21 September) is an Indian actor who predominantly works in Tamil cinema. His career began with the YouTube group Temple Monkeys, and he played minor supporting roles in various films and TV series. Modha Rathri (2026) is his first starring film.

His notable works include films such as Sila Nerangalil Sila Manidhargal (2022), Sevappi (2024), Coolie (2025), Made in Korea (2026), Modha Rathri (2026), and Dorothy (2026), as well as the TV series Local Times (2026).

== Career ==
Before entering the film industry, Rishikanth was a member of the YouTube group Temple Monkeys. He claimed that he came to Chennai seeking opportunities after learning that the Tamil film industry was largely based there. He has been in the film industry for many years, consistently playing minor supporting roles in numerous films. He has appeared in the films Sila Nerangalil Sila Manidhargal (2022), Hero (2019), Indian 2 (2024) and Coolie (2025), as well as the streaming series Mathagam (2023). In 2024, he played a significant supporting role in the film Sevappi, starring Poornima Ravi and Shravan Athvethan.

It was not until 2026 that he appeared in Modha Rathri, the first film in which he played the lead role. Upon its release, the film received widespread acclaim from both critics and audiences. Commenting on this, Rishikanth noted that it took him so many years to land a lead role in a film: "But I would say, these [...] years were needed. Every year, when I wouldn't get an opportunity, I would concur that I wasn't ready yet, so I would analyse on how to get ready to grow." That same year, he also appeared in the Netflix original film Made in Korea and the Amazon Prime Video original series Local Times. Subsequently, he starred in the film Dorothy, directed by Karthik Subbaraj, which was also released in 2026.

== Personal life ==
Rishikanth drew comparisons to Rajinikanth due to the resemblance in both his appearance and his name. He explained that "Rishikanth" was the name given to him by his parents—not a stage name—and he was unsure if they had been influenced by Rajinikanth, adding, "Back in the '90s, names ending with '-kanth' were famous, so that might have been the reason."

== Filmography ==
=== Film ===
Year	Title	Role	Notes	Ref.
2015	Bench Talkies	The wounded man	Segment: "Puzhu"	
2018	Irumbu Thirai	Kesavan		
2019	K-13	Opposite flat tenant		
2019	Magamuni	Gothandapani's friend		
2019	Hero	Sekhar		
2021	Rocky	Udhai		
2022	Sila Nerangalil Sila Manidhargal	Murali		
2022	O2	Rafiq		
2023	Pallu Padama Paathuka	Bruno		
2023	Neymar	Venkat	Malayalam film	
2024	Sevappi	Karnan		
2024	Rasavathi			
2024	Indian 2	Harish		
2025	Niram Marum Ulagil	Kannan		
2025	Coolie	Rishi		
2026	Couple Friendly	Karthik	Telugu film	
2026	Made in Korea	Mani		
2026	Modha Rathri	Maruthanayagam		
2026	Dorothy	Karthi		
TBA	Indian 3: War Mode	Harish		

=== Television ===
Year	Title	Role	Platform	Notes	Ref.
2020	Locked	Sagar	Aha	7 episodes	
2021	Kalyanam to Kadhal	Rishi	YouTube	Web series	
2023	Mathagam	Nathan	Disney+ Hotstar	7 episodes	
2026	Local Times	Veera	Amazon Prime Video	7 episodes	

=== Short films ===
Year	Title	Role	Ref.
2020	Ponnira Malai		
2020	Modi & A Beer		
2022	Couple Friendly		
2022	Nenjam Nenjam		
2023	Marakkave Ninaikiren		
2023	Oodal		
2024	Paathi Nee Paathi Naan		
