= Ripupbury =

2023 Indian film by Arun Karthick

- Theatrical release poster
- Directed by: Na. Arun Karthik
- Written by: Na. Arun Karthik
- Produced by: Na. Arun Karthik
- Starring: Mahendran; Arati Podi; Noble K James; Kaavya Arivumani
- Cinematography: Thalapathy Ratinam
- Edited by: Muganvel
- Music by: Diwacara Thiyagarajan
- Production company: AK The Talesman
- Release date: 14 April 2023
- Country: India
- Language: Tamil

Ripupbury is a 2023 Indian Tamil-language horror comedy film written, directed and produced by Na. Arun Karthik. The film stars Mahendran, Arati Podi, Noble K James and Kaavya Arivumani in the lead roles with Maari, Srrini, Dhanam and Chella portraying supporting roles.

The film was released on 14 April 2023, coinciding with Tamil New Year.

== Premise ==
Sathyaraj, a YouTuber, falls in love with another caste girl, Kayal. Sathyaraj learns that there is a ghost who kills the intercaste married couple. To unite with his love, he needs to fight against the caste-obsessed ghost. He uses a monkey doll named Rosy to find the ghost. That monkey doll has been possessed by the soul of a police dog named Tiger. The doll will make noise by beating the drum when it finds a ghost. Will Sathyaraj and his friends sort this out and have Sathyaraj marry his lover? That is the rest of the story.

== Cast ==
- Mahendran as Sathyaraj a.k.a. Raj
- Arati Podi as Kayal a.k.a. Goldfish (Thangameen)
- Noble K James
- Kaavya Arivumani as Bharathi
- Maari
- Srrini
- Dhanam
- Chella

== Production ==
The film was produced, directed, and written by Arun Karthick. The film's cinematography is by Thalapathy Ratinam, and the editing was by Muganvel.

== Music ==
The music of the film was composed by Diwacara Thiyagarajan. All songs lyrics were written by Na. Arun Karthik.

Track listing
No.	Title	Lyrics	Singer(s)	Length
1.	"Thangameeney"	Na. Arun Karthik	Kapil Kapilan	3:53
2.	"Aaku Paaku"	Na. Arun Karthik	Akshita Merlyn	1:58
3.	"Nallathaane"	Na. Arun Karthik	Anthony Daasan	2:25
4.	"Kutty Poona"	Na. Arun Karthik	Kapil Kapilan	2:08
Total length:				10:24

== Release ==
=== Theatrical ===
The film was released on 14 April 2023.

== Reception ==
Logesh Balachandran critic of The Times of India rated the film two-and-a-half out of five stars and wrote that "The main issue with Ripupbury is its inconsistent writing. The film’s lack of focus makes it difficult to define and understand." Prashanth Vallavan of Cinema Express rated the film one-and-a-half out of five stars and wrote that "With an unnecessarily complicated story, unfocused writing, and jarring tonal shifts, Ripupbury is a film that is as confused with itself as we are by the end".

Kalyani Pandiyan S of Hindustan Times tamil gave the film a mixed review. A critic from Dina Thanthi wrote that Director Arun Karthik, who has made the entire film with the aim of making people laugh, is also in it. A critic from Maalai Malar rated the film three out of five stars and appreciated the film. A critic from Hindu Tamil Thisai gave the film a mixed review. A critic from Ananda Vikatan gave the film a mixed review.
