= Made in Korea (film) =

2026 Indian film by Ra. Karthik

- Release poster
- Directed by: Ra. Karthik
- Written by: Ra. Karthik
- Produced by: Sreenidhi Sagar
- Starring: Priyanka Mohan; Park Hye-Jin; Si-hun Baek; Rishikanth
- Cinematography: Prasanna Kumar
- Edited by: Anthony
- Music by: Songs: Hesham Abdul Wahab; Simon K. King; Dharan Kumar; Score: Dharan Kumar
- Production company: Rise East Entertainment
- Distributed by: Netflix
- Release date: 12 March 2026
- Running time: 113 minutes
- Country: India
- Languages: Tamil; Korean; English

Made in Korea is a 2026 Indian coming-of-age comedy drama film written and directed by Ra. Karthik. Produced by Sreenidhi Sagar under the banner of Rise East Entertainment, it stars Priyanka Mohan, Park Hye-jin, and Si-hun Baek, and Rishikanth. The film, primarily in Tamil, contains significant dialogue in Korean due to its setting in South Korea.

The film was officially announced in October 2025. It has music and background score composed by Hesham Abdul Wahab, Dharan Kumar and Simon K. King, cinematography handled by Prasanna Kumar, and editing by Anthony. Made in Korea was released directly on Netflix on 12 March 2026.

== Plot ==
Shenbagam "Shenba" is a young woman from Kolappalur, Tamil Nadu. Ever since she dressed up as Shenbavalam, a Korean queen believed to have originated from India, she has been dreaming to go to South Korea. She is dating Mani, her longtime boyfriend, who is hesitant to speak to her parents about their marriage because of his family debt and his occupation as a bartender. Shenba's parents run a small restaurant, and she has studied hotel management, as her father wants her to take over the business once he retires. Mani and Shenba's father have a verbal altercation about his occupation and Shenba takes Mani's side. Mani asks if she can join him without questioning where they are headed to. Shenba agrees and they move to Chennai.

Sometime later, Mani tells Shenba they will be moving to South Korea as she had dreamed. She is given an offer letter to work in a hotel, and Mani would look for a job once he is there. Shenba is elated, though hesitant to leave the country without her parents knowing. On the day of the trip, she travels alone to the airport, with Mani assuring over phone he is on the way. In the flight, she calls her mother to say goodbye. Her mother reprimands her for mistreating her father, which she does not understand. Shenba deduces what had happened: her father had visited them to give them money, claiming it to be her loan disbursed by the bank, but it was actually his savings. Mani received it and told him Shenba did not want to talk to him. Behind her back, he planned a trip to Mumbai to start a business with a friend while stealing the money to also settle his debt.

Shenba reaches Seoul, South Korea. She tries to help a woman being mistreated by her boyfriend and ends up in jail for slapping him. Heo Jun-jae, a vlogger bails her out because he had captured the video of her attempting to save the woman. He reveals the offer letter is a scam, helps her find lodging and a job as a caretaker for a wealthy man's bedridden mother Yeon-ok. She diligently takes care of Yeon-ok but is astonished to find she is not paralyzed. Yeon-ok tells her that she ran a restaurant with her husband, and after her husband died, their son just wanted to take care of the children. She faked illness to get away with it. Shenba proposes to run a restaurant called "Granny's Kitchen" with her and they are successful. She also helps her friends to form a band, even giving them her savings to film a music video.

Shenba eventually gets caught by her employer who assumes she is embezzling money. Yeon-ok explains it is her earnings and confronts her son but collapses. While Yeon-ok is hospitalised, Shenba bids her a tearful farewell through a voicemail and abruptly returns to Kolappalur after hearing news of a landslide there. She reunites with her family after finding them safe; Mani had helped them reach a relief camp during the landslide. Mani apologizes to Shenba and says he tried to contact her several times to return the money, and she thanks him. Shenba is surprised by her friends from Seoul. Her father also gives her his blessings and is happy at the fact that all her friends travelled so far to meet her.

Shenba returns to Seoul and finds that Yeon-ok's house has been vacated. Jun-jae reveals that Yeon-ok had died but left Shenba a voicemail that she was happy in her last moments, thanks to her. Initially saddened, Shenba is uplifted by the voicemail and reopens Granny's Kitchen in Yeon-ok's memory.

== Cast ==
- Priyanka Mohan (Note: Kim Min-ha voices for Shenbagam in the Korean dub.) as Shenbagam "Shenba"
  - Riya Manoj as young Shenbagam
- Park Hye-jin as Yeon-ok
- Si-hun Baek as Heo Jun-jae
- Rishikanth as Mani
  - Videsh Anand as young Mani
- Jae-hyeon Jang as the drummer
- Kim So-ri as Hansol, the woman whose boyfriend gets slapped by Shenba for mistreating her
- Ha-Ram Jo as a guitarist
- Rok Kim as a guitarist
- Min-Seok Jung as Hong Soo-hwan
- Thirunavukkarasu as Shenbagam's father
- Jenson Dhivakar as Saamy
- Jaya as Shenbagam's mother
- Sabharish Ramachandran as Shenbagam's prospective groom
- Sebastin

== Production ==
The film was officially commissioned by Netflix in October 2025, with Ra. Karthik serving as writer and director, while Rise East Entertainment managed the production. Karthik said he was inspired to make the film because of his fascination with "the deep cultural connections and historical similarities between Korean and Tamil heritage". Principal photography took place in South Korea for one-and-a-half months.

== Music ==
The music for Made in Korea was composed by Hesham Abdul Wahab, Dharan Kumar and Simon K. King. The audio rights were acquired by Netflix Music. The soundtrack album was released on 5 March 2026.

Track listing
No.	Title	Lyrics	Music	Singer(s)	Length
1.	"Sodhappuna Singari"	Ramya RamC, Vishnu Edavan	Hesham Abdul Wahab	Ramya RamC	3:09
2.	"Gwenchana"	Vignesh Ramakrishna	Hesham Abdul Wahab	Sheezy, Alexandra Joy	1:46
3.	"Aaralya"	Vignesh Ramakrishna	Hesham Abdul Wahab	Hesham Abdul Wahab, Sanjana Kalmanje	3:25
4.	"We Keep Rockin'"	FRIDAYYY	Hesham Abdul Wahab	Lipsika Bhashyam, Aoora, mimidolly	3:28
5.	"Aagasame"	Vishnu Edavan	Hesham Abdul Wahab	Hesham Abdul Wahab	3:30
6.	"Saalaiyodu"	Vignesh Ramakrishna	Dharan Kumar	Aishwarya Kumar	2:18
7.	"Everything Gonna Be Alright"	Mani Romeo	Simon K. King	Shilvi Sharon	4:39
Total length:					22:15

== Release ==
The film was released directly on Netflix on 12 March 2026.

== Reception ==
On the review aggregator website Rotten Tomatoes, 31% of 13 critics' reviews are positive, with an average rating of 4.9/10.

Yashaswini Sri of The Indian Express gave 3/5 stars and wrote, "Overall, Made in Korea is a warm, well-intentioned film with a premise that genuinely deserved to be explored. But it keeps its emotional ambitions at a safe distance from anything that might truly challenge its characters or its audience. You leave it feeling pleasant rather than moved, entertained rather than affected. For a film that begins with the image of a girl climbing an elephant for a signal, that is a little disappointing. The dream was bigger than this". Chandu Shanigarapu of Hindustan Times rated the film 3.5/5 stars, praising the cast performances and production values, but felt the screenplay in the latter half was slow paced.

S. Poorvaja of The Hindu wrote, "Made In Korea has its heart in the right place and the premise feels fitting; it is the execution that falters". Vishal Menon of The Hollywood Reporter India wrote, "the usually charming Priyanka Mohan struggles to make us feel anything more than indifference and we sit through the film with the distant coldness of getting lost in a foreign country. Cultural appropriation seldom feels as inappropriate as it does in Made In Korea". Sreeju Sudhakaran of Rediff.com wrote, "Made in Korea had the potential to be a culturally rich coming-of-age story but settles for a generic template with an underdeveloped location setting".
