= Amigo Garage =

- Theatrical release poster
- Directed by: Prasanth Nagarajan
- Written by: Prasanth Nagarajan
- Produced by: Murali Srinivasan
- Starring: Mahendran; Deepa Balu; G. M. Sundar; Athira Raj
- Cinematography: Vijayakumar Solaimuthu
- Edited by: Ruben; C S Premkumar
- Music by: Balamurali Balu
- Production companies: People Production House; N V Creations
- Distributed by: Action Reaction
- Release date: 15 March 2024
- Country: India
- Language: Tamil

Amigo Garage (transl. Friend garage (Note: Amigo is Spanish for friend.)) is a 2024 Indian Tamil-language action thriller film written and directed by Prasanth Nagarajan. The film stars Mahendran, Deepa Balu, G. M. Sundar and Athira Raj in the lead roles. The film was produced by Murali Srinivasan under the banner of People Production House and N V Creations.

== Cast ==
- Mahendran as Rudra
- Deepa Balu as Ramya
- G. M. Sundar as Anand
- Athira Raj as Tamil
- Dasarathi Narasimhan as Guru
- Darling Madhan as Bucket

== Production ==
The film shooting was started in August 2021. The film was shot across Hosur and Chennai.

== Soundtrack ==
The music was composed by Balamurali Balu.

- "Kaar Irul" - G. V. Prakash Kumar, Sivaangi

== Reception ==
Roopa Radhakrishnan of The Times of India rated the film 2 1/2 out of 5 and stated that "All the moments in Amigo Garage work better in retrospect". A critic from Times Now gave the same rating and wrote that "Credit has to be given to the director for being very clear with the tone and intent of his story". A critic from The New Indian Express wrote that "Amigo Garage has sparks of potential, but somewhere in this story of a man who turns into a gangster, it gets derailed and doesn’t create an impact with the audience".
