= Dorothy (film) =

2026 Indian film by Karthik Subbaraj

- Theatrical release poster
- Directed by: Karthik Subbaraj
- Screenplay by: Karthik Subbaraj
- Story by: Karthik Subbaraj; Saravanan Chandran
- Produced by: Guneet Monga Kapoor; Achin Jain; Jyoti Deshpande
- Starring: Sananth; Rishikanth; Keerthy Suresh
- Cinematography: Tirru
- Edited by: Ganesh Siva
- Music by: Ilaiyaraaja
- Production companies: Sikhya Entertainment; Dhammam Films; Jio Studios
- Distributed by: Sakthi Film Factory
- Release dates: 11 September 2026 (TIFF); 25 September 2026 (India)
- Running time: 146–150 minutes (Note: The version screened at the 2026 Toronto International Film Festival was 150 minutes, but the theatrical cut is 146 minutes.)
- Country: India
- Language: Tamil
- Box office: ₹15.88 crore net (India)

Dorothy (Note: The correct Tamil pronunciation of the name is [ɖoːɾat̪i] per the film's official Tamil spelling; however the title character herself pronounces it [ɖoroːt̪i].) is a 2026 Indian Tamil-language romantic drama film written and directed by Karthik Subbaraj and produced by Guneet Monga Kapoor, Achin Jain and Jyoti Deshpande. The film stars Sananth, Rishikanth, and Keerthy Suresh (as the title character) in the lead roles. It follows two inseparable friends (Sananth and Rishikanth) whose lives are transformed by the arrival of the title character (Keerthy).

The film was announced in November 2025. Principal photography began the same month in Madurai and continued till March 2026. The film has music composed by Ilaiyaraaja, cinematography by Tirru and editing by Ganesh Siva.

Dorothy had its world premiere at the 2026 Toronto International Film Festival on 11 September, and had its theatrical release two weeks later on 25 September. The film received widespread critical acclaim for its bold storytelling, performances and music by Ilaiyaraaja, though its LGBTQ content sparked controversy.

== Plot ==
The movie is a non-linear narrative presented as an alternating series of black-and-white and color scenes.

The black-and-white scenes talk about Karthi calling "Whistle" Veeraiya over phone and telling him he killed Subbu. Veeraiya's sons meet up with Karthi, and burn Subbu's dead body. Karthi gets in an accident and is saved by a transgender person.

The color scenes take us to the 1980s, Karthi and Subbu become childhood friends after Subbu stands up for Karthi when school bullies attack him. Subbu is a feisty, aggressive child, while Karthi is gentle, dislikes fighting and fears blood. Subbu introduces Karthi to Subbu's family, including his father, "Whistle" Veeraiya— a ruthless moneylender and cinema owner, and Velu and Kalai— Subbu's two elder brothers.

Karthi and Subbu grow up as henchmen under Veeraiya. As young adults, Subbu has become more docile, gentle, avoiding conflicts, and afraid of violence, while Karthi is ruthless, ruffian-like, and not afraid of using force, even standing up for Subbu at times. Despite their closeness, Veeraiya looks down on Karthi for being of a lower caste. Karthi briefly courts Thangamalar, a higher-caste friend from school, until they are caught by Veeraiya, who arranges her marriage to someone of her own caste, much to Karthi's chagrin. One day, Subbu's second elder brother Kalai brings home a wife, Dorothy. Karthi and Subbu are fascinated by her presence in the all-male household, with Subbu developing a fondness for her. Subbu becomes close with Dorothy, spending excessive time cleaning, cooking, having conversations and doing chores together. This is found with much disdain by Whistle Veeraiya, who sends Subbu to live with Karthi for a few days to separate them from Dorothy.

Dorothy is found dead one day, hanging in the family barn. The police deem it to be suicide, despite Subbu pointing out that Veeraiya and Kalai having bloody scratches on them. Subbu and Karthi are devastated; while they are mourning, they are approached by a transgender woman. Subbu and Karthi attack her after she mocks them, and the woman curses them to a lifetime of pain. Subbu goes despairingly to his friend Dhanalakshmi's house and weeps in her arms. Vaseegaran, her elder brother, sees this from the outside of the house; believing that someone was being inappropriate with his sister but not knowing who, he beats Dhanalakshmi up after Subbu leaves. The next day, Subbu approaches Dhanalakshmi's brother in a field and tries to explain, but Vaseegaran is too furious to listen to him and attacks him. Karthi finds them fighting in the field and after a long fight, Karthi stabs the brother to death. Karthi is moved to North India by Veeraiah as an appreciative gesture for saving Subbu, to escape the authorities under the care of Vadivu.

As days pass by, a lonely Subbu grows depressed with Karthi absent and Dorothy dead. On Diwali night of 1995, an enraged Subbu locks himself in Dorothy's room; to his father's and brothers' horror, he shaves his beard and drapes himself in a sari, revealing to the family that he identifies as a woman. She escapes from the house, taking refuge in Dindigul bus station. Flashbacks show Subbu revealing to Dorothy that she had realised her identity as a woman when she was 16, and Dorothy encouraging Subbu come to terms with her gender identity, giving Subbu saris to try on, dancing with her, putting women's makeup on her, and promising Subbu that she would accompany her to a temple up in North India in December where Subbu would undergo a ceremony to transform into a complete woman.

Subbu's brothers and father hire Karthi to kill Subbu to save the family honor and keep Subbu's identity reveal a secret. Karthi finds Subbu at Dindigul. Subbu believes that Karthi has come to take Subbu with him to North India and is happy to travel with him. Karthi is disgusted with Subbu's identity as a woman, but hiding his intentions to kill her, he takes Subbu along with him. Karthi attempts in many opportunities to kill Subbu behind her back, but is either thwarted, or he cannot bring himself to. During one of the attempts, he gets stung by a scorpion and becomes unconscious. Subbu rushes him to a hospital and saves his life. When he wakes up, he sees a dead body with long hair beside him on a hospital bed resembling Subbu. He believes it to be Subbu but it is revealed to be a beggar with nobody to claim his body. When Karthi realises that Subbu saved his life, his heart is softened and he starts being kinder to Subbu, smiling and conversing with her like they used to.

At a lorry stop, Karthi encounters the transgender woman he attacked earlier. The woman and her friends attack Karthi but are stopped by Subbu. The trans woman welcomes Subbu into her group and lifts the curse on Karthi. They plan to meet halfway to the temple to pick-up Subbu. While waiting for them at the agreed location, Karthi reveals that Whistle Veeraiya had hired him to kill Subbu, but that he could never bring his heart to kill Subbu as she is his best friend. Subbu reveals to Karthi about how she had wanted to open up to him first, and had tried multiple times to, but was never able to do so because of Karthi's chauvinistic and patriarchal mindset. She says her identity as Subbu was vastly so Karthi would stay by him. Karthi, moved by Subbu's confession, accepts Subbu as a woman and lets her go alive. He gives her the money he had leftover from Veeraiya, as well as Dhanalakshmi's bangles, which the latter had entrusted him with to help rescue Subbu. Karthi picks up the corpse of the beggar from the hospital as a decoy for Subbu.

The color and the black-and-white tracks merge. Karthi convinces Whistle Veeraiah and Subbu's brothers of having killed Subbu. They cremate the beggar's corpse without realising the truth and are convinced that Subbu is dead.

A month passes by, and it is the day before the December ceremony. Karthi is clouded by Subbu's last conversation with him, and reminisces the days where he drove her to the temple. He realises how much pain and struggle Subbu had undergone all these years in hiding her true identity for Karthi's sake, and how he had loved Subbu in his own way. With Vadivu's advice and encouragement, he realises that his anger over Subbu coming out as a woman was just him fighting against his own feelings. He realises that Subbu as a man was never real, and was a facade to her identity as a woman underneath. He realises that he is in love with Subbu as a woman in his own way and travels to the temple where Subbu is undergoing the gender transformation ceremony, now a woman with a new name: Dorothy. A smiling Dorothy, now fully adorned in a sari, jewels, and as a complete woman, sees him and runs to him. Karthi takes hold of her, and they unite with a kiss.

== Cast ==
- Sananth as Subbu / Dorothy, Karthi's childhood friend and later Karthi's love interest
  - Varun as young Subbu
- Rishikanth as Karthi, Subbu's childhood friend and later Subbu's (Dorothy's) love interest
  - Thihaan as young Karthi
- Keerthy Suresh as Dorothy, Kalai's wife and Subbu's sister-in-law who guides Subbu through her transformation
- Ramachandran Durairaj as Vadivu Annan, Karthi and Subbu's godfather
- Soundararaja as Kalai, Dorothy's husband, Subbu's elder brother, and Velu's younger brother
- Muthazhagi as Thangamalar, Karthi's love interest
- Jeeva Subramanian as the transgender woman who aids Subbu's transformation process
- Muthukumar as Whistle Veeraiya, Velu, Kalai, and Subbu's father and Dorothy's father-in-law
- Gajaraj as the parotta master
- Muthupandi as Velu, Subbu and Kalai's elder brother
- Harishankar Narayanan as Daka Sait
- Rajeshwari as Karthi's mother (she says Subbu to address her as mother and has motherly affection towards him)
- Merlin as Dhanalakshmi, Karthi and Subbu's childhood friend who knows Subbu's secret
- Vijaya Muthu as the head constable
- Sathya Prema as the doctor
- Anthony Daasan as a singer in the song "Kalyana Virundhu" (special appearance)

== Production ==
In May 2025, while promoting Retro (2025), director Karthik Subbaraj noted that after Jigarthanda DoubleX (2023), he had wanted to make a small-budget film intended for film festivals a year before its theatrical release and even developed a complete script but had to stall work to focus on Retro, adding that in contrast to Retro, he intended to feature less prominent actors in this film. On 10 November, Karthik formally announced the film, his 10th directorial venture, to be produced by Guneet Monga Kapoor's Sikhya Entertainment. The untitled film began production the same day at Madurai.

In late March 2026, Karthik said filming was completed and the film was in post-production. Monga Kapoor echoed these comments at the 2026 Cannes Film Festival. The film's title Dorothy was announced on 4 August 2026, along with the lead cast: Keerthy Suresh, Sananth and Rishikanth. Also produced by Dhammam Films and Jio Studios, it was photographed by Tirru and edited by Ganesh Siva. Saravanan Chandran was credited as the additional storywriter while Achin Jain and Jyoti Deshpande also produced the film. Keerthy stated that the title character, despite having screentime amounting to less than half an hour, was important to the story for reasons beyond duration. Karthik said he was inspired by the films of Mahendran, Balu Mahendra, Bharathiraja and K. Balachander while making Dorothy.

== Music ==
The music was composed by Ilaiyaraaja, in his first collaboration with Karthik. An album for the background score, consisting of 18 tracks, was released on 5 September 2026. A 40-minute concert where the tracks were performed live was held the same day at Image Auditorium, Chennai. The soundtrack album was released on 9 October, two weeks after the film's release.

== Release ==
Dorothy had its world premiere on 11 September 2026 at the 2026 Toronto International Film Festival (TIFF) where it received a standing ovation, and had its theatrical release two weeks later, on 25 September. In late August, the Tamil Film Producers Council (TFPC) and the Tamil Film Active Producers Association (TFAPA), due to a dispute with film distributors and exhibitors, announced that Tamil films cannot release or complete filming or post-production works from 1 September 2026 onwards, so the film's theatrical release was facing uncertainty. However, a week later, the decision was reversed, allowing Dorothy to release as planned. The film was distributed by Sakthi Film Factory in Tamil Nadu. It began streaming on Netflix from 23 October 2026. The film was re-released in a limited number of Chennai theatres on 13 November 2026 to mark 50 days since its theatrical release.

== Reception ==
=== Critical response ===
On the review aggregator website Rotten Tomatoes, 88% of 16 critics' reviews are positive, with an average rating of 7.5/10.

Reviewing the film after its premiere at TIFF, Christopher Cross of Asynchronous Media wrote that it "impresses stylistically, having built such a sturdy foundation with its two protagonists that even its awkward handling of a meaningful conversation can still be salvaged in the end." After its theatrical release, Gopi Selva of Tamil Guardian gave the film 4.5/5 stars and wrote, "Dorothy is bold, it is brilliant and it is both [Karthik] Subbaraj's most grounded and daring work." Nandini Ramnath of Scroll.in wrote, "What can safely be said is that except for avoidable bloat and some overwrought patches of scripting, Dorothy is a terrific subversion of the conventional Tamil film romance." Anupama Chopra praised the cast performances, music and technical craft but felt the "sharp narrative turns" and "central twist" of the film which she called "inorganic", prevent "every idea from landing." Prathyush Parasuraman of The Hollywood Reporter India wrote, "Reckless, messy, turgidly long, and forcefully stylish—those long takes, those abrupt cuts, those saturated yellows—these films never achieved their stated purpose, to feel the morality, unable to rise to the provocation of their form. Dorothy is a welcome departure from that disappointment. The form is solidly present, flipping between a flashback in colour and a present in black and white—a reversal, where usually the past is rendered in monochrome nostalgia."

M. Suganth of The Times of India gave the film 4/5 stars and wrote, "Karthik Subbaraj deserves credit for resisting the safer route and following the story through to its logical, uncompromising conclusion." Avinash Ramachandran of Cinema Express gave the film 4/5 stars and wrote, "It isn't a story that hasn't been told on the big screen. It isn't emotions that haven't already been explored. And yet, it is a unique film because Karthik Subbaraj gives a very 'arthouse' concept a 'masala' treatment." Lisa Laman of Looper, meanwhile, declared that Dorothy was one of the ten most underrated movies of 2026, hailing "[Karthik] Subbaraj's precise visual scheme (particularly in one unforgettable sequence rendered in an unblinking single take)...a supporting turn from Jeeva Subramania...legendary composer Ilaiyaraaja [lending] Dorothy stirring orchestral tracks" as some of the greatest artistic achievements in the title.

=== Box office ===
Dorothy earned ₹6.15 crore (US$660,000) worldwide in the first five days of release. Despite widespread sceptism over the film's commercial viability due to the limited screentime of its title character, the film had a successful run at the box office, completing 25 days. By the end of October, it made ₹15.88 crore (US$1.7 million) in net collections in India, and trade analyst Sreedhar Pillai noted that it was already profitable from its theatrical release.

== Festival screenings ==
Festival	Section	Screening Dates	Notes	Ref.
Toronto International Film Festival	Centrepiece	11–12 & 20 September 2026	World premiere	
International Film Festival Rotterdam	Limelight	2027		

== Controversies ==
=== LGBTQ representation ===
After its theatrical release, Dorothy faced backlash for its LGBTQ content, and there were calls to boycott the film. A scene featuring a kiss between a transgender woman and a cisgender male was leaked online post-release, only adding to the controversy. Sakthi Film Factory defended the film and Karthik, accusing audiences of criticising the film without watching it but relying on fake reviews, while Karthik explained that the film was actually about accepting LGBTQ people rather than shaming them. He believed the controversy only "helped" the film. The transgender community has shown support for the film.

=== Plagiarism allegations ===
J. Mohammed Sariff, a short film director, filed a complaint with the Commissioner of Chennai Police, accusing Karthik of plagiarising his 2020 short film Dot Nangai due to transgender friendship and marriage being a common theme. Sariff noted that he had been working for a few months to adapt Dot Nangai into a feature film but the release of Dorothy impeded his progress, and demanded compensation from Karthik.
