= Niram Marum Ulagil =

2025 Tamil film by Britto JB

- Theatrical release poster
- Directed by: Britto JB
- Written by: Britto JB
- Starring: Bharathiraja; Natty Subramaniam; Rio Raj; Sandy; Yogi Babu
- Cinematography: Mallika Arjun; Manikanda Raja
- Edited by: Tamil Arasan
- Music by: Dev Prakash Regan
- Production companies: Signature Productionz; Gs cinemas international
- Release date: 7 March 2025
- Running time: 146 minutes
- Country: India
- Language: Tamil

Niram Marum Ulagil (transl. In a world of changing colors) is a 2025 Indian Tamil-language action drama film written and directed by Britto JB in his directorial debut, starring Bharathiraja, Natty Subramaniam, Rio Raj and Sandy in the lead roles and produced by Signature Productionz and GS Cinema International.

Niram Marum Ulagil was released in theatres on 7 March 2025.

== Plot ==
A narrator shares four tales of extreme parental sacrifice, exploring familial bonds through illness, estrangement, unexpected connections, and emotional turmoil.

== Cast ==
- Bharathiraja as Rayappan
- Natty Subramaniam as Abdul Malik
- Rio Raj as Athiyan
- Sandy as Anbu
- Yogi Babu as Na. Muthukumar
- RJ Vigneshkanth as Bala
- Rishikanth as Kannan
- Aegan
- Kaniha as Fathima
- Vadivukkarasi as Kuzhandhai
- Viji Chandrasekhar as Viji
- Aadukalam Naren as Das
- Mime Gopi as Magimai
- Vinod Sagar as Kandhan
- Tulasi as Annakili
- Nivas Adithan as Rayappan's elder son
- Aadhira Pandilakshmi as Parimalam
- Ayra Krishnan as Mahi
- Lizzie Antony as Mahi's mother
- Aruldoss as Minister Sendhoora Pandian
- Suresh Chakravarthy
- Suresh Menon as Lal Bhai
- Namo Narayana as Mahi's father
- Kaavya Arivumani as Malar
- Sheela Rajkumar as Subiksha
- Jeeva Subramanian as Jeeva
- Balaji Thiyagaraajan Dayalan as Durai
- Vijith as Ram
- Salma Arun as Eeswari
- Lovelyn Chandrasekhar as Abi
- Lenin as Baskar

== Production ==
=== Development ===
On 20 April 2024, Pa. Ranjith released the title-reveal first-look poster of the upcoming film titled Niram Marum Ulagil starring Bharathiraja, Rio Raj, Natty Subramaniam and Sandy Master in the lead roles. The film is written and directed by Britto JB in his debut and produced by Signature Productionz and GS Cinema International and the technical team consists of Dev Prakash Regan as the music composer, Mallika Arjun and Manikanda Raja as cinematographers, and Tamil Arasan as the editor. The film features an ensemble cast including Yogi Babu, RJ Vigneshkanth, Rishikanth, Aegan, Kaniha, Vadivukkarasi, Aadukalam Naren, Mime Gopi, Suresh Chakravarthy, Suresh Menon, Namo Narayana, Kaavya Arivumani and others in supporting roles.

=== Filming and post-production ===
Principal photography took place in different places such as Chennai, Velankanni, Tiruttani and on a set erected like Mumbai. The production house announced that the entire filming process got wrapped on 20 January 2025 and was currently in the post-production stage.

== Music ==
Niram Marum Ulagil

Soundtrack album by Dev Prakash Regan
- Genre: Feature film soundtrack
- Language: Tamil
- Producer: Dev Prakash Regan

Singles from Niram Marum Ulagil
- 1. "Rangamma" Released: 14 February 2025; 2. "Poi Vaadi" Released: 27 February 2025; 3. "Aazhi" Released: 6 March 2025

The soundtrack and background is scored by Dev Prakash Regan. The first single "Rangamma" released on 14 February 2025. The second single "Poi Vaadi" released on 27 February 2025. The third single "Aazhi" released on 6 March 2025.

Track listing
No.	Title	Lyrics	Singer(s)	Length
1.	"Rangamma"	A.S Dawood	Arivu, Dev Prakash Regan	3:10
2.	"Poi Vaadi"	A.S Dawood	Ananthu	3:50
3.	"Aazhi"	Acksharah Balakrishnan	Shakthisree Gopalan, Dev Prakash Regan

== Release ==
Niram Marum Ulagil was released in theatres on 7 March 2025.

== Reception ==
A critic of Dinamalar gave 2.75/5 stars. Abhinav Subramanian of The Times of India gave 2/5 stars and wrote "Mother knows best, but Niram Marum Ulagil knows loudest—crafting four stories so emotionally overwrought they might as well come with complimentary handkerchiefs. [...] With its talented ensemble cast, Niram... had all the ingredients for a moving anthology. A more nuanced approach might have delivered the emotional punch the film so earnestly wants us to feel." Narayani M of Cinema Express gave 2/5 stars and wrote "Behind all the sepia-toned and blue-tinted tales of love and loss, remains an anthology that is strangely devoid of any real thematic colour. And in its absence, Niram Marum Ulagil refuses to bring about any transformation—either on screen or within the audience. "
