= Kaavya Arivumani =

Indian actress

- Born: 02/04/1998; Ambur, Tamil Nadu, India
- Occupation: Actress
- Years active: 2019–present

Kaavya Arivumani professionally known as Kaavya is an Indian actress who works in Tamil language television and films. She is well known for her role as Mullai in the soap opera Pandian Stores which air on Star Vijay. She also acted in the film Miral (2022) which marked her debut into cinema.

== Career ==
In 2019, Kaavya started her career in Bharathi Kannamma serial as Kaavyaa, Soundarya's niece. One year later, Kaavya had replaced Mullai in Serial Pandian Stores (replacement of V. J. Chitra after her demise in December 2020). Kaavya had started her first innings with film with Bharath movie named Miral (2022) produced by Axess film factory. Kaavya got an opportunity working with director Arun Karthik in the movie Ripubury (2023).

== Filmography ==
Year	Film	Role
2022	Miral	Hema
2023	Ripupbury	Bharathi
2025	Niram Marum Ulagil	Malar
2026	Hi :)	Mythili

== Serial ==
List of performances and appearances on television
Year	Serial	Characters	Note
2019–2020	Bharathi Kannamma	Kaavya	
2020–2022	Pandian Stores	Mullai	Replacement of V. J. Chitra
2021–2022	Baakiyalakshmi	Mullai	Special appearance
2021	Thamizhum Saraswathiyum	Mullai	Special appearance
