= Trauma (2025 film) =

2025 Tamil film by Thambithurai Mariyappan

- Theatrical release poster
- Directed by: Thambithurai Mariyappan
- Written by: Thambithurai Mariyappan
- Produced by: S Uma Maheshwari
- Starring: Vivek Prasanna; Prathosh; Chandini Tamilarasan; Poornima Ravi; Ananth Nag
- Cinematography: Ajith Srinivasan
- Edited by: Mugan Vel
- Music by: RS Rajprathap
- Production company: Turm Production
- Release date: 21 March 2025
- Country: India
- Language: Tamil

Trauma is a 2025 Indian Tamil-language crime thriller film written and directed by Thambithurai Mariyappan. The film stars Vivek Prasanna, Prathosh and Poornima Ravi in the lead roles. The film is produced by S Uma Maheshwari under the banner of Turm Production House.

== Plot ==
Selvi is focused on settling her financial affairs before getting married, but her parents are looking for a suitable suitor for her. Jeeva loves Selvi, but she does not reciprocate. Selvi, who works at a petrol pump, wants to get her father Murugesan, an auto driver, a new car. Once, when Selvi receives the daily collection money from the petrol pump manager and goes to give it to her owner, he attempts to mistreat her while intoxicated, but Jeeva jumps to save her. After having a change of heart, Selvi now returns Jeeva's affection. They soon become intimate, and Selvi becomes pregnant. Selvi tries to contact Jeeva, but he does not answer. Selvi soon shocks her mother Parvathy by telling her she is pregnant, but Murugesan is unaware. Selvi declines Parvathy's request to abort her unborn child.

Sundar and Geetha are a couple trying to have a child. Although they are pursuing various treatments, Sundar is the real cause of their childlessness. Sundar's friend Raghu counsels him to be honest because she longs to have a child of her own. Even though Sundar provides Geetha with excellent care, he conceals his incapacity to avoid upsetting her belief that they are unable to conceive. Sundar starts receiving natural medicine at the BCC clinic without her awareness. He starts taking the medication and delivers it to Geetha without telling her. The drugs work quickly, and Geetha becomes pregnant. Soon after, Geetha gets a menacing call demanding a ransom of Rs. 50 lakhs for her private tapes that question the baby's biological father. Geetha is astonished to hear that she became pregnant only after receiving therapy for her husband's prolonged impotence. Sundar and Raghu run to the hospital, thinking they might have revealed the truth about Sundar's treatment, but they find it in a dilapidated state.

Ramesh and Mani, two dimwitted petty thieves, team up to steal the car for a bigger profit than small crimes on the advice of Suresh, the car mechanic. They break into a Ford car, but Suresh gives only Rs. 50,000, so they decide to steal a more expensive vehicle. After several failures, the pair finds and steals a Benz. They are apprehended by the police while hurrying, and they discover Jeeva's body in the car's trunk. Inspector Ajay Kumar captures the pair, but they manage to get away. Ajay is under pressure to apprehend the two thieves as quickly as possible, as the news of Jeeva's body in the car becomes public.

It is now revealed that the money-hungry head doctor who owns the BCC Clinic sends Jeeva, his goon, to impregnate the wives of the male patients who are impotent. Additionally, the drugs render them unconscious. Natraj, another henchman, records Jeeva raping the patients' spouses so that they may use it to threaten and demand ransom. Since Jeeva had not returned her call, Selvi pursues him when she discovers him on the road. Selvi realizes that Jeeva was responsible for the heinous act of impregnating women and demanding ransom. Jeeva argues that he committed the crimes for financial gain and that he truly loved her. When Selvi pushes him away from her, he trips, falls, hits his head, and instantly dies. To dispose of Jeeva's body, the doctor's goons load it into the Benz car's trunk, which Ramesh and Mani later take. After discovering that Jeeva had cheated on her daughter, Murugesan begs Selvi to have her child aborted, which Selvi reluctantly agrees to since she does not want to have a child with a sinner like Jeeva.

At present, Geetha agrees to pay the Rs. 50 lakh ransom in exchange for her private videos. Ajay begins an investigation at the local bar to track down Jeeva's inebriated father Ganesan, but Ramesh and Mani, who are there, are apprehended by the police. On the road, Ramesh and Mani spot the head doctor, who is pursuing Geetha, and the cops now pursue the doctor. The doctor and his goons take Geetha, Sundar, and Raghu hostage after Geetha gives up the money. In a surprising turn of events, it is revealed that Raghu is the driving force behind Sundar's treatment at BCC Clinic. Raghu reveals that to extract money from Sundar, he exploited his impotence. Geetha goes home when Raghu demands another 50 lakhs from her, but Ajay stops her. She tells him what transpired. Raghu and his goons engage in combat with the police. However, Geetha has an abortion after slipping and falling while leaving the location.

At the hospital, Sundar regrets not telling Geetha about his inability, lamenting that her dream has been dashed and he cannot grant her request because of his impotence. Ajay tells Sundar that a man should be a responsible husband and father, not merely someone who gets women pregnant. Finally, Geetha and Sundar adopt a child from an orphanage.

== Cast ==
- Vivek Prasanna as Sundar
- Chandini Tamilarasan as Geetha
- Prathosh as Jeeva
- Poornima Ravi as Selvi
- Ananth Nag as Raghu
- G. Marimuthu as Murugesan, Selvi's father
- Rama as Parvathy, Selvi's mother
- Pazhanisamy
- Namo Narayana as Petrol Pump Owner
- Nizhalgal Ravi as Chief Minister
- Saivam Ravi as Opposition Party Leader
- Sanjeev as Inspector Ajay Kumar
- Vaiyapuri as Constable Ramanathan
- Gayatri Rema as Raghu's wife
- Pradeep K Vijayan as BCC Clinic Chief Doctor
- Dilipan as Drunkard
- Madhan Gopal as Ramesh, pickpocket
- Selva
- Aruvi Bala as Bala, Jeeva's friend
- Agathiyan
- Sakthivel Adhi Meena as Sub-Inspector Sudhakar
- R. Darshan as Kumar, an auto driver (uncredited)

== Production ==
The film is written and directed by debutant director Thambithurai Mariyappan, while the cinematography is handled by Ajith Srinivasan, editing by Mugan Vel, and RS Rajprathap serving as the music composer.

== Music ==
Trauma

Soundtrack album by RS Rajprathap
- Genre: Feature film soundtrack
- Language: Tamil
- Label: Saregama
- Producer: RS Rajprathap

Singles from Trauma
- 1. "Trauma Varalaama" Released: 11 January 2025; 2. "Thaalilo" Released: 24 January 2025; 3. "Oru Paarva" Released: 12 February 2025; 4. "Yaar Yaaro" Released: 12 March 2025

The music is composed by RS Rajprathap. The first single "Trauma Varalaama" was released on 11 January 2025. The second single "Thaalilo" released on 24 January 2025. The third single "Oru Paarva" released on 12 February 2025. The fourth single "Yaar Yaaro" released on 12 March 2025.

Track listing
No.	Title	Lyrics	Singer(s)	Length
1.	"Trauma Varalaama"	RS Rajprathap	Guru Ayyadurai, Shruthi S, RS Rajprathap	3:08
2.	"Thaalilo"	Magesh Balakrishnan	K. S. Chithra, RS Rajprathap	4:12
3.	"Oru Paarva"	Magesh Balakrishnan	Naresh Iyer, Pooja Vaidyanath	3:33
4.	"Yaar Yaaro"	Arun Bharathi	Aparna Narayanan, Sai Vignesh	2:33

== Reception ==
Abhinav Subramanian of The Times of India gave 2/5 stars and wrote "The central scheme, involving fertility clinics and couples taking questionable medications, prompts several questions. No explanation is offered for how victims fail to question medication that renders them repeatedly unconscious, how assault goes undetected, or how blackmailers escape immediate police involvement. [...] It's the kind of movie where you see the pieces, but the picture never quite clicks." Kirubhakar Purushothaman of News18 gave 2/5 stars and wrote "It is tempting to praise Trauma as it projects itself as a film with a noble cause — advocating child adoption. However, that seems to be just a means to an end.[...] It is easy to say that Trauma is living up to its name, which would even make for a good headline for the review." Akshay Kumar of Cinema Express gave 1/5 stars and wrote "Ultimately, Trauma suffers from a lack of coherence, weak character arcs, and misplaced narrative devices. Thambidurai Mariyappan's attempt to bind these narratives results in a disjointed film that lacks emotional depth and fails to leave a lasting impact."
