= Lakshmi Stores =

2018 Indian TV series

- Title in Tamil
- Genre: Soap opera Drama; Romance
- Story by: Sundar C; Raj Prabu; S.Bala Murugan; Nandhan Sridharan (Dialogues)
- Directed by: A Jawahar (Episode1-45); Sundar K. Vijayan (Episode 46-234); K.Sulaiman Babu (Episode 235–322)
- Creative director: Kushboo Sundar
- Starring: Khusbhu Sundar; Nakshatra Nagesh; Hussain Ahmed Khan
- Theme music composer: C.Sathya
- Composers: G.Clement & Joe
- Country of origin: India
- Original languages: Tamil; Telugu
- No. of seasons: 1
- No. of episodes: 335

Production
- Producer: Kushboo Sundar
- Cinematography: T. Sekhar Ram
- Editor: Sutheef S
- Running time: 21–24 minutes
- Production companies: Avni Telemedia; Sun Entertainment

Original release
- Network: Sun TV; Gemini TV
- Release: 24 December 2018 – 25 January 2020

Lakshmi Stores is an Indian Tamil-language soap opera directed by K.Sulaiman, written by veteran director Sundar C and produced by Avni Telemedia which premiered on Sun TV on 24 December 2018 and ended on 25 January 2020. It starred film actresses Kushboo Sundar, Nakshatra Nagesh and Hussain Ahmed Khan.

== Synopsis ==
The story of "Lakshmi Stores" revolves around the lives of the Mahalingam family and their traditional textiles showroom. Mahalingam is the patriarch of the family and the founder of the store. However, he carries a heavy burden of guilt from a secret in his past that weighs heavily on him.

Mahalakshmi, his daughter-in-law, is the backbone of the family and the store. She selflessly nurtures the family and the staff, but her life takes a turn for the worse when she seeks justice for Bhagyalakshmi, a young woman with a heart of gold. This earns her the wrath of the vengeful Minister Shakunthala Devi, as well as the disownment of her husband Tiger Devaraj.

As Mahalakshmi tries to save Lakshmi Stores and reunite with her family, fate takes a sharp turn when Bhagyalakshmi secretly marries Ravi under unavoidable circumstances. This leads to a series of problems with Shakuntala Devi and her family, putting Mahalakshmi, Ravi, and Bhagyalakshmi in a tough spot.

The story also follows the journey of Ravi and Bhagyalakshmi as they face their challenges with the help of Mahalakshmi and come to terms with their differences to reconcile and live happily. In the end, everything falls into place, and the family reunites, and Lakshmi Stores is saved from the clutches of evil forces.

== Cast ==
=== Main cast ===
- Kushboo Sundar as Mahalakshmi Devaraj, Eldest daughter-in-law of Mahalingam and wife of Devaraj
- Nakshatra Nagesh as Bhagyalakshmi Ravi, a worker in Lakshmi Stores and Ravi's wife, Youngest daughter-in-law of Mahalakshmi's family
- Hussain Ahmed Khan as Raviprakash Mahalingam, Younger brother-in-law of Mahalakshmi and husband of Bhagyalakshmi

=== Recurring cast ===
- Sudha Chandran as Minister Shakunthala Devi, Mahalakshmi's arch-rival (Died in serial)
- Suresh as Adv. Devaraj alias 'Tiger' Devaraj, Mahalakshmi's husband and Ravi's eldest brother
- Sruti Patil as Tejaswini "Teja" (Shakuntala Devi's daughter)
- Rekha Krishnappa as Chamundeshwari Varadhan (Shakuntala Devi's half-sister)
- Swathi Thara as Dr. Uma Saravanan (Saravanan's wife)
- Tanisha Kuppanda as Mallikadevi "Mallika" Senthil (Senthil's wife)
- Delhi Kumar as Thillainathan, also known as Thillai (Bhagyalakshmi, Vanitha and Senthil's grandfather and co-owner of Lakshmi Stores)
- Nanditha Jennifer / Sherin Janu as Kamala Mahalingam (Ravi's younger sister)
- Murali Mohan as Mahalingam, owner of Lakshmi Stores and Devaraj, Saravanan, Arjun, Ravi and Kamala's father
- Nisha Yazhini as Vanitha (Bhagyalakshmi's younger sister)
- Delhi Ganesh as Rajendran (Mahalingam's Closest Friend)
- Samson T Wilson as Dr. Saravanan Mahalingam (Ravi's second elder brother)
- Saakshi Siva as Raju (Shakuntala Devi's half-brother)
- Aravind Khathare as Senthilnathan "Senthil" Thillainathan (Bhagyalakshmi and Vanitha's elder brother, Thillainathan's grandson)
- Deepa Shankar as Ponnamma (Maid in Ravi's house)
- Giridharan as Arjun (Ravi's third elder brother)
- Anjali Rao as Raja Rajeshwari, also called Raji (a worker who was a best friend for Bhagyalakshmi and Mahalakshmi).
- Sandeep as Kandhaswamy
- Fouziee as Dhivya (Mallika's sister)
- Diya Palakkal as Priya (Devaraj and Shyamala's daughter)
- Pari as Meenu (Senthil and Mallika's daughter)
- Feroz Khan as Ganeshan
- Bayilvan Ranganathan as Dayalan (Shakuntala Devi's P.A.)
- Monkey Ravi as Uthaman (Shakuntala Devi's PA and Ponnamma's Ex-Fiancé)
- Vichu Vishwanath as Varadarajan also called Varadan (Chamundeshwari's husband)
- Abitha as Dr. Shyamala (first wife of Devaraj and Priya's biological mother)
- Nisha as Maragatham
- Smaleen Monica as Latha Saravanan
- Vinay UJ as Rajkumar (Shakunthala Devi's son)
- Saleema as Janaki Amma
- K. S. G. Venkatesh as Uma's father
- Dhakshayini as Uma's mother
- Nithya Ram as DC Nithya (Mahalakshmi's cousin sister)
- Shyam Ji as Shyam (Ravi's friend and Vanitha's love interest)

== Production and release ==
The shooting of the serial commenced in October 2018. This marks the veteran actress Kushboo Sundar's full-fledged return to television silverscreen after a hiatus of 5 years.

== Dubbed versions ==
Language	Title	Original release	Network(s)	Last aired	Ref.
Malayalam	Lakshmi Stores	7 January 2019	Surya TV	13 September 2019	
Kannada	Lakshmi	8 June 2020	Udaya TV	3 April 2021	
Telugu	Bommarillu	29 June 2020	Gemini TV	23 October 2020	
Bengali	Laxmi Store	5 April 2021	Sun Bangla	11 July 2021	

== Crossover and special episodes ==
- On 18 January 2019, Kanmani had a crossover with Lakshmi Stores.
- From 13 May 2019 – 18 May 2019, Roja had a crossover with Lakshmi Stores.
- From 16 September 2019 to 21 September 2019, Lakshmi Stores had a one-hour special episode from 9PM to 10PM IST.
