= Local Times =

- Genre: Workplace comedy Drama
- Created by: Abbhinav Kastura; Praveen Muthurangan
- Directed by: Naveen George Thomas
- Starring: Rishikanth; Abdool Lee; Adwitha Arumugam; Maurish Dass; R. Pandiarajan; Chinni Jayanth
- Country of origin: India
- Original language: Tamil
- No. of seasons: 1
- No. of episodes: 7

Production
- Producer: Jithin Thorai
- Production company: Fanboy Production

Original release
- Network: Amazon Prime Video
- Release: March 13, 2026

Local Times is a 2026 Indian Tamil-language workplace comedy-drama streaming television series created by Abbhinav Kastura and Praveen Muthurangan for Amazon Prime Video. Directed by Naveen George Thomas in his directorial debut, the series stars Rishikanth, Abdool Lee, Adwitha Arumugam, Maurish Dass, R. Pandiarajan, and Chinni Jayanth.

The series centers on a struggling local newspaper and follows four friends managing the publication.

== Synopsis ==
The story revolves around ''Namma Seidhi'', a once-respected regional weekly newspaper founded by the grandfather of Veera. In a landscape dominated by instant digital media and social media trends, the publication is on the verge of financial collapse, surviving primarily on the hope and grit of its small team.

Veera, driven by a sense of legacy, works alongside his best friend Azhagu, the resourceful Valli, and a dedicated intern, Muthu. Rather than hard-hitting investigative journalism, the team's daily routine often involves the more mundane struggles of news-gathering, securing local advertisements, managing mounting debts, and navigating petty office politics.

== Cast ==
- Rishikanth as Veera
- Abdool Lee as Azhagu
- Adwitha Arumugam as Srivalli (Valli)
- Maurish Dass as Muthu
- R. Pandiarajan as Vallal
- Chinni Jayanth as Aasiriyar Chelladurai
- Nandhitha Sreekumar as Ranee
- Avinash Raghudevan as Anand

== Release ==
Amazon Prime Video released the series trailer on 6 March 2026. Local Times premiered on the platform a week later, on 13 March.

== Reception ==
The series received generally positive reviews, with critics describing it as a light-hearted and feel-good watch. The Times of India noted that while the script relied on "contrived writing," the performances and "core friendship" made it an engaging "time-pass" watch.

Writing for The Hollywood Reporter India, Vishal Menon characterized the show as "basic background viewing pleasure," citing the relatable setting and likeable characters.

Scroll.in found the show's focus was on character-driven humor rather than the mechanics of journalism, remarking that "low on news-gathering and high on joke-gathering."

Cinema Express gave a negative review in which M Narayani stated ..."the screenplay starts to shred apart due to the lack of a novel premise. The comedy sequences too offer no respite from the drab scenes, and every time a character tries to break into a joke or two, the results lie somewhere in between eye-roll-inducing and something as old as the 2000s"
