= Namma Oorukku Ennadhan Achu =

2021 Indian Tamil-language comedy drama film

- Theatrical release poster
- Directed by: Nel Senthil Kumar
- Produced by: Pookadai G. Settu; G. Arulkumar
- Starring: Mahendran; Miyasree Soumya
- Music by: Srikanth Deva
- Production company: GS Arts
- Release date: 19 March 2021
- Running time: 110 minutes
- Country: India
- Language: Tamil

Namma Oorukku Ennadhan Achu (transl. Whatever has happened to our own village/town) is a 2021 Indian Tamil-language comedy drama mystery thriller film directed by Nel Senthil Kumar. The film stars Mahendran and Miyasree Soumya in the main lead roles. The film had its theatrical release on 19 March 2021.

== Cast ==
- Mahendran as Nalla Thambi
- Miyasree Soumya as Kodi
- R. Sundarrajan
- Manoj Kumar
- Meera Krishnan as Nalla Thambi's mother
- Appukutty as Nalla Thambi's uncle
- Pasanga Sivakumar as Kodi's father
- Thavasi
- Benjamin
- Lollu Sabha Udhaya
- Mippusamy as Nalla Thambi's friend
- Kadhal Saravanan
- Supergood Subramani as Priest

== Soundtrack ==
Soundtrack was composed by Srikanth Deva.

- Nenjaluthakaari – Jithin, Namitha
- Konda Mela – Senthil Ganesh, Rajalakshmi, Ayyadurai, Kadaloor Jyothi

== Reception ==
A critic from Vikatan wrote that director Nal Senthilkumar's intention to talk about an important matter is right. But, the story and comedies he has taken for it make us say, 'What is wrong with Tamil cinema?'.
