= Nayaki (Kannada TV series) =

- Genre: Family; Romance
- Created by: Sri Anagha Creations
- Directed by: Shashidhar K
- Starring: Hema Choudhary, Deepak Mahadev, Kavyasri
- Theme music composer: Surendranath B.R.
- Opening theme: "Brahmagichihoda Banna Haleyali"
- Country of origin: India
- Original language: Kannada

Production
- Producer: Sambhashiva Rao Nadella

Original release
- Network: Udaya TV
- Release: 17 June 2019 – 9 April 2020

Related
- Nayagi

Nayaki is an Indian family drama which premiered on 17 June 2019 on Udaya TV and ended on 9 April 2020 starring Hema Chaudhary, Deepak Madhav and Kavyasri in lead roles with Lakshmi Siddaiah, Haripriya, Bhaskar, Mansi and Rachana Gowda in supporting roles. It is an official remake of Sun TV's Nayagi.

== Plot ==
Unaware of the facts, Soundarya works as a maid in the house of a man who killed her father and usurped his property. Coincidentally, she falls in love with his son. When she learns the truth she seeks to exact revenge of his father and Baddi Bangaramna as Hema Choudhary playing main role in this series.

== Cast ==
- Hema Chaudhary as Bangaramma
- Deepak Mahadev
- Kavyasri
- Lakshmi Siddaiah
- Haripriya
- Bhaskar
- Mansi
- Rohith Nagesh
- Rachana Gowda
- Tejaswini Anand Kumar

== Adaptations ==
Language	Title	Premiere date	Network(s)	Last aired	Notes
Tamil	Nayagi நாயகி	19 February 2018	Sun TV	31 October 2020	Original
Kannada	Nayaki ನಾಯಕಿ	17 June 2019	Sun Udaya	9 April 2020	Remake
Telugu	Bhagyarekha భాగ్యరేఖ	24 June 2019	Sun Gemini	6 November 2021	Remake
Marathi	Nashibvan नशीबवान	15 September 2025	Star Pravah	25 April 2026	Remake
