= Nakshathra Nagesh =

Indian actress

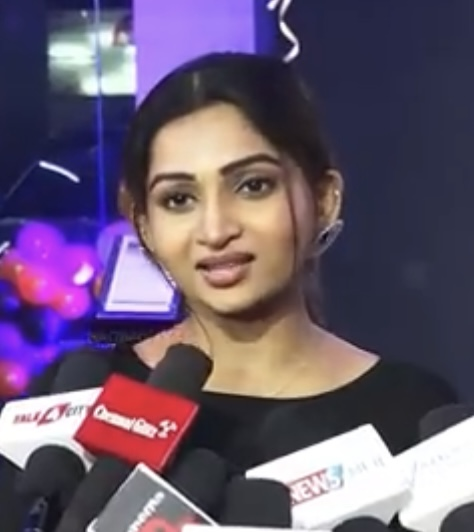
- Nakshathra in 2021
- Born: Chennai, India
- Occupations: Actress; television host
- Years active: 2013- present
- Spouse: Raghav (m. 2021)

Nakshathra Nagesh is an Indian actress and television host who has worked in Tamil films and television shows.

== Career ==
Nakshathra was schooled at Chettinad Vidyashram in Chennai. She studied hotel management at IHM, before moving into the entertainment industry as a video jockey. She first worked on Thanthi TV by hosting the show Vaanavil before moving on to work as a host on television shows such as Sun Singer for Sun TV, and as an awards host for ceremonies such as Sun Kudumbam Viruthugal and the South Indian International Movie Awards. Nakshatra also acted in short films such as En Iniye Pon Nilave, while also making appearances in small roles in the feature films, Settai (2013) and Vaayai Moodi Pesavum (2014). She then appeared alongside an ensemble cast in Balaji Mohan's web series, As I'm Suffering From Kadhal, which marked one of the first Tamil language web-series. A reviewer noted that Nakshatra "looks fantastic and plays her role perfectly."

Nakshatra subsequently took on a leading role in Khushbu's television series Lakshmi Stores, which marked her first lead appearance on a primetime Tamil television drama. Portraying the timid Bhagyalakshmi, Nakshatra won critical acclaim for her portrayal of the character. In 2018, she was also listed by the Chennai Times as the fourth most "desirable woman on television".

== Personal life ==
Nakshathra got engaged to Raghav in early 2021, and they married on 9 December 2021.

== Filmography ==
=== Films ===
Feature films

Key
†	Denotes films that have not yet been released

Year	Film	Role(s)	Ref.
2013	Settai	Gayathri	
2014	Vaayai Moodi Pesavum	Saraswathi	
2014	Samsaaram Aarogyathinu Haanikaram	Saraswathi	Malayalam film
2014	Pulivaal	Monica's Friend	
2015	Irumbu Kuthirai	College Student	
2016	Nambiyaar	Confused Girl	
2017	Indrajith	College Student	
2019	Mr. Local	Sowmiya	
2022	Hey Sinamika	RJ Divya	
TBA	Vanjagan †	TBA	
TBA	Vanigan †	TBA	

Short films

Year	Film	Role(s)	Ref.
2015	En Iniya Pon Nilave	Megha	
2017	Yeno Vaanilai Maaruthey	Archana	
2020	Kadhal Ondru Kanden	Jenni	

=== Television ===
Reality

Year	Name	Role(s)	Network
2014	Vaanavil	Host	Thanthi TV
2015	Jodi Number One Season 8	Contestant	Vijay TV
2015–2017	Sun Singer Season 4 & 5	Host	Sun TV
2021	Kana Kaanum Kaalangal Reunion	Host	Star Vijay
2021	Rani Maharani	Host	Star Vijay
2022	The Galatta Crown 2022	Host	Kalaignar TV
2022	Anda Ka Kasam	Participant	Star Vijay
2022	Koodi Vazhnthal Kodi Nanmai	Contestant	Star Vijay

Shows

Year	Name	Role(s)	Channel	
2015–2016	Vani Rani	Rudhra	Sun TV	
2017	As I'm Suffering From Kadhal	Tanvi	Disney+ Hotstar	
2018–2020	Lakshmi Stores	Bhagya Lakshmi	Sun TV	Bilingual series
2019	Lakshmi Stores	Bhagya Lakshmi	Gemini TV	
2019	Roja	Bhagya Lakshmi (Special appearance)	Sun TV	
2020	Minnale	Herself (Special appearance)	Sun TV	
2020	Thirumagal	Herself (Special appearance)	Sun TV	
2020	Nayagi	Divya	Sun TV	
2021–2024	Thamizhum Saraswathiyum	Saraswathi Thamizharasan	Star Vijay	
2021	Pandian Stores	Saraswathi (Special appearance)	Star Vijay	
2022	Bharathi Kannamma	Saraswathi (Special appearance)	Star Vijay	
2026–Present	Azhagae Azhagu	Azhagumadhi	Star Vijay	
2026	Ayyanar Thunai	Herself (Cameo appearance)	Star Vijay	

== Awards and nominations ==
Year	Work	Award	Category	Result	Ref.
2017	En Iniya Pon Nilave	1st SIIMA Short Film Awards	Best Short Film Actress	Won	
2019	Lakshmi Stores	Galata Nakshatra Awards	Best Debut Actor Of The Year –Female	Won	
2019	Lakshmi Stores	Sun Kudumbam Viruthugal	Popular Heroine	Won	
2019	Lakshmi Stores	Sun Kudumbam Viruthugal	Best Heroine	Nominated	
2019	Lakshmi Stores	Sun Kudumbam Viruthugal	Best Romantic Couple (with Hussain Ahmed Khan)	Won	
2022	Thamizhum Saraswathiyum	7th Annual Vijay Television Awards	Favorite On-Screen Pair (with Deepak Dinkar)	Won	
