= Sevappi =

2024 film by M S Raaja

- Promotional release poster
- Directed by: M S Raaja
- Produced by: Rajeshwar Kalisamy; Prasanna Balachandran
- Starring: Poornima Ravi; Rishikanth; Shravan Athvethan
- Cinematography: Manoharan M
- Edited by: Vachu Lakshmin
- Music by: A. Praveen Kumar
- Production company: Erumugal Network
- Distributed by: Aha Tamil
- Release date: 12 January 2024
- Country: India
- Language: Tamil

Sevappi is a 2024 Indian Tamil-language drama written and directed by M S Raaja. The film was produced by Rajeshwar Kalisamy and Prasanna Balachandran under the banner of Erumugal Network. The film stars Shravan Athvethan, Poornima Ravi and Rishikanth in the lead roles with Dilli, Sebastin Antony, Rajamani, Thanesh Venkat, Thirunavukkarasu and Mimmο in the supporting roles. A. Praveen Kumar composed the music of the film. Manoharan M handled the cinematography and Vachu Lakshmin edited the film.

The film was premiered on streaming service Aha Tamil on 12 January 2024.

== Cast ==
- Shravan Athvethan as Kumaran
- Thanesh Venkat as Kilimandu
- Rishikanth as Karnan
- Poornima Ravi as Boomi
- Dilli as Moodan
- Sebastin Antony as Paruthi
- A. Rajamani Paati as Aakaati Paatti
- Thirunavukkarasu as Bomman
- Mimmο
- Vinu Varma as Maandriga

== Production ==
=== Development ===
Sevappi was officially announced by the makers on 25 December 2023. The film was written and directed by M S Raaja. Rajeshwar Kalisamy and Prasanna Balachandran produced the film under the banner of Erumugal Network. Rishikanth and Bigg Boss Tamil season 7 fame Poornima Ravi were cast in the lead roles. A. Praveen Kumar composed the music of the film. Manoharan M handled the cinematography and editing was done by Vachu Lakshmin.

=== Filming ===
The entire film was shot in just 27 days in Madhipalayam, a village between Kerala and Tamil Nadu. During the pre-production stage, director Raaja and his team discovered that many villagers were very much interested in acting, upon which the villagers were given an opportunity to act in this film.

== Music ==
The soundtrack was composed by A. Praveen Kumar.

== Release ==
Sevappi was premiered on streaming service Aha Tamil on 12 January 2024.

== Reception ==
Narayani M of Cinema Express rated the film with 3/5 stars and wrote the film is "an endearing ode to love for animals, mothers and uncles".
