= Label (TV series) =

- Release poster
- Genre: Action; Crime; Drama
- Written by: Jeyachandra Hashmi Arunraja Kamaraj
- Directed by: Arunraja Kamaraj
- Starring: Jai; Tanya Hope; Mahendran; Harishankar Narayanan
- Music by: Sam C. S.
- Country of origin: India
- Original language: Tamil
- No. of seasons: 1
- No. of episodes: 10

Production
- Producer: AJ Prabhakaran
- Cinematography: Dinesh B. Krishnan
- Editor: Raja Arumugam
- Production company: Muthamizh Padaipagam; ARK Entertainment

Original release
- Network: Disney+ Hotstar
- Release: 10 November 2023

Label is a 2023 Tamil-language television series directed by Arunraja Kamaraj who co-wrote the script with Jeyachandra Hashmi for Disney+ Hotstar. The series talks about Article 20 of the Indian Constitution. The principal cast of the series includes Jai, Tanya Hope, Mahendran and Harishankar Narayanan. The series premiered on 10 November 2023 and consists of ten episodes.

== Synopsis ==
The story revolves around the protagonist (Jai) struggle to reach his desired identity and overcoming the identity society has labelled him with.

== Cast ==
- Jai as Prabhakaran
- Tanya Hope as Mahitha
- Mahendran as Veerasekar
- Harishankar Narayanan as Kumaraguru
- Sriman as Ranga
- Charan Raj as Murugesan, Prabha's father
- Rama as Prabha’s mother
- Ilavarasu as Muthuvel
- Suresh Chakravarthy as Paramasivan
- Arish Kumar as Arul Kumaran
- D. R. K. Kiran as Senguttuvan
- Ramesh Thilak as Pazhanivel
- Ashvin Raja
- Jasper as Paathalam

== Production ==
=== Development ===
The series is produced by AJ Prabhakaran under the Muthamizh Padaippagam with ARK Entertainment. Arunraja Kamaraj of Nenjuku Needhi (2022) fame, was roped in to direct the series which he co wrote with Jeyachandra Hashmi. The cinematography was handled by Dinesh Krishnan, editing by Raja Arumugam, Music by Sam C. S.

=== Casting ===
Tamil actor Jai was cast main role. This is his second role in a limited series. Actress Tanya Hope plays the female lead alongside his. In end of March 2023, Actor Mahendran joined the cast. This is his debut role in a limited series.

=== Release ===
It was announced on Thursday 23 March 2023, that the series will be released in Tamil and dubbed in Telugu, Hindi, Malayalam, Marathi, Bengali and Kannada on Disney+ Hotstar.

The first poster was released on 23 March 2023, the poster features the words Label with the caption of a Thirukural in Tamil "தோன்றின் புகழோடு தோன்றும்" (Thondrin Pukalodu Thondrum) which translate to "if you appear in any crowd, ensure you have admirable qualities". The first teaser and motion poster was released on 10 October 2023, the teaser features a visibly a hint of the series being a legal drama.
