= Yellow (2025 film) =

Indian Tamil-language film

- Theatrical release poster
- Directed by: Hari Mahadevan
- Written by: Hari Mahadevan
- Produced by: Prasanth Rangasamy
- Starring: Poornima Ravi; Namita Krishnamurthy; Leela Samson; Prabu Solomon; Vaibhav Murugesan
- Cinematography: Abi Advik
- Edited by: Sri Watson
- Music by: Cliffy Chris; Anand Kashinath
- Production company: Covai Film Factory
- Distributed by: Uthraa Productions
- Release date: 21 November 2025
- Country: India
- Language: Tamil

Yellow is an Indian Tamil-language film directed by Hari Mahadevan in his debut. The film stars Poornima Ravi in her debut as the lead actress alongside Namita Krishnamurthy, Leela Samson and Prabu Solomon in important roles. The film is produced by Prasanth Rangasamy under his Covai Film Factory banner.

Yellow released in theatres on 21 November 2025.

== Cast ==
- Poornima Ravi as Aadhirai
- Vaibhav Murugesan as Sai
- Namita Krishnamurthy as Jenny
- Leela Samson as Kalyani
- Prabhu Solomon as Mani
- Delhi Ganesh
- Vinodhini Vaidyanathan
- Sai Prasanna as Santhosh
- Lokesh
- Jophin Manimala
- Shiju Raghavan
- Aswin Jayaprakash

== Production ==
Bigg Boss season 7 fame Poornima Ravi announced her new project titled Yellow, directed by debutant director Hari Mahadevan, marking her theatrical film debut as the lead actress. The announcement was made through a first look poster by the production house, Covai Film Factory helmed by Prasanth Rangasamy. The film has music scored by Cliffy Chris and Anand Kashinath, cinematography done by Abi Advik, editing done by Sri Watson and art direction by Karthick Krishnan. Apart from Poornima, the film also stars Namita Krishnamurthy, Leela Samson and Prabu Solomon in important roles in important roles alongside Vaibhav Murugesan, Delhi Ganesh, Vinodhini Vaidyanathan, Sai Prasanna, Lokesh, Jophin Manimala, Shiju Raghavan, Aswin Jayaprakash and others in supporting roles.

== Music ==
Yellow

Soundtrack album by: Cliffy Chris; Anand Kashinath
- Genre: Feature film soundtrack
- Language: Tamil
- Label: Saregama
- Producer: Cliffy Chris; Anand Kashinath
External audio
- Yellow - Full Album on YouTube

The trailer-cum-audio launch event was held in Chennai on 11 November 2025.

Track listing
No.	Title	Lyrics	Music	Singer(s)	Length
1.	"Vaazhve Pogudhe"	Sublahshini	Anand Kashinath	Sublahshini
2.	"Adadada"	Sharan Kumar, Anand Kashinath	Anand Kashinath	Anand Kashinath
3.	"Innum Dhooram"	Mohan Rajan	Anand Kashinath	Anand Kashinath, Namratha
4.	"Kanmaniyae"	Saleem R Baadshah	Cliffy Chris	Kapil Kapilan
5.	"Otta Kuduse"	Saleem R Baadshah	Cliffy Chris	Anthony Daasan
6.	"Manase"	Devoid	Cliffy Chris	Sathyaprakash
7.	"Megangal"	Rajesh Sridhar	Cliffy Chris	Shakthisree Gopalan

== Release and reception ==
Yellow released in theatres on 21 November 2025 by Uthraa Productions. Abhinav Subramanian of The Times of India gave the film 3/5 stars and wrote "Flawed, occasionally draggy, leaning hard into its "follow your heart" territory. Also: unexpectedly genuine, populated with people worth spending time with." The film was also reviewed by Vikatan and Hindu Tamil Thisai.
