= Nitham Oru Vaanam =

Indian Tamil language romantic film

- Theatrical release poster
- Directed by: Ra. Karthik
- Written by: Ra. Karthik
- Produced by: Sreenidhi Sagar; P. Rupak Pranav Tej; Ajit Andhare
- Starring: Ashok Selvan; Ritu Varma; Aparna Balamurali; Shivathmika Rajashekar
- Cinematography: Vidhu Ayyanna
- Edited by: Anthony
- Music by: Gopi Sundar; Dharan Kumar
- Production companies: Viacom18 Studios; Rise East Entertainment
- Release date: 4 November 2022
- Running time: 146 minutes
- Country: India
- Language: Tamil

Nitham Oru Vaanam (transl. A sky of eternity) is a 2022 Indian Tamil-language romantic drama film written and directed by Ra. Karthik in his directorial debut. The film stars Ashok Selvan in a triple role alongside Ritu Varma, Aparna Balamurali and Shivathmika Rajashekar in the principal roles. Gopi Sundar composed the film's music and cinematography was performed by Vidhu Ayyanna.

The film was announced in January 2017, but went through a change of cast, and was relaunched in June 2021. It was subsequently released on 4 November 2022 to generally positive reviews.

== Plot ==
The film revolves around Arjun, a young man with OCD. This results in him being rather closed off and seemingly rude to most people and happenings around him, alongside a strong dislike for trying things out of his comfort zone. However, he does have the habit of imagining himself as the protagonist in any story he reads. After a long time, he meets Janani, a woman who he thought understands him, and starts to develop feelings for her. Arjun-Janani's marriage preparations go really well until Janani decides to reconcile with her ex-boyfriend, resulting in their wedding being called off and causing Arjun depression. To help him overcome this hurdle, Arjun's doctor advises him to read the short stories she had written about two couples—Veera-Meenakshi and Mathi-Prabha. This results in three distinct story arcs.

=== Veera-Meenakshi story arc ===
Veera and Meenakshi is a love marriage couple where Veera is a civil engineer and Meenakshi is a mechanical engineer who plays basketball for passion. They share a wonderful life with each other. During a rainy day, a pregnant Meenakshi is left alone in her home, while Veera goes out and unexpectedly encounters a tragic accident. The story abruptly ends there. Arjun, who imagined himself in the place of Veera, is left clueless and angry as to what happened next. He asks the doctor about the remaining story and she asks him to read the other diary to know the answers. When he starts reading, he finds that the new diary has the story of Mathi-Prabha.

=== Mathivadani-Prabhakaran story arc ===
Mathivadani alias Mathi, a care-free girl who wishes for a love marriage, runs away the night before her wedding. En route, she meets Prabhakaran alias Prabha with whom she travels in a car but later comes to know that he consumed poison because of love failure. She admits him in hospital while Mathi's father comes to the hospital looking for her. He asks Prabha to tie the wedding thread around Mathi's neck. When Prabha is about to do so, Mathi falls unconscious with her nose bleeding. Then, the story abruptly ends.

Arjun, desperate to find answers, goes to the doctor's house to confront her. But she says that these both the stories are real life stories and gives the addresses of the real Meenakshi-Veera who are in Kolkata and Mathi-Prabha who are in Himachal Pradesh. Arjun decides to meet them in person to know what happened next in their lives.

On his journey, Arjun is accompanied by Subhadra alias Subha. First, they go to Kolkata to meet Meenakshi, who narrates that Veera died in the building crash. Instead of feeling sad and hopeless, she felt motivated and took her newborn baby to Kolkata to pursue her basketball career and now works as a basketball coach. Arjun feels disappointed and decides to call off the other meeting, but Subha urges him to meet Mathi-Prabha and then decide for himself. So they continue their journey.

There, we come to know Subha's backstory.

=== Subha's Backstory (parallels) arc ===
For some time, we get to know about Subha, who was in a relationship for two years. She was dumped by her boyfriend for another girl. Later he marries that girl and buys a house. Subha is desperate to confront him and ask him the proper and logical reason for breaking up with her but never gets the guts to do so.

Later they go to Himachal Pradesh to meet the second pair. There are accompanied by Prabha's colleague who tells that Prabha alias Prabhakaran is the Deputy Superintendent of Police in Coimbatore and very jovial to everybody. In a daily routine round the city, he stumbles across Mathi and feels instantly smitten by her. Later asks Mathi's hand of marriage to her father, Senniappan, with whom he plots a plan to make her agree along with his consent. Later when the plan goes successful so far, Mathi falls unconscious and later comes to know that she has cancer. Then he continues to tell that even though Mathi got cancer and Prabha knew it, they both were still happy and together with each other. Later when the duo meet Mathi and Prabha, they talk to each other, Prabha tells Arjun that we have to accept some things in life and move on.

Arjun, who changes completely because of both the stories transforms into a different person, starting to admire small things and staying happy always. Later Arjun takes Subha to her ex-boyfriend's house and makes her confront him, to which Subha slaps him and breaks his car.

In the chase from Subha's ex, Arjun confesses his feelings for Subha and Subha reciprocates. The movie ends there as they both run from her boyfriend.

== Cast ==
- Ashok Selvan as
  - R. Arjun
  - Veera
  - DSP V. Prabhakaran IPS alias Prabha
    - Jiiva as Real V. Prabhakaran (Prabha) (Cameo)
- Ritu Varma as Subhadra aka Subha (Voice-over by Krithika Nelson)
- Aparna Balamurali as Mathivadani alias Mathi
  - Eesha Rebba as Real Mathi (Cameo)
- Shivathmika Rajashekar as Meenakshi
  - Sshivada as Real Meenakshi (Cameo)
- Vinsu Rachel as S. Janani, Arjun’s ex-fiance
- Arjunan as Shiva, Janani's boyfriend turned husband
- Abhirami as Doctor Krishnaveni
- Kaali Venkat as Soosai Ganesan
- Azhagam Perumal as Seniyappan, Madhi’s father (in imagination)
- Kalyani Natarajan as Arjun’s mother
- Mathew Varghese as Arjun’s father
- Badava Gopi as Arjun’s Boss
- Mona Bedre as Arjun’s office colleague
- Soundariya Nanjundan as Arjun’s office colleague
- Chendu as Scooby, Arjun's dog

== Production ==
=== Development ===
The film was first announced to the media in January 2017, when it was reported that Dulquer Salmaan would work on a Tamil film by debutant director Ra. Karthik, to be produced by Kenanya Films. Described as "romantic entertainer-cum-road movie", Karthik stated that the film would have four lead actresses and that discussions for roles were held with Nivetha Pethuraj and Megha Akash. Other actresses including Akshara Haasan, Nazriya Nazim and Parvathy were also considered for the film, though none of them were officially signed on for the project. In June 2017, Karthik stated that the casting process for the lead actresses was still ongoing, and that there were no plans of making a Malayalam version of the film, despite speculation. George C. Williams, Sreekar Prasad and debutant Dheena Dayalan joined the team as the film's cinematographer, editor and music composer respectively, while the director stated that the team had planned to begin production by December 2017. Considering the film's theme of travel, Karthik revealed that the film would be shot across locations including Chennai, Pollachi, Coimbatore, Chandigarh and Nainital. Actress Shalini Pandey joined the cast of the film during October 2017, but production was delayed as a result of Kenanya Films' financial problems.

After a brief delay, the first look poster of the film was released in June 2018, confirming the identity of the principal crew members. Karthik noted that he initially wanted to title the film as Vaanam – after the sky, which changes its form and colour regularly, like the lead character – but the presence of an earlier film prompted him to choose Vaan. The film was launched in December 2018, with a ceremony held in Chennai attended by Dulquer and crew members.

=== Casting and filming ===
At the event, Kalyani Priyadarshan and Kriti Kharbanda were announced as two of the lead actresses, with Karthik suggesting that the storyline travels from "Chennai to Kolkata" and that the film would be "along the lines" of Jab We Met (2007). Priya Bhavani Shankar also joined the film's cast in February 2019. However, the production studio's continued financial problems and the COVID-19 pandemic prompted the film to be continually delayed and later dropped.

In late June 2021, Viacom18 Studios in association with Rise East Entertainment, relaunched Karthik's directorial debut, with the title being changed to Nitham Oru Vaanam, from Vaan. Several changes were also made to the cast and crew owing to date clashes. Ashok Selvan replaced Dulquer in the lead role, while actresses Ritu Varma, Aparna Balamurali and Shivathmika Rajashekar were cast in the leading female roles. Music composer Gopi Sundar and editor Anthony also joined the project, replacing Dheena Dayalan and Sreekar Prasad. Cinematographer George C. Williams was replaced by Vidhu Ayyanna due to the extensive delays and schedule conflicts.

== Music ==
Nitham Oru Vaanam

Soundtrack album by Gopi Sundar
- Released: 31 October 2022
- Recorded: 2022
- Genre: Feature film soundtrack
- Length: 24:57
- Language: Tamil
- Label: Zee Music South
- Producer: Gopi Sundar

Gopi Sundar chronology
Thalli Pogathey (2021)	Nitham Oru Vaanam (2022)	Theerppu (2022)

The music of the film is composed by Gopi Sundar. Dharan Kumar composed the background score and a promotional song "Thada Buda Kaathu" sung by Aparna Balamurali.

Track listing
No.	Title	Lyrics	Singer(s)	Length
1.	"Unakkena Naan"	Krithika Nelson	Deepthi Suresh & Deepak Blue	3:33
2.	"Kaatril Sikki"	Krithika Nelson	Deepak Blue	4:00
3.	"Paathi Nee Paathi Naa"	Krithika Nelson	Krithika Nelson	3:36
4.	"Oru Vezham"	Krithika Nelson	Krithika Nelson	6:02
5.	"Vandhai En Varamagave"	Krithika Nelson	Keerthana Vaidhyanathan	6:08
6.	"Yaara Ve"	Krithika Nelson	Megha Harini	4:22
Total length:				24:57

== Release ==
=== Theatrical ===
The film was released theatrically on 4 November 2022, clashing with Coffee with Kadhal and Love Today.

=== Home media ===
The film began streaming on Netflix from 2 December 2022.

== Reception ==
The film received positive reviews from critics.

M. Suganth of The Times of India rated the film 3 out of 5 stars and wrote "By the end, just as we expect, Arjun learns to be positive". Navein Darshan of Cinema Express rated the film 3.5 out of 5 stars and wrote "Despite being made on a massive canvas, NOV is a simple film that conveys a simple message". Bhuvanesh Chandar of The Hindu called the film "A tribute to the kids within us who saw towels as capes, and not many films manage to do that as elegantly as this one". A critic from Dinamalar rated the film 3 out of 5 stars.
