= Malavika Menon =

Indian actress

- Born: Kodungallur, Kerala, India
- Occupations: Actress; dancer
- Years active: 2012–present

Malavika Menon is an Indian actress. She plays lead roles in Malayalam films and supporting roles in Tamil films.

== Career ==
She made her career debut in 2012 with the film Nidra. She went on to play minor supporting roles before doing lead role in 916 in 2012.

== Filmography ==
Year	Title	Role	Language	Notes
2011	Ente Kannan	Actress	Malayalam	Album
2012	Nidra	Revathi	Malayalam	
2012	Hero	Annie Thankachan	Malayalam	
2012	916	Meera	Malayalam	Lead Role
2013	Ivan Veramathiri	Divya	Tamil	
2013	Vizha	Rakkamma	Tamil	
2013	Nadan	Priyamvada Devadas	Malayalam	
2014	Bramman	Lakshmi	Tamil	
2014	Speechless	Student	Malayalam	Short film
2015	Vethu Vettu	Mahalakshmi	Tamil	
2015	Sir C. P.	Young Mary	Malayalam	
2015	Monsoon	Jessy	Malayalam	
2015	John Honai	Maria	Malayalam	
2016	Nijama Nizhala	Vadhana	Tamil	
2016	Buddhanum Chaplinum Chirikkunnu	Strange lady	Malayalam	
2016	Love K Run	Anjali	Telugu	
2017	Devayanam	Sathyabhama	Malayalam	
2017	Hello Dubaikkaran	Jyothi	Malayalam	
2018	Njan Marykutty	Anniekutty	Malayalam	
2018	Joseph	Diana Joseph	Malayalam	
2019	Porinju Mariam Jose	Lilly	Malayalam	
2019	Edakkad Battalion 06	Shalini	Malayalam	
2019	Mamangam	Dancer	Malayalam	
2020	Al Mallu	Singer/Dancer	Malayalam	
2020	Love FM	Rabiya	Malayalam	
2021	Pei Mama	Pooja	Tamil	
2021	Ammailu Anthe Ado Type		Telugu	
2022	Aaraattu	Aswathy Kaimal	Malayalam	
2022	Oruthee	Sister Amala	Malayalam	
2022	CBI 5: The Brain	Smitha	Malayalam	
2022	Puzhu	Bharathi's friend	Malayalam	
2022	Kaduva	Mary	Malayalam	Cameo appearance
2022	Paappan	Anitha / Aisha Fathima	Malayalam	
2022	Saraswathi Dheviyum Companikkaarum	Sarasathi Devi	Malayalam	Short film
2022	Kallakaamukan	Fathima	Malayalam	Short film
2022	Second Hand Kalyanam	Reshma	Malayalam	Short film
2022	Deliveriyan Pranayam	Daisy	Malayalam	Short film
2022	Aruvaa Sanda	Ramya	Tamil	
2023	Padmini	Laya	Malayalam	Cameo appearance
2023	Kurukkan	Arya	Malayalam	
2024	Thankamani	Rahael Joshua Mathan	Malayalam	
2024	Once Upon a Time in Kochi		Malayalam	
2025	Kalamkaval	Babitha	Malayalam	
