= Poornima Ravi =

Indian actress and YouTuber

- Born: Poornima Ravi; Vellore, Tamil Nadu, India
- Education: Vellore Institute of Technology
- Occupations: Actress, Youtuber
- Years active: 2019–Present

Poornima Ravi is an Indian actress who has primarily appeared in Tamil films. She has played supporting roles in films such as Plan Panni Pannanum (2021) and Annapoorani (2023). In 2023, she participated in the reality show Bigg Boss 7 as a contestant.

== Early life ==
Poornima was born in Vellore, Tamil Nadu. As she grew up, she studied at Shrishti Matriculation secondary high school, Vellore. She later pursued a degree in engineering at Vellore Institute of Technology and eventually pursued her career on her acting.

== Career ==
Poornima Ravi, began her career by creating dubsmash videos that quickly gained her popularity and paved the way for opportunities in short films.

In 2023, she participated in the reality show Bigg Boss 7 Tamil Edition on Vijay TV as a contestant.

In 2024, she has played the lead role in the film Sevappi, directed by M S Raaja.

== Filmography ==
=== Films ===
Key
†	Denotes films that have not yet been released

Year	Title	Role	Notes	Ref.
2019	Mine	Renu	Independent film directly released on YouTube	
2021	Plan Panni Pannanum	Radha		
2022	Chotta	Ganga		
2023	Annapoorani	Keerthi		
2024	Sevappi	Bhoomi	OTT release; Aha Tamil	
2024	Nalla Perai Vaanga Vendum Pillaigale	Sofia Banu		
2025	Trauma	Selvi		
2025	Yellow	Aadhirai		
2026	Parimala and Co	Gomathi		

=== Television ===
Year	Title	Role	Channel	Notes	Ref.
2023–2024	Bigg Boss 7	Contestant	Star Vijay	Walked out Day 96 with 16 lakhs (2nd Highest amount cash box exit in the history of Biggboss Tamil as of now)	
2025	Bigg Boss 9	Guest	Star Vijay	To promote the movie Yellow. (Day 46)	

=== Web Series ===
Year	Title	Role	Channel	Ref.
2020	Selfie Kadhal	Poornima		
2021	The Roommate	Poornima		
2021	In my Vaalkai	Priya		
2026	Lingam	Padma	Disney+Hotstar	

=== Music videos ===
Year	Title	Singer(s)
2020	Ennai Vittu Sendravaney	Madhura Dhara Talluri & Aswath Ajith
2021	Kanda Kanavu	Anand Kashinath, Sublahshini
2022	Adiyaathi	Arun Gautham

== See also ==
- List of Indian film actresses
