= Thamizhum Saraswathiyum =

2021 Indian television series

- Genre: Drama
- Created by: S. Kumaran
- Screenplay by: V.K Amithraj; C.U Muthuselvan; Dialogues: Nandhan Sridharan (Episode 1-90) S.Mardhu Shankar (Episode 91-278); Alvin Prashanth Raj (Episode 279-717)
- Directed by: S. Kumaran
- Creative directors: B. Srinivasan; Raadhika Srinivasan
- Starring: Deepak Dinkar; Nakshatra Nagesh
- Theme music composer: Kiran
- Opening theme: Neeyum Nannum Anbe
- Country of origin: India
- Original language: Tamil
- No. of seasons: 1
- No. of episodes: 717

Production
- Producers: Vikatan Televistas; B.Srinivasan
- Cinematography: S. T. Martz
- Editors: B. Chandru; Sasi K Basant; G.V Rajan; Palaniswamy
- Camera setup: Multi-camera
- Running time: 19–22 minutes
- Production company: Vikatan Televistas Pvt Ltd

Original release
- Network: Star Vijay; Disney+ Hotstar
- Release: 12 July 2021 – 19 April 2024

Thamizhum Saraswathiyum is an Indian Tamil-language soap opera. It stars Deepak Dinkar and Nakshatra Nagesh. It debuted on 12 July 2021 and ended on 19 April 2024 on Star Vijay and streamed on Disney+ Hotstar. S. Kumaran is the series' director, and Radhika Srinivasan and B. Srinivasan are its producers for Vikatan Televistas.

The story is about how Saraswathi chooses to be married in order to avoid her father's continuous criticism of her for not studying well because she is looked down upon for not studying. Though she is an ignorant girl, the prospective grooms demand more money to marry her. Nevertheless, she meets Tamil, an uneducated person with a higher professional value. Both of them marry while keeping it a secret. This shocks the Tamil family since it describes how they integrate as a family, become accepted, and acquire a degree and live happily.

== Plot ==
The chapter starts with Tamizharasu, commonly known as Tamil, a tenth-grade dropout who deserted his studies due to his family's financial hardship. His family consists of seven members: his mother and father, Kothai and Natesan, who originally established Kothai Industries, which is now managed by Tamil, and his younger brother, Karthik, who has fulfilled an MBA, and his sister, Ragini, who is studying MBBS, Abitha, who appears to work as a maid in their house and is taken into account a part of their family as well as an orphan by Kothai, and Tamil's friend Namachivayam, who lives in Kothai's house. Kothai has an older brother whose daughter intended to marry Tamil but subsequently withdrew according to his studies, provoking Kothai to dare her to find another husband.

On the other hand, it focuses on Saraswathi's family, whereby her father Chokkalingam serves as a school administrator and detests Saraswati because she's been studying grade 12 for almost 10 years. Saraswathi's mother, Vasuki, is an educator who attempts to make her feel better. Saraswati's paternal grandmother, who periodically supports her, nor her younger sister Kavya, who also is continuing her B.Tech. in a university, try to teach Saraswati, but she does not understand. Her brother Arun, who has also been pursuing his B.Tech. in AI (Artificial Science), absolutely hates Saraswati's studies. After the event of the turned-down wedding proposal, a demotivated Tamil prays to the God Saraswati, where Saraswati visits and hides behind a wall pretending to talk as the God, she tells him jokingly that he will meet a girl three to four times while it is raining and he marry her. After this, a happy Tamil tells this to Namachivayam, who really doesn't believe him, and those who return to the temple, where they meet, and it begins to rain.

The storyline then moves on to Chandrakala, another former sub-collector, who is Vasundhara and Aditya's mother. Vasundhara is smitten with Karthik, Thamizh's younger brother. Love is something Kodhai despises. To Thamizh, Karthik professes his love for Vasundhara. Eventually after a lot of problems, the family agrees and Karthik and Vasundhara marry. Meanwhile, one boy attempted to throw a paper at Saraswathi, she gets in trouble cheating on an exam. Chokkalingam (Saraswathi's father) gets enraged by this. Saraswathi comes to terms with her feelings for Tamizh. Kodhai arranges for Thamizh to marry Suhasini. Thamizh realizes his love for Saraswathi on the day of their engagement. Is he planning to marry Saraswathi or Suhasini?

Suhasini states she doesn't want to marry Tamizh because of his education level a few days later. One day, Saraswathi finds Kodhai by chance and saves her as she passes out. Saraswathi begins to appeal to Kodhai. Thamizh confesses his love for Saraswathi to Chokkalingam one day, and the latter agrees to see the clan. She continues to like Kodhai and when he starts asking questions about her qualifications, Saraswathi lies and reveals she took MBA to marry Thamizh. Kodhai agrees to marry Thamizh and Saraswathi despite Saraswathi's lack of education. Chandrakala and Geetha are continually attempting to prevent Thamizh and Saraswathi from marrying. Thamizh's aunt, Geetha, despises Kodhai's family and frequently participates with Chandrakala in her schemes. Geetha discovers Saraswathi's educational level one day, but she is rendered speechless due to an accident. When Geetha escapes from the hospital and she and Chandrakala reveal the truth about Saraswathi's education, The euphoria of Thamizh and Saraswathi is fleeting. As a result of Kodhai's passing out from shock, the entire family turns against Thamizh. Kodhai passes out from shock, and the entire family turns both against Thamizh and Saraswathi as a result. Saraswathi now plans to complete Grade 12 and pursue an MBA to prove herself and gain legitimacy from her family.

When Kothai returned home following her heart attack. She invites Saraswathi and Tamil inside the house. Vasundhara at the time supported both, although Karthi opposed them. Saraswathi was given the directive to avoid speaking negatively about her parents. She also gets ready for the 12th-grade exam so she can demonstrate her point in full. Geetha and Chandrakala are attempting to split while making various trap plans. While Kothai and Natesan sent Thamil& Saraswathi and Karthik& Vasundhara for a honeymoon to experience and comprehend themselves in Yercaud, Vasundhara and Karthik haven't yet begun living their marital life. They then come back and are united once more. Vasundhara also becomes pregnant, and Chandrakala throws a party for everyone to enjoy.

Thamizh and Saraswathi are split apart by Chandrakala and Madhu. The marriage between Thamizh and Saraswathi starts to fall apart. After being encircled by thugs, Madhu calls Thamizh for assistance. She is saved by an inebriated Thamizh. Madhu later claims to be expecting Thamizh's child. When Kodhai's family learns of this, they have 24 hours to establish Thamizh's innocence. Evidence that Madhu lied about her pregnancy is provided to Saraswathi. Ragini, Thamizh’s sister, catches feelings for Aadhi, Vasundhara’s brother. He rejects Ragini's proposal when she asks him to marry her. Arjun, a colleague of Karthik saves Ragini when she is sad. As Arjun and Ragini get closer, they begin to fall in love. Even though Arjun only married Ragini to exact revenge on Kodhai's family, they eventually got married, while Saraswathi begins to question Arjun's evil intentions.

As Saraswati learns of Arjun's nefarious plans, she tries to convince everyone in the Kodhai family that Arjun isn’t the good guy that they think he is. However, people misinterpret her because they think she is solely to blame. Raagini marries Arjun fully after that. In this scene, Arjun manipulates his family to engage in games with Kodhai and is torn apart. Geetha and Tamizh also expose Chandrakala, causing Vasundhra to part ways with her until she realises what she did was wrong. As the chairman of Kodhai Industries, Kodhai resigns. She assigns Karthi, Tamizh, and Arjun the responsibility of selecting the next chairman. As Tamizh is blamed, Arjun plays a part in stabbing himself and forcing himself into the hospital. Tamizh is opposed by the entire family when they follow.

When Tamil is startled, he and Saraswathi make a choice to leave the Kothai Natesan mansion. They share a home with Namachi. Vasuki and Chokkilingam arrive to help, but Tamil decides not to take their help and wants to be independent. Tamil and Namachi are forced to flee from their home and into another one after Arjun bribes Namachi’s landlord and has him evict them. Without Tamil's knowledge, Saraswathi leaves for work at the repair shop where she works to make ends meet. A few days later, Tamil founded his own business, Saraswathi Industries, which Kodhai and the minister inaugurated. Meenakshi and Vasuki come across Saraswathi and find her working in a mechanic shop to help Tamizh with the bills, and confront Tamizh about it. Upon finding out, Tamizh gets angry since Saraswathi didn’t tell him, but later sympathises and understands why she didn’t tell him. Vasundhara is similarly left alone at home, where Saraswathi discovers that she’s fallen down the stairs and comes to her aid. Vasundhara also gives birth to a child, and Chandrakala thoroughly repents of her actions and begs them both for forgiveness, which they both accept and Vasundhara is reunited with Chandrakala after that. Despite Chandrakala's attempts to unite Tamizh and Saraswathi with Kodhai, Kodhai rejects them. Kothai thinks they came to confront and refute them.

Arjun makes a strategy to lure Kodhai into believing that she is transferring her Anna Nagar property to Ragini on her daughter's request. But Arjun tricks Kodhai into transferring all her properties to Ragini. Ragini later being aware of Arjun's masquerade, supports him and commands her family leave the house. Subsequently, Kodhai and her family vacate the house and become homeless. Kodhai and her family along with Saraswati and Adi take refuge in a temple. Kodhai confronts the deity questioning the scenario she's been put into. Meanwhile Saras informs Tamizh about the situation. Tamizh ruffles Arjun's feathers and collects his family from the temple and brings them to his home. Ragini and family celebrate the departure of Kodhai and Natesan and the transfer of all the properties into Arjun's hand by lighting fireworks atop their house in an attempt to disrespect Kodhai. Kodhai and her family could only watch the atrocities in agony from far.

Tamizh rents a larger house to accommodate his family. Tamizh and his family are confronted by Arjun on the road. Kodhai reprimands Arjun for his dishonesty and curses him. Arjun being angry at Kodhai and her family vows to take revenge on Kodhai's family. Arjun later draws a sniper rifle on Tamizh to murder him silently from a distance, but Ragini draws on Arjun, the situation ends when Ragini agrees to transfer all the properties from her to Arjun.

Then, Ragini gets delivery pain, and Tamizh decides to help her, by taking her to the hospital. Then, Ragini's baby is born. Ragini apologizes to both Tamizh and Saraswathi for misunderstanding them. Meghna, a businesswoman based in Bangalore, found herself at odds with Tamizh from the moment they clashed at the airport, sparked by Meghna's unintentional insult towards Nammachi. However, their dynamic took a turn when Tamizh came to Meghna's rescue during a perilous situation, fostering a sense of gratitude between them. Unbeknownst to Meghna, Nammachi, influenced by his own motives, misled her into believing that Tamizh was single, igniting Meghna's feelings for him.

As their professional relationship blossomed into a partnership, Meghna discovered Tamizh's marital status, leading to a tumultuous confrontation fueled by her sense of betrayal. In a surprising twist, Meghna, driven by anger, allied herself with Arjun, initiating schemes against Tamizh and his business. However, as the truth unfolded, Meghna realized the deceit of her uncle Kalivardhan and his son Madhan, prompting feelings of remorse for her misguided actions towards Tamizh.

Amidst the turmoil, Kalivardhan, Madhan, and Arjun conspired to eliminate Meghna and frame Saraswathi for the crime. In a tragic turn of events, Meghna and her foster mother Kamala met their demise at the hands of hired goons, resulting in Saraswathi's wrongful arrest. Through Tamizh's diligent efforts, Saraswathi was exonerated, and the true culprits were brought to justice.

Meanwhile, Arjun's past transgressions, fueled by his relentless ambition, came to light, leading to a reckoning within his own family. Faced with the consequences of his actions, including his mother's drastic measure of poisoning him, Arjun experienced a change of heart, seeking redemption and reconciliation with the Kodhai and Natesan families.

With reconciliation and forgiveness prevailing, the families united, paving the way for Nammachi and Abitha's marriage, symbolizing a fresh start and the restoration of harmony among all involved.

== Cast ==
=== Main ===
- Deepak Dinkar as Thamizharasan Natesan "Thamizh" - Saraswathi's husband, Meghna's one-sided lover; Kothai and Natesan's elder son; Karthikeyan and Raagini's elder brother; Chairman of the Saraswathi Industries
- Nakshatra Nagesh as Saraswathi Thamizharasan - Thamizh's wife; Chokkalingam and Vasuki's elder daughter; Kavyapriya and Arunprasad's elder sister. She has been looked down upon for not being able to complete her promised MBA degree. (2021–2024)
- Rayan as Arjun - Raagini's husband; Lakshmi's son; Jayanthi's younger brother. An MBA graduate who works as a director for Kodhai Industries. He loved and married Raagini to enter Thamizh's household and join his family. (2022–2024)

=== Supporting ===
- Meera Krishna as Kodhainayagi Natesan: Natesan's wife; Thamizh, Karthik and Raagini's mother (2021–2024).
- Ramachandran Mahalingam as Natesan: Kodhai's husband: Thamizh, Karthik and Raagini's father (2021–2024).
- Navin Vetri as Karthikeyan Natesan: Kodhai and Natesan's younger son; Tamizh's younger brother and Vasundhara's husband; Ragini's elder brother (2021–2024).
- Dharshna Sripal Golecha / Sangeetha Sai as Vasundhra Devi Karthikeyan: Karthik's wife; Adhi's sister and Chandrakala's daughter (2021–2023)/(2023–2024).
- KPY Yogi as Namachivayam: Thamizh's best friend (2021–2024).
- Lavanya Manickam / Asritha Sreedas as Raagini: Kodhai and Natesan's daughter; Thamizh and Karthik's younger sister; Arjun's wife.(2021–2022)/(2022–2024).
- Pop Suresh as Paraman: Jayanthi’s husband
- Babitha Jose as Lakshmi: Arjun and Jayanthi's mother (2022–2024).
- Swathika Senthilkumar as Jayanthi: Lakshmi’s daughter; Paraman's wife; Arjun's elder sister
- Kayal Vizhi / Anbarasi as Abitha (Abi): Kothai's friend
- Akshitha Bopaiah as Meghna: An arrogant businesswoman and Thamizh's business partner and friend also who one-sidedly loves him, unaware that he is married (2023–2024) (Dead).
- Ashok Pandian as Kalivaradhan: Madhan's father, a greedy individual who wants to claim Meghna's properties using Thamizh to lure her in love (2023–2024).
- Mohammed Salmaan as Madhan: Kalivaradhan's son, wants to marry Meghna, and follows in his father's footsteps (2023–2024).
- Rekha Krishnappa as Chandrakala Devi: Vasundhara and Aditya's mother (2021–2023).
- Syed Saif as Adithya (Adhi): Chandrakala's son and Vasundhara's elder brother; and not related to Ragani
- Prabhakaran Chandran as Chokkalingam: Meenakshi's son, Vasuki's husband, Saraswathi, Arunprasad and Kavyapriya's father (2021–2024)
- Anitha Venkat as Vasuki Chokkalingam: Chokkalingam's wife, Saraswathi, Arunprasad and Kavyapriya's mother (2021–2023)
- A. Revathy as Meenakshi: Chokkalingam's mother (2021–2024)
- Madhan Pandian as Arunprasad Chokkalingam: Chokkalingam and Vasuki's son, Saraswathi's younger brother and Kavyapriya's elder brother (2021–2023)
- Sangeetha/Kokila Gopal as Kavyapriya Chokkalingam: Chokkalingam and Vasuki's younger daughter, Saraswathi and Arunprasad younger sister (2021–2022)/(2022–2023)
- Uma Maheswari as Minnal: Saraswathi's best friend (2021–2022)
- Mercy Leyal as Geetha Manickam: Tamizh's aunt (2021–2023)
- Ganesh as Manickam: Kothai's elder brother (2021–2023)
- Madhumitha Srinivas / Sailu Imran as Madhumita: Geetha's daughter (2021–2022)/(2022–2023)
- Srini as Elango: Arjun's friend (2022)
- Radhika Menon: Minnal's mother (2021)
- Yamini Saravanan: Raagini's friend (2022)
- Shalini as Nisha (2022)
- Ashok Kumar as Ravi: The owner of the mechanic shop who gives Saraswathi her mechanic job. (2023)

=== Sirappu Mega Sangamam Pandian Stores ===
- Stalin Muthu as Sathyamoorthy aka Moorthy – Lakshmi and Pandian's eldest son; Jeeva, Kathir and Kannan's brother; Dhanam's husband; Lakshmana Pandian's father (2021)
- Sujitha as Dhanalakshmi aka Dhanam – Varadarajan and Kamakshi's daughter; Jaga's sister; Moorthy's wife; Lakshmana Pandian's mother (2021).
- Venkat Renganathan as Jeevanandham aka Jeeva – Lakshmi and Pandian's second son; Moorthy, Kathir and Kannan's brother; Meena's husband; Kayal's father (2021)
- Hema Rajkumar as Meenatchi aka Meena – Janarthanan's elder daughter; Jeeva's wife; Kayal's mother (2021)
- Kumaran Thangarajan as Kathiravan aka Kathir – Lakshmi and Pandian's third son; Moorthy, Jeeva and Kannan's brother; Mullai's husband (2021)
- Kaavya Arivumani as Mullai Kathiravan - Muruganandham and Parvathy's younger daughter; Malli's sister; Kathir's wife (2021)

=== Cameos ===
- K. S. Suchitra Shetty as Baakiyalakshmi (2021)
- Sushma Nair as Suhasini Gunasekaran (2021)
- VJ Thara as Lavanya Gunasekaran (2021)
- Devi Teju as Lakshmi Gunasekaran (2021)
- Reshma as Arjun and Jeyanthi's elder sister (photographic appearance) (2022)
- Venkatesh as Arjun and Jeyanthi's father (photographic appearance) (2022)
- Lollu Sabha Palaniappan as Selvam: He helped Tamizh to save Saraswathi (2024)

== Crossovers and special episodes ==
- It had a crossover with Pandian Stores from 15 November to 28 November 2021.

== Production ==
=== Development ===
The show was produced by Vikatan Televistas. It was supposed to premiere in May 2021 but was postponed as shootings were halted due to the COVID-19 pandemic in India and subsequent lockdown. The first promo was released on 24 June 2021.

=== Casting ===
Deepak Dinkar who commonly joined with S.Kumaran's projects such as Thendral and Thirumathi Selvam where reprising his role and making his come back. Actress Nakshatra Nagesh was cast as the female lead Saraswathi.

In May 2023, Dharshana Golecha who played Vasundhara quit the series, VJ Sangeetha was cast in play the role of Vasundhara. Actress Rekha Krishnappa was cast to play Vasundhara and Aditya's mother as Chandrakala Devi. In October 2023, Akshitha Bopaiah and Salman were cast as Megna and Mathan.

=== Reception ===
In May 2022, The Times of India reported that the series ranked tenth in Tamil television ratings.

In April 2024, The Times of India reported that the series would end later that month.
