= Nayagi (TV series) =

Indian Tamil-language soap opera

- Season 2
- Genre: Family drama
- Created by: S. Kumaran
- Written by: Nandhan Shridharan; S. Marudhu Sankar; Madhumitha
- Screenplay by: V. K. Amirtharaj; C. U. Muthuselvan
- Directed by: S. Kumaran
- Creative director: B. Srinivasan
- Starring: Vijayalakshmi; Vidya Pradeep; Papri Ghosh; Ambika; Nakshatra Nagesh
- Theme music composer: C. Sathya
- Opening theme: "Vaa Vaa Sandhoshamaa"
- Country of origin: India
- Original language: Tamil
- No. of seasons: 2
- No. of episodes: 718

Production
- Producer: B. Srinivasan
- Cinematography: S. T. Martz; R. Bala Gurunathan
- Camera setup: Multi-camera
- Running time: 19–22 minutes
- Production company: Vikatan Televistas Pvt Ltd

Original release
- Network: Sun TV (2018-2020) re-telecast Kalaignar TV (2021-2022)
- Release: 19 February 2018 – 31 October 2020

Nayagi (transl. Leading women) is a 2018 Indian Tamil-language family drama series. It premiered on 19 February 2018 on Sun TV, replacing Deivamagal, and was replaced by Anbe Vaa and it ended on 31 October 2020. The show was produced by Vikatan Televistas Pvt Ltd and directed by S Kumaran. Nayagi was also re-aired on Kalaignar TV from 1 March 2021 to 9 July 2022.

Nayagi's first season revolves around Anandhi, heir apparent to a business empire but separated at birth from her parents who were killed treacherously by their aide Kalivardhan. The first season of the show initially starred Vijayalakshmi (who later replaced by Vidya Pradeep) in the titular role with Dhilip Rayan, Ambika, Papri Ghosh, Suresh Krishnamurthi, Meera Krishna, Sushma Nair, Vetri Velan and others.

The second season's story mainly revolves around Prakash who is a kind-hearted and amusing man. Divya, a strong and resilient woman, is the breadwinner of her family. The second season of this show starred Nakshatra Nagesh with Krishna reprising his role as Prakash (as previously played in Deivamagal) along with Arvind Khatare, Suhasini, Apollo Ravi reprising their comic roles and Ashok Kumar reprising as Krishna's friend Ashok as previously portrayed in Deivamagal. While Ambika, Papri Ghosh and Vetri Velan in other pivotal roles.

== Plot ==
=== Season 1 ===
Anandhi is a middle-class woman who is the secret and estranged heir of a rich couple. She lives with her adoptive father, Kathiresan and foster brother Muthukumar. She loves and marries Thirumurugan "Thiru", son of the Kalivaradan, who killed Anandhi's biological father and took his property. Kalivardan had kept Anandhi's biological mother, Leelavathi, alive and hidden. Thiru's childhood friend, Ananya is Anandhi's half-cousin, whose mother is the half-sister of Leelavathi. Ananya wants to marry Thiru to obtain the property.

Thiru's mother Vasanthi's sister, Sargunam is a woman who gives usury to her people. She has three children, Chezhiyan, Gopinath and Meghala. Chezhiyan marries Anandhi's best friend, Kanmani, opposing his mother. Sargunam helps Anandhi to live happily as Kalivaradan helps Ananya to get property. Meanwhile, Thiru, Anandhi and Vasanthi save Leelavathi from Kalivaradan. Anandhi takes care of Leelavathi in her home without knowing their real relation.

Later, it is revealed that Anandhi is the Leelavathi's daughter and the heir of property. Seeing the true colors of Kalivaradan, Thiru breaks all ties with him. Ananya fakes her death and frames Anandhi, who is arrested. Thiru bails out Anandhi and exposes Ananya, who is sentenced for 7 years.

Anandhi and Thiru live with their daughter, Yazhini. Ananya is still in jail and has a son, Akilan who born to Ananya and Thiru illegally through IVF without Thiru's knowledge. Yazhini and Akilan become best friends without knowing their truth. Ananya returns and uses Akilan as a weapon to join Thiru. Anandhi doubts about Akilan because his behavior is like Thiru. Soon, Thiru finds out that Akilan is his and Ananya's son and gets his custody with Anandhi's help.

Thiru's sister, Anupriya aka Anu returns to India. Her marriage is fixed to her fiancé, Mithran. Thiru and Anandhi fixes Ananya's marriage with Thiru's friend, Karthik. Anu marries Mithran while Ananya manages to cancel her marriage with Karthik. Later, She brainwashes Mithran who later mistreats Kathiresan. Ananya destroys Anandhi's business by some fake agreements. But she is exposed and imprisoned along with Kalivardhan and Duraiyarasan. Anandhi receives another deal to export their products out of India for the first time. Her business becomes successful, and tours to Singapore with their kids for their business.

=== Season 2 ===
Prakash travels to Chennai from his home town Thenkasi to get a banking job, but Divya, the sole wage earner of her family, gets that job. Meanwhile, in the Koothapiran–Sargunam family, Kanmani and Chezhiyan are made to leave the house by Gopi's evil plans and he also plans to control Sargunam and her wealth. Meghala and her husband Maran try to convince Sargunam but Gopi makes Sargunam to exclude them too. After chasing his two siblings, Gopi plans to take Kanmani's councillor posting but it fails. Later, Kanmani becomes pregnant and her problem are solved. Next, Coming to Prakash's track, He loses everything with Divya and later Divya's brother-in-law Aatralarasan. However, Pity Prakash came to Divya's home with Aatralasan. After his visit, the house became happy. Then, Divya falls in love with Prakash. She sacrificed her job opportunity for Prakash.

There, Rajalakshmi, owner of that company is the original mother of Prakash and she lost him when he was younger and ended up in the hands of his adoptive mother Sakunthala. Now, Aakash, Rajalakshmi's second son loves Divya and she had proposal his son with Divya. Prakash also gives up his love on Divya because she would get a rich life. But Prakash learns that Aakash is a psycho and he is not at all good for Divya's life. Then, he plans to stop the marriage but Aakash kidnaps Prakash and blackmails Divya to marry him. Prakash later escapes and Aakash kidnaps Divya's younger sister Savitha to blackmail her. Eventually even Savitha is rescued. Meanwhile, in Sargunam-Koothapiran family, Gopi tries to poison Sargunam but Kanmani drinks it and is sent to the hospital. Sargunam learns that Gopi is evil and that he tried to kill her and sends him to jail. She accepts Kanmani and Chezhiyan and brings them back into her house, and they are happy. Prakash and his friend Ashok come in the form of two priests and enter Rajalakshmi's house where the wedding is happening. When Divya is about to marry Akash, Prakash reveals his disguise and suddenly marries Divya while Aakash is pulled to side with a knife on his neck by Ashok. Rajalakshmi, furious that her son's marriage was ruined, grabs a gun and is about to shoot Prakash, and then her elder brother reveals that Ezhilan is actually her son Prakash and that he stole Prakash and gave him to one of their employees to raise as revenge for her humiliating him years ago. Rajalakshmi forgives Prakash and begins to love him. Akash also improves and lets Divya and Prakash live a happy married life and accepts Prakash as his brother.

== Cast ==
=== Main cast ===
- Vijayalakshmi / Vidya Pradeep as Anandhi Thirumurugan: Leelavathi's biological daughter; (2018) / (Aug.2018–Mar.2020)
- Dhilip Rayan as Thirumurugan "Thiru" Kalivardhan: Vasanthi and Kalivardhan's son; (2018–Mar.2020)
- Ambika as Sargunam Koothapiran: A businesswoman; Vasanthi's sister; (2018–Oct.2020)
- Nakshathra Nagesh as Divyalakshmi "Divya" Prakash: Geeta and Savitha's sister; (Jul.2020–Oct.2020)
- Krishna as Prakash aka Ezhilan: Rajalakshmi's elder son; (Jul.2020–Oct.2020)

=== Recurring ===
- Papri Ghosh as Kanmani Chezhiyan: Sigamani and Sarala's elder daughter; (2018–Oct.2020)
- Vetrivel as Chezhiyan Koothapiran: Sargunam and Koothapiran's elder son; (2018–Oct.2020)
- Meera Krishna as Vasanthi Kalivaradhan: Sargunam's sister; Kalivaradhan's wife; (2018–Jul.2020)
- Suresh Krishnamurthi as Kalivaradhan: Duraiyarasan's best friend; (2018–Jul.2020)
- Archana Lakshmi Narasimha Swamy / Koli Ramya / Sushma Nair as Ananya Duraiyarasan: Duraiyarasan and Kalyani's daughter; (2018) / (Sept.2018–Dec.2018) / (Jan.2019–Mar.2020)
- Devi Teju as Leelavathi: Kalyani's half-sister; Anandhi's mother; Yazhini's grandmother (2018–Jul.2020)
- Mirudhula Shree as Yazhini Thirumurugan: Anandhi and Thiru's daughter; (Oct.2019–Mar.2020)
- Jashik Ja as Akilan Thirumurugan: Ananya and Thiru's son; Anandhi's step-son; (Oct.2019–Mar.2020)
- Udumalai Ravi as Kathiresan: Muthu's father; Anandhi's adoptive father; (2018–Jul.2020)
- Senthilnathan as Koothapiran: Sargunam's husband; Chezhiyan, Gopi and Meghala's father; (2018–Oct.2020)
- Yogesh Venugopal as Gopinath "Gopi" Koothapiran: Sargunam and Koothapiran's younger son; (2018–Oct.2020)
- Ashok Pandian as Minister Duraiyarasan: Kalivaradhan's best friend; Kalyani's husband; Ananya's father; Akilan's grandfather (2018–Jul.2020)
- Meerabhi / Mercy Leyal as Kalyani Duraiyarasan: Leelavati's half-sister; Duraiyarasan's wife; Ananya's mother; Akilan's grandmother (2018–Jul.2020)
- Pradeepa Muthu / Shimona James as Anupriya "Anu" Mithran: Vasanthi and Kalivaradhan's daughter; Thiru's sister; Chezhiyan, Gopi and Megala's cousin; Mithran's wife (2018–2019) / (2019–Jul.2020)
- Ganesh as Sigamani: Sarala's husband; Kanmani and Malarvizhi's father (2018–Oct.2020)
- Aarthi Ramkumar as Rajalakshmi: Prakash and Akash's mother (Jul.2020–Oct.2020)
- Vijith as Akash: Rajalakshmi's younger son; Prakash's brother; Divya ex-fiancé. (Jul.2020-Oct.2020)
- Elakiya Jayakumar as Sumathi Gopinath: Gopi's wife; Varsha's mother. (2018–Oct.2020)
- Baby Aazhiya as Varsha Gopinath: Sumathi and Gopi's daughter; Yazhini and Akilan's cousin (Oct.2019–Oct.2020)
- Dhakshana as Meghala Maaran: Sargunam and Koothapiran's daughter; Chezhiyan and Gopinath's sister; Thiru and Anu's cousin; Maaran's wife (2018–Oct.2020)
- Suhasini / Akalya Venkatesan as Geetha Aatral: Divya and Savitha's sister; Aatral's wife (Jul.2020-Oct.2020)
- Arvind Kathare as Aatral Arasan: Geetha's husband (Jul.2020-Oct.2020)
- Giridhar Thirumalachary as Perumal: Kalivardhan's personal assistant (2018–Jul.2020)
- Padine Kumar as Shalini: Divya's best friend; Ashok's wife (2020)
- Ashok Kumar as Ashok: Prakash's best friend; Shalini's husband (2020)
- Ajay Kumar as Muthukumar "Muthu" Kathiresan: Kathiresan's son; Anandhi's adopted brother. (2018–Sept.2019)
- Raghul Kanagaraj as Mithran Kumar: Anu's husband (2019–Jul.2020)
- Ranjith Babu as Maaran Sethuraman: Sethuraman's son; Meghala's husband (2018–Oct.2020)
- Kavi Rajini as Sethuraman: Sargunam's rival; Maaran's father (2019-2020)
- Vaishnavi Sundar as Savitha: Geetha and Divya's sister (2020)
- Praveena / Suchitra as Sarala Sigamani: Sigamani's wife; Kanmani and Malarvizhi's mother (2018–Oct.2020)
- Vishnupriya / Srinisha Jayswal as Malarvizhi Sigamani: Sigamani and Sarala's younger daughter; Kanmani's sister (2018–Oct.2020)
- Sowmiya Ravindran as Suhasini: Cheziyan's ex-fiancée (2018–Mar.2020)
- Krishna Kumar as Venkat: Rajalakshmi's brother; Shreya's father (2020)
- Shruti Shivanagowda as Shreya Venkat: Venkat's daughter; Prakash and Akash's cousin (2020)
- Mukesh Kanna as Vishwa: Rajalakshmi's niece (2020)
- Sasikala Shree as Aatral's mother (2020)
- Ravi as Nesamani: Aatral's sidekick (2020)
- Yuvasree as Sakunthala: Prakash's adoptive mother; Amuda and Karna's mother (2020)
- Lavanya Manickam as Amuda: Sakunthala's daughter; Prakash's adopted sister; Karna's sister (2020)
- Tarun Appasamy as Karna: Sakunthala's son; Prakash's adopted brother; Amuda's brother (2020)
- Sanjay Shah as Guruji (2018–2020)
- Lingesh Shank as Karthik: Thiru's friend; Ananya's groom (2020)
- Raja Senthil as Karthik's father (2020)
- Uma Rani as Karthik's mother (2020)
- Devankumar as Ranjith: Anandhi's rival (2018–2019)

== Production ==
=== Development ===
Due to COVID-19 outbreak in India, the production was halted in mid March 2020, Nayagi was put on hiatus on Wednesday 3 April 2020 when the remaining episodes aired. Post COVID-19 break, the production resumed in July 2020 and new episodes started to telecast from 27 June 2020. During which, the story had a change in leads and story with a new season along with many new additions starring Krishna and Nakshathra Nagesh while former lead characters Thiru, Anandhi and their family's track being ended abruptly, while Sargunam and Kanmani's family track continued. The second season of the series began on 27 July 2020 and the series was off aired on 31 October 2020 due to drastic decline of ratings post COVID-19 break.

=== Casting ===
Actress Vidya Pradeep was selected to portray the role of Anandhi after the exit of Vijayalakshmi. Sun TV Anchor Dhilip Rayan was cast in the lead male role of Thirumurugan. They made their debuts with the series. Actress Ambika was selected to portray the role of Sarkunam, making a comeback after previously acting in the serial Sare Gama Gama Gama (2013–2014). Malayalam Actress Meera Krishnan was selected to play Vasanthi, after having appeared in director Thiruselvam Tamil serial Pokkisham (2012–2013).

== Reception ==
Until before COVID-19 break in March 2020, the series used to be one of the top five Tamil television programs consistently. In week 52 of 2018, it was at second position with 10.515 million impressions. In first two weeks of January 2019, it garnered 10.606 and 10.467 million impressions maintaining its second position. In week 49 of 2019, it maintains its second position with 10.099 million impressions. However when the series resumed its airing post Covid-19 break with the change in its story, main lead and time slot from 8:00 pm (IST) to 9:00 pm (IST), in July 2020, the ratings of the series had a drastic drop and it was off aired in October 2020.

== Adaptations ==
Language	Title	Premiere date	Network(s)	Last aired	Notes
Kannada	Nayaki ನಾಯಕಿ	17 June 2019	Sun Udaya	9 April 2020	Remake
Telugu	Bhagyarekha భాగ్యరేఖ	24 June 2019	Sun Gemini	6 November 2021	Remake
Marathi	Nashibvan नशीबवान	15 September 2025	Star Pravah	25 April 2026	Remake
