= Bigg Boss (Tamil TV series) season 7 =

Tamil TV show season

Bigg Boss
- Season 7
- Bigg Boss Season 7
- Presented by: Kamal Haasan
- No. of days: 105
- No. of housemates: 23
- Winner: Archana Ravichandran
- Runner-up: Manichandra
- No. of episodes: 106

Release
- Original network: Star Vijay; Disney+ Hotstar
- Original release: 1 October 2023 – 14 January 2024

Season chronology
- ← Previous; Season 6 Next → Season 8

Bigg Boss 7 is the seventh season of the Tamil-Indian reality television series of Bigg Boss, launched on Star Vijay and digitally streamed on Disney+ Hotstar from 1 October 2023. Kamal Haasan hosted the show for the seventh time. This was the last season for Kamal Haasan as a host for the series franchise.

The Grand Finale of the show took place on 14 January 2024, Archana Ravichandran was the first wild card entrant to emerge as the winner in the TV franchise of Bigg Boss (excluding the Hindi digital spin-off known as Bigg Boss OTT 2). Manichandra was the runner-up.

== Production ==
=== Eye logo ===
The eye logo was officially released on 18 August 2023. The logo of the season was shaped in an oval kind of manner with a full bronze/gold iris and dark grey designs in the eye.

=== House themes ===
The house was once again located in EVP Film City, Chennai, for the eighth time, including the Bigg Boss Ultimate (season 1) series, which was located in EVP. During the launch promo, it was said that this season will contain "Two Separate Houses".

==== Luxury house ====
The main (luxury) house looked much different than the previous season's house. This time the theme was fantasy land and there were bright and sweet colour shades such as pink, purple, light blue and magenta shades.

Rooms/Areas in the house included:

- confession room
- dining room
- storeroom
- massive, shared bedroom
- living area
- bathroom
- jail
- garden area
- smoke corners

==== Small house ====
The "Small House" or "chinna veedu" was revealed on the launch day. On Day 1, the house captain selected six housemates from the main house to be shifted to the Small House following a task. Contestants had to accomplish certain assignments to re-enter the main house.

Rooms/Areas in the side house included:

- a small confession room
- kitchen
- single/shared bedroom consisting of four beds
- couches have been replaced with floor mats
- glass to see through the main house
- small outdoor sitting area

=== Concept ===
The concept for this season of Bigg Boss was "Rendula Onnu Paakkalaam", which means the audience would be able to see double entertainment.

=== Teaser ===
Star Vijay officially released the "Sneak Peek Teaser" on 18 August 2023 featuring actor Kamal Haasan as the host for the seventh time in the series. The launch promo of the season was released on 25 August 2023. The second promo was released on 1 September 2023, the expected third promo was released on 15 September 2023, with a launch date of 1 October 2023.

=== Voting process ===
The host Kamal Haasan and television network Star Vijay had informed the audience that only one vote can be made through the Disney+ Hotstar app (per account) and missed call (per mobile number) unlike earlier where users were allowed to make ten votes per Disney + Hostar account and per phone number.

=== Release ===
The season was officially debuted on 1 October 2023 on Star Vijay, with Haasan returning as the host for the seventh time in the franchise.

== Housemate status ==
No	Housemates	Day entered	Day exited	Status
1	Archana	Day 28	Day 105	Winner
2	Manichandra	Day 1	Day 105	1st Runner-up
3	Maya	Day 1	Day 105	2nd Runner-up
4	Dinesh	Day 28	Day 105	3rd Runner-up
5	Vishnu	Day 1	Day 105	4th Runner-up
6	Vijay	Day 1	Day 21	Evicted
6	Vijay	Day 56	Day 103	Evicted
7	Vichitra	Day 1	Day 98	Evicted
8	Poornima	Day 1	Day 96	Walked with ₹16L
9	Raveena	Day 1	Day 91	Evicted
10	Nixen	Day 1	Day 91	Evicted
11	Vickram	Day 1	Day 84	Evicted
12	Suresh	Day 1	Day 76	Evicted
13	Ananya	Day 1	Day 7	Evicted
13	Ananya	Day 56	Day 74	Evicted
14	Jovika	Day 1	Day 63	Evicted
15	Akshaya	Day 1	Day 56	Evicted
16	Bravo	Day 28	Day 55	Evicted
17	Gana	Day 28	Day 49	Evicted
18	Aishu	Day 1	Day 42	Evicted
19	Anna Bharathi	Day 28	Day 35	Evicted
20	Pradeep	Day 1	Day 34	Ejected
21	Vinusha	Day 1	Day 28	Evicted
22	Yugendran	Day 1	Day 28	Evicted
23	Bava	Day 1	Day 7	Walked

== Housemates ==
Entry of housemates into the house:

=== Original entrants ===
1. Cool Suresh, a film and television actor.
2. Poornima Ravi, an actress and YouTuber known for her YouTube channel Araathi and her role in the film Plan Panni Pannanum and Annapoorani.
3. Raveena Daha, a film and television actress who had a lead role in the TV serial Mouna Raagam 2.
4. Pradeep Antony, an actor known for his roles in the films Aruvi, Vaazhl and Dada.
5. Nixen, a rapper, lyricist and actor.
6. Manichandra, a dancer and choreographer
7. Jovika Vijayakumar, a social media influencer and star kid, elder daughter of Season 3 and Bigg Boss Ultimate contestant Vanitha Vijayakumar.
8. Akshaya Udayakumar, an actress who appeared in the film Love Today.
9. Vinusha Devi, an actress and model who played the titular character in the TV serial Bharathi Kannamma and also played the lead role in the sequel Bharathi Kannamma 2.
10. Aishu ADS, a dancer and social media influencer.
11. Vishnu, a television and film actor who played the lead role in the TV serials Office, Sathya and its sequel Sathya 2.
12. Maya S. Krishnan, a theatre and film actress, model and singer who appeared in films such as Vaanavil Vaazhkai, Thodari, Vikram and Leo.
13. Saravana Vickram, a television actor who played the role of Kannan in the first season of the TV serial Pandian Stores.
14. Yugendran, a playback singer and YouTuber known for his roles in the films Poovellam Un Vaasam, Bagavathi and Thirupaachi. He is the son of the playback singer Malaysia Vasudevan.
15. Vichithra, a former film and television actress who appeared in the films Thalaivasal, Rasigan, Muthu and Villadhi Villain and participated in the comedy-based cooking show, Cooku with Comali (season 4).
16. Bava Chelladurai, a Tamil writer, storyteller, activist and actor who appeared in the films Naadodigal 2, Walter and Jai Bhim
17. Ananya Rao, a television personality and model, who appeared in Netflix India's original IRL - In Real Love.
18. Vijay Varma, a dancer and model who has appeared in various dance reality shows and films including Thalaivaa as a backup dancer.

=== Wildcard entrants ===
1. Dinesh Gopalsamy, a television actor known for his roles in television series such as Poove Poochudava, Nachiyarpuram and Kizhakku Vaasal. He is the estranged husband of Season 6 contestant Rachitha Mahalakshmi.
2. Anna Bharathi, an actress, comedy artist, and social media influencer known for her standup comedies and debate shows.
3. Archana Ravichandran, a video jockey, a television personality and television actress known for her role as Archana in the television serial Raja Rani 2.
4. RJ Bravo, a radio jockey, social media influencer and entrepreneur who has hosted radio programs in the UAE.
5. Gana Bala, a playback singer and actor who predominantly sings Tamil movie songs belonging to the Gaana genre of Tamil Nadu.

== Twists ==
=== Launch day captaincy ===
On launch day, each housemate must convince the others that he or she deserves to become the captain of Week 1. The winner of this verbal battle becomes the captain for Week 1.

=== Star medal ===
In this season, the best performers of weekly tasks will be awarded a star medal. The housemate who collects five star medals can use it as an eviction free pass to escape from eviction. This pass is only valid till Week 10.

=== Cursed Stone (Sabakkal) ===
On Day 17, Bigg Boss revealed a new twist called "Sabakkal" (which is Cursed Stone). The housemates need to vote for someone from Bigg Boss House to receive this cursed stone. The housemate receiving this stone will be sent to Small Boss House and will be directly nominated for Week 4. However, this stone will not remain with the same person as it will switch to another housemate given by the one holding the stone until the Bigg Boss announces the final person to move to another house.

=== Earthquake (Boogambam) ===
On Day 50, Bigg Boss announced that each housemate must complete three tasks in order to prevent three wildcard contestants from entering the house. The wildcard contestants pending to enter are former housemates who were evicted from the house earlier in the season. Each failed task will result in one wildcard contestant entering the house and each completed task will prevent one wildcard contestant from entering the house.

Tasks	Result	Wildcard entry	Entrants
Task 1	Failed	Confirmed	Ananya Rao
Task 2	Passed	Blocked	
Task 3	Failed	Confirmed	Vijay Varma

== Main House vs. Small House ==
=== Introduction of Small Boss house ===
For the first time in the history of Bigg Boss Tamil, this season has two houses: Bigg Boss house and Small Boss house. The following rules have to be obeyed in the respective houses.

1. Every week, members of the Small Boss house will be nominated by the captain. The nominated members have to be inside the Small House for that whole week and are expected to not leave that house for any reason.
2. The Small House is controlled by "Chinna Boss" (Small Boss). They cannot listen to the voice of Big Boss.
3. Housemates in the main house need to nominate housemates from the Small House for eviction process and Small House members need to nominate Bigg Boss housemates for eviction.
4. House activities for every week including Cooking and Vessel Washing should only be done by Small House members. House cleaning and bathroom cleaning for every week will be decided based on the tasks given by Big Boss. The losers of these tasks should perform those activities.
5. Weekly tasks and all other tasks must only be done by Big Boss members; Small House members cannot participate in any task given by Bigg Boss.
6. Daily menu for cooking will be decided by Bigg Boss housemates and will be put up in board, Small house members have to cook accordingly from the ration provided to them. They have no rights to change the menu.
7. Unlike previous seasons, house rations have to be acquired by shopping in Bigg Boss market and the bill amount has to repaid by various Shopping Repayment Tasks.

Housemates in the Small House are expected to not leave that house for any reason. If they fail to follow instructions, they will face consequences in their stay at the Bigg Boss House. The Small House is controlled by Chinna Boss (Small Boss).

=== Chinna Boss ===
Unlike previous seasons, where a single main voice, the Bigg Boss, controlled the whole house, this season "Chinna Boss" has been introduced to be the main voice for housemates in the Small House. Housemates in the side house will only follow orders given by Chinna Boss and will not hear the voice of Bigg Boss like the housemates in the Bigg House.

=== Housemate allotment ===
Housemate	Launch Day	Week 1		Week 2	Week 3	Week 4		Week 5		Week 6	Week 7	Week 8	Week 9	Week 10	Week 11	Week 12	Week 13	Week 14	Week 15
Housemate	Launch Day	Day 1	Day 2	Week 2	Week 3	Week 4		Week 5		Week 6	Week 7	Week 8	Week 9	Week 10	Week 11	Week 12	Week 13	Week 14	Week 15
Archana							Main House ↔	Small House ↓			Main House ↑		Small House ↓	Main House ↑		Small House ↓	Main House ↑		No allotment
Manichandra	Main House ↔					Small House ↓		Main House ↑		Small House ↓	Main House ↑						Small House ↓		No allotment
Maya	Main House ↔			Small House ↓		Main House ↑									Small House ↓		Main House ↑		No allotment
Dinesh							Main House ↔	Small House ↓			Main House ↑				Small House ↓		Main House ↑	Small House ↓	No allotment
Vishnu	Main House ↔			Small House ↓		Main House ↑						Small House ↓		Main House ↑			Small House ↓		No allotment
Vijay	Main House ↔			Small House ↓	Main House ↑								Small House ↓		Main House ↑	Small House ↓	Main House ↑	Small House ↓	No allotment
Vichithra	Main House ↔		Small House ↓	Main House ↑				Small House ↓			Main House ↑	Small House ↓	Main House ↑		Small House ↓	Main House ↑	Small House ↓	Main House ↑	
Poornima	Main House ↔				Small House ↓	Main House ↑						Small House ↓			Main House ↑	Small House ↓	Main House ↑		
Nixen	Main House ↔	Small House ↓		Main House ↑		Small House ↓		Main House ↑						Small House ↓	Main House ↑	Small House ↓	Main House ↑		
Raveena	Main House ↔	Small House ↓		Main House ↑						Small House ↓	Main House ↑			Small House ↓		Main House ↑	Small House ↓		
Vickram	Main House ↔				Small House ↓	Main House ↑						Small House ↓				Main House ↑			
Suresh	Main House ↔			Small House ↓	Main House ↑					Small House ↓	Main House ↑		Small House ↓	Main House ↑	Small House ↓				
Ananya	Main House ↔	Small House ↓											Main House ↑	Small House ↓	Main House ↑				
Jovika	Main House ↔					Small House ↓		Main House ↑	Small House ↓	Main House ↑		Small House ↓	Main House ↑						
Akshaya	Main House ↔					Small House ↓		Main House ↑											
Bravo							Main House ↔	Small House ↓		Main House ↑		Small House ↓							
Bala							Main House ↔	Small House ↓		Main House ↑									
Aishu	Main House ↔	Small House ↓			Main House ↑														
Anna Bharathi	'						Main House ↔	Small House ↓											
Pradeep	Main House ↔			Small House ↓				Main House ↑											
Vinusha	Main House ↔	Small House ↓		Main House ↑	Small House ↓	Main House ↑													
Yugendran	Main House ↔		Small House ↓	Main House ↑		Small House ↓													
Bava	Main House ↔	Small House ↓																	

== Gold stars ==
Housemates individually receive a gold star from Bigg Boss if they complete a task outstandingly or with work and task ethic. The housemate with the most gold stars by Week 10 of the season will receive the special power to save themselves from the nomination process in any week they desire after Week 10, hence they will escape eviction for one week. Saravana Vickram had the most stars after Week 10 and was saved from Week 11 nominations. He was also given the power to directly nominate one contestant.

Housemates	Gold Stars Leaderboard
Archana	None
Dinesh	
Manichandra	
Maya	
Vichithra	
Vijay	
Vishnu	
Poornima	
Nixen	
Raveena	
Vickram	

== Bigg Boss Jail ==
Week	In jail		Day(s)
	None		
	None		
	None		
	None		
6	Akshaya		Day 39
10	Vishnu		Day 68
12	Vichithra	Archana	Day 82
	None		
	None		
	None		
	None		
	None		
	None		
	None		
	None		

Female housemates Male housemates

== Guest appearances ==
Week	Day	Guest(s)	Purpose of visit
Week 7	Day 43	Srushti Dange, Pugazh	Guests for Deepavali festival
Week 9	Days 57–58	Harish Kalyan	To promote their film Parking
Week 9	Day 58	Indhuja Ravichandran	To promote their film Parking
Week 9	Day 60	Selva Mani (Team Player), Raghu (Sports Guru), Muthu (Sports Commentator)	Tamil Thalaivas Pro Kabaddi Promotions
Week 12	Day 79	Poornima's mother (Usha), Archana's mother (Jayanthi) and father (Ravichandran), Vijay's mother (Krishnaveni), Vickram's mother (Sarojini) and father (Kathiresan)	As a part of the Freeze task
Week 12	Day 80	Archana's sister (Akshaya), Mani's mother (Sarala), Dinesh's father (Gopalsamy) and mother (Amsaveni), Nixen's father (Velayutham), Vishnu's sisters (Suhashini and Nivetha)	As a part of the Freeze task
Week 12	Day 81	Maya's mother (Geetha) and sister (Swagatha), Raveena's aunt (Sai Hemavathy) and brother (Rahul), Vickram's sister (Surya), Poornima's brother (Kishore) and niece (Danika), Mani's brother (Ram Prasad) and niece (Subiksha)	As a part of the Freeze task
Week 12	Day 82	Vijay's brother (Gokul), Nixen's friend (Sanjay), Vichithra's husband (Shaji) and sons (Roshan, Rohan and Rihan)	As a part of the Freeze task
Week 12	Day 82	Raveena's mother (Latha)	To surprise Raveena Daha during mid week eviction night Episode
Week 14	Day 96	Yuvan Mayilsamy and Ashwini S	To promote their upcoming Thangamagal serial
Week 14	Day 96	Navin Kumar, Nikitha Murali and Swetha	To promote their upcoming Chinna Marumagal serial
Week 15	Day 103	Arunraja Kamaraj	to promote the Label series
Week 15	Day 103	Malavika, Super Singer Mani & band	for celebrations
Week 15	Day 105	Coke Studio and Band	for celebrations
Week 15	Day 105	All the evicted contestants except Bava, Yugendran, Pradeep, Annabharathi and Aishu	to be a part of Grand Finale
Week 15	Day 105	Kamal Haasan	to provide gifts for the finalists

== Weekly summary ==
Week 1	Entrances	Suresh, Poornima, Raveena, Pradeep, Nixen, Nikitha, Vinusha, Manichandra, Akshaya, Jovika, Aishu, Vishnu, Maya, Vickram, Yugendran, Vichithra, Bava, Ananya and Vijay entered the Bigg Boss house on Day 1.
Week 1	Captaincy Task	On launch day, each housemate must convince the others that he or she deserves to become the captain of Week 1. The ultimate winner of this verbal battle becomes the captain for Week 1.
Week 1	House Captain	Vijay Varma
Week 1	Nominations	Aishu, Ananya, Nikitha, Chelladurai, Jovika, Pradeep, Raveena and Yugendran were nominated for the Week 1 nomination process.
Week 1	Weekly Task	Know Your Housemates: Two housemates debate against each other and speak their opinions on their popularity within the house. Fellow housemates listen to the housemates' speeches and decide who is verified (opinion supported) and who is blocked (opinion rejected); Conference task: Housemates can argue their issues with their fellow housemates and settle a conflict that has arisen during the week.
Week 1	House Activity Tasks	For House Cleaning: Two housemates (Jovika and Pradeep) from Bigg Boss house and two from the Small Boss house (Nixen and Ananya) had to participate in a puzzle to correctly organise the shuffled map of the Bigg Boss house. The losers of this task have to clean the house for the week.: Bigg Boss members (winners); Small house members (lost); For Bathroom Cleaning: 1 housemate from each house (Raveena and Vickram) participated in the quiz task about the Bigg Boss house. The losers of this task have to perform bathroom cleaning for the week.: Bigg Boss members (winners); Small house members (lost)
Week 1	Shopping Budget Tasks	Task 1-Weight party: Big Boss housemates have to stand on a weighing machine so that the total weight has to be equal to the weight displayed by the Big Boss. The winners of this task will have their makeup items saved.; Task 2: Big Boss housemates have to pass the electric rod through a puzzle board without touching it. Housemates who fail at this task will have all their clothing confiscated by the Big Boss.
Week 1	Jail	None
Week 1	Saved contestants	Aishu, Chelladurai, Jovika, Nikitha, Pradeep, Raveena and Yugendran were saved after facing a public vote.
Week 1	Exits	On Day 7, Ananya S Rao was evicted after facing public votes.
Week 2	Entrances	None
Week 2	Captaincy Task	Wrong Turn: Saravana Vickram, Jovika Vijayakumar and Nixen participated in the captaincy task. In this week's task, housemates must enter the maze in the activity area, collect the maximum gold stars inside it, and have to exit the maze within the stipulated time. The first to exit with maximum stars will be the captain for Week 2.
Week 2	Captaincy Task	Winner–Saravana Vickram
Week 2	Captaincy Task	Failed- Jovika
Week 2	Captaincy Task	Failed- Nixen
Week 2	House Captain	Saravana Vickram
Week 2	Nominations	Akshaya, Jovika, Nikitha, Maya, Poornima, Pradeep, Vichithra and Vishnu were nominated for the Week 2 nomination process
Week 2	House Activity Tasks	For House Cleaning: One housemate from each house (Akshaya and Vijay Varma) participated in this belief task. Housemates must arrange the cups in the table in a certain orientation also they should try to alter the opponent's orientation, too. The housemate whose orientation has more cups on the table is the winner. The losers of this task have to clean the house for the week.: Bigg Boss members (Lost); Small house members (Winners); Bigg Boss members (Lost); Small house members (Winners)
Week 2	Weekly Task	Each housemate has to debate how they are better than other housemates in entertaining the people and also about their contributions to the house and show for the past ten days.; After the debate, housemates have to vote to choose the winner of the star medal.
Week 2	Shopping Budget Tasks	Task 1-Chain Reaction: Five Big Boss housemates, Jovika, Manichandra, Nixen, Yugendran and Poornima, have to balance the given pieces of boxes horizontally between each of their hands for the given time period. Housemates who succeed at this task will retain their grooming and toiletry items.; Task 2-Mud Cycling: Five Big Boss housemates, Raveena, Manichandra, Nixen, Vinusha and Poornima, have to cycle through the ramp surrounded by clay in the activity area to get the flag within the buzzer. Four flags have to be acquired to win this task. Housemates who fail at this task will have all their clothing confiscated by the Big Boss.; Task 3-Aaryamala Aaryamala: Three Big Boss housemates, Raveena, Yugendran and Vichithra, participated in this mental stability task. All three of them must remain within the activity area till the buzzer, patiently listening to all the disturbances. If even one of them leaves the area before the buzzer, they fail. Housemates who win at this task will have food cooked by Small House members.
Week 2	Jail	None
Week 2	Saved contestants	Akshaya, Jovika, Maya, Poornima, Pradeep, Vichithra, Nikitha and Vishnu were saved. No eviction.
Week 2	Exits	On Day 8, Bava Chelladurai walked out of the house due to his poor health.
Week 3	Entrances	None
Week 3	Captaincy Task	Block Stacking three contestants nominated for the captaincy had to stack blocks by size from largest on the bottom and to the smallest on the top. Nominees are allowed to have another contestant help to build and stack the blocks. The housemate who successfully protects their stacked blocks from attacks will win the task.
Week 3	Captaincy Task	Winner– Yugendran
Week 3	Captaincy Task	Failed– Jovika
Week 3	Captaincy Task	Failed- Aishu
Week 3	House Captain	Yugendran
Week 3	Nominations	Akshaya, Aishu, Manichandra, Maya, Nixen, Poornima, Pradeep, Vichithra, Vikram, Nikitha, Vijay and Vinusha were nominated for the Week 3 Eviction Process.
Week 3	House Activity Tasks	For House Cleaning: One housemate from each house (Vishnu (Small Boss) and Manichandra (Bigg House)) will participate in this task. This is a task where the housemate needs to balance the ball in the middle of the tube. If they manage to balance the ball, that person is the winner. The losers of this task have to clean the house for the week. The result is Bigg House (Loss) and Small House (Winner).; For Bathroom Cleaning: One housemate from each house, (Pradeep (Small Boss) and Cool Suresh (Bigg House), will participate in this task. This task is where the housemates need to stack plates and cups like a tower in the water. If they manage to balance it out, they are declared the winners. The losers of this task have to clean the house for the week. The result is Bigg House (Winner) and Small House (Loss).
Week 3	Star Medal Task	Selected housemates had to talk about their life. The person who had the most touching story was given the Star Medal by the Small Boss house contestants.
Week 3	Weekly Task	Oru Kathai Sollatuma: The housemates of Bigg Boss House shared their past life, their sorrows, strengths, and how they achieved their dreams, with the other housemates. The other housemates have to paste a heart, like, or dislike sticker if the housemate's story was relatable, inspirational, or non-inspirational.; Oxygen Task: This task pitted Small House and Bigg House against each other. There are thirty oxygen tanks in the garden. The housemates must collect oxygen tanks in order to win each round. There were two rounds held, both of which were won by Bigg House, where they had the power to choose two contenders for captaincy and one direct nomination from Small House.
Week 3	Shopping Budget Tasks	Task 1: Code Red: The housemates (Aishu, Jovika, Raveena and Nixen) will see the video color sequence on the screen, and after that, they will show the row to cut the color wire. If successful, their repayment will succeed. If they lose, they have to surrender their clothing for the rest of the week. Only Raveena and Nixen won this task. Therefore, the housemates failed at this task.; Task 2: Ping Ball: The housemates (Raveena, Manichandra and Yugendran) have to complete the puzzle; however, they must throw the ball while completing the puzzle. If they lose the challenge, they would be unable to eat anything for the entire week. Since Raveena failed to catch the ball, the team failed.
Week 3	Jail	None
Week 3	Saved contestants	Akshaya, Aishu, Manichandra, Maya, Nixen, Poornima, Pradeep, Vichithra, Vikram, Nikitha and Vinusha were saved after facing the public.
Week 3	Exits	On Day 21, Vijay Varma was evicted after facing a public vote.
Week 4	Entrances	On Day 28, Dinesh Gopalsamy, Anna Bharathi, Archana Ravichandran, RJ Bravo and Gana Bala entered the Bigg Boss House as wildcard housemates.
Week 4	Captaincy Task	Captain Campaign: Each captain contender (Nixen, Poornima Ravi and Vijay Varma) must tell how they will run their captaincy and what to prove in the upcoming week. Then, other housemates must choose a number, which will be an OTP number, which contains a four-digit number. The housemates holding that number must decide who becomes captain after listening to the contenders' speeches.
Week 4	Captaincy Task	Winner– Poornima
Week 4	Captaincy Task	Failed– Vijay
Week 4	Captaincy Task	Failed– Nixen
Week 4	House Captain	Poornima
Week 4	Nominations	Akshaya, Jovika, Manichandra, Maya, Nixen, Nikitha, Pradeep, Suresh, Vickram, Vinusha, Vishnu and Yugendran were nominated for the Week 4 Eviction Process.
Week 4	House Activity Tasks	Football: The housemates (Manichandra and Vishnu) need to sit while playing football. If the housemates fail to kick the ball inside goalkeeping, which gives them points, the house with the most points wins. The Small House won and the Bigg House lost.; Clean The Teeth: The same housemates who played previously must also compete in the game. The housemates must clean their board teeth fully within the time. The results are that Small House lost and Bigg House won.
Week 4	Weekly Task	Battery Dead: All 15 housemates must participate in the task. Each housemate must take someone's phone to charge at the charging station. However, the housemates are unable to charge the phone, and the housemate who is on the phone will be removed from the task. This housemate who wins will receive two stars. Jovika won the task and received two stars with the help of Akshaya.; Likes or Dislikes: All 15 housemates must participate in the task. Each housemate needs to choose two housemates from the house, then they receive videos from the families or friends of the chosen housemates. After analyzing the video, the housemates must decide whether they dislike or like someone they choose. The housemates with the most likes will receive one star. Pradeep won the task and received one star.; Ranking: All 15 housemates must participate in this task. Each housemate must explain why they deserve the ranks they choose. The housemates will be ranked based on whether their peers found their presentation convincing.
Week 4	Shopping Budget Tasks	Pass The Board: One housemate from each house (Maya and Yugendran) must compete in this task. In this task, two housemates pass the blue and red board to each another within the time limit. If they manage to pass every board to the other person, they win. However, they failed in this task.; Memory Task: The housemates (Akshaya, Aishu and Vickram) need to compete in this task. In this task, housemates need to remember the card order they see on the screen. Then, the housemates need to put in the order of the card that was put out in the garden. The housemates failed in this task.
Week 4	Jail	None
Week 4	Saved contestants	Akshaya, Jovika, Manichandra, Maya, Nixen, Nikitha, Pradeep, Suresh, Vickram and Vishnu were saved from eviction.
Week 4	Exits	On Day 28, Yugendran Vasudevan and Vinusha Devi were evicted after facing a public vote.
Week 5	Entrances	None
Week 5	Captaincy Task	Feels the Reels: Poornima Ravi, Aishu ADS and Jovika Vijayakumar compete in a competition where each of them needs to tie cloth to make reels for cassette tape with the help of other housemates. The housemate with the longest tape wins the competition.
Week 5	Captaincy Task	Winner-Poornima
Week 5	Captaincy Task	Failed-Aishu
Week 5	Captaincy Task	Failed-Jovika
Week 5	House Captain	Poornima
Week 5	Nominations	Akshaya, Anna Bharathi, Archana, Aishu, Bala, Bravo, Dinesh, Manichandra, Nikitha, and Maya were nominated for the Week 5 Eviction Process.
Week 5	House Activity Tasks	Stick To Stick: Five housemates from each house need to hold the ball with a stick without covering it. If they are able to goal the ball, they win. The Bigg Boss House won with the most goals in this task.; Blow It: Six housemates from each house need to blow the ball to enter each horseshoe. If the housemates succeed, they win. The Bigg Boss House won again in the cleaning task.
Week 5	Weekly Task	Bell In The Head: Each housemate wears bell headgear. Each of them needs to stand still after the buzzer; if they move, that housemate will lose. The housemate who wins will receive one gold star. Vichithra won the Gold Star task.; BB Talent Show: The Bigg Boss House was divided into two teams, led by Maya (originally Pradeep) and Suresh. Each team provided solo, duet, and group performances, which were judged by the Small House. And for the first time, the audience was included to support. Suresh's team won, and Aishu and Raveena were named the best performers. Vichithra awarded Aishu a gold star.
Week 5	Shopping Budget Tasks	Hole In The Wall: Bigg Boss House will compete to repay their debt, which means each housemate needs to go through each wall if they are able to enter all the walls. The Bigg Boss House completed the task.
Week 5	Jail	Akshaya Udayakumar was sent to the jail.
Week 5	Saved contestants	Akshaya, Archana, Aishu, Bala, Bravo, Dinesh, Manichandra, Nikitha and Maya were saved from eviction.
Week 5	Exits	On Day 34, Pradeep Anthony was ejected with the Red Card. On Day 35, Anna Bharathi was evicted after facing a public vote.
Week 6	Entrances	None
Week 6	Captaincy Task	Basement Weak: Maya S.Krishnan, Cool Suresh and Vichithra have to stand still on one leg for a long time to win the competition.
Week 6	Captaincy Task	Winner–Maya
Week 6	Captaincy Task	Failed–Suresh
Week 6	Captaincy Task	Failed-Vichithra
Week 6	House Captain	Maya
Week 6	Nominations	Aishu, Archana, Bravo, Dinesh, Poornima and Vichithra were nominated for the Week 6 Eviction Process.
Week 6	House Activity Tasks	Kamal Haasan Birthday Task: All housemates dress as popular characters from the host's films. All housemates pair with another housemate and perform a dance.: Maya and Bala; Aishu and Nixen; Suresh and Vichithra; Vishnu and Poornima; Archana and Dinesh; Akshaya and Vickram; Raveena and Manichandra; Jovika and Bravo; Dinesh and Archana also were appointed as the judges for the dancing competition show, they both pressed the "outstanding performance" buzzer for Suresh and Vichithra. They both won 80,000 BB dollars.
Week 6	Weekly Task	Bigg Boss Court: Housemates select one housemate as a judge and another with whom they have had a conflict in the week to try to resolve the conflict.: Poornima VS Vishnu - Raveena (judge); Poornima VS Vichithra - Nixen (judge)
Week 6	Shopping Budget Tasks	Archana and Maya, who both did the luxury budget shopping for Week 6, were called to the confession room by Bigg Boss, and were asked what they bought and how much of the items they purchased from the BB grocery hall. Both Archana and Maya answered wrongly to most of the questions given by Bigg Boss and failed to repay the debt of the shopping. As a punishment, Bigg Boss demanded a housemate be sent to the jail from the main house, hence Vishnu was chosen after receiving the majority votes to be sent to jail.
Week 6	Jail	Vishnu Vijay was sent to the jail.
Week 6	Saved contestants	Archana, Bravo, Dinesh, Poornima and Vichithra were saved from eviction.
Week 6	Exits	On Day 42, Aishu ADS was evicted after facing a public vote.
Week 7	Entrances	None
Week 7	Captaincy Task	Rolling the wheel task: Captaincy-nominated housemates had a wheel with a ball inside of it, they had to spin it and cross over a ramp while spinning the ball without it falling off. The housemate who finishes the task first wins captaincy for Week 7.
Week 7	Captaincy Task	Winner–Dinesh
Week 7	Captaincy Task	Failed–Jovika
Week 7	Captaincy Task	Failed–Aishu
Week 7	House Captain	Dinesh
Week 7	Nominations	Akshaya, Bala, Bravo, Manichandra, Poornima, Raveena, Vichithra and Vickram were nominated for the Week 7 Eviction Process.
Week 7	House Activity Tasks	Deepavali Sweet Task: Housemates were given 45 pieces of Ladoo's and each housemate had to give 2 pieces to another 2 housemates with whom they had developed a strong connection. 3 of the 45 Ladoo's contained a golden star. Any housemate who received 2 stars was able to nominate 2 housemates for the Week 8 eviction process the following week.; Vichithra received 2 golden stars.; Manichandra received 1 golden star.
Week 7	Weekly Task	Unnai Pol Uruthaan: Each housemate imitated the behaviour, dress, and attitude of a housemate of the opposite sex throughout the week.; Housemate / Housemate mimicking; Akshaya / Bravo; Archana / Vickram; Bala / Akshaya; Bravo / Jovika; Jovika / Nixen; Manichandra / Poornima; Maya / Vishnu; Nixen / Vichithra; Poornima / Bala; Raveena / Manichandra; Suresh / Archana; Vichithra / Suresh; Vickram / Raveena; Vishnu / Maya; Since there were one more male than female housemates in the house, one male was exempted from the task. The majority of female housemates voted to exempt Dinesh.; So Dinesh became the judge and observed the housemates' imitations. He rated Bala's the worst, so Bala was eliminated from the task and replaced by Dinesh.; Dinesh Secret Task: Dinesh was called to the confession room and the Bigg Boss instructed him to argue with housemates, thereby provoking them to stop their imitations and revert to their usual behaviour.; Task assigned to / Task status; Dinesh / Passed; Dinesh succeeded in the task by provoking housemates to abandon their mimicry.
Week 7	Shopping Budget Tasks	None
Week 7	Jail	Vichithra Williams and Archana Ravichandran were sent to the jail.
Week 7	Saved contestants	Akshaya, Bravo, Manichandra, Poornima, Raveena, Vichithra and Vickram were saved from eviction.
Week 7	Exits	On Day 49, Gaana Bala was evicted after facing a public vote.
Week 8	Entrances	On Day 56, Vijay Varma and Ananya S Rao re-entered the Bigg Boss House as wildcard housemates.
Week 8	Captaincy Task	
Week 8	Captaincy Task	Winner–Dinesh
Week 8	Captaincy Task	Failed–Cool Suresh
Week 8	Captaincy Task	Failed–Nixen
Week 8	House Captain	Dinesh
Week 8	Nominations	Akshaya, Archana, Bravo, Manichandra, Maya, Poornima, Raveena and Vichithra were nominated for the Week 8 Eviction Process.
Week 8	Weekly Task	Earthquake (Boogambam) On Day 50, Bigg Boss announced that each housemate must complete three tasks in order to prevent three wildcard contestants from entering the house. The wildcard contestants pending to enter are former housemates who were evicted from the house earlier in the season. Each failed task will result in one wildcard contestant entering the house and each completed task will prevent one wildcard contestant from entering the house.: Tasks / Result / Wildcard Entry / Entrants; Task 1 / Failed / Confirmed / Vijay Varma; Task 2 / Passed / Blocked; Task 3 / Failed / Confirmed / Ananya S Rao; Ananya S Rao and Vijay Varma re-entered the house as wildcard contestants.
Week 8	House Activity Tasks	None
Week 8	Shopping Budget Tasks	None
Week 8	Jail	None
Week 8	Saved contestants	Archana, Manichandra, Maya, Poornima, Raveena and Vichithra were saved from eviction.
Week 8	Exits	On Day 55, RJ Bravo was evicted after facing a public vote. On Day 56, Akshaya Udayakumar was evicted after facing a public vote.
Week 9	Entrances	
Week 9	Captaincy Task	
Week 9	Captaincy Task	Winner– Nixen
Week 9	Captaincy Task	Failed– Jovika
Week 9	Captaincy Task	Failed- Vishnu
Week 9	House Captain	Nixen
Week 9	Nominations	Ananya, Suresh, Dinesh, Jovika, Manichandra, Nikitha, Poornima, Vichithra and Vickram were nominated for the Week 9 eviction process.
Week 9	House Activity Tasks	
Week 9	Weekly Task	
Week 9	Shopping Budget Tasks	
Week 9	Jail	None
Week 9	Saved contestants	Ananya, Dinesh, Manichandra, Poornima, Suresh, Vichithra and Vickram were saved from eviction.
Week 9	Exits	On Day 63, Jovika Vijayakumar and Nikitha Murali were evicted after facing a public vote.
Week 10	Entrances	None
Week 10	Captaincy Task	
Week 10	Captaincy Task	Winner– Vishnu
Week 10	Captaincy Task	Failed– Suresh
Week 10	Captaincy Task	Failed - Archana
Week 10	House Captain	Vishnu
Week 10	Nominations	Archana, Dinesh, Manichandra, Nixen and Vichithra were nominated for the Week 10 eviction process.
Week 10	House Activity Tasks	
Week 10	Weekly Task	
Week 10	Shopping Budget Tasks	
Week 10	Jail	None
Week 10	Saved contestants	Archana, Dinesh, Manichandra, Nixen and Vichithra were saved, no eviction due to Michaung cyclone.
Week 10	Exits	None
Week 11	Entrances	None
Week 11	Captaincy Task	
Week 11	Captaincy Task	Winner– Manichandra
Week 11	Captaincy Task	Failed– Vijay Varma
Week 11	Captaincy Task	Failed- Maya
Week 11	House Captain	Manichandra
Week 11	Nominations	Archana, Ananya, Dinesh, Nixen, Suresh and Vishnu were nominated for the Week 11 eviction process.
Week 11	House Activity Tasks	
Week 11	Weekly Task	
Week 11	Shopping Budget Tasks	
Week 11	Jail	None
Week 11	Saved contestants	Archana, Dinesh, Nixen and Vishnu were saved from eviction.
Week 11	Exits	On Day 74, Ananya S Rao was evicted mid-week after facing a public vote. On Day 77, Cool Suresh was evicted after facing a public vote.
Week 12	Entrances	None
Week 12	Captaincy Task	No Captaincy Task
Week 12	Captaincy Task	Winner– None
Week 12	Captaincy Task	Failed– None
Week 12	Captaincy Task	Failed - None
Week 12	House Captain	No Captain
Week 12	Nominations	Raveena, Vichithra and Vickram were nominated for the Week 12 eviction process.
Week 12	House Activity Tasks	
Week 12	Weekly Task	
Week 12	Shopping Budget Tasks	
Week 12	Jail	None
Week 12	Saved contestants	Raveena and Vichitra were saved from eviction.
Week 12	Exits	On Day 84, Saravana Vickram was evicted after facing a public vote.
Week 13	Entrances	None
Week 13	Captaincy Task	No Captaincy Task
Week 13	Captaincy Task	Winner–
Week 13	Captaincy Task	Failed–
Week 13	Captaincy Task	Failed
Week 13	House Captain	No Captain
Week 13	Nominations	Dinesh, Manichandra, Maya, Nixen, Raveena, Vijay and Vishnu were nominated for the Week 13 eviction process.
Week 13	House Activity Tasks	
Week 13	Weekly Task	
Week 13	Shopping Budget Tasks	None
Week 13	Jail	None
Week 13	Saved contestants	Dinesh, Manichandra, Maya, Vijay and Vishnu were saved from eviction.
Week 13	Exits	On Day 91, Nixen and Raveena Daha were evicted after facing a public vote.
Week 13	Finalists	Vishnu Vijay won the Ticket To Finale tasks and became the first finalist of the season.
Week 14	Entrances	None
Week 14	Captaincy Task	No Captaincy Task
Week 14	Captaincy Task	Winner–
Week 14	Captaincy Task	Failed–
Week 14	Captaincy Task	Failed
Week 14	House Captain	No Captain
Week 14	Nominations	Archana, Dinesh, Manichandra, Maya, Poornima, Vichithra and Vijay were nominated for the Week 14 eviction process.
Week 14	House Activity Tasks	
Week 14	Weekly Task	
Week 14	Shopping Budget Tasks	
Week 14	Jail	
Week 14	Exits	On Day 96, Poornima Ravi walked out of the Bigg Boss house after accepting the cash-prize eviction with 16 Lakhs. On Day 98, Vichithra was evicted after facing a public vote.
Week 14	Finalists	Archana Ravichandran, Dinesh Gopalsamy, Manichandra, Maya S Krishnan, Vijay Varma and Vishnu Vijay officially became the six finalists of Bigg Boss Season 7.
Week 15	Entrances	
Week 15	Captaincy Task	
Week 15	Captaincy Task	Winner–
Week 15	Captaincy Task	Failed–
Week 15	Captaincy Task	Failed
Week 15	House Captain	No Captain
Week 15	Nominations	
Week 15	House Activity Tasks	
Week 15	Weekly Task	
Week 15	Shopping Budget Tasks	
Week 15	Jail	
Week 15	Exits	On Day 101, Vijay Varma was evicted after facing a public vote.
Grand Finale Day 105
4th Runner Up		Vishnu Vijay
3rd Runner Up		Dinesh Gopalsamy
2nd Runner Up		Maya S. Krishnan
1st Runner Up		Manichandra
Winner		Archana Ravichandran

== Nomination table ==
	Week 1	Week 2	Week 3	Week 4	Week 5		Week 6	Week 7	Week 8		Week 9	Week 10	Week 11			Week 12	Week 13		Week 14	Week 15			
	Week 1	Week 2	Week 3	Week 4	Day 29	Day 35	Week 6	Week 7	Day 44	Day 56	Week 9	Week 10	Day 71	Day 74	Day 76	Week 12	Day 85	Day 86-89	Week 14	Day 103	Day 105 Grand Finale		
Nominees for House Captaincy	All housemates	Jovika; Nixen; Vickram	Aishu; Jovika; Yugendran	Nixen; Poornima; Vijay	Aishu; Jovika; Poornima		Maya; Suresh; Vichithra	Aishu; Dinesh; Jovika	Dinesh; Nixen; Suresh		Jovika; Nixen; Vishnu	Archana; Suresh; Vishnu	Manichandra; Maya; Vijay			No; Captaincy due to reaching or reached Finale week							
House Captain	Vijay	Vickram	Yugendran	Poornima			Maya	Dinesh			Nixen	Vishnu	Manichandra			No; Captaincy due to reaching or reached Finale week							
House Captain Nomination	Bava; Ananya	Vishnu; Suresh	Maya; Pradeep	Manichandra; Jovika	Anna; Bravo	Yes	Vichithra; Archana	Poornima; Vickram	Poornima; Vichithra		Archana; Vickram	Nixen; Vijay	Ananya; Nixen			No; Captaincy due to reaching or reached Finale week							
Small House members	Aishu; Ananya; Bava; Nixen; Raveena; Vinusha; Vichithra; Yugendran	Aishu; ~~Bava~~; Suresh; Maya; Pradeep; Vishnu; Vijay	Maya; Poornima; Pradeep; Vickram; Vinusha; Vishnu; Akshaya	Akshaya; Jovika; Manichandra; Nixen; Pradeep; Yugendran	Anna Bharathi; Archana; Bala; Bravo; Dinesh; Vichithra; Jovika		Archana; Dinesh; Manichandra; Raveena; Suresh; Vichithra	No Small; House Members	Bravo; Jovika; Poornima; Vickram; Vichithra; Vishnu		Archana; Poornima; Suresh; Vickram; Vijay; Vishnu	Ananya; Nixen; Poornima; Raveena; Vickram; Vijay	Suresh; Dinesh; Maya; Raveena; Vichithra; Vickram			Archana; Dinesh; Maya; Nixen; Poornima; Vijay	Manichandra; Raveena; Vichithra; Vishnu		Dinesh; Manichandra; Vijay; Vishnu	No Small; House Members			
Vote to:	Evict					Eject Pradeep	Evict											Ticket To Finale	Cash Eviction	Evict	Win		
Archana	Not in House			Entered (Day 28)	Manichandra; Akshaya	No	Akshaya; Vickram	Maya; Poornima	Poornima; Jovika		Ananya; Jovika	Nixen; Poornima	Nixen; Dinesh	Nominated		Vickram; Raveena	Maya; Nixen	Not eligible (Nominated)	Rejected Cash prize	Nominated	Finalist	Winner (Day 105)	
Manichandra	Bava; Ananya	Maya; Vishnu	Poornima; Maya	Maya; Vinusha	Dinesh; Archana	Yes	Aishu; Bravo	Akshaya; Bravo	Poornima; Bravo		Poornima; Vijay	Ananya; Nixen	House; Captain			Vijay; Nixen	Maya; Vijay	Lost (Nominated)	Rejected Cash prize	Nominated	Finalist	1st runner-up (Day 105)	
Maya	Raveena; Nixen	Manichandra; Vichithra	Manichandra; Vichithra	Manichandra; Nixen	Bravo Anna	Yes	House; Captain	Manichandra; Bala	Vishnu; Bravo		Poornima; Vickram	Ananya; Raveena	Dinesh; Archana	Saved		Raveena; Vichithra	Raveena; Manichandra	Lost (Nominated)	Rejected Cash prize	Nominated	Finalist	2nd runner-up (Day 105)	
Dinesh	Not in House			Entered (Day 28)	Manichandra; Aishu	No	Poornima; Aishu	House; Captain			Vickram; Vishnu	Nixen; Vickram	Nixen; Poornima	Nominated		Vickram; Vichithra	Vichithra; Nixen	Lost (Nominated)	Rejected Cash prize	Nominated	Finalist	3rd runner-up (Day 105)	
Vishnu	Bava; Aishu	Akshaya; Jovika	Nixen; Akshaya	Pradeep; Nixen	Archana; Anna	Yes	Vichithra; Archana	Vickram; Akshaya	Maya; Akshaya		Ananya; Jovika	House Captain	Ananya; Poornima	Nominated		Maya; Vickram	Maya; Vijay	Won Ticket To Finale (Saved)	Rejected Cash prize	Nominated	Finalist	4th runner-up (Day 105)	
Vijay	House Captain	Akshaya; Poornima	Vickram; Vinusha	Evicted (Day 21)						Re-Entered (Day 56)	Manichandra; Raveena	Dinesh; Manichandra	Dinesh; Suresh	Saved		Raveena; Poornima	Vishnu; Raveena	Not eligible (Nominated)	Rejected Cash prize	Nominated	Evicted (Day 101)		
Vichithra	Ananya; Aishu	Vishnu; Maya	Maya; Vishnu	Yugendran; Pradeep	Maya; Manichandra	No	Aishu; Nixen	Vickram; Raveena	Manichandra; Raveena		Suresh; Vickram	Poornima; Vijay	Dinesh; Suresh	Saved		Vickram; Dinesh	Dinesh; Vishnu	Lost (Nominated)	Rejected Cash prize	Evicted (Day 98)			
Poornima	Aishu; Ananya	Pradeep; Suresh	Vichithra; Manichandra	House; Captain			Dinesh; Vichithra	Manichandra; Raveena	Manichandra; Raveena		Ananya; Manichandra	Dinesh; Manichandra	Dinesh; Archana	Saved		Vichithra; Manichandra	Dinesh; Manichandra	Lost (Nominated)	Accepted Cash prize (₹16, 00,000)	Cash Prize Eviction (Day 96)			
Raveena	Jovika; Yugendran	Vishnu; Maya	Maya; Poornima	Yugendran; Jovika	Dinesh; Bravo	Yes	Aishu; Bravo	Vickram; Archana	Vichithra; Jovika		Poornima; Vickram	Maya; Vichithra	Archana; Ananya	Saved		Vijay; Maya	Nixen; Maya	Lost (Nominated)	Evicted (Day 91)				
Nixen	Pradeep; Jovika	Pradeep; Vishnu	Vinusha; Maya	Suresh; Vickram	Bravo; Anna	Yes	Dinesh; Manichandra	Vichithra; Manichandra	Vichithra; Poornima		House Captain	Archana; Manichandra	Suresh; Dinesh	Nominated		Raveena; Manichandra	Manichandra; Dinesh	Lost (Nominated)	Evicted (Day 91)				
Vickram	Nixen; Ananya	House Captain	Vijay; Aishu	Nixen; Pradeep	Anna; Bravo	Yes	Dinesh; Archana	Vishnu; Bravo	Manichandra; Archana		Manichandra; Vichithra	Archana; Vichithra	Vishnu	Saved		Raveena; Vishnu	Evicted (Day 84)						
Suresh	Bava; Aishu	Akshaya; Jovika	Vickram; Pradeep	Nixen; Jovika	Bala; Archana	No	Aishu; Poornima	Vickram; Akshaya	Bravo; Vickram		Maya; Vichithra	Nixen; Vickram	Vichithra; Raveena	Nominated		Evicted (Day 76)							
Ananya	Jovika; Yugendran	Evicted (Day 7)								Re-Entered (Day 56)	Poornima; Suresh	Dinesh; Manichandra	Dinesh; Raveena	Nominated	Evicted (Day 74)								
Jovika	Aishu; Raveena	Vishnu; Maya	Vinusha; Vishnu	Vickram; Suresh	Dinesh; Archana	Yes	Dinesh; Vichithra	Manichandra; Vickram	Nixen; Archana		Suresh; Vickram	Evicted (Day 63)											
Akshaya	Raveena; Aishu	Pradeep; Vishnu	Vinusha; Vickram	Vinusha; Suresh	Bala; Archana	Yes	Archana; Vichithra	Vichithra; Manichandra	Vichithra; Bravo	Evicted (Day 56)													
Bravo	Not in House			Entered (Day 28)	Maya; Aishu	Yes	Raveena; Vichithra	Bala; Vichithra	Archana; Manichandra	Evicted (Day 55)													
Bala	Not in House			Entered (Day 28)	Suresh; Vickram	Yes	Dinesh; Archana	Poornima; Bravo	Evicted (Day 49)														
Aishu	Jovika; Pradeep	Akshaya; Jovika	Pradeep; Poornima	Yugendran; Manichandra	Dinesh; Archana	Yes	Archana; Dinesh	Evicted (Day 42)															
Anna Bharathi	Not in House			Entered (Day 28)	Akshaya; Maya	No	Evicted (Day 35)																
Pradeep	Vinusha; Ananya	Poornima; Vichithra	Akshaya; Aishu	Suresh; Maya	Archana; Bala	Not eligible	Ejected (Day 34)																
Vinusha	Yugendran; Maya	Maya; Vishnu	Vijay; Nixen	Pradeep; Yugendran	Evicted (Day 28)																		
Yugendran	Raveena; Ananya	Vishnu; Maya	House Captain	Vinusha; Maya	Evicted (Day 28)																		
Bava	Suresh; Pradeep	No Nominations	Walked (Day 8)																				
Notes	1, 2	3, 4	5	6, 7, 8	9, 10, 11, 12				13, 14, 15		16		17, 18, 19				20		21, 22	24, 25, 26, 27, 28, 29, 30			
Against Public Vote	Aishu; Ananya; Bava; Jovika; Pradeep; Raveena; Yugendran	Akshaya; Jovika; Maya; Pradeep; Poornima; Vichithra; Vishnu	Akshaya; Aishu; Manichandra; Maya; Nixen; Poornima; Pradeep; Vichithra; Vickram; Vijay; Vinusha	Akshaya; Suresh; Jovika; Manichandra; Maya; Nixen; Pradeep; Vickram; Vinusha; Vishnu; Yugendran	Akshaya; Aishu; Archana; Anna Bharathi; Bala; Bravo; Dinesh; Manichandra; Maya		Aishu; Archana; Bravo; Dinesh; Poornima; Vichithra	Akshaya; Bala; Bravo; Manichandra; Poornima; Raveena; Vichithra; Vickram	Akshaya; Archana; Bravo; Manichandra; Maya; Poornima; Raveena; Vichithra		Ananya; Dinesh; Jovika; Manichandra; Poornima; Suresh; Vichithra; Vickram	Archana; Dinesh; Manichandra; Nixen; Vichithra	Ananya; Archana; Dinesh; Nixen; Suresh; Vishnu		Archana; Dinesh; Nixen; Suresh; Vishnu	Raveena; Vickram; Vichithra	Dinesh; Manichandra; Maya; Nixen; Raveena; Vijay; ~~Vishnu~~		Archana; Dinesh; Manichandra; Maya; Poornima; Vichithra; Vijay; Vishnu	Archana; Dinesh; Manichandra; Maya; Vijay; Vishnu	Archana; Dinesh; Manichandra; Maya; Vishnu		
Re-entered	None										Ananya	None											
Re-entered	None										Vijay	None											
Walked	None	Bava	None																	None			
Ejected	None				Pradeep		None																
Evicted	Ananya	Eviction; Cancelled	Vijay	Vinusha	Anna Bharathi		Aishu	Bala	Bravo		Jovika	Eviction; Cancelled	No; Eviction	Ananya	Suresh	Vickram	Raveena		Vichithra	Vijay	Vishnu	Maya	Archana
Evicted	Ananya	Eviction; Cancelled	Vijay	Yugendran	Anna Bharathi		Aishu	Bala	Akshaya		Jovika	Eviction; Cancelled	No; Eviction	Ananya	Suresh	Vickram	Nixen		Poornima	Vijay	Dinesh	Manichandra	Archana

Color Keys

indicates contestants in the Small House.
indicates the House Captain.
indicates the Nominees for house captaincy.
indicates that the Housemate was safe prior to nominations.
indicates that the Housemate was directly nominated for eviction before the regular nominations process.
indicates the winner.
indicates the first runner-up.
indicates the second runner-up.
indicates the third runner-up.
indicates the fourth runner-up.
indicates that the contestant has re-entered the house.
indicates that the contestant walked out of the show.
indicates that the contestant was ejected directly from the house.
indicates that the contestant was evicted.

Nomination notes

- ^Note 1: Since Vichithra and Yugendran broke the house rules on Day 2, they were banished to the Small House.
- ^Note 2: On Day 7, host Kamal gave Vijay a Strike Warning for being abusive towards Pradeep in Week 1.
- ^Note 3: On Day 8, Bava Chelladurai walked out of the house due to health issues in Week 2.
- ^Note 4: Since Bava Chelladurai walked out of the house, Star Vijay announced on their social media platform that Week 2 will not have an eviction. However the housemates in the house are unaware that there will be no eviction.
- ^Note 5: On Day 17, Akshaya, who was holding the Sabakkal given by Bigg Boss housemates, was sent to Small Boss House
- ^Note 6: Akshaya was directly nominated by housemates, through the Sabakkal twist in Week 3.
- ^Note 7: During the Oxygen tank task in Week 3, the winning house (Bigg Boss House) chose Vishnu from the Small Boss House to be directly nominated for Week 4.
- ^Note 8: On Day 28, Annabharathi, Archana, Bravo, Bala and Dinesh entered the house as wildcard housemates.
- ^Note 9: During a task, Akshaya was nominated to be sent to the Bigg Boss Jail for lacking performance in tasks.
- ^Note 10: Jovika broke household rules in the Bigg Boss house so she was sent to the Small House.
- ^Note 11: Pradeep was ejected from the house with a red card due to breaking household protocols, verbally abusing fellow housemates and for allegedly misbehaving with the female housemates.
- ^Note 12: Housemates chose between evicting Pradeep or allowing him to remain in the house. The majority voted to evict him.
- ^Note 13: Vishnu was given the power to directly nominate two housemates as he won the Star task. He chose Maya and Akshaya.
- ^Note 14: Since the housemates lost 2 of the 3 earthquake (boogambam) tasks, 2 evicted housemates will reenter the game as wildcard housemates.
- ^Note 15: Ananya Rao and Vijay Varma reentered the game.
- ^Note 16: During a task in Week 8, all the housemates directly nominated Dinesh for Week 9 nomination process.
- ^Note 17: Ananya Rao was eliminated on Day 74, with a surprise twist of mid-week eviction, compensating for the cancellation of elimination the previous week.
- ^Note 18: As the winner of Gold Star task, Vickram was saved from Week 11 nominations.
- ^Note 19: Vickram was given the power to directly nominate one housemate as he won the Gold Star task. He chose Vishnu.
- ^Note 20: Vishnu was originally nominated for Week 13 nomination. However, since he won a ticket to the finale he was saved from nomination.
- ^Note 21: All housemates are nominated for the cash-prize eviction including Vishnu, since the cash-prize eviction is for the housemate to accept or reject.
- ^Note 22: All housemates are nominated for week 14 nomination besides Vishnu who is the 1st finalist.
- ^Note 23: On Day 96, Poornima accepted the cash-prize eviction and left the Bigg Boss house.
- ^Note 24: Vijay Varma was eliminated on Day 101 during a midweek eviction in finale week.
- ^Note 25: Archana, Dinesh, Manichandra, Maya and Vishnu officially became finalists of Bigg Boss 7.
- ^Note 26: On Day 105, Vishnu Vijay became the 4th runner up of Bigg Boss 7.
- ^Note 27: On Day 105, Dinesh Gopalsamy became the 3rd runner up of Bigg Boss 7.
- ^Note 28: On Day 105, Maya S Krishnan became the 2nd runner up of Bigg Boss 7.
- ^Note 29: On Day 105, Manichandra became the 1st runner up of Bigg Boss 7.
- ^Note 30: On Day 105, Archana Ravichandran became the winner of Bigg Boss 7 and won the season trophy as well as the 50 Lakh cash prize.
