= Suttum Vizhi Sudare =

- Genre: Drama
- Based on: Chinni
- Written by: Kavya Gopalakrishnan
- Screenplay by: Kavya Gopalakrishnan
- Directed by: Harish Adithya
- Starring: Vinusha Devi; Tanishka Girish; Yuvan Mayilsamy
- Theme music composer: Kiran
- Country of origin: India
- Original language: Tamil
- No. of seasons: 1
- No. of episodes: 200+

Production
- Producer: K. Jayalakshmi
- Production location: Tamil Nadu
- Cinematography: Mopo Anand
- Editor: R.Rajesh Kumar
- Camera setup: Multi-Camera
- Running time: approx. 22–24 minutes per episode
- Production company: Venus Infotainment

Original release
- Network: Star Vijay; Colors Tamil
- Release: 5 January 2026 – present

Suttum Vizhi Sudare - Oru Chinanjiru Kuyilin Kadhai is a 2026 Indian Tamil-language drama television series starring Vinusha Devi, Tanishka Girish and Yuvan Mayilsamy in lead roles. Produced by K. Jayalakshmi under Venus Infotainment, the series is a remake of Star Maa's Telugu language series Chinni.

The series explores the revolving around a young girl named Sudar and her deep bond with her mother, Abinaya. It premiered on Star Vijay on 5 January 2026 and is also available on the digital platform JioHotstar.

== Plot ==
The story is about a young woman named Abi, who was wrongfully jailed for a murder she did not commit. In jail, she learns that she is pregnant and gives birth to a daughter, Sudar. After spending ten years in prison with her mother, Sudar is taken away by an NGO worker, Radhika, to go and live with her brother, Shanmugam.

Sudar faces hostility from Sarala, Shanmugam's wife. Abinaya continues to worry about her daughter's safety and future. As the story unfolds, secrets begin to unravel about her life, both in the past and present.

== Cast ==
=== Main ===
- Vinusha Devi as Abinaya: Shanmugam's sister; Vetri's wife; Sudar's mother
- Tanishka Girish as Sudar: Abi and Vetri's daughter
- Yuvan Mayilsamy as Vetri: Abi's husband; Sudar's father

=== Recurring ===
- Rajkumar Manoharan as Shanmugam: Abi's brother; Sarala's husband
- Ishwar Raghunathan as Karna: Vetri's elder brother
- Chandhini Prakash as Swetha: Parvathy's younger sister
- Atchiya Bharathi as Sarala: Shanmugam's wife
- Marxim Karki as Tarun: Shanmugam and Sarala’s Son
- Sri Madu as Dhiya: Shanmugam and Sarala’s Daughter
- Koushik Shiva as Mahesh: Karna & Parvathy Son
- Jayaram Mohan as Manickam: Karna Rival
- Dr. Jaya as Radhika
- Pushpa Vetriselvan as Kanchana
- Vennila as Madhavi DSP
- Shabana as Kumutha
- Ambani Shankar as Puli: Vetri's friend
- Vikash Sampath as Prabakaran
- Varun Udhai as Diwakar
- Deepthi Kapil as Sandhya
- Janani Prabhu as Parvathy (dead)

== Production ==
=== Development ===
It is an adaptation of Star Maa's Telugu language series Chinni. The series is directed by Harish Adithya, known for his television soap operas such as Kalyana Parisu 2 (2014), Thirumagal (2020) and Thangamagal (2024–2025). The series is produced by K. Jayalakshmi under the Venus Infotainment and the music by Kiran.

=== Casting ===
Bharathi Kannamma serial fame Vinusha Devi was cast as female lead Abi, Tanishka Girish was cast as Sudar, Yuvan Mayilsamy was cast as male lead Vetri, he had worked with Harish Adithya's series Thangamagal.

Actors Ishwar and Rajkumar were cast in important roles. Actor Fawaz was cast as private role but he left the series and was replaced by actor Vikash in March 2026.

=== Release ===
On 25 November 2025, the first Launch promo was released, giving a brief insight into Sudar's talk with her pregnant mother. The second promo was released on 17 December 2025, featuring Abi and Sudar's life and revealing the plot through a song. On 28 December 2025, they revealed the release date.

The show started airing on Star Vijay on 5 January 2026 on Monday to Saturday, replacing Magale En Marumagale
