= Amudhavum Annalakshmiyum =

2022 Indian television series

- Genre: Family drama
- Created by: Muthuselvan
- Written by: Dialogues: Mithra Azhaguvel
- Story by: Muthuselvan
- Directed by: S. Jeevarajan
- Starring: Kanmani Manoharan; Rajashree; Arun Padmanabhan
- Music by: Rakshith. K
- Opening theme: "Kangal Kanda Kaayam"
- Country of origin: India
- Original language: Tamil
- No. of seasons: 2
- No. of episodes: 470

Production
- Executive producer: Chandru Eenamuthu
- Producers: Anwar; Ansar; Co Producers: Perumalswamy; Lakshmiyammal
- Cinematography: Sugaselvan
- Editor: G.Daniel Rajadurai
- Camera setup: Multi-camera
- Production company: Abdullah Productions

Original release
- Network: Zee Tamil
- Release: 4 July 2022 – 20 January 2024

Amudhavum Annalakshmiyum is a 2022-2024 Indian Tamil-language soap opera starring Kanmani Manoharan and Rajashree, both are in the titular roles with Arun Padmanabhan.

It premiered on Zee Tamil on 4 July 2022 from Monday to Friday, and ended with 470 Episode from on 20 January 2024 and is also available on the digital platform on Zee5.

== Cast ==
=== Main ===
- Kanmani Manoharan in dual role as
  - Amudha
    - An enthusiastic and dynamic woman who discontinued the education and take cares the family due to her mother's demise. So being an uneducated woman, she wants a teacher has a groom. She was Chithambaram's eldest daughter; Elango's youngest sister; Selva and Uma's eldest sister; Senthil's love interest
  - Bhavani (2023-2024)
    - Amudha's twin sister, an IPS officer, Elango's second youngest Sister, Selva and Uma's second Eldest Sister. (Dead)
- Rajashree as Annalakshmi
  - She was a soft and sweet mother of Senthil, Paramu, Vadivel and Bhuvana. Her pride was his eldest son Senthil, as he full filled her dream to become a teacher. She also decided Senthil to be marry with Amudha
- Arun Padmanabhan as Senthil
  - A responsible and respectable man and his mother Annalakshmi was his world. His family believed that he was a teacher in Government School but he hides the truth and works as clerk in that same school. He was Paramu's youngest brother; Vadivel and Bhuvana's eldest brother; He falls in love with Amudha at first sight.
- Amruth Kalam as Tharun (2023)
  - Bhavani's fiancée

=== Supporting ===
- Raj Kapoor as Manickam
  - Annalashmi's brother; Senthil, Paramu, Vadivel and Bhuvana's maternal uncle
- Ravi Prakash as Chithambaram
  - Amudha, Elango, Selva and Uma's father; Nagalakshmi's father-in-law
- Syamantha Kiran as Parameshwari (Paramu)
  - Annalakshmi's eldest daughter; Chinna's wife; Senthil, Vadivel and Bhuvana's eldest sister
- Salma Arun as Nagalaskhmi (Naagu) (Antagonist)
  - Chithambaram's daughter-in-law; Elango's wife; Amudha, Selva and Uma's eldest sister-in-law
- Anandha Krishnan as Elango
  - Chithambaram's eldest son; Nagalaskhmi's husband; Amudha, Selva and Uma's eldest brother
- Munish Raja as Chinna
  - Annalakshmi's son-in-law; Paramu's husband; Senthil, Vadivel and Bhuvana's eldest brother-in-law
- Sathya Raaja as Vadivel
  - Annalakshmi's youngest son; Paramu and Senthil's youngest brother; Bhuvana's eldest brother
- Jeeva Rajendran / DJD Kenny as Selva
  - Chithambaram's youngest son; Elango and Amudha's youngest brother; Uma's eldest brother
- Muthazhagi as Uma
  - Palani's wife; Chithambaram's youngest daughter; Elango, Amudha and Selva's youngest sister
- Prabukuttimani as Palani
  - Uma's husband
- Akshara as Bhuvana
  - Annalakshmi's youngest daughter; Paramu, Senthil and Vadivel's youngest sister
- Sujatha Selvaraj as Shanthi
  - Nagalakshmi's mother
- J. Livingston as Kathiresan (deceased)
  - Annalakshmi's husband and Vedhanayaki's son; Senthil, Paramu, Vadivel and Bhuvana's father
- Vadivukkarasi as Nachiyar
  - Chithambaram's mother; Amudha, Elango, Selva and Uma's grandmother
- Gaayathri Krishnan as Vedhanayaki
  - Annalakshmi's mother-in-law; Senthil, Paramu, Vadivel and Bhuvana's grandmother

== Production ==
=== Development ===
The series shoot began in January 2022 and the first promo was released on 9 February 2022 by revealing only half of the series title name Amudhavum _____, with the main leads Kanmani Manoharan, known as Sweety (Bharathi Kannamma fame) and Arun Padmanabhan (Mangalya Dosham fame) where Amudha, one of the name of the title was played by Kanmani.

The promo creates longing among the audience for the full title name and the series is expected to be launched on March or April, but the team postponed and the shoot was halted, also no further announcements regarding the series launch and the promo was not telecasting on Zee Tamil TV for three months. This makes the rumors that the series was shelved and believed that it was dropped.

In May 2022, the shoot was begun and filmed at Karaikudi. Finally the production team and the channel put an end to the rumors by releasing the second promo on 8 June 2022 with the additional cast members and revealing the full title name Amudhavum Annalakshmiyum, where Annalakshmi character was played by Karuthamma fame actress Rajashree. Within a week, the official launch date and timings was released. Sofia, was selected to play the role Nagalakshmi but she quit the series by making only the promo appearance, later she was replaced by Salma Arun. Likewise Blacksheep fame Shamni was signed to play the character Bhuvana, but she also left the series before the series launch by making only promo appearance, then Akshara replaced her in that role.

=== Promotion ===
Zee Tamil was promoted their new three fictions Maari, Meenakshi Ponnunga and including this series by making advertisement with popular film actress Sneha, Saranya Ponvannan and Sangeetha with the slogan Vanga Paarkalaam Ithu Namma Time and this promo released on 26 June 2022.

The Channel also arranged the press meet with the cast of the three fictions at Vadapalani, Chennai.

During Week 52 2022, it became No:2 Serial in 7:00PM Slot with excellent ratings.

== Adaptations ==
Language	Title	Original release	Network(s)	Last aired	Notes
Tamil	Amudhavum Annalakshmiyum அமுதாவும் அன்னலட்சுமியும்	4 July 2022	Zee Tamil	20 January 2024	Original
Telugu	Maavaru Mastaru మావారు మాస్టారు	12 June 2023	Zee Telugu	16 November 2023	Remake

== Awards and nominations ==
Year	Award	Category	Recipient	Role	Result
2022	Zee Tamil Kudumbam Viruthugal 2022	Most Popular Marumagal	Kanmani Manoharan	Amudha	Won
2022	Zee Tamil Kudumbam Viruthugal 2022	Most Popular Mamiyar	Rajashree	Annalakshmi	Won
2022	Zee Tamil Kudumbam Viruthugal 2022	Most Promising Actor	Arun Padmanabhan	Senthil	Won
2022	Zee Tamil Kudumbam Viruthugal 2022	Best Supporting Actor Male	Raj Kapoor	Manickam	Won
2022	Zee Tamil Kudumbam Viruthugal 2022	Favorite Heroine	Kanmani Manoharan	Amudha	Nominated
2023	Zee Tamil Kudumbam Viruthugal 2023	Best Actor Female	Kanmani Manoharan	Amudha	Nominated
2023	Zee Tamil Kudumbam Viruthugal 2023	Most Popular Marumagal	Kanmani Manoharan	Amudha	Nominated
2023	Zee Tamil Kudumbam Viruthugal 2023	Pudumai Penn	Kanmani Manoharan	Amudha	Won
2023	Zee Tamil Kudumbam Viruthugal 2023	Best Actor Male	Arun Padmanabhan	Senthil	Nominated
2023	Zee Tamil Kudumbam Viruthugal 2023	Best On Screen Pair	Arun Padmanabhan & Kanmani Manoharan	Senthil & Amudha	Nominated
2023	Zee Tamil Kudumbam Viruthugal 2023	Favorite On Screen Pair	Arun Padmanabhan & Kanmani Manoharan	Senthil & Amudha	Nominated
2023	Zee Tamil Kudumbam Viruthugal 2023	Most Popular Mamiyar	Rajashree	Annalakshmi	Nominated
