= Sandakozhi (TV series) =

Tamil television series

- Genre: Romance; Soap opera
- Written by: Muthu Palanisamy; Bharathi Thambi
- Screenplay by: Amalraj
- Directed by: Melnarmaa; G.P Thulasiraman; S.T Gunasekaran
- Starring: Riya Vishwanathan; Niyaz Khan
- Music by: Rakshith. K; Climent. G
- Country of origin: India
- Original language: Tamil
- No. of seasons: 2
- No. of episodes: 442

Production
- Producer: CJ Anilkumar; Sheeba Dhamodharan
- Cinematography: K.Nithin; Anand Raj
- Editor: Bala
- Camera setup: Multi-camera
- Running time: 20–22 minutes per episode
- Production company: Vilvam Studio

Original release
- Network: Zee Tamil
- Release: 8 May 2023 – 17 August 2024

Related
- Poove Poochudava

Sandakozhi (transl. Fighting Rooster) is a 2023-2024 Indian Tamil-language television series, aired from 8 May 2023 on Zee Tamil and streaming on ZEE5. The series stars Riya Vishwanathan and Niyaz Khan in the lead roles. The theme of the story was taken from Poove Poochudava, where both leads clash. The show ended on 17 August 2024 with 442 episodes.

== Cast ==
=== Main ===
- Riya Vishwanathan as Mahalakshmi (Maha)/ Kaveri
  - A well-educated woman from a lower-middle-class family, Second daughter of Ganeshan and Jyothi. She is bold, bubbly and independent. Her economic state leads her to deliver sweets for her family sweet company. She aspires to get a good job to help her family out. Because for her sister's life concern, she married Vikram.
  - After she and Vikram are in a car accident, she ends up losing her memory and becomes Kaveri, a businesswoman.
- Niyaz Khan as Vikram/Murugan
  - A man who has completed his studies abroad to run the family real estate business. However, he hates women and believe that they are a distraction. At starting days he hates Maha but destiny made him marry her.
  - After he gets into a car accident with Maha, he loses his memory and becomes Murugan, a servant for Kaveri's household.
- Madhan Pandian as Vettri (2024)

=== Recurring ===
- VJ Kathir as Vijay – Vikram's younger brother; was initially a playboy, but changes after marrying Aishwarya.
- Subalakshmi Rangan (episodes 1–183) / Yalini Rajan (episodes 184–442) as Aishwarya – Maha and Suba's elder sister; the first daughter of Ganeshan and Jyothi, who helps run the family sweet business. She had a love interest on Vijay and married him.
- Kiruba as Nandini – Vikram, Vijay and Swetha's mother. She hated Maha and her family.
- Guru Hawkman as G.K – Vikram, Vijay and Swetha's father; Nandini's husband
- Tamilselvi as Jyothi – Aishwarya, Maha and Suba's mother; Ganeshan's wife. She aspires marry Maha and Aishwarya off to a good household.
- Sivakumar as Ganeshan – Aishwarya, Maha and Suba's father; Jyothi's husband
- Mohana VJ as Suba – Third daughter of Ganeshan and Jyothi; Aishwarya and Maha's younger sister.
- Udumalai Ravi as Pulimurugan – Nandini's brother and sidekick
- Rajesh Gadde as Vignesh – Ex-lover of Aishwarya. He blackmail's Aishwarya after she married with Vijay.
- Gowri as Eshwari – Saravana and Abhinaya's mother; Aishwarya, Maha and Suba's aunt; Jyothi's elder sister
- Ashok Pandian as Periyappa – Saravana and Abhinaya's father; Aishwarya, Maha and Suba's uncle; Eshwari's husband
- Anisha Ishwarya as Abhinaya – Aishwarya, Maha and Suba's cousin sister; Eshwari's daughter; Saravana's younger sister. She loved Vijay but he married Aishwarya, so she hates Maha's family.
- Navin Charles as Saravana – Abhinaya's elder brother; Aishwarya, Maha and Suba's cousin brother; Eshwari's son; Swetha's husband
- Keerthi Vijay as Swetha – Vikram and Vijay's younger sister; Saravana's wife
- KPY Raja as Perumal – friend of Vijay

=== Cameo ===
- Rayan as Ashok – Ex-fiancé of Aishwarya
- Sofiya as Anu – Ex-fiancée of Vikram
- Vasu Vikram as Poonai Kannan – A rowdy who sketch to kill Maha for Nandini
- Vasanth Gopinath as Shiva – A detective
- Vaishnavi Arulmozhi as Rudra - A doctor who saves Mahalakshmi

== Production ==
=== Development ===
In 2023, Zee Tamil planned to reboot Poove Poochudava, whilst the series would be produced by Vilvam Studio.

=== Casting ===
Riya Vishwanathan was cast in the female lead role as Mahalakshmi, which marks her return after Raja Rani 2. Niyaz Khan was cast in the male lead role as Vikram, a businessman from a rich family. VJ Kathir was cast as Vikram's brother. Subalakshmi Rangan was initially cast to play Mahalakshmi's elder sister, but was replaced by Yalini Rajan in October 2023. Kiruba was cast to play Vikram, Vijay and Swetha's mother Nandini, the negative lead.

In July 2024 Madhan Pandian was cast to play new lead Vettri thus making her second collaboration with Zee Tamil after Poove Poochudava.

=== Release ===
The first promo of the series was released on 25 April 2023 featuring Niyaz Khan and Riya Vishwanathan revealing the release date. The show started airing on Zee Tamil on 8 May 2023, replacing Rettai Roja.
