= Archana Ravichandran =

Indian television actress (born 1997)

- Born: Archana Ravichandran; 11 November 1997 (age 29); Chennai, Tamil Nadu, India
- Occupations: Television personality; Actress
- Years active: 2020 – present
- Known for: Bigg Boss 7
- Partner: Arun Prasath (engaged in 2025)

Archana Ravichandran (born 11 November 1997) is an Indian actress and television personality who predominantly works in Tamil television and films. She is known for her role as Archana in Raja Rani 2. She participated in the reality show Bigg Boss 7 and emerged as the winner in 2024.

== Career ==
Archana started her career as a video jockey on Sun TV. She has appeared in some television programs on Sun Tv during her early stages in her career. She made her television debut in the serial Raja Rani 2 along with Alya Manasa. In the serial, she plays the character role of Archana. She also appeared in the show Murattu Singles which aired on Star Vijay. Archana debuted in the film Demonte Colony 2 as a film actress and is currently undergoing filming and post production work alongside actor Arulnithi.

Archana won the Indian reality show Bigg Boss Season 7, which started in October 2023. She is also the first wildcard contestant to win the show in a main series in whole Bigg Boss franchise in India.

In 2024, she joined music director Arun Raj and sang the song titled Toxic Kadhal which later became a sensational hit around India and received positive reviews from critics.

== Personal life ==
Archana announced her relationship with co television actor Arun Prasath in 2024.

== Filmography ==
=== Television ===
Year	Title	Channel	Role	Notes	Ref.
2020 – 2022	Raja Rani Season 2	Star Vijay	Archana	Vijay Television Awards- Best Actress; Replaced by Archana Kumar	
2021–2022	Bharathi Kannamma	Star Vijay	Archana	Special appearance	
2021	Thaenmozhi B.A	Star Vijay	Devi	Special appearance	
2021	Morattu Single season 2	Star Vijay	Contestant	Episodic Appearance	
2021	Comedy Raja Kalakkal Rani	Star Vijay	Contestant	Eliminated	
2022	Indira	Zee Tamil	Mangai	Special Appearance	
2023 – 2024	Bigg Boss 7	Star Vijay	Contestant	Winner	
2024	Bigg Boss Kondattam	Star Vijay	Guest		
2024	Bigg Boss 8	Star Vijay	Guest	To support Arun Prasath	

=== Films ===
Year	Title	Role	Ref.
2024	Demonte Colony 2	Aishwarya	
2026	Lenin Pandiyan	VAO Podhum Ponnu	

=== Web series ===
Year	Title	Role	Ref.
2020	Kanave Kanave		
2021	Enaku Kalyana Vayasu Vandhuduchu		
2023	Aval Ennaval	Maathi	
2026	Octopus (2026)	Archana	

=== Music videos ===
Year	Title	Singer(s)	Ref.
2023	Imaigalo	AniVee	
2023	Dhamma Thundu Kaadhal	Dharan Kumar	
2024	Toxic Kadhal	Arun Raj & Archana Ravichandran	

=== Short films ===
Year	Title	Role	Ref.
2022	Truth or Dare		
2022	Love insurance		
2022	MR Single		

== See also ==
- List of Indian television actresses

Preceded by Mohammed Azeem	Bigg Boss Tamil Winner (Series 7) 2023-2024	Succeeded by Muthukumaran Jegatheesan
