= Madras Matinee =

2025 Tamil film by Karthikeyan Mani

- Theatrical release poster
- Directed by: Karthikeyan Mani
- Written by: Karthikeyan Mani
- Produced by: Karthikeyan Mani; Dev Ananth
- Starring: Kaali Venkat; Roshini Haripriyan; Shelly Kishore; Vishva; Sathyaraj
- Cinematography: Anand G K
- Edited by: Satheesh Kumar Samuski
- Music by: K C Balasarangan
- Production company: Madras Motion Pictures
- Distributed by: Dream Warrior Pictures
- Release date: 6 June 2025
- Country: India
- Language: Tamil

Madras Matinee is a 2025 Indian Tamil-language family drama film written, co-produced and directed by debutant director Karthikeyan Mani and produced under the banner Madras Motion Pictures. The film features Kaali Venkat, Roshini Haripriyan, Shelly Kishore, Vishva and Sathyaraj in the lead roles, alongside George Maryan, Chaams, Sunil Sukhada, and Archana Chandhoke in pivotal roles.

Madras Matinee was theatrically released on 6 June 2025.

== Plot ==
An aging sci-fi writer is challenged by his caretaker to write about the common man. Reluctantly, he begins the story of Kannan, an auto driver, and his family - only to discover that ordinary life holds unexpected depth and drama. A seasoned science fiction writer, guided by his caregiver, steps out of his imaginative worlds to explore real-life stories. He begins documenting the life of Kannan, an everyday auto-rickshaw driver, and his humble family. What starts as a reluctant attempt soon reveals the emotional richness hidden in ordinary routines. Through their journey, the author rediscovers purpose and finds beauty in life's simple moments.

== Cast ==
- Kaali Venkat as Kannan
- Roshini Haripriyan as Deepika
  - Varsha, Shakshika, Haranya as young Deepika
  - Kothaimozhiyaal as baby Deepika
- Shelly Kishore as Kamalam
- Vishva as Dinesh
  - Dhanush Karthik as young Dinesh
  - Ruthra Mahadev as baby Dinesh
- Sathyaraj as Jyoti Ramaiah "JR"
- George Maryan as Kamal
- Chaams as Pickle seller
- Sunil Sukhada as Boomer Uncle / AE
- Geetha Kailasam as Pachondhi Prema
- Vijay TV Ramar as Raghu
- Swaminathan as Bank Manager
- Archana Chandhoke as Priya
- Bhanu Priyamvada as Lilly
- Jangiri Madhumitha as Boomer Aunty
- Mimer Karthi Keyan as Vinod
  - Prabhu as young Vinod
- Anantha Varshan as Gayle
- Arunachalam as Subramani "Subs"
- Bigil as Brownie

== Production ==
Through a first-look poster, the upcoming film titled Madras Matinee starring Sathyaraj, Kaali Venkat, Roshini Haripriyan, Shelly Kishore and Vishva was announced in early-April 2025. The film is written and directed by debutant director Karthikeyan Mani and produced under the Madras Motion Pictures banner and presented by Dream Warrior Pictures. The technical team consists of cinematography by Anand G K, music by K C Balasarangan, editing by Satheesh Kumar Samuski and art direction by Jackie.

== Music ==
Madras Matinee

Soundtrack album by K C Balasarangan
- Genre: Feature film soundtrack
- Language: Tamil
- Producer: K C Balasarangan

Singles from Madras Matinee
- 1. "Enna Da Polappu Idhu" Released: 19 May 2025; 2. "Usure Unna Thaane" Released: 30 May 2025

The film has music composed by K C Balasarangan. The song titled "Enna Da Polappu Idhu" sung by Vadivelu, marking his first such attempt, where he has lent his voice for a film that he hasn't acted in, was released on 19 May 2025. The second single "Usure Unna Thaane" was released on 30 May 2025.

Track listing
No.	Title	Lyrics	Singer(s)	Length
1.	"Enna Da Polappu Idhu"	Snekan	Vadivelu
2.	"Usure Unna Thaane"	Snekan	Vijay Yesudas
3.	"Kai Mel Nilavai"		S. P. Charan

== Release ==
=== Theatrical ===
Madras Matinee was theatrically released on 6 June 2025. Earlier the film was scheduled for 23 May 2025.

=== Home media ===
Madras Matinee is set to be premiered on Sun NXT and Amazon Prime Video on 4 July 2025.

== Reception ==
Ashwin S of Cinema Express gave 2.5/5 stars and wrote "While it is technically strong, the film has flaws when it comes to its screenplay. To avoid going into dramatic zones and leaving the audience with a heavy heart, Madras Matinee undercuts its conflicts, which ends up lowering the stakes for its characters." Abhinav Subramanian of The Times of India gave 2/5 stars and wrote "Madras Matinee wants desperately to find poetry in the prosaic, meaning in the mundane. Instead, it discovers what every writer learns eventually, that sometimes a garbage collector's story is just about collecting garbage."
