= Riya Vishwanathan =

Indian television actress

- Occupations: Actress; dancer
- Years active: 2022–present

Riya Vishwanathan is an Indian television actress. She has made her acting debut with 2020 soap opera Raja Rani where she replaced Alya Manasa and played the lead role Sandhya from January 2022. But she suddenly quit the series in February 2023 citing personal and mental health issues. After a break, now she is seen on the series Sandakozhi which airs on Zee Tamil.

== Television ==
Year	Title	Role	Notes	Ref.
2022–2023	Raja Rani	Sandhya	TV debut; Replacement of Alya Manasa and Replaced by Asha V. Gowda	
2022	Bharathi Kannamma	Sandhya	Special appearance	
2023–2024	Sandakozhi	Mahalakshmi		
2023	Nala Damayanthi	Riya	Guest appearance	
2024–2025	Idhayam	Andal	Supporting lead	
2026	Kayal	Sakthi	Supporting lead	
