= Nizharkudai =

2025 Tamil film

- Theatrical Release Poster
- Directed by: Shiva Arumugam
- Written by: Shiva Arumugam; Himeshbala (Dialogues)
- Produced by: Jothisiva
- Starring: Devayani; Vijjth; Kanmani Manoharan
- Cinematography: RB Gurudev
- Edited by: Rolex
- Music by: Naren Balakumar
- Production company: Dharshan films
- Distributed by: Blockbuster Productions; Khafa Exports
- Release date: 9 May 2025
- Country: India
- Language: Tamil

Nizharkudai (transl. Shade) is a 2025 Indian Tamil-language film written and directed by Shiva Arumugam, starring Devayani, Vijjith and Kanmani Manoharan in the lead roles. The film is produced by Jothisiva under his Dharshan films and the film has cinematography done by RB Gurudev, music by Naren Balakumar, and editing done by Rolex.

Nizharkudai was released in theatres on 9 May 2025.

== Plot ==
Niranjan and Lancy, a couple driven by their dream of moving to the US, hire Jothi, a Tamil refugee with a tragic past, to care for their daughter Nila. As Jothi forms a deep bond with Nila, Niranjan and Lancy grow increasingly distant, consumed by their ambitions and neglecting their roles as parents.

== Cast ==
- Devayani as Jothi
- Vijjith as Niranjan
- Kanmani Manoharan as Lancy
- Vadivukkarasi
- Raj Kapoor as Mohan Ram
- Manoj Kumar
- Ilavarasu as Police Inspector
- Neelima Rani as Doctor
- Dharshan Siva
- Niharika
- G. V. Ahana Asni
- Kavitha Ravi
- Praveen
- Advocate Rajasekaran
- Varan
- Akshara
- Suma
- Preethi

== Production ==
The film is written and directed by debutant director Shiva Arumugam starring Devayani, Vijjith and Kanmani Manoharan in the lead roles. The film is produced by Jothisiva under his Dharshan films banner while technical team has cinematography done by RB Gurudev, music by Naren Balakumar, and editing done by Rolex. The film stars Raj Kapoor, Vadivukkarasi, Ilavarasu, Neelima Rani, Niharika, Ahana, Dharshan Siva in supporting roles.

== Music ==
Nizharkudai

Soundtrack album by Naren Balakumar
- Studios: Contrabass; Naren Music Factory; Red Pine Recording Studio
- Genre: Feature film soundtrack
- Language: Tamil
- Label: Mass Audios
- Producer: Naren Balakumar

Naren Balakumar chronology
| Echo (2023) | Nizharkudai (2025) |

Singles from Nizharkudai
- 1. "Kanne Kanmaniye" Released: 24 April 2025

The film has music composed by Naren Balakumar and the pre-release audio launch event was conducted on 24 April 2025 in Prasad Studios, Chennai.

| No. | Title | Lyrics | Singer(s) | Length |
|---|---|---|---|---|
| 1. | "Kanne Kanmaniye" | Padmaja Sriram | Saindhavi |

== Release ==
Nizharkudai was released in theatres on 9 May 2025 by Blockbuster Productions in Tamil Nadu and Puducherry.

== Reception ==
A critic of Dinamalar rated the film 2.75/5 stars, by praising the story selection, while criticizing the screenplay to be uninteresting. Abhinav Subramanian of The Times of India gave 1.5/5 stars and wrote "Nizharkudai tries to tackle important themes like parental neglect and the sacrifices made for ambition. It was like a lecture disguised as a movie; even dramas can be fun, but this one was just preachy. In its eagerness to deliver a message, the film forgets that even the most important stories need to breathe."

Prashanth Vallavan of Cinema Express gave 1.5/5 stars and wrote "Nizhar Kudai is an unsubtle commentary on the modern family system. However, it fails to make a pragmatic and compelling argument for the forgotten traditional values it champions. [...] While it advocates for a healthier lifestyle, Nizhar Kudai’s example of achieving it by giving up on your dreams renders its central message sounding bleak and hopeless."

== See also ==
- Portrayals of Sri Lankan Tamils in Indian cinema
