= Arun Prasath =

Indian television actor

- Born: November 30, 1991 (age 34); Salem, India
- Occupation: Actor
- Years active: 2011–present
- Known for: Bharathi Kannamma
- Partner: Archana Ravichandran (2024-present)

Arun Prasath (born 30 November 1991) is an Indian television actor. He is known for his role in the serial Bharathi Kannamma. and he is known for his participation in the Indian reality show, Bigg Boss 8.

== Career ==
In 2011, he made his debut as an actor with the short film Paran Kalam, which was well received in local film industry. Arun later played a supporting role in the film Meyaadha Maan playing the role of Kishore, the film was released in 2017 and went on to be a hit.

In 2019, Arun gained widespread recognition for his role in the Star Vijay series Bharathi Kannamma, where he played the lead role of Bharathi. In 2021, Arun won the Best Actor Award for his performance in the series at the Vijay Television Awards.

In 2024, he participated in the reality show Bigg Boss 8 as contestant. He was later evicted at 8th position from the show on Day 97.

== Filmography ==
=== Television ===
Year	Title	Role	Note(s)	Ref.
2019–2023	Bharathi Kannamma	Dr.Bharathi	Lead Role	
2020	Pandian Stores	Dr.Bharathi	Special appearance	
2021–2022	Raja Rani	Dr.Bharathi	Special appearance	
2022	Kana Kaanum Kaalangal	Himself	Guest role	
2024–2025	Bigg Boss 8	Contestant	Evicted Day 97	
2026–present	Kadhal Kadhal Kadhal	Aadhavan		

=== Films ===
Year	Film	Role	Language	Notes
2011	Paran Kalam	Kumar	Tamil	Short film
2017	Meyaadha Maan	Kishore	Tamil	
2019	Jada	Jada's friend	Tamil	
