= Octopus (2026) =

2026 Indian Tamil web series

- Genre: Suspense; Thriller
- Written by: Jeyachandra Hashmi
- Directed by: Jeyachandra Hashmi
- Starring: Ashwin Kumar; Archana Ravichandran; Vinoth Kishan; Sidhu Kumaresan; Kalaivani Bhaskar
- Country of origin: India
- Original language: Tamil
- No. of seasons: 1
- No. of episodes: 7

Production
- Producers: Adithya J Raju; Lisha P Chandran
- Production company: Cinemum

Original release
- Network: Zee 5

Octopus is a 2026 Indian Tamil-language suspense thriller web series written and directed by Jeyachandra Hashmi. It stars Ashwin Kumar, Archana Ravichandran, Vinoth Kishan, Sidhu Kumaresan and Kalaivani Bhaskar in pivotal roles.

Produced by Adithya J Raju and Lisha P Chandran under the Cinemum banner, the seven-episode Tamil ZEE5 Original follows the residents of a housing complex who investigate the disappearance of Nikitha, a newly married woman.

Octopus premieres on Zee 5 on 27 November 2026.

== Plot ==
Newlyweds Varun and Nikitha move into a residential neighbourhood. Nikitha, who had been rejected by both families after marrying for love, suddenly disappears one night after a scream is heard in the complex.

With no family to support her, the residents become Nikitha's closest relatives and file a police complaint. As the investigation stalls, they begin searching for answers themselves, uncovering suspicion, hidden relationships and secrets within the neighbourhood.

== Cast ==
- Ashwin Kumar Lakshmikanthan as Varun
- Archana Ravichandran as Archana
- Vinoth Kishan as Barath
- Sidhu Kumaresan as Nikitha
- Kalaivani Bhaskar as Shalini
- Vijay Varadharaj
- Bhagavathi Perumal

== Production ==
Octopus was written and directed by Jeyachandra Hashmi, marking his directorial debut. Hashmi had earlier created Koose Munisamy Veerappan.

Hashmi said that he wrote the story during the COVID-19 lockdown, drawing on the experience of living in closed and restricted neighbourhoods. He described the series as an exploration of the hidden layers within people, relationships and society, with a mystery and a woman at the centre of the narrative.

== Release ==
The official trailer was released in November 2026 and was shared by actor Vijay Sethupathi on his X account.

The series premieres on Zee 5 on 27 November 2026, with all seven episodes available in Tamil.
