= Garudan (2024 film) =

2024 Indian Tamil film

- Theatrical release poster
- Directed by: R. S. Durai Senthilkumar
- Written by: R. S. Durai Senthilkumar
- Produced by: Vetrimaaran
- Starring: Soori; M. Sasikumar; Unni Mukundan
- Cinematography: Arthur A. Wilson
- Edited by: Pradeep E. Ragav
- Music by: Yuvan Shankar Raja
- Production companies: Grass Root Film Company; Lark Studios
- Distributed by: Five Star K. Senthil
- Release date: 31 May 2024
- Running time: 133 minutes
- Country: India
- Language: Tamil

Garudan (transl. Brahminy kite) is a 2024 Indian Tamil-language action drama film written and directed by R. S. Durai Senthilkumar and jointly produced by Vetrimaaran and K. Kumar under Grass Root Film Company and Lark Studios. The film stars Soori, M. Sasikumar and Unni Mukundan in the leading roles, alongside Roshini Haripriyan, Sshivada, Revathi Sharma, Samuthirakani, Vadivukkarasi, R. V. Udayakumar and Mime Gopi in supporting roles. It follows Sokkan, a trusted confidante of two childhood friends Aadhi and Karuna, whose loyalty is changed by a dynamic between betrayal and survival.

The film was officially announced untitled in September 2023, and is Soori's second film as the story's lead actor, after Viduthalai Part 1. Principal photography commenced the same month and wrapped in January 2024. The title Garudan was announced later that month. The film's music was composed by Yuvan Shankar Raja, while the cinematography and editing were handled by Arthur A. Wilson and Pradeep E. Ragav.

Garudan was released worldwide on 31 May 2024 to positive reviews from critics and became commercially successful. It was remade in Telugu as Bhairavam.

== Plot ==
Karuna and Aadhi are close childhood friends living in Kombai, Theni. During their childhood, Sokkan, an orphan, saves Karuna from danger, and Karuna takes in Sokkan as a form of gratitude. Sokkan became loyal to Karuna. The three of them grew up in the care of Karuna's grandmother, Sellayee, the head of the trustee committee of the Kombai Amman temple. Being a zamin heir, Karuna lives in poverty with a meagre income from his brick kiln, while Aadhi owns a few lorries. Karuna and Aadhi remain powerful in Kombai while presiding and managing as temple trustees.

Meanwhile, Thangapandi, the Registration Department Minister, plans to usurp unclaimed land worth ₹330 crores near Chennai and learns that the land belongs to the Kombai Amman temple while the original deed is in a jewellery box in the temple. After Sellayee's death, Nagaraj, Thangapandi's relative, plans to become the temple committee head at Thangapandi's instruction. However, Sokkan becomes the temple committee head with the support of Aadhi and Karuna. To somehow redeem the bond, Nagaraj provokes Karuna's wife, Angayarkanni, and his brother-in-law, Vairavel, by kindling their greed for money. Thangapandi forces Inspector Muthuvel to join his coercion to aid Nagaraj in his plan.

Vairavel, angry with Aadhi for forcing him to marry Parveen, whom he had cheated, stirs up trouble between Aadhi and Karuna. After discovering fake jewels in the temple's jewellery box and Karuna's involvement with it, Aadhi hands him over to the police, thinking of bailing him out using his property. Nagaraj and Vairavel stop him, who brings the actual jewellery. The conflict deepens as Karuna feels betrayed. On the day of the temple festival, they plan to attack the jewellery box-carrying van during transport from the bank to the temple, but Aadhi thwarts them. At the festival, a fight unfolds between Aadhi and Nagaraj's henchmen. Karuna pretends to fight the thieves. Sokkan, possessed by the divine, chops off Vairavel's hand and saves Aadhi.

Realising that he cannot take the deed as long as Aadhi is alive, Karuna takes Sokkan to Kodaikanal, leaves him there and returns along with Nagaraj and his henchmen to kill Aadhi. Aadhi's wife, Katyayini, advises handing over the bond so they can use a portion of the land's ₹20 crores for Kombai's development works. Aadhi accepts, but Karuna and Vairavel brutally kill Aadhi. Sokkan follows Karuna from Kodaikanal only to get called to Aadhi's house for lunch. Sokkan finds Aadhi's mutilated corpse, leaving him and Katyayini devastated. While seeking justice, Katyayini lashes out Sokkan for hiding the truth about Karuna killing Aadhi but he does not betray Karuna due to his loyalty towards him. Karuna informs Sokkan that he killed Aadhi only in self-defence. Karuna escapes the punishment as Katyaini tries but fails to find any witness. Aadhi's son Samaran, who wanted to avenge his father's death, tries to kill Karuna, but Sokkan stops him, who protects him from Karuna, but he catches Vinnarasi with Karuna.

Sokkan takes him to protect Samaran to a different town. Nagaraj spots the duo and tries to kill Samaran, but Sokkan kills Nagaraj and surrenders to the police station. When Karuna comes and inquires, Sokkan confesses that he killed Nagaraj and Vairavel. At the police station lock-up, Karuna's former business partner informs that Karuna was behind Sellayee's death as she resisted Karuna from substituting the temple jewels with the fake ones. The business partner had recorded Karuna's plan of adding the poison to Sellayee's toddy and later showed the videos to Aadhi, who went to question Karuna, resulting in his death. On his way to appear before the magistrate, Sokkan escapes and goes to Karuna's brick kiln to seek justice. Realising that Sokkan knows the truth, Karuna brutally attacks Sokkan.

Meanwhile, Katyayini and Samaran arrive in search of Vinnarasi, but Karuna brutally thrashes them. Sokkan discovers Vinnarasi in the kiln's chamber, prepared to be cremated alive, and decides to fight back. Sokkan saves Vinnarasi, Katyayini and Samaran by ultimately killing Karuna. Muthuvel provides this information to his superior officer as a detailed report along with his resignation. The police officer secretly tells Thangapandi that if Sokkan is convicted, the law will punish him and his associates for the murders and the temple land theft. Without another choice, Sokkan is released and reunites with Vinnarasi. In the end credits, Thangapandi gets fatally killed in a road accident.

== Cast ==
- Soori as Sokkan
- M. Sasikumar as Aadhi
- Unni Mukundan as Karuna
- Sshivada as Katyayini, Aadhi's wife
- Roshini Haripriyan as Angayarkanni "Angu", Karuna's wife
- Revathy Sharma as Vinnarasi "Vinnu", Sokka's love interest
- Samuthirakani as Inspector E. Muthuvel
- George Maryan as Constable I. Tiruvettai
- Mime Gopi as Nagaraj
- R. V. Udayakumar as Minister K. Thangapandi
- Vadivukkarasi as Sellayee, Karuna's grandmother
- Dushyanth Jayaprakash as Vairavel
- Vazhakku En Muthuraman as Karuna's father-in-law
- Brigida Saga as Parveen
- Abhishek Vinod as Adv. Kathiravan
- G. Marimuthu as Aadhi's father (photo presence only)
- Mayilsamy as Karuna's father (photo presence only)
- Rajapandi as Aadhi's Lawyer

== Production ==
After the success of Viduthalai Part 1 in 2023, it was announced that Soori would begin his next project as the lead actor, after completing filming pending portions for Viduthalai Part 2. The project would be directed by R. S. Durai Senthilkumar, reportedly written by Vetrimaaran and produced by K. Kumar's Lark Studios, who had been associating with Soori for a long time. The company made a public announcement on 11 September, confirming the project, which was tentatively titled Karudan. A muhurat puja was held the same day at Kumbakonam in Tamil Nadu with the film's cast and crew. The film's official title, Garudan, was revealed on 19 January 2024.

M. Sasikumar, Unni Mukundan, Revathi Sharma, Sshivada and Roshini Haripriyan would play prominent roles. Roshini would make her film debut with this film. All of their inclusions were confirmed during their presence at the muhurat puja. Music composer Yuvan Shankar Raja, editor Pradeep E. Ragav and cinematographer Arthur A. Wilson were chosen for the technical crew.

Principal photography began in September 2023, and wrapped in early January 2024. Although the film's story was marketed as Vetrimaaran's story, Senthilkumar stated during the promotions that the story actually came from Soori himself.

== Music ==
=== Soundtrack ===
The music and background score is composed by Yuvan Shankar Raja, in his maiden collaboration with Sasikumar and Soori (in leading roles) and Senthilkumar. The first single, "Panjavarna Kiliye", released on 10 February 2024. The complete soundtrack was released on 21 May 2024.

Track listing
No.	Title	Writer(s)	Singer(s)	Length
1.	"Kombu Vecha"	Snehan	Anthony Daasan	3:26
2.	"Panjavarna Kiliye"	Snehan	Yuvan Shankar Raja	2:44
3.	"Aeroplanil Yeri"	Snehan	Mukesh, Chinna Ponnu, Sugandhi, Guru Ayyadurai	3:14
4.	"Othapada Veriyattam"	Super Subu	Sam, Velu, Shenbagaraj, Aravind	4:18
5.	"Kannil Kodi"	Uma Devi	Adithya RK	2:44
6.	"Iruthiyai Nee"	Uma Devi	Chinmayi Sripada	2:44
7.	"Glimpse of Garudan"	-	Yuvan Shankar Raja	2:04
Total length:				21:14

=== Background score ===
Garudan

Film score by Yuvan Shankar Raja
- Released: 12 July 2024
- Recorded: 2023–2024
- Studio: U1 Records
- Genre: Film score
- Length: 82:08
- Language: Tamil
- Label: Think Music
- Producer: Yuvan Shankar Raja
External audio
- Film Score Volume 1 on YouTube
- Film Score Volume 2 on YouTube

The original background score of Garudan, composed by Yuvan Shankar Raja, was officially released by Think Music on 12 July 2024. Volume 2 was released on 27 August 2024.

All tracks are written by Yuvan Shankar Raja.

No.	Title	Length
1.	"Garudan Title"	0:58
2.	"3 Friends Intro"	2:54
3.	"Aadhi Forest Entry"	1:10
4.	"Aadhi & Wife Discussion"	0:50
5.	"Aadhi Gets To Know About Karna"	0:52
6.	"Aadhi Handing Over Pattayam"	1:18
7.	"Aadhi Murder Plan"	0:40
8.	"Aadhi Murder Scene"	5:11
9.	"Aadhi Murder Setup"	2:25
10.	"Almirah Fall"	0:22
11.	"Apatha Theme"	0:11
12.	"Appatha's Confusion"	0:54
13.	"Arrival Of Gold"	1:41
14.	"Chokkan About His Love"	0:51
15.	"Chokkan At Hospital"	1:57
16.	"Chokkan Diving Into The Well"	1:08
17.	"Chokkan Finds Aadhi"	1:59
18.	"Chokkan Intro"	0:30
19.	"Chokkan Love Theme 1"	1:26
20.	"Chokkan Love Theme 2"	0:36
21.	"Chokkan Love Theme 3"	0:21
22.	"Chokkan Murder's Theatre kaaran"	5:20
23.	"Chokkan Temple Trustee"	0:18
24.	"Chokkan's Apology"	1:11
25.	"Chokkan's Fun"	0:13
26.	"Chokkan's Rage"	2:18
27.	"Chokkan's Regret"	1:18
28.	"Chokkan's Trust"	0:22
29.	"Election Setup"	0:42
30.	"Garudan Rap Theme"	3:18
31.	"Karuna & Theatre Kaaran Discussion"	0:48
32.	"Karuna & Wife Discussion"	0:48
33.	"Karuna Arrest"	1:28
34.	"Karuna Leaving Police Station"	0:40
35.	"Karuna's Theme"	3:50
36.	"Mann Theme"	1:05
37.	"Minister Intro"	2:51
38.	"Parveen's Issue"	1:12
39.	"Pattayam Deal With Minister"	1:28
40.	"Pattayam Transporting"	4:21
41.	"Pen Theme"	0:20
42.	"Police Emotion"	0:29
43.	"Police Spying"	0:33
44.	"Ponn Theme"	0:46
45.	"Temple Argument"	1:31
46.	"Temple Fight"	5:13
47.	"Temple Gold Missing"	1:43
48.	"Theatre Kaaran Deal"	0:52
49.	"Theatre Kaaran Intro"	2:17
50.	"Climax Fight"	6:39
Total length:		82:08

== Release ==
Garudan was released worldwide on 31 May 2024 in theatres.

=== Home media ===
Garudan began streaming on Amazon Prime Video from 3 July 2024.

== Reception ==
=== Critical response ===
Garudan received positive reviews from critics, who praised the lead cast performances (especially Soori, Sasikumar, Mukundan), Yuvan's background score and Senthilkumar's screenplay and direction.

Abhinav Subramanian of The Times of India rated 3.5/5 stars and noted that "Garuden will appeal to those who like an emotional rural action flick." Writing for OTTPlay, Anusha Sundar rated the film 3/5 with praise for Soori's performance noting "Garudan is a solid film that perfectly suits Soori as a follow-up, after playing the lead in Viduthalai." In his review for The Hindu, Gopinath Rajendran praised the film writing,"With a neatly woven script that has enough brawn to overcome its minor shortcomings, director RS Durai Senthilkumar makes a splendid comeback with this raw and intense rural drama." In his review for The Indian Express, Kirubakhar Purushottaman praised the writing of Vetrimaaran, Senthilkumar's direction and Soori's performance. Writing for Cinema Express, Sudhir Srinivasan remarked, "Soori, like he did in Viduthalai Part 1, fills up the character with so much innocence, and this means that when he does fight back, when he even utters a word of protest, it feels heroic, for this isn’t a man enjoying his heroism."
