= Raja Rani (Tamil TV series) =

Indian television series

- Season 2
- Genre: Drama
- Created by: Susanta Das (Season 1); Shashi Sumeet Mittal; Sumeet Hukamchand Mittal (Season 2)
- Written by: Priya Thambi (S1-2)
- Screenplay by: Maruthu Shanker
- Directed by: Praveen Bennett (S1-2)
- Starring: Alya Manasa (S1-2); Sanjeev Karthick (S1); Riya Vishwanathan (S2); Sidhu Sid (S2); Praveena (S2); Asha V. Gowda (S2); Archana Ravichandran (S2)
- Theme music composer: Ilayavan; Kiran
- Country of origin: India
- Original language: Tamil
- No. of seasons: 2
- No. of episodes: 1307

Production
- Producer: Venkatesh Babu
- Cinematography: Saravanan
- Camera setup: Multi-camera
- Running time: 22 minutes
- Production company: Global Villagers

Original release
- Network: Star Vijay
- Release: 29 May 2017 – 21 March 2023

Related
- Ke Apon Ke Por (S1); Diya Aur Baati Hum (S2)

Raja Rani (transl. King Queen) is an Indian Tamil drama television series that debuted on Star Vijay on 29 May 2017. The show is produced by Global Villagers and directed by Praveen Bennett, and has two seasons.

The first season starring Sanjeev Karthick and Alya Manasa aired from 29 May 2017 to 13 July 2019. The second season premiered on 12 October 2020 and ended with 725 episodes from 21 March 2023. Alya Manasa, Riya Vishwanathan, Sidhu Sid, Asha V. Gowda and Praveena are playing the lead roles in the television serial.

The first season is a remake of the Bengali serial Ke Apon Ke Por of Star Jalsha. The second season is a remake of the Hindi serial Diya Aur Baati Hum of StarPlus.

== Series overview ==
Series	Episodes	Originally released	
Series	Episodes	First released	Last released
1	582	29 May 2017	13 July 2019
2	725	12 October 2020	21 March 2023

== Plot ==
The story focuses on Semba a.k.a. Sembaruthi, a maid working for the Rajasekar family. Both Rajasekar and his wife Lakshmi treat Semba as their own daughter, but their daughters-in-law Archana and Vadivu and Rajasekar's elder daughter worry that Semba will inherit part of the family property, reducing their own shares, so they mistreat Semba. Karthik is Rajasekar's youngest son and returns to Chennai after a period spent working as a scientist in Singapore. Karthik combats the difficulties Semba faces.

Karthik's girlfriend Divya comes from Singapore to visit his family. Vadivu's brother Sanjay attempts to seduce Semba but is stopped by Karthik, who decides that Semba should marry and uploads her profile to a marriage website. A groom comes to visit, but Sanjay intercepts him and tells him lies about Semba, so he leaves without meeting her. Archana brings in a groom who is a distant relative and an alcoholic. The groom's family proposes marriage within two days, and Rajasekar's family accepts the proposal. Preparations for the wedding are in full swing when it is discovered that the groom is still married to his first wife, whom he abandoned.

Meanwhile, Karthik and Divya are planning to get engaged on Semba's wedding day. Divya goes to the airport to fetch her parents, who are arriving from Singapore. Semba's marriage is stopped and Rajasekar is blamed by everyone for her pitiable position. Rajasekar is devastated and persuades Karthik to marry Semba to mitigate the disaster of the failed wedding. Divya arrives at the last moment, just in time to see the wedding become official. Divya asks Karthik whether he married Semba only out of pity, but he remains silent and leaves angrily.

After Divya leaves, Karthik expresses his anger by throwing things. His mother realises that her son has been sacrificed, and she becomes furious and turns against her husband, and eventually Semba. Semba does not expect Karthik to treat her like a real wife, so she continues to work as a maid. One day Lakshmi's friend comes to meet Semba, not knowing her history, and she criticises the family for marrying a maid to their son. Humiliated, Lakshmi is persuaded by Archana and Vadivu to call Divya back. Meanwhile, Rajasekar plans a reception for the newlyweds, but is only supported by his brother Chandrasekar, youngest daughter Vinodhini, and her fiancé Harish.

Divya comes to the reception and causes drama when Karthik accepts Semba as his wife. Then the couple prepares to spend their first night together, but Lakshmi suddenly begins to have chest pains. Karthik panics and stays with his mother. Since she is not allowed to see Lakshmi, Semba sleeps alone in the room that she was to share with Karthik. This event is a turning point, as Lakshmi and Karthik begin to appreciate her. Archana, Vadivu and Sanjay all try to undermine Semba and make her leave the house, but Karthik begins to fall in love with her.

A beauty competition leads Archana to overwork Semba by giving her beauty treatments. Karthik becomes angry, and makes Semba participate in the competition, which she eventually wins.

Karthik entrusts Semba with documents about his confidential project involving space and the military. Archana, Vadivu and Sanjay steal the documents and blame Semba. Karthik is angry and humiliates Semba, who finds the documents and reveals that Sanjay was the thief, but is so humiliated that she leaves the house. Karthik later finds her and brings her home.

Karthik and Semba's relationship becomes stronger, and he confesses his love to her and she accepts. Meanwhile, Divya offers Karthik a job without revealing her identity. He and Semba go to a party to celebrate his new job, and find Divya there. She was previously married to Vicky, a rich 65-year-old businessman, and is wealthy.

While Karthik is working at her company, Divya moves into his house as a guest and tries to get help from the family to separate Semba and Karthik. Archana, Vadivu and Sanjay agree to leave Karthik alone in the house, in return for ₹50,000,000. Divya drugs Karthik; while he is unconscious she tries to have sex with him, but Semba uncovers her plot.

Despite Vinodhini's engagement to Harish, Vadivu's father Devraj wants his son Sanjay to marry her instead, to gain control of Rajasekar's family. When Harish's family asks about the dowry, Devraj increases the dowry to stop the marriage. Rajasekar is not very well off, and tries to take ₹8,000,000 in savings from his bank, but his cheque bounces. The bank manager says that Rajasekar's elder son Amudhan has forged his signature and emptied his account. Devraj, knowing this, has set a trap by making Rajasekar's house security for a loan of ₹5,000,000 lakhs (500 billion), carrying interest of 0.2% per week. At Harish and Vinodhini's marriage, the money lender stops the proceedings by demanding his weekly interest, as Devraj planned. Finally, Rajasekar sells his house to cover the debt. Harish's family members are humiliated by this incident. Archana and Vadivu fight Harish's family and his mother is injured. Kathiresan, Harish's father, then cancels the marriage. The marriage hall manager demands to be paid for the costs of the wedding, and all the family members except Archana and Vadivu give up their gold and jewels including Semba's thaali, the marital holy mangala sutra necklace. The family is left almost destitute, and their family maid Shanthi finds them a modest house. Semba plays a Kabbadi game and Swarna is determined to win against her, and lets Archana and Vadivu join her team. Semba's team wins, angering Swarna. Karthik gets a job but is later rejected due to meddling by Divya. He decides to get a job as a taxi driver and meets Veni, the company owner. Veni likes his pleasant character and starts to fall in love with him not knowing that he is already married. She tells Semba to get them married, but Semba says that she's already married to him. Veni is initially hurt and upset but later forgives them. Harish puts all his effort into impressing Vinodhini, who is angry at him since the marriage incident. Vadivu runs for election against Swarna but loses. Archana sees Amudhan having an affair with another lady and tells Semba, who goes to the lady's house. After she returns, Semba tells Archana to be kind to Amudhan, and Archana starts to like her. Karthik, Semba, Vinodhini and Harish try to scare Vatti, who has just moved into Rajasekar's old house. Vatti catches them red-handed, but later is frightened and tells them if they give him half the sale amount in two days, they will regain their house. Harish promises his parents that after he gives Vinodhini money he will never see her again, and tries to give her money. She realises how much he loves her and rejects the money. Veni helps Karthik's family and gives them some money, and through much effort they are able to get enough money to regain their house. Lakshmi's sister visits the house and holds a competition for best daughter-in-law. Semba wins and Archana gets angry and turns against her again. Vinodhini asks if she can marry Harish and they agree to meet the family, but Harish's family insults them, provoking conflict. She attempts suicide but Semba stops her. She then decides to run away and marry Harish, but the next day she receives a voicemail from Semba saying that Rajasekar had a heart attack, so she returns and agrees to marry the man of her family's choosing. When the family goes to the temple, Harish's parents apologise and ask to have Vinodhini and Harish marry. They agree and the couple marry with the families' blessings. Semba's family goes to the village where she grew up. The villagers believe that Rajasekar killed Semba's father. She eventually discovers the truth and becomes upset with him, but later forgives him. Vinodhini becomes pregnant and the family is happy with the news. Karthik gets a transfer to Singapore and is leaving in a few days. Vadivu scolds her children for going near Semba, but she later realises her mistakes when Semba teaches her a lesson and she apologises to her. On her last day, Archana realises Semba's kind heart and stops her from going to Singapore, and apologises for all her mistakes.

== Cast ==
=== Season 1 ===
==== Main ====
- Alya Manasa as Sembaruthi "Semba"
- Sanjeev as Karthick
- Nikitha Murali as Maya

==== Supporting ====
- Sridevi Ashok as Archana
- VJ Shabnam as Vadivu
- Pavithra Janani (Epi 1-251) / Anshu Reddy (Epi 252-582) as Divya
- Auditor Sridhar as Rajasekar
- Rajya Lakshmi as Lakshmi
- M.Shriram as Chandrasekar
- Kovai Babu as Amudhan
- Eshwar (Epi 1-350) / KPY Kuraishi (Epi 351-582) as Chandhran
- Aishwarya Appaya as Nandhini
- Pradeep Raj as Dr. Vinoth
- Vaishali Taniga (Epi 1-252) / Geethanjali Sinha (Epi 253-331) / Rithika Tamil Selvi (Epi 332-582) as Vinodhini
- Akshay Kamal as Harish
- Karthik Sasidharan as Sanjay
- Andrew Jesudoss as Devaraj
- Chandhini Prakash as Swarna
- Anuradha Krishnamurthy as Saraswati
- Padmapriya Shrimali as Veni
- Jayalakshmi as Kausalya "Kaushi"
- Diya Palakkal as Priya
- Megna Saranlal as Rakshitha
- Master Nikhil Krishna as Rakshan
- Karate Venkatesan as Thangamuthu
- Yogesh as Vikram
- Madurai Mohan as Ramasamy

==== Guests ====
- Senthil Kumar as Mayan
- Ma Ka Pa Anand
- Rio Raj
- Raksha Holla as Devi
- Shivani Narayanan as Sneha
- V. J. Chitra as Mullai
- Hema Rajkumar as Meena

=== Season 2 ===
==== Main ====
- Alya Manasa (2020– March 2022) / Riya Vishwanathan (April 2022–Feb 2023) / Asha Venkatesh Gowda (2023) as Sandhya
- Sidhu Sid as Saravanan - Sandhya's husband
- Praveena as Sivagami-

==== Supporting ====
- Archana Ravichandran (2020–2022) / Archana Kumar (2023) as Archana
- Vaishnavi Sundar as Parvathy
- Saivam Ravi as Ravi Sundaram
- Balaji Thiyagarajan Dayalan as Senthil
- VJ Britto Ravi as Vicky
- VJ Prathosh as Aditya
- Navya Suji as Mayil
- Sangeetha as Jessi
- Ashwin Kannan as Baskar
- Salsa Mani as Mani
- Niharika Rajjith as Janani
- Gayatri Priya
- Pasanga Sivakumar
- Srilekha Parthasarathy
- Uma Riyaz Khan as Gowri
- Dakshitha as Priya
- Mounika Devi as Kavita
- Unknown as Selvam
- Lokesh Baskar as Abdul
- Unknown as Jothi

==== Guests ====
- Roshini Haripriyan / Vinusha Devi as Kannamaa
- Arun Prasath as Dr. Bharathi
- Roopa Sree as Soundarya
- Kanmani Manoharan / Aruljothi Arokiyaraj as Anjali
- Agilan Pushparaj / Sugesh Kumar as Akhil

== Production ==
=== Casting ===
==== Season 2 ====
Alya Manasa quit the series in 2022 for baby delivery and was replaced by Riya Vishwanathan as Santhiya. In February 2023 Riya Vishwanathan quit the series owing health issues and was replaced by Asha Venkatesh Gowda as Santhiya.

== Adaptations ==
=== Season 1 ===
Language	Title	Original release	Network(s)	Last aired	Notes
Bengali	Ke Apon Ke Por কে আপন কে পর	25 July 2016	Star Jalsha	27 December 2020	Original
Tamil	Raja Rani ராஜா ராணி	29 May 2017	Star Vijay	13 July 2019	Remake
Telugu	Kathalo Rajakumari కథలో రాజకుమారి	29 January 2018	Star Maa	24 January 2020	Remake
Marathi	Sukh Mhanje Nakki Kay Asta! सुख म्हणजे नक्की काय असतं!	17 August 2020	Star Pravah	Ongoing	Remake
Malayalam	Padatha Painkili പാടാത്ത പൈങ്കിളി	7 September 2020	Asianet	24 March 2023	Remake
Hindi	Saath Nibhaana Saathiya 2 साथ निभाना साथिया २	19 October 2020	StarPlus	16 July 2022	Remake

=== Season 2 ===
Language	Title	Original release	Network(s)	Last aired	Notes
Hindi	Diya Aur Baati Hum दिया और बाती हम	29 August 2011	StarPlus	10 September 2016	Original
Bengali	Tomay Amay Mile তোমায় আমায় মিলে	11 March 2013	Star Jalsha	20 March 2016	Remake
Malayalam	Parasparam പരസ്പരം	22 July 2013	Asianet	31 August 2018	Remake
Marathi	Phulala Sugandha Maticha फुलाला सुगंध मातीचा	2 September 2020	Star Pravah	4 December 2022	Remake
Tamil	Raja Rani 2 ராஜா ராணி 2	12 October 2020	Star Vijay	21 March 2023	Remake
Telugu	Janaki Kalaganaledu జానకి కలగలేదు	22 March 2021	Star Maa	19 August 2023	Remake
