= Panivizhum Malarvanam (TV series) =

- Genre: Drama
- Screenplay by: K.M Saravanan
- Story by: K.M Saravanan; Dialogues: Nanthan Sridar
- Directed by: Francis Kathiravan and Haris Athitya
- Starring: Sidharth Kumaran; Vinusha Devi; Sathya SK; Shilpa
- Country of origin: India
- Original language: Tamil
- No. of seasons: 1
- No. of episodes: 219

Production
- Producer: Pa. Jakanath
- Production location: Chennai
- Cinematography: Ramesh
- Editor: R. Vijaykrishanan
- Camera setup: Multi-camera
- Running time: approx.20–22 minutes per episode
- Production company: Box Office Studio

Original release
- Network: Star Vijay
- Release: 24 June 2024 – 29 March 2025

Panivizhum Malarvanam (transl. A Forest of Flowers Where Dew Falls) is a 2024-2025 Indian Tamil language drama television series that aired on Star Vijay from 24 June 2024 and available on the digital platform Disney+ Hotstar. The series stars an ensemble cast including Siddharth Kumaran, Vinusha Devi, Shilpa, Rayan, Thejank and Sathya SK.

The show is produced under the banner of Box Office Studio and directed by Francis Kathiravan. It is premiere on Star Vijay on 24 June 2024 and ended with 219 episodes on 29 March 2025.

== Cast ==
=== Main ===
- Siddharth Kumaran as Kathirvel aka Kathir: Anupama's brother Anbirkiniyal's Husband
- Shilpa as Anupama aka Anu: Kathirvel's sister Cheran's wife
- Vinusha Devi as Anbirkiniyal aka Anbu - Cheran's sister, Kathirvel's wife
- Rayan (2024) / Thejank (2025) as Cheran: Anbirkiniyal’s brother Anupama's husband

=== Recurring ===
- Seema G. Nair as Raja Rajeshwari. Kathir,Siva & Anupama Mother (Antagonist)
- Ashwanth Thilak as Ganesh
- Nalinikanth (2024-2025) → Mohan Vaidya (2025) as Parameswaran
- Rubiseena / VJ Mohana as Mohana: Cheran's classmate who loves him one side (Antagonist)
- Syamantha Kiran as Kalai Selvi (Antagonist)
- Bhala Kumar as Siva, elder brother of Kathir and Anupama
- Saivam Ravi as Anbu & Cheran Father
- Dharani as Krishnaveni
- Sai Gopi as Lingam (Antagonist)
- Prabhakaran as Ekambaram
- Premalatha
- Sathya SK (2024) → Ferozkhan (2025) as Inspector Kaarvannan
- Madhan as Madhan Anupama's college classmate
- Elamaran as Sabari Cheran's friend
- Aadhavan
- Swetha
- Deepa Nethran as Anbu & Cheran's mom (dead)

== Production ==
=== Development ===
The series was announced by Star Vijay in April 2024.

=== Casting ===
In early 2024, Sidharth Kumaran and Vinusha Devi were reportedly cast the series and was officially confirmed on 22 March. Vinusha Devi was cast in the female lead role. Thamizhum Saraswathiyum series fame actor Rayan was cast as Cheran, then later Actor Thejank replaced the role of Cheran from January 2025.

Actress Shilpa was cast as the second female lead role as Anu. Sathiya was cast as private role, In May 2024. However he left the series for the show Bigg boss 8, and then later actor Ferozkhan replaced the role of Kaarvannan from October 2024. Rubeena and Rubiseena were cast for the supporting roles.

=== Release ===
The first promo was released on 23 April 2024, which showed Kathiravel, the main hero getting a cake baked for his sister and him shedding a tear when his henchmen talk about his sister. The second promo was unveiled on 31 May 2024, showing Kathiravel and his henchmen coming to Anu's college to celebrate her birthday to her anger. The third promo was unveiled on 14 June 2024, featuring protagonist Sidharth Kumaran, Vinusha Devi, Shilpa and Rayan. It is scheduled to air in the second half of 2024.
