= Kanmani Manoharan =

Indian television actress

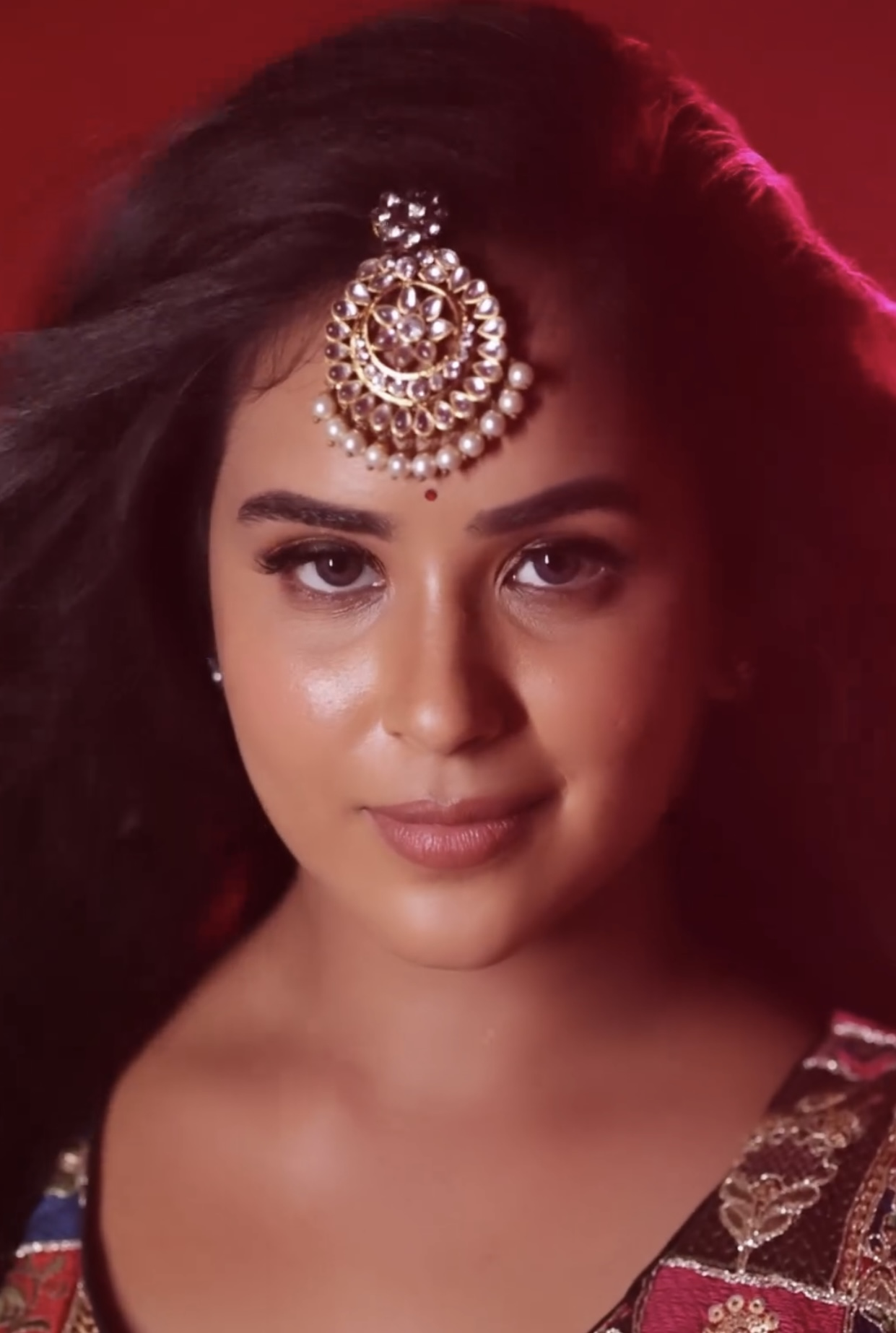
- Kanmani in 2024
- Born: 10 June 1995 (age 30); Bengaluru, Karnataka, India
- Other names: Sweety, Kanmani Aswath
- Occupation: Actress
- Years active: 2019 – present
- Spouse: Aswath Chandrasekhar (m. 2024)
- Children: 1

Kanmani Manoharan (born 10 June 1995) is an Indian television actress who works in Tamil language television. She is known for her role as Anjali in the soap opera Bharathi Kannamma which airs on Star Vijay from 2019.

== Career ==
In 2019, Kanmani started her career in the Tamil TV series, Bharathi Kannamma serial Anjali. In 2022, Kanmani got the opportunity to act in the soap opera Amudhavum Annalakshmiyum which air on Zee Tamil, she played the role as Amudha in the series. She is also one of the most followed Tamil television actresses on Instagram.

== Personal life ==
On 3rd July 2024, Kanmani got engaged to television actor Aswath Chandrasekhar and got married at 15th September 2024.

On 8th June 2025, Kanmani gave birth to a son in Apollo Hospital, Greams Lane Chennai.

== Films ==
Year	Title	Role	Ref.
2025	Nizharkudai	Lancy	

== Television ==
Year	Title	Characters	Network	Notes
2019–Jan 2022	Bharathi Kannamma	Anjali	Star Vijay	Negative turned Positive Role; Replaced by Aruljothi Arockiaraj
2020	Pandian Stores	Anjali	Star Vijay	Special appearance
2022	Sa Re Ga Ma Pa Seniors season 3	Herself	Zee Tamil	Guest
2022	Super Queen	Herself & Contestant	Zee Tamil	
2022–2024	Amudhavum Annalakshmiyum	Amudha & Bhavani	Zee Tamil	Dual Lead Role
2024	Mahanadhi	Vennila	Star Vijay	Special appearance
