= Vinusha Devi =

Indian model and actress (born 1998)

- Born: Vinusha Devi; 5 December 1998 (age 27); Chennai, Tamil Nadu, India
- Other name: Vinuja
- Occupations: Actress; model
- Years active: 2021 – present

Vinusha Devi (born 5 December 1998) is an Indian actress and model who predominantly appears in Tamil soap opera. She is known for her lead role in Tamil TV series Bharathi Kannamma. (2022-2023)

== Early life ==
Vinusha was born on 5 December 1998 in Chennai.in a telugu speaking family. After finishing her graduation, she started her career in modeling and acting.

== Career ==
In 2021, while pursuing her career in modeling she got an opportunity to act in a Tamil film titled N4. Vinusha played an important role in the film. Later in November 2021, she replaced Roshini Haripriyan for her role of Kannamma in popular television series Bharathi Kannamma. This marked Vinusha's television debut in a lead role.

== Filmography ==
=== Films ===
Year	Film	Role	Ref.
2023	N4	Abhinaya	

=== Television ===
Year	Show	Role	Channel	Notes	Ref
2022–2023	Bharathi Kannamma	Kannamma	Star Vijay	Replacing Roshini Haripriyan	
2023	Bharathi Kannamma 2	Chitra (Kannamma)	Star Vijay		
2023	Bigg Boss Season 7- Tamil	Contestant	Star Vijay	Evicted Day 28	
2024	Super Singer 10	Dancer	Star Vijay		
2024–2025	Panivizhum Malarvanam	Anbirkiniyal	Star Vijay		
2025	Veduvan		ZEE5		
2026	Suttum Vizhi Sudare	Abinaya	Star Vijay		

== Awards ==
Year	Award	Category	Role	Show	Result	Ref.
2022	Vijay Television Awards	Find of the year (Fiction)	Kannamma	Bharathi Kannamma	Won	
