= Roshini Haripriyan =

Indian model and actress

Roshni Haripriyan
- Born: Roshni Haripriyan; 30 November 1993 (age 32); Chennai, Tamil Nadu, India
- Other names: Roshini; Kannamaa
- Education: Ethiraj College for Women
- Occupations: Actress; model
- Years active: 2019 – present
- Spouse: K. S. Sundaramurthy (m. 2026)

Roshni Haripriyan, better known as Roshini is an Indian actress and model who predominantly appears in Tamil films. She is well-known for playing the lead in the Tamil-language television series Bharathi Kannamma. In 2022, she was a contestant on the reality cooking series Cooku with Comali (season 3). She got widespread attention in a critically acclaimed film Garudan which was released in 2024.

Roshini was also nominated and listed by The Times of India as Most Desirable Women on Indian Television for both 2019 and 2020.

== Early life ==
Roshini was born to her parents Haripriyan (father) and Amala (mother) in Chennai, Tamil Nadu. She did her schooling at St Mary's Matriculation Girls Higher Secondary School, Chennai and completed her degree in human biology from Ethiraj College for Women, Chennai.

== Career ==
Roshini made her debut into television in 2019 by first debuting in the soap opera Bharathi Kannamma, which aired on Star Vijay playing the lead character role known as Kannamma. However in 2021, she announced a sudden drop out from the cast since she accepted a major offer to appear in a film that would mark her film debut and hence was replaced by actress Vinusha Devi. However besides television, Roshini also appeared in many advertisements and short films. In 2022, she also appeared in the cooking show Cooku with Comali (season 3), however she was eliminated from the show just before the finale took place.

== Media ==
In 2019 and 2020 two years in a row, Roshini was listed in The Times of India's Top 20 Most Desirable Women on Indian Television.

== Filmography ==
=== Films ===
Year	Film	Role	Notes	Ref.
2019	Scars of Society	Sailija	Short film	
2024	Garudan	Angayarkanni		
2025	Madras Matinee	Deepika		
2025	Thalaivan Thalaivii	Ragavarthini		

=== Television ===
Year	Show	Role	Channel	Notes	Ref.
2019–2021	Bharathi Kannamma	Kannamma	Star Vijay	Replaced by Vinusha Devi	
2022	Cooku with Comali (season 3)	Contestant	Star Vijay	Eliminated; Episodes (1 – 45)	

=== Music videos ===
Year	Title	Singer(s)
2016	Angel	Praveen Sebastian
2020	Kadhal Sollum Neram	Kirthana. G
2021	ADIYE	Reshman Kumar
2023	Nee Mattum	Krithika Nelson

== Accolades ==
Year	Award	Category	Role	Show	Result	Ref.
2021	Vijay Television Awards	Most Favorite & Best Heroine on Television	Kannamma	Bharathi Kannamma	Won	

== See also ==
- List of Indian television actresses
