= Bharathi Kannamma (2019 TV series) =

Indian television series

- Barathi Kannama TV series poster
- Genre: Drama
- Created by: Pradeep Panicker
- Written by: Maruthu Shankar; Pradeep Panicker
- Screenplay by: Arun Bharathi; Priya Thambi
- Directed by: Praveen Bennett
- Starring: Arun Prasath; Vinusha Devi; Roshini Haripriyan
- Theme music composer: Ilayavan (background score)
- Opening theme: "Bharathi Kadhaliyae Kannamma"
- Country of origin: India
- Original language: Tamil
- No. of seasons: 2
- No. of episodes: 1036

Production
- Producer: Ram Kumaradhas
- Cinematography: Saravanan; Venkatesh
- Editor: Vignesh Arjun
- Camera setup: Multi-camera
- Running time: approx.20-22 minutes per episode
- Production company: Global Villagers

Original release
- Network: Star Vijay
- Release: 25 February 2019 – 4 February 2023

Related
- Season 2

Bharathi Kannamma is a 2019 Indian Tamil-language television series that aired on Star Vijay and is available to stream on Disney+ Hotstar, directed by Praveen Bennett.

The first season of the series premiered on 25 February 2019 and ended on 4 February 2023. It is a remake of the Malayalam series Karuthamuthu and stars Roshini Haripriyan as Kannamma (who replaced by Vinusha Devi in 2022) with Arun Prasath as Bharathi, along with Farina Azad, Roopa Sree, Kanmani Manoharan and Agilan Pushparaj in supporting roles. Within a year the series took its generation loop of 8 years was introduced with same cast in addition to, Baby Raksha Shyam and Baby Lisha Rajkumar played Bharathi and Kanamma's twin daughters. The story follows Dr. Bharathi (Arun), who loves and marries a girl named Kannamma (Roshini). However, Bharathi's obsessed lover, Dr. Venba (Farina), vows to destroy Bharathi and Kannamma's relationship and marry Bharathi.

6 February 2023, the series completion of four years, a spin-off was introduced with the same title, premiering on 6 February 2023 starring Sibbu Suryan as Bharathi whilst Vinusha Devi and Farina Azad returned as Kannamma and Venba, along with Roopa Sree and Deepa Shankar in the supporting roles.

== Series overview ==
Season	No.of episodes	Original broadcast	
Season	No.of episodes	First aired	Last aired
1	1036	25 February 2019	4 February 2023
2	133	6 February 2023	6 August 2023

== Cast ==
=== Season 1 ===
- Roshini Haripriyan / Vinusha Devi as Kannamma – Shanmugam and Shenbagam's daughter; Baakiyalakshmi's step-daughter; Anjali's half-sister; Bharathi's wife; Lakshmi and Jr. Hema's mother. (2019–2021) / (2022–2023) (Dubbed By: Meenalochani)
- Arun Prasath as Dr. Bharathi – Soundarya and Venu's elder son; Shruti and Akhilan's brother; Hema's former love-interest; Kannamaa's husband; Lakshmi and Jr. Hema's father. (Dubbed By: Arun Kumar) (2019–2023)
- Raksha Shyam as Lakshmi – Bharathi and Kannamma's elder daughter; Hema's twin sister. (2020–2023)
- Lisha Rajkumar as Jr. Hema – Bharathi and Kannamma's younger daughter; Lakshmi's twin sister. (2020–2023)
- Roopa Sree as Soundarya – Venu's wife; Shruti, Bharathi and Akhilan's mother; Yazhini, Lakshmi, Jr. Hema and Aadhavan's grandmother. (2019–2023) (Dubbed By: Jayageetha)
- Rishi Keshav as Venu Gopalakrishnan – Soundarya's husband; Shruti, Bharathi and Akhilan's father; Yazhini, Lakshmi, Jr. Hema and Aadhavan's grandfather. (2019–2023)
- Kanmani Manoharan / Aruljothi Arockiaraj as Anjali – Shanmugam and Baakiyalakshmi's daughter; Kannamma's half-sister; Akhilan's wife; Aadhavan's mother. (2019–Jan.2022) / (Feb.2022–2023) (Dubbed By: Akshaya Prabha)
- Agilan Pushparaj / Sugesh Rajendran as Akhilan – Soundarya and Venu's younger son; Shruti and Bharathi's brother; Anjali's husband; Aadhavan's father. (2019–Aug.2021) / (2021–2023) (Dubbed By: Vignesh a.k.a. Vicky)
- Kaavya Arivumani as Arivumani – Soundarya's niece; Shruti, Bharathi, Akhilan's cousin. (2019–2020)
- Shruthi Shanmugapriya as Shruthi – Soundarya and Venu's daughter; Bharathi and Akhilan's sister; Yazhini's mother. (2019–2020)
- Sabarinathan as Rohit – Venba's husband. (2022–2023)
- Sherin Jaanu as Thulasi – A former nurse at Bharathi's hospital, Kanamma's friend. (2020–2022)
- Venkatesh / Muthu Kumara Swamy as Shanmugam – Shenbagam's widower; Baakiyalakshmi's husband; Kannamma and Anjali's father; Lakshmi, Jr. Hema and Aadhavan's grandfather. (2019–2021) / (2021–2023)
- Senthi Kumari as Baakiyalakshmi – Anbukarasi's daughter; Selva's sister; Shanmugam's second wife; Anjali's mother; Kannamma's step-mother; Aadhavan's grandmother; Lakshmi and Jr. Hema's step-grandmother. (2019–2022)
- Rajkumar Manoharan as Selva Ganapathy – Anbukarasi's son; Baakiyalakshmi's brother. (2019–2023)
- Vijayalakshmi as Anbukarasi – Baakiyalakshmi and Selva's mother; Anjali's grandmother. (2019–2020) (Dead)
- Rekha as Sharmila – Venba's mother. (2022–2023)
- Bharath Kalyan as Vikram – Owner of Vikram Babu Hospital; Soundarya and Venu's colleague. (2020–2022)
- Praveen Devasagayam as "Killer" Durga – Venba's henchman. (2020–2022)
- Neepa as Sumathi – Kannamaa's house owner. (2021)
- Revathee Shankar as Gayatri – Venu's sister. (2019–2020)
- Uma Rani as Shenbagavalli – Soundarya's friend; Manimegalai's mother. (2019–2020)
- Pushpa Vetriselvan as Santhi – Venba's housekeeper. (2019–2022)
- Minor Yogi as Maayandi – Nirmala's husband; Baakiyalakshmi's henchman. (2019–2022)
- Subageetha as Nirmala – Maayandi's wife; Anjali's caretaker. (2019–2021)
- M. J. Shriram as Venba's uncle (2019–2020) (Dead)
- Balaji Babu as Kumar – Kannamaa's auto-driver. (2020–2022)
- Arandhangi Nisha as Advocate Vadivukkarasi aka Vadivu – Kannamma's neighbour. (2021–2022)
- Thamarai Selvi as Thamarai (2022–2023)

=== Mahasangamam Pandian Stores ===
- Stalin Muthu as Sathyamoorthy aka Moorthy – Lakshmi and Pandian's eldest son; Jeeva, Kathir and Kannan's brother; Dhanam's husband. (2020)
- Sujitha as Dhanalakshmi aka Dhanam – Varadarajan and Kamakshi's daughter; Jaga's sister; Moorthy's wife. (2020)
- Venkat Renganathan as Jeevanandham aka Jeeva – Lakshmi and Pandian's second son; Moorthy, Kathir and Kannan's brother; Meena's husband. (2020)
- Hema Rajkumar as Meenatchi aka Meena – Janarthanan's elder daughter; Jeeva's wife. (2020)
- Kumaran Thangarajan as Kathiravan aka Kathir – Lakshmi and Pandian's third son; Moorthy, Jeeva and Kannan's brother; Mullai's husband. (2020)
- V. J. Chitra as Mullai as Mullai Kathiravan - Muruganandham and Parvathy's younger daughter; Malli's sister; Aishu's cousin; Kathir's wife. (2020)
- Saravana Vickram as Jayakannan aka Kannan – Lakshmi and Pandian's youngest son; Moorthy, Jeeva and Kathir's brother. (2020;2023)

=== Mahasangamam Raja Rani 2 ===
- Alya Manasa (2021) / Riya Vishwanathan (2022) as Sandhya: Saravanan's wife
- Sidhu Sid as Saravanan: Sandhya's husband, Ravi and Sivagami's elder son; Senthil, Parvathy and Aaditya's elder brother. (2021–2022)
- Praveena as Sivagami: Ravi's wife; Saravanan, Senthil, Parvathy and Aaditya's mother. (2021–2022)
- Saivam Ravi as Ravi Sundaram: Sivagami's husband, Saravanan, Senthil, Parvathy and Aaditya's father. (2021–2022)
- Balaji Thiyagarajan Dayalan as Senthil: Archana's husband, Ravi and Sivagami's second son, Saravanan's younger brother and Parvathy, Aaditya's elder brother. (2021–2022)
- Archana Ravichandran as Archana: Senthil's wife.
- Vaishnavi Sundar as Parvathy: Bhaskar's wife, Ravi and Sivagami's daughter, Saravanan and Senthil's younger sister and Aaditya's elder sister (2021–2022)
- VJ Prathosh as Aditya: Ravi and Sivagami's younger son, Saravanan, Senthil and Parvathy's younger brother. (2021–2022)
- Ashwin Kannan as Bhaskar: Parvathy's husband. (2022)
- Unknown as Selvam: A terrorist and former worker at Saravanan's sweet shop (2022)

=== Special appearances ===
- Snehan as himself (2019; 2023)
- Deepa Shankar as Shenbagam – Shanmugam's first wife; Kannamma's mother; Lakshmi and Jr. Hema's grandmother. (2019) (Dead)
- Kaaka Muttai Shanthi Mani as Paatti (Episode 3) (2019)
- Preethi Sanjeev as Vadivambal - Kannamaa's cousin. (2019)
- Arunraja Kamaraj as himself – Bharathi's friend. (2019)
- Alya Manasa as Dr. Hema – A cardiologist; Bharathi's colleague and former love-interest. (2019) (Dead)
- Manimegalai as Manimegalai – Shenbagavalli's daughter; Bharathi's proposed bride. (2020)
- Raju Jeyamohan as Varun Mohan – A poet; Kannamma's classmate and best friend. (2020)
- Madhumitha Illayaraja as Meenatchi - Akhilan's friend. (2020)
- Madurai Mohan as Natraj – A hand carter. (2020)
- Chenniamma as Petchiamma – Natraj's wife. (2020)
- Rohini as Veni – An owner in petrol bunk. (2020)
- Jeya Lakshmi – An incharge in an orphanage. (2020)
- Vasu Vikram as Mahalingam – Kannamma's MD in a tailoring departmental store. (2020)
- Babitha Jose as Maheshwari Mahalingam – Soundarya's friend; Mahalingam's wife. (2020)
- Yuvan Pattison as Prasad – Bharathi's friend; Mahalingam and Maheshwari's son. (2020)
- KPY Pazhani as Pazhani – Kannamma's neighbour. (2020)
- Nilani as Seetha – Pazhani's wife; Kannamma's friend based in Thiruvallur. (2020)
- Jeyanthi as an IAS officer. (2021)
- Salma Arun as Dr. Priya – Bharathi's friend. (2021)
- Aari Arujunan as himself (2021)
- Sivaangi Krishnakumar as herself (2021)
- Suresh Chakravarty as himself (2021)
- KPY Bala as himself (2021)
- Archana Chandhoke as herself (2021)
- Sona Nair as a Judge of Court (2021)
- Nakshatra Nagesh as Saraswathi (2022)
- Sasilaya as IPS Sasikala (2022)
- Ajay Ratnam as Police IG (during terrorists hijacks hospital) (2022)
- Kiruba as Hema's mother (2022)
- Shobanaa Uthaman as herself (2023)
- Ashwini Aanandita as herself (2023)
- Deepak Dinkar as himself (2023)
- Navin Vetri as himself (2023)
- Dharshna Sripal Golecha as herself (2023)
- Swathi Konde as herself (2023)
- Kannika Ravi as herself (2023)
- RJ Balaji as himself (2023)
- Shivin Ganesan as herself (2023)
- K. S. Suchitra Shetty as Baakiyalakshmi (2023)
- Meena Sellamuthu as Selvi (2023)

== Production ==
=== Filming ===
Due to the COVID-19 pandemic, Bharathi Kannamma, and all other Indian television series and films production were suspended on 19 March 2020. Three months later, shooting was permitted and the team commenced filming in July. The show commenced telecasting new episodes from 27 July 2020. With the increase in Covid cases in Tamil Nadu, production was again suspended for a few days in mid-May 2021.

=== Crossover episodes ===
In January 2020, Bharathi Kannamma had a crossover with Pandian Stores for a week. It also had a crossover with Raja Rani 2 during March 2021 for three weeks and a day (Raja Rani S2 E-108 to E-126). With the suspension in mid-May 2021 and with a few cast availability then for bank episodes, the series crossed over with Raja Rani 2. Again in 2022, the series joined Mahasangamam with Raja Rani 2.

== Reception ==
=== Viewership and ratings ===
Beginning with an average viewership and trp of 5.53, after a year, In September 2020, the sequence of the series where lead Kannamma leaves the house, the series gained viewership and entering top five Tamil television programs. In week 37 of 2020, it became the third-most watched Tamil soap for the first time, garnering 8.254 million impressions and the second Star Vijay program to enter the top five. However, in week 21 of 2021 when the rival channel Sun TV's top rated soap Roja shifted against Bharathi Kannamma. During Week 32, Bharathi Kannamma defeated Roja by a margin of 2TVR across Urban and Urban+Rural markets, repeatedly leading in the slot.

== Spin-off ==
=== Bharathi Kannamma 2 ===
It premiered on Star Vijay on 6 February 2023 from Monday to Saturday at 21:00 and is also available on the digital platform on Disney+ Hotstar. The spin-off stars Sibbu Suryan as Bharathi while Vinusha Devi as Kannamma. Along with Roopa Sree and Deepa Shankar in the supporting roles.
