= Vadinamma =

- Genre: Drama
- Written by: S.Siva Sekar; Priya Thambi
- Directed by: Vasavi Kanth
- Starring: Sujitha; Prabhakar
- Country of origin: India
- Original language: Telugu
- No. of seasons: 1
- No. of episodes: 808

Production
- Producer: Prabhakar
- Cinematography: G. Jayagopla Reddy
- Editor: Mohammad Ajaruddin
- Running time: 22 minutes
- Production company: Sri Sumanohara Production Pvt Ltd

Original release
- Network: Star Maa
- Release: 6 May 2019 – 21 March 2022

Related
- Pandian Stores

Vadinamma (transl. Sister-in-Law) is an Indian Telugu-language television drama series which airs on Star Maa and streams on Disney+ Hotstar . The series premiered on 6 May 2019. This is a remake of Tamil series Pandian Stores airing on Star Vijay. It stars Sujitha (reprising her role from the original Tamil version), Prabhakar, Rajesh Dutta, Maheshwari, Raj and Priyanka. After running for three years the serial ended on 21 March 2022.

== Plot ==
It mainly focuses on the unity of a joint family headed by Sita and Raghuram, after the entry of new daughters-in-law, Shailu, Siri and Shilpa.

== Cast ==
=== Main ===
- Sujitha Dhanush as Seetha Mahalakshmi: Susheela's daughter; Bhaskar's sister; Raghuram's wife; Rishi's mother
  - Krithika as Child Seetha
- Prabhakar as Raghuram: Gowri Shankar's son; Rajeshwari's step-son; Lakshman, Bharat and Nani's half-brother; Seetha's husband; Rishi's father
- Sravan Rajesh Dutta / Unknown as Lakshman: Rajeshwari and Gowri Shankar's eldest son; Bharat and Nani's brother; Raghuram's half-brother; Shailu's husband; Rishi's adoptive father
  - Shourya as Child Lakshman
- Maheshwari as Shailaja aka Shailu: Janardhan and Subadhra's daughter; Lakshman's wife; Rishi's adoptive mother
- Raj as Bharat: Rajeshwari and Gowri Shankar's second son; Lakshman and Nani's brother; Raghuram's half-brother; Siri's husband; Vaidehi's father
  - Chakri as Child Bharath
- Priyanka Naidu as Siri: Parvathi and Satyamurthy's daughter; Bharat's wife; Vaidehi's mother
- Ganesh Reddy as Nani: Rajeshwari and Gowri Shankar's youngest son; Bharat and Lakshman's brother; Raghuram's half-brother; Shilpa's husband
- Suji Thammishetty as Shilpa: Damayanti and Rajasekhar's younger daughter; Kalpana and Kishore's sister; Nani's wife

=== Recurring ===
- Sujatha Reddy as Rajeshwari: Gowri Shankar's widow; Lakshman, Bharat and Nani's mother; Raghuram's step-mother; Vaidehi's grandmother; Rishi's step-grandmother
- Shiva Parvathy / Rajyalakshmi / Nirmala Reddy as Parvathy: Satyamurthy's wife; Siri's mother; Vaidehi's grandmother
- Bhargav Rao as Sathyamurthy: Parvathy's husband; Siri's father; Vaidehi's grandfather
- Chitram Srinu as Papa Rao: Vijaya's husband; Baby's father
- Usha Sri as Vijaya: Papa Rao's wife; Baby's mother
- Rajendra as MLA Janardhan: Subadhra's husband; Shailu's father
- Kondaveeti Sangeetha as Damayanti: Rajasekar's wife; Shilpa, Kalpana and Kishore's mother (2021–2022)
- Naveena as Subadhra: Janardhan's wife; Shailu's mother
- Manjula Paritala as Amrutha: Raghuram's relative and fake wife; Varshita's mother
- Unknown as Kishore: Damayanti and Rajasekar's son; Kalpana and Shilpa's brother
- Baby Nandhita as Varshita: Amrutha's daughter; Raghuram's fake daughter
- Unknown as Kalpana: Damayanti and Rajasekar's elder daughter; Kishore and Shilpa's sister; Avinash's wife
- Unknown as Avinash: Kalpana's husband
- Unknown as Susheela: Bhaskar and Seetha's mother; Rishi's grandmother
- Vijay Bhargav as Bhaskar: Susheela's son; Seetha's brother; Durga's husband; Raghuram's best friend
- Madhulika as Durga: Bhaskar's wife

=== Cameo appearance ===
- Amardeep Chowdary as Rama
- Sreeharsha Chaganti as Abhi
- Krishna Koushik as Raja Gopal
- Madhavi Latha as Raja Gopal's wife

== Production ==
In late March 2020, the production and broadcasting of the series halted along with all other Indian television series and films owing COVID-19 outbreak in India. It resumed after three months in June 2020.

== Reception ==
=== Critics ===
The Times of India stated, "The old wine in a new bottle that celebrates middle class family emotions has struck a chord with the masses."

=== Viewership and ratings ===
The series became one of the top five watched Telugu GEC after its time change from afternoon 3:00 pm (IST) to night 7:00 pm (IST) in June 2019 until again being shifted from 7:00 pm in week 49, 2020 despite being in top 3. As in December 2019, it was at second position with ratings more than about 15 TVR after Karthika Deepam.

Week and year	BARC viewership (Telugu GEC)		Ref(s)
Week and year	Impressions (in millions)	Ranking	Ref(s)
Week 31, 2019	8.04	3	
Week 43, 2019	10.36	2	
Week 49, 2019	10.72	2	
Week 50, 2019	10.44	2	
Week 8, 2020	8.50	3	
Week 28, 2020	7.23	3	
Week 33, 2020	8.61	4	
Week 37, 2020	9.72	3	
Week 42, 2020	10.82	3	
Week 44, 2020	10.39	3	
Week 46, 2020	9.80	3	
Week 48, 2020	9.87	3	

== Adaptations ==
Language	Title	Original release	Network(s)	Last aired	Notes
Tamil	Pandian Stores பாண்டியன் ஸ்டோர்ஸ்	1 October 2018	Star Vijay	28 October 2023	Original
Telugu	Vadinamma వదినమ్మ	6 May 2019	Star Maa	21 March 2022	Remake
Kannada	Varalakshmi Stores ವರಲಕ್ಷ್ಮಿ ಸ್ಟೋರೀಸ್	17 June 2019	Star Suvarna	16 April 2020	Remake
Marathi	Sahkutumb Sahparivar सहकुटुंब सहपरिवार	24 February 2020	Star Pravah	3 August 2023	Remake
Bengali	Bhaggolokkhi ভাগ্যলক্ষী	31 August 2020	Star Jalsha	21 March 2021	Remake
Malayalam	Santhwanam സാന്ത്വനം	21 September 2020	Asianet	27 January 2024	Remake
Hindi	Gupta Brothers गुप्ता ब्रदर्स	5 October 2020	Star Bharat	26 January 2021	Remake
Hindi	Pandya Store पंड्या स्टोर	25 January 2021	StarPlus	26 May 2024	Remake
Kannada	Ananda Nilaya ಆನಂದ ನಿಲಯ	10 August 2026	Star Suvarna	Ongoing	Remake
