= Sahkutumb Sahparivar =

Indian television series

- Genre: Family drama
- Written by: Kiran Kulkarni; Pallavi Karkera; Sandip Vishwasrao
- Directed by: Bharat Gaikwad
- Starring: See below
- Theme music composer: Rohan-Rohan
- Opening theme: "Sahkutumb Sahparivar" by Prasenjit Kosambi and Rupali Moghe
- Country of origin: India
- Original language: Marathi
- No. of episodes: 1000

Production
- Producers: Ranjit Thakur; Hemant Ruprell
- Production locations: Mumbai, Maharashtra, India
- Camera setup: Multi-camera
- Running time: 22 minutes
- Production company: Frames Production

Original release
- Network: Star Pravah
- Release: 24 February 2020 – 3 August 2023

Related
- Pandian Stores

Sahkutumb Sahparivar (transl. With the Family, With the Household) is an Indian Marathi language television series that aired on Star Pravah. It is an official remake of Tamil TV series Pandian Stores. It stars Sunil Barve and Nandita Patkar in lead roles. The show is produced by Ranjit Thakur and Hemant Ruparel under the banner of Frames Production.

== Plot ==
The show revolves around Sarita and Suryakant, the owner of a Jay Bhawani departmental store, and his family. The show is describing importance of family and their relationships. Suryakant is the head of the family. He has three younger brothers, Vaibhav, Omkar and Prashant. These three brothers and their mother lead a happy life. Suryakant marries Sarita.

Sarita decides not to have children and wants to take care of Suryakant's brothers. She takes care of everyone in the family and is always there for them. Circumstances later lead to Vaibhav marrying Avni and Prashant marrying Anjali. The series follows Sarita as she holds the family together and faces various obstacles to keep the household running smoothly.

== Cast ==
=== Main ===
- Sunil Barve as Suryakant "Surya" More – Owner of Bhawani Stores; Laxmi's eldest son; Vaibhav, Prashant and Omkar's brother; Sarita's husband; Kshitij's father. He is strict but kind man who supports his family by sacrificing his own wishes.
- Nandita Patkar as Sarita "Sari" More – Suryakant's wife; Kshitij's mother. She is kind, generous and strives to keep the family united and like a mother-figure to Vaibhav, Prashant and Omkar.

=== Recurring ===
- Amey Barve / Nimish Kulkarni as Vaibhav "Vaibhya" More – Laxmi's second son; Suryakant, Prashant and Omkar's brother; Avni's husband; Sakhi's father. He is educated and smart and he supports his family by opposing his wife.
- Sakshi Gandhi as Avni More – Sarjerao's daughter; Vaibhav's wife; Sakhi's mother. She tries to get adjusted in the family as she belongs to a rich family, but continuously fails and insults others but she is clean by heart.
- Akash Nalawade as Prashant "Pashya" More – Laxmi's third son; Suryakant, Vaibhav and Omkar's brother; Anjali's husband, Jay’s father. He has a love hate relationship with Anji but he always supports her. He is an illiterate and dumb guy.
- Komal Kumbhar as Anjali "Anji" Dhawale More – Asha and Dhananjay's daughter; Prashant's wife, Jay’s mother. She has love-hate relationship with Prashant but she always supports him.
- Akash Shinde as Omkar "Onkya" More – Laxmi's youngest son; Suryakant, Vaibhav and Prashant's brother; Pooja's husband. He is mischievous but is loyal to his brothers.
- Pooja Purandare as Pooja More – Omkar's wife.
- Annapurna Bhairi / Anukamal as Laxmi More – Suryakant, Vaibhav, Prashant and Omkar's mother; Sakhi, Kshitija & Jay’s grandmother. She was a paralyzed lady.
- Kishori Ambiye as Asha Dhawale – Dhananjay's wife; Anjali's mother; Sarita's aunt. She hates More Family especially Sarita and Prashant.
- Santosh Patil / Mahesh Ghag as Dhananjay Dhawale – Asha's husband; Anjali's father; Sarita's uncle.
- Bhagyashri Pawar as Guddi – Anjali's friend; Sarita's sister-figure. She always supports Sarita and Anji.
- Sayali Sambhare as Kavita – Govind's wife. She also hates Sarita and supports Mami in her plans.
- Bhushan Patil as Sarjerao – Avni's father; Sakhi's grandfather. He is a rich politician. He hates the More family because he thinks they have brainwashed his daughter to marry Vaibhav and therefore she married him.
- Suhas Paranjpe as Akkasaheb – Sarjerao's sister; Avni's aunt. She hates the More family like Sarjerao and tries to create a misunderstanding between them.
- Shweta Mehendale as Jyoti – Anjali's cousin.
- Ruturaj Phadake as Mihir – Anjali's friend from US.

== Reception ==
=== Ratings ===
Week	Year	BARC Viewership		Ref.
Week	Year	TRP	Rank	Ref.
Week 38	2020	3.7	2	
Week 39	2020	4.0	2	
Week 40	2020	3.8	3	
Week 41	2020	3.5	5	
Week 42	2020	3.7	4	
Week 43	2020	4.2	5	
Week 44	2020	4.6	4	
Week 45	2020	4.1	4	
Week 47	2020	4.4	4	
Week 48	2020	4.6	5	
Week 50	2020	4.4	5	
Week 52	2020	4.9	5	
Week 1	2021	4.2	5	
Week 3	2021	4.0	3	
Week 4	2021	4.1	4	
Week 5	2021	4.1	3	
Week 6	2021	3.9	4	
Week 7	2021	3.6	5	
Week 8	2021	3.6	5	

== Awards ==
Star Pravah Parivar Puraskar
Year	Category	Recipient	Roles
2021	Best Sister-in-law	Nandita Patkar	Sarita
2021	Best Family		More Family
2022	Best Costumes		More Family
2022	Best Siblings	Sunil Barve, Amey Barve, Akash Nalawade, Akash Shinde	Suryakant, Vaibhav, Prashant, Omkar

== Adaptations ==
Language	Title	Original release	Network(s)	Last aired	Notes
Tamil	Pandian Stores பாண்டியன் ஸ்டோர்ஸ்	1 October 2018	Star Vijay	28 October 2023	Original
Telugu	Vadinamma వదినమ్మ	6 May 2019	Star Maa	21 March 2022	Remake
Kannada	Varalakshmi Stores ವರಲಕ್ಷ್ಮಿ ಸ್ಟೋರೀಸ್	17 June 2019	Star Suvarna	16 April 2020	Remake
Marathi	Sahkutumb Sahparivar सहकुटुंब सहपरिवार	24 February 2020	Star Pravah	3 August 2023	Remake
Bengali	Bhaggolokkhi ভাগ্যলক্ষী	31 August 2020	Star Jalsha	21 March 2021	Remake
Malayalam	Santhwanam സാന്ത്വനം	21 September 2020	Asianet	27 January 2024	Remake
Hindi	Gupta Brothers गुप्ता ब्रदर्स	5 October 2020	Star Bharat	26 January 2021	Remake
Hindi	Pandya Store पंड्या स्टोर	25 January 2021	StarPlus	26 May 2024	Remake
Kannada	Ananda Nilaya ಆನಂದ ನಿಲಯ	10 August 2026	Star Suvarna	Ongoing	Remake
