= Meet Mukhi =

Indian film and television child actor (born 2005)

- Years active: 2011–present
- Known for: Bal Gopal Kare Dhamaal; Gupta Brothers
- Website: https://meetmukhi.in

Meet Mukhi is an Indian film and television child actor who acts in television shows and advertisement commercials. He also appeared in the feature films My Friend Pinto, Rowdy Rathore and Torbaaz.

== Career ==
Mukhi started his career as a television actor with the role of Sonu Prakash Shrivastav in Colors TV series Kairi — Rishta Khatta Meetha. He played the role of inspector's son in the movie Rowdy Rathore. Later in the year, he had a role in the Sapne Suhane Ladakpan Ke serial.

Mukhi played one of the main roles in Bal Gopal Kare Dhamaal, with Satyajit Sharma playing the other. He joined the Baal Krishna team to play the lead role of young Krishna.

Mukhi appeared in an episode of the Savdhaan India, which aired on 14 February 2018.

From October 2020–January 2021, he played the role of the youngest Gupta Brother, Rajat Narayan Gupta, in Star Bharat's Gupta Brothers.

In 2018, he played Subodh in Vighnaharta Ganesh, and in 2021 he returned to play Young Tulsidas in the same show.

== Filmography ==
=== Films ===
Year	Title	Role	Notes
2011	My Friend Pinto	Young Michael Pinto	
2012	Rowdy Rathore	Inspector Vishal Sharma's son	

Year	Title	Role	Notes
2023	Hi Nana	Varsha 's younger brother	

=== Television ===
Year	Title	Role	Notes
2012	Kairi — Rishta Khatta Meetha	Sonu Prakash Shrivastav	
2012	Sapne Suhane Ladakpan Ke	Dholu	
2014–2015	Bal Gopal Kare Dhamaal	Young Lord Krishna	
2015–2016	Sankatmochan Mahabali Hanuman	Young Lord Ram	Recurring role
2016–2017	Baal Krishna	Young Lord Krishna	
2018	Savdhaan India	Suraj	Episode 2373
2018	Vighnaharta Ganesh	Young Tulsidas / Subodh	Special appearance
2019–2020	Shakti - Astitva Ke Ehsaas Ki	Rohan	
2020–2021	Gupta Brothers	Rajat Narayan Gupta	
2022	Bade Achhe Lagte Hain 2	Ishaan	

=== Web series ===
Year	Title	Role	Notes
2023	Fireflies: Parth Aur Jugnu	Parth	

== YouTube shows ==
Year	Title	Role	Notes
2018–present	Dhar Mann	Jayden Miller & Kevin	
September 2023 - February 2024	Mischief Mikey	Jayden Miller	
