= Gupta Brothers =

Indian comedy drama TV series

- Also known as: Gupta Brothers - Chaar Kunware From Ganga Kinaare
- Genre: Dramedy
- Created by: Mahesh Pandey
- Developed by: Mahesh Pandey
- Screenplay by: Agastya Jain; Vikram Khurana
- Story by: Dilip Jha; Dheeraj Sarna
- Directed by: Rrahul Mevawala
- Creative directors: Trivendra Singh, Shikhar Jaiswal
- Starring: Parineeta Borthakur; Hiten Tejwani; Akash Mukherjee; Satya Tiwari; Meet Mukhi
- Theme music composer: Chirag Jain; Om Jha; Esha Gaur; Puneet Dixit
- Opening theme: Ek Doosre Se Karte Hain Pyar Hum
- Country of origin: India
- Original language: Hindi
- No. of seasons: 1
- No. of episodes: 81

Production
- Producers: Mahesh Pandey; Madhu Pandey
- Cinematography: Shahid Khan; Asif Khan
- Camera setup: Multi-camera
- Running time: 21–23 minutes
- Production company: Mahesh Pandey Productions LLP

Original release
- Network: Star Bharat
- Release: 5 October 2020 – 26 January 2021

Related
- Pandian Stores; Pandya Store

Gupta Brothers is an Indian comedy drama television series that aired from 5 October 2020 to 26 January 2021 on Star Bharat. Produced by Mahesh Pandey, it stars Parineeta Borthakur, Hiten Tejwani, Aakash Mukherjee, Satya Tiwari and Meet Mukhi. This show was the first official Hindi television remake of the Tamil television series Pandian Stores by Star India.

== Plot ==
The show opens with a family of four bachelor brothers, Shiv, Alok, Veeru and Rajat, living in Banaras. They are well-versed in many things, from doing household chores to managing a business in a local grocery store; as a result, the four brothers are called the Sarvagun Sampann Gupta Brothers in their neighborhood. The four brothers are self-reliant and feel a woman is unnecessary, deciding to remain unmarried. However, when a character named Ganga creates a fake identity and enters the lives of the Gupta Brothers, their worlds turn upside-down.

All four brothers try to get rid of her, while simultaneously trying to discover the truth. Shiv discovers that Ganga is an orphan and develops a soft spot for her, forgiving her despite her misdeeds against the brothers. Ganga is amazed by Shiv's kindness and instantly takes a liking for him, which soon develops into love. However, Shiv, unaware of Ganga's feelings, decides to get her married to another man, which Ganga accepts brokenheartedly. On the day of the wedding, the groom elopes; Shiv then marries Ganga to save her honor. Shiv and Ganga's marriage leaves Alok, Veeru and Rajat shattered, causing a rift to form between Shiv and the three. They decide never to accept Ganga as their brother's wife.

=== 7 days later ===
Alok, Veeru, and Rajat arrange Shiv and Ganga's nuptial night, where Ganga decides to delay starting a family until Shiv's brothers, who Ganga now considers as her own children, are completely settled. Shiv is taken aback, but respects and accepts Ganga's bold decision.

=== 6 months later ===
The Gupta family is now a happy family, and the three younger Gupta brothers see Shiv and Ganga as their parents. During a festive moment, Shiv and Ganga notice Alok and a character named Jaya's closeness and wonder about the nature of their relationship. Once asked, Jaya reveals that she has been in love with Alok since childhood and believes that Alok, a changed man now, reciprocates her feelings. This leads Shiv and Ganga to mistakenly believe that Alok and Jaya love each other and, though he is initially reluctant, Shiv decides to marry off Alok and Jaya for his brother's happiness. It is then revealed that Alok loves another girl, Aditi, the daughter of one of their rich dealers Bansal. Upon learning more about Bansal, Alok brokenheartedly decides to marry Jaya. He breaks up with Aditi, lying and claiming that his love for her was fake. On the day of Alok and Jaya's marriage, Aditi learns that Jaya's father intentionally ended hers and Alok's relationship, so she decides to win him back. She escapes from her house and emotionally blackmails Alok by threatening to commit suicide if he doesn't marry her. Helpless, Alok marries Aditi, shattering Jaya and her family. To secure Jaya's future, Ganga asks Veeru to marry Jaya, which both of them oppose, as they have always hated each other. However, in the end, for the sake of the happiness of their families, Veeru and Jaya agree to marry each other. Thus, Alok marries Aditi, while Veeru marries Jaya.

After Alok and Veeru's marriages, Ganga and Shiv struggle to keep their family united as constant issues crop up between Aditi and Jaya because Aditi is always insecure about Jaya's presence. Aditi also has difficulty adjusting to a middle-class lifestyle, as she has always led a luxurious life. Veeru and Jaya often argue with each other. Ganga and Shiv work hard to keep the unity of the family, but Amba still strives to divide them.

Thus, Amba instigates Bansal, who wants his daughter and son-in-law to live with him. Amba herself was using Bansal, as she wants her daughter, Jaya, to live a queen's life in the Gupta family. Provoked by Amba, Bansal stops all his supplies to the Gupta & Sons grocery store. This causes a major loss for the Guptas, so Shiv decides to get help from acquaintances of Mirzapur. In Shiv's Absence, a man named Mishra, who is helping Amba, offers help to the Gupta family. Alok declines to accept the offer. However, Veeru, to help his family and to prove himself to Jaya, who considers him to be good-for-nothing, accepts Mishra's offer.

Amba's plan succeeds and the Health Inspectors inspect the stale and expired products in Gupta & Sons grocery store and seal it. The Guptas are devastated, and things go downhill when the police arrest Alok for the foodborne illness caused by Gupta & Sons' expired products. Shiv and Veeru try to save Alok by getting arrested instead of him, but Alok stops his brothers and gets arrested, taking full responsibility for the foodborne illness. While Shiv and Veeru try to get Alok released, Ganga reaches out to Bansal for help. Bansal says that he will help Ganga if she allows Aditi and Alok to live with him. Ganga, angry that Bansal considers familial relationships as business, declines. As Ganga leaves, Bansal realizes that Aditi had overheard the entire conversation. Bansal tries to emotionally blackmail her, but Aditi confronts him for all his evil acts against her family and vows that she will break all ties with her father if he ever tries to plot against them.

Later, Ganga, Shiv and Veeru make up with the foodborne illness victims' families and help Alok get released from jail. At the same time, Jaya catches Mishra, proving the Guptas' innocence. The whole Gupta family rejoice at overcoming the great trouble in their family. However, things are still unstable between Aditi and Jaya, with Jaya believing the main culprit behind all the problems in the Gupta family to be Bansal instead of Amba. Aditi is insecure due to Alok and Jaya's proximity. However, Aditi, aware of her father's misdeeds, accepts the Guptas, forming a cordial relationship with everyone except for Jaya. Tensions are also present between Veeru and Jaya.

Ganga and Shiv send the newly-weds on their honeymoon. During their honeymoon, Veeru and Jaya have a huge brawl in the hotel, causing Jaya to leave the room saddened and annoyed. She is about to endanger herself when Alok saves her and promises Jaya that he will be always at her side as a friend. Aditi eavesdrops on their conversation. She then calls Veeru and questions his wife's character. In the hotel room, Veeru assures Aditi that he trusts Jaya, having known of her friendship with Alok since childhood. This improves the relationship between Veeru and Jaya somewhat. Meanwhile, Aditi confesses to Alok how insecure she is about his and Jaya's relationship, saying that she wants Alok to prove his loyalty to her.

In Banaras, Ganga and Shiv are called for a baby shower ceremony, where Ganga is criticized for being childless. Rajat retaliates by calling Ganga Bhabhi-maa and affirming that Ganga is also his mother. Later, Ganga and Shiv decide to renovate and enlarge their house for the comfort of the newly-weds. During the puja of house renovation, Aditi, Alok, Veeru, and Jaya surprise everyone with their return. The Gupta family is overjoyed when Aditi tells them she is pregnant, except for Jaya, who feels like she is being ignored by Aditi. Her dejection increases as Amba poisons her mind more. Jaya takes out her frustration on Veeru, saying her life is destroyed by marrying him. Veeru is heartbroken by Jaya's words and believes divorce will make her happy. Amba tries to kill Aditi's unborn child by poisoning her food. Jaya learns about her mother's plan and saves Aditi, breaking all ties with her mother. After this, Alok and Veeru decides to divorce their wives. To save their family and keep them united, Shiv and Ganga pretend that they've decided to separate. Aditi, Alok, Jaya, and Veeru decide to stop Shiv and Ganga from separating, causing them to realise their mistakes. Veeru and Jaya confess their feelings, and Jaya and Aditi mend their relationship. Shiv and Ganga reveal what their plan had been and all of them live happily ever after.

== Cast ==
=== Main ===
- Parineeta Borthakur as Ganga Gupta – Shiv's wife and Alok, Veeru and Rajat's mother figure (2020–2021)
- Hiten Tejwani as Shiv Gupta – Narayan and Lakshmi's eldest son; eldest brother and father to Alok, Veeru, and Rajat; husband of Ganga (2020–2021)

=== Recurring ===
- Akash Mukherjee as Alok Gupta – Narayan and Lakshmi's second son, Shiv's younger brother, Veeru and Rajat's older brother, and husband of Aditi (2020–2021)
- Aishwarya Raj Bhakuni as Aditi Bansal Gupta – Bansal's daughter and Alok's wife (2020–2021)
- Satya Tiwari as Veeru Gupta – Narayan and Lakshmi's third son, Shiv and Alok's younger brother, Rajat's older brother, and Jaya's husband.(2020–2021)
- Sonal Vengurlekar as Jaya Satya Prakash Gupta – Satya Prakash and Amba's daughter, Alok's ex-fiancé, and Veeru's wife (2020–2021)
- Meet Mukhi as Rajat Gupta – Narayan and Lakshmi's youngest son and Shiv, Alok, and Veeru's younger brother (2020–2021)
- Rinku Dhawan as Amba Satya Prakash – Satya Prakash's wife and Jaya's mother (2020–2021)
- Deepak Dutta as Satya Prakash – Amba's husband and Jaya's father (2020–2021)
- Darpan Shrivastava as Bansal – Aditi's father (2020–2021)
- Aditi Deshpande as Lakshmi Gupta – Narayan's second wife; Alok, Veeru and Rajat's mother; and Shiv's step-mother (2020)
- Jairoop Jeevan as Narayan Gupta – Owner of Gupta & Sons grocery store, Gayatri and Lakshmi's husband, and Shiv, Alok, Veeru, and Rajat's father (2020–2021) (Dead)
- Sanjay Pandey as Radhe Shyam Rasiya aka John Jani Janardhan – The Gupta brothers' former rival (2020)
- Surya Rao as Inspector Bharat Videshi (2020)
- Roma Navani as Kamini's mother (2020)
- Bhoomika Mirchandani as Kamini – Alok's fake lover and ex-fiancé (2020)

== Production ==
=== Development ===
In January 2020, StarPlus planned an official Hindi remake of Star Vijay's Tamil series Pandian Stores, which was to be produced by Mahesh Pandey Productions with the title Khandaan. After the title was changed to Hum– Ek Makaan Ek Dukaan, filming began in February 2020, with portions shot in Varanasi. Shooting was halted in March 2020 due to the COVID-19 pandemic. After the lockdown, the series was shifted to Star Bharat, which changed its programming genre to comedy from drama; as a result, the plot was changed. Filming began again in July 2020 post-COVID break and the show was aired with the title Gupta Brothers - Chaar Kunware From Ganga Kinaare on 5 October 2020 as a dramedy series.

=== Release ===
The first promo of the series was released on 24 September 2020.

The next promo was released on 7 October 2020.

=== Cancellation ===
In December 2020, StarPlus announced another Hindi remake of Pandian Stores titled Pandya Store produced by Sphere Origins, which premiered on 25 January 2021.

With the launch of the second official Hindi remake of Pandian Stores, the first official Hindi remake Gupta Brothers was announced to go off the air on 5 February. Gupta Brothers went off-air abruptly on 26 January, earlier than the announced date.

== Adaptations ==
Language	Title	Original release	Network(s)	Last aired	Notes
Tamil	Pandian Stores பாண்டியன் ஸ்டோர்ஸ்	1 October 2018	Star Vijay	28 October 2023	Original
Telugu	Vadinamma వదినమ్మ	6 May 2019	Star Maa	21 March 2022	Remake
Kannada	Varalakshmi Stores ವರಲಕ್ಷ್ಮಿ ಸ್ಟೋರೀಸ್	17 June 2019	Star Suvarna	16 April 2020	Remake
Marathi	Sahkutumb Sahparivar सहकुटुंब सहपरिवार	24 February 2020	Star Pravah	3 August 2023	Remake
Bengali	Bhaggolokkhi ভাগ্যলক্ষী	31 August 2020	Star Jalsha	21 March 2021	Remake
Malayalam	Santhwanam സാന്ത്വനം	21 September 2020	Asianet	27 January 2024	Remake
Hindi	Gupta Brothers गुप्ता ब्रदर्स	5 October 2020	Star Bharat	26 January 2021	Remake
Hindi	Pandya Store पंड्या स्टोर	25 January 2021	StarPlus	26 May 2024	Remake
Kannada	Ananda Nilaya ಆನಂದ ನಿಲಯ	10 August 2026	Star Suvarna	Ongoing	Remake
