= Bhaggolokkhi =

Indian Bengali Television Series

- Genre: Drama
- Created by: Shashi Mittal
- Screenplay by: Saswati de
- Story by: Prashant Rathi; Manali Karia
- Directed by: Pavel Ghosh
- Creative directors: Yashvardhan Shukla; Prashant Rathi; Nirupama Chaterjee; Diya lekha Majumdar Varpe; Manash Chakraborty
- Starring: Farhan Imorze; Rahul Mazumdar; Sharly Modak; Ashmita Chakraborty; Parabdhi Singha; Saurabhi Mullick; Moyna Mukherjee; Debdyut Ghosh
- Country of origin: India
- Original language: Bengali
- No. of episodes: 201

Production
- Producers: Shashi Mittal; Sumeet Hukamchand Mittal; Rajeev Poorval
- Camera setup: Multi-camera
- Running time: 22 minutes
- Production company: Shashi Sumeet Productions

Original release
- Network: Star Jalsha
- Release: 31 August 2020 – 21 March 2021

Related
- Pandian Stores

Bhaggolokkhi is an Indian Bengali language television series produced under the banner of Shashi Mittal and Sumeet Hukamchand Mittal of Shashi Sumeet Productions. It aired from 31 August 2020 to 21 March 2021 on Star Jalsha. It is a remake of Star Vijay's Tamil series Pandian Stores. The series starred Rahul Majumder and Sharly Modak.

== Plot ==
Bodhayon Sarkar is the head of the family who runs a garment shop named Lakshmi Stores. He has two younger brothers, Rupayan and Subhayan. These three brothers and their paralysed mother Lakshmi lead a happy life. However, the stores which is running in loss and in debt is summoned by the court to seal it. While Bodhayon's marriage gets fixed with Rohini, on his marriage day he realises that Rohini loves his wealth only and considering Bhagyasree as the right person seeing her as an honest and responsible person, Bodhayon marries Bhagyasree which shocks Lakshmi who dislikes Bhagyasree. Because of this, Rohini wishes to revenge Bodhayon's family while Bhagyasree helps Bodhayon to recover their business in debt and also taking care of the family, striving for her acceptance by her mother-in-law who dislikes her. She takes care of everyone in the family and always be for them. Later, Bodhayon's brothers Subhayan and Rupayan marry Riya and Rusha.

Bhagyasree wishes to pursue an MBA on Bodhayon's insistence, but Lakshmi initially disapproves. The drama follows how Bhagyasree saves and maintains the unity of the Sarkar family from various threats from the Basak and Gupta families. Rohini realises and apologises for her mistakes and helps Bhagya expose Himadri and arrest him. The series ends with Bhagyasree being enrolled in an MBA college by Lakshmi and the family uniting and living happily after.

== Cast ==
=== Main ===
- Sharly Modak as Bhagyasree Sarkar a.k.a. Bhagya, Bodhi's wife, Riya and Rohini's cousin.
- Rahul Mazumdar as Bodhayon Sarkar a.k.a. Bodhi

=== Recurring ===
- Farhan Imroze as Rupayon "Roop" Sarkar
- Prarabdhi Singha as Subhayan "Subho" Sarkar
- Moyna Mukherjee as Lakshmi Sarkar: Bodhi, Roop and Subho's mother
- Surabhi Mallick as Rusha Gupta: Roop's wife, Himadri's daughter
- Ashmita Chakraborty as Riya Basak: Subho's wife, Bhagya's youngest cousin, Rohini's youngest sister
- Arpita Mukherjee as Hoimonti Basak: Riya and Rohini's mother
- Avrajit Chakraborty as Biswanath Basak
- Debdoot Ghosh as Himadri Gupta: Rusha's father who is the main enemy of Sarkar family
- Swagata Sen as Rohini Basak: Hoimonti's daughter, Riya's elder sister, Bhagya's cousin
- Argha Mitra as Neel
- Yuvraaj Chowdhury as Avik/Deb

== Reception ==
In week 42 of 2020, the series has risen to fifth place with 4.557 million impressions for the most watched television series in Bengal.

== Adaptations ==
Language	Title	Original release	Network(s)	Last aired	Notes
Tamil	Pandian Stores பாண்டியன் ஸ்டோர்ஸ்	1 October 2018	Star Vijay	28 October 2023	Original
Telugu	Vadinamma వదినమ్మ	6 May 2019	Star Maa	21 March 2022	Remake
Kannada	Varalakshmi Stores ವರಲಕ್ಷ್ಮಿ ಸ್ಟೋರೀಸ್	17 June 2019	Star Suvarna	16 April 2020	Remake
Marathi	Sahkutumb Sahparivar सहकुटुंब सहपरिवार	24 February 2020	Star Pravah	3 August 2023	Remake
Bengali	Bhaggolokkhi ভাগ্যলক্ষী	31 August 2020	Star Jalsha	21 March 2021	Remake
Malayalam	Santhwanam സാന്ത്വനം	21 September 2020	Asianet	27 January 2024	Remake
Hindi	Gupta Brothers गुप्ता ब्रदर्स	5 October 2020	Star Bharat	26 January 2021	Remake
Hindi	Pandya Store पंड्या स्टोर	25 January 2021	StarPlus	26 May 2024	Remake
Kannada	Ananda Nilaya ಆನಂದ ನಿಲಯ	10 August 2026	Star Suvarna	Ongoing	Remake
