= Pandian Stores =

Indian Tamil language TV series

- Genre: Family drama
- Created by: Priya Thambi
- Screenplay by: Priya Thambi
- Directed by: Siva Sekar (1-550 episodes); David Charlie
- Starring: Stalin Muthu; Sujitha; Venkat Renganathan; Hema Rajkumar; Kumaran Thangarajan; V. J. Chitra; Saravana Vickram; VJ Deepika
- Theme music composer: Ilaiyavan
- Country of origin: India
- Original language: Tamil
- No. of seasons: 2
- No. of episodes: 1348

Production
- Producers: S. Jeyalakshmi; VENUS infotainment
- Cinematography: V. Venkatesh
- Editors: V. Shakthi; T.Vinoth Nathan
- Camera setup: Multi-camera
- Running time: 22 minutes
- Production company: Venus Infotainment

Original release
- Network: Star Vijay
- Release: 1 October 2018 – 28 October 2023

Pandian Stores is a 2018 Indian Tamil-language soap opera airing on Star Vijay. The series has two seasons. Season 2 Pandian Stores 2 was a spin-off of Season 1 but with different plot and characters.

The first season premiered on 1 October 2018 and ended on 28 October 2023. It stars Stalin Muthu, Sujitha, Venkat Renganathan, Hema Rajkumar, Kumaran Thangarajan, V. J. Chitra, Saravana Vickram and VJ Deepika.

== Series overview ==
Season	No.of episodes	Original broadcast	
Season	No.of episodes	First aired	Last aired
1	1348	1 October 2018	28 October 2023
2	800+	30 October 2023	present

== Plot ==
Pandian's four sons, Sathyamoorthy, Jeevanandham, Kathiravan and Jayakannan, run Pandian Stores, a famous grocery store in their hometown Kundrakudi. Dhanalakshmi, a well-educated, courageous girl, enters the life of Sathyamoorthy against her family's wishes and leads the Pandian stores family to get well settled. She raises her brothers-in-law as her sons.

Fifteen years later Jeeva, Kathir and Kannan are adults. Sathyamoorthy lives happily along with his brothers Jeeva, Kathir and Kannan and his caring wife Dhanalakshmi. They run a grocery store named Pandian stores which is famous in their locality. Dhanam is often criticized by her relatives for not having children repeatedly, although her brother-in-laws did not let it affect her.

Lakshmi, the brothers' mother has a brother named Murugan with whom she has not been on talking terms for years. Murugan's daughter Mullai desires to marry Jeeva. Murugan convinces Lakshmi to accept this marriage. However, Jeeva dislikes this idea of marriage as he is in love with collegemate Meena. Later he conveys this to his sister-in-law Dhanam. Dhanam feels offended when she tries to discuss this with Meena's father Janardhanan. Meena's father thrashes her, so Jeeva sacrifices his love and accepts Mullai's marriage proposal. On the day of wedding Meena flees from her house and creates a scene in the marriage hall. Later, Dhanam decides to have Mullai marry Kathir, Jeeva's younger brother. Jeeva marries Meena and Kathir marries Mullai. Mullai blames Dhanam for ruining her life by marrying her to Kathir. But later she gets on well with her (Dhanam) when her mother berates Dhanam. Meanwhile, Meena often picks fights with Jeeva as she wants a lavish lifestyle. On the other hand, Dhanam and Moorthy try their best to unite Kathir and Mullai, who are at loggerheads.

Due to a misunderstanding Janardanan (Meena's father) slaps Kannan. This enrages the family and Janardanan stops sending goods to Pandian Stores, causing a crisis for the Pandian family. Moorthy decides to resolve the crisis and leaves the town, handing the responsibility to Jeeva. Janardanan plans to make the family suffer more by sending some fake clients to Pandian stores to give a marriage order. Jeevan believes the fake clients and agrees for the order believing that Moorthy would definitely return with the goods. Moorthy returns and tells everyone that he could not get the goods, much to Jeeva's horror. He asks Kathir and Jeeva to manage the situation with the remaining goods. But Jeeva reveals all those happened during his absence. Moorthy scolds Jeeva for being immature while Kathir takes upon himself to make the ends meet. Finally he acquires the goods and Moorthy praises him which pleases Mullai and irks Meena. Later, Kathir and Mullai befriend each other and Meena adjusts in the house. Meena wishes to go for a honeymoon but ends up going with the whole family except Moorthy and his mother. During this time, Kathir and Mullai grow closer. At home, Parvathy and Murugan take care of Moorthy's mother and the business, respectively. But Parvathy forgets to give medicine for Lakshmi (Moorthy's mother). When she falls unconscious Moorthy and Murugan rush her to the hospital and is saved. Meanwhile, Kathir, Mullai, Meena, Jeeva, Dhanam and Kannan return. After their return, Mullai and Kathir develop feelings for each other but are unable to confess. One day while Kannan Dhanam Meena and Mullai are talking, Kannan asks Mullai about her love for Kathir. She tells them that how they quarrelled in the beginning and how she acted as if she cares for him to avoid petty arguments. Kathir hears this and feels hurt. Mullai expresses her love for Kathir to Dhanam Meena and Kannan. When Kathir returns home at night he picks up a fight with Mullai. Disheartened, Mullai leaves to her parents' house. Mullai misses Kathir while he feels that he is unfit for her. Meena gets pregnant. The family is overwhelmed especially Dhanam. She takes good care of Meena and does everything to please her. Mullai returns on her birthday but Kathir has gone to Mullai's house to surprise her. When he goes there, Parvathy taunts him. On the other hand, Mullai thinks that Kathir is still angry with her. Kathir waits for Mullai but leaves for home when it is late. Mullai is in their room waiting for Kathir. When Kathir returns home, he sees Mullai but thinks that he is dreaming about Mullai. When he realizes that Mullai has returned, he struggles to wish her happy birthday but somehow wishes her seconds before twelve. Moorthy and Dhanam advise them to set things right between them. It is revealed that Dhanam and Moorthydecided not to have children as Moorthy's brothers were too young. Learning this, Dhanam's family is enraged and Jaga breaks his ties with Moorthy. Mullai learns about the great sacrifice but Dhanam stops her from informing the others about this. But somehow she reveals the truth to Kathir when he discusses about Dhanam's mother blaming Moorthy for all those Dhanam has to face. Kathir meets Jaga and assures him that he will take Dhanam to a doctor. He along with Mullai plan to get an appointment for Dhanam.

On the other hand, Janardanan is enraged upon learning that Meena is pregnant and no one informed him. After much convincing, Janardanan agrees to meet Meena. His wife asks her to come to her house and stay for a few days. Moorthy and Dhanam ask Jeeva to accompany Meena but refuses to go. Somehow, they manage to convince Jeeva and he half-heartedly leaves with Meena.

Janardhan includes Jeeva in all of his business dealings. Later, Kathir and Mullai request that Dhanam come to the hospital. But she refuses. Mulla later becomes ill and isolates herself. Soon, Meena detects a threat to her unborn child. Janardhan afterwards lashes out at her family.

Meanwhile, Kathir is detained when a moneylender disparages Mulla. Mulla donates her jewels as payment for Murugan's debts. The family prepares for Meena's baby shower. Meena goes into labor shortly after the ceremony and has a daughter. Meena and her daughter are confined to her father's home. Later, Kathir and Mulla travel to Chennai, where she understands Kathir is not guilty.

Dhanam and her family go to the temple, when Kamakshi cries out, claiming that Moorthy is liable for Dhanam's infertility. Moorthy and Dhanam are confronted by Lakshmi. Dhanam later arranges a nuptial night for Kathir and Mulla. After learning of her parents' deaths, the family invites Aishwarya into their home. Janardhan organises a baby-naming ceremony for Meena's baby, who is later named Kayalveli.

Kayal causes Meena and Jeeva problems. Meena is concerned as Kayal sobs uncontrollably and blames Dhanam for failing to care for her. Meanwhile, Dhanam worries and chooses to have herself tested for pregnancy. She discovers she is pregnant and decides to keep it a secret. Janardhan causes mayhem and urges Meena to stay with him. Dhanam informs Moorthy of her pregnancy. On Mulla's birthday, Kathir surprises her by taking her to the temple.

Moorthy informs everyone about Dhanam's pregnancy. Meena returns home after discovering this. The family organizes an event to commemorate Dhanam's pregnancy. Dhanam is told not to perform any housework. Mulla accepts her responsibilities. Lakshmi and Dhanam reprimand Mulla for cooking recklessly. Later, Meena's aunt Rasathi pays her a visit, intending to separate her from the Pandian Stores family. Rasathi's unusual conduct irritates the family. Meena understands the truth and expels her.

== Cast ==
=== Main ===
- Stalin Muthu as Sathyamoorthy aka Moorthy: Lakshmi and Pandian's eldest son; Jeeva, Kathir and Kannan's brother; Dhanam's husband; Lakshmana Pandian and Lakshmi Pandian's father
- Sujitha as Dhanalakshmi aka Dhanam: Varadarajan and Kamakshi's daughter; Jaga's sister; Moorthy's wife; Lakshmana Pandian and Lakshmi Pandian's mother
- Venkat Renganathan as Jeevanandham aka Jeeva: Lakshmi and Pandian's second son; Moorthy, Kathir and Kannan's brother; Meena's husband; Kayal's father
- Hema Rajkumar as Meenakshi aka Meena: Jeeva's wife; Kayal's mother
  - Kavitha Gowda (2018) as Meena (promo only)
- Kumaran Thangarajan as Kathiravan aka Kathir: Mullai's husband; Pandian and Lakshmi's third son; Moorthy, Jeeva and Kannan's brother; Sakthi's father
- V. J. Chitra (2018–2020) / Kaavya Arivumani (Dec. 2020–2022) / VJ Laavanya (Oct. 2022-2023) as Mullai Kathiravan: Kathir's wife; Sakthi's mother
- Saravana Vickram as Jayakannan aka Kannan: Lakshmi and Pandian's youngest son; Moorthy, Jeeva and Kathir's brother; Aishu's husband; Karthick's father
- Vaishali Thaniga (2020) / VJ Deepika Lakshmana Pandian (2021;2023) / Saai Gayatri Bhuvanesh (2021–2023) as Aishwarya aka Aishu: Kasthuri's sister's daughter; Kannan's wife; Karthick's mother

=== Supporting ===
- Sheela as Lakshmi: Muruganandham's sister; Pandian's widow; Moorthy, Jeeva, Kathir and Kannan's mother (2018–2021) (Dead)
- Shanthi Williams as "Pillaiyar Patti" Parvathy: Muruganandham's wife; Malli and Mullai's mother; Kasthuri's aunt
- S. T. P. Rosary as Muruganandham aka Murugan: Lakshmi's brother; Parvathy's husband; Malli and Mullai's father
- David Solomon Raja as Jaganathan aka Jaga: Varadarajan and Kamakshi's son; Dhanalakshmi's brother; Moorthy's best friend; Kasthuri's husband
- Meena Sellamuthu as Kasthuri: Jaga's wife; Akash's mother
- Sumangali as Kamakshi: Varadarajan's wife; Jaganathan and Dhanalakshmi's mother
- Venkat Subha (2018–2020) / Ravi Chandran (2021–2023) as Janardhanan: Meena's father; Kalaivani's husband
- Sri Vidhya Shankar as Kalaivani: Meena's mother; Janarthanan's wife
- Harsha Nair as Mallika aka Malli: Muruganandham and Parvathy's elder daughter; Mullai's sister; Bhaskar's widow; Prashant's stepmother; Moorthy's ex-fiancée
- Vasanth Vasi (2020–2022) / Mahesh Subramaniam (2023) as Prashanth: Bhaskar's son; Malli's step-son; Aishu's ex-fiancé; Shwetha's husband
- Vinuja Vijay (2018–2019) / Keerthi Vijay (2019–2022) / Bhavyashree (2023) as Shwetha: Prashanth's wife
- Yogeshwaran as Senthilnathan: Kathir's best friend; Padma's husband
- Myna Nandhini as Padma Senthilnathan: Senthilnathan's wife
- Kowsalya Senthamarai as Naagalakshmi: Kalaivani's mother
- Nellai Siva (2018–2020) / Theni Murugan (2022–2023) as Kumaresan: A friend and faithful employee of Pandian Stores
- Sathya Sai Krishnan as Meherunissa: Kannan's ex-love interest is also his neighbour. She is Muslim. (2020–2021)
- Gokul Krishnan as Saravanan: A worker in Pandian Stores and Kathir's friend
- Deepa as Selvi: Moorthy, Jeeva, Kathir and Kannan's cousin sister (2018–2020)
- Madhan as Maheshwaran: Kathir and Senthil's best friend; Rathi's husband (2020)
- Akshaya as Rathi Maheshwaran: Mahesh's wife (2020)
- Baby Hema as Harshita: Selvi's daughter (2019–2020)
- Master Nikhil as Aakash: Jaganathan and Kasthuri's son (2018)
- Jayanthi Narayanan as Kasthuri's mother
- Baby George as Vasuki: Kasthuri's elder sister; Aishwarya's mother (Dead) (2019)
- Jeya Lakshmi as Begum: Meher's mother (2020)
- Prakash Rajan as Sethupathi
- Rajashekar as Pandian
- Sulakshana as Raasathi: Janartanan's sister
- R. Aravindraj as Varadarajan
- Krishna Kumar as Baskar: Malli's husband; Prashanth's father (2018; 2021)

== Reception ==
Critics

The Indian Express quoted the series as "A simple serial with no violence, hostility, envy!".

Ratings

The highest TRP in week 36 the special episode of the character Meena's baby shower aired on 11 September 2020, garnered 11.462 million impressions becoming the most watched Tamil GEC program of the week and the first Star Vijay program to enter the top five. The special three-hour episode of the naming ceremony of Meena's baby aired on 23 November 2020 in week 49 garnered 10.987 million impressions occupying third position.

Week and year	BARC viewership (Tamil GEC)		
Week and year	Impressions (in millions)	Ranking	Ref.
Week 36, 2020	11.462	1	
Week 49, 2020	10.987	3	
Week 51, 2020	10.097	2	
Week 30, 2021	10.761	3	
Week 32, 2021	12.212	1	
Week 37, 2021	13.987	1	

== Production ==
Casting

- Kavitha Gowda was signed to play the role Meenakshi (Meena), but left the serial after making only a promo appearance. She was then replaced by Hema Rajkumar.
- Venkat Subha had played the role of Janardhanan, but after his death, he was replaced by Ravichandran.
- V. J. Chitra initially played the role of Mullai. She was replaced by Kaavya Arivumani, due to her sudden death. After that, in October 2022, Kavya announced her exit in the serial. Lavanya replaced Kavya.
- Nellai Siva, a well known supporting actor, played the role Kumaresan, His character was written out of the serial after his death due to COVID-19.
- Vaishali Taniga initially played the role of Aishwarya but she left in December 2020 and was replaced by VJ Deepika Lakshmanapandian until September 2021. After that the role was temporarily given to Sai Gayathri, but VJ Deepika returned in March 2023 as Aishwarya.

Filming

Due to the COVID-19 outbreak in India, Pandian Stores, and all other Indian television series and films production were suspended from 27 March 2020. The show commenced telecasting new episodes from 27 July 2020.

== Crossovers and special episodes ==
- On 11 September 2020, Pandian Stores held a three-hour non-stop special episode titled Pandian Stores: Kudumba Valaikappu Vizha for Meena's baby shower.
- On 23 November 2020, Pandian Stores Kulandaiyin Peyar Suttum Vizha held a three-hour non-stop special episode for Meena's Baby's name function.
- On 29 and 30 April 2021, Pandian Stores held two-and-a-half-hour non-stop special episodes titled Pandian Stores: Sathyamoorthy Dhanam Thirumana Vaibogam for Moorthy and Dhanam Marriage.
- From 22 to 27 July 2021, Pandian Stores celebrated Dhanalakshmi's baby shower.
- On 2019, Pandian Stores had a week of crossover episodes with Bharathi Kannamma (episodes 327–331).
- On 2021, Pandian Stores had crossover episodes with Baakiyalakshmi from 5 February to 28 February.
- It had a crossover with Thamizhum Saraswathiyum from 15 November 2021, to 28 November 2021.

== Awards and honours ==
Year	Award	Category	Recipient(s)	Result
2019	5th Annual Vijay Television Awards	Best Family Show	Pandian Stores	Won
2019	5th Annual Vijay Television Awards	Best Heroine	V. J. Chithra	Nominated
2019	5th Annual Vijay Television Awards	Best Supporting Actor	Sujitha	Won
2019	5th Annual Vijay Television Awards	Best Writer	Priya Thampi	Won
2021	6th Annual Vijay Television Awards	Favourite Family	Pandian Stores	Won
2021	6th Annual Vijay Television Awards	Best Anni	Sujitha	Won
2021	6th Annual Vijay Television Awards	Best Supporting Actor	Venkat Renganathan	Won
2021	6th Annual Vijay Television Awards	Best Supporting Actress	Hema Rajkumar	Won
2021	6th Annual Vijay Television Awards	Best Heroine	V. J. Chithra	Nominated
2021	6th Annual Vijay Television Awards	Best Heroine	Hema Rajkumar	Nominated
2021	6th Annual Vijay Television Awards	Best Writer	Priya Thampi	Won
2021	6th Annual Vijay Television Awards	Makalin Naayagi (Special Tribute Award)	V. J. Chithra	Won
2021	Behindwoods Gold Icons	Most Celebrated Actress on Television	V. J. Chithra	Won
2021	Behindwoods Gold Icons	Most Popular Actor on Television	Kumaran Thangarajan	Won
2022	7th Annual Vijay Television Awards	Favourite Family	Pandian Stores	Won
2022	7th Annual Vijay Television Awards	Best Hero	Kumaran Thangarajan	Won
2023	8th Annual Vijay Television Awards	Favourite Family	Pandian Stores	Won
2023	8th Annual Vijay Television Awards	Best Hero	Venkat Renganathan	Won
2023	8th Annual Vijay Television Awards	Best Supporting Actor Male	Saravanan Vikram	Won
2023	8th Annual Vijay Television Awards	1000 Episodes Special Award	Pandian Stores	Won

== Adaptations ==
Language	Title	Original release	Network(s)	Last aired	Notes	Ref.
Telugu	Vadinamma వదినమ్మ	6 May 2019	Star Maa	21 March 2022	Remake	
Kannada	Varalakshmi Stores ವರಲಕ್ಷ್ಮಿ ಸ್ಟೋರೀಸ್	17 June 2019	Star Suvarna	16 April 2020	Remake	
Marathi	Sahkutumb Sahparivar सहकुटुंब सहपरिवार	24 February 2020	Star Pravah	3 August 2023	Remake	
Bengali	Bhaggolokkhi ভাগ্যলক্ষী	31 August 2020	Star Jalsha	21 March 2021	Remake	
Malayalam	Santhwanam സാന്ത്വനം	21 September 2020	Asianet	27 January 2024	Remake	
Hindi	Gupta Brothers गुप्ता ब्रदर्स	5 October 2020	Star Bharat	26 January 2021	Remake	
Hindi	Pandya Store पंड्या स्टोर	25 January 2021	StarPlus	26 May 2024	Remake	
Kannada	Ananda Nilaya ಆನಂದ ನಿಲಯ	10 August 2026	Star Suvarna	Ongoing	Remake	
