= Kabani (TV series) =

2019 Indian Malayalam TV series

- Genre: Soap opera
- Written by: Dinesh Pallath
- Directed by: Sudheesh Sankar / Shiju Aroor
- Starring: Gopika Anil; Prem Jacob
- Theme music composer: M. Jayachandran
- Opening theme: Kilimakal Paadi
- Country of origin: India
- Original language: Malayalam
- No. of episodes: 303

Production
- Producer: Harsh Kawa
- Cinematography: Shijinjith / Vipin Paruvakkal
- Camera setup: Multi-camera
- Running time: 22 minutes
- Production company: Spinwheel Production

Original release
- Network: Zee Keralam
- Release: 11 March 2019 – 27 March 2020

Related
- Mutyala Muggu

Kabani is an Indian Malayalam television series directed by Sudheesh Sankar. The show premiered from 11 March 2019 which aired on Zee Keralam. It stars Gopika Anil, Prem Jacob and Keerthana Anil in lead roles along with Mallika Sukumaran and Krishna.

== Plot ==
Kabani's passion is to pursue higher education, but due to her family situation, she is unable to continue her studies. Still, luckily she takes part in a kabaddi competition and grabs the opportunity of a scholarship in a renowned college in the city. Initially, she faces hardships in the college as she comes from the village, it becomes difficult for her to adapt to modern culture.

The story heats up when she meets her half-sister Rambha, who despises her. She also happens to meet Rishi, and they both start to have feelings for each other. Rambha is envious to see them together as she has a crush on Rishi. Rambha plots numerous plans to create a rift in their relationship. The remaining episodes showcase how they succeed in love even after tackling countless conspiracies created by Rambha.

== Cast ==
=== Main ===
- Gopika Anil as Kabani
- Prem Jacob as Rishi
- Keerthana Anil as Padmini

=== Recurring ===
- Krishna as Surya
- Anshitha Akbarsha as Rambha
- Rajkumar Sathyanarayan as Rahul
- Mallika Sukumaran as Kottaramuttam Parvathyamma
- Swapna Treasa as Radhika/ Gouri
- Anjitha as Menaka
- Niveditha S Menon as Devaranjini
- Ranjith Raj as Varun
- Alice Christy as Nithya
- Dhanya Chandralekha as Sanjana
- Anoop MB Nair / Anu Gopi as Manikandan
- Murali as Shekhar
- Yamuna Mahesh as Urvashi
- T. P. Madhavan as Kabani's grandfather
- Angeline Mariya

== Adaptations ==
Language	Title	Original release	Network	Last aired	Notes
Telugu	Mutyala Muggu ముత్యాల ముగ్గు	7 March 2016	Zee Telugu	22 August 2019	Original
Tamil	Azhagiya Tamil Magal அழகிய தமிழ் மகள்	28 August 2017	Zee Tamil	14 June 2019	Remake
Kannada	Kamali ಕಮಲಿ	28 May 2018	Zee Kannada	7 October 2022	Remake
Malayalam	Kabani കബനി	11 March 2019	Zee Keralam	27 March 2020	Remake
Hindi	Saru सरू	12 May 2025	Zee TV	28 June 2026	Remake
