= Gopika Anil =

Indian actress

- Born: Kozhikode, Kerala, India
- Occupations: Actor; Ayurvedic practitioner
- Years active: 2002–present
- Known for: Kabani; Santhwanam
- Spouse: Govind Padmasoorya (m. 2024)

Gopika Anil is an Indian actress who appears in Malayalam films and television. She is best known for her role as Kabani in Zee Keralam's drama series Kabani and Anjali in Asianet's popular drama serial Santhwanam.

== Early life ==
Gopika was born on 26 April in Kozhikode, Kerala. After completing her education at Chinmaya Vidyalaya and at St. Joseph's School in Kozhikode, she completed her Bachelor's degree in Ayurvedic Medicine and Surgery (BAMS) from SDM College in Karnataka. Her younger sister, Keerthana, is also a television actress.

== Personal life ==
Gopika got engaged to the actor and television presenter Govind Padmasoorya on 22 October 2023. They got married on 28 January 2024.

== Career ==
Gopika started her career as a child artist in Shivam and Balettan in 2004 with her sister Keerthana.

== Filmography ==
=== Films ===
Year	Film	Role	Notes	Ref.
2002	Shivam	Bhadran's daughter	Movie debut	
2003	Balettan	Balan's elder daughter		
2004	Mayilattam	Young Mythili		
2004	Akale	Henna Fredy		
2012	Bhoomiyude Avakashikal	Rosy		
2014	Vasanthathinte Kanal Vazhikalil	Mathangi		
2018	Mattancherry	Sameera		
2025	Sumathi Valavu	Meenakshi		

=== Television ===
Year	Film	Role	Channel	Notes	Ref.
2002	Mangalyam	Child Artist	Asianet		
2005	Chitta	Child Artist	Surya TV		
2006	Unniyarcha	Kunji	Asianet		
2008–2009	Ammathottil	Young Seemanthini	Asianet		
2019–2020	Kabani	Kabani	Zee Keralam		
2020–2024	Santhwanam	Anjali Shivaramakrishnan (Anju)	Asianet		
2021–2023	Start Music Aaradhyam Paadum	Contestant	Asianet		

=== Other Works ===
Year	Film	Role	Notes	Ref.
2022	Girls	Stephy	Web series	
2023	Thudakkam Mangalyam	Revathi	Web series	
2024	Pennine Ishtayo	Veena	Short film	
