= Raksha Raj =

Indian actress

- Born: Della Raj
- Occupation: Actress
- Years active: 2008–present
- Notable work: Santhwanam Janakiyudeyum Abhiyudeyum Veedu
- Spouse: Arkaj (m. 2022)

Raksha Raj is an Indian Actress who works in Malayalam Television series and Tamil films. She is known for playing the role of Aparna in Asianet 's TV series Santhwanam.

== Filmography ==
=== Films ===
Year	Film	Role	Language	Ref.
2008	Lollipop	Rosebella's friend	Malayalam	
2009	Malayali	Daya	Malayalam	
2011	Avan Appadithan	Devi	Tamil	
2014	Sandiyar	Kayalvizhi	Tamil	
2015	Kamara Kattu	Malarkodi	Tamil	
2015	Thoppi	Nagu	Tamil	
2016	Pandiyoda Galatta Thaangala	Yamini	Tamil	
2017	Yen Inthamayakam	Anusha	Tamil	
2021	Uthra	Uthra	Tamil	
2024	Makudi	Devika	Malayalam	
2025	Khajuraho Dreams	Meetubhai wife	Malayalam	

=== Television ===
Year	Show	Role	Channel	Notes	Ref.
TV series
2020	Namukku Paarkkuvan Munthirithoppukal	Sofia	Surya TV	TV debut	
2020–2024	Santhwanam	Aparna	Asianet	Breakthrough role	
2024	Premam	Neelima	Pocket FM	Web series	
2024–2025	Janakiyudeyum Abhiyudeyum Veedu	Janaki	Asianet		
2026	Dheera 2	Sreelakshmi	DD Malayalam		
TV shows
2020	Onamamangam	Guest	Surya TV		
2021	Vishu Dhamaka	Guest	Asianet		
2021	Start Music Season 3	Contestant	Asianet		
2022	Start Music Season 4	Contestant	Asianet		
2024	Bigg Boss (Malayalam TV series) season 6	Guest	Asianet		
2025	Enkile Ennodu Para	Contestant	Asianet		
2025	Maveli Kottaram	Janaki	Asianet	Telefilm	
