= Fireflies: Parth Aur Jugnu =

Indian web series

- Created by: Alok Sharma, Animesh Verma, Amrit Walia
- Written by: Alok Sharma, Nupur Sharma
- Directed by: Hemant Gaba
- Starring: Meet Mukhi; Aekam Binjwe; Zoya Afroz; Priyanshu Chatterjee; Luke Kenny; Madhoo; Rahul Singh; Riva Arora; Harshit Bhojwani; Aekam Binjwe; Varun Kapoor
- Country of origin: India
- Original language: Hindi
- No. of episodes: 10

Production
- Producer: Amrit Walia
- Production companies: Cinnamon Media & Artworks

Original release
- Network: ZEE5
- Release: 5 May 2023

Fireflies: Parth Aur Jugnu is an Indian Hindi-language fantasy drama series starring Meet Mukhi, Aekam Binjwe, Madhoo, Priyanshu Chatterjee and Luke Kenny in primary roles. The show features actors Zoya Afroz and Varun Kapoor in recurring parts. The show has been written by Alok Sharma, and directed by Hemant Gaba. The series premiered on ZEE5 on 5 May 2023.

== Plot ==
The story is about two star-crossed kids embarking on a magical journey to save the world. Down-and-out fourteen year old Parth meets Jugnu, a mystical kid from the haunted forest of Bheem Mukteshwar and together they embark on a journey full of action-packed adventure, self-discovery, and bedtime stories.

== Cast and characters ==
- Meet Mukhi as Parth Negi
- Aekam Binjwe as Jugnu
- Madhoo as Ira Ranaut – Parth's grandmother
- Priyanshu Chatterjee as Dr. Arjun Negi
- Luke Kenny as Sleeman/Mritunjay Vyas
- Zoya Afroz as Nyasa
- Varun Kapoor as Laffu
- Akshat Singh as Johnson George
- Harshit Bhojwani as Dangwal
- Riva Arora as Shilpi
- Rahul Singh as Hooda Sir
- Hitesh Dave as Edison George

== Production ==
The idea of the series originated from the writer Alok Sharma's having failed class IX himself. He understood the agony and pain of being termed a failure and combined that with fiction set in the backdrop of North Indian mountains. Popular mythologist and author Devdutt Pattanaik was roped in as a script consultant on this show. Apart from him, Alok also brought the noted American comic book writer Ron Marz, better known as the co-creator of DC Comics's character Kyle Rayner, also a consultant on board as a script editor for this show. The shoots of the show started in August 2022. The first piece of news around the casting of the show appeared in June 2022, when IWM Buzz reported that popular child actor Aekim Binjwe was signed to play one of the leads in the show.

== Marketing ==
The teaser promo of Fireflies: Parth Aur Jugnu was released on 17 March 2023. The trailer was subsequently released on 26 April 2023.

== Trivia ==
- The character Edison George is named after a famous Indian Comic book artist Edison George, a.k.a. Manu
- Rotogravure Printers mentioned in the series were used to print Indrajal Comics in India in the 1970s
- The superheroes mentioned in Episode 3 are homages to popular Indian Superheroes – Nagrani is based on Nagraj, Wolfa is based on Bhediya and Doga and Super Cop Manu is based on Super Commando Dhruva
- The comic books that the child actors read on the show are a homage to the comic books printed in India in the 1990s

== Reception ==
The show got mixed reviews from critics.

Outlook rated it 3.5 out of 5 and commented, "Fireflies: Parth Aur Jugnu' brings a perfect amalgamation of fantasy, magic and mythology for the entire family."

The Times Of India rated it 2 out of 5 stating, "with some more depth in execution and a convincing visual experience, this is the kind of an idea that has the potential to fascinate children of all ages."
