= Luke Kenny =

Indian actor, film director, producer, and music director

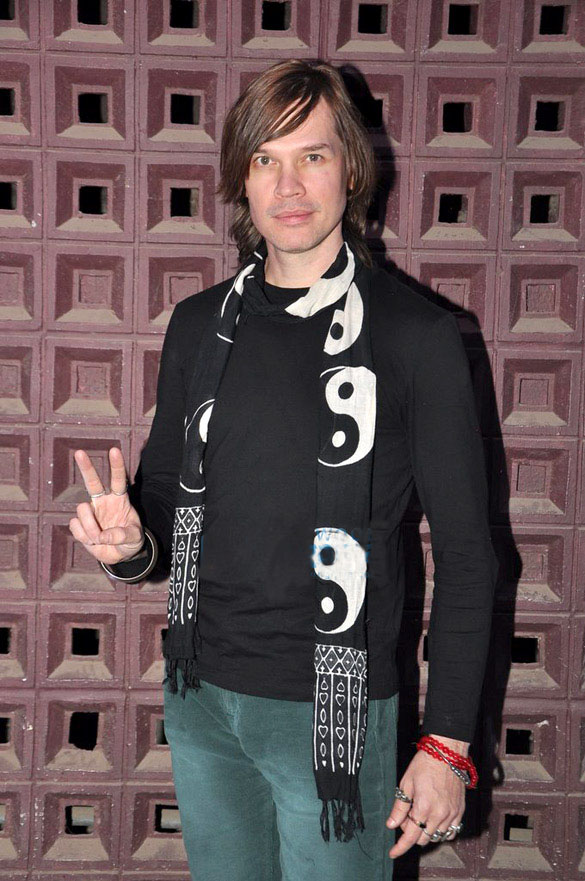
- Kenny in 2012
- Born: Kolkata, West Bengal, India
- Years active: 1989–present
- Known for: Rock On!!

Luke Kenny is an Indian actor, film director, producer, music director, composer, and former VJ. He began his career as a DJ, followed by a successful stint as the first male VJ on Channel V. He gained widespread recognition for his role in the 2008 rock musical drama Rock On!!

In 2018, Kenny came back into prominence for his role as the hired mercenary Malcolm Murad in the Netflix series Sacred Games.

== Early life ==
Kenny was born in Kolkata and is of Anglo-Indian descent. His Irish grandfather was originally from Burma but moved to India after WWII and married Kenny's British grandmother. The actor's father, Robert Kenny, was born in Delhi and was a musician. He later moved to Kolkata and married Kenny's mother, who was Italian. Kenny's parents divorced when he was very young and he grew up in Mumbai with his father and grandfather, both musicians, prompting his interest in music from a young age. He was a student at Elphinstone College in Mumbai but left the school early to pursue a career in music.

== Career ==
Kenny began his career as a dancer, influenced by Michael Jackson. He was spotted and later recruited by Arshad Warsi's dance crew. In 1991, he joined the rock band Greek as a vocalist. Between 1993 and 1995, he had a small stint as a DJ. In 1995, he joined the newly launched Channel V as their first male VJ. He became popular and had a long-term association with the channel. Kenny got his first acting break in the 1997 film Bombay Boys alongside Naveen Andrews, albeit in a small role. After this, he went back to Channel V and served as their head of music programming until 2008. In 2005, Kenny tried his hand at directing and producing, with the film 13th Floor, starring Purab Kohli and Sandhya Mridul. The production was India's first digitally-released film and received recognition at film festivals. Kenny returned to acting with his breakthrough role in the 2008 film Rock On!!

Kenny has also been a contributor to various news columns. He used to write "If I May Say So" for the Hindustan Times and "LukeBox" for Rolling Stone India. In 2011 he became the channel head of 9XO, a 24/7 international music channel owned by 9X Media. In 2013, he produced and starred in India's first zombie film, Rise of the Zombie.

Kenny recently regained public attention with his acclaimed portrayal of Malcolm Murad, a hired mercenary, in the first Netflix India original series, Sacred Games. Kenny was part of the cast in both seasons of the show. He next appeared as GDPA official Wolfgang Hummels (inspired by WADA) in the second season of the Amazon Prime show Inside Edge. The same year, he also appeared in the film Tanhaji, portraying the Mughal emperor Aurangzeb.

In 2022, Kenny appeared in the Disney+ Hotstar series Rudra: The Edge of Darkness. The same year, he was added to the upcoming web series Parth aur Jugnu.

== Filmography ==
=== Film ===
List of film appearances, with year, title, and role shown
Year	Title	Role	Notes
1998	Bombay Boys	Xavier	
2008	Rock On!!	Rob Nancy	
2013	Rise of the Zombie	Neil Parker	
2016	Banjo	Mickey a.k.a. Mic	
2016	Rock On 2	Rob Nancy	Cameo in the song "You Know What I Mean"
2017	Qarib Qarib Singlle	Sidkong	
2020	Tanhaji	Aurangzeb	
2023	The Archies	Ricky Mantle	
2024	Merry Christmas	Jerome	
2025	Kesari Chapter 2	Appeal court judge	

=== Television ===
List of television appearances, with year, title, and role shown
Year	Title	Role	Notes
2018	21 Sarfarosh – Saragarhi 1897	Major Des Voeux	Discovery Jeet
2018	Sacred Games	Malcolm Mourad	Netflix
2019	Inside Edge	Wolfgang Hummels	Amazon Prime Video
2022	Rudra: The Edge of Darkness	JK Lamba	Disney+ Hotstar
2022	Dharavi Bank	Michael	Disney+ Hotstar
2023	Fireflies: Parth Aur Jugnu	Sleeman/Mritunjay Vyas	ZEE5
2025	The Royals	Adi Mehta / Maurice	Netflix

=== Other crew positions ===
Year	Title	Director	Producer
2005	13th Floor	Yes	Yes
2013	Rise of the Zombie		Yes
