= Rahul Mazumdar =

Indian model and actor

- Born: Rahul Mazumdar; 5 May 1990 (age 36); Kolkata, West Bengal, India
- Occupations: Actor, model
- Years active: 2017–present
- Known for: Debi Choudhurani; Bhaggolokkhi; Khukumoni Home Delivery; Horogouri Pice Hotel

Rahul Mazumdar (born 5 May 1990) is an Indian actor who predominantly works in Bengali films and TV series. Rahul made his debut with the Bengali movie Wrong Route, in which he played the lead role. He is originally from Kolkata.

== Career ==
Rahul Mazumdar started his career with the Bengali television series Debi Choudhurani. Apart from Debi Choudhurani, he has worked in many television serials such as Bhaggolokkhi, Khukumoni Home Delivery, and Horogouri Pice Hotel.

== Television ==
Year	Serial	Role	Channel	Notes	References	Co–Star
2018–2019	Debi Chowdhurani	Brojeshwar "Brojo" Rai	Star Jalsha	Lead Role		Sonamoni Saha
2020–2021	Bhaggolokkhi	Bodhayon "Bodhi" Sarkar	Star Jalsha	Lead Role		Sharly Modak
2021–2022	Khukumoni Home Delivery	Bihan Deb	Star Jalsha	Lead Role		Dipanwita Rakshit
2022–2024	Horogouri Pice Hotel	Shankar Ghosh	Star Jalsha	Lead Role		Suvosmita Mukherjee
2025	Anurager Chhowa	S.P. Aditya Choudhury	Star Jalsha	Lead Role		Swastika Ghosh; Tiyasha Lepcha
2026–Present	Saat Paake Bandha	Shubho	Zee Bangla	Lead Role		Sampurna Rakshit

== Films ==
Year	Film	Role	Ref.
2018	Wrong Route	Bonny	
Upcoming	Take Care Bhalobasa	Ishan	
