= Rise of the Zombie =

- Theatrical release poster
- Directed by: Devaki Singh; Luke Kenny
- Produced by: BSI Entertainment; Kenny Media
- Starring: Luke Kenny; Kirti Kulhari; Ashwin Mushran; Benjamin Gilani
- Cinematography: Murzy Pagdiwala
- Edited by: Sanjeev Rathore; Parthasarthy Iyer
- Distributed by: Reliance Entertainment
- Release date: 5 April 2013
- Running time: 90 Mins approx
- Country: India
- Language: Hindi

Rise of the Zombie is a 2013 Indian horror film directed by Luke Kenny and Devaki Singh. It stars Luke Kenny, Kirti Kulhari, and Ashwin Mushran.

== Synopsis ==
Neil Parker is a passionate wildlife photographer who pays more attention to his wildlife than his human life. As a result, his relationships with the real world suffer. When his girlfriend walks out on him he resigns himself to isolation and nature. But a chance occurrence changes all that. Changes that he can't seem to handle, changes that seem to take his humanity away... changes that seem unable to change back? The story follows his journey into a darkness that has to be seen to be believed. A monster that seems to be rising out of the depths of desolation and agony... soulless, depraved and out of control.

== Cast ==
- Luke Kenny as Neil Parker
- Kirti Kulhari as Vinny Rao
- Ashwin Mushran as Anish Kohli
- Benjamin Gilani as Mr. Dave Parker

== Critical reception ==
Rise of the Zombie had a limited release. Swati Deogire of in.com praised Luke Kenny's performance. Rohit Vats of IBNLive gave the film two out of five, saying that it "could have become a better film if the makers would have devised a way of showing a connection between the gloomy environment of the mountains and the mystical origin of the zombie."
