= Anurager Chhowa =

2022 Indian Bengali language TV series

- Genre: Drama; Romance
- Developed by: Pradeep Panicker; Leena Gangopadhyay
- Written by: Srabasti Basu; Sayan Chowdhury
- Screenplay by: Srabasti Basu
- Story by: Srabasti Basu
- Directed by: Anupam Hari
- Creative director: Aditi Roy
- Starring: Swastika Ghosh; Dibyojyoti Dutta; Rahul Mazumdar; Tiyasha Lepcha; Dhrubajyoti Sarkar
- Theme music composer: Joy Sarkar
- Opening theme: by Anweshaa
- Country of origin: India
- Original language: Bengali
- No. of seasons: 2
- No. of episodes: 1245

Production
- Executive producers: Nibedita; (SVF); Tania; Sweta; Anwesha; (Star Jalsha)
- Producers: Shrikant Mohta; Mahendra Soni
- Production location: Kolkata
- Cinematography: Dipankar Saha
- Editor: Babulal Sau
- Camera setup: Multi-camera
- Running time: 23 minutes
- Production company: Shree Venkatesh Films

Original release
- Network: Star Jalsha
- Release: 7 February 2022 – 30 November 2025

Related
- Karuthamuthu; Kusum Dola

Anurager Chhowa is an Indian Bengali language television series that premiered on 7 February 2022 on Star Jalsha and streams digitally on JioHotstar. One of the longest running Bengali television soap opera, the show is produced under the banner of Shree Venkatesh Films. It formerly starred Swastika Ghosh and Dibyojyoti Dutta. Since September 2025, it starred Ghosh with Rahul Mazumdar in lead roles.

== Plot ==
The show highlights the importance of good characteristics in life over external beauty. It mainly revolves around a love triangle story between two women and one man.

The story revolves around Deepa a humble woman and Surjo a kind cardiologist. Deepa is mistreated by her stepmother and half sister Urmi after her mother's death since childhood and her father does not defend her. Later she crosses path with Surjo Sengupta and they immediately like each other. Deepa is forced to marry the son of MLA in order by her stepmother and step grandmother in order to sell her late mother's land. She is saved by Surjo and to defend his love he married her. This marriage is faced with opposition from his mother Lavanya Sengupta and Urmi Sengupta who wanted to marry Surjo but ended up marrying his brother Joy. Later, Surjo's best friend and obsessive lover Mishka Sen returns. She has secretly killed his girlfriend Hiya by causing their accident over two years ago. Later, Deepa starts to suspect Mishka's intentions and discovers her obsession with Surjo and tries to expose her but no one believes.

Eventually Lavanya accepts Deepa and Urmi falls in love with Joy. To prevent Deepa and Surjo from uniting Mishka makes Deepa's pregnancy appear to be illegitimate because Surjo is unfit to be a father since he is infertile and Deepa is having an affair with Kabir one of Mishka's regular patients. Deepa is revealed to be pregnant and when she tells this to family, Surjo doubts her under the illusion that Mishka had created. Surjo doubts Deepa's dignity and feeling insulted she leaves the Sengputa House with Lavanya's support. She faces many trials trying to meet ends meet to support her pregnancy.

Deepa undergoes labor pain and reaches Surjo's hospital to deliver her child. Mishka learns of this and attempts to kill her when she injects her with a lethal injection. She survives and gives birth to twin girls named Rupa and Shona. Shona is taken away by Lavanya and Prabir since she feels Deepa cannot support both her kids without Surjo's financial help. Shona is made to appear as an orphan so that Surjo can adopt her. Mishka hovers around Surjo and manipulates him to marry her. Their wedding is stopped by Deepa but she is coldly insulted by Surjo and she decides to leave him for good. Surjao still in love with Deepa refuses to marry Mishka foiling Mishka's schemes. Deepa and Surjo decide to raise their daughters Rupa and Shona respectively.

Deepa lives in a village with Rupa and Surjo with Shona in the city along with Sengupta family and has raised her with love even though he adopted her not knowing that he is her biological father.

Rupa is courageous and outspoken and always supports and defends Deepa while Shona is sweet and gentle as Deepa. Mishka still hovers around Surjo using the excuse of friendship and pretends to care for Shona so as to get Surjo's approval for her marriage as she still stuck in her obsession, but her efforts bear no fruit as Shona dislikes, since she sees through her act.

Lavanya searches for Deepa and she wishes to unite her and Rupa, with Deepa and Surjo to fulfill the complete family. Rupa meets Lavanya, Surjo and Shona, during their drive to the health camp held in the village where Deepa lives. Lavanya and Surjo immediately like her and he bond with her. Deepa sees the family at the village fair and tries to avoid them still hurting from the past. Mishka and Deepa cross paths and, during their confrontation Deepa vows to fight for her place in the Sengputa family. Threatened by this Mishka resorts to her old ways and decides to kill Deepa. Deepa moves to the city for Rupa's future and lands a job and at the school where Rupa and Shona study. Their Shona meets Deepa and they feel bonded towards each other. Surjo also meets Rupa and they also connect, with each other. Deepa continues to avoid Surjo as she does not want to bring up the past anymore and, in order to protect Rupa she, makes her act as her niece to keep her away from Surjo's anger and Mishka's plots. Mishka discovers that, Rupa is Deepa's daughter and decides to kill them both. Later, Deepa learns that, Shona's connection to Surjo, but misunderstands that, Surjo and Mishka are her parents, during a family gathering. Later, the whole Sengputa family sees Deepa and they are glad to see her once again, except for Urmi, who fears to lose her place to Deepa.

Rupa and Shona initially fight, with each other, due to jealousy of the other becoming closer to each other's parents. Later, they grow closer as they share a common goal to stop Mishka's acts. Shona longs for a mother and she sees that, in Deepa and opts that, Surjo can fulfil her desire. During a family event, Surjo learns that, Deepa has met Shona behind his back furious he harshly condemns her and warns her to stay away from his daughter. Despite Deepa's explanations, Surjo humiliates, insults and degrades her for being a gold digger using Shona for her own benefit multiple times, when she interacts with Shona. Mishka further manipulates Surjo wishing to protect Shona decides to leave, with her, but her health deteriorates this, in order to heal Surjo lets Deepa take care of her. Mishka fearing that, Deepa and Surjo might reunite, because of this decides to fasten her plans to kill Deepa, but she is saved multiple times, by Surjo, who still loves her. Later, Rupa discovers that, Surjo is her father and is deeply hurt that, he had abandoned her and her mother years ago, and wishes to confront him, but is stopped, by Deepa. This revelation changes Rupa's attitude towards Surjo, but not only her, but so does Shona as he shows anger and frustration for those, who support Deepa including his family. This causes rifts in their family as Surjo constantly fights, with everyone, who supports Deepa.

Mishka becomes desperate to harm Deepa as she fears to lose her, later, she starts to suspect Shona's origin, due to the constant support from Lavanya as she was her biological granddaughter so she investigates and confirms that, she is indeed Surjo and Deepa's daughter as well. She decides to prevent their reunion as a family and continues, with her schemes. This also happens, when Deepa discovers that, she had given birth to twins five years ago and confronts Kabir's wife, the alive nurse, who was their that, day, but she does not reveal anything about Lavanya's request. She starts suspecting Shona is her daughter and later confirms that, Lavanya took her way. She decides to take her away, but is begged, by Lavanya that, it may break Surjo as she is her only support after his separation from her. Urmi is revealed to be pregnant, with Joy's child and Deepa decides to support her sister through her pregnancy as she had no one to do it, during her time. Urmi starts to feel Deepa's care and change her attitude towards her becoming affectionate.

Ratna tells Shona about her adoption, which sparks tension in the Sengputa family. Shona feeling hurt decides to leave, with Deepa and for the sake of her happiness, Surjo agrees. Later, the girls, Surjo and Deepa live under the same house as a family. Urmi gives birth to baby boy, who is named Deep. Their peace is disrupted, by Mishka once again, and Shona and Surjo leave. Shona's birth is revealed to Surjo, and believing her and Rupa are Kabir's daughters is left, with anger and resentment for Deepa. Shona discovers this too and wants to leave, with Deepa so for her happiness Surjo permits and lets her go. Deepa's health deteriorates and fearing to die, and leave her kids all alone she requests Surjo to confirm his paternity to them through a test.

Mishka tries to cover the truth this time as well, but it comes to light. Finally Surjo confirms Rupa and Shona are his daughters after a DNA test. Surjo regrets all his past mistakes and rushed to Deepa, who is critically ill begging him not to leave her. Deepa recovers, but is still furious at Surjo for all the pain he had caused her with his doubts and accusations for all these years. Deepa decides to live in Sengputa house for her children's sake, despite her anger for Surjo. The whole family decides to help him win back Deepa's heart and as they start to live together, Deepa anger for Surjo goes away.

On the day, Surjo plans to propose to Deepa, Misha enters and clashes the party revealing that, she is pregnant, with Surjo's child, which causes chaos once again. In reality Mishka had stolen Surjo's sperm samples for, when he was testing his fertility and had used IVF to become pregnant, with his child, in order to separate him from Deepa. Knowing Mishka's antics and past deceptions. Deepa keeps her trust in Surjo and investigates Mishka's allegations and discovers her deceptions and gathers evidence. But Mishka uses her pregnancy to defame Surjo and Mishka's adoptive father threatens to ruin the Sengputa name with his resources and this is possible since the Sengputa business is financially struggling and in order to keep Mishka's baby within the family. The Sengputas decide to allow Mishka to stay within the house and care for her during terminal pregnancy since the child is still Surjo's.

== Cast ==
=== Main ===
- Swastika Ghosh as
  - Deepanita "Deepa" Majumdar Sengupta – Ajay and Shyama's daughter; (2022–2025)
    - Ruchira Dey as Child Deepa Majumdar (2022)
  - Shyama Majumdar – Ajay's first wife; (2022–2023)
  - Sudeepa Mitra Chowdhury – MBBS student; Rupa and Krishna's younger daughter; (2025)
    - Priyanshita Samanta as Child Sudeepa Mitra (2025)
- Dibyojyoti Dutta as Surjo Sengupta – A cardiologist; Lavanya and Prabir's elder son; Hiya's former love interest; (2022–2025)
- Ahona Dutta as
  - Dr. Mishka Sen – A former surgeon; Prajit's adopted daughter; Surjo's ex-best friend and one-sided obsessive love interest; Deepa's arch-nemesis; Hiya's murderer; (2022–2025)
  - Tishka Ray - Mishka's estranged twin sister (2024)
- Sanghati Banerjee as Rupa "Rai" Sengupta Roy – Deepa and Surjo's elder daughter; Aryan's former one-sided love interest; (2025)
  - Saina Chatterjee as Teenage Rupa "Joyee" Sengupta (2024–2025)
    - Srishti Majumdar as Child Rupa Sengupta (2022–2024)
- Kushal Thakur as Krishna Roy – Kuntala's step-son; (2025)
- Nisha Poddar as Shona Sengupta – Deepa and Surjo's younger daughter; (2025)
  - Debopriya Basu as Teenage Shona "Oli" Sengupta (2024–2025)
    - Misheeta Ray Chowdhury as Child Shona Sengupta (2022–2024)
- Unknown as Dr. Aryan – A doctor and singer; Rupa and Shona's former classmate; Shona's husband (2025)
  - Rishav Chakraborty as Teenage Aryan (2024)
- Rahul Mazumdar as S.P Aditya Chowdhury – Indira and Anshuman's son; Parama's former love interest; (2025)
- Tiyasha Lepcha as Surupa "Parama" Banerjee Chowdhury – Rupa and Krishna's elder daughter; Aditya's former love interest; (2025)
- Dhrubajyoti Sarkar as Major Abhrajit "Abhra" Chowdhury – Aghar and Gayatri's son; (2025)

=== Recurring ===
- Rupanjana Mitra as Lavanya Lahiri Sengupta – A businesswoman; Dr. Lahiri's daughter (2022–2024)
- Debdut Ghosh as Prabir Sengupta – Pratik's brother; (2022–2025)
- Ritu Pyne / Priyantika Karmakar as Ira Dutta – Surjo's ex-wife (2024) / (2024)
- Prarabdhi Singha as Joy Sengupta – Lavanya and Prabir's younger son; (2022–2025)
- Soumili Chakraborty as Urmi Majumdar Sengupta – Ratna and Ajay's daughter; (2022–2025)
- Aniket Ghosh as Deep Sengupta – Urmi and Joy's son; Jr. Lavanya's half-brother (2025)
  - Adrian Biswas as Child Deep Sengupta (2024–2025)
  - Gloria as Baby Deep Sengupta (2023–2024)
- Subhasree Chakraborty as Jr. Lavanya Sengupta – Joy and Shalini's daughter (2025)
- Prapti Chatterjee as Palak Sengupta – Lavanya and Prabir's daughter (2022–2025)
- Sheersha Banerjee / Sneha Debb as Tista Sengupta Chakrabarty – Pratik and Anuja's daughter (2022) / (2022–2024)
- Subhankar Dey as Victor Chakrabarty – Pritha's younger son (2023–2024)
- Sayantani Sengupta Mullick as Anuja Sengupta – Pratik's wife (2022–2025)
- Avrajit Chakraborty as Pratik Sengupta – Prabir's brother (2022–2025)
- Mallika Majumdar as Ratna Majumdar – Nistarini Devi's daughter (2022–2025)
- Bimal Chakraborty as Ajay Majumdar – Shyama's widower; Ratna's husband (2022–2024)
- Tanima Sen as Nistarini Devi – Ratna's mother (2022–2023)
- Naren Bhattacharya as Lalit -Tabla's elder brother; Aruna's husband; Deepa's brother-figure (2022-2025)
- Sumana Mukhopadhyay as Aruna- Lalit's wife (2022-2024)
- Suman Banerjee as Parijat Sen – Mishka's adoptive father; Veer's adoptive grandfather (2022–2024)
- Madhupriya Chowdhury as Hiya – Surjo's late ex-girlfriend; Mishka's best friend (2022)
- Shoumo Banerjee as Kabir Rizvi – A writer; Deepa's brother-figure; Shivani's husband (2022–2023)
- Gulshanara Khatun as Shivani – a nurse; Kabir's wife (2022-2023)
- Anindya Banerjee as Tarit "Tabla" – Lalit's younger brother; Mishka's former one-sided lover and enemy; Deepa's brother-figure (2022–2025)
- Shaktipada Dey as Kumar: Lavanya and Deepa's rival; Kuntala's father; Rudi's grandfather; Krishna's step-grandfather (2022–2025)
- Chaiti Ghoshal as Sister Margaret (2023)
- Arjun Chakrabarty as Dr. Arjun Chakraborty – Pritha's elder son; Victor's brother; Deepa's childhood friend and ex-fiancé;(2023–2024)
- Suchismita Chowdhury as Pritha Chakraborty – Arjun and Victor's mother (2023–2024)
- Biswajit Chakraborty as Khoka – Arjun's uncle (2023–2024)
- Madhurima Mukherjee as Ahona - Arjun's sister (2023-2024)
- Konkoni Bhattacharya as Pritha (2023–2024)
- Chitra Saha as Officer Arpita Roy (2024)
- Dulal Lahiri as Dr. Sanyal (2024)
- Kaushik Das (2024)
- Aritram Mukherjee (2024)
- Samata Das as Nurse (2024)
- Nabanita Malakar as Charu Sarkar – Surjo's friend; Shona's caretaker and mother-figure; Shakyadev's wife (2024–2025)
- Sagnik Chatterjee as Shakyadev Sarkar – Deepa's boss; Rupa's foster father; Charu's husband (2024–2025)
- Sudipa Basu as Mrs. Sarkar – Shakyadev's mother; Rupa's foster grandmother (2024–2025)
- Soumi Paul as Shalini – Joy's ex-lover; Jr. Lavanya's mother (2025)
- Soujit Kumar Das as Raktim "Rudi" Roy – Kuntala's son; Krishna's half-brother; Shona's ex-husband (2025)
- Arijita Mukhopadhyay as Kuntala Kumar Roy – Kumar's daughter; Rudi's mother; Krishna's step-mother; Parama and Sudeepa's step-grandmother (2025)
- Unknown as Mr. Roy – Kuntala's husband; Rudi and Krishna's father; Parama and Sudeepa's grandfather (2025)
- Sutirtha Saha as Avinash Sharma – An ex-police officer and Deepa's well wisher (2025)
- Rohit Mukherjee as Inspector Himadri Mitra – Aarti's brother; Renu's widower; Sudeepa's adoptive father (2025)
- Unknown as Renu Mitra – Himadri's wife; Sudeepa's adoptive mother (2025)
- Somjita Bhattacharya as Aarti Mitra – Himadri's sister; Sudeepa's adoptive aunt (2025)
- Chiradip Chowdhury as Atul Banerjee – Shruti's husband; Parama's adoptive father (2025)
- Mousumi Mou Chakraborty as Shruti Banerjee – Atul's wife; Parama's adoptive mother (2025)
- Animesh Bhaduri as Angshuman Chowdhury – Aghar's brother; Indira's husband; Aditya's father (2025)
- Tanushree Goswami as Indira Chowdhury – Angshuman's wife; Aditya's mother (2025)
- Poushmita Goswami as Gayatri Chowdhury – Matriarch of Chowdhury family; Aghar's widow; Abhra's mother (2025)
- Priyab Chowdhury as Abhinav "Abhi" Chowdhury (2025)
- Neha Ghosh as Arshi Chowdhury (2025)
- Amitava Das as Anirban "Ani" Chowdhury – Abhra, Aditya, Abhinav and Arshi's cousin; Sanchari's husband (2025)
- Sanchari Mondal as Sanchari Chowdhury – Anirban's wife (2025)
- Manish Chakraborty (2025)
- Kushal Papai Bhowmick as Sundar – Sudeepa's stalker and obsessive lover; Himadri's murderer (2025)
- Arkojyoti Paul Chowdhury as Dr. Ritam – Sudeepa's medical college professor and one sided obsessive lover (2025)
- Kathakali Chakraborty as Tina – Abhra's friend

== Production ==
=== Development ===
The series is an official adaptation of the Malayalam television series, Karuthamuthu. It loosely followed the series Anupamaa and Yeh Rishta Kya Kehlata Hai.

In December 2022, Anurager Chhowa introuced a leap of 5 years, following a series of continuous misunderstandings and malicious conspiracies orchestrated against them by the primary antagonist Mishika, the leads Deepa and Surjyo, part ways. After Deepa gives birth to twin daughters, Sona and Rupa, who grow up separated from each other.

On 25 March 2025, the series completed 1000 episodes successfully. At the same date, the show took its first generation leap of 20 years whereas Nisha Poddar and Sanghati Banerjee take over the roles of grown-up Sona and Rupa respectively.

In September 2025, the second generation leap of 20 years after the earthquake wiped off entire sengupta family, loosely follows Kusum Dola. The story fast forwarded with Rupa's twin daughter Sudeepa crossing paths with S.P. Aditya and long lost sister Parama, portrayed by Swastika Ghosh, Rahul Mazumdar and Tiyasha Lepcha respectively.

=== Special episode ===
On 1st October 2023, the show aired one-hour gala episode, Anurager Chhonwaye Bhalobashar Utsab arranged to celebrate the anniversary of the leads, Deepa and Surjo.

=== Broadcast ===
The series was dubbed in English and airs on Star Life as "You Have My Heart". It was dubbed in Hindi and aired on Star Plus as "Chhoo Kar Mere Mann Ko".

=== Cancellation ===
After a generation leap in 2025, the series ratings dropped drastically from 8+TRP to 4.5. The decision to end the show came abruptly, which surprised the cast members, especially lead actor Rahul Mazumdar expressed shock and disappointment noting he got to know the news only on short notice. After a successful 3-year run of 1245 episodes, the show ended on 30 November 2025.

== Adaptations ==
Star Jalsha's Anurager Chhowa is an official Bengali remake of Asianet's Karuthamuthu. A Hindi remake titled Dil Ko Tumse Pyaar Hua premiered on Star Plus on 15 July 2024, starring Aditi Tripathi and Akshit Sukhija. Karuthamuthu's Third Hindi remake, Dil Ko Tumse Pyaar Hua and Anurager Chhowa both are produced by same producer Mahendra Soni under Shree Venkatesh Films and follow same plot.

== Reception ==
TRP ratings
Week	Year	BARC viewership		Ref.
Week	Year	TRP	Rank	Ref.
Week 6	2022	8.1	1	
Week 7	2022	8.1	6	
Week 8	2022	7.7	7	
Week 9	2022	7.1	6	
Week 10	2022	7.4	6	
Week 11	2022	8.4	5	
Week 12	2022	8.5	3	
Week 13	2022	8.5	3	
Week 14	2022	7.9	3	
Week 15	2022	7.1	4	
Week 16	2022	6.9	5	
Week 17	2022	6.4	6	
Week 35	2023	7.6	2	
Week 36	2023	8.8	1	
Week 37	2023	8.9	1	
Week 38	2023	8.7	1	
Week 39	2023	9	1	
Week 40	2023	8.5	1	
Week 01	2024	7.1	6	
Week 02	2024	7.5	5	
Week 03	2024	7.8	4	
Week 04	2024	7.2	4	
Week 05	2024	7.3	5	
Week 06	2024	7.8	5	
Week 07	2024	6.8	7	
Week 28	2024	5.7	8	
Week 29	2024	5.9	6	

== Awards and nominations ==
At the Tolly Cine Samman 2024, director Anupam Hari received Best Director, while Dibyojyoti Dutta was honored with Best Actor in a Leading Role (Male).
