= Horogouri Pice Hotel =

2022 Indian television series

- Genre: Drama
- Written by: Dialogues; Sourav Sengupta
- Screenplay by: Ritom Ghoshal
- Story by: Nilanjana Sengupta
- Directed by: Pavel Ghosh
- Creative director: Rai Sengupta
- Starring: Suvosmita Mukherjee; Rahul Mazumdar; Arnab Banerjee
- Theme music composer: Shovon Ganguly
- Opening theme: "Horogouri Pice Hotel"
- Country of origin: India
- Original language: Bengali
- No. of seasons: 2
- No. of episodes: 767

Production
- Executive producer: Sourodip Nag
- Producers: Jisshu Sengupta; Nilanjona Sengupta
- Production location: Kolkata
- Cinematography: Sukanta Nag
- Editors: Nironjon Mondol; Dipok Hajra
- Running time: 20–22 minutes
- Production company: Jisshu Ujjwal Sengupta Production

Original release
- Network: Star Jalsha
- Release: 12 September 2022 – 26 January 2025

Horogouri Pice Hotel is an Indian Bengali drama television series which premiered on 12 September 2022 on Star Jalsha and also digitally available on Disney+ Hotstar.The show went off air on 26 January 2025 It stars Suvosmita Mukherjee, Rahul Mazumdar and Arnab Banarjee as the leads and Arunava Dey, Rahul Banerjee and Surabhi Mallick as main antagonists.

== Plot ==
The plot of the story revolves around a daughter of a rich family, Oishani and a highly educated girl adjusting in a middle-class family after her marriage. She and her husband Shankar then work in their successful hotel where they also face various challenges, mainly caused by the family's widowed daughter-in-law, Mitali.

After overcoming several trials and tribulations, including a misled separation of Oishani and Shankar, well planned by Mitali; the two reunite and expose the latter to the family, throwing her out of the house.

Oishani is pregnant living happily with her family, all set for her due-dates. Soon, she gives birth to a girl child, much neglected by the members of her family, who believe in the virtue of a boy-child creating more stature within society. Soon, all is well and Oishani decides to start focusing on a dream she's always strived to fulfil.

Oishani undergoes intensive training and becomes an IPS officer, while protecting her family and raising her daughter.

Later entire Ghosh family dies in a car accident caused by a business rival.

Dhriti, sole survivor of the accident is now grown up after she was rescued by a man and renamed Gouri.

== Cast ==
=== Main ===
- Suvosmita Mukherjee as
  - IPS Oishani Ghosh (née Chatterjee) - Shankar's wife, Dhriti's mother.
  - Dhriti "Dhee" (née Ghosh) Rai Chowdhury aka Gouri - Shankar and Oishani's daughter, Rudra's wife,
    - Anumegha Kahali as young Dhriti
- Rahul Mazumdar as Shankar Ghosh - Oishani's husband, Maheshwari and Satyakinkar's son, Dhriti's father.
- Indrasish Roy / Arnab Banerjee as Rudra Rai Chowdhury; Dhriti's husband.

=== Ghosh family ===
- Mithu Chakrabarty / Tulika Basu as Maheshwari Ghosh - Satyakinkar's wife; Prabhakar, Shankar, Bhaskar and Bani's mother; Jhilmil and Dhriti's grandmother.
- Anindya Sarkar as Satyakinkar Ghosh - Maheshwari's husband; Prabhakar, Shankar, Bhaskar and Bani's father; Jhilmil and Dhriti's grandfather.
- Surabhi Mallick as Mitali Ghosh - Prabhakar's wife;Piku's Mother.
- Jishnu Bhattacharya as Piku Ghosh - Mitali and Tapas' son; Prabhakar's adoptive son.
- Soumyadip Singha Roy as Dibakar Ghosh - Satyakinkar's nephew; Shiuli's husband;Gublu's father
- Taniya Roy as Shiuli Ghosh - Dibakar's wife;Gublu's mother
- Arunava Dey as Bhaskar Ghosh - Maheshwari and Satyakinkar's younger son.
- Soumi Banerjee as Bani Ghosh - Maheshwari and Satyakinkar's daughter.
- Shreya Chatterjee as Mohini - Ghosh family's maid.
- Rahul Banerjee as Prabhakar Ghosh - Mitali's estranged husband, Bhebli's ex-husband;Jhilmil's father;Piku's step-father; Maheshwari and Satayakinkar's son. as Main antagonist
- Satakshi Nandy as Bhebli- Prabhakar's ex- wife, Jhilmil's mother
- Rusha Mukherjee as Phuli Ghosh - Bhaskar's wife
- Swarup Dey as Kanishkar Ghosh - Satyakinkar's nephew, Debjani's husband
- Poonam Basak / Diyettima Ganguly as Debjani Ghosh (ńee Chatterjee) aka Debu - Sohini and Oishani's youngest sister, Kanishkar's wife.

=== Chatterjee/Roy Family ===
- Tania Kar as Sohini Roy (née Chatterjee) - Tapas's widow, Oishani and Debjani's sister.
- Manoj Ojha as Tapas Roy - Sohini's husband, Oishani's elder brother in-law and rival, Piku's father.(Dead)
- Sudip Mukherjee as Sohini, Oishani & Debu's father (Dead)
- Rupsha Mondal as Priyanka

=== Rai Chowdhury family ===
- Swagata Basu as Rudra's grandmother
- Subrata Mitra as Pratap Rai Chowdhury, Rudra's father
- Unknown as Rudra's mother
- Unknown as Rudra's elder sister
- Unknown as Rituraj Rai Chowdhury
- Unknown as Priya aka Dhee (Fake)
- Mahua Haldar as Damini aka Guru Maa

=== Others ===
- Jayanta Das as Bilu - Shankar's friend.
- Soma Banerjee as Mitali's mother, Tapas's cousin sister.
- Olivia Malakar as Sharmistha - Oishani's friend, Shankar's former fiancé.
- Gautam Mukherjee as Mahesh Agarwal - A builder, Tapas's partner.
- Tathagata Mukherjee as Indrajit Sen aka Khokon.
- Ankushree Maity as Malini.
- Biplab Banerjee as Haradhan Sarkhel aka Gurudev as Main Antagonist
- Dipanjan Bhattacharya
- Mishor Bose
- Laboni Ghosh
- Prantik Banerjee
- Ayesha Bhattacharya
- Atri Bhattacharya
- Buddhadeb Bhattacharya
- Samm Bhattacharya

=== Guests appearance ===
- Roosha Chatterjee as Ushoshi Ghosh - an IPS officer, Extended Cameo Appearance from Tomay Amay Mile.
- Srijla Guha as Special Guest.
- Aparajita Auddy as Judge in cookery competition (Cameo appearance)
