= Pandiyoda Galatta Thaangala =

2016 Indian film by ST Gunasekaran

- Release poster
- Directed by: ST Gunasekaran
- Starring: Nithin Sathya; Raksha Raj
- Cinematography: K Suresh
- Edited by: Sabari Periyasamy
- Music by: Sugumar
- Production company: Virokshiya Media
- Release date: 10 June 2016
- Country: India
- Language: Tamil

Pandiyoda Galatta Thaangala (transl. Can't handle Pandi's mischief) is a 2016 Indian Tamil-language horror comedy film directed by ST Gunasekaran and starring Nithin Sathya and Raksha Raj while Mayilsamy plays the title role.

== Plot ==
Pandi, a monkey, becomes a ghost and disturbs people around him.

== Cast ==
- Nithin Sathya as Sathya
- Raksha Raj
- Yogi Babu as Thief
- Mayilsamy as Pandi
- Singampuli as Aspiring actor
- Imman Annachi as Mansion owner
- Manobala as Ghostbuster
- Swaminathan
- Lollu Sabha Manohar
- Kovai Senthil
- Theni Murugan
- Vengal Rao

== Music ==
The music of the film is composed by Sugumar.

Track listing
No.	Title	Lyrics	Singer(s)	Length
1.	"Smart Phone"	Gana Bala	Gana Bala	3:53
2.	"Namma Thala Annachi"	Sasi	Kowsik	4:29
3.	"Neeyum Bommai"	Marana Gana Viji	Marana Gana Viji	3:42
Total length:				12:04

== Reception ==
M. Suganth of The Times of India gave the film a rating of 1/5 and said that "Forget the ghost, the only atrocity that we find here is the existence of this thoroughly uninspiring film". A critic from iFlicks opined that "Pandiyoda Galatta Thangala leaves us wanting to leave early". A critic from The Times of India Samayam gave the film a rating of 1.5/5 and criticised its writing in regards to other horror flicks. Critics from Maalaimalar and Dinamalar called the film "unbearable".
