= Khukumoni Home Delivery =

Indian Bengali television series

- Genre: Drama
- Created by: Blues Productions
- Developed by: Blues Productions
- Screenplay by: Snehasish Chakraborty
- Story by: Snehasish Chakraborty
- Directed by: Prasenjit Ray
- Creative director: Snehasish Chakraborty
- Starring: Dipanwita Rakshit; Rahul Mazumdar
- Voices of: Chandrika
- Opening theme: "Khukumoni"
- Composer: Snehasish Chakraborty
- Country of origin: India
- Original language: Bengali
- No. of seasons: 1
- No. of episodes: 180

Production
- Executive producers: Runa Ghatak (Blues Productions); Samajita, Saptara & Sohini (Star Jalsha)
- Producer: Snehasish Chakraborty
- Cinematography: Debabrata Mallick
- Editors: Subhajeet Halder; Dipon
- Camera setup: Multi-camera
- Running time: 22 minutes (approx.)
- Production company: Blues Productions

Original release
- Network: Star Jalsha
- Release: 1 November 2021 – 1 May 2022

Khukumoni Home Delivery is an Indian Bengali-language drama television series that premiered on 1 November 2021 on Bengali entertainment channel Star Jalsha. It is also available on the online streaming platform Disney+ Hotstar. This show is produced by Snehasish Chakraborty under the banner of Blues Productions. It stars Dipanwita Rakshit and Rahul Mazumdar.

== Plot ==
Khukumoni Home Delivery shows the struggle of an orphan girl who delivers food from home to home. It also shows the story of a mentally unstable man who loves music.

== Cast ==
=== Main ===
- Dipanwita Rakshit as Khukumoni Das Deb – A home delivery agent; Bihan's wife (2021-2022)
- Rahul Mazumdar as Bihan Deb – Bhisma and Ivana's son; Nipa's stepson; Palash, Shree and Biyas's half-brother; Khukumoni's husband (2021-2022)

=== Recurring ===
- Dipankar De as Ashutosh Deb – Mohitosh and Basudha's brother; Bhisma, Bhaskar and Papiya's father; Bihan, Palash, Shree and Biyas's grandfather (2021-2022)
- Kanchana Moitra as Nipa Deb – Bhisma's second wife; Palash, Shree and Biyas's mother; Bihan's step-mother (2021-2022)
- Biplab Banerjee as Bhisma Deb – Ashutosh's elder son; Bhaskar and Papiya's brother; Ivana and Nipa's husband; Bihan, Palash, Shree and Biyas's father (2021-2022)
- Lopamudra Sinha as Ivana Deb – Bhisma's first wife; Bihan's mother (deceased) (2021)
- Soma Dey as Basudha Chowdhury – Ashutosh and Mohitosh's sister; Bhisma and Bhaskar's aunt (2021-2022)
- Gourab Ghoshal as Palash Deb – Bhisma and Nipa's elder son; Shree and Biyas's brother; Bihan's half-brother; Kriti's husband (2021-2022)
- Prarona Bhattacharya as Kriti Deb – Palash's wife (2021-2022)
- Sreemoyee Chattoraj as Shree Deb – Bhisma and Nipa's daughter; Palash and Biyas's sister; Bihan's half-sister (2021-2022)
- Sahamita Acharya as Biyash Deb, Bihan's Sister
- Manishankar Banerjee as Mohitosh Deb – Ashutosh and Basudha's brother; Hema's husband (2021)
- Tapasi Roychowdhury as Hema Deb – Mohitosh's wife (2021)
- Arpita Dutta Chowdhury as Papiya Deb – Ashutosh's daughter; Bisma and Bhaskar's sister (2021-2022)
- Mitali Bhattacharya as Papri Deb – Ashutosh's niece (2021-2022)
- Sankar Sanku Chakraborty as Bhaskar Deb – Ashutosh's younger son; Bhisma and Papiya's brother; Kangana's husband (2021-2022)
- Rii Sen as Kangana Deb – Bhaskar's wife (2021-2022)
- Srabanti Malakar as Khukumoni's aunt (2021-2022)
- Nayanika Sarkar as Nayana – Bihan's fiancé (2021-2022)

== Reception ==
=== TRP Ratings ===
Week	Year	BARC Viewership		Ref.
Week	Year	TRP	Rank	Ref.
Week 44	2021	7.5	4	
Week 45	2021	7.8	5	
Week 46	2021	8.4	5	
Week 47	2021	8.9	2	
Week 48	2021	9.0	2	
Week 49	2021	9.1	3	
Week 50	2021	9.3	3	
Week 51	2021	9.9	2	
Week 52	2021	10.2	2	
Week 1	2022	10.2	2	
Week 2	2022	8.6	4	
Week 3	2022	9.1	4	
Week 4	2022	8.4	5	
Week 5	2022	8.1	7	
Week 6	2022	7.3	8	
Week 7	2022	7.4	9	
Week 8	2022	7.3	8	
Week 9	2022	7.5	9	

== Adaptations ==
Language	Title	Original release	Network(s)	Last aired	Notes
Hindi	Banni Chow Home Delivery बन्नी चाऊ होम डेलिवरी	30 May 2022	StarPlus	3 January 2023	Remake
