= Bal Gopal Kare Dhamaal =

- Genre: Drama
- Written by: Vikas Kapoor; Smita Nair Jain
- Screenplay by: Shruti Tiwari
- Creative director: Uditanshu Mehta
- Country of origin: India
- Original language: Hindi
- No. of seasons: 1
- No. of episodes: 164

Production
- Camera setup: Multi-camera
- Running time: Approx. 23 minutes

Original release
- Network: BIG Magic
- Release: 22 December 2014 – 31 July 2015

Bal Gopal Kare Dhamaal is an Indian drama television series which premiered on 22 December 2014. It airs on Big Magic through Monday to Friday. Satyajit Sharma is on lead role. Meet Mukhi is child actor playing as youngest avatar of Lord Krishna or Bal Gopal.

== Cast ==
- Satyajit Sharma as Gopal Sharma or Sharmaji
- Meet Mukhi as Bal Gopal
- Pragati Mehra as Saadhna Sharma, Sharmaji 's wife
- Jashree T. as Saadhna 's Mother
- Ashish Dixit as Bablu Awasthi
- Aakash Pandey as Pyare
- Archana Karmakar as Hema Ssingh singh
- Anand Jaiswal As Ranjit Jha
- Brindra Parekh CAMEO
