= Satyajit Sharma =

Indian film and television actor

- Born: Mahendragarh, Haryana, India
- Education: University of Delhi
- Occupation: Actor

Satyajit Sharma is an Indian actor who works in Indian films and television.

== Filmography ==
Year	Film	Role	Notes
1997	Darmiyaan: In Between	Aslam	
2003	Hazaaron Khwaishein Aisi	Maharaj's elder son	
2004	Chameli	Police Inspector	
2004	Inteqam: The Perfect Game	Parmar	
2005	Ek Khiladi Ek Haseena	Chief Minister	
2006	Don	Mystery Man	
2007	1971	Indian Commander at LOC Post	
2009	Kaminey	Francis	
2009	Paa	Jaikirt	
2011	Yeh Faasley		
2019	Uri: The Surgical Strike	Lt. General Ajay Garewal	
2023	The Archies	Hal Cooper	
2025	L2: Empuraan	Masood	Malayalam film
2025	Ghich Pich	Naresh Bansal	
2026	Assi	Opposition lawyer	

== Television ==
Year	Title	Role	Notes
2004–2005	Kabhi Haan Kabhi Naa	Kartik	
2008–2014	Balika Vadhu	Basant Dharamveer Singh	
2009	Kitani Mohabbat Hai	Darshan Kumar Punj	
2014–2015	Bal Gopal Kare Dhamaal	Gopal Sharma	
2016	Ek Duje Ke Vaaste	Ramnath Malhotra	
2017–2018	Half Marriage	Vanraaj Kanojia	
2018	Chandrashekhar	Sitaram Tiwari	
2019	Dil Toh Happy Hai Ji	Kulwant Khosla	
2019–2021	Yeh Hai Chahatein	Balraj Khurana	
2020	Bicchoo Ka Khel	Anil Chaubey	
2021	Dev DD 2	Awasthi	
2022	Sab Satrangi	Daddy	
