= Santhwanam (TV series) =

2020 TV series

- Genre: Family drama
- Created by: Priya Thambi
- Based on: Pandian Stores; Pandian Stores 2
- Developed by: M. Renjith
- Written by: Season 1; J. Pallassery Apsara; Season 2; Krishna Poojappura
- Directed by: Season 1; Adithyan; Season 2; Anzar Khan (2024-2025); Dhanesh Ambika (2025-present)
- Starring: Season 1; Rajeev Parameshwar; Chippy Renjith; Girish Nambiar; Raksha Raj; Sajin TP; Gopika Anil; Achu Sugandh; Season 2; Krishnakumar Menon; Lavanya Nair; Girish Gangadharan; Aiswarya Rajesh; Bibin Benny; Sai Lakshmi; Deepan Murali; Meghna Vincent
- Voices of: K. S. Siddharthan; Devi S.; Vineeth Viswanathan; Devayani; Shanker Lal; Parvathy S Prakash; Jesny Johny
- Theme music composer: Saanand George
- Country of origin: India
- Original language: Malayalam
- No. of seasons: 2
- No. of episodes: 1700

Production
- Producers: Season 1; Chippy Renjith; Season 2; P Ramadevi
- Production location: Trivandrum
- Cinematography: Manoj Narayan; Alex U. Thomas
- Editors: Season 1; Pradeep Bhagvath; Season 2; Pramod Nenmara
- Camera setup: Multiple-camera setup
- Running time: 22 minutes
- Production companies: Season 1; Rejaputra Visual Media; Avanthika creations (banner); Season 2; Green TV

Original release
- Network: Asianet; JioHotstar
- Release: 21 September 2020 – present

Related
- Pandian Stores; Pandian Stores 2

Santhwanam (transl. Consolation) is an Indian Malayalam-language soap opera. The first season directed by Adithyan aired from 21 September 2020 to 27 January 2024 on Asianet and airs on-demand through JioHotstar. It is an official remake of the Tamil soap opera Pandian Stores and the climax of the season is inspired from 1993 Malayalam film Vatsalyam. It stars Rajeev Parameshwar, Chippy Renjith, Girish Nambiar, Raksha Raj, Sajin TP, Gopika Anil, Achu Sugandh. The second season of the show, Santhwanam 2 which is a remake of Pandian Stores 2 premiered on 17 June 2024. It is a standalone sequel of Santhwanam. It stars Krishnakumar Menon, Lavanya Nair, Girish Gangadharan, Aiswarya Rajesh, Bibin Benny, Sai Lakshmi, Deepan Murali, Meghna Vincent in lead roles. It is one of the longest running Malayalam soap opera.

== Series overview ==
Season	No.of episodes	Original broadcast		Ref.
Season	No.of episodes	First aired	Last aired	Ref.
1	1002	21 September 2020	27 January 2024	
2	700	17 June 2024	present	

== Plot ==
=== Season 1 ===
Krishnan's four sons (Balakrishnan, Harikrishnan, Shivaramakrishnan aka Shivan, and Kannan) run Krishna Stores, a famous grocery store in their hometown Ambalathara.

Balakrishnan is married to Sreedevi, who leads the Krishna stores with him and looks after Lakshmi, Balan's paralyzed mother. Sreedevi raises her brothers-in-law as her sons.

Hari gets engaged to Anjali, who loved Hari since they were children. However, Hari was in love with his college mate Aparna. So, Anjali marries Shivan, while Aparna marries Hari.(Kannan), during this point in time Lakshmi feels disappointed that Hari married Aparna so she doesn't give blessings to Hari and Aparna except to Anjali and Shiva. Savithri and Jayanthi insult Sreedevi and humiliate her. Aparna is not used to the Santhwanam house's interior. The plot centers on Devi and how she brings the joint family back together after the arrival of the new in-laws, Anjali and Aparna. And then it is revealed that Kannan like Aishwarya

Hari and Aparna are blessed with a baby girl. Shivan opens a tea stall, which is closed by Thambi. Kannan goes to Chennai to study. Meanwhile, Lakshmi Amma passes away. During these days the family passes through a series of financial crises due to Anjali and Sivan's previous furniture business and Krishna Stores' burn. But after some days Susan visited the family and handed over a Thirty lakh cheque to Anjali as she got as a balance amount from her client. The family cleared all their financial issues and lived peacefully.

The story leaps five years, Hari and Aparna started an advertising agency. But it got stopped due to their inefficiency in business. Hari moved back to Krishna Stores. Shivan's Ootupura has turned into a local sensation, winning the hearts and palates of natives and Anjali is handling the catering section of their venture. A few days later, the family learns that Anjali was pregnant. One day Kannan returns to the house but behaves differently. Kannan plans to start a new company in Chennai with his friends for which he needs at least 15 lakhs. He requests Balan to give the money as the house is in his name. Learning that the family may be divided after partition, Appu tries to separate Devu from Devi. Late, Balan promises that they will not interfere in any matters of Devu this cooling Appu. Devi and Balan are heartbroken in the absence of Devu. Balan made arrangements for the partition of the family so that Kannan would let his money. Balan and Devi leave the house after writing a letter to family members. The family mourns after learning about their disappearance. Later, Kurup informs the family that Balan and Devi purposefully avoided children for taking care of their siblings. This made everybody heartbroken.

Three years later, Kannan in regret decides to leave his business plans and runs Krishna's Stores. Anjali gives birth to a male child, Balakrishnan (Balu Kuttan). Hari is working as a regional manager in an advertising company. Aparna is also working in an IT company remotely. Devootty is grown up. Shivan's friend, Rahul informs him that he saw Balan and Devi at Suchindram temple. Hari, Shivan, and Kannan find Devi and Balan. They are running a shop of flowers and Pooja materials near the temple. They both have a girl child, Lakshmi. The brothers insist Balan and Devi accompany them to Santhwanam which Balan denies. Later, Devi promises them that they will visit Santhwanam during Onam. The brothers further tell them that they will visit them again with Appu and Anju. The season ends with teary-eyed Balan and Devi bidding goodbye to the brothers.

=== Season 2 ===
The second season of the show is a standalone story and has no connection to the events or characters of the first season.

The season delves into the intense rivalry between two families, Krishnamangalam and Devamangalam, highlighting the strength of family ties and the complexities of interpersonal relationships. The drama begins to unfold when Balan, an orphan adopted by the Krishnamangalam household, marries the youngest daughter, Gomathi. This causes the two families became enemies. 28 years later, Balan has become a well-known figure in society, the proud owner of Gomathi Stores, and the strict head of the Devamangalam family. His life revolves around his perfect family and the thriving business he has built. Balan's elder son Anand, is not married due to a love failure. His second son, Akash was in love with Meenakshi and he married her without their parents' knowledge. Even though Balan and Gomathi didn't accept her initially, they slowly began liking each other. Their youngest son, Aryan is studying in college. After some days, Gomathi, Aryan and Meenakshi visited Guruvayoor temple to pray for Anand's marriage. In the same time, Mithra, Gomathi's nephew eloped from Devamangalam with jewels to marry her lover Midhun, who is a fraudster. They stayed in the same hotel where Gomathi is also staying. Midhun cheated Mithra and ran way with her ornaments. On knowing this incident Gomathi decided Aryan to get married with Mithra so as to secure her life. Both of them married and they told to Balan that Mithra was in love with Aryan.

== Cast ==
=== Season 1 ===
Main

- Rajeev Parameshwar as Balakrishnan Pillai a.k.a. Balan: Devi's husband, Krishnan and Lakshmi's elder son; Hari, Shivan and Kannan's elder brother; Shankaran's nephew via Lakshmi; Bhadran's and Sudha's nephew via Krishna; Lakshmi’s father; Devika and Balu's paternal uncle: He is the householder who runs a merchant with his brothers. He is a bit educated.
- Chippy Renjith as Sreedevi Balakrishnan a.k.a. Devi: Balan's wife; Madhavan and Subhadra’s daughter; Lakshmi's (the younger one) mother
- Sajin T. P. as Shivaramakrishnan Pillai a.k.a. Shivan: Anjali's husband, Krishnan and Lakshmi's third son; Balan and Hari's younger brother and Kannan's elder brother; Balu's father, Shankaran's nephew via Lakshmi; Bhadran's and Sudha's nephew via Krishna
- Gopika Anil as Anjali Shivaramakrishnan a.k.a. Anju: Shiva's wife; Hari's ex-fiancé; Shankaran and Savitri's daughter; Balu’s mother, Jayanti's cousin; Lakshmi's niece and daughter-in-law; Lakshmi and Devika's aunt
- Raksha Raj as Aparna Harikrishnan a.k.a. Appu: Hari's wife, Thampi and Ambika's elder daughter and heiress of Amaravati; Devika's mother; Balu and Lakshmi's aunt; Ammu's sister; Rajalakshmi and Rajeshwari's niece
- Girish Nambiar as HariKrishnan Pillai: a.k.a. Hari: Appu's husband, Krishnan and Lakshmi's second son; Shiva and Kannan's elder brother and Balan's younger brother; Devika's father and Balu and Lakshmi's uncle
- Achu Sugandh as Muralikrishnan Pillai a.k.a. Kannan: Aishwarya's boyfriend; Krishnan and Lakshmi's youngest son; Balan, Hari, Shivan's younger brother; Shankaran's nephew via Lakshmi; Bhadran's and Sudha's nephew via Krishna; Devika, Balu and Lakshmi’s paternal uncle

Recurring

- Apsara Ratnakaran as Jayanthi Sethumadhavan, Anjali's cousin, Savithri's niece (paternal); Sethu's wife; Balu and Lakshmi's aunt
- Baby Izzah Fathima/ Baby Nila as Devika Harikrishnan a.k.a. Devooty: Daughter of Hari and Aparna; granddaughter of Krishnan, Lakshmi via Hari and Thampi, Ambika via Appu
- Girija Preman as Lakshmi Krishnan a.k.a. Lakshmiyamma: Balan, Hari, Shivan, and Kannan's mother; Devika, Balu and Lakshmi’s paternal grandmother; Shankaran's sister (Dead)
- Manjusha Martin as Aishwarya Gopinathan a.k.a. Achu: Kannan's girlfriend, Gopinathan and Sudha's daughter; Krishna, Bhadran's niece; Abhishek's sister
- Yathikumar as Shivashankaran a.k.a. Shankaran: Lakshmi's brother; Savithri's husband; Anjali's father; Balan, Hari, Shiva and Kannan's maternal uncle and Balu's maternal grandfather
- Bijesh Avanoor as Sethumadhavan : Devi's brother; Unni's father; Balan's best friend, Jayanthi's husband and Lakshmi’s maternal uncle
- Divya Binu as Malikapurackal Savithri Shivashankaran a.k.a. Savitri: Shankaran's wife; Anjali's mother; Jayanthi's paternal aunt and Balu’s maternal grandmother
- (Late) Kailas Nath as Narayana Pillai a.k.a. Pillai: A helper in Krishna Stores and father figure to the brothers
- Saji Surya as Shathrudharan Pillai a.k.a. Shathru: Pillai's nephew
- Rohit Ved as Rajasekharan Thampi a.k.a. Thampi: Ambika's husband, Rajeshwari and Rajalakshmi's brother, Appu and Ammu's father; Devika's maternal grandfather
- Rajamouli S. S. as Mahindra: Thampi's steward
- Mohan Ayroor as Bhadran Pillai: Lalita's husband; Balan, Hari, Shiva, Kannan's paternal uncle; Achu's maternal uncle; Krishna, Sudha's brother
- Dr. Nita Gosh as Hemambika Rajasekharan a.k.a. Ambika: Thampi's wife; Appu and Ammu's mother; Devika's maternal grandmother
- Aju Thomas as Varun Bhadran Pillai. Lalita and Bhadran's son; Balan, Hari, Shiva, Kannan, Aishwarya, Abhishek's cousin brother; Arun's elder brother
- Unknown as Arun Bhadran Pillai. Lalita and Bhadran's son; Balan, Hari, Shiva, Kannan, Aishwarya, Abhishek's cousin brother; Varun's younger brother
- Pramod Mani as Abhishek Gopinathan: Achu's brother; Gopinath and Sudha's son; Varun, Arun, Balan, Hari, Shiva, Kannan's cousin brother; Krishna, Bhadran's nephew
- Sanjana Chandran as Gopinathan: Sudha's husband; Abhishek and Aishwarya's father
- Sindhu Manu Varma as Sudha Gopinathan: Gopinathan's wife; Aishwarya and Abhishek's mother; Krishnan and Bhadran's sister; Balan, Hari, Shiva, Kannan, Arun, Varun's paternal aunt
- Deepika Mohan as Lalitha Bhadran: Bhadran's wife; Arun and Varun's mother
- Hareendran as Rahul: Shivan's friend
- Shilpa Shaji as Malu: Rahul's wife
- Renjith Renju as Sumesh: Shivan's friend
- Geetha Nair as Subhadra: Devi and Sethu's mother; Unni's paternal grandmother and Lakshmi’s maternal grandmother
- Zeenath as Rajeshwari: Thampi's elder sister, Appu, and Ammu's aunt
- Saritha Balakrishnan as Rajalakshmi a.k.a. Lachu: Thampi's younger sister, Appu and Ammu's aunt
- Kalyani as Amritha Thampi a.k.a. Ammu: Thampi and Ambika's daughter, Appu's younger sister
- Prabha R. Krishnan as Vanaja
- J. Padmanabhan Thampi as Thomachan
- Mithun M. K. as Aneesh
- Archana Krishna as Susan
- Athira Praveen as Manjima: Hari's classmate and colleague
- Sreelakshmi Sreekumar as Jancy: Anju's friend
- Liju Mathew Abraham as Deepu: Hari's friend
- Nihas Khan as Rajesh: Shivan's friend
- Renjith as Sumesh: Shivan's friend
- Unknown as Balakrishnan Shivaramakrishna a.k.a. Balu: Son of Shivan and Anjali; grandson of Krishnan and Lakshmi via Shivan and Shankaran and Savitri via Anjali (photo appearance)
- Baby Evelyn as Lakshmi Balakrishnan: Daughter of Balan and Devi; granddaughter of Krishnan and Lakshmi via Balan and Subhadra via Devi
- Arjun Sunil as Dakshinamurthy

=== Season 2 ===
Main

- Krishnakumar Menon as Balan: Gomathi's husband; Anuja, Anand, Akash, Aryan and Anusree's father, owner of Gomathi Stores
- Girish Gangadharan as Aryan: Balan and Gomathi's youngest son, Mithra's husband
- Sai Lakshmi(2024-2025, 2026-present)/Parvathy Nair(2025-2026) as Mithra: Aryan's wife, Ananda Varma's daughter
- Aiswarya Rajesh as Meenakshi: Akash's wife
- Deepan Murali as Anand: Balan and Gomathi's eldest son, Sreedevi's husband
- Bibin Benny as Akash: Balan and Gomathi's second son, Meenakshi's husband
- Meghna Vincent as Sreedevi: Anand's wife
- Roslin/Devi Menon as Indiramma: Ananda Varma, Achyutha Varma, Dharman and Gomathi's mother

Recurring

- Manju Vijeesh as Rajasree: Achyutha Varma's wife, Alok's mother
- Saranya Visakh as Anuja Krishnadas: Balan and Gomathi's elder daughter
- Gowri/Aarcha S Nair as Anusree: Balan and Gomathi's younger daughter
- Aswin Puthiya Veettil as Achyutha Varma: Gomathi's brother, Indiramma's son, Alok's father
- Abees P Saif as Ananda Varma: Mithra's father, Gomathi's brother, Indiramma's son
- Ashish Kannan as Alok: Achyutha Varma's son
- Niveditha/Archana Renjith as Nandhitha: Ananda Varma's wife, Mithra's mother
- R J Gaddafi as Midhun: Mithra's ex-lover
- Arun Mohan as Dharman: Mithra's uncle
- Kottayam Rasheed as Udayabhanu: Sreedevi's father
- Karthika Kannan as Sreekala: Sreedevi's mother
- Shilpa Shiva as Sreevidhya: Sreedevi's sister
- Aneesh Swaminathan as Krishnadas: Anuja's husband

Cameo appearance

- Sreeram Ramachandran as Saran: Jankiyamma's son, Kavya's husband
- Ardra Das as Kavya: Saran's wife
- Shobha Mohan as Janakiyamma: Saran's mother
- Prajin Prathap as Nandanan
- Rajeev Parameshwar as Balakrishnan(Promo only)
- Krishnakumar Prem as Sethu (reprising from Snehakkoottu)
- Shilji Mariya as Pallavi (reprising from Snehakkoottu)

== Production ==
=== Season 1 ===
The series is produced by Chippy Renjith after success of their previous venture Vanambadi. In 2021, the second wave of COVID-19 resulted in the show pausing production for about 2 months. The director of the show, Adithyan died on 19 October 2023 due to heart attack.

=== Season 2 ===
The teaser of the second season was released on 3 May 2024. After that several audience enquired whether it is sequel to the first season. But it is clarified by Gopika Anil who played lead role in the first season that the new season will follow a new story with new characters.

In April 2025, actor Rajeev Parameshwar revealed that Chippy Renjith, who acted in and produced the first season of Santhwanam, and her husband Renjith, who co-produced the show, opted out of Santhwanam 2 due to their commitments to the film Thudarum and the JioHotstar web series Love Under Construction. Chippy informed the original cast that the second season would feature a completely new storyline, that she would not be part of it, and that they were free to join if interested. However, since it wasn’t a continuation, the entire original cast chose not to return. Consequently, a different production house took over the show with an entirely new cast.

== Reception ==
=== Season 1 ===
The first season of the show was one of the top rated shows in Malayalam. It is well known for romantic performance of the lead pair known as "Shivanjali" played by Sajin and Gopika Anil.

=== Season 2 ===
In contrast, second season opened with a relatively lower performance, debuting at sixth position in TRP ratings. It improved to fourth position by September 2024 but declined again to fifth position by November 2024.

Amid declining TRP performance, show's time slot was shifted from 7:00 PM to evening slot of 6:30 PM, and it later fell to eighth position in TRP rankings.
