= Mahanadigai season 1 =

Mahanadigai
- Season 1
- Hosted by: RJ Vijay
- Judges: Saritha; Vijay Antony; Abhirami Gopikumar
- No. of contestants: 8
- Winner: Hemathi
- No. of episodes: 18

Release
- Original network: Zee Tamil
- Original release: 5 October 2024 – 2 February 2025

Season chronology
- Next → Season 2

Mahanadigai season 1 is the first season of the Indian Tamil-language competition reality show Mahanadigai. It is aired on Zee Tamil every Sunday at 21:30 and premiered on 5 October 2024 and ended on 2 February 2025 with 18 episodes. It is also available for streaming on ZEE5. The show's first episode premiered on 5 October 2024 and aired on Saturday and Sunday at 20:30, then moved to every Sunday.

The show is a competition wherein 8 talented young females talents and introduced new heroines to the television industry. RJ Vijay was the host of the show, which was judged by actress Saritha, Abhirami Gopikumar, actor and music director Vijay Antony. The show won by Hemathi.

== Contestants ==
| S. No. | Name | Home town | Entry episode | Episode exited | Status |
|---|---|---|---|---|---|
| 1 | Kiruthika Swaminathan | Thanjavur | Episode 1 | Episode 18 | Finalist |
| 2 | Chandhini Kaur | Malaysia | Episode 1 | Episode 18 | Finalist |
| 3 | Kavipriya | Sri Lanka | Episode 1 | | |
| 4 | Aiswarya | Erode | Episode 1 | | |
| 5 | Hemathi | Salem | Episode 2 | Episode 18 | Winner |
| 6 | Aiswarya Ragupathi | Thoothukudi | Episode 2 | Episode 18 | |
| 7 | Jofna Alice | Coimbatore | Episode 2 | | Runner Up |
| 8 | Agasthiya | Viluppuram | Episode 2 | Episode 18 | Finalist |

== Mentors ==
- Britto Mano, a television actor. He played the main role in Thavamai thavamirundhu serial which aired on Zee Tamil.
- Mohammed Ansar, a Tamil anchor and comedian.
- Vimal, a television actor. He is best known for his role as Karikalan in the television series Ethirneechal.
- Vasanth Vasi, a television actor. He is mainly known for his role of Oru Oorla Oru Rajakumari and Agni Natchathiram.
- Balaji Thiyagarajan Dayalan, an actor, who works predominantly in Tamil cinema and a television series. He is best known for his performances in series such as Raja Rani 2.
- Saravana Vickram a television actor. He is known for portraying Kannan in Pandian Stores which aired on Star Vijay. He is also known for his participation in the reality show Bigg Boss 7.
- Viraat a television actor who mainly works in the Kannada and Tamil languages. He is mainly known for his lead role in the serials Perazhagi and Anbe Vaa.
- Irfan an actor, who has appeared in Tamil films and television serials. He is known for his roles as Vineeth in Kana Kaanum Kaalangal and as Shakthi Saravanan in Saravannan Meenatchi 2 which aired on Star Vijay.

== Episodes ==
| No. overall | No. in season | Title | Original release date | Duration |
|---|---|---|---|---|
| 1 | 1 | "Episode 1 & 2: The Grand Launch" | 5 October 2024 | 120 minutes |
| 2 | 2 | "Episode 1 & 2: The Grand Launch" | 6 October 2024 | 120 minutes |
The show was launched with the introduction of Host, Judges, Contestants, Mentors. film director, film producer and screenwriter N. Lingusamy joined as the guest with Zee Tamil's actress.
| 3 | 3 | "Episode 3: Iconic recreation (மறக்குமா நெஞ்சம்)" | 13 October 2024 | 127 minutes |
Recreating a scene from Tamil films: (Chandhini Kaur, Aiswarya Ragupathi, Jofna Alice, Aiswarya are Won golden performance). Jofna won first Golden Ticket.
| 4 | 4 | "Episode 4: Movie Recreation Round" | 20 October 2024 | 108 minutes |
Movie Recreation from Tamil films: (Agasthiya, Kiruthika, Hemathi, Aiswarya Ragupathi and Aiswarya are Won golden performance). Aiswarya Ragupathi won Golden Ticket. Chandhini Kaur and Jofna's performances were not telecasted in this episode.
| 5 | 5 | "Episode 5: Dance Recreation Round" | 27 October 2024 | 55 minutes |
Dance Recreation from Tamil films: (Jofna, Hemathi, and Aiswarya Ragupathi won golden performance). Hemathi won Golden Ticket. Chandhini Kaur's performances was not telecasted in this episode.
| 6 | 6 | "Episode 6: One on One Battle: Live Performance Round" | 3 November 2024 | 107 minutes |
One on One Battle with 4 rounds of Live Skit Performances. Battles consists of Hemathi vs Agasthiya, Kavipriya vs Kiruthika, Aiswarya Ragupathi vs Jofna, and Aiswarya vs. Chandhini. (Agasthiya, Aiswarya Ragupathi, Chandhini, Jofna and Kiruthika won golden performances). Chandhini Kaur won Golden Ticket.
| 7 | 7 | "Episode 6: Romantic Song Recreation" | 10 November 2024 | 72 minutes |
Creating Iconic romantic film songs: All the teams won Golden Performances. Hemathi won Golden Ticket.
| 8 | 8 | "Episode 8: Family Round (Part 1)" | 17 November 2024 | 72 minutes |
Every contestant's family member joins them for a special live performances. AiswaryA, Chandhini, Jofna and Kiruthika performed in this episode.
| 9 | 9 | "Episode 9: Family Round (Part 2)" | 24 November 2024 | 78 minutes |
Every contestant's family member joins them for a special live performances. Hemathi, Aiswarya Ragupathi, Agasthiya & Kavipriya performed in this episode. Hemathi won Golden Ticket.
| 10 | 10 | "Episode 10: Action Round" | 1 December 2024 | 74 minutes |
Contestants are take part in stunt training. They are paired in duo and perform action scenes.
| 11 | 11 | "Episode 11: Devotional Round" | 8 December 2024 | 0 minutes |
Contestants deliver astounding live performances for devotional round.

== Set performances ==
=== Iconic Recreation (episode: 3) ===
| Contestant | Mentor | Film | Score | | | Round status |
| Contestant | Mentor | Film | Vijay Antony | Saritha | Abhirami | Round status |
|---|---|---|---|---|---|---|
| Chandhini Kaur | Viraat | Kushi | 5/5 stars | 5/5 stars | 5/5 stars | Golden Performance |
| Aiswarya Ragupathi | Balaji Thiyagarajan | Sindhu Bhairavi | 5/5 stars | 5/5 stars | 5/5 stars | Golden Performance |
| Kiruthika | Saravana Vickram | 7G Rainbow Colony | 4/5 stars | 4.5/5 stars | 4/5 stars | |
| Aiswarya | Vasanth Vasi | Vallavan | 5/5 stars | 5/5 stars | 5/5 stars | Golden Performance |
| Hemathi | Sabaris | Pithamagan | 3/5 stars | 3/5 stars | 4/5 stars | |
| Jofna | Irfan | Michael Madana Kama Rajan | 5/5 stars | 5/5 stars | 5/5 stars | Golden Performance |
| Agasthiya | Anser | Thimiru | 5/5 stars | 5/5 stars | 4.5/5 stars | |
| Kavipriya | Britto Mano | Thevar Magan | 4/5 stars | 4/5 stars | 3/5 stars | |

=== Movie Recreation (episode: 4) ===
| Contestant | Mentor | Film | Score | | | Round status |
| Contestant | Mentor | Film | Vijay Antony | Saritha | Abhirami | Round status |
|---|---|---|---|---|---|---|
| Agasthiya | Anser | Karakattakkaran | 5/5 stars | 5/5 stars | 5/5 stars | Golden Performance |
| Kiruthika | Saravana Vickram | Anbe Vaa | 5/5 stars | 5/5 stars | 5/5 stars | Golden Performance |
| Hemathi | Sabaris | Paruthiveeran | 5/5 stars | 5/5 stars | 5/5 stars | Golden Performance |
| Aiswarya Ragupathi | Balaji Thiyagarajan | Kizhakku Cheemayile | 5/5 stars | 5/5 stars | 5/5 stars | Golden Performance |
| Aiswarya | Vasanth Vasi | Thillana Mohanambal | 5/5 stars | 5/5 stars | 5/5 stars | Golden Performance |
| Kavipriya | Britto Mano | Mouna Ragam | 4.5/5 stars | 5/5 stars | 4.5/5 stars | |
| Jofna | Irfan | Moondram Pirai | 0/5 stars | 0/5 stars | 0/5 stars | Not Telecasted |
| Chandhini Kaur | Viraat | Vinnaithaandi Varuvaayaa | 5/5 stars | 4.5/5 stars | 5/5 stars | |

=== Dance Recreation (episode: 5) ===
| Contestant | Mentor | Song | Film | Score | | | Round status |
| Contestant | Mentor | Song | Film | Vijay Antony | Saritha | Abhirami | Round status |
|---|---|---|---|---|---|---|---|
| Aiswarya Ragupathi | Balaji Thiyagarajan | Adiye Manam Nilluna | Neengal Kettavai | 5/5 stars | 5/5 stars | 5/5 stars | Golden Performance |
| Kiruthika | Saravana Vickram | Thillana Thillana | Muthu | 4/5 stars | 4.5/5 stars | 4/5 stars | |
| Aiswarya | Vasanth Vasi | Vaadi Vaadi Naattu Katta | Alli Thandha Vaanam | 4/5 stars | 5/5 stars | 4/5 stars | |
| Hemathi | Sabaris | Appadi Podu | Ghilli | 5/5 stars | 5/5 stars | 5/5 stars | Golden Performance |
| Jofna | Irfan | Adada Mazhaida | Paiyaa | 5/5 stars | 5/5 stars | 5/5 stars | Golden Performance |
| Agasthiya | Anser | Palakattu | Yaaradi Nee Mohini | 4.5/5 stars | 5/5 stars | 5/5 stars | |
| Kavipriya | Britto Mano | Vennilave | Minsara Kanavu | 4.5/5 stars | 5/5 stars | 5/5 stars | |
| Chandhini Kaur | Nagaraj | Kattipudi | Kushi | 0/5 stars | 0/5 stars | 0/5 stars | Not Telecasted |

=== One on One Battle: Live Performance Recreation (episode: 6) ===
| Battle | | | | Winners |
| Contestant | Mentor | Contestant | Mentor | Winners |
|---|---|---|---|---|
| Hemathi | Sabaris | Agasthiya | Anser | Agasthiya & Anser |
| Kavipriya | Britto Mano | Kiruthika | Saravana Vickram | Kiruthika &Saravana Vickram |
| Aiswarya Ragupathi | Balaji Thiyagarajan | Jofna | Irfan | Aiswarya Ragupathi, Balaji Thiyagarajan & Jofna, Irfan (Tie & 2 Winners) |
| Aiswarya | Vasanth Vasi | Chandhini Kaur | Nagaraj | Chandhini Kaur & Nagaraj |

=== Romantic Song Recreation (episode: 7) ===
| Contestant | Mentor | Song | Film | Score | | | Round status |
| Contestant | Mentor | Song | Film | Vijay Antony | Saritha | Abhirami | Round status |
|---|---|---|---|---|---|---|---|
| Aiswarya Ragupathi | Balaji Thiyagarajan | Sandakozhi | Aayutha Ezhuthu | 5/5 stars | 5/5 stars | 5/5 stars | Golden Performance |
| Kiruthika | Saravana Vickram | Kanmani Anbodu | Guna | 5/5 stars | 5/5 stars | 5/5 stars | Golden Performance |
| Aiswarya | Vasanth Vasi | Panju Mitta | Ettupatti Rasa | 5/5 stars | 5/5 stars | 5/5 stars | Golden Performance |
| Hemathi | Sabaris | Innum Konjam Naeram | Maryan | 5/5 stars | 5/5 stars | 5/5 stars | Golden Performance |
| Jofna | Irfan | Sara Sara Saara Kathu | Vaagai Sooda Vaa | 5/5 stars | 5/5 stars | 5/5 stars | Golden Performance |
| Agasthiya | Anser | Marugo Marugo | Sathi Leelavathi | 5/5 stars | 5/5 stars | 5/5 stars | Golden Performance |
| Kavipriya | Britto Mano | Uppu Karuvadu | Mudhalvan | 5/5 stars | 5/5 stars | 5/5 stars | Golden Performance |
| Chandhini Kaur | Nagaraj | Thamarai Poovukum | Pasumpon | 5/5 stars | 5/5 stars | 5/5 stars | Golden Performance |

=== Family Round [Part 1 & 2] (episode: 8 & 9) ===
| Contestant | Mentor | Contestant's Family Member(s) | Score | | | Round status | Episode # & Date |
| Contestant | Mentor | Contestant's Family Member(s) | Vijay Antony | Saritha | Abhirami | Round status | Episode # & Date |
|---|---|---|---|---|---|---|---|
| Aiswarya Ragupathi | Balaji Thiyagarajan | Aiswarya's Sister | 0/5 stars | 0/5 stars | 0/5 stars | | Episode 9 (24 November) |
| Kiruthika | Saravana Vickram | Kiruthika's Family Member | 5/5 stars | 5/5 stars | 5/5 stars | Golden Performance | Episode 8 (17 November) |
| Aiswarya | Vasanth Vasi | Aiswarya's Father | 0/5 stars | 0/5 stars | 0/5 stars | | Episode 8 (17 November) |
| Hemathi | Sabaris | Hemathi's mother | 5/5 stars | 5/5 stars | 5/5 stars | Golden Performance | Episode 9 (24 November) |
| Jofna | Irfan | Jofna's Mother | 5/5 stars | 5/5 stars | 5/5 stars | Golden Performance | Episode 8 (17 November) |
| Agasthiya | Anser | Baboos | 5/5 stars | 5/5 stars | 5/5 stars | Golden Performance | Episode 9 (24 November) |
| Kavipriya | Britto Mano | Child from Shelter | 5/5 stars | 5/5 stars | 5/5 stars | Golden Performance | Episode 9 (24 November) |
| Chandhini Kaur | Nagaraj | Chandhini's Father | 5/5 stars | 5/5 stars | 5/5 stars | Golden Performance | Episode 8 (17 November) |

=== Action Round (episode: 10) ===
| Teams | | Score | | | Round status |
| Contestant | Contestant | Vijay Antony | Saritha | Abhirami | Round status |
|---|---|---|---|---|---|
| Aiswarya | Chandhini Kaur | 5/5 stars | 5/5 stars | 5/5 stars | Golden Performance |
| Kavipriya | Kiruthika | 5/5 stars | 5/5 stars | 5/5 stars | Golden Performance |
| Agasthiya | Jofna | 5/5 stars | 5/5 stars | 5/5 stars | Golden Performance |
| Hemathi | Aiswarya Ragupathi | 5/5 stars | 5/5 stars | 5/5 stars | Golden Performance |

=== Devotional Round (episode: 11) ===
| Contestant | Mentor | Score | | | Round status |
| Contestant | Mentor | Vijay Antony | Saritha | Abhirami | Round status |
|---|---|---|---|---|---|
| Aiswarya Ragupathi | Balaji Thiyagarajan | 0/5 stars | 0/5 stars | 0/5 stars | |
| Kiruthika | Saravana Vickram | 0/5 stars | 0/5 stars | 0/5 stars | |
| Aiswarya | Vasanth Vasi | 0/5 stars | 0/5 stars | 0/5 stars | |
| Hemathi | Sabaris | 0/5 stars | 0/5 stars | 0/5 stars | |
| Jofna | Irfan | 0/5 stars | 0/5 stars | 0/5 stars | |
| Agasthiya | Anser | 0/5 stars | 0/5 stars | 0/5 stars | |
| Kavipriya | Britto Mano | 0/5 stars | 0/5 stars | 0/5 stars | |
| Chandhini Kaur | Nagaraj | 0/5 stars | 0/5 stars | 0/5 stars | |

== Golden Ticket ==
Contestants individually receive a Golden Ticket from judge if they complete best Performance for every episodes. The Golden Ticket can be safe zone for no Elimination.

| Contestants | Golden Tickets | Rounds |
|---|---|---|
| Jofna | | Iconic Recreation (Episode 3) |
| Aiswarya Ragupathi | | Movie Recreation (Episode 4) |
| Hemathi | | Dance Recreation (Episode 5), Romantic Song Recreation (Episode 7), Family Round (Episode 8/9) |
| Chandhini Kaur | | One on One Battle: Live Performance Round (Episode 6) |
| Kavipriya | | Action Round (Episode 10) |
| Kiruthika | | Action Round (Episode 10) |
