= Mahanadigai season 2 =

Mahanadigai
- Season 2
- Hosted by: RJ Vijay-
- Judges: Radikaa Sarathkumar; Swasika; Special Judges; Cheran (Epi:1 & 2); Ambika; Radha; Nikki Galrani; Sangeetha Krish
- No. of contestants: 8
- Winner: Gopika
- No. of episodes: 18

Release
- Original network: Zee Tamil
- Original release: 23 May – 13 September 2026

Season chronology
- ← Previous; Season 1 Next → Season 3

Mahanadigai season 2 is the second season of the Indian Tamil-language competition reality show Mahanadigai. The show is a competition wherein 8 talented young girls who are introduced as new heroines to the television industry by male television celebrities are paired up, and the couples compete against each other.

RJ Vijay has officially once again been appointed as the host for the second time. Judges for the season include actress Radikaa Sarathkumar, Swasika, director and actor Cheran was Special judge. It premiered on Zee Tamil on 23 May 2026, and airs every Saturday at 20:30 and streams digitally on ZEE5.

The Grand Finale of the show took place on 13 September 2026. Gopika was declared the title winners, while Kavya was declared the runners-up.

== Contestants ==
S. No.	Name	Home town	Entry episode	Episode exited
1	Ashwathi	Selam	Episode 1	18
2	Pitchaimani	Theni	Episode 1	
3	Suganthi Priya	Palani	Episode 1	18
4	Preethi	Madurai	Episode 1	
5	Kaviya	Coimbatore	Episode 2	18
6	Gopika	Tiruvallur	Episode 2	18
7	Nivedhikah	Sri Lanka	Episode 2	18
8	Aakarsha	Chennai	Episode 2	

== Mentors ==
- VJ Prathosh, a television actor and VJ. He played the supporting role in Raja Rani Season 2 serial which aired on Star Vijay.
- Rayan, an actor and model. He is known for portraying Arjun in Thamizhum Saraswathiyum which aired on Star Vijay. He is also known for his participation in the reality show Bigg Boss 8.
- Madhan Kumar, a YouTuber and actor. He is best known for his performances in Araathi YouTube series such as Murai Maman.
- Sabastin
- Sakthi
- Vignesh
- Thidiyan, a television actor.
- Muthukumaran Jegatheesan, a social media influencer and host. He is also known for his participation in the reality show Bigg Boss 8.

== Episodes ==
No. overall	No. in season	Title	Original release date	Duration
1	2	"Episode 1 & 2: The Grand Launch"	23 May 2026	115 minutes 107 minutes
2	2	"Episode 1 & 2: The Grand Launch"	24 May 2026	115 minutes 107 minutes
he show was launched with the introduction of Host, Judges, Contestants, Mentors. film director, film producer and screenwriter Vetrimaaran joined as the guest with Zee Tamil's actress.
3	2	"Episode 3: Introduction Round"	31 May 2026	131 minutes
Recreating a song from Tamil films. Aakarsha won first Star performer of the Week.
4	2	"Episode 3: Tentkotta Round"	14 June 2026	123 minutes
Tentkotta Round. Ashwathi won Star performer of the Week.

== Star of The Week ==
Week	Episodes	Airing	Round	Contestants
Week 3	3	31 May 2026	Introduction Round	Aakarsha
Week 4	4	14 June 2026	Tentkotta Round	Ashwathi

== Production ==
The second season of the show was announced 2 years after the first season ended. The auditions for the show were held in several locations in Tamil Nadu.

Radikaa Sarathkumar known for her films like Kizhakke Pogum Rail, Dharma Devathai, Neethikku Thandanai, and serials like as Chitti, Annamalai, Selvi, Arasi, Chellamay, Vani Rani. She will be joined by film director, producer, actor and lyricist Cheran known for his works in Tamil cinema Vetri Kodi Kattu (2000), Autograph (2004),Aadum Koothu and Thavamai Thavamirundhu (2005). As the second-time judge after Kalaignar TV's Naalaya Iyakkunar. Swasika joined as the third judge, best known for her permeance in Tamil cinema like Lubber Pandhu and Maaman. RJ Vijay has once again been appointed as the host for Zee Tamil's shows.
