= Sibbu Suryan =

Indian actor

- Born: 26 March 1990 (age 36); Shimoga, Karnataka, India
- Education: National Institute of Technology, Karnataka
- Occupation: Actor
- Years active: 2017–present
- Known for: Roja

Sibbu Suryan (born 26 March 1990), is an Indian television actor who predominantly works in Tamil and Kannada industry. He is best known for playing the lead role Arjun Prathap in Tamil soap opera Roja.

== Early life and career ==
Sibbu was born on 26 March 1990 in Shimoga, Karnataka to a Hindu Rajput family. He is a graduate from the National Institute of Technology, Karnataka.

He made his television debut through Kannada serial Radha Ramana which aired from 2017 to 2019. He became popular through his role of Arjun Prathap in Tamil serial Roja.

== Filmography ==
=== Television ===
Year	Show	Role	Language	Notes
2016	Milana	Akarsh	Kannada	
2017–2019	Radha Ramana	Adithya	Kannada	
2018–2022	Roja	Adv. Arjun Prathap	Tamil	
2023	Bharathi Kannamma 2	Bharathi	Tamil	
2024–2025	Ninnu Kori	Vikram	Telugu	
2025	Gettimelam	Vetri	Tamil	

==== Special appearances ====
Year	Show	Role	Notes
2019	Chandralekha	Adv. Arjun Prathap	
2019	Lakshmi Stores	Adv. Arjun Prathap	
2020	Poove Unakkaga	Adv. Arjun Prathap	
2020	Vanakkam Tamizha	Himself	
2021	Vanakkam Tamizha	Himself	
2021	Anbe Vaa	Adv. Arjun Prathap	
2021	Kannana Kanne	Adv. Arjun Prathap	
2022	Roja Rojadan	Himself	
2022	Magarasi	Adv. Arjun Prathap	
2024	Veera	Pandian	

== Awards ==
Year	Award	Category	Show	Notes
2019	Sun Kudumbam Viruthugal	Most popular TV actor award	Roja	Shared with Krishna
2019	Sun Kudumbam Viruthugal	Best couple award	Roja	Along with Priyanka Nalkari
2019	Galatta Nakshatra Awards	Debut actor of the year award	Roja	
2022	Sun Kudumbam Viruthugal	Most Favourite Hero award (Manam Kavarntha Naayagan)	Roja	
2022	Sun Kudumbam Viruthugal	Most Favourite Couple award	Roja	Along with Priyanka Nalkari
