= Bharathi Kannamma 2 =

- Genre: Romance; Drama
- Written by: Salachanthiran Rathinavel; Santhuru Thuraiyappa Dialogue by; Bharathi Thambi
- Screenplay by: V.K Amirtharaj
- Directed by: Praveen Bennett
- Starring: Vinusha Devi; Sibbu Suryan
- Theme music composer: Kiran
- Country of origin: India
- Original language: Tamil
- No. of seasons: 2
- No. of episodes: 133

Production
- Producers: Venkatesh Babu, Nabil .S
- Cinematography: Saravanan
- Editor: Viknesh Arjun
- Camera setup: Multi-camera
- Running time: approx.20-22 minutes per episode
- Production company: Global Villagers

Original release
- Network: Star Vijay
- Release: 6 February – 6 August 2023

Related
- Bharathi Kannamma

Bharathi Kannamma 2 is a 2023 Indian Tamil-language drama television series produced by Global Villagers and directed by Praveen Bennett. A spin-off series of Bharathi Kannamma, it stars Vinusha Devi and Sibbu Suryan along with Farina Azad, Roopa Sree and Deepa Shankar in supporting roles, whilst Reshma Muralidharan made a cameo appearance as Kannamma.

It premiered on Star Vijay on 6 February 2023 from Monday to Friday, and ended on 6 August 2023, and is also available on the digital platform on Disney+ Hotstar.

== Cast ==
=== Main ===
- Vinusha Devi as Chitra alias "Kannamma"
- Sibbu Suryan as Bharathi

=== Supporting ===
- Reshma Prasad as Madhu
- Roopa Sree as Soundarya
- Deepa Shankar as Bhagyalakshmi
- Radha as Sharmila
- Guhan Shanmugam as Vijay
- Udumalai Ravi as Selvam
- Baby George
- Anuradha Krishnamoorthy as N. Nandini
- Priyanka Dass / Sai Rithu as Anjali
- VJ Annamalai as Akilan
- Shathiga as Shanthi
- KMK Kailash As Dhandapaani
- Rajkumar Manoharan as Anbu

=== Special appearances ===
- Reshma Muralidharan as the real "Kannamma" (Dead)
  - Lisha Rajkumar as young Kannamma
- Samyutha as young Anjali
- Sherine Farhana as young Venba
- Sahasraa as young Madhu
- Aneesha as young Shanthi
- Sasilaya as a guest speaker in a drawing competition
- Diya Dharmaraj as a guest speaker in a drawing competition

== Production ==
The first promo was released on 3 February 2023.

=== Casting ===
The second season stars Vinusha Devi, who played Kannamma in the first season, was also play in the second season of this series. Sibbu Suryan, who was widely recognised for his good acting in Roja, was cast as Bharathi. Roopa Sree reprised her role as Bharathi's mother from Bharathi Kannamma marking her return to Tamil television.

=== Cancellation ===
Due to the serial not gaining as much traction as the previous season, the serial was brought to an abrupt end on 6 August 2023.
