= Sandhya Raagam (TV series) =

Indian Television serial

- Genre: Drama; Romance
- Written by: Dialogues; Nandhan Sridharan
- Screenplay by: K. R. Kanthan
- Directed by: N. Priyan (episodes 1-100); Bramma G Dev (episodes 1-10); Prathap Mani (episodes 100-350); Durga Saravanan (episodes 351-present)
- Starring: Sandhya Jagarlamudi; Antara Swarnakar; Bhavana Lasya; Rajeev Parameshwar; Manoj Prabhu; Guru Smaran
- Theme music composer: J. V. Sai Bharath
- Opening theme: Mazhaithuli Mannodu...
- Country of origin: India
- Original language: Tamil
- No. of episodes: 1034

Production
- Producer: S. Sabreesh Kumar
- Cinematography: Martin Jo; Gopal
- Editor: M. D. Prabhakaran; Lakshmi Murugesan; Srihari Dhaliath
- Camera setup: Multi-camera
- Running time: 22 minutes
- Production company: Monk Studios

Original release
- Network: Zee Tamil
- Release: 9 October 2023 – present

Sandhya Raagam is a 2023 Indian-Tamil language television series starring Sandhya Jagarlamudi, Antara Swarnakar and Bhavana Lasya, with Rajeev Parameshwar, Manoj Prabhu and Guru Smaran play supporting roles. It was directed by N. Priyan and produced by Sabreesh Kumar. The series shows the life of two sisters Janaki and Sandhya and their children. It is a remake of Hindi TV series Sapne Suhane Ladakpan Ke and an essence remake of Zee Telugu's Padamati Sandhya Raagam. It premiered on Zee Tamil from 9 October 2023. This series was launched along with Nala Damayanthi.

== Plot ==
The tale of "Sandhya Raagam" intricately weaves a tapestry of familial bonds, cultural clashes, and personal struggles, all set against the backdrop of love, loss, and redemption. At its core, the narrative revolves around the deep-seated affection shared between Janaki and Sandhiya, siblings raised in the warm embrace of a close-knit family in a quaint small town. Their idyllic existence is shattered when Janaki's marriage to Kishore is overshadowed by his subsequent elopement with Sandhya, sending shockwaves through the entire family.

Despite their abrupt departure to Houston, America, Sandhya persistently seeks to maintain a connection with Janaki, her efforts stymied by the disapproval of her rigid in-laws. Across the ocean, Kishore and Sandhiya find solace in each other's company, birthing a daughter, Maaya, whose upbringing straddles the cultural boundaries of her Indian heritage and American surroundings, her talent in Bharatnatyam a testament to her diverse upbringing.

Tragedy strikes the family when Sandhiya receives a devastating diagnosis of incurable cancer, prompting Janaki to bridge the chasm of estrangement and reunite with her ailing sister. In tandem, Janaki's own daughter, Dhanalakshmi, affectionately called Dhana, emerges as a pivotal figure, her burgeoning passion for badminton serving as a parallel narrative thread.

Yet, amidst their personal trials, Maaya finds herself grappling with the assimilation of her newfound family's traditions, inadvertently sparking discord with the Raguram family. Complicating matters further, Seenu, a member of the Raguram clan, gradually becomes enamored with Maaya, oblivious to her own conflicted emotions.

As Dhana's pursuit of badminton excellence unfolds, tensions escalate when she defies familial restrictions to participate in a crucial match, a decision that underscores the generational clash between tradition and individual ambition. The prelude to Seenu's impending nuptials to Charulatha, Parvathi's niece, becomes a battleground for simmering resentments and unspoken desires.

Charulatha and her family, harboring animosity towards Maaya, orchestrate disruptions during the pre-wedding festivities, exploiting every opportunity to cast her as an outsider. However, amidst the chaos, Janaki emerges as a steadfast ally, championing Dhana's athletic aspirations and ultimately fostering a sense of unity within the fractured family dynamic.

Raguram’s growing empathy for Maaya becomes a turning point. Raguram challenges prejudices and opens a chance, for healing. Maaya sees this shift. Charulatha’s family also sees its mistakes. Wants to rebuild ties. Charulatha’s family wants to reconnect. This shows how complex family bonds can be and how forgiveness matters.

In the tapestry of "Sandhya Raagam," each thread, whether woven with joy or sorrow, serves to illuminate the resilience of the human spirit, underscoring the timeless adage that love and understanding transcend even the most formidable barriers.

== Cast ==
=== Main ===
- Sandhya Jagarlamudi as Janaki Raghuram
  - Raghuram's wife; Dhanalakshmi's mother; Sandhya's estranged sister (2023–present)
- Antara Swarnakar as Maaya Srinivasan
  - Sandhya and Kishore's daughter; Janaki's niece; Dhanalakshmi's cousin; Seenu's love interest and turned wife (2023–present)
- VJ Thara (2023) / Bhavana Lasya (2023–present) as Dhanalakshmi Kathiravan
  - Raghuram and Janaki's daughter; Maaya and Seenu's cousin; Karthik's ex-fiancé; Kathir's wife (2023–24) / (2024–present)
- Rajeev Parameshwar as Raghuram
  - Ramaniyammal's elder son; Janaki's husband; Dhanalakshmi's father (2023–present)
- Surjith Kumar (2023–2025) / Manoj Prabhu (2025–present) as Srinivasan "Seenu"
  - Padma and Manivannan's son; Raghuram's nephew; Dhanalakshmi's cousin; Charu's ex-fiance; Maaya's husband
- Guru Smaran as Kathiravan
  - Sivaranjini's son; Raghuram's step-nephew; Dhanalakshmi's husband (2024–present)

=== Recurring ===
- Sheela (2023–2024) / P. R. Varalakshmi (2023) / Yuvasree (2024–present) as Ramaniyamal
  - Raghuram, Padma and Shivaram's mother; Kathiravan, Dhanalakshmi, Srinivasan and Appu's grandmother
- Sofia (2023–2024) / Reshma Reshu (2024–present) as Bhuvaneshwari: Raghuram's cousin and arch-rival
- Rajkamal / Sathya as Shivaram: Raghuram's younger brother; Parvathi's husband; Appu's father (2023–2026) / (2026–present)
- Arifa Arafat as Parvathi: Shivaram's wife; Appu's mother (2023–present)
- Subbulakshmi as Padma: Raghuram's younger sister; Manivannan's wife; Seenu's mother (2023–present)
- Vishwanth as Manivannan: Padma's husband; Seenu's father (2023–present)
- Thiyan Jackie as Appu: Shivaram and Parvathi's son (2023–present)
- Vinayak Shregar (2024) / Naveen K Thamizh (2024) / Ashwin Kannan (2024–present) as Karthick
  - A Badminton Coach and Trainer of Dhanalakshmi Dhana's ex-fiance who agrees to marry her under Bhuvaneshwari's plan
- Pranika Dhakshu as Charulatha: Seenu's ex-fiancee; Hari's love interest (2024–2025) (Dead)
- Issac Varkees as Pasupathy: Bhuvaneshwari's brother (2023–present)
- Anju as Sivaranjini: Raghuram, Padma and Shivaram's half-sister; Kathiravan's biological mother (2026–present)
  - Gayathri Sri as Young Sivaranjini: Raghuram, Padma and Shivaram's half-sister; Kathiravan's biological mother (2026)
- Rhema Ashok as Arundhathi (2025–present)
- Baboos Baburaj as Mahalingam: Charulatha’s father (2024–2025)
- Manush Manmohan as Kishore: Janaki's ex fiance; Sandhya's widower and Maaya's father (2023–present)
- Shankaresh Kumar as Prabhu: Pasupathy’s son (2023–2024)
- Siddarth Raj as Vasu (2026–present)

=== Special appearances ===
- Kaviya B as A friend of Dhanalakshmi (2023)
- Mohan Vaidya as Janaki and Sandhya's father, Ramaniyamal's brother (2023)
- Akshaya Rao as Sandhya: Maaya's mother; Kishore's wife, Janaki's estranged sister (2023)
- Vignesh as Father Anthony (2024)
- Merwen Balaji as Hari: Charu's love interest (2025)
- Raaghav as Muthuselvan IPS (2025)
- Vanitha Vijayakumar as Vasundhra Devi (2025)
- K. S. G. Venkatesh as Priest (2026)
- Shanthi Arvind as Herself (2026)
- Tejaswini Gowda as Ayali aka AD (2026)
- Suresh Krishnamurthi as Tiger Sivanandam (2026)
- Narasimha Raju as Rajamanickam: Raghuram, Padma, Shivaram and Sivaranjini's father; Kathiravan, Dhanalakshmi, Srinivasan and Appu's grandfather (2026)
- Vadivukkarasi as Rajanayagi (2026)

== Production ==
=== Casting ===
VJ Thara and newcomer Antara Swarnakar were cast to play lead roles of Dhanalakshmi and Maya. VJ Thara to act in this series, she left the series Anna. But later, she was replaced by Telugu actress Bhavana Lasya. Actress Sandhya Jagarlamudi was cast as Janaki, the sister of Sandhiya, marking his return after Sun TV's Chandralekha. Akshaya Rao was cast as Sandhiya in her television debut.

Rajeev Parameshwar, Manush and Rajkamal were cast in prominent roles. Surjith Kumar was cast as male lead, marking his return after Namma Veetu Ponnu. However, In February 2025, Surjith Kumar quit the show because her due some personal reason, and he was replaced by Manoj Prabhu.

=== Release ===
The first promo was released on 11 September 2023 featuring past story with elder sister's Janaki with her Family tell the story with song and revealing. The second promo was shot in foreign and unveiled on 17 September 2023, featuring Sister's meeting and revealing the release date. The third promo was unveiled on 25 September 2023, featuring Surjith Kumar, VJ Thara and Antara Swarnakar.

=== Promotion ===
Zee Tamil was promoted their new two fictions Nala Damayanthi and including this series by making advertisement with actress Ramya Krishnan and this promo released on 29 September 2023.

== Adaptations ==
Language	Title	Original release	Network(s)	Last aired	Notes
Hindi	Sapne Suhane Ladakpan Ke सपने सुहाने लडकपन के	21 May 2012	Zee TV	23 January 2015	Original
Marathi	Saara Kahi Tichyasathi सारं काही तिच्यासाठी	21 August 2023	Zee Marathi	14 September 2024	Remake
Tamil	Sandhya Raagam சந்தியா ராகம்	9 October 2023	Zee Tamil	Ongoing	Remake
