= Mahanadigai =

- Season 1 title card
- Genre: Reality show
- Presented by: RJ Vijay
- Judges: Season 1 Vijay Antony; Saritha; Abhirami Gopikumar; Season 2 Radikaa Sarathkumar; Cheran; Swasika
- Country of origin: India
- Original language: Tamil
- No. of seasons: 1
- No. of episodes: 18

Production
- Production location: Tamil Nadu
- Camera setup: Multi-camera
- Running time: approx. 50–60 minutes per episode

Original release
- Network: Zee Tamil
- Release: 5 October 2024 – present

Related
- Kadhanayagi

Mahanadigai is a 2024 Indian Tamil-language reality competition television show that airs on Zee Tamil and streamed on ZEE5. This show is an acting competition for young artists between the ages of 18 and 30, providing a platform for young female talents and introducing new heroines to the industry and a future Zee Tamil serial.

The first season premiered on 5 October 2024, and ended on 2 February 2025 with 18 episodes. RJ Vijay was the host of the show, which was judged by actress Saritha, Abhirami Gopikumar, actor and music director Vijay Antony. The show's final episode aired on 2 February 2025; the season winner is Hemathi.

The season premiered on 23 May 2026 every Saturday at 20:30. RJ Vijay has officially once again been appointed as the host for the second time. Judges for the season include actress Radikaa Sarathkumar, Swasika, director and actor Cheran.

== Series overview ==
Season	Episodes	Original Broadcast		Winner	Aried
Season	Episodes	First Aired	Last Aired	Winner	Aried
1	18	5 October 2024	2 February 2025	Hemathi	Sunday @ 20:30
2	TBA	23 May 2026	present	TBA	Sunday @ 20:30

== Season 1 ==
The first season of Mahanadigai was aired on every Sunday at 20:30 from 5 October 2024 to 2 February 2025 and ended with 18 Episodes. Vijay Antony, Saritha and Abhirami Gopikumar as the judges, television host RJ Vijay as the host. The winner of the season was Hemathi and Aiswarya Ragupathi was the runner-up.

Prize Winners:

- Title Winner of Mahanadigai: Hemathi
- First Runners-Up: Jofna Alice

== Contestants ==
S. No.	Name	Home town	Entry episode	Episode exited	Status
1	Kiruthika Swaminathan	Thanjavur	Episode 1	Episode 18	Finalist
2	Chandhini Kaur	Malaysia	Episode 1	Episode 18	Finalist
3	Kavipriya	Sri Lanka	Episode 1		
4	Aiswarya	Erode	Episode 1		
5	Hemathi	Salem	Episode 2	Episode 18	Winner
6	Aiswarya Ragupathi	Thoothukudi	Episode 2	Episode 18	
7	Jofna Alice	Coimbatore	Episode 2		Runner Up
8	Agasthiya	Viluppuram	Episode 2	Episode 18	Finalist

== Mentors ==
- Britto Mano, a television actor. He played the main role in Thavamai thavamirundhu serial which aired on Zee Tamil.
- Mohammed Ansar, a Tamil anchor and comedian.
- Vimal, a television actor. He is best known for his role as Karikalan in the television series Ethirneechal.
- Vasanth Vasi, a television actor. He is mainly known for his role of Oru Oorla Oru Rajakumari and Agni Natchathiram.
- Balaji Thiyagarajan Dayalan, an actor, who works predominantly in Tamil cinema and a television series. He is best known for his performances in series such as Raja Rani 2.
- Saravana Vickram a television actor. He is known for portraying Kannan in Pandian Stores which aired on Star Vijay. He is also known for his participation in the reality show Bigg Boss 7.
- Viraat a television actor who mainly works in the Kannada and Tamil languages. He is mainly known for his lead role in the serials Perazhagi and Anbe Vaa.
- Irfan an actor, who has appeared in Tamil films and television serials. He is known for his roles as Vineeth in Kana Kaanum Kaalangal and as Shakthi Saravanan in Saravannan Meenatchi 2 which aired on Star Vijay.

== Season 2 ==
Mahanadigai Season 2, the second season of Super Singer Junior, premiered on Zee Tamil from 23 May 2026, with the first episodes telecasting Saturdays and Sundays at 20:30 PM IST, then moved to every Sunday. The host of this show is RJ Vijay. And the judging panel consists of three judges: Radikaa Sarathkumar, Swasika, director and actor Cheran.

== Production ==
In early August 2024, the show was announced by Zee Tamil. It will provide emerging young talent from across Tamil Nadu an opportunity to showcase their talent and gain recognition in the Tamil entertainment industry.

=== Season 1 ===
Actress Saritha, celebrated for her outstanding performances in South Indian cinema, known for her films like Kalyana Agathigal, Julie Ganapathi, Maaveeran. She will be joined by Tamil music director Vijay Antony who was cast as the first-time judge, along with the popular actress Abhirami Gopikumar, known for her films like Virumaandi. RJ Vijay has officially once again been appointed as the host for Zee Tamil's shows.

== See also ==
- Kadhanayagi
