= Anbe Vaa (2020 TV series) =

Indian Tamil-language soap opera

- Genre: Soap opera
- Screenplay by: Rajashri N Roy / Sezhklar
- Directed by: Prince Emmanuel (1-30); P. Selvam (31-150); Salem Siva MP (151-292); Narayana Moorthy (293-625); Rajendran (626-797); Sai Marudhu (798-904); Manibharathy (905-1037); Justin Raj (1038-1102)
- Starring: Delna Davis; Viraat; Shreegopika Neelanath
- Theme music composer: Kiran
- Opening theme: "Naan Paarthathilae"
- Composer: Kiran
- Country of origin: India
- Original language: Tamil
- No. of seasons: 2
- No. of episodes: 1102

Production
- Producer: Saregama productions
- Camera setup: Multi-camera
- Running time: approx. 20-22 minutes per episode
- Production company: Saregama

Original release
- Network: Sun TV
- Release: 2 November 2020 – 28 April 2024

Anbe Vaa (transl. Come My Dear) is a 2020 Indian Tamil language soap opera on Sun TV. It was premiered on 2 November 2020 from Monday to Sunday and ended on 28 April 2024 and has been successfully running for 4 years and was replaced by Malli serial. The show stars Delna Davis, Viraat and Shreegopika Neelanath It is also available on the digital platform Sun NXT. This series was launched along with Kannana Kanne.

== Plot ==
=== Episode 1-920 ===
Bhoomika, a responsible and compassionate young woman, is devoted to taking care of her mother Annalakshmi and two younger sisters Deepika and Karthika. Her selflessness and dedication have made her the backbone of her family. Varun, on the other hand, is the son of Manoj Krishna a wealthy industrialist who leads a carefree life filled with luxuries and pleasures.

Their paths cross in an unexpected encounter, and their first impression of each other is far from positive. Bhoomika sees Varun as a spoiled and insensitive person, while Varun views Bhoomika as a boring and unsophisticated girl.

Despite their initial differences, fate brings them together again, and this time they start to see each other in a new light. They realize that there is more to each other than meets the eye and soon fall deeply in love. Despite the opposition from Manoj Krishna's family and their societal differences, they decide to get married.

Their marriage marks the beginning of a life-changing journey filled with challenges and obstacles. Bhoomika struggles to adjust to Varun's affluent lifestyle, and Varun tries to understand Bhoomika's sacrifices and struggles to make ends meet. However, their love for each other keeps them going, and they strive to make their marriage work.

As they navigate their way through their differences, they face various challenges that test their love and commitment to each other. They must deal with family conflicts, financial struggles, and societal pressures while trying to maintain their relationship.

=== Episode 921 - 1102 ===
Bhoomika and Jenifer alias Jenny was killed by Vasuki. Now the story explores how Varun is living with his new wife Kanmani and his adoptive son Pappu. Varun initially disliked kanmani as she was overweight as compared to bhoomika. However varun had to adjust as his old wife is dead. Later, Varun suspects Kanmani of Bhoomika's murder and kicks her out of the house, and gets close with Vasuki. However Kanmani proves her innocence and is reunited with Varun.

== Cast ==
=== Main cast ===
- Delna Davis as:
  - Bhoomika – Rajasekar and Annalakshmi's eldest daughter; Varun's first wife; Pappu's adoptive mother (2020–2023; deceased)
    - Aneesha as young Bhoomika
  - Nancy – Jenny's sister; Deepak's wife; Pappu's mother (2023; deceased)
- Viraat as Varun Krishna (VK Krishna) – Manoj Krishna and Parvathi's son; Vasuki's brother; Bhoomika's first husband and later Kanmani's husband; Pappu's adoptive father (2020–2024)
  - Vaibhav as young Varun
- Shreegopika Neelanath as Kanmani – Kalyanaraman's daughter; Varun's second wife (2023–2024)

=== Recurring cast ===
- Pooja Fiya / Mahalakshmi Shankar as Vasuki – Manoj Krishna and Parvathi's daughter; Varun's sister; Madhavan's wife; the main antagonist
- Kanya Bharathi as Parvathi – Manoj Krishna's wife; Vasuki and Varun's mother
- Master Rowan as Bharath (Pappu) – Deepak and Nancy's son; Varun and Bhoomika's adopted son
- J. Durai Raj as Madhavan – Eshwari's son; Neelaveni's brother; Vasuki's husband
- Senthilnathan as Kalyanaraman – Kanmani's father
- Anand as Manoj Krishna – Saraswathi's son; Manjula's brother; Parvathi's husband; Vasuki and Varun's father
- Sujatha Selvaraj as Eshwari – Madhavan and Neelaveni's mother
- Queency Stanly as Neelaveni – Eshwari's daughter; Madhavan's sister
- Birla Bose as Rajasekar – Annalakshmi's former husband; Vandana's husband; Bhoomika, Karthika, Deepika and Vishwa's father
- Vinaya Prasad as Annalakshmi – Rajasekar's former wife; Bhoomika, Karthika and Deepika's mother
- Ashaera / Preetha Suresh / Kokila Gopal as Karthika – Rajasekar and Annalakshmi's second daughter; Bhoomika and Deepika's sister; Vishwa's half-sister; Vandana's stepdaughter; Adithya's love interest
- Akshitha Ashok / Sushmitha Suresh as Deepika – Rajasekar and Annalakshmi's youngest daughter; Bhoomika and Karthika's sister; Vishwa's half-sister; Vandana's stepdaughter
- Reshma Pasupuleti / Vinodhini as Vandana – Anjali's sister; Rajasekar's second wife; Vishwa's mother; Bhoomika, Karthika and Deepika's stepmother

=== Other cast ===
- Guhan Shanmugam as Ganesh (Ganesha) – Kanmani's obsessive lover
- Arun Kumar Rajan as Dr. Deepak – Nancy's widower; Pappu's father
- Swathi Thara as Jennifer (Jenny) – Nancy's sister (deceased)
- Sai Ashwin as Rahul – Varun's nephew
- Baby Riya as Aishwarya – Varun's niece
- Kausalya Senthamarai / Geetha / Rajyalakshmi as Saraswathi – Manoj Krishna and Manjula's mother; Vasuki and Varun's grandmother
- Ramya Srinivasan as Swetha – Ravi's wife
- Mohammed Salmaan as Ravi – Varun and Bhoomika's helper; Swetha's husband
- Mercy Leyal as Manjula – Saraswathi's daughter; Manoj Krishna's sister; Sampath's wife; Janhvi's mother
- Sherin Jaanu as Janhvi – Manjula and Sampath's daughter; Vasuki and Varun's cousin
- Sai Gopi as Sampath – Manjula's husband; Janhvi's father
- Sankavi Rajendran as Reshma – a television news reporter
- Egavalli as Jayanthi – Vasuki's friend
- Harish G as Chandru – Jayanthi's husband
- VJ Dhanusek Vijayakumar as Jyothi (Joe) – Jenny's friend
- Sofiya Victor as Kavitha – Bhoomika's junior
- Rekha Angelina as Indra – Kavitha's mother
- Monabethu as Lawyer Tamizharasi
- Bharathi Mohan as Aarumugam – Varun's business partner who later becomes his rival
- Subbulakshmi Rangan / Swathi Meenakshi as Shilpa
- Swathi as Preethi – Shilpa's sidekick
- Sangeetha Sai as Anjali – Vandana's sister
- Sabari as Rakesh
- Rani as ACP Chandrakantha – an assistant commissioner of police
- Krishna Kumar as ACP Raman – Shyam's cousin
- Bhuvana as SI Meena – a sub-inspector of police
- Pandi Kamal as Adithya – Aishwarya's brother; Varun and Bhoomika's best friend; Karthika's love interest
- Akshara as Aishwarya – Adithya's sister
- Y. G. Mahendran as Colonel Ram
- Anuradha Krishnamoorthi as Seetha – Colonel Ram's wife
- Neepa Vaman as Gomathi
- Vishwanth as Brahmanandam
- Giri Dwarakish as Adiapaatham (Aadi) – Varun's personal assistant
- Hemadayal as Ashwini – Bhoomika's best friend
- S. D. Ganesh as Ashok – Varun's best friend
- Vicky Vignesh as Shyam – Swetha's former fiancé (deceased)

=== Special appearances ===
- Akshaya Praba as herself (2021)
- Komalam Charuhasan as herself (2021)
- Nimeshika Radhakrishnan as Meera (2021)
- Nithya Das as Yamuna (2021)
- Rahul Ravi as Yuva (2021)
- Priyanka Nalkari as Roja Arjun (2021)
- Sibbu Suryan as Arjun Prathap (2021)
- Gayatri Shastry as Kalpana Prathap (2021)
- Keerthana as Arulvakhu Vedhavalli (2021)
- Raaghav as Rahul (2021)
- Preetha as Baby (2021)
- Shwetha Bandekar as Chandra (2021)
- Ambika as Chairman Janaki (2021)
- Aarthi as herself (2021)
- Ganeshkar as himself (2021)
- K. R. Vijaya as Ulganayagi (2021)
- Suja Varunee as herself (2021)
- Charu Hasan as himself (2021)
- Anuradha as Visalatchi (2022)

== Production ==
=== Casting ===
Viraat was cast in the male lead role as Varun Krishna after his role as Prithvi in Colors Tamil`s Perazhagi, while Malayalam actress Delna Davis was cast as the female lead role as Boomika Varun and Nancy Deepak, but in November 2023 she quit the series. Anand was cast as Manoj Krishna, and makes his comeback to Tamil Television after eight years. Kanya Bharathi was cast as Parvathi Manoj Krishna.

Vinaya Prasad was cast as Bhoomika Karthika and Deepika's mother make her Tamil Television debut. Reshma Pasupuleti was selected to portray the role of Vandana Rajasekar (Boomika Karthika and Deepika's step-mother) who played a negative role, but in August 2021 she quit the series. Vinodhini was cast to play the role of Vandana Rajasekar. In March 2023, Arun Kumar Rajan was cast as Dr. Deepak. In September 2023, Shree Gopika Neelanath was cast as Kanmani.

== Soundtrack ==
Track list
No.	Title	Singer(s)	Length
1.	"Naan Paarthathilae நான் பார்த்ததிலே"	Haricharan	2:22
