= Kaalabairavan =

Tamil soap opera television series

- காலபைரவன்
- Genre: Soap opera
- Written by: Rajiv Priyan
- Directed by: Rajiv Priyan
- Starring: Sanghavi; Ragavan; Roopa Sree
- Country of origin: India
- Original language: Tamil
- No. of seasons: 1
- No. of episodes: 177

Production
- Producer: K.A.K Asath
- Camera setup: Multi-camera
- Running time: approx. 20-22 minutes per episode (Monday - Friday 6:30PM)
- Production company: Jesm's Creations

Original release
- Network: Jaya TV
- Release: 9 December 2013 – 25 August 2014

Kaalabairavan (Tamil: காலபைரவன்) is an Indian Tamil-language soap opera that aired Monday through Friday on Jaya TV from 9 December 2013 to 25 August 2014 6:30PM IST for 177 episodes. The show starred Sanghavi, Ragavan and Roopa Sree among others. It was written and directed by Rajiv Priyan.
