= Nala Damayanthi (TV series) =

Tamil language Television series

- Genre: Romance; Drama
- Directed by: Prathap Mani
- Starring: Priyanka Nalkari; Nandha
- Theme music composer: M.R
- Country of origin: India
- Original language: Tamil
- No. of episodes: 196

Production
- Producer: Nirmala
- Camera setup: Multi-camera
- Running time: 22 minutes

Original release
- Network: Zee Tamil
- Release: 9 October 2023 – 25 May 2024

Related
- Zindagi Ki Mehek

Nala Damayanthi is an Indian-Tamil language television series starring Priyanka Nalkari and Nandha. The show revolves around Dhamayanthi, a small-town girl who falls in love with a city rich boy Nalan. It premiered on Zee Tamil from 9 October 2023 and ended on 25 May 2024 with 196 Episodes. This series was launched along with Sandhya Raagam.

== Cast ==
=== Main ===
- Priyanka Nalkari as Damayanthi (Dead)
- Nandha as Nalan
- Sreenithi as Anjali (2024)

=== Recurring ===
- Vinodhini Vaidyanathan as Annapurani: Dhamayanthi's mother.
- Ravi Shankar as Ramprasad: Nalan’s father
- Sabitha Anand as Parvathy
- Ashwanth Thilak as AGR
- Priya as Nayaki
- Mohan Vaidya
- Tharun Appasamy as Varun: Damayanti's younger brother and Preeti's love interest
- Prabhakaran as Aadhavan
- Sandhya Dhaiyan as Preeti: Nalan's younger sister and Varun's love interest

=== Guest appearances ===
- Riya Vishwanathan as Riya (Episode: 1)
- Sivakumar as Aiya (Episode: 1)

== Production ==
=== Casting ===
Priyanka Nalkari was cast as the female lead Damayanthi. In May 2024 actress Sreenidhi was introduced as a new female lead, Anjali, for a new story line with Nalan. Nandha was cast as the male lead Nalan. He had previously been a cast member on Kanne Kalaimaane, which he left in order to film Nala Damayanthi. In January 2024, actor Puvi Arasu was cast as Kamesh.

=== Release ===
The first promo was released on 13 September 2023, featuring Priyanka Nalkari and revealing the title name. The second promo was unveiled on 24 September 2023, featuring Nandha revealing story. The third promo was unveiled on 28 September 2023, featuring protagonist Nalkari, Nandha and Ramya Krishnan and revealing the release date. The show started airing on Zee Tamil on 9 October 2023, replacing Peranbu time slot.

=== Promotion ===
Zee Tamil was promoted their new two fictions Sandhya Raagam and including this series by making advertisement with Krishnan as God Amman and this promo released on 28 September 2023.

== Reception ==
The show got a TVR of 3.09 on launching week on 9 October 2023.
