= Veera (Tamil TV series) =

2024 Indian Tamil language TV series

- Genre: Drama; Revenge
- Screenplay by: Raghul Kannapiran; Dialogue; K.V. Pandiyan
- Directed by: Siva Sekar
- Starring: Vaishnavi Arulmozhi; Arun Muthusamy
- Country of origin: India
- Original language: Tamil
- No. of episodes: 765

Production
- Producer: Arun Ira
- Cinematography: K.C. Ramesh
- Camera setup: Multi-camera
- Running time: 22 minutes
- Production company: Sapphire Blue Production

Original release
- Network: Zee Tamil
- Release: 26 February 2024 – 20 September 2026

Veera is a 2024 Indian Tamil language revenge drama television series starring Vaishnavi Arulmozhi and Arun Crizer in the leads with Subiksha Kayarohanam, Oorvambu Lakshmi, Pasanga Sivakumar, Sibbu Suryan and Siddarth Raj. It is aired on Zee Tamil from 26 February 2024 and ended on 20 September 2026. The series is directed by Siva Sekar under the banner of Sapphire Blue Production.

== Synopsis ==
Veera is a young girl who lives with her mother, two sisters and brother. The family revolves around Pandiyan, who, along with his mother, defends Veera's childish antics. Maaran drinks alcohol and spends half his time roaming around town, much to his father's disapproval. His aunt is the only one that offers some support to him, along with his brothers.

When Pandiyan dies in a road collision caused by Maaran, the tale of events that cause both Veera and Maaran to marry, whilst her older sister Kanmani looks for revenge against Maaran form the premise of the story.

Veera found out the truth about Maaran did not cause Pandian's accident, that is Raghavan did. So, Veera falls in love with him.

Brinda later found out that Maaran did not cause Pandian's accident, rather Raghavan did and therefore begins to respect him. Still, Kanmani looks for revenge against Maaran without knowing the truth about Pandian's accident.

Kanmani found out the truth about Maaran did not cause Pandian's accident, that is Raghavan and she then understood how Veera loves Maaran and Brinda respects him.

Kanmani feels sorry for him and asks for Maaran's forgiveness. So, her revenge is canceled and she starts supporting him and all are now aware that Maaran is a kindhearted, innocent and hero, except his father Ramachandran.

They try to convince Kanmani to come home and live with Raghavan. But she refused until Maaran convinced her.

But for the first time, Kanmani avoids and ignores Raghavan just like Veera avoids Maaran. But Kanmani still respected and supported him. Finally, Ramachandran finds out the truth about Pandian's accident that is not Maaran, it is Raghavan did. They arrested Raghavan and Ramachandran is very heartbroken and realises that Maaran is a good person and feels sorry for him. Kanmani tries to convince Ramachandran to forgive Raghavan because it was an accident and when she was guilty, ashamed she tells the whole truth about her revenge. Not only that, she tries to tell Ramachandran to understand Maaran and he asks for forgiveness.

His father forgives Maaran and Raghavan. But actually, Viji killed her brother Pandian not Raghavan. They all become aware of that and Kanmani later loves Raghavan, with everyone becoming happy.

The story to be continued

== Cast ==
=== Main ===
- Vaishnavi Arulmozhi as Veeralakshmi alias Veera: An auto driver turned IAS, Maaran's wife
- Arun Muthusamy as Vetrimaaran alias Maaran: Veera's husband
  - Rehan as young Maaran

=== Recurring ===
- Subiksha Kayarohanam as Kanmani: Ragavan's wife (Dead)
- Baby Safa as Kanimozhi: Ragavan & Kanmani's daughter
- Pasanga Sivakumar as Ramachandran: Kaveri Textiles owner, Kaveri's widower
- Oorvambu Lakshmi as Valliammal: an unmarried woman, Ramachandran's younger sister
- Siddarth Raj as Ragavan: Kanmani's widower, Kanimozhi's father,Rani Alias Pushpa husband & Ramachandran and Kaveri's first son
- Anandi Ajay / Salma Arun as Rani Alias Pushpa: Ragavan's second wife (Antagonist turned protagonist)
- Naveen Prince as Karthik: Brindha's husband, Ramachandran and Kaveri's second son
- Sowndariya Balu / Hasin as Brindha: Karthik's first wife
- Sankavi Rajendran as Viji: Ramachandran and Valli's relative. Karthik's ex-wife, But as a fake marriage (Antagonist)(Dead)
- Pranika Dhakshu as Madhu: Maaran's college mate and one-side love interest (Dead)
- Poojitha Gowda as Malarvizhi alias malar: Veera's Personal Assistant (PA) & Suriya's wife
- Saravana Rajavel as Kathi: Maaran's friend
- Sudha Pushpa as Muthulakshmi: Pandiyan, Kanmani, Veera & Brindha's mother
- Chandru as Suriya: Maaran's rival turned protagonist & Malarvizhi's husband
  - Kaif as young Suriya
- Singaraja as Suriya's father
- Lokesh Baskaran as Adithya: Maaran & Veera's rival
- Agaramuthalvan as Siddharth: Adithya's son

=== Cameo ===
- Sibbu Suryan as Pandiyan: Muthulakshmi's son
- VJ Mohana as Rosy: Pandiyan Lover
- Niharika Harshu as Kaveri: Ramachandran's wife
- Balaji Thiyagarajan Dayalan as Rajesh: Kanmani's ex-lover
- Geetha Saraswathi as Rajesh's mother
- Sasindhar Pushpalingam as Aravind: Veera's ex-fiancé
- Prajin as Raja
- Vadivukkarasi as Kokila
- Arnav Amjath as Saravana Velu
- R. Pandiarajan as The Judge
- Ram G as Arivazhagan: Pandian, Kanmani, Veera & Brindha's cousin
- Sinthujaa Jatheshwaran as Chandra: Suriya's Ex-lover
- Jay Srinivas as Cibi
- Naveen Muralidhar as Fake preacher (Thief)
- KPY Yogi as Fake preacher(Thief)
- Anand Selvan as Shiva IPS: Maaran's friend
- Santhana Bharathi
- Shreekumar as Vetrivel
- Ajay Rathnam as judge

== Production ==
=== Development ===
Initially, the title of the serial was set to be 'Sivamurugan Textiles'. Due to undisclosed reasons, the first promo was released with a new name 'Veera' on 8 February 2024.

=== Casting ===
Vaishnavi Arulmozhi was cast as Veera, marking her return after Peranbu. Arun Crizer was cast as the male lead role, marking his return after Rajini. Sibbu Suryan was cast as in a cameo role.

On 17 May 2024, Santhana Bharathi was brought in for special appearances. On 7 August 2024, Prajin was cast in special appearance as Raja. On 13 February 2025, R. Pandiarajan was cast in special appearance as Judge.

=== Release ===
The show began airing on Zee Tamil on 26 February 2024 from Monday to Friday, replacing Maari.

=== Reception ===
The show got a TVR of 3.69 on launching week on 26 February 2024. In July 2024, the series was the third most watched serial in Zee Tamil with 4.11 TVR.
