= Gettimelam =

2025 Indian Tamil TV series

- Genre: Psychological thriller Romance Crime Drama Action
- Based on: Lakshmi Nivasa
- Written by: Dialogues; K.V. Pandiyan
- Screenplay by: Mahesh Rao
- Directed by: Ravi Pasappanathotti; Lokesh; Ranganath; Rajan Mariyappan; Bharathi Raja P
- Starring: Chaya Singh; Shreekumar; Viraat; Soundarya Reddy
- Country of origin: India
- Original language: Tamil
- No. of episodes: 442

Production
- Executive producer: Harish kumar Sakthivel
- Producers: Krithika M Rao; Prakash Agar
- Production location: Karnataka
- Cinematography: Madhan; Punith Pandihalli; Raagu Kiyarhalli; Sanju Mandiya
- Camera setup: Multi-Camera
- Running time: 22 minutes
- Production company: Keerthi Akshaya Network (Karnataka)

Original release
- Network: Zee Tamil
- Release: 20 January 2025 – 28 June 2026

Gettimelam (transl. Wedding drumrolls) is an Indian Tamil Psychological thriller television drama that airs on Zee Tamil from 20 January 2025 and ended on 28 June 2026. The series stars Chaya Singh, Shreekumar, Viraat and Soundarya Reddy. It is an official remake of Zee Kannada's TV series Lakshmi Nivasa. The screenplay and direction were handled by Mahesh Rao, an Indian director and screenplay writer in Kannada industry. It was launched along with Manasellam series.

The synopsis is about Sivaraman and Lakshmi, vows to build a new big house but their children have different plans. Thus the couple makes the fulfilment to their children and keeping their family together.

== Plot ==
Sivaraman and Lakshmi have Five children. Three sons - Balamurugan, Raghuvaran and Kesavan, where Balamurugan is adopted son and two daughters - Thulasi and Anjali. Each has their own desires, dreams, and personality. The eldest son, Raghuvaran is stingy with his quick temper, quick wit, and stinginess. He always thinks only of his wife Kavitha and his son Vinay. He has no thought of helping the family or being a good son. Kesavan, who falls in love with Deepa from a rich background family, and married against her family. He also refuses to take responsibility for the house. Both their sons, has no thought of helping the family and keeps everything for themself. But Balamurugan, Thulasi and Anjali help the family in all the circumstances and make the house with full of happiness.

Lakshmi is anxious that Thulasi is still not married despite being over thirty due to her horoscope defect. Thulasi works in the company under the control of the head Srikanth. Srikanth is a widower and has a child Diya. Diya get attached with Thulasi and it creates a beautiful bond between them. Seeing Thulasi and Diya together in the office, Srikanth's mother Rajeshwari sends a message to Thulasi family that it would have been better if Thulasi had been the mother of her granddaughter Diya. Thulasi's family tells them about her horoscope defect but Srikanth and Rajeshwari didn't believe in it and they accept Thulasi and fixed the marriage date. Unfortunately on the day of the wedding, Thulasi's family and others waiting for Srikanth's arrival but the car in which Srikanth, Rajeshwari and Diya were travelling gets into an accident. Srikanth died in the accident but Diya is survived and Rajeshwari was in the serious condition at hospital. Before Rajeshwari's death, she tells to Thulasi that she wants to take care and accept Diya as her daughter so Thulasi agreed with her. Sivaraman and Lakshmi become worried a lot about Srikanth death and Thulasi's life. Srikanth's sister and her husband refuse to allow Diya to go with Thulasi but Diya calls Thulasi as her mother and wants to go with her. After so much obstacles Diya went to Thulasi's house. Srikanth's lawyer wants Thulasi to maintain full ownership of the property until Srikanth's daughter turns eighteen.

Meanwhile, Vetrivel "Vetri" Eeswaramoorthy, the younger brother of Deepa (Kesavan's wife) is a young politician. He fell in love with Thulasi at first sight and tried to win her over for marriage. Although he was initially engaged to Divya, the daughter of a politician, he secretly tied the mangalsutra around Thulasi's neck without her knowledge. Eventually, the truth came to light, and after overcoming many obstacles, Thulasi chose to live with Vetri for the sake of her family's happiness. But later, Thulasi realized Vetri's true good nature and gradually began to develop feelings for him.

On the other hand, Anjali is studying in college and her best friend Kavin loves her. Kavin is none other than Lakshmi's elder brother Varadharajan's son. Kavin is unable to profess his love to Anjali because for the fear of losing their friendship. Mahesh, an orphan and a rich man visits Anjali's college as a chief guest and falls in love with Anjali at the first sight. With the permission of Anjali and her family, Mahesh married Anjali. After the marriage, Mahesh true face were revealed. His anger always manifests as an alter ego. Mahesh has a Psychological disorder that his closest person should not let him alone and not give attention to someone / other person. So he wants Anjali to give first priority to him and also if someone who teases or talks to Anjali rather than her family members, he become enraged and beats them in arrogant way. So his caring towards Anjali turns into psycho behavior. Anjali still does not know about Mahesh's real face, as he wearing a mask of a kind husband and good person to the society.

Balamurugan "Murugan", the adopted son of Lakshmi and Sivaraman, is a bubbly and loving man, who is both deaf and unable to speak since his childhood. The couple has raised him as their own and eldest son. He is loved by all the family members, except Raghuvaran. Murugan's real name is Arjunan and he is the childhood best friend of Mahesh. Murugan is closely connected to Mahesh's mysterious past. Murugan is unaware that Mahesh is his childhood best friend. Murugan was separated from his mother Sivagami, whom he is searching for. Sivagami is also Lakshmi's childhood friend. He works in a small shop in outside of the temple. Murugan fell in love with Revathy, a flower seller near the temple. Revathy is living with her mother Bhuvana, who is blind. Revathy also developed feelings for Murugan. After some comical and serious moments, they confessed their love to each other and got married.

The story track is focusing on Lakshmi - Sivaraman's dream house, Thulasi - Vetri's marriage life and Mahesh - Murugan's mysterious past story.

== Cast ==
=== Main ===
- Chaya Singh as Thulasi Vetrivel – Lakshmi and Sivaraman's first daughter.
- Sibbu Suryan (Jan.2025 - Oct.2025) / Shreekumar (Oct.2025 - Jun.2026) as Vetrivel "Vetri", a politician – Eshwaramoorthy and Abhirami's younger son.
- Viraat as Mahesh Chandran "Mahesh", a business man, Psychopath and Rakesh Chandran (Mahesh's Twin Brother)
- Soundarya Reddy as Anjali Mahesh Chandran – Lakshmi and Sivaraman's second daughter.

=== Supporting ===
- Praveena (Jan.2025 - Feb.2026) / Nithya Ravindar (Feb.2026 - Jun.2026) as Lakshmi Sivaraman – Sivaraman's wife.
- Ponvannan (Jan.2025 - Aug.2025) / G.Sivan Srinivasan (Jan.2026 - Jun.2026) as Sivaraman – Lakshmi's husband.
- Sillilalli Anand as Balamurugan "Murugan" aka Arjunan – Mahesh's childhood best friend.
- Cherika (Ashwini) R. Murthy as Revathy Balamurugan aka Revathy Arjunan, a florist - Murugan's love interest turned wife.
- Madhan Pandian as Sathiya, a mechanic, Sivaraman's trainee.
- Vandana Michael as Meenakshi Kathirvel aka Meena – Eshwaramoorthy and Abhirami's first daughter-in-law.
- Premalatha as Abhirami – Vetri, Kathir and Deepa's mother.
- L. Raja as Eshwaramoorthy – Vetri, Kathir and Deepa's father.
- Nathan Shyam as Kathirvel "Kathir" – Eshwaramoorthy and Abhirami's elder son.
- J.Lalitha as Vetri, Kathir and Deepa's grandmother.
- Padmini Chandrasekar as Sivagami - Murugan (Arjunan)'s biological mother.
- Baby Dhriti Shettar as Diya – Srikanth's daughter.
- P. R. Varalakshmi as Rangammal – Sivaraman's mother.
- Varun Udhai as Raghuvaran – Lakshmi and Sivaraman's first son.
- Royal Swathi as Kavitha Raghuvaran – Lakshmi and Sivaraman's first daughter-in-law.
- Master Dushyanth Chakravarthi as Vinai – Raghuvaran and Kavitha's son.
- Sudharsanam as Kesavan – Lakshmi and Sivaraman's second son.
- Durga as Deepa Kesavan – Lakshmi and Sivaraman's second daughter-in-law.
- Shankaresh Kumar / Christy as Kavin – Anjali's one side love interest and maternal cousin.
- Vaishali Thaniga as Monica – Srikanth's younger sister.
- Guhan Shanmugam / Jebin John as Jegan – Monica's husband.
- Vijayalakshmi Subramani as Kokila Varadharajan, Kavin's mother.
- Prabhakaran / K. S. G. Venkatesh as Varadharajan - Kavin's father.
- Poojitha as Kavin's maternal cousin and fiancée.
- Balakumar as IPS officer.
- Yamuna Srinidhi as Sathya's mother.

=== Cameos ===
- Prajin as Srikanth – Thulasi's ex-fiancé (Dead).
- Malavika Avinash as Rajeshwari – Srikanth and Monica's mother (Dead).
- Ambika as Kamakshi Ammal.
- Deepa Shankar as Sakunthala, Eshwaramoorthy's younger sister.

== Production ==
=== Development ===
The success of the fictional drama Lakshmi Nivasa in Karnataka prompted Zee Tamil to create a Tamil-language remake. So that the channel planned to collaborated with Zee Kannada to launch the series for the first time. The production and technical team of the series Lakshmi Nivasa and Amruthadhaare which airs in Zee Kannada, marked to produce the Tamil version of Lakshmi Nivasa under the title Gettimelam. The Kannada films director and screenwriter Mahesh Rao and his wife Kirthika M Rao, a producer and investor was decided to produce Gettimelam under their production company "Keerthi Akshaya Network". Since the production is from Karnataka, the shooting primarily taking place in Bengaluru, Karnataka and with some scenes filming in Tamil Nadu.

=== Casting ===
Most of the cast members—such as Sibbu Suryan, Viraat, Soundarya Reddy, Chaya Singh, Sillilalli Anand, Ashwini R. Murthy, Royal Swathi, Master Dushyanth Chakravarthi and Baby Dhriti Shettar—all of whom are natives of Karnataka, were chosen to act. Chaya Singh, Sillilalli Anand, Royal Swathi and Master Dushyanth Chakravarthi are currently acting in Amruthadhaare, were selected to portray the respective roles in this series to avoid the call sheet date issues for both the series. After Meenakshi Ponnunga, Soundarya Reddy made a comeback through this series as "Anjali". Sun TV stars Sibbu Suryan and Viraat also re-entered television with this series after a long break. Shreekumar replaced Sibbu Suryan in the role of Vetrivel from episode 221. Ponvannan, Praveena and P. R. Varalakshmi joins the cast to play the prominent roles. Cherika (Ashwini) R. Murthy is right now working in Lakshmi Nivasa as a character Chelvi, was chosen by the team to reprise the same role, renamed "Revathy" in the series, opposite Sillilalli Anand. In February 2026, actor Madhan Pandian was cast as Sathiya.

== Adaptations ==
Language	Title	Original release	Network(s)	Last aired	Notes
Kannada	Lakshmi Nivasa ಲಕ್ಷ್ಮೀ ನಿವಾಸ	16 January 2024	Zee Kannada	Ongoing	Original
Malayalam	Manathe Kottaram മാനത്തെ കൊട്ടാരം	12 August 2024	Zee Keralam	3 May 2026	Remake
Marathi	Lakshmi Niwas लक्ष्मी निवास	23 December 2024	Zee Marathi	Ongoing	Remake
Tamil	Gettimelam கெட்டிமேளம்	20 January 2025	Zee Tamil	28 June 2026	Remake
Telugu	Lakshmi Nivasam లక్ష్మీ నివాసం	3 March 2025	Zee Telugu	Ongoing	Remake
Hindi	Lakshmi Niwas लक्ष्मी निवास	12 January 2026	Zee TV	Ongoing	Remake
Bengali	Kamala Nibas কমলা নিবাস	13 April 2026	Zee Bangla	Ongoing	Remake
