= Roopa Sree =

Indian film and television actress (born 1976)

Rupa Sree
- Born: 11 June 1976 (age 50); Chennai, Tamil Nadu, India
- Occupation: Actress
- Years active: 1992–2006; 2010–present

Rupa Sree (credited as Ragini in Kannada films) is an Indian actress who appeared in Tamil, Kannada and Malayalam films and also in television soap operas. She made her acting debut with the Malayalam film Kallanum Polisum (1992) with Mukesh in the lead.

== Biography ==
Sree was born 11 June 1976 in Chennai, Tamil Nadu. She has four sisters. She started her acting career, at the age of 13 years, as a heroine. later she moved to character roles and supporting roles. She appeared in glamorous roles as well. She took a break from movies after marriage. Her husband is also in film field. Again she made a comeback through serials, and now she is appearing in Tamil and Malayalam serials. She won the heart of Malayali audience through the role of 'Urmila devi' in Chandanamazha serial.

== Filmography ==
Year	Film	Role	Language	Notes
1992	Kallanum Polisum	Indhu	Malayalam	
1992	Enga Veetu Velan	-	Tamil	
1993	Idhaya Nayagan	Roopa	Tamil	
1993	Military Mava	Buchi	Kannada	Credited as Ragini in Kannada
1993	Jaga Mechida Huduga	Asha	Kannada	
1993	Gundana Maduve	Ambuja	Kannada	
1993	Bevu Bella	Rukku	Kannada	
1994	Pondattiye Deivam	Julie	Tamil	
1994	Thaatboot Thanjavoor	Durga	Tamil	
1994	Duet	Seema	Tamil	
1994	Prema Simhasana		Kannada	
1995	Ellame En Rasathan	Chinna Raani	Tamil	
1995	Gangai Karai Paattu	Ganga	Tamil	
1995	Dear Son Maruthu	Kaveri	Tamil	
1995	Arabikadaloram	Lisy	Malayalam	
1996	Sukhavasam	Meera	Malayalam	
1996	Vetri Mugam	Sheela	Tamil	
1997	Pudhayal	Gowri	Tamil	
1997	Kadavul	Shenbagam	Tamil	
1997	Janakiraman	Lalitha	Tamil	
1997	Ettupatti Rasa	Widow woman	Tamil	Guest appearance
1998	Kulirkaattu	-	Malayalam	
1999	Captain	Maya	Malayalam	
1999	Chinna Raja	-	Tamil	
2000	Vaanavil	Saravanan's wife	Tamil	
2009	Yavarum Nalam	Serial actress	Tamil	

== Television ==
Serials

year	Serial	Channel	Role	Language
	Pugazh	DD Podhigai	Savithri	Tamil
1996–1998	Kadhal Pagadai	Sun TV	Thangam	Tamil
2001–2002	Atthamma	Gemini TV	Ambika	Telugu
2002	Meera	DD Podhigai		Tamil
2002–2003	Mangalyam	Sun TV	Parvathi	Tamil
2003–2004	Akka	Gemini TV	Latha	Telugu
2004–2006	Ambigai	Sun TV	Ambika	Tamil
2004–2006	Ahalya	Sun TV	Gayathri	Tamil
2005	My Dear Bootham	Sun TV	Vasantha	Tamil
2005	Kadamattathu Kathanar	Asianet	Saramma/Yakshi	Malayalam
2010	Yaadhumagi Nindrai	Zee Tamil	Samyuktha	Tamil
2011–2013	Uthiripookkal	Sun TV	Yamuna	Tamil
2012	All In All Alamelu	KTV	Rekha	Tamil
2012	Asaigal	Mega TV		Tamil
2013–2014	Kaalabairavan	Jaya TV	Uma	Tamil
2014–2017	Chandanamazha	Asianet	Urmila Devi Jaypal Desai	Malayalam
2014	Sri Krishna Leelalu	E TV	Yashoda	Telugu
2015–2016	Vani Rani	Sun TV	Jyothi Manohar	Tamil
2016	Aluvayum Mathikariyum	Asianet Plus	Urmila Devi (Cameo Appearance)	Malayalam
2016–2017	Deivam Thandha Veedu	Star Vijay	Chitradevi Devraj	Tamil
2018–2021	Seethakalyanam	Asianet	Rajeshwari Devi / Radhika Devi	Malayalam
2019–2023	Barathi Kannamma	Star Vijay	Soundarya Devi	Tamil
2021	Rajarani Season 2	Star Vijay	Soundarya Devi	Tamil
2022	Ullathai Allitha	Colors Tamil	Cameo Appearance	Tamil
2022–2023	Ilakkiya	Sun TV	Janaki	Tamil
2023	Bharathi Kannamma 2	Star Vijay	Soundarya	Tamil
2023–2024	Ranjithame	Kalaignar TV	Vedhavalli	Tamil
2024	Veetuku Veedu Vaasapadi	Star Vijay	Sivagami (Photographic Appearance)	Tamil
2024	Chandrikayil Aliyunna Chandrakantham	Asianet	Anasuya Devi	Malayalam
2025	Ayyanar Thunai	Star Vijay	Shanthi (Photographic Appearance)	Tamil
2025–2026	Dhanam	Star Vijay	Rukmani	Tamil
2025	Manathe Kottaram	Zee Keralam	Urmila	Malayalam
2025	Kattathe Kilikkoodu	Asianet	Lakshmi (Photographic Appearance)	Malayalam
2025–present	Chembarathy	Zee Keralam	Ramadevi	Malayalam

Other shows

year	Program	Channel	Role	Language	Notes
2015	Badai Bungalow	Asianet	Guest	Malayalam	Chat show
2015	Ningalkkum Aakaam Kodeeshwaran	Asianet	Participant	Malayalam	Game show
2015	Kuttykalavara	Flowers	Mentor	Malayalam	Reality show
2015	In Serial House Inn	Asianet	Herself	Malayalam	Special show
2015	Asianet Comedy Awards	Asianet	Participant	Malayalam	Award show
2016	Comedy stars season 2	Asianet	Guest	Malayalam	Reality Show
2017	Ningalkkum Aakaam Kodeeshwaran	Asianet	Participant	Malayalam	Game Show
2019	Comedy stars season 2	Asianet	Guest	Malayalam	Reality Show
2019	Start Music Aaradhyam Paadum	Asianet	Participant	Malayalam	Game Show
2021	Engal Veetu Mahalakshmi	Star Vijay	Soundarya Devi	Tamil	Vijay TV awards special show
2021	Start Music Season 3	Star Vijay	Participant	Tamil	Game Show
2022	Vijayin Thanai Thalaivi	Star Vijay	Soundarya Devi	Tamil	Vijay TV awards special show
2022	Raju Vootla Party	Star Vijay	Guest	Tamil	
2022	Andakakasam	Star Vijay	Guest	Tamil	
2023	Start Music Aaradhyam Paadum	Asianet	Participant	Malayalam	Game Show

== Awards ==
Year	Ceremony	Category	Serial	Role	Result
2014	Asianet Television Awards	Best Character Actress	Chandanamazha	Urmila Devi	Won
2015	Asianet Television Awards	Best Character Actress	Chandanamazha	Urmila Devi	Won
2015	Asianet Television Awards	Most well dressed actress	Chandanamazha	Urmila Devi	Won
2015	Asianet Television Awards	Most Popular Actress	Chandanamazha	Urmila Devi	Nominated
2016	Asianet Television Awards	Best Character Actress	Chandanamazha	Urmila Devi	Nominated
2016	Asianet Television Awards	Most Popular Actress	Chandanamazha	Urmila Devi	Nominated
2016	Asianet Television Awards	Entertainer of the year (Female)	Chandanamazha	Urmila Devi	Won
2017	Asianet Television Awards	Best Character Actress	Chandanamazha	Urmila Devi	Nominated
2017	Asianet Television Awards	Special Jury	Chandanamazha	Urmila Devi	Won
2017	Vijay Television Awards	Vijay Television Awards for Best Mamiyar-Fiction	Deivam Thandha Veedu	Chitradevi	Nominated
2019	Asianet television awards	Best actress in a Negative role	Seetha kalyanam	Rajeswari Devi	Won
2021	Vijay Television Awards	Vijay Television Awards for Best Mamiyar-Fiction	Bharathi Kannamma	Soundarya Devi	Won
2023	Vijay Television Awards	Vijay Television Awards for Best Mother	Bharathi Kannamma	Soundarya Devi	Won

== Social Media Profiles ==
- https://instagram.com/rupasree01
