= Pondattiye Deivam =

- Poster
- Directed by: N. K. Viswanathan
- Written by: P. Kalaimani (dialogue)
- Screenplay by: N. K. Viswanathan
- Story by: P. Kalaimani
- Produced by: T. S. Saravanan
- Starring: S. Ve. Shekher; Sithara
- Cinematography: N. K. Viswanathan
- Edited by: V. Uthaya Sankaran
- Music by: Bala Bharathi
- Production company: Kalyani Cine Arts
- Release date: 4 March 1994
- Running time: 125 minutes
- Country: India
- Language: Tamil

Pondattiye Deivam (transl. Wife is Goddess) is a 1994 Indian Tamil-language comedy film directed by N. K. Viswanathan. The film stars S. Ve. Shekher and Sithara, with Janagaraj, V. K. Ramasamy, Vennira Aadai Moorthy, Vinu Chakravarthy, Livingston, Kovai Sarala and Roopa Sree playing supporting roles. The film, produced by T. S. Saravanan, was released on 4 March 1994.

== Plot ==
Pattabi (S. Ve. Shekher) is submitted to his dominating wife Parimala (Sithara) and she makes his life a living hell. Parimala is goodwill but she has a hysterical temper that is frightening her husband Pattabi. Pattabi works as a secretary in Cholla company and earns a decent salary, but his miserly wife forbids him to spend money and keeps all his money. So Pattabi spends his time lamenting about his wife's torture to others. The poor Pattabi is not helped by his irresponsible father Sundaram (Janagaraj) who always bets on horse races, his father-in-law Periya Karuppu Thevar (Vinu Chakravarthy) who only supports Parimala's choices and his nosy neighbour Vaidhyanathan (Vennira Aadai Moorthy) who doesn't miss an opportunity to put Pattabi in trouble. Only his Pattabi's boss (V. K. Ramasamy) understands his feelings. The killjoy Parimala has a twin sister: Shyamala. Unlike Parimala, Shyamala is a deaf and fearful person.

In the past, Parimala was an honest police officer. One day, Pattabi rushed to work in the morning with his scooter, he went through a red traffic light. Parimala and the police constables followed him, Pattabi ran away from them and fell into a swimming pool. Parimala then saved him from drowning. Because of this accident, she lost her job. Pattabi then married her.

One day, Parimala throws Sundaram out of their house, for Pattabi it's the straw that broke the camel's back. Pattabi's boss has a friend Pandiyan (Livingston), he is a jailbird and a true misogyny. He comes to help Pattabi from Parimala, but things don't go as planned. Pandiyan killed Parimala and with Pattabi's help, Pandiyan throws the dead body in a river.

Sundaram returns home with his newfound mistress Margaret (Kovai Sarala) and her daughter Julie (Roopa Sree). Sundaram then makes believe Periya Karuppu Thevar that Parimala ran away with another man. Periya Karuppu Thevar is hell bent to save his family's prestige so Shyamala passes off as Parimala. What transpires next forms the rest of the story.

== Cast ==
- S. Ve. Shekher as Pattabi
- Sithara as Parimala and Shyamala
- Janagaraj as Sundaram, Pattabi's father
- V. K. Ramasamy as Pattabi's boss
- Vennira Aadai Moorthy as Vaidhyanathan
- Vinu Chakravarthy as Periya Karuppu Thevar
- Livingston as Pandiyan
- Kovai Sarala as Margaret
- Roopa Sree as Julie
- Sharmili as Manonmani
- Idichapuli Selvaraj
- Typist Gopu as Kandaswamy
- O. A. K. Sundar
- Karuppu Subbiah
- T. K. S. Natarajan as Natarajan

== Soundtrack ==
The soundtrack were composed by Bala Bharathi, with lyrics written by Pulamaipithan and Muthulingam.

Song	Singer(s)	Duration
"Pombalathan Deivamedi"	Mano, Sujatha Mohan	4:10
"Naan Thaan Di"	Swarnalatha	3:13
"Nee Vesham Podhum"	Malgudi Subha	3:05
"Vaigai Karai Vaalum Deviye"	K. S. Chithra	4:50
"Ambal Nerula"	Swarnalatha	3:20

== Reception ==
Malini Mannath of The Indian Express labelled the film as "average entertainer" but she praised the lead pair.
