= Dear Son Maruthu =

1995 Tamil film

- Poster
- Directed by: M. Solai Rajendran
- Written by: M. Solai Rajendran
- Produced by: M. Jagannathan
- Starring: Rahman; Sivakumar; Soundarya
- Cinematography: K. B. Dhayalan; M. Kesavan
- Edited by: B. Lenin; V. T. Vijayan
- Music by: Deva
- Production company: Madhans Movie Creations
- Release date: 21 December 1995
- Running time: 140 minutes
- Country: India
- Language: Tamil

Dear Son Maruthu is a 1995 Indian Tamil language drama film directed by M. Solai Rajendran. The film stars Rahman, Sivakumar and Soundarya, with Siva, Roopa Sree, Manorama, Nassar, Srividya, Sudha and Delhi Ganesh playing supporting roles. It was released on 21 December 1995.

== Plot ==
The film starts with Maruthu leaving jail. Maruthu was mistakenly sent to jail by the lawyer Raani for a crime that he did not commit. Raani, who feels guilty of sending an innocent man to jail, asks for forgiveness, but Maruthu refuses her pardon and asks her to love him. Maruthu and Raani then fall in love with each other. Maruthu has a younger brother named Ravi, and the two brothers run a dance class. Maruthu is a kindhearted person, whereas Ravi is a womanizer.

Maruthu then befriends Viswanathan, a popular neurosurgeon. Viswanathan lives with his wife Parvathi and brother Vijay, who is a strict police officer. Viswanathan lost his only son Ashok during the village festival many years back; after this incident, Parvathi became mentally ill. Parvathi has the habit to bring a stranger at home, thinking that he is her son Ashok.

Kaveri has a one-sided love with Ravi, but she is too shy to express it. After knowing it, Maruthu accepts her love and tells it to his brother. One day, Ravi tries to rape Kaveri at his home, but Maruthu saves her in time and severely hurts his brother in the head. Ravi then dies from a serious head injury. Viswanathan then advises Maruthu to run away.

Later, Viswanathan discovers that Ravi is his lost son Ashok. One day, Parvathi brings Maruthu at his home, thinking that he is Ashok. What transpires next forms the rest of the story.

== Cast ==
- Rahman as Maruthu
- Sivakumar as Viswanathan
- Soundarya as Raani, Maruthu’s lover
- Siva as Ravi
- Roopa Sree as Kaveri
- Manorama as Kannamma
- Nassar as Vijay
- Srividya as Parvathi
- Sudha as Meenakshi
- Delhi Ganesh as Veeraiah
- Jagadish
- Loose Mohan as Velu
- Thideer Kannaiah as Munuswamy
- Ravishankar
- Raja Meghnagar

== Soundtrack ==
The soundtrack was composed by Deva. Old song Chinnachiru Kanmalar from Pathi Bakthi (1958) recreated for this movie.

Song	Singer(s)	Lyrics	Duration
"Chinnanchiru" (male)	Krishnaraj	Pattukkottai Kalyanasundaram	3:26
"Chinnanchiru" (female)	K. S. Chithra	Pattukkottai Kalyanasundaram	3:21
"Kaatril Midhanthadhu"	S. Janaki	Vairamuthu	3:50
"Malaikaathu"	Mano, Swarnalatha	Vairamuthu	4:42
"Malarodu Nilavu"	P. Unnikrishnan, K. S. Chithra	Piraisoodan	5:06
"Poovizhi Vaasalile"	Mano	Piraisoodan	5:01

== Reception ==
The Hindu wrote, "In spite of mounting evidence of the youth's involvement in a murder the doctor defends him. This ideal situation of conflicting viewpoints and clash of emotions have been fairly translated on the screen by director M. Solai Rajendran, son of well-known playwright Solamalai, in Madans Movie Creations, Dear Son Maruthu".
