= Viraat (actor, born 1989) =

Indian actor

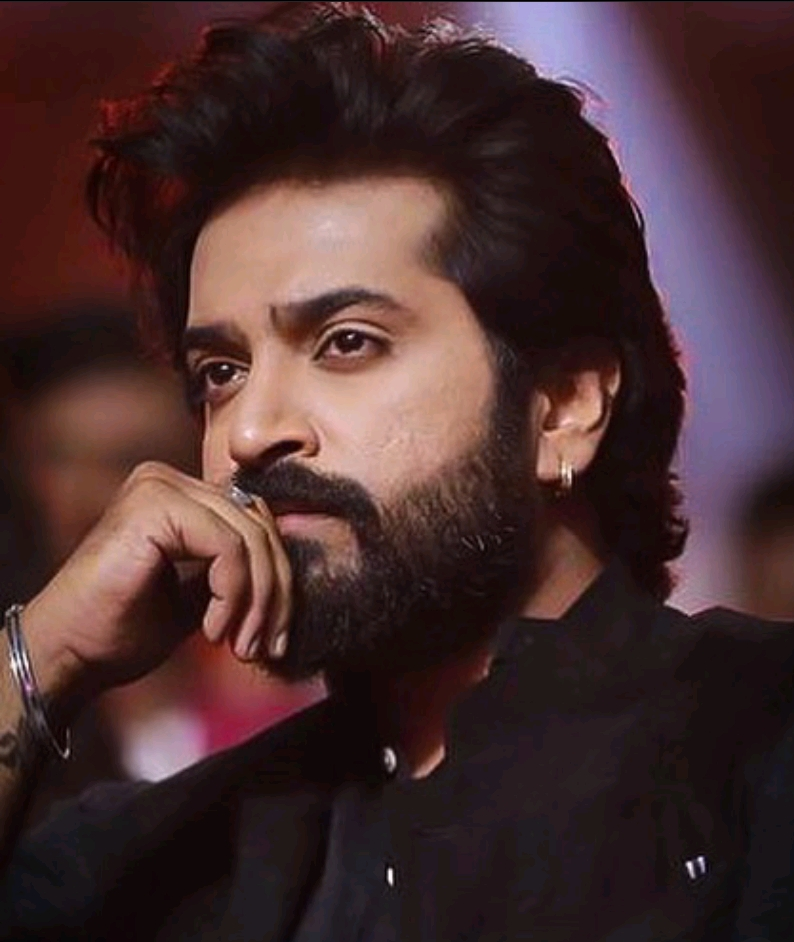
- Born: Naveen Kumar; 14 November 1989 (age 36); Gadag, Karnataka, India
- Occupations: Television actor; singer
- Years active: 2009 – present
- Spouse: Naveena Shaji (m. 2024)

Viraat (born Naveen Kumar; 14 November 1989) is an Indian actor, VFX artist, dancer and singer, who predominantly works in both the Kannada and Tamil industries.

He is known for playing lead roles in the soap operas Perazhagi and Anbe Vaa. He ranked 13th position in 2020 and 10th position in 2019, on the Chennai Times list of most-desirable men on television.

== Career ==
He started his career in 2006, with his debut in the Kannada film Black as a supporting role. His first film in a leading role was in 10th Class A Section (2009).

After this, he followed up with some films in both lead and supporting roles. He also worked as playback singer for some Kannada films. He is a VFX artist who edited motion posters for a few Kannada movies. He is credited to have been the one who introduced motion posters phenomena in Kannada film industry.

In 2014, he acted in and edited Ashtralle Just Missoo, a zero-budget film, which was received with good reviews. He edited, acted as lead in the film about a delinquent young man, who falls into wrong path, then recovers from it and leads a good life.

In the same year, he made his debut in the Kannada television industry through a Kannada serial, Shubhavivaha, where he replaced as Bhuvan in Episode 28, a lead role opposite actress Kaavya Shastry. His next serial was in 2016, Niharika in Star Suvarna with Tejaswini Prakash, a negative lead role named as Viraat Yaaji.

In 2018, he entered the Tamil television industry by playing a lead role, as Prithvi, in the serial Perazhagi opposite Gayathri Raj.

He is in Anbe Vaa for Sun TV, opposite actress and classical dancer Delna Davis, as male lead Varun.

In 2025, he is in the multistarred Gettimelam for Zee Tamil, as one of the male lead characters, as Mahesh Chandran.

== Filmography ==
=== Films ===
Year	Title	Role	Notes
2009	Black		debut film
2009	10th Class A Section	Shivu	first lead role
2014	Ashtralle Just Missoo	Shankar	

=== Other works ===
Year	Film	Notes	References
2014	Gajakesari	editor for motion poster	
2017	Hebbuli	editor for motion poster	

== Television ==
=== Serials and shows ===
Year	Title	Role	Channel	Language
2014–2016	Shubhavivaha	Bhuvan	Zee Kannada	Kannada
2016–2017	Niharika	Viraat Yaaji	Star Suvarna	Kannada
2018–2019	Perazhagi	Prithvi	Colors Tamil	Tamil
2020–2024	Anbe Vaa	Varun Krishna	Sun TV	Tamil
2021	Abhiyum Naanum	Varun Krishna (special appearance)	Sun TV	Tamil
2021	Kannana Kanne	Varun Krishna (special appearance)	Sun TV	Tamil
2022	Ilakkiya	Varun Krishna (special appearance)	Sun TV	Tamil
2024–2025	Mahanadigai	Mentor	Zee Tamil	Tamil
2025–2026	Getti Melam	Mahesh Chandran	Zee Tamil	Tamil

=== Shows ===
Year	Title	Role	Language	Channel
2020	Vanakkam Tamizha	guest	Tamil	Sun TV
2020	Yaarappa Indha Ponnu Special	Varun	Tamil	Sun TV
2021	Vanakkam Tamizha	guest	Tamil	Sun TV
2021	Poova Thalaya	contestant	Tamil	Sun TV
2021	Vada Da	himself	Tamil	Sun Music
2021	Vanakkam Tamizha	guest	Tamil	Sun TV
2021	Thalai Deepavali	Varun	Tamil	Sun TV
2022	Puthande Varuga	himself	Tamil	Sun TV
2022	Vanakkam Tamizha	guest	Tamil	Sun TV
2022	Maathi Yosi	contestant	Tamil	Sun TV
2022	Maathi Yosi	contestant	Tamil	Sun TV
2022	Vanakkam Tamizha	guest	Tamil	Sun TV
2022	Mathappu Mamiyar Pattas Marumagal	Varun	Tamil	Sun TV
2022	Maathi Yosi	contestant	Tamil	Sun TV
2023	Puthandu Aasai	Varun	Tamil	Sun TV
2023	Kalloori Pongal	contestant	Tamil	Sun TV
2023	Vanakkam Tamizha	guest	Tamil	Sun TV
2023	Super Kudumbam	Varun	Tamil	Sun TV

=== Other works ===
Year	Title	Role	Channel	Language	Reference
2021	Ullam Endroru Kovilile for Anbe Vaa	singer	Sun TV	Tamil	

== Awards ==
year	awards	category	notes	reference
2014	Zee Kutumba Awards	Style icon male	Shubhavivaha	
2016	Zee Kutumba Awards	Popular jodi	Shubhavivaha	
2022	Sun Kudumbam Viruthugal	Best actor male	Anbe Vaa	
2022	Sun Kudumbam Viruthugal	Best kaadal jodi	Anbe Vaa	
2023	Sun kudumbam viruthugal	Best kaadal jodi	Anbe Vaa	
