= Roja (2018 TV series) =

2018 Indian television series

- Season 1 montage
- Genre: Soap opera
- Screenplay by: S. Sekkizhar (1–410); V. Padmavathy (411–719); Rajarshi N Roy (720–1100); Guru Sampath Kumar (720–1100); S. Sekkizhar (1101–1316)
- Story by: Vasubharathy; Selvam Subbhaiya; Guru Sampath Kumar (dialogue)
- Directed by: Dhanush (1–48); V. Sadhasivam (49–1145); das (1146–1316)
- Creative director: Prince Immanuels
- Starring: Priyanka Nalkari; Sibbu Suryan; Niyaz Khan
- Theme music composer: Ravi Raghav
- Opening theme: "Kavithai Pole Vandhale Roja"; M.M Manasi (Vocals); Arun Bharathi (Lyrics)
- Composer: M. M. Manasi
- Country of origin: India
- Original language: Tamil
- No. of seasons: 2
- No. of episodes: 1316 (Season 1); 55 (Season 2)

Production
- Producer: Saregama India
- Cinematography: R. V. Parthiba Krishnan
- Editor: K. Shankar
- Camera setup: Multi-camera
- Running time: 22 minutes
- Production company: Saregama

Original release
- Network: Sun TV (Season 1); Saregama TV Shows Tamil (Season 2)
- Release: 9 April 2018 – 21 March 2025

Roja (transl. Rose) is an Indian Tamil-language drama television series produced by Saregama. Consisting of two seasons, that first aired on 9 April 2018 and concluded on 3 December 2022 respectively on Sun TV, it was written by Vasubharathy, Selvam Subbhaiya and Guru Sampath Kumar. The first season of this series starred Priyanka Nalkari, Sibbu Suryan, Shamili Sukumar and VJ Akshaya in lead roles. The first season premiered on 9 April 2018, and ended on 3 December 2022 with 1316 episodes.

The second season of this series premiered on 6 January 2025 aired on Saregama's YouTube Channel. It stars Priyanka Nalkari and Riyaz Khan in the lead role. The season focused on Roja and Arjun's daughter Malar, after a 24-years leap. The second season premiered on 6 January 2025, and ended on 21 March 2025 with 55 episodes The show was re-telecastied from January 19, 2026, at 09:00AM (Indian Standard Time).

== Series overview ==
Series	Episodes	Originally released	
Series	Episodes	First released	Last released
1	1316	9 April 2018	3 December 2022
2	55	6 January 2025	21 March 2025

== Plot ==
=== Season 1 ===
Roja follows a kind, optimistic girl who was raised in the orphanage of Shanthamoorthy. She happens to meet her biological father, Tiger Manickam, but they remain unaware of their genetic relationship. Roja is looking for a lawyer to represent Shanthamoorthy, who was falsely accused and arrested for Bhaiya Ganesh's murder, which was committed by Sakshi with Priya by her side. The lawyer she finds is Arjun, a leading criminal lawyer who is humble despite his wealth.

Arjun's family had planned his engagement with Priya (masquerading as "Fake Anu"). However, due to traumatic circumstances in his past, such as Sakshi's betrayal and the death of Arjun's friend Venu, Arjun forswore love and marriage. Therefore, he had no intention of marrying Priya. Arjun agrees to accept Roja's case on the condition that she would consent to one-year contract marriage with him. She agrees, and the two go to the temple on Arjun's engagement day. The wedding takes place with the help of Roja's friend Swetha and Arjun's assistant, Naveen. After registering the marriage, Arjun and Roja proceed to the engagement venue, where Arjun announces to his family his marriage to Roja, which stops the engagement. Roja goes to Arjun's house, where the two of them pretend to be husband and wife in front of the family. However, with time, Arjun discovers Roja's good qualities and falls in love with her. After a few struggles, Roja also falls in love with Arjun. Once the contract is terminated, the couple begins their life as a legitimate husband and wife in a supportive relationship.

Priya, who calls herself Anu, claims to be the daughter of Arjun's uncle, Tiger Manickam and his wife Shenbagam. (This same character, Shenbagam, is missing and presumed dead, but she is actually alive, suffering amnesia.) Priya works for a criminal mastermind, Sakshi. After failing to marry Arjun and enjoy his family's wealth, her primary goal becomes to marry Arjun's brother, Ashwin. She is cunning, and her charm wins over Arjun's grandmothers Annapoorni Manickam, Yasodha, and Balu, who always supports her even though she often humiliates Roja. Although Arjun's parents (Prathap and Kalpana) and Arjun's brother (Ashwin) support Roja, other family members dislike her. Due to unforeseen circumstances, Ashwin and Pooja marry without their families' knowledge, except for Arjun, Roja, and Kalpana.

Priya and Sakshi attempt to discredit Roja. They also go to great lengths to remove her from the house and kill her, but they fail to succeed in these efforts. Eventually, Arjun proves Shanthamoorthy's innocence in court and gets Priya and Sakshi arrested.

Annapoorani and Manickam both fake acts of being brainwashed to convince Roja to release Priya from jail. Annapoorani also arranges a reception for Arjun and Roja. When Priya and her team light a fire in an enclosed space, Arjun and Roja manage to escape; Priya, however, falls from a great height in trying to flee and ends up in a coma. Roja is blamed for this accident and sent to jail, where Sakshi, along with the help of Tiger Manickam, frequently attacks Roja. Arjun and Chandrakantha intercede to save her from these assaults. In an effort to ensure Roja's safety, Arjun kidnaps Priya. After a long battle in the court between Arjun and Tiger Manickam, Arjun blames Annapoorani, and Balu confesses the truth by playing a drama that he killed Priya. When the character Naveen brings Priya to the courtroom alive, Annapoorani is punished with 24 hours of jail time for trying to kill Roja and Arjun. Priya is granted bail on medical terms, and Roja is finally released.

With the help of Sakshi and Divya, Priya brings the Saraswati nurse home to play the role of Shenbagam. At the same time, Roja fights and performs pooja to get her mother back. While performing the final ritual, Shenbagam enters and saves Roja. Eventually, Shenbagam gains her old memories back, and all accept Roja as Arjun's wife. As the first night is arranged, Priya is furious and tries, but fails, to spoil it. The true face of Priya is revealed when she plants a bomb in Shenbagam's Locket. They immediately decide to take a DNA test. Priya raises concerns over Ashwin and Pooja's marriage to stop it. But to her shock, Annapoorani accepts their marriage, and their first night is arranged.

To stop the DNA test, Priya endeavors to kill Roja. While Shenbagam and Roja are driving in a car, Priya stops and shoots Roja. But unknown to her, Arjun has removed the active bullet. Chandrakantha then arrests Priya. To deceive their opponents, Arjun makes arrangements with Ashwin, Pooja, and Naveen to convince others that Roja is dead. He informs each of his family members of the plot except for Yashoda and Balu.

Arjun entices Roja to act possessed to extract the truth from Priya. After being frightened for two days, Priya confesses the truth to Chandrakantha, and Arjun also promises to tell the truth in court. Meanwhile, Neelambari, an old rival of Priya and Roja, has entered the show, digging up the past. Neelambari wants to seek revenge on Priya and Roja. With the help of her brother and Sakshi, they frantically search for Priya and Roja, and they also attack Shanthamurthy. Eventually, after a lot of twists, she is arrested.

After this temporary resolution, Roja informs Arjun that she is pregnant. Then, a previous enemy of Arjun, JS, joins up with Priya to kill Roja. They ultimately fail in this task, but they do push Roja into a river, causing her to lose her memory of Arjun and her family. Next, Chandrakantha introduces Jessi, a Roja look-alike. When Roja finally regains her memory, she attempts, and eventually succeeds, in performing pooja for the well-being of her unborn child. This irritates Priya, Yashoda, and Balu. Meanwhile, Priya learns of her real parents, Jayaseelan and Kamala. Js doesn't believe Priya, so they go to Roja to confirm what happened. The family joyfully embraces Roja as the first heir of the family, leading Pooja to feel abandoned and jealous. The show ends with Pooja teaming up with Arjun's arch enemy JS and Roja's arch enemy Priya to create more trouble for Roja.

=== Season 2 ===
The story takes a 24-year leap, focusing now on Malarvizhi a.k.a. Malar, daughter of Roja and the late Arjun. Malar lives peacefully with her mother in an ashram built by Arjun before his passing, dedicated to orphans and elderly people. However, Malar's peaceful life is disturbed when Antony Selva, son of Arjun's friend Arokiya Raj, engages Malar. Antony, driven by greed and control, wants to take over Malar's life and the ashram. Once Malar learns this, she expose his true ambition and makes him imprisoned.

During the course of the story, another character is introduced Madhiazhagan a.k.a. Madhi, a man who has suffered 18 love breakups and strongly believes in love marriage, just like his sister. Malar and Madhi enter into a mutual agreement where Madhi has one month to try to have Malar fall in love with him; if he succeeds, he is to marry her. But Malar has no feeling for love and dislikes men due to her past life, which makes the task on Madhi much more difficult.

As the story unfolds, Antony Selva is released from jail and seeks revenge. He devises various plans to gain control over the ashram and force Malar into a submissive situation. Now with newer challenges, the story harbors the following questions: Will Madhi make Malar fall in love with him? Will Malar marry Madhi? Will Madhi be able to save Malar from the clutches of Antony Selva?

== Cast ==
=== Season 1 ===
==== Main ====
- Priyanka Nalkari in a dual role as
  - Anu, a.k.a. Roja: Shenbagam and Tiger Manickam's elder daughter; (2018-2022)
  - SI. Jessica: Tiger Manickam and Shenbagam's younger daughter; (2021-2022)
- Sibbu Suryan as Advocate Arjun: A criminal lawyer; (2018-2022)

==== Recurring ====
- Shamili Sukumar (2018-2021) / VJ Akshaya (2021-2022) as Anu Jayaseelan a.k.a. Priya: A money minded criminal corrupted girl JS and Kamala's daughter; Roja's arch-rival
- Sowmya Rao Nadig / Sunitha Srinivasan as Saakshi: A money-minded criminal corrupted girl; Arjun's arch-rival (2018-2019) / (2020-2022)
- Vadivukkarasi as Annapoorani: Vijayakumar's wife; Shenbagam, Prathap and Yashodha's mother (2018-2022)
- Gayatri Shastry as Kalpana: Prathap's wife; Arjun, Ashwin, and Deepa's mother; (2018-2022)
- Venkat Renganathan / Shankaresh Kumar as Ashwin: Prathap and Kalpana's younger son; Arjun and Deepa's brother; Pooja's husband; Roja's brother in law (2018-2021) / (2021-2022)
- Smriti Kashyap as Pooja: Purushotaman and Prema's daughter; Ashwin's wife; Prathap and Kalpana's second daughter in law; Roja's co sister; Arjun's junior lawyer (2018-2022)
- Dev Anand Sharma as Balachandran, aka Balu: Yashodha's husband (2018-2022)
- Ramya Ramakrishnan / Kavyavarshini Arun as Yashodha, aka Yaso: Annapoorani and Vijayakumar's younger daughter; Shenbagam and Prathap's sister; Balu's wife; Koushik and Malar's mother, Roja's arch-rival (2018-2020) / (2021-2022)
- Dr. Sharmila as Shenbagam: Annapoorani and Vijayakumar's elder daughter; Prathap and Yashodha's sister; Manickam's wife; Roja and Jessica's mother (2018-2022)
- Rajesh as Advocate. Tiger Manickam: A criminal lawyer; Shenbagam's husband; Roja and Jessica's father (2018-2022)
- Shiva Subramanian as Prathap: Annapoorani and Vijayakumar's son; Shenbagam and Yashodha's brother; Arjun, Ashwin and Deepa's father (2018-2022)
- Hussain A. K. as Navaneetha Krishnan: Arjun's best friend henchmen
- Latha as Canada Kamakshi: Annaporani's elder sister
- Sumathi Sri as Sumathi: Annapoorani's housemaid
- Kavithalaya Krishnan as Purushotthaman: Prema's husband; Pooja's father
- Shanthi Anandraj as Prema: Purushotthaman's wife; Pooja's mother
- Vasu Vikram as Advocate. Jayaseelan, aka JS: Kamala's husband; Priya's father; Arjun's arch-rival
- Padmini Chandrasekaran as Kamala: JS's wife; Priya's mother
- K. Natraj as Shanthamurthy, aka Moorthy: Orphanage caretaker; Roja's adoptive father
- Akhila Ramanamoorthy as Deepa: Prathap and Kalpana's daughter; Arjun and Ashwin's sister
- Farzana Ansari as Malar: Yasodha and Balu's daughter; Koushik's sister
- Sri Varshan Chinraj as Koushik: Yasodha and Balu's son; Malar's brother
- Vivethan Ravi as Buji: Pooja's brother

==== Other Cast ====
- Rani as AC. Chandrakantha: Arjun's best friend and henchmen
- P. R. Varalakshmi as Arulvakhu Amuthanayaki
- Lakesh as Shyam: JS's henchman and Arjun's arch enemy
- Srilekha Rajendran as Devaki
- Gajesh as Jagan: Arjun's arch enemy
- Kiruba as Rosy: Victor's wife; Jessica's adoptive mother
- Raj Kapoor as Victor: Rosy's husband; Jessica's adoptive father
- Sona Heiden as Neelambari: Roja and Arjun's arch enemy
- Vijjith as Sasitharan "Sasi": Neelambari's brother, Roja and Arjun's arch enemy
- Dubbing Janaki as Baalu mother
- SVS Kumar as Baalu father
- Sasindhar Pushpalingam as Bhaya Ganesh: Priya's ex-husband and lover (2018-2019) (Dead)
- Neeshant as Santhosh - Roja's ex-love interest
- Surjith Ansary as Ramesh - Roja's brother
- Shwetha as Shwetha
- Geetha Narayanan as Judge
- Karthika Bose as Keerthi
- Swetha as Lakshmi
- Vanitha Hariharan as Ponni
- Girish as Sethu
- S.D. Ganesh as Ranjith
- Rekha Suresh as Deivanai
- Manohar Krishna as Marudhanayagam - Saakshi's father
- Keerthana as Arulvakhu Vedhavalli
- Rohan as Ragu, aka Sandy
- Gowthami Vembunathan as Valli

==== Special appearances ====
- Anbalaya Prabhakaran as Vijayakumar: Annapoorni's husband; Shenbagam, Prathap and Yashodha's father
- Anuradha Krishnamurthy as Judge Sivagami
- Rani as Indrasena
- Nadhiya as herself
- Vinodhini as Pachaikili
- Giri Dwarakish as Pichaimuthu
- Yashika Aannand as herself
- Neha Gowda as Nisha
- Vinaya Prasad as Renuka Devi
- Trivikraman as Ashok Selvan
- Y. G. Mahendran as Suresh Chakravarthy
- Anuradha Krishnamurthy as Sangeetha Chakravarthy
- Gayathri as Manju Chakravarthy
- Shwetha Bandekar as Chandra Sanjay
- Naagasree GS as Lekha Sabarinathan
- Munaf Rahman as Sanjaykumar a.k.a. Sanjay Parandhaman
- Arun Kumar Rajan as Sabarinathan a.k.a. Sabari
- VJ Azhar as himself
- Delna Davis as Bhoomika
- Nalini as Parameshwari
- Nila Gracy as Shubha
- Ameen Fakkir as Sekar
- Nidhish Kutty as Lord Krishna
- Chaitra Reddy as Kayal

=== Season 2 ===
==== Main ====
- Priyanka Nalkari in a dual role as
  - Malarvizhi "Malar" - Arjun and Roja's daughter, Velan's sister (2025)
  - Roja: Shenbagam and Tiger Manickam's daughter; Arjun's wife; Velan and Malar's mother (2025)
- Niyaz Khan as Madhiazhagan "Madhi": Malar's love interest (2025)

==== Recurring ====
- Swetha Senthilkumar as Aditi - Malar's friend
- Rajkumar as Venky - Madhi's brother-in-law
- Kambam Meena as Meenakshi - Madhi's mother
- Ismath Banu as Selvi - Malar's friend
- Haripriya Isai as Manimegalai - Madhi's sister
- Baby Yaazhini as Yaazhini - Madhi's niece
- Surya as Antony Selva - Malar's ex-fiance (Main Antagonist)
- Silmisham Siva as Nagesh - Madhi's friend
- Ashok Pandian as Sundaram - Madhi's father
- Andrews as Advocate Arokiya Raj - Arjun's friend and Selva's father
- Banu as Mariyal - Selva's mother
- Niranjana as Poongkodi - Madhi's cousin
- Vaishnavi as Inspector Vaishu
- Monkey Ravi as Ajith Sethupathi

==== Guests ====
- Sibbu Suryan as Advocate Arjun: A criminal lawyer; Prathap and Kalpana's elder son; Roja's husband; Velan and Malar's father (2025) (Dead) (in a photographic appearance)
- Jishnu Menon as Jishnu - American Mappilai (2025)
- Pavithra as Maladhi - Madhi's ex-lover (2025)

== Production ==
=== Filming ===
Due to the COVID-19 outbreak in India, Roja and all other Indian television series and film productions were suspended from 19 March 2020. Three months later, shooting was permitted, and the team commenced filming in July. The show telecasted new episodes on 27 July 2020. With the increase in COVID-19 cases in Tamil Nadu, the production was once again suspended in mid-May 2021 for a few weeks.

=== Casting ===
==== Season 2 ====
Actress Priyanka Nalkari, who acted in the first season, has also played the role of Malar in this second season. Niyaz Khan portrayed male lead roles as Haripriya Isai was cast as main role.

=== Crossover episodes ===
- Crossover with Lakshmi Stores (13-18 May 2019) (Episodes 325–331)
- Crossover with Poove Unakkaga (12-18 October 2020) (Episodes 655–660)
- Cameo crossover with Kannana Kanne and Anbe Vaa

== Adaptations ==
Since February 2019, Roja has been remade in other languages such as in Kannada, Telugu, Malayalam and Bengali. It is broadcast on Sun TV Network's group of channels in the respective languages.

Language	Title	Original release	Network(s)	Last aired	Notes	Ref.
Tamil	Roja ரோஜா	9 April 2018	Sun TV	21 March 2025	Original	
Kannada	Sevanthi ಸೇವಂತಿ	25 February 2019	Udaya TV	04 July 2026	Remake	
Telugu	Roja రోజా	11 March 2019	Gemini TV	27 March 2020	Remake	
Hindi	Sindoor Ki Keemat सिंदूर की कीमत	18 October 2021	Dangal TV	29 April 2023	Remake	
Malayalam	Kaliveedu കളിവീട്	15 November 2021	Surya TV	22 September 2024	Remake	
Bengali	Saathi সাথী	7 February 2022	Sun Bangla	3 August 2024	Remake	
Marathi	Tharala Tar Mag! ठरलं तर मग!	5 December 2022	Star Pravah	Ongoing	Remake	

== Reception ==
=== Ratings ===
Initially aired at 3:00 PM IST, positive audience reception led the station to reschedule the show to a prime time slot of 9:00 PM IST in early 2019. Within three months, the show was shifted once more to 7:00 PM IST. It was shifted again in 2021 to 9:00 PM IST.

Week and year	BARC viewership (Tamil GEC)		Ref(s)
Week and year	Impressions (in millions)	Ranking	Ref(s)
Week 3, 2020	9.54	3	
Week 8, 2020	10.17	2	
Week 31, 2020	8.64	2	
Week 34, 2020	7.12	3	
Week 37, 2020	7.76	4	
Week 39, 2020	8.37	4	
Week 6, 2021	8.62	2	
Week 7, 2021	8.23	3	
Week 8, 2021	7.95	3	
Week 9, 2021	7.81	3	
Week 10, 2021	8.78	1	
Weel 12, 2021	8.42	1	
Week 14, 2021	8.68	1	
Week 15, 2021	8.49	3	
Week 16, 2021	8.85	1	
Week 18, 2021	8.95	1	
Week 19, 2021	9.36	2	
Week 20, 2021	9.12	2	
Week 21, 2021	9.22	3	
Week 22, 2021	9.54	3	

== Awards and honours ==
Award (Note: Awards, festivals and organizations are in Alphabetical order.)	Date of ceremony (Note: Date is linked to the article about the awards held that year, wherever possible.)	Category	Recipient(s)	Result	Ref.
Sun Kudumbam Viruthugal	2019	Best Heroine	Priyanka Nalkari - Roja	Won	
Sun Kudumbam Viruthugal	2019	Popular Hero	Sibbu Suryan - Arjun	Won	
Sun Kudumbam Viruthugal	2019	Popular Villi	Shamily Sukumar - Priya	Won	
Sun Kudumbam Viruthugal	2019	Popular Couple	Priyanka Nalkari and Sibbu Suryan - Roja and Arjun "Rojun"	Won	
Sun Kudumbam Viruthugal	2019	Popular Serial	Roja	Won	
Sun Kudumbam Viruthugal	2019	Best Mamiyar	Gayatri Shastry - Kalpana	Won	
Sun Kudumbam Viruthugal	2019	Best Brother	Venkat Renganathan - Ashwin	Nominated	
Sun Kudumbam Viruthugal	2019	Best Jodi	Priyanka Nalkari and Sibbu Suryan - Roja and Arjun	Nominated	
Sun Kudumbam Viruthugal	2022	Best Mamiyar	Gayatri Shastry- Kalpana	Won	
