= Saravana Vickram =

Indian television actor (born 1995)

- Born: 28 June 1995 (age 29); Theni, Tamil Nadu, India
- Other names: Saravanan Vikram
- Occupation: Actor
- Years active: 2018–2024
- Known for: Pandian Stores; Bigg Boss Season 7

Saravana Vickram (born 28 June 1995) is an Indian former television actor. He is known for portraying Jayakannan aka Kannan in Pandian Stores which aired on Star Vijay. He is also known for his participation in the reality show Bigg Boss 7 as a contestant in which he was evicted on day 84.

== Career ==
Vickram started his career as a YouTuber where he uploads videos of blogging, cooking and travelling with his girlfriend. He has over 280k subscribers on his channel.

In 2018, Vickram made his acting debut in a supporting role in the television serial Pandian Stores playing the role Jayakannan (aka Kannan) which aired on Star Vijay.

In 2023, he participated in the reality show Bigg Boss (Tamil season 7) as a contestant. However he was evicted on day 84.

In 2024, Vickram announced his retirement from the Indian television entertainment due to personal issues.

== Television ==
Year	Title	Role	Ref.
2018–2023	Pandian Stores	Jayakannan (Kannan)	
2020;2023	Bharathi Kannamma	Jayakannan (Kannan)	Special appearance
2021–2022	Baakiyalakshmi	Jayakannan (Kannan)	Special appearance
2023	Start Music (season 4)	Contestant	Winner
2023 - 2024	Bigg Boss (Tamil season 7)	Contestant	Evicted Day 84
2024-present	Mahanadigai	Mentor	

== Awards ==
Year	Award	Category	Role	Show	Result
2023	Vijay Television Awards	Best Supporting Actor - Male	Jayakannan (Kannan)	Pandian Stores	Won
