= Priyanka Nalkari =

Indian actress

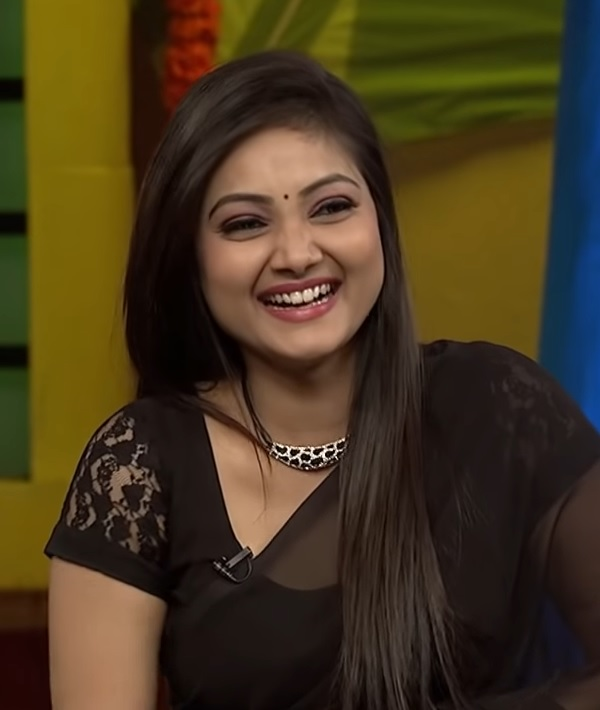
- Priyanka in a television show in January 2018
- Born: April 29, 1994 (age 32)
- Occupations: Actress; model
- Years active: 2014–present
- Known for: Roja (2018 - 2022)

Priyanka Nalkari (born April 29, 1994) is an Indian actress and anchor who works in Tamil and Telugu television and films. She is best known for playing the title role in Sun TV's show Roja (2018–2022).

== Career ==
Priyanka is an Indian film and television actress native to Hyderabad. In 2010, she debuted in the Telugu film Andari Bandhuvaya directed by Chandra Siddhartha. She also played an uncredited role in Kick 2 (2015). Kanchana 3 (2019) is the first featured Kollywood film of Priyanka Nalkari. In 2018, she came to limelight after her portrayal in the Tamil serial Roja. Previously, she featured in the Telugu serial Meghamala which was aired on ETV Telugu. She has also featured in the comedy reality show Anubhavinchu Raja. She also portrayed the sister role of Sudheer Babu in Shiva Manasulo Sruthi (2012).

== Filmography ==
=== Films ===
- All films are in Telugu language unless otherwise noted.

Year	Title	Role	Notes
2010	Andari Bandhuvaya	Priyanka	
2013	Theeya Velai Seiyyanum Kumaru	Sanjana's friend	Tamil film
2013	Naa Saami Ranga	Latha	
2014	Welcome to America	Samantha	
2015	Kick 2	Kamala bhai's daughter	
2016	Hyper	Priyanka	
2017	Nene Raju Nene Mantri	Sushmitha	
2018	W/O Ram	Sneha	Cameo appearance
2019	Kanchana 3	Moshika	Tamil film

=== TV serials ===
Year	Title	Role	Language	Channel
2014	Aahvaanam		Telugu	Gemini TV
2014–2016	Meghamala		Telugu	ETV Telugu
2014	Mangamma Gari Manavaralu		Telugu	Zee Telugu
2015	Sravana Sameeralu	Indu	Telugu	Gemini TV
2018–2022	Roja	Roja and Jessica	Tamil	Sun TV
2023	Seetha Raman	Seetha	Tamil	Zee Tamil
2023–2024	Nala Damayanthi	Damayanthi	Tamil	Zee Tamil
2025	Roja 2	Roja and Malar	Tamil	Saregama TV Shows Tamil
2025	Maari	Jennifer	Tamil	Zee Tamil
2025–2026	Lakshmi Raave Maa Intiki	Sindhu	Telugu	Zee Telugu
2026	Idhayam	Madhumitha	Tamil	Zee Tamil
2026	Ayali	Pallavi	Tamil	Zee Tamil

=== TV shows ===
Year	Title	Language	Channel
2017	Sarrainollu	Telugu	ETV Telugu
2017	Star Mahila	Telugu	ETV Telugu
2018	ETV Sarada Sankaranthi Special Event	Telugu	ETV Telugu
2018	Anubhavinchu Raja	Telugu	ETV Plus
2018	Gold Rush	Telugu	Zee Telugu
2018	Savale Samali	Tamil	Sun TV
2020	Kalai with Kamal	Tamil	Adithya
2020	Vanakkam Tamizha	Tamil	Sun TV
2020	Prati Roju Pandage	Telugu	ETV Telugu
2021	Vada da	Tamil	Sun Music
2021	Vanakkam Tamizha	Tamil	Sun TV
2021	Rowdy Baby	Tamil	Sun TV
2021	Poova Thalaya	Tamil	Sun TV
2022	Azhagiya Amma	Tamil	Sun TV
2022	Roja Rojadan	Tamil	Sun TV
2022	Maathi Yosi	Tamil	Sun TV
2022	Ananda Raagam Varaverpu Vizha	Tamil	Sun TV
2022	Roja Vetri Vizha	Tamil	Sun TV
