= Perazhagi =

Indian Tamil-language soap opera

- Genre: Melodrama; Family
- Written by: Pon. Ilango
- Screenplay by: Pon. Ilango; Dialogues; Pon. Ilango
- Directed by: S. Vaithi
- Starring: Gayathri Raj; Viraat; Manjula Paritala; VJ Saravana Kumar; Dipti sree
- Theme music composer: Paranitharan
- Country of origin: India
- Original language: Tamil
- No. of seasons: 1
- No. of episodes: 493

Production
- Producers: K. Saravanan; T.R.B Manonmani
- Production location: Tamil Nadu
- Editors: Leno; Subash
- Camera setup: Multi-camera
- Running time: approx. 22–24 minutes per episode

Original release
- Network: Colors Tamil
- Release: 20 February 2018 – 21 December 2019

Perazhagi is a 2018 Tamil-language soap opera which is directed by Pon Ilango and starring Gayathri, Viraat, Dipti sree, VJ Saravana Kumar, Manjula Paritala, and Porkodi. It aired on Colors Tamil from 20 February 2018 – 21 December 2019. The story about young girl Pothum Ponnu explores the social impacts of skin colour.

== Synopsis ==
Pothum Ponnu Childhood

A young girl called Pothum Ponnu (Played by Dipti Sree) is always jovial and smiling. However, people from her society dislike her due to her dark skin color and how short she is, bringing her self-esteem down and upsetting her. However, she overcomes this and tries to forget the negative comments. During these times, her mother Parvathy (Played by Porkodi) has always supported her.

Podhum Ponnu Present

Pothum Ponnu is now in Chennai due her to problems in her hometown. However, using this opportunity, she tries find work in Chennai. Unfortunately, she is not able to find work due to some problems . However, due to her uprising spirit, she was able to preserve herself to become an actress by overcoming the problems she faced which lead her to become the main heroine of the mega movie "Kaviya Thalaivi".

== Cast ==
=== Main ===
- Gayathri Raj as Pothum Ponnu / Kayal (Episode: 11 − present)
- Deepthi Sri as Young Pothum Ponnu (Episode: 1 − 11)
- Viraat as Prithvi − Kayal's husband
- VJ Saravana Kumar as Karthick, Assistant Director; Kayal Best Friend, Sheela husband

=== Recurring ===
- C. Ranganathan as Paramashivam a.k.a. Shivam − Prithvi's car driver
- Manjula Paritala as Nethra (Main Antagonist)
- Sujatha Panju as Janaki − Prithvi's mother
- Geetha Ravishankar as Kamatchi − Prithvi's maternal aunt
- Ravishankar as Vishwanathan − Prithvi's maternal uncle; Janaki's brother; Kamatchi's husband
- Issac Varkees as Aaruchami − Kayal's father
- Porkodi as Parvathy − Kayal's mother
- Preethi Pritu as Kavitha − Kayal's younger sister
- Unknown as Prem Kumar − Kayal's younger brother-in-law; Kavitha's husband
- Hensha Deepan as Prem's sister
- Subbalakshmi as Vellaiamma − Kayal's paternal grandmother
- Tarun Master as Nagureddy − Film director
- Mithun as John − Nethra's arch-rival
- Keerthi Jai Dhanush as Sudha − An actress
- Unknown as Sheela − Junior actress
- Unknown as Shantha
- Indhu Ravichandran as Kalai − Kayal's childhood friend
- Sowmiya Ravindran as Vaani − Kayal's friend
- Unknown as Latha − Kayal's aunt
- Unknown as Saraswathi − Aaruchami's younger sister
- Gowri Jaanu as Maha − Aaruchami's elder sister

== Title song ==
=== Soundtrack ===
Track list
No.	Title	Lyrics	Music	Length
1.	"Varam Tharum Ival (வரம் தரும் இவள்) Title Song"	Paranitharan; S. Vaithi	Paranitharan	2:00
2.	"Kaakkai Siraginile (காக்கை சிறகினிலே)"			2:20
3.	"Veesum Kaatru (வீசும் காற்று)"
