= 2025 in Tamil television =

The following is a list of events affecting Tamil television drama in 2025 from India (Tamil Nadu), Singapore, Sri Lanka, Malaysia and the Tamil diaspora. Events listed include television show debuts and finales; channel launches and closures; stations changing or adding their network affiliations; and information about changes of ownership of channels or stations.

== Television shows ==
=== Drama series and variety shows debuting in 2025 ===
Date	Show	Tamil title	Network(s)	Status	Ref
January / தை
20	Manasellam	மனசெல்லாம்	Zee Tamil	Ended	
20	Gettimelam	கெட்டி மேளம்	Zee Tamil	Ended	
20	Sindhu Bairavi Kacheri Arambam	சிந்து பைரவி கச்சேரி ஆரம்பம்	Star Vijay	Ended	
25	Jodi Are U Ready season 2	ஜோடி ஆர் யூ ரெடி 2	Star Vijay	Ended	
26	Startup Singam	ஸ்டார்ட்அப் சிங்கம்	Star Vijay	Ended	
27	Ayyanar Thunai	அய்யனார் துணை	Star Vijay	Ongoing	
February / மாசி
2	Therikkavidalama	தெறிக்கவிடலாமா	Sun TV	Ended	
3	Poongodi	பூங்கொடி	Sun TV	Ongoing	
17	Dhanam	தனம்	Star Vijay	Ended	
23	Oo Solriya Oo Oohm Solriya 3	ஊ சொல்றியா ஓஓஓம் சொல்றியா 3	Star Vijay	Ended	
24	Mayil	மயில்	Colors Tamil	Stopped	
24	Kadhala Kadhala	காதலா காதலா	Colors Tamil	Stopped	
March / பங்குனி
1	Dance Jodi Dance Reloaded season 3	டான்ஸ் ஜோடி டான்ஸ் ரீலோடட் 3	Zee Tamil	Ended	
2	All in All Azhagu Rasa	ஆல் இன் ஆல் அழகு ராசா	Sun TV	Ended	
2	Naanga Ready Neenga Readya 2	நாங்க ரெடி நீங்க ரெடியா 2	Sun TV	Ended	
17	Raman Thediya Seethai	ராமன் தேடிய சீதை	Zee Tamil	Stopped	
20	Selvi	செல்வி	Thanthi One	Ended	
23	Annamalai	அண்ணாமலை	Thanthi One	Ended	
30	Naanum Rowdy Dhaan	நானும் ரௌடி தான்	Sun TV	Ended	
April / சித்திரை
7	Aadukalam	ஆடுகளம்	Sun TV	Ended	
14	Sarojini	சரோஜினி	DD Tamil	Stopped	
28	Poongatru Thirumbuma	பூங்காற்று திரும்புமா	Star Vijay	Ended	
28	Meenakshi Sundaram	மீனாட்சி சுந்தரம்	Kalaignar TV	Ended	
May / வைகாசி
4	Cooku with Comali season 6	குக்கு வித் கோமாளி சீசன் 6	Star Vijay	Ended	
24	Sa Re Ga Ma Pa Seniors season 5	ச ரி க ம ப சீனியர்ஸ் சீசன் 4	Zee Tamil	Ended	
26	Vinodhini	வினோதினி	Sun TV	Ended	
26	House Kanavan	ஹவுஸ் கணவன்	Astro Vinmeen	Ended	
31	Bakthi Super Singer	பக்தி சூப்பர் சிங்கர்	Star Vijay	Ended	
June / ஆனி
2	Ayali	அயலி	Zee Tamil	Ongoing	
9	Thendrale Mella Pesu	தென்றலே மெல்ல பேசு	Star Vijay	Ongoing	
15	Start Music 6	ஸ்டார்ட் மியூசிக் 6	Star Vijay	Ended	
29	Sound Party	சவுண்ட் பார்ட்டி	Star Vijay	Ended	
30	Varisu	வாரிசு	Zee Tamil	Ongoing	
July / ஆடி
13	Samayal Express 2	சமையல் எக்ஸ்பிரஸ்	Zee Tamil	Ended	
14	Aadhira	ஆதிரா	Astro Vinmeen	Ended	
21	Chinnanchiru Kiliye	சின்னஞ்சிறு கிளியே	Zee Tamil	Ongoing	
August / ஆவணி
2	Super Singer 11	சூப்பர் சிங்கர் 11	Star Vijay	Ended	
10	Single Pasanga	சிங்கிள் பசங்க	Zee Tamil	Ended	
11	Magale En Marumagale	மகளே என் மருமகளே	Star Vijay	Ended	
17	Top Cooku Dupe Cooku season 2	டாப் குக்கு டூப் குக்கு சீசன் 2	Sun TV	Ended	
25	Kaathuvaakula Rendu Kaadhal	காத்துவாக்குல ரெண்டு காதல்	Kalaignar TV	Ended	
31	Ranjithame 4	ரஞ்சிதாமே 4	Sun TV	Ended	
September / புரட்டாதி
1	Magarantham 2	மகரந்தம் 2	Astro Vinmeen	Ended	
8	Parijatham	பாரிஜாதம்	Zee Tamil	Ongoing	
October / ஐப்பசி
5	Bigg Boss 9	பிக் பாஸ் 9	Star Vijay	Ended	
13	Urvasi	ஊர்வசி	Astro Vinmeen	Ended	
28	Idhayam Thotta Kathaigal	இதயம் தொட்ட கதைகள்	Astro Vinmeen	Ended	
November / கார்த்திகை
24	Annamalai Kudumbam	அண்ணாமலை குடும்பம்	Zee Tamil	Ongoing	
December / மார்கழி
8	Pasanga 3	பசங்க 3	Astro Vinmeen	Ended	
13	Sa Re Ga Ma Pa Tamil Li'l Champs season 5	ச ரி க ம ப லிட்டில் சாம்பியன்ஸ் 5	Zee Tamil	Ended	
15	Chellame Chellame	செல்லமே செல்லமே	Sun TV	Ended	

== Debut web series ==
Start	Show	Tamil title	Network(s)	Director	Ref
January / தை
6	Roja 2	ரோஜா 2	Saregama	J.S.Vadivel	
9	Vera Maari Trip	வேரா மாரி ட்ரிப்	Aha Tamil	Jaswini J	
17	Thaara	தாரா	Vision Time Tamil	Arun Mithiran	
February / மாசி
14	Madurai Paiyanum Chennai Ponnum	மதுரை பையனும் சென்னை பொண்ணும்	Aha Tamil	Vignesh Pazhanivel	
21	Office	ஆபீஸ்	Disney+ Hotstar	Adbul Kabeez	
28	Suzhal: The Vortex 2	சுழல் 2	Amazon Prime Video	Bramma G, Anucharan Murugaiyan	
March / பங்குனி
28	Om Kali Jai Kali	ஓம் காளி ஜெய் காளி	Disney+ Hotstar	Ramu Chellappa	
28	Seruppugal Jaakirathai	செருப்புகள் ஜாக்கிரதை	ZEE5	Rajesh Soosairaj	
May / வைகாசி
23	Heart Beat 2	ஹார்ட் பீட் 2	Disney+ Hotstar	Deepak Sundarrajan	
July / ஆணி
4	Good Wife	குட் வைவ்	Disney+ Hotstar	Revathi	
18	Sattamum Neethiyum	சட்டமும் நீதியும்	ZEE5	Balaji Selvaraj	
September / புரட்டாதி
19	Police Police	போலீஸ் போலீஸ்	Disney+ Hotstar	Koan; Chidambaram Manivannan	
19	Sshhh 2	ஷ்	Aha Tamil	Amit Bhargav, Sriranjani, Mohan Govindan, Mathivanan S, Meyyendiran, Goutham Ravisankar, Vinodh Ravisankar	
October / ஐப்பசி
2	The Game: You Never Play Alone		Netflix	Rajesh M. Selva	
10	Veduvan	வேடுவன்	ZEE5	Pavan	
November / கார்த்திகை
20	Nadu Center	நடு சென்டர்	Disney+ Hotstar	Naru Narayanan	
28	Regai	ரேகை	ZEE5	M. Dhinakaran	
December / மார்கழி
5	Dhoolpet Police Station	தூல்பேட் போலீஸ் ஸ்டேஷன்	Disney+ Hotstar		
5	Kuttram Purindhavan: The Guilty One	குற்றம் புரிந்தவன்	SonyLIV	Selvamani	

== Ending this year ==
=== Series ending in 2025 ===
End date	Show	Network(s)	First aired	Total episodes	Genre	Ref
January
2 January	Uppu Puli Kaaram உப்பு புளி காரம்	Disney+ Hotstar	30 May 2024	128	Web-series	
10 January	Anamika அனாமிகா	Sun TV	19 May 2024	46	Series	
17 January	Nenjathai Killadhe நெஞ்சத்தைக் கிள்ளாதே	Zee Tamil	1 July 2024	148	Series	
19 January	Ninaithen Vandai நினைத்தேன் வந்தாய்	Zee Tamil	22 January 2024	285	Series	
19 January	Bigg Boss Tamil 8 பிக் பாஸ் தமிழ் 8	Star Vijay	6 October 2024	106	Reality show	
February
1 February	Malar மலர்	Sun TV	27 February 2023	585	Series	
2 February	Mahanadigai மகாநடிகை	Star Vijay	5 October 2024	18	Reality show	
16 February	Company கம்பெனி	Star Vijay	15 September 2024	22	Game show	
23 February	Naanga Ready Neenga Readya நாங்க ரெடி நீங்க ரெடியா	Sun TV	6 October 2024	20	Reality show	
March
19 March	Chellamay செல்லமே	Thanthi One	20 May 2024	305	Re-telecast series	
21 March	Roja 2 ரோஜா 2	Saregama	6 January 2025	55	Web-series	
22 March	Ilavarasi இளவரசி	Thanthi One	20 May 2024	308	Re-telecast series	
23 March	All in All Azhagu Rasa ஆல் இன் ஆல் அழகு ராசா	Sun TV	2 March 2025	4	Comedy show	
23 March	Therikkavidalama தெறிக்கவிடலாமா	Sun TV	2 February 2025	3	Reality show	
29 March	Panivizhum Malarvanam பணிவிழும் மலர்வணம்	Star Vijay	24 June 2024	219	Series	
April
6 April	Ranjani ரஞ்சனி	Sun TV	4 November 2024	152	Series	
25 April	Nee Naan Kaadhal நீ நான் காதல்	Star Vijay	13 November 2023	384	Series	
30 April	Kalakka Povathu Yaaru? 10 கலக்க போவது யாரு? 10	Star Vijay	1 December 2024	19	Stand-up comedy show	
May
4 May	Jodi Are U Ready season 2 ஜோடி ஆர் யூ ரெடி 2	Star Vijay	25 January 2025	29	Dance show	
12 May	Sa Re Ga Ma Pa Tamil Li'l Champs 4 ச ரி க ம ப லிட்டில் சாம்பியன்ஸ் 4	Zee Tamil	2 November 2024	62	Singing show	
24 May	Punnagai Poove புன்னகை பூவே	Sun TV	6 May 2024	319	Series	
25 May	Super Singer Junior season 10 சூப்பர் சிங்கர் ஜூனியர் சீசன் 10	Star Vijay	16 November 2024	47	Singing show	
June
7 June	Ponni பொன்னி	Star Vijay	27 March 2023	663	Series	
July
19 July	Sevvanthi செவ்வந்தி	Sun TV	11 July 2022	900	Series	
20 July	Dance Jodi Dance Reloaded season 3 டான்ஸ் ஜோடி டான்ஸ் ரீலோடட் 3	Zee Tamil	26 June 2023	40	Dance show	
27 July	Bakthi Super Singer பக்தி சூப்பர் சிங்கர்	Star Vijay	31 May 2025	18	Singing show	
August
8 August	Baakiyalakshmi பாக்கியலட்சுமி	Star Vijay	27 July 2020	1469	Series	
8 August	Office ஆபீஸ்	Disney+ Hotstar	27 July 2020	100	Web-series	
10 August	Naanum Rowdy Dhaan நானும் ரவுடி தான்	Sun TV	30 March 2025	20	Reality show	
10 August	Thangamagal தங்கமகள்	Star Vijay	22 January 2024	479	Series	
23 August	Meenakshi Sundaram மீனாட்சி சுந்தரம்	Kalaignar TV	28 April 2025	102	Series	
28 August	Aadhira ஆதிரா	Astro Vinmeen	14 July 2025	28	Series	
September
2 September	Sarojini சரோஜினி	DD Tamil	14 April 2025	102	Series	
28 September	Cooku with Comali season 6 குக் வித் கோமாளி சீசன் 6	Star Vijay	4 May 2025	45	Cooking show	
October
3 October	Aaha Kalyanam ஆஹா கல்யாணம்	Star Vijay	20 March 2023	644	Series	
25 October	Ninaithale Inikkum நினைத்தாலே இனிக்கும்	Zee Tamil	23 August 2021	1417	Series	
November
1 November	Mounam Pesiyadhe மௌனம் பேசியதே	Zee Tamil	4 November 2024	303	Series	
1 November	Maari மாரி	Zee Tamil	4 July 2022	1068	Series	
22 November	Manasellam மனசெல்லம்	Zee Tamil	20 January 2025	200	Series	
December
14 December	Top Cooku Dupe Cooku season 2 டாப் குக்கு டூப் குக்கு சீசன் 2	Sun TV	17 August 2025	35	comedy cooking show	
21 December	Single Pasanga சிங்கிள் பசங்க	Zee Tamil	10 August 2025	19	Reality Show	

== Milestone episodes ==
Episode air date		Title	Tamil title	Network(s)	Episode	Ref
January	4	Kayal	கயல்	Sun TV	1000th	
January	16	Kanmani Anbudan	கண்மணி அன்புடன்	Star Vijay	100th	
January	18	Ilakkiya	இலக்கியா	Sun TV	700th	
January	23	Singapennae	சிங்கப்பெண்ணே	Sun TV	400th	
January	28	Siragadikka Aasai	சிறக்கடிக்க ஆசை	Star Vijay	600th	
February	1	Marumagal	மருமகள்	Sun TV	200th	
February	11	Pandian Stores 2	பாண்டியன் ஸ்டோர்ஸ் 2	Star Vijay	400th	
February	12	Idhayam	இதயம்	Zee Tamil	600th	
February	12	Anna	அண்ணா	Zee Tamil	600th	
February	15	Punitha	புனிதா	Sun TV	100th	
February	23	Ninaithale Inikkum	நினைத்தலே இனிக்கும்	Zee Tamil	1200th	
February	26	Malli	மல்லி	Sun TV	300th	
March	3	Mounam Pesiyadhe	மௌனம் பேசியதே	Zee Tamil	100th	
March	10	Lakshmi	இலட்சுமி	Sun TV	300th	
March	12	Pudhu Vasantham	புதுவசந்தம்	Sun TV	500th	
March	17	Chinna Marumagal	சின்ன மருமகள்	Star Vijay]	300th	
March	25	Sakthivel: Theeyaai Oru Theeraa Kaadhal	சக்திவேல்	Star Vijay	400th	
March	27	Anandha Ragam	ஆனந்தராகம்	Sun TV	800th	
March	28	Veera	வீரா	Zee Tamil	300th	
March	29	Annam	அன்னம்	Sun TV	100th	
April	11	Sandhya Raagam	சந்தியாராகம்	Zee Tamil	500th	
April	12	Moondru Mudichu	மூன்று முடிச்சு	Sun TV	200th	
April	25	Maari	மாரி	Zee Tamil	900th	
April	29	Karthigai Deepam	கார்த்திகை தீபம்	Zee Tamil	800th	

== Tamil serial remakes in other languages ==
=== Series ===
Original series	Language	Remake series	Premiere date	Channel	Ref
Marumagal	Malayalam	Aathira	20 January 2025	Surya TV	
Marumagal	Kannada	Ratha Saptami	8 December 2025	Udaya TV	
Deivamagal	Hindi	Ram Bhavan	29 January 2025	Colors TV	
Deivamagal	Kannada	Nee Iralu Joteyalli	4 August 2025	Star Suvarna	
Moondru Mudichu	Malayalam	Swayamvarapanthal	17 February 2025	Surya TV	
Moondru Mudichu	Kannada	Mangalya	2 September 2025	Udaya TV	
Moondru Mudichu	Bengali	Sohage Adore	24 November 2025	Sun Bangla	
Sundari 2	Kannada	Anupallavi	17 February 2025	Udaya TV	
Chinna Marumagal	Telugu	Bhanumathi	10 March 2025	Star Maa	
Chinna Marumagal	Kannada	Mudhdhu Sose	14 April 2025	Colors Kannada	
Chellamma	Kannada	Sharade	17 March 2025	Star Suvarna	
Chellamma	Hindi	Shehzadi... Hai Tu Dil Ki	4 December 2025	Star Plus	
Aadukalam	Kannada	Sindhu Bhairavi	7 April 2025	Udaya TV	
Singapennae	Malayalam	Chattambipaaru	7 April 2025	Surya TV	
Pandian Stores 2	Kannada	Nanda Gokula	4 June 2025	Colors Kannada	
Annam	Malayalam	Peythozhiyathe	29 June 2025	Surya TV	
Veera	Telugu	Auto Vijayashanthi	7 July 2025	Zee Telugu	
Anna	Bengali	Amader Dadamoni	7 July 2025	Zee Bangla	
Sindhu Bairavi Kacheri Arambam	Kannada	Prema Kavya	4 August 2025	Colors Kannada	
Lakshmi	Telugu	Srihari Kalyanam	22 September 2025	Gemini TV	
Mahanadhi	Kannada	Vasudeva Kutumba	15 September 2025	Star Suvarna	
Nayagi	Marathi	Nashibvan	15 September 2025	Star pravah	
Ayyanar Thunai	Kannada	Shree Gandhadagudi	6 October 2025	Colors Kannada	
Ayyanar Thunai	Malayalam	Kaatathe Kilikoodu	10 November 2025	Asianet	
Ayyanar Thunai	Telugu	Podarillu	8 December 2025	Star Maa	

== Time changing ==
Show	Channel	Moved from	Moved to	Ref
Kayal	Sun TV	25 October 2021 - 3 January 2026; Monday - Saturday 19:30	5 January 2026 - ongoing Monday - Saturday 15:00	
Anandha Ragam	Sun TV	13 May 2024 - 13 December 2025; Monday - Saturday 15:00	15 December 2025 - ongoing Monday - Saturday 11:00	
Poongatru Thirumbuma	Star Vijay	28 April 2025 - 3 October 2025; Monday - Saturday 18:00	6 October 2025 - ongoing Monday - Friday 18:00	17 November 2025 - ongoing Monday - Saturday 14:30
Dhanam	Star Vijay	17 February 2025 - 9 August 2025; Monday - Saturday 15:00	11 August 2025 - ongoing Monday - Friday 18:00	17 November 2025 - ongoing Monday - Saturday 15:00
Thendrale Mella Pesu	Star Vijay	9 June 2025 - 15 November 2025; Monday - Saturday 14:30	17 November 2025 - ongoing Monday - Saturday 15:30	
