= List of programs broadcast by Star Vijay =

Star Vijay, commonly known as Vijay TV, is an Indian Tamil language general entertainment channel which is private broadcast television network owned by Asianet Star Communications, a subsidiary of American multinational mass media corporation The Walt Disney Company.

== Current programming ==
=== Fiction series ===
Premiere date	Series
23 January 2023	Siragadikka Aasai
30 October 2023	Pandian Stores 2
22 January 2024	Chinna Marumagal
16 September 2024	Kanmani Anbudan
27 January 2025	Ayyanar Thunai
9 June 2025	Thendralle Mella Pesu
3 January 2026	Suttum Vizhi Sudare
26 January 2026	Azhagae Azhagu
27 April 2026	Thai Maaman
29 June 2026	Onna Irukka Kaththukanum
6 July 2026	Kadhal Kadhal Kadhal

=== Reality shows ===
Name	Date
Super Singer Junior 11	9 May 2026–present
Bigg Boss 10	5 September 2026–present

== Former programming ==
=== Scripted series ===
Series	Premiere date	Last Aired	Ref.
7C	2012	2013	
Aaha Kalyanam	20 March 2023	3 October 2025	
Agni Satchi	2001	2002	
Anbe Vaa	2009	2010	
Anbudan Kushi	2020	2021	
Andal Azhagar	2014	2016	
Anjali	2019	2019	
Aranmanai Kili	2018	2020	
Aval	2011	2013	
Avalum Naanum	2018	2019	
Ayutha Ezhuthu	2019	2020	
Baakiyalakshmi	27 July 2020	8 August 2025	
Bala Ganapathy	2015	2015	
Bharathi Kannamma	25 February 2019	4 February 2023	
Bharathi Kannamma 2	6 February 2023	6 August 2023	
Bharatidasan Colony	2022	2022	
Bommukutty Ammavukku	3 February 2020	5 December 2020	
Chellamma	9 May 2022	14 September 2024	
Chinna Thambi	2017	2019	
Deivam Thandha Veedu	2013	2017	
Dhanam	17 February 2025	16 May 2026	
Dharmayutham	2012	2013	
Eeramana Rojave	09 July 2018	14 August 2021	
Eeramana Rojave 2	17 January 2022	02 December 2023	
En Thozhi En Kadhali En Manaivi	2005	2007	
Idhu Oru Kadhal Kathai	2005	2005	
Kaatrin Mozhi	2019	2021	
Kaatrukkenna Veli	18 January 2021	30 September 2023	
Kadhalikka Neramillai	2007	2008	
Kalathu Veedu	2015	2016	
Kallikattu Pallikoodam	2009	2010	
Kalyanam Mudhal Kadhal Varai	2014	2017	
Kalyanamam Kalyanam	2018	2019	
Kana Kaanum Kaalangal	2006	2009	
Kanaa Kandenadi	19 January 2026	26 June 2026	
Kanmani	2004	2007	
Kanne Kalaimaane	2022	2023	
Kavyanjali	2001	2002	
Kizhakku Vaasal	7 August 2023	13 April 2024	
Lakshmi Kalyanam	2017	2017	
Madurai	2007	2009	
Magale En Marumagale	11 August 2025	13 March 2026	
Mahaangalum Adisayagalum	2014	2014	
Mahanadhi	23 January 2023	26 June 2026	
Maharani	2009	2011	
Mappillai	2016	2017	
Marumagal	2001	2002	
Modhalum Kaadhalum	24 April 2023	21 June 2024	
Mouna Raagam	2017	2020	
Mouna Raagam 2	2021	2023	
Muthazhagu	15 November 2021	5 October 2024	
Naam Iruvar Namakku Iruvar	2018	2022	
Namma Veetu Ponnu	2021	2023	
Nee Naan Kaadhal	13 November 2023	25 April 2025	
Neelakuyil	2018	2019	
Neeli	2016	2017	
Nenjam Marappathillai	2017	2019	
Ninaika Therintha Manamae	2017	2018	
Office	2013	2015	
Paavam Ganesan	2021	2022	
Pagal Nilavu	2016	2019	
Pandian Stores	1 October 2018	28 October 2023	
Panivizhum Malarvanam	24 June 2024	29 March 2025	
Payanam	2002	2003	
Pirivom Santhippom	2011	2013	
Ponmagal Vanthal	2018	2020	
Ponni	27 March 2023	7 June 2025	
Ponnukku Thanga Manasu	2018	2020	
Poongatru Thirumbuma	28 April 2025	3 January 2026	
Puthu Kavithai	2013	2015	
Raja Paarvai	2021	2021	
Raja Rani	2017	2019	
Raja Rani 2	12 October 2020	21 March 2023	
Rettai Vaal Kuruvi	2015	2015	
Roja Kootam	2009	2010	
Sakthivel: Theeyaai Oru Theeraa Kaadhal	4 December 2023	28 March 2026	
Saravanan Meenatchi	2011	2018	
Sindhu Bairavi Kacheri Arambam	20 January 2025	14 August 2026	
Senthoora Poove	2020	2022	
Siva Manasula Sakthi	2019	2020	
Sundari Neeyum Sundaran Naanum	2019	2021	
Tamil Kadavul Murugan	2017	2018	
Tayumanavan	2013	2014	
Thaenmozhi B.A	2019	2021	
Thamizhum Saraswathiyum	12 July 2021	19 April 2024	
Thangamagal	22 January 2024	10 August 2025	
Thazhampoo	2019	2019	
Thendral Vandhu Ennai Thodum	16 August 2021	11 November 2023	
Vaidhegi Kaathirundhaal	20 December 2021	23 April 2022	
Veetuku Veedu Vaasapadi	22 April 2024	15 February 2025	
Velaikaran	2020	2022	
Velammal	2021	2021	
Vinnaithandi Varuvaayaa	2016	2016	

=== Reality shows ===
- Achcham Thavir (2016)
- Anbudan DD (2017)
- Athu Ithu Ethu (2009–present)
- Bigg Boss Tamil – 9 seasons (2017–present)
- Bigg Boss Jodigal (2021–2022)
- Bigg Boss The Common Man (2026)
- Cooku with Comali – 7 seasons (2019–present)
- Comedy Raja Kalakkal Rani (2021)
- Connexion (2013–2017)
- Divided (2018)
- Enkitta Mothathe (2018–2019)
- Jodi Are U Ready (2024–present)
- Jodi Number One (2006–2019)
- Kadavul Padhi Mirugam Padhi (2008)
- Kadhanayagi (2023)
- Kalakka Povathu Yaaru? (2005–present)
- Kalakka Povathu Yaaru? Champions (2017–2022)
- Kathai Alla Nijam
- Kings of Comedy Juniors (2017–2018)
- Lollu Sabha (2003–2008)
- Mr. and Mrs. Chinnathirai (2019–2024)
- Mrs. Chinnathirai (2017–2018)
- Neengalum Vellalam Oru Kodi (2012–2016)
- Oru Vaarthai Oru Latcham (2010-2020)
- Ramar Veedu (2019)
- Oo Solriya Oo Oohm Solriya (2022–present)
- Ready Steady Po (2017–present)
- Samayal Samayal with Venkatesh Bhat (2014–2018)
- Sigaram Thotta Manithargal (2005–2006)
- Start Music Tamil (2019–present)
- Startup Singham (2025)
- Super Singer (2006–present)
- Super Singer Junior (2007–present)
- Tamil Pechu Engal Moochu (2023)
- Vasool Rani (2005)
- Villa to Village (2018)
- Murattu Singles (2021)

=== Dubbed series ===
- Adhey Kangal (2018–2020)
- Anbalae Azhagana Veedu (2011–2012)
- Chandra Nandini (2016–2017)
- Hatim (2004–2005)
- Mahabharatham (2013–2014)
- Seethaiyin Raman (2015–2016)
- Shaka Laka Boom Boom (2004–2005)

=== Discontinued Dubbed series ===
- Adhisaya Piraviyum Arpudha Pennum (09 Feb 2020-31 Aug 2020)
- Amma (03 Oct 2016–29 Jun 2017)
- Arjun (aired on Vijay Super) (26 Aug 2017–Unknown)
- Durga (aired on Vijay Super) (01 Aug 2017–08 Nov 2017)
- En Anbu Thangaikku (01 Dec 2014–09 Mar 2017)
- En Kanavan En Thozhan (29 Oct 2012–08 Mar 2017)
- Endrum Anbudan (03 Oct 2016–30 Jun 2017)
- Ennudaiya Thotathil (aired on Vijay Tv & Vijay Super) (03 Oct 2016–28 Jun 2017) (01 Aug 2017–20 Oct 2017)
- Kadhala Kadhala (aired on Vijay Tv & Vijay Super) (06 Jun 2017–17 Oct 2018)
- Kiranmala (03 Oct 2016–24 Jun 2017)
- Kuttrangal Jakkirathai (aired on Vijay Super) (31 Jul 2017–Unknown)
- Maaveeran Hatim (02 Mar 2014–30 Mar 2014)
- Mahadev (aired on Vijay Tv & Vijay Super) (03 Oct 2016–Unknown)
- Mangayin Sabatham (03 Oct 2016–26 Jun 2017)
- Maya Mohini (05 Sep 2016-Unknown)
- Minmini Pookal (aired on Vijay Super) (01 Aug 2017–20 Oct 2017)
- Radha Krishna (03 Dec 2018–22 Jun 2019)
- Sai Baba (27 Aug 2020-13 Oct 2020)
- Shivam (02 Jul 2012–11 Apr 2014)
- Suhasini (aired on Vijay Super) (09 Oct 2017–12 Mar 2018)
- Uravugal Thodarkathai (aired on Vijay Tv & Vijay Super) (30 Mar 2011–14 Aug 2015) (01 Aug 2017–20 Oct 2017)
