= Meenakshi Sundaram (TV series) =

- Genre: Family; Drama
- Screenplay by: C.U Muthuselvam; R. Tharmalingam (dialogues)
- Story by: P. Jaikumar
- Directed by: P. Pazhanivel
- Starring: Shobanaa Uthaman; S. Ve. Shekher
- Theme music composer: Visu
- Composer: Visu
- Country of origin: India
- Original language: Tamil
- No. of seasons: 1
- No. of episodes: 102

Production
- Executive producer: Deepan Shankar
- Production location: Tamil Nadu
- Editor: Arun
- Camera setup: Multi-Camera
- Running time: approx. 22–24 minutes per episode
- Production company: Flamingo Entertainment

Original release
- Network: Kalaignar TV
- Release: 28 April – 23 August 2025

Meenakshi Sundaram is a 2025 Indian Tamil-language Family drama television series written by P. Jaikumar, directed by P. Pazhanivel, and starring Shobanaa Uthaman and S. Ve. Shekher. The series is about a 70-year-old man who marries a 30-year-old woman by chance.

It aired on Kalaignar TV from April 28, 2025, to August 23, 2025, every Monday and Saturday. It is also available for streaming on Kalaignar TV YouTube channel. The series was premiered along with Star Vijay's Poongatru Thirumbuma. Shobanaa Uthaman has played the female lead in this series as well.

== Cast ==
=== Main ===
- S. Ve. Shekher as Sundaram
- Shobanaa Uthaman as Meenakshi

=== Supporting ===
- Uma Riyaz Khan
- Ajay Rathnam
- Gayathri
- Bharath Kalyan
- P. R. Varalakshmi / Shanthi Williams
- Reshma
- Riya Thikogram
- Meenakshi Muruha
- Jeffrin
- Sabrishvaran
- Udumalairavi
- Ganapathy
- Stev
- Madhumathi
- Master. Rithiki
- Pulipandi
- Manikandan
- Vijayaraj

== Production ==
=== Casting ===
Veteran actor S. Ve. Shekher was cast as Sundaram and this series made the mark comeback of Shekhar after twenty five years hiatus on Television.

== Cancelled ==
The series started with a lot of expectations, because the story of the series, a 70-year-old man who marries a 30-year-old woman. In August, Kalaignar TV confirmed that the show had gone off-air as the makers were not happy with the story line, screenplay and Actor Shekhar saying, "The true story of this serial, whether the heroine will get married or not, has not been told. They said 'fake marriage'." Instead of continuing with the show, they decided to end it and focus on their new show.
