= Magale En Marumagale =

- Genre: Drama
- Based on: Maguva O Maguva
- Written by: Vaspuli; Sargunam Pungaraj
- Screenplay by: Sargunam Pungaraj
- Directed by: R. D. Narayanamoorthy; Haris Athitya
- Starring: Varshini Suresh; Reshma Pasupuleti; Avinash Ashok
- Theme music composer: Kaleeswaran
- Country of origin: India
- Original language: Tamil
- No. of seasons: 1
- No. of episodes: 162

Production
- Executive producers: Gautham Balasubramanian; Vijay Chandran
- Producer: K. Thirugnanam
- Production location: Tamil Nadu
- Cinematography: C. Sivan Ilaiyaraja
- Editor: Venkatesh
- Camera setup: Multi-Camera
- Running time: approx. 22–24 minutes per episode
- Production company: Kala Communications

Original release
- Network: Star Vijay
- Release: 11 August 2025 – 13 March 2026

Magale En Marumagale (transl. Daughter My daughter-in-law) is an Indian Tamil-language drama television series starring Varshini Suresh with Reshma Pasupuleti and Avinash Ashok. The show is an official remake of Star Maa's Telugu language series Maguva O Maguva.

The series explores the complex relationship between a mother-in-law and daughter-in-law, set against the backdrop of family dynamics and traditions. It is produced by K. Thirugnanam under the banner of Kala Communications and directed by R. D. Narayanamoorthy (in his last series before his death) and Haris Athitya. It premiered on Star Vijay on 11 August 2025 and ended on 13 March 2026 and is also available on the digital platform JioHotstar.

== Cast ==
=== Main ===
- Varshini Suresh as Thulasi (Ammu)
- Reshma Pasupuleti as Abirami Naachiyaar
- Avinash Ashok as Chinnathambi

=== Recurring ===
- Pondy Ravi as Paranjothi
- Harsha Nair as Sivagami (Main Antagonist)
- Surjith Ansary as Pandi Durai
- VJ Sriya Surendran as Soodamani
- Sachin Murugesan as Karthick
- Archana Mariyappan as Shenbagam
- Geetha Narayanan as Gomathi
- David Solomon Raja as Gunasekaran
- CN Ravishankar as Bhoopathi
- VJ Nisha as Sathya
- Kiruba as Thayamma
- Gayathri Sri as Divya (fake Ammu)
- Pranav Mohanan as Naveen
- Divyadarshani

=== Special appearance ===
- Navin Kumar as Muthuvel (Dead)

== Production ==
=== Development ===
It is an adaptation of Star Maa's Telugu language series Maguva O Maguva. The series is directed by R. D. Narayanamoorthy, known for his films like Manadhai Thirudivittai (2001) and he helmed Tamil television soap operas such as Anbe Vaa. This is his last series before his death. From October, he was replaced by actor and director Haris Athitya.

=== Casting ===
Nee Naan Kaadhal fame Varshini Suresh was cast in the female lead role as Thulasi. Actor Navin Kumar plays an extended special appearance as Muthuvel. Actor Avinash Ashok was cast in the male lead role as Chinnathambi. Baakiyalakshmi fame Reshma Pasupuleti was cast as Muthuvel's mother Naachiyaar.

=== Release ===
On 7 July 2025, the first Launch promo was released, giving a brief insight into Naachiyaar and Thulasi's life as well as the first interaction and revealing the plot through a minute song. The second promo was released on 24 July 2025, featuring Chinnathambi interaction.

The show started airing on Star Vijay on 11 August 2025 on Monday to Saturday at 15:00, replacing Dhanam’s time slot.

== Broadcast history ==
It began airing on Star Vijay on 11 August 2025 from Monday to Saturday at 15:00 (IST). Starting on 17 November 2025, it shifted to the evening slot at 18:00 (IST), replacing Poongatru Thirumbuma’s time slot.
