= Madurai Paiyanum Chennai Ponnum =

Tamil romantic web series

- Original title: மதுரை பையனும் சென்னை பெண்ணும்
- Genre: Romantic comedy
- Directed by: Vignesh Pazhanivel
- Starring: Kanna Ravi; VJ Angelin
- Music by: Saachin Raj
- Country of origin: India
- Original language: Tamil
- No. of seasons: 1
- No. of episodes: 25

Production
- Producer: Sanjay
- Cinematography: Murugesh Veera
- Running time: 21–24 minutes per episode
- Production company: Auhom Pictures

Original release
- Network: Aha Tamil
- Release: 14 February – 8 May 2025

Madurai Paiyanum Chennai Ponnum (transl. Madurai boy and Chennai girl) is a 2025 Indian Tamil-language Romantic comedy streaming television series directed by Vignesh Pazhanivel for Aha Tamil. The series starring Kanna Ravi and VJ Angelin in lead role. It is produced by Sanjay under the banner of Auhom Pictures.

The series depicts the love story of the cultural and personal differences between a Madurai boy and a Chennai girl. It premiered on Aha Tamil on 14 February 2025 and consists of 25 episodes.

== Cast ==
- Kanna Ravi as Subash
- VJ Angelin as Jenny
- Renuka
- Mohamed Kuraishi
- Shiyara Sharmi
- Rahul Raymond

== Development ==
=== Production ===
The series is produced by Sanjay under the banner of Auhom Pictures. It is the 14th Tamil series for Aha Tamil. The show directed by Vignesh Pazhanivel and music by Saachin Raj.

=== Casting ===
Actor Kanna Ravi, known for his roles in Mandela and Lover, plays the male lead as Subash, while Startup Singam fame VJ Angelin, makes her acting debut as the female lead.

=== Release ===
The series was scheduled for a worldwide release on 14 February 2025 Valentine's Day, on Aha Tamil.
