= Bakthi Super Singer =

- Genre: Music competition; Reality; Talent show
- Presented by: Anuradha Sriram; Akshatha Das
- Judges: Mahathi; T. L. Maharajan; Pushpavanam Kuppusamy
- Country of origin: India
- Original language: Tamil
- No. of seasons: 1

Production
- Production locations: Chennai, Tamil Nadu
- Running time: approx.60-70 minutes per episode

Original release
- Network: Star Vijay; Disney+ Hotstar
- Release: 31 May – 27 July 2025

Related
- Super Singer

Bakthi Super Singer is a 2025 Indian Tamil-language reality television devotional singing competition show, which aired on Star Vijay. The show is part of Super Singer and focus exclusively on Tamil devotional songs, bringing spiritual music to television screens across Tamil Nadu.

Anuradha Sriram and Akshatha Das were hosts of the show which was judged by Mahathi, T. L. Maharajan and Pushpavanam Kuppusamy are the judges of the show. The show has 12 singers. The show was aired from 31 May to 27 July 2025 and ended with 18 Episodes.

The Grand Finale was held on 26 July and 27 July 2025 on Saturday and Sunday at 18:30. The show was won by Shravan Narayan, while Alaina Sajith emerged as the first runner up of the show.

== Judges ==
Judges	Description	Ref
Mahathi	She is an Carnatic musician and playback singer for film songs in Tamil and Telugu languages.	
T. L. Maharajan	He is a Tamil classical and Tamil playback singer.	
Pushpavanam Kuppusamy	He is a Tamil folk singer, playback singer, lyricist, writer and music composer.	

== Host ==
Judges	Description	Ref
Anuradha Sriram	She is an Indian carnatic and playback singer and child actress who hails from the Indian state of Tamil Nadu.	
Akshatha Das	She is an Indian model and television anchor.	

== Contestants ==
#	Name	Sautes	Ref
1	Shravan Narayan	Winner	
2	Alaina Sajith	Runner-up	
3	Karthik Narayanan	2nd Runner-up	
4	Pavithra	2nd Runner-up	
5	Akila Ravindran	3rd runner-up	
6	Moushmi	4th runner-up	
7	Devakottai Abirami	Evicted	
8	Gopika	Evicted	
9	Shruthi Hareesh	Evicted	
10	Tejaswini Krishnaswamy	Evicted	
11	Vigneshvaran	Evicted	
12	Yamini Srinivasan	Evicted	

== Episodes ==
Week	Episodes	Airing	Round	Notes
1	1	31 May 2025	Grand Launch	
1	2	1 June 2025	Grand Launch	
2	3	7 June 2025	Isai Thiruvizha	
2	4	8 June 2025	Isai Thiruvizha	
3	5	14 June 2025	Legends Hits Round	Carnatic musician Nithyasree Mahadevan as Special Judge
3	6	15 June 2025	Legends Hits Round	Carnatic musician Nithyasree Mahadevan as Special Judge
4	7	21 June 2025	Amman Bakthi Songs	
4	8	22 June 2025	Amman Bakthi Songs	
5	9	28 June 2025	Mrugan Bakthi Songs	
5	10	29 June 2025	Mrugan Bakthi Songs	
6	11	5 July 2025	Thiruthalam Bakthi Song Round	
6	12	6 July 2025	Thiruthalam Bakthi Song Round	
7	13	12 July 2025	Ishda Deiva Bakthi Song Round	
7	14	13 July 2025	Ishda Deiva Bakthi Song Round	
8	15	19 July 2025	Semi Final Round	
8	16	20 July 2025	Semi Final Round	
9	17	26 July 2025	Grand Finale	
9	18	27 July 2025	Grand Finale	
