= Sindhu Bairavi Kacheri Arambam =

- Genre: Romantic drama
- Written by: Sahul Priyadharshini Shajagan
- Screenplay by: Sahul Priyadharshini Shajagan
- Directed by: Francis Kathiravan
- Starring: Pavithra B. Naik; Dhiraviam Rajakumaran; Aarthi Subash; Anandha Krishnan
- Theme music composer: Ilayavan
- Country of origin: India
- Original language: Tamil
- No. of seasons: 1
- No. of episodes: 410

Production
- Producer: Rajavelu
- Production location: Tamil Nadu
- Cinematography: Ramesh Durai
- Editor: S. K. Abdul Suhel
- Camera setup: Multi-Camera
- Running time: approx. 22–24 minutes per episode
- Production company: A Tele Factory

Original release
- Network: Star Vijay
- Release: 20 January 2025 – 14 August 2026

Sindhu Bairavi Kacheri Arambam (transl. Sindhu Bairavi Performance Begins) is a 2025 Indian Tamil-language romantic drama television series starring Pavithra B. Naik, alongside Dhiraviam Rajakumaran, Aarthi Subash and Anandha Krishnan. The series is produced by Rajavelu under the banner of A Tele Factory. It premiered on Star Vijay from 20 January 2025 and ended on 14 August 2026. It is also available on the digital platform JioHotstar. The show is also dubbed into Malayalam as Sindhu Bhairavi on Asianet from 8 June to 1 October 2026.

== Plot ==
The series follows the story of two sisters, Sindhu and Bairavi. Sindhu falls in love with Siva, who initially rejects her, yet circumstances force them into marriage. On the wedding day, Sindhu deceives Siva into completing the marriage ceremony, while Bairavi is compelled to marry Aarumugam for the sake of family honor. The narrative explores the lives of these four individuals as they navigate marriages entered into against their will.

== Cast ==
=== Main ===
- Pavithra B. Naik as Sindhu Siva: Siva's wife and love interest and Bairavi's sister.
- Dhiraviam Rajakumaran as Dr. Siva: Sindhu's husband and love interest, Mahalakshmi's son, and Sneha's ex lover.
- Aarthi Subash as Bairavi Aarumugam: Aarumugam's wife and love interest and Sindhu's sister, Sanjay's one sided obsession.
- Anandha Krishnan as Aarumugam: Bairavi's husband and love interest, Annapoorani's son, and Gayathri's brother.

=== Recurring ===
- Sumalatha Madhan as Annapoorani: Mahalakshmi and Isacci's sister; Aarumugam and Gayathri's mother
- Gaayathri Krishnan → Neepa Siva as Mahalakshmi: Annapoorani and Isakki's Co-sister,Siva and Aishu's mother
- Ramesh as Vasudevan: Siva and Aishu's father
- Sahana Shetty as Gayathri; Isacci's wife, Annapoorani's daughter, Aarumugam's sister.
- Anitha Venkat as Saradha: Sindhu and Bairavi's mother
- Jeganathan as Sathyaraj: Sindhu and Bairavi's father.
- Lailaa as Aishwariya "Aishu": Mahalakshmi's daughter. Siva's sister.
- Suganya Vish as Sneha: Siva's ex-lover
- Nimesh Sagar as DSP Sanjay: Bairavi's love interest
- --- as Devaraj: Sneha's father
- Praveen Devasagayam (2025) → Aron Sanjay (Oct.2025–2026) as Isacci: Gayathri's husband, Annapoorani and Mahalakshmi's brother
- Vasu Vikram as Rajakili
- Ambika as Lawyer Ambika
- Sanjay Shankar as Raghu
- --- as Devaki
- --- as Swathi

== Production ==
=== Development ===
The show was produced by Rajavelu under the banner of A Tele Factory. The series was directed by Chellamma fame Francis Kathiravan.

=== Casting ===
After Eeramana Rojave 2, Dhiraviam Rajakumaran made a comeback through this series as "Siva", whilst newcomer actress Pavithra B. Naik was cast in the female lead role of Sindhu after her notable performances in Telugu serial Nuvvu Nenu Prema. Actor Anandha Krishnan was cast in second male lead as Aarumugam, his notable performances in Sivagami. Initially, actress Raveena Daha was chosen and approached to play another female lead but after first promo release, she left resulting in Aarthi Subash to play the role as Bairavi.

Actor Praveen Devasagayam was cast as Isacci, but in October 2025, Praveen quit the series to participate in Bigg Boss Tamil season 9, so he was replaced by actor Aron Sanjay.

== Controversy ==
Actress Raveena Daha was initially selected to play the role of Bhairavi in the serial, and the first series promo of her performance was released. But she suddenly left the series for unknown reasons. Following her departure, reports emerged suggesting that she had been issued a 'red card', potentially barring her from acting in future television shows and serials. As a result, she was unable to participate in the 'Chinnathirai Nadigar Sangam' election.

== Broadcast history ==
It began airing on Star Vijay on 20 January 2025 from Monday to Friday at 22:00 (IST), replacing Naagin. Starting on 20 April 2026, it shifted to the afternoon slot at 19:00 (IST). Again, it was shifted to 6:00 PM from 20 April 2026.
