= Bigg Boss (Tamil TV series) season 9 =

2025 season of an Indian television series

Bigg Boss
- Season 9
- Season 9 eye logo
- Hosted by: Vijay Sethupathi
- No. of days: 105
- No. of housemates: 24
- Winner: Divya Ganesh
- Runner-up: R. Sabarinathan
- No. of episodes: 106

Release
- Original network: Star Vijay; JioHotstar
- Original release: 5 October 2025 – 18 January 2026

Season chronology
- ← Previous; Season 8 Next → Season 10

Bigg Boss 9 is the ninth season of the Indian Tamil-language reality television series Bigg Boss, produced by Banijay. Vijay Sethupathi is returning as a host for the second time in a row. The season premiered on 5 October 2025 on Star Vijay and JioHotstar. Unseen episodes this seasons will be aired on Colors Tamil.

The Grand Finale of the show took place on 18 January 2026, Divya Ganesh was declared the winner, while Sabarinathan was declared as runner-up.

== Production ==
The creative team for the season includes Deepak Dhar as the project head. The show is produced by the Banijay Entertainment Group. Rupali Kanchankumar Bandawane serves as the production designer for this season.

=== Promotions ===
The official first look and logo were unveiled on 1 September 2025, confirming the season's launch with Vijay Sethupathi returning as the host.

On 5 September 2025, the second teaser was released, featuring Sethupathi emphasising the idea of "trying something new", hinting at a season filled with surprises and unpredictability. The tagline of the season was "Paakka Paakka thaan theriyum" ("You'll only know by watching").

On 13 September 2025, the season's poster, which included the launch date, was released.

=== Eye logo ===
The logo features the number nine symbolised in purple neon shades as the iris, with a silver frame.

=== Broadcast ===
The show streams 24/7 on JioHotstar, with the main daily episode broadcast on Star Vijay, reflecting a digital-first approach. An unseen episode featuring additional footage not included in the one-hour broadcast is aired on Colors Tamil.

=== Sponsors ===
Haier serves as a key sponsor for the season of Bigg Boss, providing home appliances for the house.

=== House ===
The Bigg Boss 9 house, located in EVP Film City, Chennai, features an ancient civilisation-inspired theme, primarily influenced by Egyptian and Mesopotamian architecture. The interior design incorporates walls engraved with hieroglyphic-style symbols, colossal sculpted faces reminiscent of pharaohs and deities, and ornate golden and bronze detailing that evoke the grandeur of ancient temples. Symbolic motifs such as wings, triangular emblems, and carved relics highlight the mystical and regal ambience of the space, blending historical opulence with a modern aesthetic.

- Living area: Circular sand-coloured sofa with Egyptian-style carvings.
- Kitchen and dining area: Round dining table with brown finish and white chairs.
- Bedrooms: Two separate bedrooms, including a common bedroom following the Egyptian theme with artwork and nine beds. A super deluxe bedroom with an attached bathroom and private Jacuzzi is also provided.
- Bathroom: Updated wallpapers featuring a palette inspired by ancient architecture.
- Confession room: Sand-coloured room styled like an Egyptian palace, with carvings of a mummy behind the seating area.
- Garden and outdoor area: Artificial turf, swimming pool, and lounge chairs.
- Medical room: Dedicated space for health check-ups and emergencies.
- Activity area: Located near the medical room and used for tasks and challenges.
- Smoking area: Designated space in the garden area.

This season also marks the return of the jail feature, which was absent in the previous season, and the revival of the swimming pool, which had remained empty since Season 3 and had been removed entirely after Season 7. Additionally, for the first time in the show's history, the main entrance to the house has been shifted from the garden-facing area to the location previously used as the activity area entrance.

== Housemates status ==
S.no	Housemates	Day entered	Day exited	Housemates status
1	Divya	Day 28	Day 105	Winner
2	Sabarinathan	Day 1	Day 105	1st runner-up
3	Vikram	Day 1	Day 105	2nd runner-up
4	Aurora	Day 1	Day 105	3rd runner-up
5	Sandra	Day 28	Day 98	Evicted
6	Vinoth	Day 1	Day 96	Walked with ₹17.6 Lakhs
7	Subiksha	Day 1	Day 91	Evicted
8	Kamrudin	Day 1	Day 90	Ejected
9	Parvathy	Day 1	Day 90	Ejected
10	Kani	Day 1	Day 84	Evicted
11	Amit	Day 28	Day 83	Evicted
12	Aadhirai	Day 1	Day 21	Evicted
12	Aadhirai	Day 56	Day 77	Evicted
13	FJ	Day 1	Day 77	Evicted
14	Viyana	Day 1	Day 70	Evicted
15	Ramya	Day 1	Day 69	Evicted
16	Prajin	Day 28	Day 63	Evicted
17	Kemy	Day 1	Day 49	Evicted
18	Diwagar	Day 1	Day 42	Evicted
19	Praveen	Day 1	Day 35	Evicted
20	Tushaar	Day 1	Day 34	Evicted
21	Kalaiyarasan	Day 1	Day 27	Evicted
22	Apsara	Day 1	Day 14	Evicted
23	Pravin	Day 1	Day 7	Evicted
24	Nandhini	Day 1	Day 5	Walked

== Housemates ==
The list of housemates:

- T. Diwagar, YouTuber, physiotherapist.
- Aurora Sinclair, actress, model, influencer.
- Fredrick Jhonson (FJ), an actor and beat-boxer, who gained recognition through the web series Suzhal: The Vortex and the film Aranmanai 4.
- VJ Parvathy, A video jockey, supporting actress and TV personality.
- Tushaar Jayaprakash, a dancer, model and content creator.
- Kani Thiru, winner of CwC season 2 who has acted in the Tamil web series Parachute. She is the sister of Bigg Boss 2 contestant and Survivor Tamil winner Vijayalakshmi Feroz.
- Sabarinathan, an actor in the Tamil industry, who has appeared in films including Natpe Thunai, Nenjamundu Nermaiyundu Odu Raja, and acted in TV shows like Velaikkaran, Bharathi Kannamma and Ponni.
- Pravin Gandhi, an Indian film director, known for directing films such as Ratchagan and Jodi.
- Vyshali Kemkar, popularly known as (Mirchi Kemy), who featured in a Tamil reality cooking show Cooku with Comali season 5 and began her screen-debut in film and shows like 𝘊𝘪𝘯𝘥𝘦𝘳𝘦𝘭𝘭𝘢, Yatrika and Office.
- Aadhirai Soundarajan, an Indian actress, known for her roles in Tamil films and television. She gained recognition through films like Bigil, Varalaru Mukkiyam and Theerkadarishi. She is also known for a TV show Mahanadhi, airing on Star Vijay.
- Ramya Joo (Stella), a stage dancer.
- Gana Vinoth Kumar, is an Indian folk music artist.
- Viyana (Rasheeda Bhanu and Raksha), a model, actress and social media influencer
- Praveen Raj Devasagayam, a television actor and comedian, recognized for Tamil serials like Bharathi Kannamma, Kizhakku Vaasal and Eeramana Rojave.
- Subiksha Kumar, a social media influencer and YouTube blogger known for her blogs on fishing and marine life.
- Apsara CJ, a Tamil transgender model and social media influencer from Kanyakumari.
- Nandhini R, a yoga teacher
- Vikkals Vikram, a stand-up comedian, actor and content creator.
- Kamrudin K, an Indian actor who appears in the Tamil television serial Mahanadhi.
- Kalaiyarasan, an Indian cultural trainer.

=== Wildcard entrants ===
- Prajean Padmanabhan, an actor known for his role in the serial Chinna Thambi and films such as Muthirai, Manal Nagaram and Ninaivellam Neeyada.
- Sandra Amy, an ex actress known for her role in the serial Thangam, and films such as 6, Dharani and Kaatrin Mozhi.
- Divya Ganesh, a television actress known for her roles in serials such as Sumangali, Baakiyalakshmi, 𝘔𝘢𝘩𝘢𝘯𝘢𝘥𝘩𝘪, 𝘊𝘩𝘦𝘭𝘭𝘢𝘮𝘮𝘢 and Annam.
- Amit Bhargav, an actor known for his role as the Hindu deity Krishna in the show Mahabharatham as-well as other shows such as Kalyanam Mudhal Kadhal Varai, Heart Beat and Nenjam Marappathillai.

== Twists ==
=== Badge selection ===
Upon entering the house on launch day, housemates will be able to pick a badge from the fire or water column. This selection will decide their bedroom allotment.

=== Bedroom allotment ===
The 2 bedrooms are depicted as 2 different statues within the one house resembling a common bedroom while the other bedroom is a deluxe bedroom. While there is also separate exclusive bedroom for the house captain is also established. The bedrooms are:

- Common bedroom: With a set of 9 beds and a separate attached room and bed located for the house captain, the room's serves as a standard room with combination of sand and Egyptian themed designs.
- Deluxe bedroom: This room is surrounded by neon lighting of black, blue and purple creating a luxurious atmosphere. The room has comfortable beds and an attached spacious and high class toilet with gold finish and a personal Jacuzzi for the housemates in the room only.
- Captain bedroom: An exclusive personal room has been designated for the house captain for this season. Hence the house captain will have his/her own bedroom in the house neither sharing a common or deluxe room.

- BB Jail: The weak performers of the week will be sent to BB Jail.

Allotment	Launch Day																																					
Allotment	Launch Day	Day 2	Day 5	Day 8	Day 11	Day 12	Day 15	Day 19	Day 21	Day 22	Day 25	Day 28	Day 29	Day 33	Day 34	Day 35	Day 40	Day 42	Day 47	Day 49	Day 54	Day 56	Day 60	Day 61	Day 63	Day 68	Day 69	Day 70	Day 75	Day 77	Day 83	Day 84	Day 90	Day 91	Day 93	Day 96	Day 98	Day 105
Divya Ganesh	Not in House											Entered (Day 28)	Bigg Boss House					Jail	Bigg Boss House				Jail	Bigg Boss House														Winner (Day 105)
Sabarinathan	Common Room						Deluxe Room						Bigg Boss House									Jail	Bigg Boss House															1st Runner-up (Day 105)
Vikkals Vikram	Common Room												Bigg Boss House																									2nd Runner-up (Day 105)
Aurora Sinclair	Deluxe Room			Common room		Jail	Common room						Bedroom allotment stopped	Bigg Boss House																								3rd Runner-up (Day 105)
Sandra Amy	Not in House											Entered (Day 28)	Bedroom allotment stopped	Jail	Bigg Boss House				Jail	Bigg Boss House									Jail	Bigg Boss House							Evicted (Day 98)	
Gana Vinoth	Deluxe Room		Jail	Deluxe Room									Bedroom allotment stopped	Bigg Boss House							Jail	Bigg Boss House														Walked with cash box (Day 96)		
Subiksha Kumar	Deluxe Room									Common Room			Bedroom allotment stopped	Bigg Boss House																				Evicted (Day 91)				
Kamrudin	Deluxe Room			Common Room				Jail	Common Room				Bedroom allotment stopped	Bigg Boss House																			Ejected (Day 90)					
VJ Paaru	Common Room			Deluxe Room			Common Room	Jail	Common Room				Bedroom allotment stopped	Bigg Boss House			Jail	Bigg Boss House															Ejected (Day 90)					
Kani Thiru	Common Room						Captain Room			Deluxe Room			Bedroom allotment stopped	Bigg Boss House			Jail	Bigg Boss House														Evicted (Day 84)						
Amit Bhargav	Not in House											Entered (Day 28)	Bedroom allotment stopped	Bigg Boss House																	Evicted (Day 83)							
Aadhirai	Common Room			Deluxe Room		Jail	Deluxe Room		Evicted (Day 21)				Bedroom allotment stopped	Evicted (Day 21)								Re-Entered (Day 56)	Bigg Boss House							Evicted (Day 77)								
FJ	Common Room						Deluxe Room						Bedroom allotment stopped	Jail	Bigg Boss House		Jail	Bigg Boss House			Jail	Bigg Boss House								Evicted (Day 77)								
Viyana	Common Room	Deluxe Room	Jail	Deluxe Room			Common Room						Bedroom allotment stopped	Bigg Boss House														Evicted (Day 70)										
Ramya Joo	Deluxe Room												Bedroom allotment stopped	Bigg Boss House												Jail	Evicted (Day 69)											
Prajean	Not in House											Entered (Day 28)	Bedroom allotment stopped	Bigg Boss House											Evicted (Day 63)													
Kemy	Common Room												Bedroom allotment stopped	Bigg Boss House						Evicted (Day 49)																		
Watermelon Star (Diwagar)	Common Room		Deluxe Room										Bedroom allotment stopped	Bigg Boss House			Jail	Evicted (Day 42)																				
Praveen Raj Dev	Common Room									Captain Room			Bedroom allotment stopped	Bigg Boss House		Evicted (Day 35)																						
Tushaar	Deluxe Room	Common Room	Captain Room	Common Room									Bedroom allotment stopped	Bigg Boss House	Evicted (Day 34)																							
Kalaiyarasan	Common Room									Deluxe Room		Evicted (Day 27)	Bedroom allotment stopped	Evicted (Day 27)																								
Apsara CJ	Common Room						Evicted (Day 14)						Bedroom allotment stopped	Evicted (Day 14)																								
Pravin Gandhi	Deluxe Room			Evicted (Day 7)									Bedroom allotment stopped	Evicted (Day 7)																								
Nandhini R	Common Room		Walked (Day 5)										Bedroom allotment stopped	Walked (Day 5)																								

=== Secret task ===
In Week 5, Sandra was assigned a secret task that required Sandra to select a partner. Upon successful completion of the task, the pair were awarded two advantages: a nomination-free pass for one of them and a special power allowing them to directly nominate a housemate for eviction. Prajean used the nomination-free pass to secure his safety, and together they exercised the special power to directly nominate Subiksha for the Week 6 eviction.

=== Maruti Suzuki eviction task ===
- On Day 49, nominated housemates Kemy and Prajean who were in the eviction hot seat were given a Maruti Suzuki car each for them to get into and both cars will leave the house, however only one car with the saved housemate will return to the house while the other won't return.

Housemate	Result
Kemy	Evicted
Prajean	Saved

=== Double ejection (red card) ===
In the last task of the ticket to finale, the car task, Kamrudin and VJ Parvathy pushed Sandra Amy out of the car by using their legs. Sandra Amy allegedly suffered a panic attack and needed medical attention. For the reasons, both VJ Parvathy and Kamrudin were given a red card each and were ejected from the house on day 90. This was the first time a double red card had happened on Bigg Boss.

== Guest appearances ==
Guest Appearances in Bigg Boss season 9 Tamil are mentioned below.

Week	Day	Guest(s)	Purpose of visit
Week 1	Grand Launch	Riya Thiyagarajan, Agathiyan, Aishwarya Appaya, Vikkals crew (Hari Muniyappan,Sibi Jayakumar and Vikram's wife)	To support the contestants Aurora, Kani, Praveen Raj, and Vikram, respectively.
Week 3	Day 15	Dhruv Vikram, Anupama Parameswaran, Rajisha Vijayan, Nivas K. Prasanna, Aruvi Madhan	As a part of Diwali celebrations, and to promote their film Bison Kaalamaadan.
Week 4	Day 24	Rio Raj, RJ Vigneshkanth, Malavika Manoj	To promote their film Aan Paavam Pollathathu.
Week 4	Day 28	Rithika Tamil Selvi, Sriranjani Sundaram	To support the wildcard contestants Divya and Amit respectively.
Week 5	Day 30-33	Priyanka Deshpande, Deepak Dinkar and Manjari Narayanan (Ex- Contestants)	As a part of the hotel task.
Week 5	Day 32	Mano	To promote the upcoming film Vattakhanal.
Week 5	Day 35	Deepak Dinkar	To interact with the housemates.
Week 7	Day 43	Surya Sethupathi, Shiv, SK Surya, Sahana Sundar, Mukesh MK, Terance Evers, Jeeva Balachandran, Madhu Vasanth, Kishore, Dominic Donald	To promote web series Nadu Center.
Week 7	Day 46	Poornima Ravi	To promote the film Yellow
Week 7	Day 47	Kavin	To promote the film Mask
Week 8	Day 50	Shalini, Sriranjani Sundaram, Riya Thiyagarajan, Rithika Tamil Selvi, Arjun Manohar, Aryan, Vijayalakshmi Ahathian, Aari Arujunan, Bhavani, Sai Pramoditha, Jayashree, Vanathi, Kiran Keshav, Rekha, Raanav V C.	(Virtually) As a part of 50th day celebrations to support the contestants Parvathy, Amit, Aurora, Divya, FJ, Kamudin, Kani, Prajean, Ramya, Sabarinathan, Sandra, Subiksha, Vikram, Vinoth and Viyana respectively.
Week 8	Day 51	Keerthy Suresh	To promote the film Revolver Rita
Week 11	Day 77	Soundariya Nanjundan	To celebrate Christmas as Santa Claus on stage.
Week 12	Day 78	Family members of Sandra	As a part of the Family week.
Week 12	Day 79	Family members of Kani, Sabarinathan and Vinoth	As a part of the Family week.
Week 12	Day 80	Family members of Amit and Divya	As a part of the Family week.
Week 12	Day 81	Soundariya Nanjundan	To celebrate Christmas as Santa Claus inside Bigg Boss house.
Week 12	Day 81	Family members of Parvathy, Aurora and Kamrudin	As a part of the Family week.
Week 12	Day 82	Family members of Vikram and Subiksha	As a part of the Family week.
Week 13	Day 91	Host Vijay Sethupathi	To announce the winner of TTF.
Week 14	Day 95	Vikranth	Promote web series LBW: Love Beyond Wicket
Week 14	Day 92-104	Aadhirai Soundarajan, Fredrick Johnson (FJ), Kani Thiru, Subiksha Kumar,Prajean Padmanabhan, Tushaar Jayaprakash, Amit Bhargav, Kalaiyarasan,Vyshali Kemkar(Kemy),Apsara CJ, Ramya Joo,Viyana,Pravin Gandhi, Diwagar, Praveen Raj,Gana Vinoth Kumar, Sandra Amy(All evicted contestants except Nandhini,Parvathy and Kamrudin)	For reunion with the housemates.
Week 15	Day 92-104	Aadhirai Soundarajan, Fredrick Johnson (FJ), Kani Thiru, Subiksha Kumar,Prajean Padmanabhan, Tushaar Jayaprakash, Amit Bhargav, Kalaiyarasan,Vyshali Kemkar(Kemy),Apsara CJ, Ramya Joo,Viyana,Pravin Gandhi, Diwagar, Praveen Raj,Gana Vinoth Kumar, Sandra Amy(All evicted contestants except Nandhini,Parvathy and Kamrudin)	For reunion with the housemates.
Week 15	Day 103	Kavin, Sandy	To promote their film poster Kavin 09.

== Weekly summary ==
The main events in the Bigg Boss 9 house are summarised in the table below.

Week 1	Entrances	During the grand premiere on 5 October 2025, host Vijay Sethupathi introduced 20 housemates. Diwagar, Aurora, FJ, Parvathy, Tushaar, Kani, Sabarinathan, Pravin, Kemy, Aadhirai, Ramya, Vinoth, Viyana, Praveen, Subiksha, Apasara, Nandhini, Vikram, Kamrudin and Kalaiyarasan entered the house in order.
Week 1	Twists	On Day 0, when entering the house, housemates were given the option by Vijay Sethupathi to either pick a red (fire) band or a blue (water) band on the stage. When all the housemates entered the house, Bigg Boss announced that housemates with the blue (water) band will be able to stay in the deluxe bedroom of the house in which they will enjoy facilities like a Jacuzzi, high-class shower system. Where else housemates with the red (fire) band will be staying in a common bedroom with only a simple bed area and bathroom.; On Day 0, all the housemates came to an agreement to off the supply of the main water tap in the house, hence Bigg Boss announced that there will be no water supply to the house besides the bathroom toilet flush. All the housemates will need to manage with water in a bucket until further notice.; On Day 2, housemates broke house rules. Hence as a punishment Bigg Boss announced housemates to discuss and swap one deluxe room housemate and a common room housemate to their opposites room. Housemates decided to swap Tushaar from the deluxe to the common room and Viyana from the common room to the deluxe room.
Week 1	Nominations	* On Day 1: Aadhirai, Apsara, Diwagar, Kalaiyarasan, Praveen, Pravin and Viyana were nominated for the first week's eviction process.
Week 1	House Captain	No Captain
Week 1	Tasks	On Day 1, housemates had to select a co housemate who they didn't really create a connection to with upon their entry into the house and a housemate who is unfit and not worthy to participate in show and paste a sticker on the housemate they select.; On Day 1–5, the house's water supply was cut off.; Story task: From Day 2: Housemates of the Bigg Boss House shared their past life, their sorrows, strengths, and how they achieved their dreams, with the other housemates. 2 housemates with the best stories will win a nomination free pass in one of the following weeks, and on Day 26 Kalaiyarasan and Kani were announced as winners.
Week 1	Tasks	Captaincy Tasks Captaincy task is divided into 3 tasks. Task 1: On Day 3: The task for captaincy was 'Pongudhe Pongudhe'.; Task 2: On Day 4: Housemates had only a tiny amount of water to wash some dirty jeans. Aadhirai, Praveen R and Tushaar were the top 3 who completed the task within the time frame.; Task 3: On Day 5: Aadhirai, Praveen and Tushaar had to pick a responsibility they will hold until Bigg Boss announced. Aadhirai picked a mask, Praveen picked a uniform and Tushaar picked a scaf to cover his mouth. Until the announcement of Bigg Boss they are not allowed to remove them. Housemates later had to vote and pick who out of the three candidates can perform best at captaincy. Tushaar received most votes and hence was captain for week 2.
Week 1	Jail	On Day 5, Vinoth and Viyana were sent to jail by housemates due to lack of participation in the weeks activities.
Week 1	Walked	On Day 5: Nandhini R voluntarily walked out of the Bigg Boss house after repeatedly requesting to leave the show.
Week 1	Exits	On Day 7: Pravin Gandhi was evicted after facing public votes.
Week 2
Week 2	Twists	On Day 11: Bigg Boss revoked Tushaar from his captaincy role since he wasn't able to perform and fulfil the roles of a house captain, hence as a punishment Tushaar lost his captaincy.
Week 2	Nominations	On Day 8: Apsara, Aurora, Diwagar, FJ, Kamrudin, Kemy, Parvathy, Ramya and Sabarinathan were nominated for the second week's eviction process.
Week 2	House Captain	~~Tushaar Jayaprakash~~
Week 2	Tasks	Story task: On Day 8-12: Housemates of the Bigg Boss House shared their past life, their sorrows, strengths, and how they achieved their dreams, with the other housemates. 2 housemates with the best stories will win a nomination free pass in the end of the week.; Mask Task: On day 9-11: Eighteen face masks of housemates are kept on a rack, and a "safe house" rack with seventeen slots is placed next to the house's activity area door in the garden area. When the buzzer sounds, each housemate must take a housemate's face from that object and place it in any one of those slots. Housemates are not allowed to take a mask with their face on it. They may exchange the mask they have with another, provided they abide by the exchange conditions mentioned in the specific set of rounds. The housemates who advance to the subsequent rounds must return their mask before the next round begins. The housemate whose mask fails to enter the safe house rack at the end of each round will be eliminated from this task. After a housemate is eliminated, one of the slots using the boards marked with an X sign. The number of slots will decrease with each round. The housemate whose mask is placed into the safe house at the end of the final round will win this task and will be saved from Week 3's nomination process and granted safety from eviction.; Bigg Boss Mask task: Housemates / Final position; Kamrudin / Winner; Tushaar / Eliminated in Round 13; Sabarinathan / Eliminated in Round 12; Ramya / Eliminated in Round 11; Praveen and Aadhirai / Eliminated in Round 10; Viyana / Eliminated in Round 9; Vikram / Eliminated in Round 8; Diwagar / Eliminated in Round 7; Kani and Subiksha / Eliminated in Round 6; Kalaiyarasan / Eliminated in Round 5; Aurora / Eliminated in Round 4; Vinoth / Eliminated in Round 3; Parvathy / Eliminated in Round 2; Kemy / Eliminated in Round 1; Since Kamarudin won the mask task, he was granted a special immunity to be automatically saved from nomination for the following week.
Week 2	Tasks	Captaincy Task: Kamrudin, Kani and Sabarinathan were selected to participate in the captaincy task, the task features a statue of each of the nominee. When the nominee is not looking at their statue another housemate who is against them can place a knife on their statue. The housemate with the least knife stabs will win captaincy. Kani received the least stabs and was elected house captain for week 3.
Week 2	Sponsored	On Day 12: All the housemates had to do a ramp walk dressed in the show's sponsor brand Jeyachandran Textiles where the brand offered all the housemates an outfit to be dressed during the ramp walk show.; Aadhirai and FJ won the task.
Week 2	Jail	On Day 12: Aadhirai and Aurora were sent to jail by housemates due to lack of participation in the weeks activities.
Week 2	Exits	On Day 14: Apsara CJ was evicted after facing public votes.
Week 3
Week 3	Twists	Host Vijay Sethupathi announced to the audience that there will be wildcard housemates entering the house soon.
Week 3	Nominations	On Day 15: Aadhirai, Aurora, Kalaiyarasan, Praveen, Ramya, Subiksha, Tushaar and Viyana were nominated for the third week's eviction process.
Week 3	House Captain	Kani Thiru
Week 3	Tasks	Bigg Boss Juice Factory: On Days 16–19: Housemates will be divided into 3 separate groups. The owners group will need to be able to export the juices to Bigg Boss. The packet boxes will be sent to the owners and the bottle collectors for the juice will be able to clean the bottles and supply the bottles to the owners. If the owners are fulfilled with the quality of the bottles they are able to purchase the bottles and fill their juice in the bottle and paste their brand on the juice. There will be 2 juice judges who will judge the owners juice base on appearance, taste and quality. If the juices are approved they earn a point.; Diwagar and Parvathy were appointed as the Quality Control judges for this task.; Owners / Coins received; Aadhirai / 14; FJ / 9; Ramya / 14; Sabarinathan / 6; Subiksha / 30; Vinoth / 10; Since Subiksha received the most coins and eventually won the task, she was granted nomination free-pass from 4th weeks eviction process. On the supplier team from the common bedroom team Praveen received most coins hence he was also granted nomination free-pass from 4th weeks eviction process
Week 3	Sponsored	Dazller Glow Challenge: On Day 19: Housemates had to get into 3 groups of 4 and the remaining 3 housemates will be the judges. Housemates will need to apply the Dazller products and perform an advertisement kind modelling shoot and a ramp walk along the stage. 1 member from each group will need to talk about the type of make-up look is performed on the members.; Kalaiarasan, Kani and Ramya were appointed as the judges for the challenge.; Aurora, FJ, Vikram and Vinoth won the challenge.
Week 3	Jail	On Day 19: Parvathy and Kamrudin were sent to jail by housemates due to lack of participation in the weeks activities.
Week 3	Exits	On Day 21: Aadhirai Soundarajan was evicted after facing public votes.
Week 4
Week 4	Entrances	On Day 28, Amit, Divya, Prajean and Sandra entered the house as wildcard housemates.
Week 4	Twists	On Day 22, Bigg Boss announced to Praveen that since he became the house captain and have the power of nomination free pass which he received in the Bigg Boss Juice Factory task. That he can only select 1 of these 2 options while the unchosen option will be passed on to someone of Praveen's choice. Hence Praveen chose to remain as the house captain for the week and granted the nomination free pass power to Kani.; On Day 22, Bigg Boss announced that all housemates will need to pack all their belongings which include clothes (except undergarments), make-up, hair products, soap, toothpaste and brush and accessories. And packed up in a luggage and left in the store room, housemates were then given a Bigg Boss uniform as a punishment.
Week 4	Nominations	On Day 22: Aurora, Kamrudin, Kalaiyarasan, Parvathy and Vinoth were nominated for the fourth week's eviction process.
Week 4	House Captain	Praveen Raj Dev
Week 4	Tasks	Captaincy Task: Kani, Praveen and Vikram were selected to participate in the captaincy task, the task features a ski board with velcro shoes attached to the board. Nominees should attach their feet on the velcro and start walking around, however they can't sit or stand still on the board. The nominee who survives the longest on the board and eliminating their co nominees will become captain of the week. Praveen was the last nominee standing and hence was elected house captain for week 4.
Week 4	Tasks	Art and the Artist: On Day 22, Team deluxe room and Bigg Boss common room housemates will split into 2 of their respective teams. In each team there should be 7 housemates and both teams should play their games at the same time. There is a total of 5 rounds, on the TV there will be a symbol shown to the housemates and housemates on both teams will need to recreate the symbols on the floor. If the team who creates the symbol within the time frame and most accurately depicted will earn a point. If team deluxe wins the house won't go through a swap, however if the common room wins the house will go through a swap. Praveen was the judge of the task.; Task Points: Teams / Total Points; Deluxe Room / 1; Common Room / 3; Team Common Room won the task. Hence there will be house swap.
Week 4	Tasks	Redemption: On Days 23–26, Housemates will participate in activities to win back their belongings which have been taken by Bigg Boss. Housemates will be divided into their respective teams of common room and deluxe room. The team which win most activities each round will be able to take certain belongings from the locker.; Deluxe team won activity 1; Common team won activity 2; Common team won activity 3
Week 4	Exits	On Day 28: Kalaiyarasan was evicted after facing public votes.
Week 5
Week 5	Twists	On Day 29, instead of the normal nomination process which is held private in the confession room. Bigg Boss asked the housemates to openly announce their nomination votes in an "open nomination".; On Days 34 & 35, there were double evictions.
Week 5	Nominations	On Day 29: Diwagar, FJ, Kamrudin, Kemy, Parvathy, Praveen, Ramya, Sabarinathan, Tushaar, Vikram, Vinoth and Viyana were nominated for the fifth week's eviction process.
Week 5	House Captain	Divya Ganesh
Week 5	Tasks	Captaincy Task: Bigg Boss announced that in this captaincy task the wildcard housemates will only be participating which include Amit, Divya, Prajean and Sandra. The task includes a hoop next to them with a rope attached to it and they will need to reach out to the middle where a ball is placed, the first nominee to pull the ball to their square in front of them wins the captaincy.; Divya won the task.
Week 5	Tasks	Aahaa Oohoo Hotel: On Day 30, housemates take roles as hotel staff and will accommodate guests sent by Bigg Boss who are previous season housemates. Bigg Boss selected the candidates for the roles of the manager, chefs, room service, and housekeepers to look after the customers visiting the hotel.; Guest / Day Checked In / Day Checked Out; Deepak Dinkar / Day 30 / Day 33; Manjari Narayanan / Day 30 / Day 33; Priyanka Deshpande / Day 30 Day 31 (Night) / Day 31(Morning) Day 33; On Day 31, Priyanka checked out of the hotel due to some circumstances and re checked in on Day 31 Night.
Week 5	Sponsored	Healthy Grocer Perugayam: On Day 33, housemates participated in the healthy grocer perugayam task. The task requires housemates to choose a co housemate who they have developed a strong connection and bond too in the house.
Week 5	Exits	On Days 34 and 35: Tushaar Jayaprakash and Praveen Raj Devasagayam were evicted in double eviction after facing public votes.
Week 6
Week 6	Twists	—N/a
Week 6	Nominations	On Day 36: Aurora, Divya, Diwagar, Kani, Parvathy, Ramya, Sandra, Subiksha, Vikram and Viyana were nominated for the sixth week's eviction process.
Week 6	House Captain	Sabarinathan
Week 6	Tasks	Captaincy Task: On Day 36, the captaincy task took place with Divya, Parvathy and Sabarinathan as the nominees in the garden area. The task's layout is that there will be 4 cones in a squared box in the middle and nominees will have a box of their own in a distance where they are stood and once the buzzer goes they must run to take the cones that is in the middle box. However, if another nominee has taken the cones and placed it in their box they can run straight to their co nominees box and try to take one. The nominee with the most cones at the final buzzer wins the captaincy. Sabarinathan received most cones at the final buzzer hence he became the captain for the sixth week.
Week 6	Tasks	Bigg Boss Samrajiyam: On Days 37–40, the housemates will be in a royal kingdom. Hence they themselves will also occupy roles of royals. Housemates will divide into 2 separate kingdom and will have a rivalry among themselves. Each kingdom will have a raja and other royal roles.; Gaana Samrajiyam: Role / Housemate; Raja / Vinoth; Raja Mandri / Kamrudin; Raja Guru / Divya; Thalapathy / Prajean; Puzhavar / Vikram; Kingdom Dancer / Ramya; Servants / Amit & Kemy; Tharpees Samrajiyam: Role / Housemate; Raja / Diwagar; Raja Mata / Kani; Illavarasi 1 / Parvathy; Illavarasi 2 / Aurora; Illavarasi 3 / Viyana; Thalapathy / Sandra; King Servant / Sabarinathan; Servants / FJ & Subiksha
Week 6	Tasks	Ranking task: On Day 39, Bigg Boss assigned housemates to select three judges among them and let the judges rank all of the housemates from 1 to 14, based on how mature they believe they have been throughout Weeks 1 to 6.; Rank / Contestants; 1 / Sabarinathan; 2 / Subiksha; 3 / Kemy; 4 / Sandra; 5 / Prajean; 6 / Viyana; 7 / Aurora; 8 / Ramya; 9 / Divya; 10 / Kamrudin; 11 / Vinoth; 12 / FJ; 13 / Parvathy; 14 / Diwagar; Judges: Amit, Kani and Vikram; FJ, Parvathy and Diwagar who were ranked in 12th, 13th and 14th positions respectively were sent to the Bigg Boss Jail following Bigg Boss's announcement.
Week 6	Sponsored	—N/a
Week 6	Exits	On Day 42: T. Diwagar was evicted after facing public votes.
Week 7
Week 7	Twists	On Day 43, Bigg Boss conducted a Freeze Nomination. this resulted in the housemates announcing their nomination in public without being allowed to move while announcing their nomination.
Week 7	Nominations	On Day 43, Amit, Aurora, Divya, Kani, Kemy, Parvathy, Prajean, Ramya, Sabarinathan, Sandra, Subiksha, Vikram and Viyana were nominated for the seventh week's eviction process.
Week 7	House Captain	FJ
Week 7	Tasks	Captaincy Task: Nominees will need to be attached to a board and only have 4 grips on the board for support. If all the grips are taken away from them they will be eliminated, however their co housemates who are not in the task will remove a grip from them with who they feel won't be suitable for a captain. FJ had the least grips removed hence he won the captaincy task.
Week 7	Tasks	Sooru Soapu Mopu: On Days 44–46, the housemates will be divided into 3 teams, Kitchen team (sambar squad), cleaning team (mop maayavi's) and washroom team (flush fighters).; Kitchen Team: They required to cook and clean after their vessels after done and which ever housemates desire any type of meal and drinks members within that team will need to do that dish they will need to entertain housemates while they are eating their meals.; Cleaning Team: This team will need to entertain housemates while they are cleaning the house and bedrooms.; Washroom Team: Whichever housemate desires to go to the washroom they are required to ring a bell on the desk of the leader of washroom fighters and then they will be greeted by a red carpet to the washroom area and entertain housemates while in the washroom area.; Teams / Housemates / Points; Kitchen Team (Sambar Squad) / Kani, Parvathy, Sandra, Divya and Viyana / 7; Cleaning Team (Mop Maayavi's) / Subiksha, Vikram, Prajean, Kemy and Kamrudin / 16; Washroom Team (Flush Fighters) / Sabarinathan, Ramya, Aurora, Vinoth, FJ and Amit / 10; Each team will be awarded scores based on their performance and the team with the most points win and will be given an opportunity for all the housemates in the team for participate in the following week's captaincy task.
Week 7	Sponsored	Maruti Suzuki Eviction Task: On Day 49, nominated housemates Kemy and Prajean who were in the eviction hot seat were given a Maruti Suzuki car each for them to get into and both cars will leave the house, however only one car with the saved housemate will return to the house while the other won't return.; Housemate / Result; Kemy / EVICTED; Prajean / SAVED
Week 7	Exits	On Day 49: Vyishali Kemkar (Kemy) was evicted after facing public votes.
Week 8
Week 8	Entrances	On Day 56, Aadhirai Soundarajan re entered the Bigg Boss house, despite the severe weather conditions in Tamil Nadu.
Week 8	Twists	—N/a
Week 8	Nominations	On Day 50, the initial nomination included Amit, Aurora, Divya, FJ, Kamrudin, Kani, Parvathy, Prajean, Ramya, Sandra, Vikram and Viyana were nominated for the eighth week's eviction process.
Week 8	House Captain	FJ
Week 8	Tasks	Captaincy Task: Nominees are required to balance all 5 rounds of tubes without falling it in a minimum time.; Set 1- Vikram and Subiksha; Set 2- Kamrudin; Set 3- Prajean and FJ: Nominees / Time Taken; FJ / 15 minutes 5 seconds; Kamrudin / 17 minutes 59 seconds; Prajean / Did not complete; Subiksha / 21 minutes 14 seconds; Vikram / Did not complete; FJ finished in balancing all rounds of tubes in minimum time, so he was exempt for this week eviction.
Week 8	Tasks	BEE-BEE Residential School: On Days 51–54, all the housemates will turn into school students, teachers and wardens. The Bigg Boss house will turn into a residential school where housemates will learn and also stay in their respective roles.; BEE-BEE Residential School roles: Housemates / Role; Amit / English Teacher; Aurora / Student; Divya / Student; FJ / Assistant Warden; Kamrudin / Student; Kani / Tamil Teacher; Parvathy / Warden; Prajean / Moral science Teacher and Principal; Ramya / Student; Sabarinathan / Student; Sandra / Student; Subiksha / Student; Vikram / Student; Vinoth / Student; Viyana / Student
Week 8	Sponsored	—N/a
Week 8	Exits	On Day 55: Host Vijay Sethupathi announced that no eviction would take place, due to severe weather conditions in Tamil Nadu.
Week 9
Week 9	Twists	For the captaincy task, Bigg Boss directly nominated Aadhirai as a nominee to participate in the task.
Week 9	Nominations	On Day 57, Amit, Divya, FJ, Kamrudin, Kani, Parvathy, Prajean, Sandra, Subiksha, Vikram and Vinoth were nominated for the ninth week's eviction process.
Week 9	House Captain	Ramya Joo
Week 9	Tasks	Captaincy Task: Initial nominees included Prajean and Ramya. However, Bigg Boss also selected Aadhirai to participate in the task since she has re entered the house.; On Day 57, the captaincy task was conducted with the rules being that in front of the 3 nominees there will be a long table and a bin on the other end of the table, each nominee will have 15 bricks and 3 soft balls. Once the buzzer is pushed the nominees will need to place the bricks on the table in a domino pattern manner and a ball at the very end, the nominee will then push the first brick and eventually making all the bricks fall over and making the ball fall in the bin, the nominee who does this task first will win captaincy for the week.; Nominees / Balls in bin; Aadhirai / 0; Prajean / 0; Ramya / 3
Week 9	Tasks	Aangalaa?? Pengalaa??: On Day 57, housemates must divide into 2 groups of males and females. They must debate on which gender is it male or female who performs and does a better job at household duties such as cooking, cleaning and washing. There will be 2 judges who will make the verdict of which gender's debate is more powerful.; Teams / Result of debate; Team Male / Lost debate; Team Female / Won debate; Kamrudin and Aurora were appointed as judges.
Week 9	Sponsored	—N/a
Week 9	Exits	On Day 63: Prajean Padmanabhan was evicted after facing public votes.
Week 10
Week 10	Twists	On Days 69 and 70, there were double evictions.
Week 10	Nominations	On Day 64, FJ, Kamrudin, Ramya, Sabarinathan, Sandra, Vinoth and Viyana were nominated for the tenth week's eviction process.
Week 10	House Captain	Amit Bhargav
Week 10	Tasks	Captaincy Task: On Day 64, members of the winning team from the previous week task participated in the captaincy task, Kani, Aurora, Divya, Subhiksha, Aadhirai and Amit. Each nominee would be blindfolded and the task will take place in the activity area. The nominees must find a ball while blindfolded and must sit on it when the buzzer goes off. The one who does not have a ball in each round would be disqualified. Amit Bhargav won the task and won captaincy. Sabari was the judge for the task.
Week 10	Sponsored	Housemates took part in Healthy Grocer Perungayam task.
Week 10	Exits	On Days 69 and 70: Ramya Joo and Viyana were evicted in double eviction after facing public votes.
Week 11
Week 11	Twists	On Day 71, Instead of the normal nomination process which is held private in the confession room. Bigg Boss asked the housemates to openly announce their nomination votes in garden area and apply paint on the cheeks in an "open nomination".; On Day 75, The weekly task winning team Emmadi Aathadi Nadanakulu decided Aadhirai's family to stay in Bigg Boss house for 24 hours.
Week 11	Nominations	On Day 71, Amit, Aurora, Divya, FJ, Kamrudin, Kani, Parvathy, Sandra, Subiksha, Sabarinathan and Aadhirai were nominated for the eleventh week's eviction process.
Week 11	House Captain	Gana Vinoth Kumar
Week 11	Tasks	Captaincy Task: Nominees Aadhirai, Amit, Aurora, Parvathy, Subiksha and Vinoth participated in the captaincy task. The task was for each nominee they can select a housemate to assist them will they complete the task, the nominees will be on a wooden roller while their assisting housemate will use their legs in the air to coordinate their direction. The nominees will on the floor with a basket to collect all the balls. The nominee with the highest amount of balls wins the task. Vinoth won the task and won captaincy.
Week 11	Tasks	Dance Marathon 2.0: On Days 71–74, housemates will be divided into 3 groups of 4-5 members. Bigg Boss will give the groups a set of task rounds in which they will dance to music randomly played. The team who scores the highest amount of points from all rounds will be able to participate in the following week captaincy task.
Week 11	Sponsored	Surf Excel: On Day 76, housemates were given 2 different type of washing liquids from Surf Excel and they need to explain how the 2 liquids work.
Week 11	Exits	On Day 77: Fredrick Johnson (FJ) and Aadhirai Soundarajan were evicted in double eviction after facing public votes.
Week 12
Week 12	Twists	In week 11, Aadhirai was given the special power of being able to have her family in the house for 24 hours. However, since she got evicted she gave that power to Parvathy, hence Parvathy's family was able to stay in the Bigg Boss house for 24 hours.; During the freeze and release task, housemates must complete a task in order to see their family members. If the longer it takes for them to complete the task the shorter duration time spent with the family.
Week 12	Nominations	On Day 78, Amit, Aurora, Divya, Kani, Parvathy, Sabarinathan, Sandra, Subiksha, Vikram and Vinoth were nominated for the twelfth week's eviction process.
Week 12	House Captain	Kamrudin K
Week 12	Tasks	Captaincy Task: Nominees Aadhirai, Kamrudin, Kani and Parvathy were given a captaincy task since they were selected as the best performers for the dance marathon 2.0 task. The captaincy task included each nominee having 4 balloons attached to their legs and they are responsible for saving their own balloon from being damaged by their co nominees. The nominees are also allowed to pick a co housemate to help and protect them from getting their balloons damaged. In the task Kamrudin was the last nominee with one balloon left that was undamaged and he won the captaincy task.
Week 12	Tasks	Freeze and Release: From days 78–82, housemates will be able to reunite with their family back in the house. When Bigg Boss announced "freeze" housemates will need to immediately stop what they are doing and stay in the exact same position and during this time their family will enter the house. After a few seconds Bigg Boss will announce "release" and housemates can then interact with their family.; Day / Housemates / Family members; 78 / Sandra / Husband and two Daughters; 79 / Kani / Sister and two Daughters; 79 / Sabarinathan / Mother, Sister and her Son; 79 / Vinoth / Wife, Daughter and Baby Boy; 80 / Amit / Wife and Daughter; 80 / Divya / Mother, Father and Brother; 81-82 (24 Hours) / Parvathy / Mother; 81 / Aurora / Friends and Dog (pet in AV); 81 / Kamrudin / Friend, Sister and her Daughter; 82 / Vikram / Mother, Father and Wife; 82 / Subiksha / Mother, Father and Brother
Week 12	Sponsored	On Day 81, Housemates took part in Roff Tiles task.
Week 12	Exits	On Days 83 and 84: Amit Bhargav and Kani Thiru were evicted in double eviction after facing public votes.
Week 13
Week 13	Twists	On Day 85, Bigg Boss conducted an open-nomination allowing housemates to nominate a housemate to evict openly.; Bigg Boss announced there will no longer be any house captain's for the remainder of the season.; On day 90, host Vijay Sethupathi told there are no more warnings for any housemates as Parvathy and Kamrudin were speaking bad words and violence behaviour with their co-housemates so first time in this season the host announced that Parvathy and Kamrudin are given red card, so they both are ejected from the show.
Week 13	Nominations	On Day 85, Aurora, Divya, Kamrudin, Parvathy, Sabarinathan, Sandra, Subiksha, Vikram and Vinoth were nominated for the Thirteenth week's eviction process.
Week 13	House Captain	None
Week 13	Tasks	Ticket to Finale: From days 85–89, the top 9 housemates will participate in a series of tasks to gain their position in the finale and get the immunity to become a direct finalist. The housemate with the most points at the end of all the task will win TTF and become the first direct finalist of the season.; S.NO / Contestants / Task 1 / Task 2 / Task 3 / Task 4 / Task 5 / Task 6 / Task 7 / Task 8 / Total Points; 1 / Aurora / 8 / 5 / 6 / 5 / 1 / 5 / 9 / 8 / 47; 2 / Divya / 6 / 6 / 3 / 2 / 8 / 4 / 2 / 6 / 37; 3 / Kamrudin / 7 / 2 / 7 / 8 / 5 / 2 / 1 / 5 / 37; 4 / Parvathy / 5 / 4 / 5 / 6 / 9 / 3 / 5 / 7 / 44; 5 / Sabarinathan / 4 / 7 / 8 / 9 / 6 / 1 / 7 / 3 / 45; 6 / Sandra / 1 / 9 / 4 / 7 / 4 / 6 / 8 / 2 / 41; 7 / Subiksha / 9 / 1 / 1 / 4 / 7 / 7 / 6 / 9 / 44; 8 / Vikram / 2 / 8 / 9 / 1 / 3 / 8 / 4 / 1 / 36; 9 / Vinoth / 3 / 3 / 2 / 3 / 2 / 9 / 3 / 4 / 29
Week 13	Tasks	Winner: Aurora Sinclair
Week 13	Tasks	Lost: Remaining Housemates
Week 13	Sponsored	—N/a
Week 13	Ejections	On Day 90: Kamarudin K and VJ Parvathy were kicked out of the Bigg Boss house by host Vijay Sethupathi for violating the rules and engaging in violent behavior toward their co-housemates.
Week 13	Exits	On Day 91: Subiksha Kumar was evicted after facing public votes.
Week 14
Week 14	Twists	On Day 92, Contestants are called individually to the confession room asked to eat chillies to save fellow nominated contestants,since it is 14th week, Bigg Boss announced the result that no one will be saved from the eviction process.
Week 14	Nominations	On Day 92, Divya, Sabarinathan, Sandra, Vikram and Vinoth were nominated for the fourteenth week's eviction process.
Week 14	House Captain	None
Week 14	Tasks	Money Box 2.0: From days 92–95, housemates will be given different tasks in order to collect as much of money they can for the money box sent inside the house, each round Bigg Boss will give a set of tasks which will allow housemates to increase the value of the box. If at any cost of the task one housemate decides to take the box they have to leave the Bigg Boss house and will be evicted with the amount of cash in the cash box at that time.; Task / Round / Housemate participated / Duration / Amount collected in each round (₹) / Total amount collected in each task (₹) / Total amount in money box (₹); 1 / 1 / Vinoth / 45 seconds / ₹10,000 / ₹1,75,000 / ₹1,75,000; 1 / 2 / Aurora, Sabarinathan / 45 seconds / ₹44,800 / ₹1,75,000 / ₹1,75,000; 1 / 3 / Aurora, Sabarinathan, Vinoth, Divya, Sandra, Vikram / 45 seconds / ₹90,200 / ₹1,75,000 / ₹1,75,000; 2 / 1-6 / Vikram, Sabarinathan, Vinoth, Aurora, Sandra, Divya / 120 seconds for each round / ₹10,000(Vinoth) ₹10,000(Divya) / ₹20,000 / ₹1,95,000; 3 / 1 / Aurora, Sabarinathan, Vinoth, Divya, Sandra, Vikram / On Buzzer / ₹30,000(Vinoth, Aurora, Divya) / ₹1,40,000 / ₹3,35,000; 3 / 2 / Aurora, Sabarinathan, Vinoth, Divya, Sandra, Vikram / On Buzzer / ₹30,000(Vinoth, Sandra) / ₹1,40,000 / ₹3,35,000; 3 / 3 / Aurora, Sabarinathan, Vinoth, Divya, Sandra, Vikram / On Buzzer / ₹80,000(Vinoth, Aurora, Divya) / ₹1,40,000 / ₹3,35,000; 4 / 1 / Vikram, Divya / 120 seconds / ₹65,500 / ₹1,83,500 / ₹5,18,500; 4 / 2 / Vinoth, Sabarinathan / 120 seconds / ₹68,700 / ₹1,83,500 / ₹5,18,500; 4 / 3 / Aurora, Sandra / 120 seconds / ₹49,300 / ₹1,83,500 / ₹5,18,500; 5 / - / Sabarinathan, Vinoth, Divya (Finalists) vs Viyana, Praveen, Ramya (Evictees) / Relay / - (Evictees Won) / - / ₹5,18,500; 6 / 1 / Aurora, Sabarinathan, Vinoth, Divya, Sandra, Vikram / 4 Hours (Secret Task) / ₹1,00,000 / ₹3,00,000 / ₹8,18,500; 6 / 2 / Aurora, Sabarinathan, Vinoth, Divya, Sandra, Vikram / 4 Hours (Secret Task) / ₹2,00,000 / ₹3,00,000 / ₹8,18,500; 7 / —N/a / Gifted by Vikranth / Gifted to housemates / ₹5,00,000 / —N/a / ₹13,18,500; 8 / 1 / Vikram / 5 Minutes / ₹60,000 / ₹4,45,000 / ₹17,63,500; 8 / 2 / Aurora / 5 Minutes / ₹20,000 / ₹4,45,000 / ₹17,63,500; 8 / 3 / Sandra / 5 Minutes / ₹70,000 / ₹4,45,000 / ₹17,63,500; 8 / 4 / Vinoth / 5 Minutes / ₹90,000 / ₹4,45,000 / ₹17,63,500; 8 / 5 / Sabarinathan / 5 Minutes / ₹1,05,000 / ₹4,45,000 / ₹17,63,500; 8 / 6 / Divya / 5 Minutes / ₹1,00,000 / ₹4,45,000 / ₹17,63,500
Week 14	Sponsored	—N/a
Week 14	Walked	On Day 96: Gana Vinoth Kumar walked out of the Bigg Boss house after accepting the cash prize offer.
Week 14	Exits	On Day 98: Sandra Amy was evicted after facing public votes.
Week 15 Finale Week
Week 15 Finale Week	Twists	Instead of the usual 5 finalist, this season only allowed 4 finalist to compete in the finale week.
Week 15 Finale Week	Nominations	On Day 99, Aurora, Divya, Sabarinathan and Vikram were nominated for the finale voting process.
Week 15 Finale Week	House Captain	None
Week 15 Finale Week	Tasks	Winners Speech: On Day 100, Bigg Boss asked the four finalist to present a winner speech on what they will say to the audience if they win the season. Each finalist will need to come in front of the living area and present their speech to all their co-finalist and evicted housemates.
Week 15 Finale Week	Sponsored	Colgate Toothpaste: On Day 100, the finalist and the returned housemates had to do a sponsor task for Colgate toothpaste. The task featured all the female housemates to do an advertisement for the brand while the male housemates take a photo of them. The duo with the best advertisement dialogue and photography skills wins the Colgate toothpaste package.; Apsara and Sabarinathan won the task.
Week 15 Finale Week	Exits	
Week 15 Finale Week	Day 105 Grand Finale	
Week 15 Finale Week	3rd Runner-up	Aurora Sinclair
Week 15 Finale Week	2nd Runner-up	Vikkals Vikram
Week 15 Finale Week	1st Runner-up	Sabarinathan
Week 15 Finale Week	Winner	Divya Ganesh

== Nomination table ==
#BB9	Week 1	Week 2	Week 3	Week 4		Week 5	Week 6	Week 7	Week 8		Week 9	Week 10		Week 11	Week 12	Week 13		Week 14		Week 15	
#BB9	Week 1	Week 2	Week 3	Day 22 – 27	Day 28	Week 5	Week 6	Week 7	Day 50 - 55	Day 56	Week 9	Week 10		Week 11	Week 12	Day 85	Day 86–89	Day 92	Day 93–96	Grand Finale Day 105	
Nominees for House Captain	No nominees	Aadhirai; Praveen; Tushaar	Kamrudin; Kani; Sabarinathan	Kani; Praveen; Vikram		Amit; Divya; Prajean; Sandra	Divya; Parvathy; ~~Praveen~~; Sabarinathan	FJ; Sabarinathan; Subiksha; Vinoth	FJ; Kamrudin; ~~Kemy~~; Prajean; Subiksha; Vikram		Aadhirai; Prajean; Ramya	Aadhirai; Amit; Aurora; Divya; Kani; ~~Prajean~~; Subiksha; Vikram		Aadhirai; Amit; Aurora; Parvathy; Subiksha; Vinoth	Aadhirai; Kamrudin; Kani; Parvathy	No Nominees					
House; Captain	No captain	~~Tushaar~~	Kani	Praveen		Divya	Sabarinathan	FJ			Ramya	Amit		Vinoth	Kamrudin	No Captaincy					
Captain's Nomination	No captain nomination	Diwagar; Parvathy	Subiksha; Viyana	Kamrudin; Tushaar		Parvathy; Diwagar	Viyana; Parvathy	Amit; Subiksha	Sandra; Parvathy		FJ; Subiksha	FJ; Ramya		Sandra; Parvathy	Vikram; Subiksha	No Nomination					
Nomination Free	Ramya; Subiksha; Tushaar	Aadhirai; Vinoth; Viyana	Diwagar; FJ; Kamrudin	FJ; Kani; Sabarinathan; Subiksha; Viyana		Kani	Prajean	None			Aadhirai	Aadhirai; Aurora; Divya; Kani; Subiksha; Vikram		None							
BB Jail	Vinoth; Viyana	Aadhirai; Aurora	Kamrudin; Parvathy	None		FJ; Sandra	Diwagar; FJ; Kani; Parvathy	Divya; Sandra	FJ; Vinoth		Aadhirai; Divya; Sabarinathan; Vinoth	Ramya		Sandra; Vinoth	None						
Vote to:	Evict				Wildcard Entry	Evict				Re-Entered	Evict	Task	Evict				Ticket to Finale	Evict	Cash Prize	WIN	
Divya	Not in House				Entered (Day 28)	House; Captain	Vikram; Aurora	Vikram; Vinoth	Vikram; ~~FJ~~		Kamrudin; Vinoth	Won the task (Saved)	Vinoth; Kamrudin	Amit; Sandra	Vinoth; Vikram	Subiksha; Vikram	Lost Ticket to Finale (Nominated)	Nominated	Rejected Cash Prize	Finalist	Winner (Day 105)
Sabarinathan	Kalaiyarasan; Parvathy	Parvathy; Kamrudin	Vinoth; Viyana	Parvathy; Vinoth		Diwagar; Kamrudin	House; Captain	Viyana; Parvathy	Parvathy; Divya		Parvathy; FJ	Lost the Task (Nominated)	Viyana; Vinoth	FJ; Kamrudin	Parvathy; Amit	Vinoth; Subiksha	Lost Ticket to Finale (Nominated)	Nominated	Rejected Cash Prize	Finalist	1st Runner-up (Day 105)
Vikram	Kalaiyarasan; Pravin	Kamrudin; Parvathy	Aurora; Kalaiyarasan	Parvathy; Kamrudin		Parvathy; Diwagar	Divya; Aurora	Prajean; Sandra	Sandra; Divya		Prajean; Divya	Won the task (Saved)	Sandra; Ramya	FJ; Parvathy	Sandra; Parvathy	Divya; Sandra	Lost Ticket to Finale (Nominated)	Nominated	Rejected Cash Prize	Finalist	2nd Runner-up (Day 105)
Aurora	Diwagar; Kalaiyarasan	Diwagar; Parvathy	Kalaiyarasan; Subiksha	Parvathy; Kalaiyarasan		Parvathy; Diwagar	Sandra; Amit	Parvathy; Sabarinathan	Prajean; Parvathy		Parvathy; Divya	Won the task (Saved)	Viyana; Sabarinathan	Sandra; Amit	Sandra; Parvathy	Kamrudin; Sandra	Won Ticket to Finale (Saved)	Finalist	Rejected Cash Prize	Finalist	3rd Runner-up (Day 105)
Sandra	Not in House				Entered (Day 28)	Parvathy; Diwagar	Subiksha (direct nomination)	Amit; Ramya	Vikram; ~~FJ~~		Amit; Kamrudin	Lost the Task (Nominated)	Viyana; FJ	FJ; Kamrudin	Vikram; Amit	Kamrudin; Vikram	Lost Ticket to Finale (Nominated)	Nominated	Rejected Cash Prize	Evicted (Day 98)	
Vinoth	Apsara; Kalaiyarasan	FJ; Parvathy	Aadhirai; Kemy	Kalaiyarasan; Diwagar		Parvathy; Diwagar	Diwagar; Viyana	Divya; Viyana	Divya; Sandra		Divya; Vikram	Lost the Task (Nominated)	Sabarinathan; Ramya	House Captain	Divya; Subiksha	Sabarinathan; Subiksha	Lost Ticket to Finale (Nominated)	Nominated	Accepted Cash Prize (₹17,63,500)	Walked with ₹17,63,500 before tax. (Day 96)	
Subiksha	Kalaiyarasan; Viyana	Parvathy; Apsara	Kalaiyarasan; Tushaar	Kamrudin; Vinoth		Parvathy; Diwagar	Kemy; Ramya	Ramya; Sandra	Amit; Ramya		FJ; Kamrudin	Won the task (Saved)	Sabarinathan; Kamrudin	FJ; Sabarinathan	Aurora; Sabarinathan	Vinoth; Divya	Lost Ticket to Finale (Nominated)	Evicted (Day 91)			
Kamrudin	Apsara; Diwagar	Diwagar; Parvathy	Aadhirai; Aurora	Aurora; Kalaiyarasan		Vikram; Kemy	Kani; Vikram	Kani; Kemy	Divya; Sandra		Divya; Sandra	Lost the Task (Nominated)	Sabarinathan; FJ	Sandra; FJ	House Captain	Aurora; Parvathy	Lost Ticket to Finale (Nominated)	Ejected (Day 90)			
Parvathy	Kani; Pravin	FJ; Kemy	Praveen; Tushaar	Aurora; Kemy		Vikram; Kemy	Kani; Vikram	Vikram; Aurora	Aurora; ~~FJ~~		FJ; Amit	Lost the Task (Not Nominated)	Sabarinathan; Ramya	Kani; Aurora	Vikram; Aurora	Kamrudin; Aurora	Lost Ticket to Finale (Nominated)	Ejected (Day 90)			
Kani	Aadhirai; Viyana	Kamrudin; Parvathy	House; Captain	Granted Nomination Free from Praveen		Parvathy; Diwagar	Sandra; Parvathy	Prajean; Sandra	Sandra; Parvathy		Parvathy; Prajean	Won the task (Saved)	Ramya; Sandra	Sandra; Kamrudin	Sandra; Parvathy	Evicted (Day 84)					
Kani	Aadhirai; Viyana	Kamrudin; Parvathy	House; Captain	Parvathy; Kamrudin		Parvathy; Diwagar	Sandra; Parvathy	Prajean; Sandra	Sandra; Parvathy		Parvathy; Prajean	Won the task (Saved)	Ramya; Sandra	Sandra; Kamrudin	Sandra; Parvathy	Evicted (Day 84)					
Amit	Not in House				Entered (Day 28)	Parvathy; Viyana	Divya; Aurora	Prajean; Sandra	Divya; Prajean		Prajean; Divya	Won the task (Saved)	House Captain	Aadhirai; Divya	Kani; Aurora	Evicted (Day 83)					
Aadhirai	Diwagar; Kalaiyarasan	Parvathy; Kamrudin	Subiksha; Viyana	Evicted (Day 21)						Re-Entered (Day 56)	FJ; Kani	Won the task (Saved)	Kamrudin; FJ	Sandra; Amit	Evicted (Day 77)						
FJ	Kalaiyarasan; Pravin	Diwagar; Parvathy	Subiksha; Viyana	Parvathy; Kamrudin		Diwagar; Viyana	Diwagar; Viyana	House; Captain			Parvathy; Sandra	Lost the Task (Nominated)	Sandra; Ramya	Subiksha; Sabarinathan	Evicted (Day 77)						
Viyana	Kalaiyarasan; Praveen	Aurora; Parvathy	Aadhirai; Aurora	Vinoth; Aurora		Sabari; FJ	Kani; Sandra	Sabarinathan; Aurora	Prajean; Divya		Vikram; Vinoth	Lost the Task (Nominated)	Sabarinathan; Ramya	Evicted (Day 70)							
Ramya	Aadhirai; Diwagar	Parvathy; Aurora	Aadhirai; Kalaiyarasan	Kamrudin; Viyana		Diwagar; Tushaar	Aurora; Sandra	Prajean; Parvathy	Kamrudin; Kani		House; Captain	Lost the Task (Nominated)	Viyana; Parvathy	Evicted (Day 69)							
Prajean	Not in House				Entered (Day 28)	Parvathy; Diwagar	Subiksha (direct nomination)	Kani; Kemy	Kani; Viyana		Amit; Kamrudin	Evicted (Day 63)									
Kemy	Diwagar; Sabarinathan	Diwagar; Parvathy	Aurora; Parvathy	Parvathy; Kamrudin		Parvathy; Diwagar	Ramya; Kani	Divya; Subiksha	Evicted (Day 49)												
Diwagar	Kemy; Praveen	Kamrudin; Ramya	Praveen; Ramya	Kamrudin; Vinoth		Sabari; Ramya	Ramya; Vinoth	Evicted (Day 42)													
Praveen	Kalaiyarasan; Pravin	Aurora; Diwagar	Aadhirai; Ramya	Granted Nomination Free To Kani		Parvathy; Diwagar	Evicted (Day 35)														
Praveen	Kalaiyarasan; Pravin	Aurora; Diwagar	Aadhirai; Ramya	House; Captain		Parvathy; Diwagar	Evicted (Day 35)														
Tushaar	Apsara; Kalaiyarasan	~~House~~; ~~Captain~~	Aadhirai; Kalaiyarasan	Parvathy; Kamrudin		Praveen; Vinoth	Evicted (Day 34)														
Kalaiyarasan	Aadhirai; Diwagar	Diwagar; Sabarinathan	Ramya; Viyana	Kamrudin; Vinoth		Evicted (Day 27)															
Apsara	Aurora Kalaiyarasan	Diwagar; Parvathy	Evicted (Day 14)																		
Pravin	Diwagar; Praveen	Evicted (Day 7)																			
Nandhini	Kalaiyarasan; Viyana	Walked (Day 5)																			
Notes	1, 2, 3	4, 5	6, 7	8, 9, 10, 11		12, 13	14		15, 16, 17	18						19,21		20	22,23	24,25,26,27	
Against Public Vote	Aadhirai; Apsara; Diwagar; Kalaiyarasan; Pravin; Praveen; Viyana	Apsara; Aurora; Diwagar; FJ; Kamrudin; Kemy; Parvathy; Ramya; Sabarinathan	Aadhirai; Aurora; Kalaiyarasan; Praveen; Ramya; Subiksha; Tushaar; Viyana	Aurora; Kalaiyarasan; Kamrudin; Parvathy; Vinoth		Diwagar; FJ; Kamrudin; Kemy; Parvathy; Praveen; Ramya; Sabarinathan; Tushaar; Vikram; Vinoth; Viyana	Aurora; Divya; Diwagar; Kani; Parvathy; Ramya; Sandra; Subiksha; Vikram; Viyana	Amit; Aurora; Divya; Kani; Kemy; Parvathy; Prajean; Ramya; Sabarinathan; Sandra; Subiksha; Vikram; Viyana	Amit; Aurora; Divya; ~~FJ~~; Kamrudin; Kani; Parvathy; Prajean; Ramya; Sandra; Vikram; Viyana		Amit; Divya; FJ; Kamrudin; Kani; Parvathy; Prajean; Sandra; Subiksha; Vikram; Vinoth	FJ; Kamrudin; Ramya; Sabarinathan; Sandra; Vinoth; Viyana		Aadhirai; Amit; Aurora; Divya; FJ; Kamrudin; Kani; Parvathy; Sabarinathan; Sandra; Subiksha	Amit; Aurora; Divya; Kani; Parvathy; Sabarinathan; Sandra; Subiksha; Vikram; Vinoth	~~Aurora~~; Divya; Kamrudin; Parvathy; Sabarinathan; Sandra; Subiksha; Vikram; Vinoth		Divya; Sabarinathan; Sandra; Vikram; ~~Vinoth~~		Aurora; Divya; Sabarinathan; Vikram	
Re-entered	None									Aadhirai	None										
Ejected	None															Kamrudin		None			
Ejected	None															Parvathy		None			
Walked	Nandhini	None																Vinoth		None	
Evicted	Pravin	Apsara	Aadhirai	Kalaiyarasan		Tushaar	Diwagar	Kemy	No; Eviction		Prajean	Ramya		FJ	Amit	Subiksha		Sandra		Aurora	Vikram
Evicted	Pravin	Apsara	Aadhirai	Kalaiyarasan		Praveen	Diwagar	Kemy	No; Eviction		Prajean	Viyana		Aadhirai	Kani	Subiksha		Sandra		Sabarinathan	Divya

=== Notes ===
indicates that the Housemate was directly nominated for eviction.
indicates that the Housemate was immune prior to nominations.
indicates the contestant has been evicted.
indicates the contestant walked out due to emergency.
indicates the contestant has been ejected.
indicates the house captain.
indicates the winner.
indicates the first runner up.
indicates the second runner up.
indicates the third runner up.
indicates the contestant as the weak performer of the week.
indicates the contestant has re-entered the house.

- ^1: On Day 1 during first week nomination, Bigg Boss announced that all the housemates can come to a conclusion and grant 3 Deluxe room housemates an exemption from public voting. Hence they choose Ramya, Subhiksha and Tushaar to be exempt.
- ^2: On Day 5, Nandhini left the house due to mental health reasons.
- ^3: On Day 5, Vinoth and Viyana were sent to the BB jail due to lack of performance during activities.
- ^4: On Day 8 during second week nomination, Bigg Boss announced that all the housemates can come to a conclusion and grant 3 Deluxe room housemates an exemption from public voting. Hence they choose Aadhirai, Vinoth and Viyana to be exempt.
- ^5: On Day 11, Bigg Boss revoked Tushaar from his captaincy after failing to fulfil his duties as the house captain of the Bigg Boss house.
- ^6: Since Kamrudin won the mask task he was granted an exemption in week 3's nomination process
- ^7: On Day 15 during third week nomination, Bigg Boss announced that all the housemates can come to a conclusion and grant 2 Deluxe room housemates an exemption from public voting. Hence they choose Dhiwagar and FJ to be exempt.
- ^8: Since Praveen and Subiksha received the most coins in the Bigg Boss juice factory task in their own respective teams, they were granted exemption in week 4's nomination process
- ^9: Since Praveen was not able to be granted 2 powers which included the nomination free pass and captaincy, Bigg Boss announced that he should grant either his immunity to a co housemate and he chose to grant the free-pass to Kani, hence Kani was granted an exemption in week 4's nomination process
- ^10: Since Subiksha won the Juice Factory task, Bigg Boss gave her a special power to save another housemate of her choice in week 4's nomination process and she chose Viyana to be saved.
- ^11: On Day 22 during fourth week nomination, Bigg Boss announced that all the housemates can come to a conclusion and grant 2 Deluxe room housemates an exemption from public voting. Hence they choose FJ and Sabarinathan to be exempt.
- ^12: Since Kalaiyarasan and Kani won the story task (week 1-4), they won a nomination free pass in week 5.
- ^13: Amit, Prajean and Sandra were given exemption from nomination in week 5 since they entered the house only 1 week earlier.
- ^14: In week 5, Sandra and Prajean were given a secret task. In that task if they successfully completed it they would be given a nomination free pass for one of them and a special power to directly nominate a housemate for eviction. Hence Prajean took the nomination free pass and was saved, and both of them directly nominated Subiksha for the week 6 nomination.
- ^15: On Day 50, FJ was nominated for eviction but however since he won the captaincy task he was exempt from nomination in week 8.
- ^16: On Day 56, Aadhirai re-entered the Bigg Boss house.
- ^17: No eviction took place in week 8 due to severe weather warning in Tamil Nadu.
- ^18: In week 8, FJ was nominated as one of the worst performers in the "BEE BEE school task" hence as a consequence he was not able to participate in the week 9 captaincy task.
- ^19: In week 13, Aurora won the ticket to finale task and was exempt from the nomination process.
- ^20: Since Aurora won the ticket to finale task, she became the 1st finalist of the season.
- ^21: Parvathy and Kamrudin ejected via red card by the host
- ^22: On Day 96, Vinoth walked out after accepting the 18 lakh cash prize offer.
- ^23: Sandra Amy was evicted on Day 98 making this season have only four finalists.
- ^24 : Aurora Sinclair become 3rd runner-up.
- ^25 : Vikkals Vikram become 2nd runner-up.
- ^26 : Sabarinathan become 1st runner-up.
- ^27 : Divya Ganesan become the winner of this season.
