= Annam (TV series) =

2024 Indian Tamil–language television drama series

- Genre: Drama
- Written by: S.Marudhu Shankar
- Screenplay by: Devibala
- Directed by: N.Sundareshwaran
- Starring: Abi Nakshatra; Master Bharath
- Theme music composer: Hari
- Country of origin: India
- Original language: Tamil
- No. of seasons: 1
- No. of episodes: 500+

Production
- Executive producers: V.Murali Raaman; K.Venpa Kathiresan
- Cinematography: P.Chella Pandiyan
- Editor: Sajin C
- Camera setup: Multi-camera
- Running time: Approx. 40–45 minutes per episode (2026–present) Approx.20–22 minutes per episode (2024–2026)
- Production companies: Sun Entertainment; Ayyan Movie Makers

Original release
- Network: Sun TV
- Release: 2 December 2024 – present

Annam is a 2024 Indian Tamil-language television series written by S.Marudhu Shankar, directed by N.Sundareshwaran, and starring Abi Natchatra and Master Bharath. The series produced by Sun Entertainment and Ayyan Movie Makers. It premiered on 2 December 2024, and airs from daily on Sun TV and also available on the digital platform Sun NXT from April 13, 2026.

== Synopsis ==
Annam is a village girl. She takes care of her family and faces all of life's issues calmly. She, living with an estranged father and a cruel stepmother, longs for a loving bond to escape her home for marriage to the right person.

== Cast ==
=== Main ===
- Abi Nakshatra as Annalakshmi Karthikeyan alias Annam: Karthik's wife
- Bharat Kumar as Karthikeyan "Karthik" Sanmugapandiyan: Sanmugapandiyan and Sebavagalli's younger son; EX- Ramya's husband/ Annalakshmi's husband (bill Colloter Vela)
- Sai Dhiyashini as Child Amman alias Kaliyamma

=== Recurring ===
- Divya Ganesh / Priyanka Shivanna as Ramya Saravanan: Saravanan's wife (Main Antagonist)
- Manohar Krishnan as Sanmugapandiyan alias Shanumgam: Senbagavalli's husband; Karthik, Saravanan, Mani, Sudar's father
  - Unknown as young Shanmugam
- Rajyalakshmi as Senbagavalli Sanmugapandiyan alias Shenbagam: Shanmugam's wife; Karthik, Saravanan, Mani, Sudar's mother (Antagonist)
- Ashwin Karthik as Saravanan "Saravana" Sanmugapandiyan: Sanmugapandiyan and Senbagavalli's elder son; EX- Annam's husband/ Ramya's husband
- Bharatha Naidu as Manimozhi Kathagundu alias Mani: Sanmugapandiyan & Senbagavalli's Younger elder dughter; Kathagundu's wife(Antagonist)
- Mahanadi Shankar as Saamydurai alias Saamy
- Saivam Ravi as Chellakili
- Ganesh as Kathagundu alias Ganeshan: Senbagavalli's brother; Manimozhi's husband
- Kavitha as Amaravathi
- VJ Vijay as Gaurav
- Priyadharshini Arunachalam as Sundarvizhli Sanmugapandiyan alias Sudar: Sanmugapandiyan& Senbgavalli's Youngest daughter; Aadhi's love interest
- Madhan as Aadhi: Sudar's love interest
- Rani as Aadhi's mother: Judge
- Ramya Srinivasan as Suhasini
- Bharathi as Bhomathi
- --- as Sundarapandi alias Sundaram
  - Unknown as young Sundaram

=== Special appearances ===
- Kayal family members in Megasangamam (2025)
- Marumagal family members in Megasangamam (2025)
- Maanya Anand as Kanmani (Guest in Annam & Kayal & Marumagal Megasangamam) (2025)
- Keerthi Vijay as Ponmani (Guest in Annam & Kayal & Marumagal Megasangamam) (2025)
- Y. G. Mahendran as Sakthivel Kalingarayar (Guest in Annam & Kayal & Marumagal Megasangamam) (2025)
- Sekar Raja as Duraisingam (Guest in Annam & Kayal & Marumagal Megasangamam) (2025)
- GV Krishna as Dinesh (Guest in Annam & Kayal & Marumagal Megasangamam) (2025)
- TSR Srinivasan as Aarumugam (Guest in Annam & Kayal & Marumagal Megasangamam) (2025)
- Meenakshi Muruha as Aarumagam's wife (Guest in Annam & Kayal & Marumagal Megasangamam) (2025)
- Ineya as herself
- Chellame Chellame family members in Mahasangamam (2026)

== Broadcast history ==
It began airing on Sun TV on 2 December 2024 from Monday to Saturday at 19:00 (IST). Starting on 20 July 2026, Later, a serial named Malli it shifted to the evening slot at 18:30 IST..it shifted to the night slot at 19:00 IST. Later, a serial named Malli replaced this show.

== Production ==
=== Casting ===
Abi Natchatra plays the lead role in the series alongside Bharat Kumar, marking both debut appearance in a Tamil Television series. Divya Ganesh was selected to play the role of Ramya, but in end of October 2025, Divya quit the series to participate in Bigg Boss Tamil season 9, so she was replaced by actress Priyanka Shivanna.

In September 2025, actors Maanya Anand and Y. G. Mahendran joined the cast for a special crossover event titled Triveni Sangamam.

== Crossovers ==
A crossover with Kayal, Annam and Marumagal are together for a special crossover event titled Triveni Sangamam was announced on 15 September to 8 October 2025 for an unforgettable ride.
