= Manasellam (TV series) =

- Also known as: மனசெல்லாம்
- Genre: Family; Romance
- Written by: Tamizhmaran (dialogues)
- Screenplay by: Tamizhmaran
- Directed by: Brahma G. Dev
- Starring: Deepak Kumar; Surendar Shanmugam; Venba; Parameshwari Reddy
- Music by: Aron
- Country of origin: India
- Original language: Tamil
- No. of seasons: 1

Production
- Producer: Shihan Dr. Puspanathan
- Cinematography: Gopal
- Editor: Rameshkumar
- Camera setup: Multi-camera
- Running time: 20–22 minutes per episode

Original release
- Network: Zee Tamil
- Release: 20 January – 22 November 2025

Manasellam (transl. All over the heart) is an Indian Tamil-language romantic family drama series that premiered on 20 January 2025 and ended on 22 November 2025 on Zee Tamil. It digitally streams on ZEE5. It stars Deepak Kumar, Surendar Shanmugam, Venba and Parameshwari Reddy in the lead roles. The serial is based on the bond between an two elder brother and his two younger sisters family. It is produced by Shihan Dr. Puspanathan, written by Ramana Gopinath and directed by Brahma G. Dev. The series was launched along with Gettimelam.

== Plot ==
The story revolves around Raja Sundaram's family and his brother Gunasekaran and Sisters Subbulakshmi and Varalakshmi, who run a 'Cholan Masala' business out of their village.

Raja Sundaram's son Karikalan, an illiterate but kind person. Gunasekaran's son Arul, who in foreign education. Subbulakshmi, she is widow, her daughter Nandini is studious and patriotic. Second younger sister Varalakshmi's daughter Vanathi is distant from studies but innocent. They are plans to arrange two marriages, Karikalan with Vanathi and Arul with Nandini in same time. However the revelation of a secret love of Vanathi with Arul disrupts these plans and sparking conflict. The marriage ends with Karikalan weds Nandini and Arul weds Vanathi.

== Cast ==
=== Main ===
- Deepak Chinky as Karikalan: Nandini's husband, Vanathi's ex-fiance, Arul's elder cousin, Sundaram and Manimegalai's son
- Jai Bala / Surendar Shanmugam as Arul: Vanathi's love interest turned husband, Nandini's ex-fiance and ex-lover, Karikalan's younger cousin, Gunasekaran and Kalyani's son
- Venba as Vanathi: Arul's wife, Karikalan's ex-fiancee and ex-lover, Varalakshmi's daughter
- Parameshwari Reddy as Nandini: Karikalan's wife, Arul's ex-fiancee and ex-lover, Subbulakshmi's daughter

=== Recurring ===
- Uday Mahesh as Raja Sundaram: Manimegalai's husband and Karikalan's father
- Surendar Raaj as Gunasekaran: Sundaram's younger brother, Kalyani's husband and Arul and Kayal's father
- Bagyalakshmi as Manimegalai: Raja Sundaram's wife and Karikalan's mother
- Sindhujaa Vijii as Kalyani: Gunasekaran's wife and Arul and Kayal's mother
- Devi Teju as Subbulakshmi: Nandini's mother, Sundaram and Gunasekaran's first younger sister, Varalakshmi's elder sister
- Vasavi as Varalakshmi: Vanathi, and Sathya's mother, Sundaram and Gunasekaran's second younger sister, Subbulakshmi's younger sister
- Yadhavi / Vinitha as Kanaga: Sundaram's daughter from another wife
- Udumalai Ravi as Kanaga's uncle
- Hari Krishnan as Kalyani's brother
- Keerthi Vijay as Aishwarya
- Hema Chinraj as Sathya
- Dheekshi Jansi as Kayal
- Sumathi Sri as Arul, Karikalan, Nandini and Vanathi's grandmother

== Production ==
=== Casting ===
After Endrendrum Punnagai, Deepak Kumar made a comeback on Zee Tamil, through the series as "Karikalan". Newcomer Jai Bala was cast as Arul, with his rise to fame coming through his numerous short films and single shot film Drama. On 19 May 2025, Jai Bala opted out from the show and was replaced by Surendhar. Actress Venba made her debut as Vanathi, with her rise to fame coming through her numerous child artist roles in films. Telugu Television actress Parameshwari Reddy made her Tamil debut as Nandini.

=== Release ===
The first promo was released on 15 December 2024, which gave a brief insight in Raja Sundaram's family and The main characters of the series were also introduced. The second promo was unveiled on 3 January 2025, featuring Deepak Kumar, Jai Bala, Venba and Parameshwari Reddy depicting the story with a song and revealing the leads.

In end of July 2025, actress Sandhya was cast as special Appearance.
