= Sarojini (2025 TV series) =

- Genre: Family; Drama
- Created by: Avni Telemedia
- Screenplay by: Khushbu Sundar
- Creative director: Khushbu Sundar
- Starring: Khushbu Sundar; Niyaz Musaliyar
- Country of origin: India
- Original language: Tamil
- No. of seasons: 2
- No. of episodes: 110

Production
- Producer: Khushbu Sundar
- Camera setup: Multi-camera
- Production company: Avni Telemedia

Original release
- Network: DD Tamil
- Release: 14 April 2025 – present

Sarojini is a 2025 Indian Tamil-language television drama series that premiered on 14 April 2025 on DD Tamil and streams digitally on waves OTT. The series tells the importance of a middle-aged housewife, Sarojini, has dedicated her life to her husband and three children (Vinaiya, Vinoth and Ramya) and follows Sarojini's journey to keep the family.

The show Screenplay and Produced by Avni Telemedia under Khushbu Sundar and starring Khushbu Sundar and Niyaz Musaliyar in extended special appearance.

== Series overview ==
Series	Episodes	Originally released	
Series	Episodes	First released	Last released
1	100	14 April 2025	2 September 2025
2	TBA	19 October 2026	TBA

== Plot ==
Sarojini is a middle-aged, resilient and determined housewife who works extremely hard for her family. She, despite her parents’ opposition, marries her beloved Vasudevan, who works as a customs officer. Her journey is marked by struggles to balance her role as a dutiful wife, mother and the challenges faced by girls in this modern world.

== Cast ==
=== Main ===
- Khushbu Sundar as Sarojini Vasudevan
- Niyaz Musaliyar as Vasudevan(dead)

=== Recurring ===
- Kavya Bellu as Vinaiya
- Koushik Shivanand as Vinoth
- ... as Ramya
- Arvind Kathare / Krishna Kumar
- Banu Mathy / Nisha / Rindhya as Roopa
- Sheela as Saradha

== Productions ==
=== Development ===
After Radhika Sarathkumar and Vikatan Televistas moved to DD Tamil, In December 2024 Kushboo also confirmed she would be produced by Khushbu Sundar under Avni Telemedia and also as a screenplay writer by Kushboo Sundar.

=== Casting ===
Casting of the series started in March 2025, with Khushbu Sundar being cast as the protagonist Sarojini, returning to television after three years. Newcomer Malayalam Television actor Niyaz Musaliyar was cast as male lead. Arvind Kathare, Kavya Bellu, Koushik Shivanand and Banu Mathy were also cast.
