= Office (2025 TV series) =

2025 Indian television series

- Genre: Workplace comedy Sitcom
- Written by: Manimaran Thirunavukarasu; Kathiresan Parthiban; Vetri
- Story by: Box Office Studio
- Directed by: Adbul Kabeez
- Starring: Guru Lakshman; Smeha Manimegalai; Keerthivel; Vyshali Kemkar; Thamizhvani; RJ Sarithiran; Shiva Aravind; Prankster Rahul; Sabaresh; TSR Srinivasan
- Theme music composer: Flute Navin
- Composer: Saran Raghavan
- Country of origin: India
- Original language: Tamil
- No. of seasons: 1
- No. of episodes: 100

Production
- Executive producer: Vimal Kumar
- Producer: Jegan Baskaran
- Production location: Tamil Nadu
- Cinematography: Regimel Surya Thomas; K. Santhosa Pandi
- Editor: Vijay Krishnan
- Camera setup: Multi-camera
- Running time: approx.20–22 minutes per episode
- Production company: Box Office Studio

Original release
- Network: JioHotstar
- Release: 21 February – 8 August 2025

Office is an Indian Tamil-language workplace comedy sitcom television series that premiered on 21 February 2025 and ended on 8 August 2025 on JioHotstar. It follows amusing events at a Tehsildar's office in a small village. The series is written by Manimaran Thirunavukarasu and Kathiresan Parthiban, Vetri and directed by Adbul Kabeez. The primary cast includes Guru Lakshman with Smeha Manimegalai, Keerthivel, Vyshali Kemkar, Thamizhvani and others.

== Synopsis ==
Office unfolds in a small-town Tehsildar’s office, where employees with contrasting work ethics navigate bureaucratic challenges. The show highlights how analogue meets digital in an amusing and sometimes chaotic fashion, turning mundane office work into hilarious situations.

== Cast ==
- Guru Lakshman as Parivendhar "Paari"
- Smeha Manimegalai as Indhu
- Keerthivel as Sanieswaran "Sani"
- Vyshali Kemkar as Sharmila "Sharmi"
- Thamizhvani as Muthazhagu
- RJ Sarithiran as Raghavan, an Tehsildar
- Shiva Aravind as Mani
- Prankster Rahul as Moorthy
- Sabaresh as Prakash
- Vijayalakshmi Veeramani as Veni, Prakash's wife and Sangu's sister
- TSR Srinivasan as Napoleon, an Deputy Tehsildar
- Thangadurai as Hari
- Kavitha Bharathi as King Jambulingam
- Paranthaman as Jambulingam's assistant
- Nithya Ravindran as Paari's mother and Chezhiyan's wife
- Jayarao as District Collector Chezhiyan, a retired IAS and Paari's father
- KPY Dhanasekar as Paari's brother-in- law and government officer
- Reshmi Karthigeyan as Indhu's mother
- Akshay Kamal as Sathyan, Indhu's fiancée
- Raaj Mithran as Jeyaraj, Indhu's uncle and Raghavan's cousin
- Boys Rajan as District Collector Kumar IAS
- Rafeeq
- Reshma
- Anna Bharathi as Paari's sister

== Episodes ==
No. overall	No. in season	Title	Directed by	Written by	Original release date
1	1	"New Arrival"	Adbul Kabeez	Vetri	21 February 2025
2	2	"Mistaken Identity"	Adbul Kabeez	Vetri	21 February 2025
3	3	"Burst Bubble"	Adbul Kabeez	Vetri	21 February 2025
4	4	"Another Argument"	Adbul Kabeez	Vetri	21 February 2025
5	5	"Village Trouble"	Adbul Kabeez	Vetri	28 February 2025
6	6	"House Hunting"	Adbul Kabeez	Vetri	28 February 2025
7	7	"Sleep Ritual"	Adbul Kabeez	Vetri	28 February 2025
8	8	"Father's Fury"	Adbul Kabeez	Vetri	28 February 2025
9	9	"Interview Call"	Adbul Kabeez	Vetri	7 March 2025
10	10	"A New Enemy"	Adbul Kabeez	Vetri	7 March 2025
11	11	"The Missing Wig"	Adbul Kabeez	Vetri	7 March 2025
12	12	"Matchmaking"	Adbul Kabeez	Vetri	7 March 2025
13	13	"Unwanted Guest"	Adbul Kabeez	Vetri	14 March 2025
14	14	"Hit and Miss"	Adbul Kabeez	Vetri	14 March 2025
15	15	"Action, Reaction"	Adbul Kabeez	Vetri	14 March 2025
16	16	"The Start of Love"	Adbul Kabeez	Vetri	14 March 2025
17	17	"Escalation"	Adbul Kabeez	Vetri	21 March 2025
18	18	"Party Planning"	Adbul Kabeez	Vetri	21 March 2025
19	19	"Haunted Party"	Adbul Kabeez	Vetri	21 March 2025
20	20	"Resolution"	Adbul Kabeez	Vetri	21 March 2025
21	21	"Lease, Lies and Lost Goats"	Adbul Kabeez	Vetri	28 March 2025
22	22	"A Missing Goat and Hidden Truths"	Adbul Kabeez	Vetri	28 March 2025
23	23	"Truth Unravel and New Dilemmas"	Adbul Kabeez	Vetri	28 March 2025
24	24	"Buried Truths and Broken Ties"	Adbul Kabeez	Vetri	28 March 2025
25	25	"Who Took It?"	Adbul Kabeez	Vetri	4 April 2025
26	26	"Echoes of Theft"	Adbul Kabeez	Vetri	4 April 2025
27	27	"A Risky Retrieval"	Adbul Kabeez	Vetri	4 April 2025
28	28	"The Uninvited Guests"	Adbul Kabeez	Vetri	4 April 2025

== Production ==
=== Development ===
The show was announced by JioHotstar on 23 November 2024. The series production is handled by Box Office Studio, which has already produced reality shows and television series BB Jodigal (2021), Cooku with Comali (season 5) and Panivizhum Malarvanam (2024).

The series is written by Vetri and directed by Adbul Kabeez. It has music by Saran Raghavan, and cinematography by Regimel Surya Thomas and K. Santhosa Pandi.

=== Release ===
The first trailer was released on 27 January 2025 featuring an old woman's cow chasing the employees in the Tehsildar's office.

It was announced that the series would be released in Tamil and other Indian languages and would make its streaming debut on 21 February 2025.

== Soundtrack ==
The first theme song was released on 17 January 2025 on the JioHotstar YouTube Channel.

Track list
No.	Title	Lyrics	Music	Artist	Length
1.	"Office Paattu ஆபீஸ் பாட்டு"	Blade Shankar	Flute Navin	Mukesh Mohamed	1:06

== Reception ==
Raisa Nasreen of Times Now wrote "A swifter pace, would help the show feel a bit crisp. Given their outfits, and looks, some of the characters seemed too stylish, in village-set up, making one wonder if a backstory about them would also follow in the upcoming episodes. The fact that the show places urban people in a rural set up, would remind one of the popular show Panchayat, made in Tamil as Thalaivettiyaan Paalayam. What worked well was the show amusing comedy and the way it challenged social issues."
