= Dhanam (TV series) =

- Genre: Drama
- Written by: Estrella Stories Group
- Screenplay by: Selvaraj; Saravanan; Subamanimala
- Directed by: N. Manjokumar
- Starring: Sathya Devarajan; Krish
- Theme music composer: Karaneshwaran
- Country of origin: India
- Original language: Tamil
- No. of seasons: 1
- No. of episodes: 380

Production
- Producer: Kushmavathy
- Production location: Tamil Nadu
- Cinematography: M. Antony
- Editor: Aravindraj
- Camera setup: Multi-Camera
- Running time: approx. 22–24 minutes per episode
- Production company: Estrella Stories LLP

Original release
- Network: Star Vijay
- Release: 17 February 2025 – 16 May 2026

Dhanam - Ungalil Oruthi is a 2025 Indian Tamil-language drama television series that premiered on Star Vijay from 17 February 2025 and ended on 16 May 2026 with 380 episodes. It streams digitally on JioHotstar. The show is directed by N. Manjokumar and produced by Kushmavathy under the banner of Estrella Stories LLP. It stars Sathya Devarajan and Sathya SK (who is replaced by Krish) in a lead role alongside Priyanka Sankar and trans actor Vaishulisa Vallal in pivotal roles. The series is also dubbed in Malayalam as Sindoorapottu from 1 September 2025 to 31 July 2026 on Asianet.

== Synopsis ==
The series revolves around Dhanam, a woman auto driver who balances her family responsibilities and struggles against societal challenges.

== Cast ==
=== Main ===
- Sathya Devarajan as Dhanalakshmi a.k.a. Dhanam: Ganesha Moorthy's widow and Kathiresan's wife.
- Sathya SK (2025) / Krish (Aug.2025–2026) as Manaparai Kathiresan alias Kathir: Dhanam's second husband

=== Supporting ===
- Rekha Angelina / Agalaya Agal as Vasuki: Kathir's mother
- Roopa Sree as Rukku a.k.a Rukmani: Ganesha Moorthy's mother.
- Ishwarya Ravichandran as Soundarya : Ganesha Moorthy's sister. Shanmugam’s Wife
- Arjun Arumugam as Shanmugam : Soundarya's Husband. Ganesha Moorthy’s friend.
- Janhave Tanav as Nila: Kathir's foster daughter and niece
- V.J. Kalyani as Shalini: Ganesha Moorthy 's sister.
- Douglas Kumaramoorthi as Douglas: Kathir's friend
- Peter as Satriyan : Ganesha Moorthy's Brother and Killer
- Priyanka as Maragatham: Rukku's Sister, Ganesha Moorthy, Soundarya, Shalini, Satriyan’s maternal aunt.
- Priyanka Robo Shankar as Maari
- Vaishulisa Vallal as Nandhini
- Bhuvaneshwari as Bhuvana
- Rakshitaa Maggie as Fathima
- Stella Marshal as Stella
- Sreedevi Muthukrishnan as Ammu
- Shilpa Mary Teresa as Sornavathy: Rukku's sister-in-law
- Gurupharan as Pandi

=== Special appearance ===
- Shreekumar as Ganesha Moorthy: Rukku's son, Dhanam's husband. (2025) (Killed by Satriyan)

== Production ==
The show was launched by Vijay TV in early 2025 after the end of Bigg Boss Tamil 7.

=== Casting ===
Ethirneechal fame Sathya Devarajan was cast in the female lead role as Dhanam, by making this her first lead role. At the time of casting, Sathya had been participating in the television series Ethirneechal 2; Sathya would end up leaving her role there in order to join the Dhanam cast. Actor Shreekumar plays an extended special appearance as Ganesha Moorthy. Actor Sathya SK was cast in the male lead role as Manaparai Kathiresan, marking his return after Bigg Boss Tamil 7. However, he also left resulting in Krish to play the role in August 2025.

In May 2025 Priyanka Sankar was cast to play supporting role Maari. In after few Months Trans Actress Vaishulisa Vallal was cast as Nandhini.

== Promotion and reception ==
The show's promotional campaign drew attention by comparing it with other series like Ethirneechal. To celebrate the storyline focusing on women auto drivers, the Dhanam team hosted a special treat and party for 50 women auto drivers.
