= Startup Singam =

Indian reality TV series

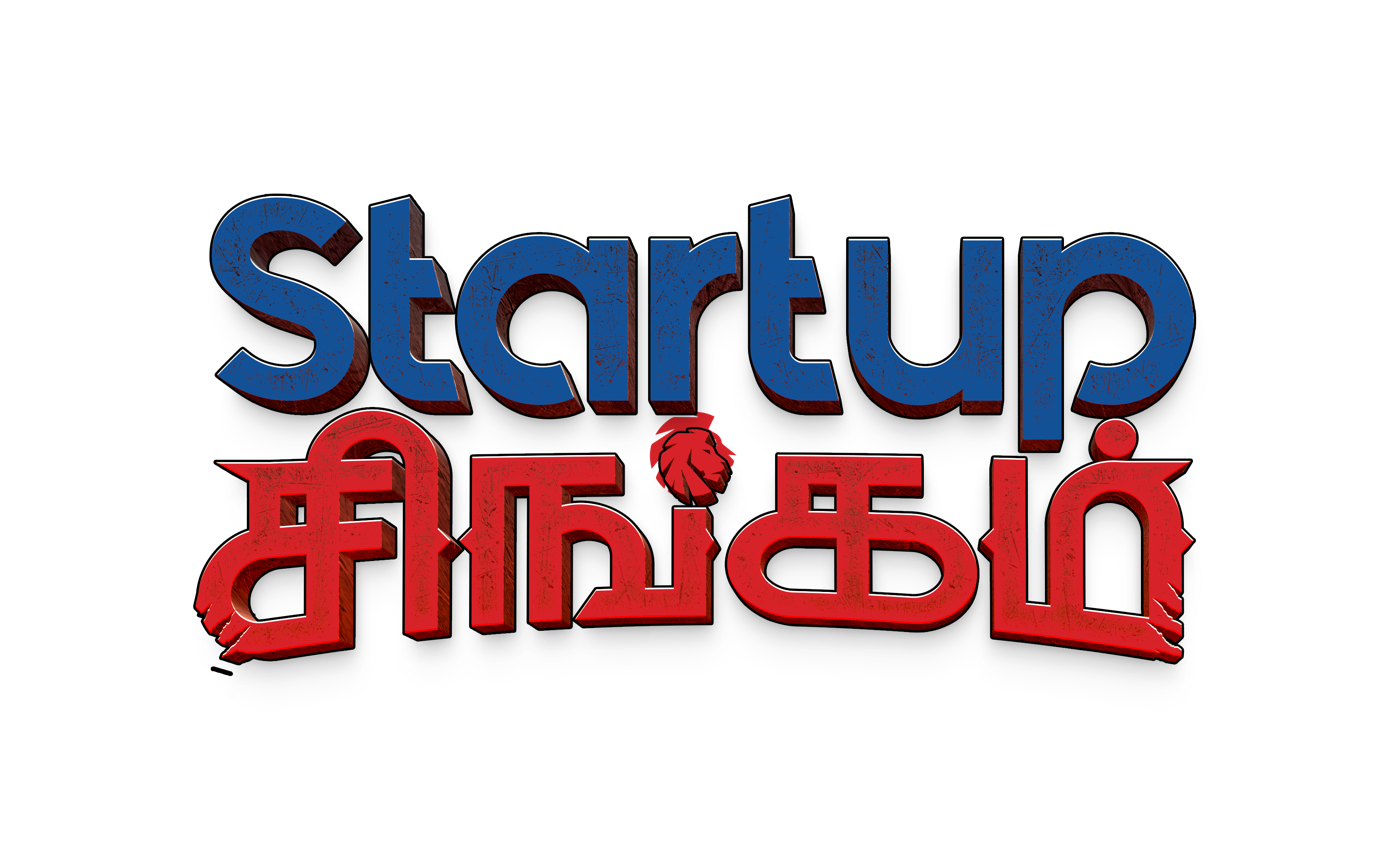
- Official logo of Startup Singam
- Genre: Business reality
- Country of origin: India
- Original language: Tamil
- No. of seasons: 2
- No. of episodes: 40

Production
- Executive producers: Hemachandran L & R Balachandar
- Producer: Baanhem Ventures Private Limited | BLUEKOI | Brand Avatar | Mudhal Partners

Original release
- Network: Star Vijay, Jio Hotstar
- Release: January 26, 2025 – present

Startup Singam is an Indian Tamil-language business reality television series that airs on Star Vijay every Sunday and streams digitally on JioHotstar. Produced by Baanhem Ventures Private Limited and conceived by founder Hemachandran L, the show features entrepreneurs from Tamil Nadu — referred to on the programme as "Singam" (meaning lion in Tamil) — who pitch their ventures to a panel of investors and industry leaders.

Startup Singam focuses on the South Indian entrepreneurial ecosystem and positions itself as a platform for Tamil Nadu-based founders to access capital, mentorship, and national visibility.

The first season premiered on 26 January 2025 — Republic Day — and featured 39 startups across 14 episodes, resulting in over ₹55 crore in investment commitments. The second season premiered on 25 January 2026, expanded to 26 episodes and 75 featured startups, with cumulative investment commitments reaching ₹115 crore after 20 episodes were filmed.

== Season 1 (2025) ==
=== Overview ===
Startup Singam Season 1 premiered on Star Vijay on 26 January 2025 — Republic Day — symbolising entrepreneurial independence, and concluded on 27 April 2025 across 14 episodes. The show was hosted by Angelin and was simultaneously made available for digital streaming on Disney+ Hotstar.

The season received over 1,500 applications from Tamil Nadu-based startups. Approximately 50 were shortlisted and 39 were ultimately featured across the 14 episodes. The season resulted in over ₹55 crore in total investment commitments, with notable startups including Raptee EV, Kaigal Jobs, Savemom, and Uru Custom Instruments.

The show was built around what its founders call the "Founders First Principle," in which the word SINGAM is interpreted as representing startup founders — not investors — reflecting the programme's mission of centering the entrepreneur in the investment conversation.

=== Season 1 Startups ===
Season 1 featured 39 startups from Tamil Nadu spanning sectors including electric vehicles, agri-tech, consumer goods, healthcare, and creative industries. Notable startups featured include Raptee EV, Kaigal Jobs, Savemom, and Uru Custom Instruments. A full episode-by-episode listing is available in the Events table below.

Notable deals

- Total investment commitments: ₹55 crore
- Startups featured: 39
- Notable deal: Keerthy Suresh invested ₹60 lakh in young entrepreneurs

No. in season		Original release date
1	Ariro Toys, Spaceman Craft, Goat Robotics	26 January 2025
2	Uru Custom Instruments Band, Atium Sports, YourTribe	2 February 2025
3	Chimertech Pvt Ltd, Fasgo, HVA Chemical Solutions	9 February 2025
4	Twisty Tails, The Mind and Company, Unibose	16 February 2025
5	Watsan, E-Sandhai, Nebeskie Labs	2 March 2025
6	Palm Era, Save Mom, Taxina	9 March 2025
7	Mannvasanai Traditional Food, Blinc, Happy Walk	16 March 2025
8	Keerai Kadai, Sacdeeil Aerospace, Graciss Femininity Napkins	23 March 2025
9	Polka Pop, Blue Island, Baby Amoré	30 March 2025
10	Goldpe, My Harvest Farms, Kaigal	6 April 2025
11	Mango Point, Aeronero, Geek Technology	13 April 2025
12	Tams Tribal Green Fuels, TN Tribal Mart, Arola	20 April 2025
13	Raptee, One Drop Wellness, Imedfurns	27 April 2025
14	-	27 April 2025
Finale and Award Ceremony

== Season 2 (2026) ==
=== Overview ===
Startup Singam Season 2 premiered on 25 January 2026 on Star Vijay and JioHotstar, hosted once again by Angelin, following the platform's rebranding from Disney+ Hotstar. The season was expanded to 26 episodes with a stated target of ₹100 crore in investment commitments, and an expanded mandate to attract founders from across India, not solely Tamil Nadu.

Season 2 received over 4,000 startup applications from across India, demonstrating significantly expanded national reach. 75 startups were selected for the 26-episode run. Cumulative investment commitments reached ₹115 crore after 20 episodes were filmed.

Kumar Vembu, co-founder of enterprise software company Zoho Corporation, served as Chief Mentor, lending the season significant credibility within the Indian startup ecosystem.

=== Season 2 Startups ===
Season 2 featured 75 startups from across India across sectors including robotics, medtech, agri-tech, AI, consumer goods, logistics, sustainability, and education. The expanded applicant pool of over 4,000 reflected Startup Singam's growing national profile beyond Tamil Nadu.

Total investment commitments (25 episodes, April 2026): ₹138.29 crore

No. in season		Original release date
1	Hayyan Farms Pvt Ltd, Rattai Handlooms, Kenesis	25 January 2026
2	Deyga, DhobiG / Cinkod Technologies, Soilsteps	1 February 2026
3	Preethi Wear, B-Arm Medical Technologies, SheSafe India	8 February 2026
4	Bio Dimension, Madras Sarees, Kiddy AI	15 February 2026
5	Sprint6, Visaiyon, VR Derma Private Limited	22 February 2026
6	Meetstream.ai, Robomiracle Technologies, Suprhost	1 March 2026
7	Robonetics Automation Solutions, Sirimiri, TAGCS Private Limited	8 March 2026
8	Putchi Nexus, Thremear, Vibis Royal Honey	15 March 2026
9	Solavio, Prompt View, Labs B&B Organics / Rare and Pure Specialities	22 March 2026
10	Vividobots, DailyGurus, LLM Artificial Intelligence	29 March 2026
11	Kal-M Robotics, Gaia Sustainable Solutions, Symbionic Technology	5 April 2026
12	ULOG 3, Kottravai, Alphageek Enterprises	12 April 2026
13	Vigyanlabs Innovations / Virtune, Recotap, Creedom AI / Billion Faces Technologies	19 April 2026
14	ScoutEdge, Nettyfish, Native Special Products	26 April 2026
15	R Soft, Kelvin6k Technologies, WEGoT Utility Solutions	3 May 2026
16	Shield X Syndicate, SQ Institute of Venture Building, Dhanyas	10 May 2026
17	Chittam Private Limited, Nellai Karupatti Coffee, Lab of Future India	17 May 2026
18	Farm Fresh Bangalore, Namma Office, Buyofuel / Buyo India	24 May 2026
19	Happy Ending Ice Creams, Happiegut Kefir, IMROBONIX	31 May 2026
20	KAPS Nextgen, Vetinstant Healthcare, Eastern Cottage Snacks	7 June 2026
21	Dextroware, Velectron, Primas	14 June 2026
22	Pulikachal, Hexite, Neurostellar	21 June 2026
23	Nura AI Labs, Pixla, SSVM Student Startups	28 June 2026
24	Syfero, Exoticamp, Dbyt (Tocal)	5 July 2026
25	Naturals Salon, Chenni Andavar Textiles, Petrocoat	12 July 2026
26	-	19 July 2026
Finale and Award Ceremony

== Investors ==
Investors of Startup Singam
Mudhal Partners
NAN (Native Angel Network)
Metis Family Office
JITO JIIF
Navyug Global Ventures
XB Group
Sthira Partners
Girish Mathrubootham
Shyam Sekhar
Aparna Thygarajan
Chinnakannan Sivasankaran

=== Notable Deals ===
Startup	Founder	Deal Size
Robonetics Automation Solutions	Prasanna	₹11 crore
Sirimiri	Rajan Srinivasan	₹10 crore
Buyofuel / Buyo India	Sumanth Kumar	₹5.7 crore
Alphageek	Ansha	₹5 crore
B-Arm Medical Technologies	Bharath	₹5 crore

== Startup Singam Ecosystem and Community ==
Beyond the television format, Startup Singam operates an ecosystem and incubation arm that serves startups who participate in the application process but are not selected to appear on the show. Recognising that a large number of viable ventures apply each season — over 4,000 in Season 2 alone — the programme channels these founders into a structured support pathway rather than leaving them without recourse.

=== Initiatives ===
- Season Prep BootCamp
- Season Pitch BootCamp
- Scale Hub Editions
- The Founder Room Edition
- Regional Ecosystem meet-ups
- Regional Startup Roadshow

== Industry Impact ==
Following Season 1, several direct-to-consumer brands that appeared on the show reportedly saw revenue growth of up to seven times after their episodes aired, driven by the combination of investor backing and national television exposure.

A notable example is Palm Era, founded by Kannan Hari, whose monthly revenues grew from ₹3–4 lakh to ₹50 lakh following the episode's broadcast.

The platform attracted government recognition: Dr T.R.B. Rajaa, Tamil Nadu's Industries Minister, served as Chief Guest at a Season 2 investor event.

Startup Singam is noted in Indian startup media for expanding access to investment capital beyond traditional hubs such as Bengaluru and Mumbai, connecting investors directly with Tamil Nadu-based and South Indian founders.

== Cultural Significance ==
Startup Singam is widely regarded as the first mainstream startup reality show in Tamil, focused specifically on the Tamil Nadu and broader South Indian entrepreneurial ecosystem.

The show differentiates itself through its "Founders First Principle" philosophy, regional language medium, and a deliberate focus on MSMEs, direct-to-consumer brands, and first-generation entrepreneurs from non-metropolitan backgrounds.

By Season 2, the show's application base had grown from 1,500 (Season 1) to over 4,000 applications from across India, reflecting expanded national recognition of the platform.
