= Poongatru Thirumbuma =

- Genre: Psychological thriller Drama
- Written by: Sathish Rajvade; Abijith Guru; Sativ Vishwasrav
- Screenplay by: V.N Saranavan; Subamanimala (dialogues)
- Directed by: Rajan Sundaram
- Starring: Shobanaa Uthaman; Sameer Ahamathu
- Theme music composer: Kiran
- Country of origin: India
- Original language: Tamil
- No. of seasons: 1
- No. of episodes: 183

Production
- Executive producer: Thirumalai
- Producer: Pradeep Narayanan
- Production location: Tamil Nadu
- Cinematography: Shivan Ilayaraja
- Editors: P.M Achuthan; G.P Karthik
- Camera setup: Multi-Camera
- Running time: approx. 22–24 minutes per episode
- Production company: Nexon Studios

Original release
- Network: Star Vijay
- Release: 28 April 2025 – 3 January 2026

Poongatru Thirumbuma is a 2025 Indian Tamil-language Psychological thriller drama television series starring Shobanaa Uthaman and Sameer Ahamathu in lead roles. It is produced by Pradeep Narayanan under the banner of Nexon Studios. The show premiered on Star Vijay on 28 April 2025 and ended with 183 episodes on 3 January 2026 and is also available on the digital platform JioHotstar.

== Plot ==
The series follows the story of Anandhi (Shobanaa Uthaman), is an unhappy marriage with Veerapathiran (Eshan Shyam), a controlling, obsessive, and abusive husband who is a psychologically unstable husband. She will to escape from his, but finds her peaceful new life with Kumaran (Sameer Ahamathu), interrupted when he discovers his actions and tracks her down.

== Cast ==
=== Main ===
- Shobanaa Uthaman as Anandhi
- Sameer Ahamathu as Kumaran

=== Supporting ===
- Eshan Shyam as Veerapathiran
- Anand Babu as Kasinathan
- Rhema Ashok as Akila
- Sujatha Panju / Priya as Kamatchi
- Nisha as Selvi
- Meenakshi Muruga as Lakshmi
- Tom Frank as Kotti
- Navya Suji as Gunavathi
- Gemini Mani as Manohar
- Jeganathan as Devarajan
- Muthulakshmi / Kiruba as Malathi
- Dev Anand as Anand
- Jairam as Kesavan

=== Special appearance ===
- Swetha
- Sharanya Turadi Sundarraj
- Venkat Renganathan

== Production ==
=== Development ===
The show was produced by Pradeep Narayanan under Nexon Studios. The series was director by Nee Naan Kaadhal fame Rajan Sundaram.

=== Casting ===
After Muthazhagu, Shobanaa Uthaman made a comeback through this series as "Anandhi", whilst Sameer Ahamathu was cast in the male lead role of Kumaran after his notable performances in Modhalum Kaadhalum. Malayalam Television actor Eshan Shyam made his Tamil debut as Veerapathiran. The series also reunited Shobanaa Uthaman and Anand Babu, who previously starred together one years before on Muthazhagu.

== Broadcast history ==
It began airing on Star Vijay on 28 April 2025 from Monday to Saturday at 18:30 (IST), replacing Mahanadhi. Starting on 6 October 2025, it shifted to the evening slot at 18:00 replacing Aaha Kalyanam (IST). It shifted to at 15:00.
