= Sharanya Turadi Sundarraj =

Tamil actress

- Born: 22 October 1987 (age 38); Madras (now Chennai), Tamil Nadu, India
- Occupation: Actress
- Years active: 2012 – Present
- Spouse: Rahul Sudarsan (m. 2024)

Sharanya Turadi Sundarraj (born 22 October 1987) is an Indian actress who predominantly appears in Tamil television shows. She became well known for her lead role in Star Vijay's soap opera Nenjam Marappathillai (2017–2019). She has also acted in some films such as Aayiram Muthangaludan Thenmozhi, Chennai Ungalai Anbudan Varaverkirathu, etc.

== Career ==
Sharanya joined as a television news presenter at the Tamil news channel Puthiya Thalaimurai. She worked as a news reporter for that television for over four years and also anchored a news program of film celebrities on Puthiya Thalaimurai channel. While working on Puthiya Thalaimurai, she got the chance to act in two movies; Chennai Ungalai Anbudan Varaverkirathu and Aayiram Muthangaludan Thenmozhi.

In recognition of her work, she was awarded the Puthiya Thalaimurai Thamizhan Award. After that, she quit her job and moved to London for a few months. Returning to India with an interest in acting in films, she joined News18 Tamil Nadu as a senior news reporter.

In the year 2015, she acted in the role of Vinodhini in the movie Chennai Ungalai Anbudan Varaverkirathu. Later, from 2017 to 2019, Sharanya played the role of Saranya Vikram in the serial Nenjam Marappathillai which aired on Vijay Television. The series was well received and she won the Vijay Television Debut Award for her performance.

After that, in 2019, she acted in the Telugu serial Roja which aired on Gemini TV. The series is a Telugu remake of Sun TV's serial Roja. In the same year, she played the role of 'Divya' in the serial Run on Sun TV. Popular small screen actor Krishna has acted opposite her. From Episode 86, Sharanya left the series and acted in the TV series Ayudha Ezhuthu which was aired on Vijay Television.

== Personal life ==
In 2024, Sharanya married her long-term boyfriend Rahul Sudarsan in a traditional Hindu wedding in Chennai.

== Television ==
=== Fiction ===
Year	Title	Role	Channel	Ref.
2013-2016	Mahabharatham	Paali	Sun TV	
2017–2019	Nenjam Marappathillai	Sharanya Vikram	Star Vijay	
2018	Chinna Thambi	Herself	Star Vijay	
2019	Roja	Roja	Gemini TV	Telugu serial
2019	Run	Dhivya	Sun TV	
2019–2020	Ayutha Ezhuthu	Indhira	Star Vijay	
2021–2022	Vaidhegi Kaathirundhaal	Vaidehi a.k.a. Poornima	Star Vijay	
2024–present	Pandian Stores 2	Thangamayil	Star Vijay	
2025	Poongatru Thirumbuma	Herself	Star Vijay	

=== Non-fiction ===
Year	Title	Role	Channel	Notes
2012–2015	News	Newsreader	Puthiya Thalaimurai	
2016	News	Senior News Reporter	News18 Tamil Nadu	
2021	Start Music season 2	Contestant	Star Vijay	Episode 21
2023–2024	Dance Jodi Dance Reloaded Season 2	Celebrity Partner	Zee Tamil	Along with Nagaraj
2024	Start Music season 5	Contestant	Star Vijay	Episode 4
2024	Stars Diary	Herself	Star Vijay	On 18 July
2024	Athu Ithu Ethu Season 3	Contestant	Star Vijay	Episode 16
2024	Cooku with Comali season 5	Guest	Star Vijay	Episodes 41 and 42

== Films ==
Year	Title	Role	Notes
2012	Aayiram Muthangaludan Thenmozhi	Akshara	
2015	Chennai Ungalai Anbudan Varaverkirathu	Vinodhini	
2019	Enn 4		
2020	Miruna	Miruna	Short film
