= Pandian Stores 2 =

2023 Indian Tamil language TV series

- Genre: Family; Drama
- Created by: Priya Thambi
- Written by: Priya Thambi; Dialogue; Gireesh
- Screenplay by: Priya Thambi; Vasudevan
- Directed by: V.C. Ravi (Episode 1-84); I.David (Episode 85-present)
- Starring: Stalin Muthu; Nirosha; VJ Kathirvel; Sharanya Turadi; Venkat Renganathan; Hema Rajkumar; Akash Premkumar; Shalini Prabhu
- Country of origin: India
- Original language: Tamil
- No. of seasons: 2
- No. of episodes: 900

Production
- Producers: K. Jayalakshmi; Venus Infotainment
- Cinematography: R. Bala Gurunathan; V.Venkatesh; V.Shakthi; T.Vinoth Nathan
- Editor: Parithiselvan
- Camera setup: Multi-camera
- Running time: 22 minutes
- Production company: Venus Infotainment

Original release
- Network: Star Vijay
- Release: 30 October 2023 – present

Related
- Pandian Stores

Pandian Stores 2 – Thandhai Sollmikka Manthiramilai (transl. Pandian Stores 2 – Nothing Is Greater Than Father's Words) is a 2023 Indian Tamil language soap opera directed by V.C. Ravi and it is a spiritual spin-off of the 2018 series Pandian Stores, starring emsemble cast Stalin Muthu, Nirosha, VJ Kathirvel, Sharanya Turadi, Venkat Renganathan, Hema Rajkumar, Akash Premkumar, Shalini Prabu, and others. It was premiered on 30 October 2023.

== Plot ==
The non-screened flashback: Pandian works as a laborer in Muthuvel-Sakthivel Grocery Shop. He falls in love with their only sister Gomathi and they elope and get married. Their children include Kuzhali, Saravanan, Senthilnathan, Kathiravan, and Arasi. Pandian and Muthuvel-Sakthivel hold grudges against each other due to their earlier conflicts. Pandian runs a grocery store named "Pandian Stores" and wants to succeed. He expects obedience from his children. Gomathi's youngest brother Pazhanivel stays with them as he loves his sister's family. Pandian later builds a house in front of Muthuvel-Sakthivel house, irritating them.

On screen story: Fights and Betrayal first begin when Senthil, the second son of Pandian, elopes and marries his girlfriend, Meena, with his younger brother, Kathiravan, facilitating the commitment. When they return to their house, Kathir reveals that he had asked the couple to marry, causing Pandian to kick Kathir out of the house while Senthil and Meena still reside there. Meena works as a government employee, and she befriends Raji, the only daughter of the Muthuvel-Sakthivel family. Meena's parents still hold grudges against Meena, with their fights often in the local bus stop.

Raji falls in love with a wasteful scoundrel or her college classmate, Kannan, and continues to be in a relationship with him despite Kathir's warnings. Few days later, Muthuvel and Vadivu, Raji's mother, arranges a marriage for their daughter with a wealthy family in spite of Raji's plea to stop her nuptial processes. Upon hearing this, Kannan threatens self-harm if Raji doesn't marry him, causing Raji to elope with him to a hotel in Tiruchandur. Prior to this, Gomathi, Meena and Kathir decide to go the same place, Tiruchandur, to visit temples and for peace. There, they meet Baakiyalakshmi, Ezhil and Amritha and they become friends. Gomathi and Meena also help them out in their catering order on the go. Baakiyalakshmi also spots Raji and Kannan often fighting, until one night Kannan reveals his ulterior motives in marrying Raji and steals all of her gold. She later uncovers that Raji is Gomathi's relative, and furious, Gomathi confronts Raji for making a foolish decision and arranges her marriage with her youngest son, Kathiravan. By force, Kathir marries Raji and they go back to Kunnakkudi, where they live, leaving both the Vels and Pandian's family in shock. When Maari, Sakthi's wife and the rest asks for the jewels she took, Kathir saves Raji and conceals the truth saying that he sold all the gold. In anguish, Muthuvel and others in his family break ties with Raji, whil. A devastated Raji then goes on a mission to track Kannan and find her lost jewels, but sadly fails. Even so, Meena becomes supportive of Raji and acts like an elder sister to her.

Meanwhile, Saravanan's marriage comes up, but is often rejected by families assuming that he has a problem since his other brothers had already gotten married. Dejected, Saravanan decides to live monastic life, away from marriage or having kids. Luckily, a matrimonial event, makes him meet Thangamayil and her family who they think is self-respectful, respected and wealthy. His marriage gets fixed with Thangamayil, but the reality is quite different. It is later revealed that Thangamayil was a young girl who did not get grooms, due to her incomplete education and the poorness of her family. To get her married to Saravanan, they lie saying that she had completed M.A. English Literature, the whole of 80 pounds of gold that was given as dowry was real metal, and that she is two years younger than Saravanan. After all hurdles, Saravanan weds Mayil.

On the other hand, Kathir works part-time at a food-delivery service to make money for Raji's needs and also sometimes acts as a driver. Afterwards, he gives part of his salary to the family as Pandian secretly questions his financial contribution to the family. Raji pities Kathir and this pity later turns into love in between them. Few weeks later, Meena and Senthil go on a trip to Chennai for her job's training while also spending quality time alone. To help Kathir, Raji starts a tuition business which also fails as Thangamayil reveals it to the family, with Bagyam, her mother's, insistence. She later gets nosy around house matters and tries to gain supremacy, making Gomathi, Meena and Raji irritated. Mayil finds herself prioritized in the house as she pleases Pandian, annoying Gomathi and also exposing things supposed to be done in secrecy, including Meena and Senthil's beach trip. In addition to that, Bagyam tells her to break the good bond between Gomathi, Raji and Meena, as Mayil gets worried about Gomathi, Raji and Meena's gossips about her. To comfort Thangamayil, Saravanan takes her on a honeymoon trip where she rents an expensive hotel unknowingly. She initially, thinks that the money on screen she saw during confirmation was the amount of money required to rent it, but later realises that it was the advance amount for the same. Helpless, they request their brothers for help and they manage to arrange the required amount – with Kathir stealing Pandian's saved money that wasn't supposed to be tampered with. After a few days, when Pandian realises the loss of money from his account, he decides to kick Kathir out of the house again but Sarvanan saves him by revealing the purpose behind the theft causing the entire house except Meena and Raji to halt speaking with her. A similar problem before this had happened when Sakthivel, Raji's relative, finds out about Raji teaching kids and teens at their homes causing a huge conflict between Kathir, Gomathi, Pandian and Raji, and also between Senthil and Meena as she says that her tuition business was known to Meena and that she was the one who facilitated it. Days later, things resolve and Senthil and Meena, Raji and Kathir, and Meena, Raji and Gomathi reconcile. Senthil also opts and becomes determined to get a government job upon seeing the anger Janardhan and Shanti hold against their daughter, Meena.

On the other hand, Muthuvel finds out that for Saravanan's marriage, Vadivu had given some of her gold jewels to Raji and tries to kick Vadivu but doesn't on Gomathi and Gandhimathi's insistence. Yet, they still fight for the same issue, but sometime later they also reconcile, when her jewels gets returned by Pandian's family. Kumar then receives a marriage proposal but Raji spoils it by telling that before Saravanan's marriage, Kumar had kidnapped Raji and Meena with hope to stop Saravanan's marriage. But then, they state that Thanagamayil was the actual victim of the kidnapping plot. On the table, Sakthivel blabbers to Muthuvel of Kumar's ruined life due to Raji's elopement causing chaos in Raji's house. During so, Gandhimathi faints due to an acid reflux which the family thinks was due to the havoc they created. She gets admitted to the hospital, leaving both the families in shock, but things turn out good when Gandhimathi gains consciousness with no serious illness. Yet, she requests the nurses and doctors to allow her to stay in the hospital premises for another 3 days to escape her sons' constant fight. While in the hospital, Kathir makes Gomathi and Raji meet Gandhimathi and they reunite though Vadivu still is in anguish with Raji's marriage.

Prior to these incidents, Raji demands Gomathi to get her permission to continue tutoring students, but she fails. So, Raji, herself speaks to Pandian and obtains permission for the same. On the go, Senthil also finishes his exam he needs to pass to be a government employee. One day, Raji accidentally spots Kannan on the streets and chases him but he escapes. As a last resort, Kathir and Raji file a complaint to the police against Kannan and her lost jewels weighing over 100 pounds. Few months later, the police manages to return most of Raji's jewels which Kathir asks to return them back to her family. Following the complaint, Pandian plans a Thali Perukkal Ceremony for Thangamayil-Saravanan, Meena-Senthil, and Kathir-Raji. To Thangamayil's misfortune, Raji and Meena accidentally discover that out of the 80 pound jewels that was given to Pandian's family as dowry, only 8 pounds of them were real gold and that the rest was fake. Further, on considering Thangamayil's plight, they decide to hide it from Pandian. A day later, Pandian and Gomathi and their sons find about the issue between Kuzhali, their elder sister and her husband, Anbu and gets shocked to hear that Kuzhali had been misbehaving at her husband's house, and forces her to go back.

Meanwhile, during Kathir's driving round, he gets to know that a girl in his round is being harassed by two other boys but Kathir, cleverly devises a plan and saves her. Unfortunately, Kathir is dragged to the police station with a false allegation for the same issue and the officials beat him hardly mistaking him for the persons who were trying to kidnap her or harass her. He gets bailed out of the police station after some time and he becomes an internet sensation. Two days later, Gandhimathi tries to go to Gomathi's house in an urge to see Kathir's situation but gets scolded by her sons Muthuvel and Sakthivel for betraying the oath of the Vels family.

To take revenge against Pandian, Sakthivel forces Kumar to marry Arasi, and he makes his first attempts to talk to Arasi but fails as Raji complaints about it to Muthuvel. He then tries to launch a bunch of goons to harass Arasi, so that he has a chance to come and save her and therefore, a chance to make Arasi fall in love with Kumar. But, his plan goes downhill as Palani and Senthil thrash them. Meanwhile, Thangamayil, to save herself from being forced to get a job, leaves the door of Pandian's house open for her father, Manickam, to steal her documents and fake jewels. Sadly, the solution doesn't go as it should and instead he goes to the wrong house and gets caught by Sakthivel. Accusing him of theft, he hands Manickam to the police but Bhaagyam tricks the police, claiming Manickam entered Sakthi's house while trying to wish Thangamayil for her so-called birthday. She also lies to Pandian that they lost Thangamayil's educational certificates, much to Mayil's worry. Not only that, despite the lie, Pandian still manage to get her a job as a teacher with his well-known school correspondent.

Later, Palanivel, Gomathi's brother's, marriage talk comes in, and he meets his potential groom Manjula with Pandian's support but they cancel the alliance and their engagement reasoning that Palanivel is just a laborer in Pandian Stores with no personal assets. On a confrontation by Palanivel and Gomathi and Pandian with the Vels family about this, Muthu offers to find a perfect bride for Palani if he returns to his house. To make this successful, Gandhimathi pleads with Pandian to force Palani to go to her house which he does. Just a few moments later, he goes back to Gomathi's house unable to find satisfaction with Muthuvel and Sakthivel.

Before Palani's marriage, Kathiravan finds out about Raji's unfulfilled ambition to become a police officer, and encourages her decision and her tries for it. He takes her to the field everyday so that she trains herself to run faster and better. He also helps her train for the upcoming police examination by collecting PYQs, study materials and other details about the exam including where it happened, how will the questions be asked etc. He also buys her the necessary equipment for her to run in the ground, like sports shoes and buying her a track suit. To the couple's agitation, Pandian learns about these, and warns them to stop. But, Kathir stands by Raji opposing Pandian's attempts to stop her dreams. After celebrating Pongal, Kathir also informs Pandian that they will go to Chennai to go to Kathir's best friend's so-called marriage, when in reality they were actually going to write the TNUSRB exam for Raji's sub-inspector job. Afterwards, to escape the correspondent's torture for Mayil's certificates, Mayil deceives Pandian saying that she had found a better job and liked working there as compared to her working as a teacher. In reality, she actually worked as a supplier at a hotel, while also answering and dealing with Pandian and his sons who frequently visited the restaurant as it was well-known to them. Simultaneously, Meena faces pressure from a colleague to withdraw her complaint against Sakthivel's property dispute but with the help of head officials, she manages to retrieve the same, enraging Sakthivel and Kumar.

After huge hurdles, Pandian manages to fix Palani's marriage warning the bride's family about Sakthivel and Muthuvel's misdeeds to stopping Palani's marriage. But even so, they somehow halt the marriage by lying that Palani could not have a baby. At the last minute, they bring up Suganya, Maari's relative, and asks Palani to wed her. After a lot of hesitation, Palani marries Suganya and they move out of Pandian's house to Muthuvel's. Not even after a week, Suganya and Palani move back to Pandian's house. She later learns about Sakthi and Kumar's nefarious aim to wed Arasi as revenge against Pandian, and supports the plan. Kumar then meets Arasi, explaining his so-called love, how it would greatly impact both the families positively, and his dreams to marry her. Considering this, Arasi subtly smiles at him showing that she accepted his love. Arasi begins to return home late and gives unusual responses when her family questions her. On top of this, Suganya provokes Arasi about how good Kumar is as a person, and how madly he is in love with Arasi leading to her further closeness with Kumar. Suganya also behaves extremely aggressive and rude to Palani, complaining about his snores, making him do house chores, and often ashaming him for being an unpaid worker at Pandian Stores. At the same time, Meena's father Ravi suffers a heart attack worrying Meena. There, Meena reunites with her parents and Senthil promises Ravi he will earn a government job. On the other hand, Raji reveals the mystery behind her lost jewels and how Kathir didn't steal it and said so to prevent unnecessary questions and fear amongst family members. Kathir then asks Pandian not to oppose Raji's dreams of becoming a police, on behalf of her.

Days pass, and Suganya persuades Arasi to go to the theatre and watch a movie with Kumar. Arasi then agrees, only after Suganya explains that she will come with her too. But, at the theatre, Suganya lies of having a headache and leaves Arasi alone with Kumar. They both watch the movie, and unfortunately Saravanan spots them together after which Kumar reveals their love. Saravanan angrily beats Kumar up, and exposes the matter to the house leaving Pandian and Gomathi humiliated by Sakthivel's family while also facing betrayal from their most lovely daughter. Arasi then consoles Pandian, her brothers and her mother promising that never will she talk to Kumar nor meet him. Gomathi also gets assurance from Muthuvel that Kumar will never cross paths with Arasi. In an effort to fix her life, Pandian fixes Arasi's marriage with his elder sister, Umayal's son, Sadeesh and stuns the family by fixing her engagement with Sadeesh though knowing that she hasn't completed her studies yet. On the other side, Sakthivel plots Arasi's fate as this issue gets revealed to Kumar. To facilitate their plan, Suganya again makes Kumar meet Arasi but Senthil and Meena arrive at just the right time, confronting both Suganya and Kumar. They later tell this to Palani, who also fights with Suganya. But, to escape from facing the wrath of everybody in Pandian's home, she lies that Palani misbehaved with her causing Palanivel to get stuck in great trouble. Meanwhile, to support Arasi's studies, Meena meets Sadeesh and asks him to let her study after marriage and to her happiness, he agrees. On the same day, Umayal visits Pandian and asks for a car as dowry for the marriage, to which he agrees despite knowing that it is way beyond his means. Days later, Gomathi plans a 3-day trip to Ambasamudram where they would visit temples. She obtains permission from Pandian to let her, Meena, Arasi, Raji and Thangamayil to go.

Thangamayil, sadly, gets herself in a fix, as Saravanan finds out that she works at a hotel instead of an office that she had spoken of. He then doubts why Thangamayil had worked here, to which she apologizes. Right after, Gomathi and gang leave for the trip, and during the trip, she calls Saravanan multiple times and states that if she had gotten her educational certificates back, especially her college certificate, problems would solve. She becomes even more anxious when Saravanan asks for her academic details to obtain a so-called duplicate certificate, due to which she leaves early again lying that she had left only because her office leave got cut.

At and before the trip, Arasi fails to talk to Sadeesh properly as she is devastated about the recent mishaps, and about misleading him. But, throughout her marriage dilemma, Meena and Raji support her and asks her to make the right decisions. Filled with guilt, Arasi reveals her past with Kumar to Sadeesh and refuses to hide it from him. But, to her plight, he doesn't get angry at her and instead consoles her. Meanwhile, Raji, while at a temple, sees a poster of a dance contest happening inside of its premises and takes the help of Meena to convince Gomathi in letting her participate. Her real intentions was to actually buy a bike for Kathir he had always dreamt of. Her plan slightly deviates when Gomathi decides to not let her participate in the second round of the contest fearing Pandian, but Meena manages to calm Gomathi down anyhow. Back at Kunnakudi, Kumar plans to visit Ambasamudram and take Arasi away by force, which he does. Luckily, Meena, Raji and Gomathi arrive and Kumar falls unconscious once Meena hits him at the back of the head with a pan. Meena feared the worst as Kumar wasn't breathing but the movement of his finger confirmed that he wasn't dead. Kathir and Senthil arrive shortly after and Kumar escapes the both of them. On the other hand, Raji wins second place in the dance contest successfully winning a bike for Kathir.

Meanwhile, Muthuvel advises Sakthivel to get Meena dismissed from her job and as part of this, they file a fake complaint against Meena saying that she encourages bribery and such unlawful actions. Not only that, they set up a person who by force bribes Meena with money to get his task done, and right then and there, government officials come in and tries to arrest Meena. Fortunately, she records the entire happening on her phone and shows it to the officials leading to the arrest of that customer.

After Kathir's bike arrives, Saravanan takes Mayil to a college that she said had obtained a degree from but she later confesses that she never attended college. In anguish, Saravanan tells Thangamayil that their relationship is over, yet agrees to hide her lies till Arasi's marriage. On the flip side, Kumar asks his friend to morph fake pictures of him and Arasi. He then used these to blackmail Arasi threatening that he will post it all around the village and show it to the groom's family, shaking Arasi. She tries hard to reveal his threat to the family but fails with people, including Meena and Senthil noticing her restlessness assuming that it was just marital tension. On the day before her marriage, Kumar demands an apology from Arasi, using Suganya as a provoker or a facilitator, in person to avoid her and her family's embarrassment. Fearing the loss of dignity of her family, she meets Kumar but his goons come out of nowhere. They kidnap Arasi and Kumar threatens to marry her with a nuptial chain, but later decides not to. He goes on to let her in her house only on the day of the marriage holding her the entire night hostage. Meanwhile, Arasi's disappearance in her house worries Gomathi, her family and Umayal's family. Kumar arrives shortly after, lying to Pandian that Arasi desperately came for him, crying that she didn't want to live without him despite him warning that Arasi's family might be searching for her. To protect family honour, Arasi lies of eloping and enters Kumar's house, devastating Gomathi, Pandian, their sons and their in-laws. Even so, Meena and Raji grow doubtful of Arasi's marriage and takes the help of Palanivel to meet Arasi. She spits out the truth behind her marriage, yet makes them promise to not reveal this truth. Meena later confronta Suganya of her actions and warns her. In an effort to protect Arasi, Raji also takes essential steps by talking to her father tricking him of how Arasi's torture by Kumar would anger Kathir, and in turn get herself in trouble.

Thereafter, Saravanan drops Mayil at her house, stating that she will live here from now on, causing her to be in extreme anguish. At his home, Meena finds out from Suganya about the undocumented money in Muthuvel's house. She informs the income tax department about the same and they raid their house and their mill, seizing all of the undocumented assets. Arasi, on the other hand, faces violent behavior from Kumar, including how he tried to leave her in a deserted place, insulting her in front of Pandian, leaving her unattended at a clothing store and also assaulting her for invalid reasons. But, to her talents, she swiftly escapes from all of these hurdles, either by defending herself, by attacking back, by creating drama or by outsmarting him. Following this, it is revealed to Pandian's family that Thangamayil was pregnant leading to her return to the house.

Meanwhile, Senthil, in an aim to get a government job, steals the 10 Lakh rupees needed for him to get the job since he couldn't pass the exam required. When this was revealed to Meena, she scolds Senthil and he then finds himself in a predicament as Pandian asks for that money back due to Umayal's demand for the return of the money spent for Sadeesh and Arasi's marriage. Distressed, Senthil turns to Kathir for the money, but that fails. He then turns to Meena, who lashes out at him making this plan also fail. But, Meena, secretly took a loan to help out Senthil and timed it just right to save Senthil from trouble. She gave the money to Pandian and solved the issues. To Senthil's surprise, he gets a government job in the Public Works Department, leaving the entire family on cloud nine. But, the happiness fades quickly as Ravi reveals that Senthil had paid 10 Lakhs to get the job, and had not earned it by passing the government examinations. Knowing this, Pandian and Gomathi stop talking to Meena or Senthil. One night, at dinner, Senthil gets furious at Pandian for insulting Meena and hits him with harsh words. Gomathi, then consoles him and provides solace to him, asking to avoid those words. To make up for his actions, Senthil also buys gifts for everyone with his salary.

Kathir enrols Raji for police exam training, and Raji stands by Kathir when he reveals that he wants a loan to start his travels business. She joins him in the bank proposal meeting, while also secretly trying to fund his business. Meanwhile, on a confrontation between Kuzhali, Kathir, Meena and Kumar when they spotted him with another girl, Arasi interrupts and provides the truth behind their marriage. Pandian, upon hearing this, goes to Muthu's house and brings Arasi home, asking people there to tell the truth fearlessly. It is later revealed by Meena and Raji, about how Suganya provoked Arasi to a relationship with Arasi and how she played a role in Arasi's date and fake marriage to Kumar. Enraged, Gomathi slaps Suganya with Palanivel harshly interrogating her. Later, Pandian files a police complaint against Kumar and about his torture to Arasi, leading to Kumar's arrest and a rising storm inside of Muthuvel's house. His arrest is followed by Thangamayil's attention seeking practices and also by Maari and Gandhimathi pleading with Gomathi, Raji and Pandian to withdraw the case against Kumaravel, with all of them failing.

Meanwhile, in an attempt to pay for Kathir's travels business, Raji tries to sell all of her gold but is spotted by Sakthivel, who with Muthuvel, joins forces and humiliates Pandian's family. During the confrontation, Raji reveals the truth behind her marriage and apologises to Pandian. Upon learning this, Muthuvel and Vadivu go to Pandian's house asking for Raji's return to their house but Raji refuses, touched by the love and support of Pandi's family. It is later revealed in the story, that Thangamayil wasn't actually pregnant and that the tester showed a false pregnancy. At home, Saravanan accuses Mayil of deceiving his entire family and ends their marital relationship, while being consoled by Pandian and Gomathi.

On the other hand, Pandian tries his best to convince Kathir in being helped by him to obtain the loan but he solemnly refuses. Now, since Raji's idea to sell her jewels to help out Kathir failed she plots to participate in a dance competition in Chennai, win the prize money of 10 Lakh rupees and fund Kathir's dream. But, Kathir declines and does not let her go to Chennai. She later turns to Pandian, who also quotes the same, making her helpless. Determined, she decides to go alone but her plan backfires as the dance masters and the environment turn out to be extremely weird, with some trying to harass her. When Raji shows signs of being in trouble, Kathir travels all the way to Chennai, thrashes those officials and saves Raji. But, she gets mocked by Pandian and Gomathi, after returning halfway through the trip.

Arasi's court hearings come up, and she had always spoken against Kumar there, but when she sees Gandhimathi devastated, she decides to dismiss the case and withdraws it, freeing Kumar. He then falls at Arasi's feet seeking forgiveness. Afterwards, being unemployed, Thangamayil and Manickam decide to work at Pandian's store where they steal money there, much to Saravanan's sight, infuriating him. On the other hand, Senthil decides to take Meena and live separately from his parents at the quarters Meena had talked about despite her and Senthil's family's declining his idea. Senthil doesn't budge and the both move in to their new house, where Meena feels isolated and cornered without her in-laws' presence. Ever since then, Meena doesn't behave that good to Senthil anymore. Following this, comes up Gandhimathi's birthday. Muthuvel, Sakthivel and Kumar decide to celebrate it in a grand manner, but Sakthi refuses to invite Pandian and his family due to past grudges. But, with Gandhimathi's request, Muthuvel, Kumar and Sakthi agree to let them come. Later, things go down when Kumar forgets to order food for the audience in Gandhimathi's birthday celebration. Fortunately, Pandian calls everybody inside and asks them to eat the food Kathir had ordered, thereby completing Gandhi's birthday.

Saravanan still holds anger and grudges against Thangamayil and her family, and Palanivel gets accused of the theft of money from Pandian's store and also gets treated badly. Few days later, Diwali comes up and the two families enjoy festive laughter. But, after the feast, Saravanan discovers Thangamayil's age and finds out her next lie. He learns that she isn't two years younger than him, but two years older than him, leaving him even more betrayed. Simultaneously, Gandhimathi talks to Gomathi and Pandian about Palanivel starting his own shop. He then meets Palanivel and encourages to start one of his own. But, his elder brothers go on with the processes for Palani's shop even without Palani's knowledge. He's later shocked to acknowledge that Sakthivel and Muthuvel built him a shop just next to Pandian's store, named Gandhimathi Stores. Pandian later becomes furious with Palanivel about this, and kicks him out of the house, leaving him in deep despair. Thangamayil then tells Gomathi that Saravanan hadn't been behaving with her properly lately and asks her to resolve the disputes in between them, enraging him further. One day, Saravanan erupts as a volcano and reveals all of Thangamayil's deceits. Pandian and his family becomes betrayed just as Saravanan and regret their trust. They lash out at Thangamayil and expels her out of the house with her parents, causing her to feel great heartbreak. The next day, she comes back and furious at her return, Gomathi calls Mayil's parents who confronts Pandian's family badly, and during the conflict, Sakthivel interrupts and urges Mayil's family to file a case against Pandian's family stating that they had tortured Mayil for dowry, thereby widening the fight even more. Baagyam's family walk away after she threatens legal action. She curses Pandian's family and in tears, she says that the peacefulness of the family had been destroyed that day.

Much to Mayil's plight, Saravanan sends a divorce notice to her, leaving her deeply cut. In retaliation, Baagyam files a police complaint against Pandian and his family with Dowry Domestic Violence, sending Gomathi, Pandian and most of their children to prison. Pandian, Gomathi, Saravanan, Kathir and Senthil finally gets bailed out of jail with Muthuvel and Sakthivel's help, followed by the reconcilement of the two families. A few days later, Thangamayil is dragged to the police station by her mother, where Bhagyam lies to the police that the jewelry Mayil had bought to the house had been replaced with fake replacements, when it was in reality fake jewellery. On top of this, she blames Pandian's family for taking all of the gold for their own profits and replacing it with covering jewelry. Bhagyam, in addition to this, forces Mayil to repeat the same, but out of Meena and Raji's pressure, she unveils the truth, angering Bhagyam. She later tries to kick Mayil out of the house, but her father stops her.

Afterwards, Gomathi invites her brothers for a family lunch. Though they initially disagree, they agree to the feist upon Gandhimathi's request. However, the lunch turns chaotic as Sakthivel speaks ill about Kathir, and about his marriage to Raji. In rage, Gomathi reveals the truth behind Kathir and Raji's marriage, including her and Meena's involvement in the same. Sakthivel and Muthuvel, furious, lashes out at Gomathi and leaves the house in anger. Pandian, on the other hand, is shocked to learn the truth and avoids speech with Gomathi. Senthil, also, is angered and throws it out on Meena. Though Senthil and Meena soon reunite, Pandian remains in his state of not speaking to Gomathi.

Post the chaos, Kathir and Raji visit Chennai for her training course for police. There, they share alone and romantic moments with each other, visiting the beach, having a feast at a restaurant and nights together. On the flip side, things turn vigorous for Thangamayil as Bhagyam rudely interrogates her and throws her out of the house. In vain, she goes to Saravanan who retells the same, causing Mayil to try and attempt suicide. Fortunately, Meena arrives at the right time saving Thangamayil and her life. She advises Mayil to be resilient and resistant towards the adversities she'd face and lends some money to Bhagyam and Mayil. Simultaneously, Muthuvel arrives with a marriage proposal for Kumar, who is willing to reject it for Arasi. On behalf of Kumar, Gandhimathi stops his engagement, causing Sakthivel to kick Gandhimathi out of their house. Gomathi, then, takes her inside and requests her to live with her.

Thangamayil, again, meets with another turning point in her life as she and Meena learn that she is pregnant. In glee, she decides to meet Saravanan and tell him the news, but he wasn't ready to believe it and questioned who the child belonged to. He then declared that even if she was pregnant, there would be no ties between the child and himself. Mayil's happiness turned to pain in the blink of an eye and after reaching home, she conveys to Meena and her parents about leaving Saravanan and raising her child as a single mother. Bhagyam tries to change Mayil's mind but she doesn't budge and threatens to kill herself if Bhagyam or her father goes to Saravanan's house trying to tell them about her pregnancy. At the same time, Saravanan befriends his ex named Anjali alias Devi, and speaks to her about his personal life and conflicts with his wife. At Gomathi's house, Gandhimathi, while Gomathi and Meena are away on their trip to Srirangam, puts Gomathi's phone on silent, and throws up a tantrum saying that Gomathi had run away from home as a result of Pandian not speaking with the latter. However, things turn chaotic when Gomathi returns home in proper form. Following her return, Pandian lashes out at Gomathi for leaving the house without acknowledging anybody, which later turns into a big fight in between the both of them. Afterwards, Pandian asks his sons Senthil and Kathir to repay the 10 lakhs he gave to each one of them after they spoke ill about Pandian.

Meanwhile, Thangamayil's parents decide to confront Pandian's family after Manickam spotted Saravanan talking with Anjali. The two arrived at Pandian's house and accused Saravanan of having an extramarital affair, due to which, in rage, Saravanan slaps Manickam. Thangamayil, on the other hand, suspects her parents and goes to Saravanan's house and drags the both of them from the latter's house as Bhagyam tried to inform Gomathi and Pandian about Thangamayil's pregnancy. Later that day, Pandian asks Saravanan about Anjali and in reply, he says that he doesn't and won't develop any feelings for Anjali.

Pandian still is in a rift with Gomathi, but things take a turn in their life together as Gomathi faints due to low BP. Gomathi gets admitted in the hospital and gets discharged very soon. A bit before she became unconscious, Gomathi had called for help to Pandian, but he left her there, thinking that it was just another act she performed to try and get Pandian talk. The latter, later, feels guilty about his actions and shares his devastation with Saravanan. The day post her discharge, she gives up control of the house and leaves, complaining of disrespect she earns inside of the premises. Pandian, tries to convince Gomathi to come back, and follows her in each turn she takes. Finally, Gomathi and Pandian reconcile and come to the house as a united couple.

Back in Muthuvel's house, a shocking turn occurs as Muthuvel battles with cancer. Right after he walks out of the doctor's office, a suspicious and curious Kathir walks in and asks him what his medical issue was. He later feels devastated upon learning that Muthuvel was battling cancer. He speaks to the latter and assures to stand by him and accompany him on his trip to Trichy for treating his tumor.

Senthil, on the other side, learns about Meena's hidden relation with Thangamayil and confronts her on the same. He raises the issue towards his parents, who interrogate Meena in more detail. There, she reveals Mayil's preganancy and Saravanan's harsh reaction towards it. The recent promo released by Vijay Television ends with Gomathi slapping Saravanan for his ill-actions.

== Cast ==
=== Main ===
- Stalin Muthu as Pandian: (2023−present)
  - Gomathi's husband; Kuzhali, Saravanan, Senthil, Kathiravan and Arasi's father
- Nirosha as Gomathi Pandian: (2023−present)
  - Pandian's wife; Kuzhali, Saravanan, Senthil, Kathiravan and Arasi's mother;
  - Gandhimathi's daughter; Muthuvel and Sakthivel's younger sister and Pazhanivel's elder sister
- VJ Kathirvel Kandasamy as Saravanan Pandian: (2023−present)
  - Pandian and Gomathi's eldest son; Kuzhali 's younger brother, Senthil, Kathiravan and Arasi's elder brother; Thangamayil's Ex-husband
  - Gandhimathi's grandson; Muthuvel, Sakthivel and Pazhanivel's nephew; Kumaravel's and Raaji's cousin
- Sharanya Turadi Sundarraj as Thangamayil Saravanan " Mayil": (2024−present)
  - Saravanan's Ex-wife; Muthu Sudar's sister; Manickam and Bakiyam's elder daughter
- Vasanth Vasi (2023–2024) / Venkat Renganathan (July 2024–present) as Senthilnathan Pandian "Senthil":
  - Pandian and Gomathi's second son; Kuzhali, Saravanan's younger brother, Kathiravan and Arasi's elder brother; Meena's husband
  - Gandhimathi's grandson; Muthuvel, Sakthivel and Pazhanivel's nephew; Kumaravel's and Raaji's cousin
- Hema Rajkumar as Meenakshi Senthilnathan "Meena": (2023−present)
  - Senthil's wife, Shanthi and Tahsildar Ravi's daughter
- Akash Premkumar as Kathiravan Pandian "Kathir": (2023−present)
  - Pandian and Gomathi's youngest son; Kuzhali, Saravanan, Senthil's younger brother and Arasi's elder brother, Raaji's husband
  - Gandhimathi's grandson; Muthuvel, Sakthivel and Pazhanivel's nephew; Raji and Kumaravel's cousin
- Shalini Prabu as Rajeshwari Kathiravan "Raaji": (2023−present)
  - Kathir's wife; Muthuvel and Vadivu's daughter
  - Gandhimathi's granddaughter; Gomathi, Sakthivel and Pazhanivel's niece; Kuzhali, Saravanan, Senthil, Kathir, Arasi and Kumaravel's cousin
  - Kannan's ex-lover

=== Supporting ===
- Sathya Sai Krishnan (2023 -2026)/Sree Priya (2026−present) as Arasi Pandian:
  - Pandian and Gomathi's younger daughter; Kuzhali, Saravanan, Senthil and Kathir's younger sister
  - Gandhimathi's granddaughter; Muthuvel, Sakthivel and Pazhanivel's niece; Kumaravel's and Raaji's cousin.
- R Karuna Vilasini as Kuzhali Pandian: (2023−present)
  - Pandian and Gomathi's elder daughter; Saravanan, Senthil, Kathir and Arasi's elder sister; Anbu's wife
  - Gandhimathi's granddaughter; Muthuvel, Sakthivel and Pazhanivel's niece; Kumaravel's and Raaji's cousin
- Rajkumar Manoharan as Pazhanivel: (2023–present)
  - Gandhimathi's youngest son; Muthuvel, Sakthivel and Gomathi's youngest brother; Suganya's second husband
  - Kuzhali, Saravanan, Senthil, Kathir and Arasi's maternal uncle; Kumaravel and Raaji's paternal uncle
- Chandhini Prakash as Suganya Pazhanivel: (2023;2025−present)
  - Maari's cousin sister; a divorcee turned Pazhanivel's wife
- Sakthivel Adhi Meena as Kumaravel 'Kumar': (2023−present)
  - Kuzhali, Saravanan, Senthil, Kathir,and Arasi's cousin; Sakthivel and Maari's son; Raaji's cousin brother
  - Gandhimathi's grandson; Muthuvel, Gomathi and Pazhanivel's nephew; Arasi's fake husband; Sudar's husband
- Sofia as Muthu Sudar 'Sudar': Thangamayil's sister; Bakiyam and Manickam youngest daughter; Kumar's wife (2024−present)
- Sundar Annamalai as Anbu: Kuzhali's husband (2023−present)
- Srilekha Rajendran as Gandhimathi: (2023−present)
  - Muthuvel, Shakthivel, Pazhanivel and Gomathi's mother
  - Kuzhali, Saravanan, Senthil, Kathir, Arasi, Kumaravel and Raaji's grandmother
- Ajay Rathnam as Muthuvel: (2023−present)
  - Gandhimathi's eldest son; Sakthivel, Gomathi, and Pazhanivel's eldest brother; Vadivu's husband; Raaji's father; Kathir's father-in-law
  - Kumaravel's father's elder brother; Kuzhali, Saravanan, Senthil, Kathir and Arasi's uncle
- Gayathri Priya as Vadivu: (2023−present)
  - Muthuvel's wife and Raji's mother; Kathir's mother-in-law
  - Gandhimathi's daughter-in-law; Kuzhali, Saravanan, Senthil, Kathir, Arasi and Kumaravel's aunt
- Pondy Ravi as Sakthivel: (2023−present) (Main Antagonist)
  - Gandhimathi's second son; Muthuvel's younger brother, Gomathi and Pazhanivel's second elder brother; Maari's husband; Kumaravel's father
  - Kuzhali, Saravanan, Senthil, Kathir, Raji and Arasi's uncle
- Reehana.B (2023-2024) / Sai Madhavi (2024−present) as Maari
  - Sakthivel's wife and Kumaravel's mother
  - Suganya's cousin sister; Gandhimathi's daughter-in-law; Kuzhali, Saravanan, Senthil, Kathir, Raji and Arasi's aunt
- Sathiga/Yalini vinod as Anjali; Saravanan ex-lover (2026 present )
- Theni Murugan as Kumaresan - a faithful employee of Pandian Stores run by Pandian (2023−present)
- Saivam Ravi as Manickam: Bakiyam's husband; Thangamayil and Muthu Sudar's father (2024−present)
- Gowthami Vembunathan as Bakiyam: Manickam's wife; Thangamayil and Muthu Sudar's mother (2024−present)
- Ravi Chandran as Tahsildar Ravi: Shanthi's husband; Meena's father (2023−present)
- Sri Vidhya Shankar as Shanthi: Ravi's wife; Meena's mother (2023−present)
- Nethaji Suriya as Kannan: (2023−present)
  - Raji's ex-lover
- David Solomon Raja as Sivanesan; Umayal's husband; Sadeesh's father; Pandian's relative (2025−present)
- Sai Lakshmi as Umayal; Sivanesan's wife; Sadeesh's mother; Pandian's cousin sister (2025−present)
- Merwin Balaji as Satheesh: Sivanesan and Umayal's son; Arasi's ex-fiance (2025–present)
- Arjun as Karthikeyan; Arasi love interest (2026–present)
- Ravishankar as Karthikeyan's father (2026–present)
- Premalatha as Karthikeyan's mother (2026-Present)

=== Special appearance ===
- Dasarathy as the host of a matchmaking event to find a wife for Saravanan (2024)

== Production ==
=== Casting ===
With the release of first promo, Stalin Muthu was confirmed to be acting in the show, under a new role of Pandi. Actress Nirosha was cast as Pandians's wife, marking her return after Vaidhegi Kaathirundhaal. VJ Kathirvel Kandasamy, Vasanth Vasi and Akash Premkumar were confirmed as male lead roles, playing the roles of Pandian's sons.

Kadhanayagi fame Shalini and Vilashini were confirmed as female lead roles. Actor Ajay Rathnam was cast as important role. Hema Raj Sathish confirmed herself that she will act in Pandian Stores 2, reprising her role as Meena under a different story. Gayathri Priya was cast as Vadivu. Sharanya Turadi was cast as Thangamayil In end of July 2024, Vasanth Vasi was replaced by Venkat Renganathan.

=== Release ===
The first promo was released on 14 October 2023 featuring the lead characters. The second promo was unveiled on 16 October 2023, The third Launch promo was unveiled on 20 October 2023 and revealing the release date.

== Awards and honours ==
Year	Award	Category	Recipient(s)	Result
2024	9th Annual Vijay Television Awards	Favourite Family	Pandian Stores 2	Won
2024	9th Annual Vijay Television Awards	Best Writer	Priya Thampi	Won
2024	9th Annual Vijay Television Awards	Best Appa	Stalin Muthu	Won
2024	9th Annual Vijay Television Awards	Best Amma	Nirosha	Won
2024	9th Annual Vijay Television Awards	Favourite Pair On Screen	Akash & Shalini	Nominated
2024	9th Annual Vijay Television Awards	Favourite Pair On Screen	Sharanya & VJ Kathirvel	Nominated
2025	10th Annual Vijay Television Awards	Favourite Family	Pandian Stores 2	Won
2025	10th Annual Vijay Television Awards	Best Writer	Priya Thampy	Won
2025	10th Annual Vijay Television Awards	Budding Young Pair	Akash & Shalini	Won
2025	10th Annual Vijay Television Awards	Best Father	Stalin Muthu	Won
2025	10th Annual Vijay Television Awards	Best Mother	Nirosha	Won
2025	10th Annual Vijay Television Awards	Best Dialogue Writer	Girish Thampy	Won
2025	10th Annual Vijay Television Awards	Best Character Female	Sharanya Turadi Sundarraj	Won
2025	10th Annual Vijay Television Awards	Best Heroine	Shalini	Nominated
2025	10th Annual Vijay Television Awards	Best Heroine	Hema Rajkumar	Nominated
2025	10th Annual Vijay Television Awards	Best Heroine	Sharanya Turadi Sundarraj	Nominated
2025	10th Annual Vijay Television Awards	Best Hero	Akash Premkumar	Nominated
2025	10th Annual Vijay Television Awards	Best Hero	Venkat Renganathan	Nominated
2025	10th Annual Vijay Television Awards	Best Hero	VJ Kathirvel	Nominated
2026	Indian Awards 2026	Luminary Star of the Year	Shalini	Won
2026	Indian Awards 2026	Legendary Achievement to Television Industry	Nirosha	Won
2026	Indian Awards 2026	Favourite Actress of the Year	Sharanya Turadi Sundarraj	Won

== Adaptations ==
Language	Title	Original release	Network(s)	Last aired	Notes
Tamil	Pandian Stores 2 பாண்டியன் ஸ்டோர்ஸ் 2	30 October 2023	Star Vijay	Ongoing	Original
Malayalam	Santhwanam 2 സാന്ത്വനം 2	17 June 2024	Asianet	Ongoing	Remake
Telugu	Illu Illalu Pillalu ఇల్లు ఇల్లాలు పిల్లలు	12 November 2024	Star Maa	Ongoing	Remake
Kannada	Nanda Gokula ನಂದ ಗೋಕುಲ	4 June 2025	Colors Kannada	Ongoing	Remake
Hindi	Mahadev & Sons महादेव & Sons	5 January 2026	Colors TV	Ongoing	Remake
Marathi	Suna Yeti Ghara सुना येती घरा	15 June 2026	Star Pravah	Ongoing	Remake
