= Nenjam Marappathillai (TV series) =

Tamil language television series

- Genre: Soap opera Family drama
- Screenplay by: Rasool
- Story by: Rasool
- Directed by: Abdul Hafees
- Starring: Sharanya; Amit Bhargav; Nisha Krishnan; Sowmya Rao Nadig; Ashwanth Thilak; Anuradha
- Theme music composer: Ilayavan
- Country of origin: India
- Original language: Tamil
- No. of episodes: 358

Production
- Editor: S.Mathan kumar
- Camera setup: Multi-camera
- Running time: 22 minutes
- Production company: Kala Communication

Original release
- Network: Star Vijay
- Release: 9 October 2017 – 22 February 2019

Related
- Kusum Dola; Ghum Hai Kisikey Pyaar Meiin

Nenjam Marappathillai (transl. The Heart Never Forgets) is a 2017 Tamil language soap opera starring Sharanya Turadi and Amit Bhargav. Its main plot was taken from the Bengali language television series Kusum Dola, with a different story and screenplay by Rasool.

It aired beginning on 9 October 2017 on Star Vijay and replaced the series Mappillai. This serial is a love story about Saranya (Sharanya Turadi) and Vikram (Amit Bhargav) whose lives were changed after certain incident. The series ended on 22 February 2019 when Amit Bhargav left the serial. It was replaced with the serial Bharathi Kannamma.

== Plot ==
Saranya, the small town, good-hearted daughter of a police officer lives in Kodaikanal. She is a new MBBS graduate and is planning to do post-graduation in Surgery in Chennai. She is loved by everyone in her town.

Vikram is an aspiring IPS officer from a joint family where people have different thoughts. On a trip Vikram meets Sathya and both develop feelings for each other but they can not express their feelings. Vikram gets posted to Kodaikanal, but accidentally he loses his phone and cannot contact Sathya, making her feel cheated. Soon, she gets engaged to Vikram's brother, Arjun. Vikram, despite knowing this, refuses to break their marriage and gave promise that he never love any women. After the marriage, Arjun learns of their story and leaves the house, without telling the truth to anyone.

Due to circumstances, Saranya loses her father in a botched police operation to catch a thug, who wanted to forcefully wed Saranya. Saranya feels that IPS officer Vikram is one of the reasons for her father's death, as Vikram inadvertently brought him to the field. Orphan Saranya tries to commit suicide after that. Her villagers force Vikram to marry her and take responsibility in fulfilling her future, so Saranya marries him. But they don't accept each other as husband and wife. On confronting them, Sathya feels cheated and betrayed by Vikram.

The story revolves around Saranya's life in Vikram's joint family, with varied members. They start loving each other. Then they get married again. Later Vikram's enemies try to get Saranya aborted, but she escapes from all the problems. Then there is a seemantham for Saranaya. At last, the season ends.

== Cast ==
=== Main ===
- Sharanya Turadi as Dr. Saranya Vikram: Velraj's daughter; Vikram's wife.
- Amit Bhargav as ACP Vikram Sivakumar: Sivakumar and Jaya's elder son; Arjun's brother; Priya, Arun and Dileepan's cousin; Sathya's ex-lover; Saranya's husband.
- Nisha Krishnan / Sowmya Rao Nadig as Sathya Arjun: Vikram's ex-lover; Arjun's wife.
- Ashwanth Thilak as Arjun Sivakumar: Sivakumar and Jaya's younger son; Vikram's brother; Priya, Arun and Dileepan's cousin; Sathya's husband.

=== Recurring ===
- Anuradha as Akhilandeshwari: Priya's mother; Vikram, Arjun, Arun and Dileepan's aunt
- Afsar Babu as Sivakumar: Sridevi and Bhagyalaxmi's brother; Jaya's husband; Vikram and Arjun's father
- J. Lalitha as Jaya Sivakumar: Sivakumar's wife; Vikram and Arjun's mother
- Asha Rani as Bhagyalaxmi Balachandran: Sridevi and Sivakumar's sister; Balachandran's wife; Arun's mother
- Murali Kumar as Dr. Balachandran: Bhagyalaxmi's husband; Arun's father; Saranya's Medical College Dean
- Dharini as Sridevi: Sivakumar and Bhagyalaxmi's sister
- Sri Durga as Priya Meenakshi: Akhilandeshwari's daughter; Vikram, Arjun, Arun and Dileepan's cousin; Meenakshi's wife
- Dev Anand as Meenakshi Sundaram: Priya's husband
- KL Mani as Arun Balachandran: Bhagyalaxmi and Balachandran's son; Vikram, Arjun, Priya and Dileepan's cousin
- Praveen/Aravish as Dileepan: Vikram, Arjun, Priya and Arun's cousin; Pavithra's husband
- Preethi Kumar as Pavithra Dileepan, Dileepan's wife
- Sumathi Sri as Bhanumathy: Saranya's foster mother
- Franklin as Dileepan's father
- Kumaresan as Sathya's father
- Babitha as Sathya's mother

=== Former ===
- Nisha Ganesh as Sathya (episodes 1–120), replaced by Sowmya Rao Nadig on further episodes
- L. Raja as Inspector Raja Velraj, Saranya's father
- Shyam as Santhosh, Saranya's classmate and friend
- Feroz Khan as Engine Bhaskar, a local goon and terrorist, obsessed with Saranya and with a grudge on Vikram
- Nesan as Mahesh (Thalaivar), a cruel politician and Bhaskar's brother
- Fauzil Hidayah as Madhavi, Mahesh and Bhaskar's sister, who was in love with Vikram
- Meenakshi as Pavun Mahesh, Thalaivar's wife
- "Murattu Pandian" Baboos as Auto Arnold

=== Special appearances ===
- KPY Ramar as himself
- Abhinayashree as herself
- Radhika Rao as Dhivya, to promote her new show Ponnukku Thanga Manasu

== Production ==
=== Casting ===
Amit Bhargav was chosen due to his amazing performance in Kalyanam Mudhal Kadhal Varai. Priya Bhavani Shankar was chosen to play one of the female leads but she declined. News Anchor Sharanya Turadi Sundaraj later chosen, is making their debut with the series. Nisha Krishnan was chosen as well after her great performances in many shows on Vijay TV.later that role acted by Sowmya Rao Nadig Later Sowmya was replaced role of Sathya in Episode: 122, formerly featured in the series Valli. Anuradha was cast to portray the negative role of Akhilandeshwari. Other supporting cast include Ashwanth Thilak, Sri Durga and J. Lalitha.

=== Development ===
On 27 August 2017, the first promo of the show one minute 'Song' was released by Vijay TV on YouTube. On 21 May 2017, the second, On 3 September 2017 promo of the show was released by Vijay TV.

== Awards and nominations ==
Year	Award	Category	Recipient	Role	Result
2018	Galatta Nakshathra Awards	Best Actor	Amit Bhargav	Vikram	Nominated
2018	Galatta Nakshathra Awards	Best Pair	Amit Bhargav & Sharanya Turadi Sundaraj	Vikram & Saranya	Nominated
2018	4th Vijay Television Awards	Favourite Actor Female	Sharanya Turadi Sundaraj	Saranya	Nominated
2018	4th Vijay Television Awards	Favourite Actor Male	Amit Bhargav	Vikram	Nominated
2018	4th Vijay Television Awards	Favourite Screen Pair	Amit Bhargav & Sharanya Turadi Sundaraj	Vikram & Saranya	Nominated
2018	4th Vijay Television Awards	Favourite Supporting Actor Female	Asha Rani		Nominated
2018	4th Vijay Television Awards	Favourite Supporting Actor Male	Murali Kumar		Nominated
2018	4th Vijay Television Awards	Best Dop	R.S Saravanan		Nominated
2018	4th Vijay Television Awards	Favourite Fiction Series	Nenjam Marappathillai		Nominated
2018	4th Vijay Television Awards	Best Crew Fiction	Raja Rani		Nominated
2018	4th Vijay Television Awards	Favourite Find	Sharanya Turadi Sundaraj	Saranya	Won
2018	4th Vijay Television Awards	Best Father	Raja	R. Velraj	Nominated
2018	4th Vijay Television Awards	Favourite Negative Role	Anuradha	Akhilandeshwari	Nominated
2018	4th Vijay Television Awards	Favourite Mother	Sumathi Sri		Nominated
2018	4th Vijay Television Awards	Favourite Mamiyar	J. Lalitha	Jaya	Nominated
2018	4th Vijay Television Awards	Best Director			Nominated
