= Nisha Ganesh =

Indian actress

- Born: Nisha Krishnan; Chennai, Tamil Nadu, India
- Occupation: Actress
- Years active: 2013–2018; 2020–present
- Spouse: Ganesh Venkatraman (m. 2015)
- Children: 2

Nisha Ganesh is an Indian film and television actress who has appeared in Tamil films and serials. After making her breakthrough portraying Draupadi in the TV series Mahabharatham and hosting shows such as Surya Vanakkam on Sun TV, she has gone on to appear in supporting roles in feature films.

== Career ==
Nisha started her acting as a college student in Vijay TV's Kana Kannum Kalangal Kalloriyin Kadhai and later appeared in Saravanan Meenatchi as Thenmozhi. Nisha Krishnan made her breakthrough portraying Draupadi in the TV series Mahabharatham and subsequently went on to host shows such as Surya Vanakkam, Kitchen Galatta and Sun Singer (Season- 2) and appeared in the TV series Deivamagal as Ragini on Sun TV.

As a media student, she was actively involved in short film-making during her education and collaborated with them when making the films Bench Talkies - The First Bench (2015) and Chennai Ungalai Anbudan Varaverkirathu (2015). She has also gone on to appear in supporting roles in feature films, notably portraying roles in Ivan Veramathiri (2013) and Naan Sigappu Manithan (2014).

== Personal life ==
Nisha Krishnan got engaged to actor Ganesh Venkatraman in February 2015, and the pair got married on 22 November 2015. In June 2019 she gave birth to their first child Samaira. On 3 October 2023, the couple had their second child, a boy named Amar.

== Filmography ==
Year	Film	Role	Language
2013	Ivan Veramathiri	Gunasekharan's friend	Tamil
2014	Naan Sigappu Manithan	Meera's friend	Tamil
2014	Enna Satham Indha Neram	Journalist	Tamil
2015	Bench Talkies - The First Bench	Zara	Tamil
2015	Chennai Ungalai Anbudan Varaverkirathu		Tamil
2016	Vil Ambu	Kavya	Tamil
TBA	Krishnudiki Vaarasudu †		Telugu

== Television ==
Serials

Year	Title	Role	Channel	Language
2011–2013	Kana Kanum Kalangal Kallooriyin Kadhai	Divya	Star Vijay	Tamil
2013–2014	Office	Nisha	Star Vijay	Tamil
2013–2014	Saravanan Meenatchi	Thenmozhi	Star Vijay	Tamil
2013–2014	Deivamagal	Ragini	Sun TV	Tamil
2013–2016	Mahabharatham	Draupadi	Sun TV	Tamil
2016–2017	Thalayanai Pookal	Vedavalli Nagaraj	Zee Tamizh	Tamil
2017–2018	Nenjam Marappathillai	Sathya	Star Vijay	Tamil
2020	Thirumagal	Herself (Special Appearance)	Sun TV	Tamil
2021	Sreemantudu	Sathya	ETV	Telugu
2022	Abhi Tailor	Herself (Special Appearance)	Colors Tamil	Tamil
2022	Sembaruthi	Adv. Geetha Subramaniam (Special Appearance)	Zee Tamil	Tamil
2023	Kolangal-2	Mohini	ETV	Telugu
2025	Mounam Pesiyadhe	Lawer Anbukkarasi	Zee Tamil	Tamil

Shows

Year	Title	Channel	Language
2013	Sun Singer	Sun TV	Tamil
2013–2015	Surya Vanakkam	Sun TV	Tamil
2014–2015	Vendhar Veetu Kalyanam	Vendhar TV	Tamil
2015	Kitchen Galatta	Sun TV	Tamil
2018	Star Singer	Jaya TV	Tamil
2021	Vanakkam Tamizha	Sun TV	Tamil
2021	Rowdy Baby	Sun TV	Tamil
2022	Namma Veettu Kalyanam	Vijay Music	Tamil
