= Run (Indian TV series) =

Indian television series (2019–2020)

- Genre: Thriller; Romance
- Screenplay by: C.U Muthuselvan
- Directed by: Selvaa (Episode 1–50); K. Rajeev Prasad (Episode 51–197)
- Starring: Krishna Raghunandan; Sharanya Turadi Sundarraj; Chaya Singh
- Theme music composer: Vikram Selva
- Composer: Kiran
- Country of origin: India
- Original language: Tamil
- No. of seasons: 1
- No. of episodes: 197

Production
- Production locations: Chennai, Bangkok, Hong Kong, London
- Cinematography: B.Balamurugan
- Camera setup: Multi camera
- Running time: 20-22 minutes
- Production companies: Vikatan Televistas; Motion Content Group

Original release
- Network: Sun TV
- Release: 5 August 2019 – 31 March 2020

Run is a 2019–20 Tamil-language thriller drama series directed by K. Rajeev Prasad is a remake of Turkish Serial “Black Money love” on Sun TV. It stars Krishna Raghunandan and Sharanya Turadi Sundarraj (later replaced by Chaya Singh). It premiered on 5 August 2019 and ended on 31 March 2020 for 197 episodes due to the coronavirus pandemic.

== Synopsis ==
Run is a thriller drama on Sun TV. The story is about Shakthi (Krishna Raghunandan), faces enemies in his life.

Divya (Sharanya Turadi / Chaya Singh) returns from her abroad education and takes up the rein of her father's nursing home. She adores her father and is devastated to find him in a financial crisis. Shakthi (Krishna Raghunandan), an employee of an automobile company lives with his sister's family, who mean the world to him. He is engaged to Caroline (Navya Swamy), the love of his life. Unfortunately, Divya's father (Nizhalagal Ravi) and Sakthi (Krishna Raghunandan)'s fiancée go missing on the same day and later found dead. Watch how Divya (Sharanya Turadi / Chaya Singh)and Shakthi (Krishna Raghunandan)'s common motive and probe to unravel the mysterious deaths, bring their hearts closer. Divya (Sharanya Turadi / Chaya Singh), a hard-working and smart woman from a rich family, realises that her father is facing problems. A series of events leads her to Shakthi (Krishna Raghunandan), who is straightforward and despises affluent people.

== Cast ==
=== Main ===
- Krishna Raghunandan as Shakthivel
- Sharanya Turadi Sundarraj (2019) as Divya
  - Chaya Singh (2019-2020) as Divya Shaktivel
- Vijjith as Rudramoorthy "Rudran" (Selvanayagam's henchman)(Main Antagonist)

=== Supporting ===
- Nizhalgal Ravi as Dr. Radhakrishnan "RK": Father of Shalini, Divya and Ramya.
- Pramodini Pammi as Gayathri Radhakrishnan: Mother of Shalini, Divya and Ramya
- Ashwanth Thilak as Prabhu, Shakthi's Best Friend
- Rindhya as Shalini Sekhar: Elder sister of Divya and Ramya
- Mythili Raju → Vaishnavi as Ramya Rudramoorthy: Younger sister of Shalini and Divya
- Shyam Sundar as Chandrasekhar "Sekhar": Shalini's Husband
- Sindhu Shyam as Meenakumari (Antagonist)
- Ashwin Karthik as Vikraman "Vikram" Senthilkumar: Meenakumari's brother-in-law (Antagonist)
- Raj Kapoor as Selvanayagam: Gayathri's brother-in-law and Meenakumari's henchman
- Sathyapriya as RK's aunt and Divya's grandmother
- Sri Durga as Lokeshwari Chandran aka Logu: Shakthi's elder sister
- Srikrishna Kaushik as Chandran: Shakthi's brother in law
- Navya Swamy as Caroline: Shakthi's lover (Deceased, killed by Vikram)
- Kurinji Nathan as Christopher: Caroline's elder brother
- Durga Deepthi as Nancy Christopher: Christopher's wife
- Babitha as Caroline's mother
- Mithuna as Jessy: Caroline's younger sister
- Vijayachandrika as Meenakumari's mother
- Reena as Chandran's mother
- VJ Sasikala Nagarajan as Priya: Divya's colleague
- Rafi Ullah as Siju: Rudran's assistant
- Tharsika as Rohini: Shakthi and Prabhu's friend
- Vishwanathan as Prabhu's fake brother
- Archana VJ as Prabhu's fake sister
- K. S. G. Venkatesh as Shakthi's Car company owner
- Yaar Kannan

== Production ==
This Tamil drama is produced with a cinematic tone, making it different from other usual Tamil dramas. Some of the initial scenes were shot in Hong Kong. Besides some were also shot in Chennai, Alleppey and some parts of North India.

Initially, Vani Bhojan was chosen to play female leads but she declined. Later, Sharanyaa Turadi Sundar Raj played Divya. In November 2019, Sundar Raj quit and was replaced by Chaya Singh.

== Dubbed version ==
This series is dubbed into Telugu as Run in ETV Telugu and started telecast from 5 April 2021.
