= Mahabharatham (TV series) =

- Genre: Mythological drama
- Based on: Mahabharata
- Screenplay by: Abiram; Kannan
- Directed by: C.V. Sasikumar; Suresh Krissna A. Selvaraj
- Starring: Poovilangu Mohan; Saakshi Siva; Amit Bhargav; Neelima Rani; Ilavarasan
- Theme music composer: Deva
- Opening theme: "Mahabharatham"; Shankar Mahadevan (Vocal); Pa. Vijay (Lyrics)
- Country of origin: India
- Original language: Tamil
- No. of seasons: 1
- No. of episodes: 166

Production
- Executive producer: Sunil Mehta
- Producers: Sunil Mehta; Prem Khirushen
- Editor: S.Richard
- Camera setup: Multi-camera
- Running time: approx. 40-45 minutes per episode
- Production companies: Cinevistaas Limited; Vision Time India Private Limited

Original release
- Network: Sun TV (India) re-telecast Colors Tamil
- Release: 17 February 2013 – 29 May 2016

Mahabharatham (Tamil: மகாபாரதம்) is an Indian Tamil-language mythological television series that aired every Sunday on Sun TV from 17 February 2013 to 29 May 2016 at 10:00 AM IST. The 166-episode show is based on Mahabharat, told by sage and seer Veda Vyasa Maharshi and supposed to be written by Lord Vinayaka Bhagavan on sage Vyasa's instruction for the bounty of human race thousands of years ago.

The show starred Poovilangu Mohan, Saakshi Siva, Amit Bhargav, Neelima Rani, Ilavarasan, Nisha Krishnan and among others. It was produced by Cinevistaas Limited and director by C.V. Sasikumar, Raja and Suresh Krissna. The epic television series has more than 400 artists cast in various roles. Mahabharatham is currently retelecasting in Colors Tamil from 19 February 2023 Sunday 10:00AM.

== Cast ==
- Amit Bhargav / Vallab as Lord Krishna / Lord Vishnu
- Neelima Rani as Rukmini / Goddess Padmavati
- Ramya Ramakrishnan as Goddess Mahalakshmi
- Swarupu as Indra
- Poovilangu Mohan as Vyasa
- Bharat Kalyan as Vasudeva
- Pavitra Lokesh as Devaki
- Pasanga Sivakumar as Nanda Baba
- Durga / Yuva Sri as Yashoda
- Ilavarasan as Shantanu
- Rashmi as Ganga
- O.A.K. Sundar as Bhishma
- Devipriya as Satyavati
- Pooja Lokesh as Amba / Shikandi
- Archana Gaikwad as Ambika
- Roopika as Ambalika
- Narasimha Raju as Dhritarashtra
- Pavithra Janani as Gandhari
- Bose Venkat as Pandu
- Dipika Gunasegar as Kunti
- Saakshi Siva as Vidura
- Bharathkumar as Parashurama
- Vetri Vel as Duryodhan
- Manohar as Karna/Janamejaya
- Ravi Bhat as Yudhishthira
- Sathya as Arjuna
- Aishwarya Prabhakar / Nisha Ganesh as Draupadi/Panchali
- Ramesh Pandit as Shakuni
- Gururaj as Vashistha
- Shamily Sukumar as Subhadra
- Bhavya Kala as Sulabha
- Sharanya Turadi Sundarraj as Paali
- Kavitha Gowda as Shubhangi
- Sajan Prasad as teen Krishna
- Minnal Deepa as Rohini Devi

== Episodes ==
Episode No.	Plot
001	Veda Vyasa dictates the Mahabharatha to Lord Ganesha. Janamejaya performs the Sarpa Satra yajna. Vyasa and Asthika make him stop. Vyasa starts to relate the Mahabharatha to Janamejaya.
002	Shanthanu is king of Hasthinapura. He meets and marries the river nymph Ganga. Ganga starts killing their sons but is stopped from killing the eighth. Shanthanu and Devavrata meet each other after several years of being apart.
003	Devavrata is made crown prince after passing a test. Shanthanu meets Matsyavathi and asks her father for her hand in marriage. Devavrata meets Dasharaj and brings Matsyavathi home after taking a terrible vow.
004	Devavrata publicly renounces the crown. Shanthanu and Matsyavathi marry and have two children. Shanthanu passes away. Matsyavathi becomes ruler. Chitrangadha is a teenager. He fights and is killed by a Gandharva. Satyavathi asks Bheeshma to abduct the princesses of Kashi.
005	Bheeshma meets Vyasa and asks him for advice. Bheeshma abducts the princesses of Kashi after fighting Shalvakumar. Amba refuses to go with Bheeshma and goes to Shalvakumar and is rejected. Ambika and Ambalika agree to marry Vichitraveerya. Amba goes to Kashi but her father turns her out.
006	Vichitraveerya marries Ambika and Ambalika. Amba meets Bheeshma at Hasthinapura and asks him to marry her. He refuses and Amba is thrown out. Amba then goes to other kingdoms for help but is rejected. Vichitraveerya is treated for his sickness.
007	Amba goes to Parashurama for help. Parashurama asks Bheeshma to either accept Amba as his wife or fight with him. Parashurama and Bheeshma fight with each other with neither winning. Vichitraveerya dies in bed while trying to consummate with Ambika.
008	Satyavathi asks Bheeshma to practice Niyoga with Ambika and Ambalika, but he refuses. Satyavathi tells Bheeshma about Vyasa being her son and how he had accepted her request for Niyoga. Ambika and Ambalika are informed about the Niyoga to be performed by Vyasa. Amba goes to the Himalayas to pray to Lord Shiva.
009	Vyasa performs Niyoga with Ambika and Ambalika and Ambika's maid. Dhirithrastra and Pandu are born. Amba is performing penance to please Lord Shiva. Vyasa shows Bheeshma a glimpse of the future. Satyavathi asks Vyasa the truth about the third Niyoga.
010	Bheeshma tests Dhirithrastra, Pandu and Vidura. Vyasa discourses on birth and death in the court. Amba's penance is fruitful. Lord Shiva tells her that she will be the cause of Bheeshma's death, but not in her present life. Amba commits suicide in a bonfire.
011	Eighteen years pass. Dhirithrastra, Pandu and Vidura are grown men and have completed their studies. Bheeshma and Satyavathi fix brides for Dhirithrastra and Pandu with the help of astrologers. Gandhari is chosen for Dhirithrastra and Kunti for Pandu. Vyasa warns Janamejaya about Shakuni.
012	Vidura chooses Sulabha for his bride with the blessings of Bheeshma and Satyavathi. Bheeshma sends messengers to Gandhara and Kunti kingdoms asking for their princesses' hands in marriage to Dhirithrastra and Pandu respectively. Shakuni is against Gandhari's marriage to Dhirithrastra. Kunti remembers the birth of Karna.
013	Vyasa warns Kuntibhoja of Dhurvasa's coming. Dhurvasa asks for Kunti's help in performing his yajna. At the end of a year he teaches her a mantra to beget sons from celestial beings. Kunti uses it to invoke Surya. Karna is born. Kunti puts Karna in a basket and floats him down the river.
014	Dhirithrastra and Pandu marry Gandhari and Kunti. Gandhari ties a blindfold over her eyes to share in the blindness of her husband. Bheeshma goes to Madra and asks for Madri's hand in marriage to Pandu. Pandu and Madri get married. Dhirithrastra is awaiting his coronation
015	Bheeshma, Vidura and Satyavathi meet Rishi Yuvabhoda to find out if there is any chance for Dhirithrastra to rule the kingdom. Yuvobhoda says there is no chance for this as Dhirithrastra is blind. Dhirithrastra throws a fit when he finds out Pandu is to be crowned king. Shakuni comes up with a scheme through which Dhirithrastra can rule in the name of Pandu.
016	Pandu is crowned king and sets off on a conquest of the known lands. Adhiratha and Radha's adopted son Radheya saves Kunti's life when her chariot becomes uncontrollable. Kamsa gives the people of Mathura a hard time. Lord Vishnu tells His consorts that it is time for His next avatar on Earth.
017	Devaki and Vasudeva are married. Kamsa is warned by a celestial voice that Devaki's eighth son will kill him. Vasudeva promises to bring the children to Kamsa as and when they are born. Kamsa lets Devaki's first son live. Narada visits Mathura and asks Kamsa how he would identify which child is the first and which the eighth.
018	Dhrumila asura tells Kamsa that Kamsa is an asura and that Devaki's eighth son is destined to kill him. Pandu returns victorious after his conquests. Satyavathi gives Vidura's mother equal status to Ambika and Ambalika. Lord Vishnu reveals the secret behind the impending deaths of Devaki's first seven issues. Shakuni schemes to oust Pandu and put Dhirithrastra on the throne. Kamsa plans to imprison Devaki and Vasudeva.
019	Kamsa imprisons Devaki and Vasudeva. Vyasa visits Hasthinapur and tells Gandhari that she will have 101 children. Ugrasena confronts Kamsa and Kamsa imprisons Ugrasena also. Shakuni implants the idea of going to the forest in Pandu's mind, so that Dhirithrastra can rule the kingdom.
020	Devaki and Vasudeva decide not to have any more children but Yoga Maya appears before them and tells them to continue begetting offspring so that the eight child can end Kamsa's evil rule. Pandu goes to the forest with Kunti and Madri after obtaining permission from Satyavathi, Bheeshma and Dhirithrastra. Kamsa kills Devaki's second issue. Pandu goes hunting in the forest.
021	Pandu kills Rishi Kindama and his wife when they are making love and Rishi Kindama curses Pandu. Gandhari is pregnant. Bheeshma wants to consult with Rishi Yuvabhoda and see if Pandu's curse can be lifted. Kunti tells Pandu about the mantra that Rishi Dhurvasa taught her. Pandu and Kunti use the mantra to summon Yama, the god of righteousness and dharma. Kunti is impregnated with her first son.
022	Yudhishtra is born as the first of the descendants of Dhirithrastra and Pandu. Gandhari hits the baby growing in her stomach. Vyasa asks for 101 vessels filled with ghee and the Kauravas are born. Bheema is born with the grace of Lord Vayu. Rohini gives birth to Balarama. Astrologers predict the destruction of the kshatriya race if the first-born of Dhirithrastra is left alive but Dhirithrastra refuses to sacrifice the baby. Vyasa names Dhirithrastra's children, including Yuyutsu (born of a maid). Krishna is born.
023	Vasudeva takes Krishna to Nanda and Yashoda at Gokul and brings back their daughter. Kamsa tries to kill the girl child but she turns into Yoga Maya and tells Kamsa his end is near. Arjuna is born with the grace of Lord Indra. Kamsa sends Bhootna to kill Krishna but she herself dies in the process. Madri gives birth to Nakula and Sahadeva with the grace of the Ashwini twins. Krishna gets rid of Kaliya. Pandu dies.
024	Madri ascends the funeral pyre of Pandu. Indra is angered when Krishna asks the people of Gokul not to worship him. Krishna lifts the Govardhan with his little finger. The Pandavas reach Hasthinapura. Shakuni and Duryodhana scheme to get the Pandavas out of Hasthinapur. Satyavathi decides to move to the forest, giving up a life of royalty.
025	Kamsa sends Akrura to Gokul to fetch Krishna. Ambika and Ambalika decide to join Satyavathi in vanaprastha. Krishna and Balarama go with Akrura to Mathura. Satyavathi, Ambika and Ambalika leave for the forest. Krishna and Balarama defeat Chanura and Mushtika. Krishna kills Kamsa and installs Ugrasena on the throne.
026	The princes are grown men. Drona arranges for them to display their skills. Bheema and Duryodhana fight each other with maces till Ashwathamma stops them on Drona's orders. Arjuna exhibits the use of various celestial astras. Karna challenges Arjuna. Kripacharya asks Karna about his lineage.
027	Kunti identifies Karna as her son and faints. Duryodhana makes Karna king of Anga. Adhiratha shows up at the arena and Bheema insults Karna. Bheeshma asks Drona what he wants as guru dakshina. Drona asks for Draupada's enslavement. Duryodhana gets ready to face Draupada in battle.
028	Duryodhana loses in battle against Draupada. Arjuna then goes to Panchala, wins the battle against Darupada and brings him in chains before Drona. Drona takes half of Panchala and makes Ashwathamma the king of that portion. Drona presents Arjuna with a bow for fulfilling his wish. Vidura asks Dhirithrastra to announce who would be the crown prince.
029	While Vidhura puts forward Yudhishtra's name for the position of crown prince, Karna, Dushasana and Shakuni support Duryodhana's installation in the post. Dhirithrastra postpones making the decision. Shakuni hatches a plan to get rid of the Pandavas.
030	Shakuni asks Dhirithrastra to meet a Brahmin named Kanika. Arjuna meets Ekalavya. Dhirithrastra and Kanika meet and talk. Drona asks Ekalavya to cut off and give the thumb of his right hand as guru dakshina. Shakuni and Duryodhana ask Dhirithrastra for permission to kill the Pandavas.
031	Shakuni, Duryodhana and Dushasana meet Purochana. Shakuni meets Dhirithrastra and asks him to send the Pandavas to Varanavata. Dhirithrastra instates Yudhishtra as crown prince. Purochana invites Dhirithrastra to Varanavata but Dhirithrastra asks Yudhishtra and the Pandavas to go to Varanavata in his stead. Vidura meets Kanaka and asks him to save the Pandavas.
032	The Pandavas and Kunti leave for Varanavata. Vidura gives them a warning, veiled as advice. Draupada meets Rishi Yuvabhoda and ask for help in killing Drona. Yuvabhoda tells him to seek out Yaja and Upayaja. Dhirithrastra meets Shakuni, Duryodhana and Dushasana and asks them for the reason behind sending the Pandavas to Varanavata.
033	Ashwathamma asks Drona to teach him to use the Brahmasthra but is refused. The Pandavas arrive at Varanavata and Purochana introduces them to Vanjikodi and her sons Udhayan, Thuyan, Mayilan and Sadayan. Drupada goes in search of Yaja and Upayaja. Ashwathamma tells Kripi that Drona has already taught Arjuna how to use the Brahmastra. Drupada finds Yaja and Upayaja but his offer is turned down. The Pandavas find out the palace is made of inflammable materials.
034	Draupada waits on Yaja and Upayaja. Kanaka meets the Pandavas and informs them of Vidura's plan to escape the house of lac. Upayaja tells Drupada that his brother would be willing to help for the correct price. Ashwathamma and Kripi meet Ekalavya.
035	Ashwathamma forces Drona to teach him to use the Brahmastra. Yaja and Upayaja agree to help Draupada. Shakuni fixes the date for setting the lac palace on fire. Darupada asks his brother Satyajit to make preparations for the yajna. Vidura instructs Kanaka to set the palace on fire one day before the date fixed by Shakuni and to inform the Pandavas to escape through the tunnel.
036	Kunti sends Vanjikodi and her sons away with gifts but they come back to the palace through a back entrance. Kanaka informs the Pandavas about the plan to set fire to the lac palace. The Pandavas convince Purochana that they are drunk and he goes ahead with the plan to set fire to the palace. Draupada informs the rishis that his wife does not support his venture. They decide to perform the Raudragini yajna. Bheema kills Vanjikodi and her five sons. Kanaka imprisons Purochana in his own room. Bheema sets fire to the palace and the Pandavas escape through the tunnel. A citizen of Varanavata informs Dhirithrastra, Gandhari and Vidura that the Pandavas are no more
037	Yaja and Upayaja start the Raudragini yajna. Duryodhana, Shakuni and Dushasana are informed that the Pandavas and Kunti are no more. Kanaka helps the Pandavas go to the other side of the river. Bheeshma sends a messenger requesting Vyasa to perform the last rites of the Pandavas, but Vyasa is in deep meditation. Vidura suggests that Krishna be informed of the situation. Asthi and Prapti ask their father Jarasandha to avenge Kamsa's death.
038	Dhrumila asura meets Jarasandha. Krishna goes in search of Rishi Sandipani's son. Krishna takes the rishi's son with him from Yama's abode. The Pandavas wander the forests. Dhirithrastra accuses Shakuni of killing the Pandavas. Krishna returns Rishi Sandipani's son to him and his wife.
039	Dhristadyumna and Draupadi are born, followed by a celestial occurrence seen by all. News of the Pandavas' death reaches Kampilya. Jarasandha goes in search of Krishna. Krishna and Balarama return to Mathura. Hidimbi falls in love with Bheema.
040	Jarasandha battles Balarama and Krishna. Hidimbi follows Bheema around. Balarama and Krishna run away from the battlefield. Bheema and Hidimba fight and Hidimba is killed. A messenger from Hasthinapura informs Krishna and Balarama of the Pandavas' death. The Pandavas put Kunti in a shack and go in search of food and come back to find a clean hut filled with food.
041	Hidimbi tells the Pandavas and Kunti that Vyasa will meet them soon. Vyasa asks Bheema to marry Hidimbi. Krishna arrives in Hasthinapura and performs the last rites of the Pandavas. Hidimbi and Bheema are together. Draupada takes Dhristadyumna and Draupadi to meet Rishi Yaja.
042	Vidura tells Bheeshma the Pandavas are alive. Jarasandha promises his daughters that he will avenge Kamsa's death. Gatotkacha is born. The Pandavas move out of Kamyaka forest. Vishwakarma is asked to create Dwarakapuri. Vaishampayana asks the Pandavas to go to Ekachakrapura.
043	Dwaraka is created. The Yadavas move into Dwaraka. The Pandavas reach Ekachakra. Krishna is crowned king of Dwaraka. A spy brings news of Hidimba's death to Shakuni, Duryodhana and Dushasana. The Pandavas lead the life of Brahmins in Ekachakra.
044	Duryodhana asks for a crown to be made for him. Rukmini comes of marriageable age. Kunti and Bheema find out about the Brahmin host's trouble. Draupada is looking for a guru for Dhristadyumna when he is informed that Krishna performed the last rites of the Pandavas.
045	The Brahmin tells Kunti and Bheema about Bakasura. Rukmini is in love with Krishna. Bheema decides to go to Bakasura with the food. Shikandi is born to Draupada. Lord Shiva appears before Draupada and his wife and tells them that Shikandi will be responsible for Bheeshma's death. Rukmini wants to marry Krishna but her brother Rukmi wants her to marry Sishupala.
046	Bheema gets ready to take the food to Bakasura. Shikandi returns to Kampilya and shows her prowess in front of the Panchala court. Draupada gets Shikandi married to a woman thinking Shikandi is a man now. Shikandi's bride finds out she has married a woman.
047	Draupada agrees to send Dhristadyumna to Drona to learn warfare techniques. Kunti tells Yudhishtra and the rest of the Pandavas about Bheema's true strength. Dhirithrastra wants to crown Duryodhana as heir to the throne. Bheema takes the food to Bakasura, accompanied by a few soldiers. Karna presents a throne to Duryodhana.
048	Bheeshma stops the crowning of Duryodhana. Bheema waits outside Bakasura's cave and starts eating the food meant for Bakasura. An enraged Bakasura fights Bheema. Drona accepts Dhristadyumna as a disciple. Bheema kills Bakasura. Karna donates a portion of his wealth.
049	Ashwathamma and Kripi are unhappy with Drona's decision to tutor Dhristadyumna. The Pandavas leave Ekachakra. Vanjikodi's husband comes to Hathinapura asking for help in tracing his wife and sons. Shakuni asks Dushasana to go to Varanavata to find out the truth about the Pandavas. Rukmi arranges Rukmini's marriage with Sishupala. Rukmini's mother narrates the story of Paundrika.
050	A Brahmin from Vidharba brings a message from Rukmini to Krishna. Dushasana arrives at Varanavata looking for proof of the Pandavas' death. Draupadi dreams that she marries a Brahmin. Krishna carries off Rukmini in a celestial vehicle. Balarama fights Jarasandha and Sishupala.
051	Krishna fights and defeats Rukmi. Drona trains Dhristadyumna in sword fighting. Arjuna fights Chitrangadha (Angaraparna) and defeats him. Chitrangadha teaches Arjuna the satvika mantra and Arjuna teaches Chitrangadha the use of the Agni astra. Krishna and Rukmini get married.
052	Drona asks Dhristadyumna to kill him in battle as guru dakshina. Vyasa tells Kunti the reasons behind some of the incidents in her life. Dhristadyumna asks Draupada to go to Drona to find out what sort of task to give the participants in Draupadi's swayamvara. Vyasa asks the Pandavas and Kunti to go to Panchala.
053	The Pandavas reach Kampilya. Rukmini is against Krishna going to Draupadi's swayamvara. Jarasandha and Sishupala get invites to the swayamvara. Shakuni asks Karna to participate on behalf of Hasthinapura. Vyasa tells Vaishampayana the secret behind Dwapara and Kalipurush.
054	Shakuni and Gandhari perform a puja based on Atharvana Veda to help Gandhari beget children. Dwapara is born as Duryodhana. Shakuni explains to Dushasana the reason behind compelling Karna to participate in Draupadi's Swayamvara. Shalya explains his reasons for wanting to participate in the swayamvara.
055	Draupada meets Drona and asks him what sort of competition to have at Draupadi's swayamvara such that only Arjuna is able to win. Shakuni asks Bheeshma to light lamps in memory of the Pandavas. Draupada fashions a crown for Arjuna and explains his reason for wanting Arjuna for a son-in-law.
056	All the major warriors of the land turn up for Draupadi's swayamvara. Draupada is unhappy that Arjuna is not to be seen. Krishna tells Draupada that Karna is equally capable of winning the swayamvara. The Pandavas turn up for the swayamvara dressed as Brahmins.
057	Dhristadyumna informs the assembly of the task to be performed. All the kings try their hand at the task and fail one by one. Karna is stopped by Draupadi when he is about to succeed on the basis of his not being a kshatriya. Arjuna wins the competition and is garlanded by Draupadi.
058	The kshatriyas try to prevent Draupadi from leaving with a Brahmin. Krishna intervenes and Arjuna and Bheema leave with Draupadi. Krishna meets Draupadi and discloses the fact that the Brahmin who won the competition is none other than Arjuna. Dhristadyumna finds out that Arjuna won Draupadi at the competition.
059	Krishna meets Kunti. Dhristadyumna informs Draupada that Draupadi is with the Pandavas. Kunti asks the Pandavas to share Draupadi. Vidura informs Gandhari that Draupadi will come to Hasthinapura as a daughter-in-law. Krishna tells Kunti that a previous life's karma has decreed that all five Pandavas should marry Draupadi. Vyasa visits Kampilya.
060	Kunti tells Draupadi that the Pandavas are the sons of devas and that Dhirithrastra, Pandu and Vidura are the sons of Vyasa. Vyasa relates to Draupada and his wife and Krishna relates to Draupadi the story of Indrasena, born as Draupadi in this birth, who asked for a husband five times to Lord Shiva and got five husbands as a boon.
061	Vidura tells Sulabha that the Pandavas are alive and that Draupadi was won by Arjuna. Krishna asks the Pandavas to marry Draupadi. A spy confirms to Dushasana and Shakuni that the Pandavas are still alive. The Pandavas and Draupadi go to the palace at Kampilya. Shakuni sends Dushasana to find out if the Pandavas are alive. The Pandavas marry Draupadi.
062	Dushasana attends the marriage in disguise to confirm that the Pandavas are still alive. Dushasana informs Duryodhana, Shakuni and Karna that the Pandavas are alive. A messenger informs Bheeshma and Vidura that the Kauravas did not win the competition.
063	Duryodhana enlists Somadutta's help in fighting Panchala. Vidura informs Bheeshma that the winner of the competition was Arjuna. Vidura's message reaches Kampilya. Sahadeva finds the hidden meaning of the message. Dhirithrastra decides to send a messenger to Kampilya.
064	Vidura asks Dhirithrastra to wait for the official notice from Kampilya. Somadutta meets Duryodhana, Dushasana and Shakuni. Kunti pens the letter to Dhirithrastra. Narada informs Balarama that Draupadi married all the Pandavas. Krishna tells Balarama that the marriages were performed by Vyasa. Vidura convenes an emergency meeting of the Hastinapura court.
065	Duryodhana, Dushasana, Karna and Shakuni reach Hasthinapura. They ask for the conquest of Panchala. Draupada's message reaches Hasthinapura. Vidura and Bheeshma advise bringing the Pandavas back to Hasthinapura but the Kauravas are against this decision.
066	Duryodhana, Dushasana, and Shakuni meet Dhirithrastra to try and keep the Pandavas out of Hasthinapura. Karna meets Vidura. Gandhari asks Shakuni to leave Hasthinapura but Dhirithrastra is against the decision. Vidura gets ready to go to Panchala.
067	Gandhari goes back to Dhirithrastra. Dhristadyumna asks Arjuna to teach him to use the Brahmastra but Arjuna declines. Draupada receives word of Vidura's visit. Sahadeva pens a response to Vidura's letter. Bheeshma meets Drona and Kripacharya.
068	Vidura reaches Kampilya. Dhirithrastra requests everyone to get ready to receive the Pandavas. Duryodhana asks to be crowned heir apparent in Hasthinapura, but his request is declined. The Pandavas, Kunti and Draupadi arrive at Hasthinapura.
069	Shakuni advises Duryodhana to get close to his enemies in order to win. Pandu appears before Kunti and asks her to take things in hand. Kunti asks Vidura to start proceedings for crowning Yudishtra heir apparent. Vidura meets Dhirithrastra to discuss Kunti's request.
070	Dhirithrastra, Bheeshma, Vidura, Drona and Kripacharya meet to discuss the accession issue. Drona asks Ashwathama to stop taking tribute from Panchala. The Pandavas and Kauravas meet in an assembly to sort out the accession issue. Vidura asks Kanaka to find out whom the people want as crown prince.
071	Dhirithrastra meets Vyasa and asks him for advice. Balarama discusses Subadhra's marriage proposal with Krishna. Kanaka informs Vidura that most people want the Pandavas to rule Hasthinapura. Dhirithrastra tells Duryodhana to live in peace with the Pandavas, but he refuses to do so. Vidura goes to meet Vyasa to find a solution to the problem.
072	Vidura meets Vyasa. Kunti meets Bheeshma. Vyasa tells Vaishampayana that Vidura is an incarnation of the God of Dharma. Dhirithrastra asks Vidura and Bheeshma to offer a solution to the accession issue. Vidura suggests splitting Hasthinapura into two. Bheeshma flies into a rage.
073	Bheeshma goes to meet his mother, Ganga. She tells him to accept the decision to split the kingdom. Vidura and Kripacharya meet Bheeshma. Bheeshma agrees to splitting the kingdom into two. Shakuni convinces Dhirithrastra to give the arid Khandavaprastha region to the Pandavas.
074	Dhirithrastra asks Bheeshma and Vidura to carry out his orders. Bheeshma and Vidura meet Kunti and the Pandavas and inform them of the decision. Krishna tells Rukmini about Lakshmana's devotion. Bheeshma asks Dhirithrastra to anoint Yudhishtra as crown prince before the Pandavas leave for Kandavaprastha.
075	A soothsayer tells Subadhra that she will marry a sanyasi. Dhirithrastra tells Yudhishtra that he can leave for Khandavaprastha after he is crowned prince. Arjuna meets Drona, Draupadi meets Bheeshma and Yudhishtra, Bheema and Sahadeva meet Vidura requesting them to come to Khandavaprastha with the Pandavas. Duryodhana, Dushasana and Shakuni meet Vidura.
076	Krishna and Balarama are invited to Yudhishtra's coronation. Vyasa performs the ceremony. The Pandavas got to Khandavaprastha. Takshaka and the Nagas are unhappy, but Vasuki grants permission for the Pandavas to stay in Khandavaprastha. Lord Vishwakarma builds Indraprastha on Krishna's behest. Yudhishtra becomes king of Indraprastha.
077	A Brahmin meets Satyavati, Ambika and Ambalika in the forest. Bhooomadevi asks Krishna to lighten the Earth's burden by killing wrongdoers. Lord Shiva appears before Amba and tells her that her suicide in the previous birth was against nature and her sufferings in this birth are due to that. Dhirithrastra wants Duryodhana to marry Subhadra. Amba meets Satyavati, Ambika and Ambalika. Satyavati, Ambika and Ambalika die in a forest fire.
078	Jarasandha's son Sahadeva asks Krishna for help. News of Satyavati, Ambika and Ambalika's death reaches Hasthinapura. Dushasana and Shakuni go to Dwaraka to seek Subhadra's hand in marriage to Duryodhana. Arjuna is exiled for a year. Subhadra and Arjuna get married.
079	Duryodhana and Bhanumathi get married. Draupadi gives birth to Prativindhya, Sutasoma, Shrutakarma, Shatanika and Shrutasena. Subhadra gives birth to Abhimanyu. Banumathi gives birth to Lakshmana and Lakshmi. Bheema kills Jarasandha. Yudhishtra invites everyone to Indraprastha for the Rajasooya yagna. Bheeshma proposes Krishna's name for the first honor. Sishupala objects to this.
080	Krishna reminds Balarama of the promise made to Sishupala's mother. Sishupala insults Krishna 101 times and is killed by Krishna. Duryodhana falls into a pond of water at the Mayan sabha and Draupadi laughs at him. Duryodhana leaves for Hasthinapura with his family. Shakuni makes plans to usurp the wealth of the Pandavas.
081	Shakuni asks Duryodhana to invite the Pandavas to a game of dice. Vyasa warns Yudhishtra of bad times ahead. Krishna tells Bheema and Draupadi that one cannot escape the consequences of their karma/deeds. Dhirithrastra asks Vidura to invite the Pandavas to Hasthinapura.
082	Krishna marries Sathyabama and brings her to Dwaraka. Vidura invites Yudhishtra and the Pandavas to Hasthinapura but warns them of evil intentions. Shalva attacks Dwaraka to revenge Sishupala's death. Shakuni's reason for wanting to ruin Hasthinapura is shown.
083	Vikarna asks Dhirithrastra not to allow the game of dice. The Kauravas invite the Pandavas for a game of dice. Bheeshma sets the rules for the game. Duryodhana appoints Shakuni to play in his stead. Yudhishtra bets one asset after another but keeps losing.
084	Yudhishtra runs out of assets to bet and uses his brothers as bets. Yughishtra loses Sahadeva, Nakula, Arjuna and Bheema and finally himself in the game of dice. Duryodhana asks Yudhishtra to bet Draupadi in the game of dice. Vidura asks Dhirithrastra to put a stop to the game.
085	Yudhishtra loses Draupadi in the game of dice. Duryodhana first sends Pratikami to bring Draupadi to the court, but Draupadi refuses to come to court. Duryodhana then sends Dushasana to bring Draupadi to the court. Dushasana forcibly drags Draupadi to court.
086	Vikarna speaks in favour of the Pandavas. Duryodhana asks Dushasana to disrobe Draupadi. Krishna keeps Draupadi from being disrobed. Draupadi vows to braid her hair only after it is greased with Dushasana's blood. Gandhari prevents Draupadi from cursing the Kauravas.
087	Dhirithrastra returns everything that the Yudhishtra lost in the game of dice. Shakuni asks Duryodhana to convince Dhirithrastra to invite the Pandavas for another game of dice. Dhirithrastra requests for another game of dice in front of an assembled court.
088	Shakuni proposes that whoever loses the game of dice should live in the forest for twelve years and not be found by the other party during the thirteenth year. Yudhishtra loses the game of dice and the Pandavas prepare to leave for the forest. Vidura requests that Kunti live with him for thirteen years. Bheema vows to kill all the Kauravas in battle.
089	News of the game of dice reaches Dwaraka. Krishna decides to visit the Pandavas. Balarama decides to go to Hasthinapura. Dhaumya tells the rest of the Pandavas that they are equally to blame for the game of dice. Draupada and Drishtadyumna decide to meet the Pandavas. Yudhishtra gets the akshaya patra from Surya.
090	Shakuni plots to use the asura Kirmira to kill the Pandavas. Rishis Vyasa and Maitreya visit Hasthinapura. Dhirithrastra asks them to advise Duryodhana. Duryodhana insults rishi Maitreya and rishi Maitreya curses him for his arrogance and ego saying that he will be killed by Bheema.
091	Kirmira challenges Bheema to a duel and is killed by him. Draupada and Dhristadyumna meet the Pandavas in the forest. Dhirithrastra is unhappy with Vidura's advice and dismisses him from the post of minister. Shakuni asks Duryodhana and Dushsana to make Dhirithrastra reverse the decision.
092	Draupadi asks Krishna why he didn't help her earlier. Duryodhana placates an enraged Balarama. Krishna informs Arjuna and Bheema that they would be given the opportunity of viewing Lord Shiva and Lord Hanuman respectively. Dhirithrastra sends a messenger to recall Vidura back to Hasthinapura. Shikandi meets a Yaksha.
093	The Yaksha tells Shikandi that he can temporarily change her into a man. Vidura goes back to Hasthinapura. The Yaksha asks Shikandi, now a man, to come back in time for him to retransform into a man as women are not allowed in Kubera's palace. Arjuna goes in search of celestial weapons. There is a magic mirror at Dwaraka which tells you who you are thinking of. Shakuni and Dushasana go to meet the asura Mooka.
094	Shakuni tells Mooka to kill Arjuna for the benefit of the asura race. Mooka attacks Arjuna but is killed. Arjuna fights with a hunter, who turns out to be Lord Shiva. Arjuna gets the Pashupatastra from Lord Shiva and goes to heaven with Indra. Shakuni asks Karna to learn the use of celestial weapons from rishi Parashurama.
095	Karna becomes rishi Parashurama's disciple. Karna learns to use the Brahmastra from rishi Parahurama. Kubera curses the Yakshya Shulakarna to permanently become a woman. He tells Shulakarna the curse will be lifted only after Shikandi's death. Urvashi curses Arjuna to transform into a eunuch.
096	Rishi Parashurama curses Karna. Shikandi permanently becomes a man. Urvashi reduces the time period of her curse to one year, and that too of Arjuna's choosing. Bhima meets Hanuman in the forest. Duryodhana, Dushasana and Shakuni make plans to go to the forest and make fun of the Pandavas. Arjuna defeats the Nivatakavachas.
097	Arjuna joins the rest of the Pandavas in the forest. Shikandi wishes to learn warfare from Drona. The Kauravas come to the forest and make fun of the Pandavas. The Gandharva Chitrangadha opposes the presence of the soldiers of Hasthinapura. Dushasana asks for permission to settle the issue.
098	Dushasana is captured by the Gandharva. The Gandharva then goes in search of Duryodhana. He knocks out Karna and takes Duryodhana and Shakuni captive. Shikandi becomes Drona's disciple. Banumathi goes to the Pandavas for help. Arjuna and Bheema free Duryodhana, Dushasana and Shakuni and bring them to Yudhishtra.
099	Yudhishtra asks Bheema to free Duryodhana, Dushasana and Shakuni. Duryodhana grants Yudhishtra a boon which Yudhishtra says he will claim at a later stage. Shikandi excels in his training. Duryodhana jumps into a bonfire. The asura Daitreya saves Duryodhana and brings him to the netherworld, advises him and sends him back to Earth.
100	Ashwathamma asks Drona to get a promise from Shikandi, as guru dakshina, that he should never enter into battle. But Drona refuses to do so. Karna sets out to conquer the kingdoms around Hasthinapura. Karna returns victorious from his conquests. Dhirithrastra requests the Pandavas to attend a yagna at Hasthinapura, but they decline.
101	Kusela (Sudama) lives in poverty. Shakuni plots to kidnap Draupadi. Jayadratha's name is suggested for the job. Kusela comes to Dwaraka to meet Krishna on the insistence of his wife. Jayadratha waits in the forest for an opportunity to kidnap Draupadi. Jayadratha knocks out sage Dhaumya and kidnaps Draupadi.
102	Bheema and Arjuna rescue Draupadi and take Jayadhratha captive. Kuchela gives Krishna a bag of beaten rice. Kuchela's house transforms into a palace and his poverty-ridden life comes to an end. Jayadhratha's head is shaved as punishment and he is made a slave of the Pandavas. Jayadhratha does penance towards Lord Shiva. Rishi Dhurvasa visits Hasthinapura.
103	Duryodhana and Dushasana wait on Rishi Dhurvasa. Abhimanyu is grown-up. Duryodhana asks Rishi Dhurvasa to visit the Pandavas in the forest. Lord Shiva grants Jayadratha the boon of being undefeated for a day in battle. Balarama trains Abhimanyu in weapon usage. Dhurvasa visits the Pandavas and asks for food. Draupadi calls Krishna for help.
104	Krishna satisfies the hunger of the rishis with one morsel of food. A spy informs Duryodhana of the failure of his plan. Shakuni requests Dushasana to bring Sage Kalmuni to perform a yagna using Atharvana Veda to kill the Pandavas. The Pandavas near the end of the twelfth year in the forest. Kalmuni asks the ghost that appears from the fire to kill the Pandavas.
105	Kanaka informs Vidura about Kalmuni's yagna. Narada informs Yama of Kalmuni's yagna and the means to save the Pandavas. Chitrasena, in the guise of a boy, runs off with the akshaya patra. Draupadi chases after him. The Pandavas find Draupadi. Yudhishtra sends Sahadeva for water. One by one all the Pandavas go in search of water, but do not return. Yudhishtra goes looking for them. The ghost from the yagna finds the dead bodies of the Pandavas and goes back to Kalmuni.
106	The enraged ghost consumes Kalmuni. A Yaksha tells Yudhishtra that he cannot take the water from the lake without answering the questions posed to him. Yudhishtra answers all the questions satisfactorily. All the Pandavas come back to life.
107	The Pandavas start their thirteenth year. Kanaka meets the Pandavas. Sahadeva asks Bheema to bring along a dead body. The Pandavas reach the borders of the Matsya kingdom and hide their weapons in a tree and hang the body from it. The Pandavas and Draupadi enter service in King Virata's palace as Kanka, Ballava, Brihanala, Grantika, Tantripala and Sairandhri. Keechaka meets Sairandhri.
108	Duryodhana tries to trick Kunti and Vidura into disclosing the location of the Pandavas. Krishna gets ready to fight Narakasura. Duryodhana, Dushasana and Shakuni try to get the location of the Pandavas from Kanaka. Keechaka pursues Sairandhri into the Matsya court.
109	Yudhishtra stops Bheema from killing Keechaka in court. Krishna meets Narakasura in battle. Krishna acts as though he is wounded. Satyabama fights and kills Narakasura. Dushasana visits Matsya and enquires if the Pandavas are hiding there. Keechaka identifies the Pandavas and Draupadi.
110	Keechaka asks Draupadi to go to bed with him in return for maintaining the secret of her identity. Krishna takes the Karpaga vriksha to Earth with him in return for defeating Narakasura. Draupadi asks Keechaka to come to the dance hall at night. Bheema kills Keechaka.
111	Keechaka is found dead. The Upakeechakas blame Sairandhri and plan to burn her on Keechaka's pyre. Bheema kills the Upakeechakas also. News of Keechaka's death reaches Hasthinapura. Shakuni suspects Bheema's hand in Keechaka's death. Susharma comes to Hasthinapura.
112	Dhirithrastra gives the order to attack Virata. Susharma attacks Virata on one front. Bheema goes with Virata to battle Susharma. Meanwhile, the Hasthinapura army attacks Virata on another front. Uttara and Brihanala face Hasthinapura's army.
113	Arjuna puts everyone to sleep using the sammohan astra and takes away their ornaments. Rukmini and Satyabama compete to find out who loves Krishna more. The Pandavas come out of hiding. Abhimanyu's and Uttaraa's marriage is proposed. Somadutta informs the Kauravas that Arjuna was identified after the end of the thirteenth year.
114	Somadutta says that according to the solar calendar the thirteen years were not up when Arjuna came out of hiding. Duryodhana sends a messenger to the Pandavas asking them to go back to the forest for twelve years. The Pandavas respond saying that the elders in Hasthinapura would decide whether Arjuna was identified before the thirteen years were up.
115	Duryodhana and Arjuna go to Dwaraka to ask Krishna for support. Arjuna asks for Krishna, Duryodhana gets the Narayani sena with Kritavarma as the general. Draupadi meets her sons. The invitation for Abhimanyu's marriage reaches Hasthinapura. Narada meets Lord Surya.
116	Kunti is refused permission to attend Abhimanyu's marriage. Lord Surya warns Karna of Lord Indra's intentions. Karna donates his kavacha and kundala to Lord Indra who is in the guise of a Brahmin. Lord Indra gives Karna the Shakti astra. Abhimanyu and Uttaraa are married.
117	Kunti meets Karna. Shakuni, Duryodhana and Dushasana ask Karna to accept the Nagastra. Karna receives the Nagastra. Dhirithrastra convenes the court to decide on whether to give back Indraprastha to the Pandavas. Dhirithrastra decides to send Sanjaya as an emissary to the Pandavas.
118	Sanjaya meets the Pandavas and gives them Dhirithrastra's veiled message to go back to the forest. Draupadi and Shikandi clash. Dhirithrastra advises Duryodhana to give back Indraprastha to the Pandavas, but he refuses. Bheema and the other Pandavas favour war.
119	Yudhishtra requests Krishna to go on a peace mission to Hasthinapura. The Panchalas meet Krishna. Shakuni informs Duryodhana, Dushasana and Karna that Krishna is on his way to Hasthinapura to act as a peace emissary. Vidura and Bheeshma ask Dhirithrastra to inform Duryodhana to behave with courtesy towards Krishna.
120	Dhirithrastra informs the court about Krishna's peace mission. All the Kuru elders meet Krishna and invite him in to Hasthinapura. Krishna refuses to stay in the palace and goes to Vidura's house to stay. Krishna meets Kunti in Vidura's place.
121	Krishna asks Vidura whom he will fight for, the Pandavas or the Kauravas. Krishna come to the Hasthinapura court on his peace mission. Duryodhana insults Vidura and Vidura breaks the bow that he got from Vishnu. Shakuni makes Krishna's chair fall into a pit. Krishna shows his vishwaroop to an awe-struck court.
122	Krishna tells Kunti to go to Karna and inform him that she is his mother in order to save the rest of the Pandavas. Kunti meets Karna and reveals that she is his birth mother. Kunti asks Karna to join with the Pandavas, but he refuses to do so.
123	Karna remembers several incidences from his past and his friendship with Duryodhana. Kunti asks Karna to promise that he wouldn't kill any of the Pandavas in battle. Karna promises not to kill any of the Pandavas other than Arjuna in battle. Bheeshma meets Krishna outside Hasthinapura.
124	Duryodhana requests for war against the Pandavas and is opposed by Vikarna. Krishna reaches Virata and details the Pandavas about the failure of the peace mission. Dhirithrastra declares war on the Pandavas. Shakuni asks Karna about Kunti's visit. Sahadeva extracts a boon from Krishna that the Pandavas would not be killed in the battle. Shakuni makes plans to win over Shalya.
125	Kunti meets Drona and asks him not to take part in the battle. Duryodhana builds a palace for Shalya. The Pandavas and Kauravas meet to decide on the rules of combat. A date is decided for the battle. Arjuna and Uloopi's son Iravan joins the Pandava ranks. Shalya informs the Pandavas of how he was tricked into joining the Kauravas.
126	Duryodhana and Shakuni meet Sahadeva and ask him for a good day for the ritual battle sacrifice. Sahadeva asks them to do so on the next Amavasya. Krishna makes the sun and moon gods meet one day before Amavasya and tells Yudhisthra to offer the sacrifice on that day. The Kauravas gather together to choose a commander-in-chief. Bheeshma is chosen as the Kaurava commander-in-chief and Dhristadhyumna is chosen as the Pandava commander-in-chief. Bheeshma lays down the condition that he will not kill the Pandavas in battle.
127	The Pandavas and Kauravas meet to lay down the rules for combat. Bheeshma reminds everyone of the proper rules for combat. Ulooka requests Shakuni to stay out of the battle, but Shakuni refuses. Bheeshma names the Adhirathas of the Kaurava army and tells Karna that he cannot enter into battle as long as Bheeshma is in command of the Kaurava army.
128	The Pandavas meet Kunti and Vidura and ask Kunti to leave Hasthinapura, but she refuses. Yuyutsu and Vikarna try to convince Duryodhana and Dushasana to stop the war and to return Indraprastha. Duryodhana and Dushasana meet Kunti and Vidura. Krishna meets Karna.
129	Krishna reminds Karna that Kunti is his mother and the Pandavas are his brothers. Vyasa meets Dhirithrastra and gives Sanjaya divine vision to see the incidences on the battlefield. The armies face each other on Kurukshetra. Arjuna asks Krishna how it would be right for him to kill his own relatives in battle.
130	Krishna extols about the secrets behind birth and death and tells Arjuna that he and Krishna had been born on Earth several times before. Krishna tells Arjuna that Draupadi's disrobing is not a personal issue but a public issue. He also tells Arjuna that he, Krishna, alone is the biggest truth on Earth.
131	Krishna grants Arjuna divine vision and shows Arjuna his supernatural form. Arjuna is ready for battle. Yudhishtra seeks the blessings of Bheeshma, Drona, Kripa and Shalya. Yuyutsu joins the Pandavas. The war begins. Abhimanyu faces Bheeshma. Shalya kills Uttara. Bheeshma kills Shwetha.
132	The first day of battle ends. Uttara's and Shwetha's final rites take place. The second day of war begins. Arjuna faces Bheeshma. Dhristadhyumna faces Drona. Bheema and Drona face off. Satyaki and Abhimanyu face Bheeshma. Dushasana fights Satyajit. Virata fights Kripacharya. The second day of war comes to an end.
133	A spy brings news to Duryodhana that the Pandavas intend to use the Ardhachandra formation on the next day. Shakuni proposes using the Garuda formation. The third day of battle begins. Shikandi goes after Bheeshma but Shakuni sends Ulooka to intervene. Abhimanyu and Dushasana face off. The third day of battle comes to a close. Somadutta informs Duryodhana that there is no bow equal to Arjuna's Gandeeva.
134	The fourth day of battle begins. The Pandava army is in the Chandra formation and the Kaurava army is in the Garuda formation. Yudhishtra fights Vikarna. Bheema faces Bheeshma. Satyaki and Vikarna fight each other. Arjuna faces Bheeshma. Bheema finds Dushasana on the battlefield. Duryodhana sends some of the Kauravas to help Dushasana but Bheema kills all eight of them. The fourth day of battle comes to a close. Duryodhana requests Bheeshma to allow Karna to fight, but is refused. The fifth day of battle begins. The Kaurava army is in the Makhara formation. The Pandava army is in a bird formation. Arjuna faces Ashwathamma. Kripacharya faces Abhimanyu. Satyaki and Duryodhana clash with maces. Boorishravas intervenes. Somadutta holds back Satyaki while Boorishravas kills Satyaki's ten sons. Vikarna and Bheema clash. The fifth day of battle ends.
135	Satyaki swears on the bodies of his sons to kill Boorishravas in battle. The sixth day of battle begins. The Kaurava army is in Makhara formation while the Pandava army is in Krauncha formation. Yudhishtra and Shakuni fight each other. Bheema yet again finds Dushasana on the battlefield, but Duryodhana comes to Dushasana's aid. Dhristadhyumna puts both of them to sleep, but Drona awakens them. The sixth day of battle comes to a close. Krishna tells the Pandavas that they cannot win without killing Bheeshma.
136	The seventh day of war begins. The Kauravas use the Mandala formation while the Pandava army is in the Vajra formation. Draupada and Drona clash. Shalya fights Shikandi. Baghadatta and Bheema fight against each other while Virata and Boorishravas face off. Iravan kills eight of Shakuni's sons. Bheeshma decimates the Pandava forces. The seventh day of battle comes to an end. Karna tries to join the battle, but Bheeshma refuses the offer. Krishna asks Draupadi to meet Karna.
137	Draupadi meets Karna and insults him, calling him a coward. The eighth day of battle begins. The Kauravas use the Kurma formation, the Pandavas use the Trishul formation. Bheema and Dushasana clash. Duryodhana fights Drishtadhyumna. The Kauravas come to the aid of Dushasana. Bheema kills sixteen of the Kauravas. The eighth day of war ends. Kunti meets Dhirithrastra and Gandhari. Bheeshma promises to kill the Pandavas in battle and divines five arrows infused with the power of his bramacharya to kill the Pandavas.
138	A spy brings news to the Pandavas of Bheeshma's vow. Duryodhana meets Bheeshma and takes the five arrows back with him. Krishna asks Arjuna to request Duryodhana to give him the five arrows in the name of Yudhishtra. Duryodhana gives Arjuna the five arrows in repayment to Yudhishtra for being saved from Chitrangadha in the forest. Draupadi meets Bheeshma and asks for a long life for her husbands.
139	The ninth day of battle begins. The Kuravas use the Sarvatobhadra formation, the Pandavas use the Padma (Lotus) formation. Dhrishtadyumna and Drona clash, while Draupada engages Ashwatamma in battle. Duryodhana fights Yudhishtra. Shikandi and Dushasana clash. Bheema kills Alambusha. Bheeshma and Arjuna fight. Kishna charges at Bheeshma with discus raised. Arjuna promises to fight to the best of his ability. The ninth day of battle comes to a close. Sahadeva suggests giving a sacrifice to tilt the balance in favour of the Pandavas. Yudhishtra and Krishna meet Bheeshma and ask him for a way to kill him. Bheeshma suggests using Shikandi.
140	Iravan is chosen as the war sacrifice. His last wish is to get married. As no girl comes forward to marry him Krishna dresses as a woman and appears as the bride for Iravan. Iravan and Krishna are married and Iravan is sacrificed. Kali blesses Iravan saying that his head would be alive for the rest of the war enabling him to see the rest of the war. Bheeshma meets Ganga before the battle. Shikandi rides with Arjuna in his chariot. The tenth day of battle begins. The Pandava army is in the Deva formation and the Kaurava army is in the Asura formation.
141	Arjuna advances on Bheeshma. Shikandi stands in between Arjuna and Bheeshma. Bheeshma refuses to engage Arjuna in combat. Arjuna rains arrows on Bheeshma. As Bheeshma falls on a bed of arrows, Amba's revenge is realized. The tenth day's battle comes to an end. Bheeshma asks Arjuna for a headrest, and then for water to quench his thirst.
142	Vrishasena informs Karna of Bheeshma's fall. Draupadi meets Bheeshma. Shikandi begs for forgiveness from Bheeshma. Sulabha informs Kunti of Bheeshma's fall. Karna meets Bheeshma. Bheeshma tells Karna that he knows that Karna is Kunti's son.
143	Shakuni asks Duryodhana to bring Karna into battle the next day. Yudhishtra asks Krishna for a means to defeat Karna. Drona is chosen as the next commander-in-chief of the Kaurava army. Karna and Vrishasena get ready to enter the battlefield.
144	Bheeshma remembers incidences from his past: his father's marriage to Ganga, his training under Sage Parashurama, his meeting with his father, his vow, the "death" of the Pandavas in the lac palace, the splitting of Hasthinapura, the disrobing of Draupadi, the exile of the Pandavas, the peace mission of Krishna, the declaration of war, and his fall at the hands of Arjuna.
145	The eleventh day of battle begins. The Kauravas use the Garuda formation, the Pandavas use the Krauncha formation. Karna faces and defeats Virata. Shakuni and Sahadeva face off while Drona takes on Yudhishtra. Arjuna prevents Drona from capturing Yudhishtra. Jarasandha's son Sahadeva fights Karna. Abhimanyu captures Lakshmana. Duryodhana asks Drona for help. Drona frees Lakshmana from Abhimanyu's grasp. The eleventh day of battle ends. Somadutta suggests taking Arjuna far away from Yudhishtra so that Drona can capture Yudhishtra. Susharma and the Shamshastakas take on that task.
146	Duryodhana asks Drona to capture Yudhishtra. Satyaki brings news of Susharma and the Shamshastakas. The twelfth day of battle begins. The Pandavas use the Mandala formation and the Kauravas counter with the Garuda formation. Drona faces Yudhishtra. Baghadatta challenges Arjuna. Baghadatta uses the Vaishnava astra against Arjuna but it takes refuge in Krishna. Arjuna kills Baghadatta. Arjuna comes to the aid of Yudhishtra but Susharma challenges him to a duel. Satyajit comes to Yudhishtra's aid but is killed by Drona. Ashwatamma kills Neela. Bheema and Dhrihtadyumna come to Yudhishtra's aid. The twelfth day of battle comes to a close.
147	Drona promises to either capture Yudhishtra or kill one of the maharathis of the Pandava army. Draupada meets Drona. Drona decides to use the Chakra formation. Uttaraa is found to be pregnant. Susharma and the shamshastakas once more decide to pull Arjuna away from the main battle and Jayadratha comes forward to take up the job of defending the Chakra formation once it is broken. The thirteenth day of battle begins. The Kaurava army is in the Padma formation and the Pandava army uses the Chandra formation.
148	Susharma and the shamshastakas goad Arjuna to fight them and pull him away from the main battle. Drona gives the order to change the formation to Chakra formation. Abhimanyu comes forward to break the Chakra formation. Jayadratha stops the other Pandavas from following Abhimanyu into the Chakra formation. Abhimanyu kills Lakshmana and injures Durmasana (Dushasana's son). Abhimanyu fights Dushasana and a host of Kaurava warriors.
149	Duryodhana, Dushasana, Karna, Shakuni, Ashwatamma, Drona and Kripacharya attack Abhimanyu together. Drona destroys Abhimanyu's chariot, but Abhimanyu picks up a pair of swords and fights the Kauravas. Duryodhana, Dushasana, Karna, Shakuni and Ashwatamma attack Abhimanyu with swords but he fights them off with a wheel of his chariot. Durmasana and Jayadratha kill Abhimanyu. Arjuna kills Susharma. Prativindya informs Subhadra and Uttaraa of Abhimanyu's death.
150	Duryodhana performs the last rites of Lakshmana. Arjuna learns of Abhimanyu's death. Kunti and Sulabha receive news of Abhimanyu's death. Arjuna attacks the Kaurava camp and tries to kill Jayadratha. Arjuna takes up an oath to either kill Jayadratha in battle the next day or kill himself by self-immolation if he failed to do so.
151	News of Arjuna's vow reaches Gandhari, Kunti, Sulabha and Dushala. Jayadratha wishes not to participate in the battle. Drona decides to use the Needle formation. Jayadratha's father Vridhakshatra gets a boon from Lord Shiva that whoever makes his son's head fall to the ground that person's head will burst into pieces and he will die. Arjuna prays to Lord Shiva for help.
152	Krishna asks Bheema to kill as many Kauravas as possible. The fourteenth day of battle begins. The Kauravas use a Shakata formation followed by a Needle formation. The Pandavas do not use a formation. Arjuna and Drona face off. Arjuna seeks Drona's blessings and moves on towards Jayadratha. Drona gives Duryodhana special armour and asks him to face Arjuna. Arjuna destroys the armour using a divine weapon and defeats Duryodhana. Bheema kills eight of the Kauravas. Yudhishtra sends Satyaki after Arjuna for help. Arjuna and Sudhayu face off. Krishna takes Sudhayu's weapon on himself and it turns on and kills Sudhayu.
153	Boorishravas intercepts Satyaki. Arjuna cuts off Boorishravas' arm when he tries to attack an unconscious Satyaki. Satyaki regains consciousness and beheads Boorishravas. Drona faces Yudhishtra. Bheema comes to Yudhishtra's aid and breaks Drona's chariot with his mace. Yudhishtra sends Bheema after Satyaki and Arjuna. Kripacharya challenges Arjuna to combat but is defeated, as is Ashwatamma. Bheema kills more of the Kauravas. Duryodhana sends Karna to help his brothers. Vikarna chastises Karna for using a bow on a warrior who is armed with a mace. Shakuni tells Jayadratha to go into hiding. Arjuna defeats Shalya.
154	The sun appears to set. Arjuna prepares to immolate himself. Jayadratha comes out of hiding to witness Arjuna's death. Krishna recalls his Chakra and the sun comes out again. Arjuna beheads Jayadratha using the bow he got from Lord Shiva. The head falls in Vridhakshatra's lap and then onto the ground and Jayadratha's father dies. Sanjaya informs Dhirithrastra, Gandhari and Dushala of Jayadhratha's death.
155	Sulabha informs Kunti of Jayadhratha's death. The Pandavas meet Dushala, Kunti and Gandhari in the Kaurava camp. Duryodhana orders for nighttime battle. Bheema calls upon Ghatotkacha to help out in the battle. Draupadi goes to meet Dushala.
156	Ghatotkacha decimates the Kaurava army. Shakuni calls upon Alambusha to counter Ghatotkacha. Ghatotkacha kills Alambusha. Drona tells Duryodhana that he will use celestial weapons to kill Ghatotkacha, but Lord Indra intervenes. Satyaki kills Somadutta. Drona kills Virata and Draupada. Duryodhana asks Karna to use Lord Indra's Shakti astra on Ghatotkacha.
157	Karna uses the Shakti astra on Ghatotkacha. The astra wounds Ghatotkacha fatally. Krishna asks Ghatotkacha to increase his size and fall on the Kaurava army in order to cause maximum damage. Krishna tells Yudhishtra that Drona will lay down arms only if he finds out Ashwatamma is dead. Gandhari and Kunti meet Bheeshma.
158	Ashwatamma tries to kill Duryodhana, but Karna intervenes. Krishna and Draupadi raise doubts in Drona's mind about Ashwatamma's immortality. A spy brings news to Duryodhana that the Pandavas have devised a plan to kill Drona in battle. The fifteenth day of battle begins. Drona faces Arjuna and decides to use the Brahmastra on Arjuna, but Lord Brahma intervenes. Bheema kills an elephant named Ashwatamma and informs Drona that Ashwatamma is dead. Yudhishtra lies that Ashwatamma (Drona's son) has been killed in battle. Drona lays down arms and starts meditating on the battlefield. Drishtadhyumna beheads Drona.
159	Ashwatamma uses the Narayanastra on the Pandavas but Krishna tells the Pandavas to throw down their weapons and submit to the astra, thus saving them from the weapon. Arjuna tries to kill Dhrishtadyumna but Draupadi intervenes. Karna is appointed commander-in-chief.
160	Karna meets Bheeshma. The sixteenth day of war begins. The Kauravas are in the Makhara formation and the Pandavas counter using the Ardhachandra formation. Bheema and Ashwatamma clash. Kripacharya worries Dhrishtadyumna. Vikarna challenges Bheema to a duel. Bheema kills Vikarna. Karna defeats Nakula. Karna and Arjuna face off. Karna defeats Arjuna but lets him go. The sixteenth day of war comes to an end.
161	Karna asks for Shalya to be his charioteer on the next day of battle. Shalya accepts the proposal. Kunti meets Gandhari. A spy informs the Pandavas that Shalya will be Karna's charioteer on the next day. Krishna meets Kunti and Gandhari. Kunti goes to meet Karna.
162	The seventeenth day of battle begins. Vrishasena defeats Satyaki and challenges Arjuna. Arjuna kills Vrishasena. Karna defeats Sahadeva. Karna gets news of Vrishasena's death. Bheema decimates the Kaurava brothers. Dushasana comes to their aid. Bheema defeats Dushasana and carries him towards Draupadi. Bheema then tears off Dushasana's hand, rips open his chest and offers the blood to Draupadi in fulfillment of his oath.
163	Karna defeats Yudhishtra in battle but does not kill him. Arjuna and Ashwatamma clash. Arjuna meets Yudhishtra in his tent. Karna and Arjuna meet on the battlefield. They resort to the use of divine weapons. Karna uses the Nagastra on Arjuna but Krishna saves Arjuna by making the chariot go down by a few inches. The Nagastra tries to attack Arjuna on its own but Arjuna destroys it.
164	Karna's chariot's wheel sinks into the ground. Shalya deserts Karna. Karna gets off the chariot to pull the wheel out of the ground. Arjuna shoots an arrow at Karna when he is on the ground. Karna tries to invoke the Brahmastra but is unable to do so. Arjuna kills Karna. Kunti mourns Karna's loss on the battlefield. The Pandavas and Kauravas learn that Kunti is Karna's mother. Yudhishtra curses all womankind.
165	Krishna informs the Pandavas about Karna's promises to Kunti. He also informs them that the Brahmin who cursed Karna, Parashurama, Indra, Kunti, Shalya and Krishna himself were responsible for Karna's defeat. Shakuni meets Bheeshma. Krishna goes to meet Shakuni. Krishna asks Yudhishtra to fight Shalya.
166	Gandhari transfers the power she gained through her worship of Shiva to Duryodhana ensuring that he remain unharmed, except if struck on his thighs. Yudhishtra kills Shalya. Sahadeva kills Ulooka and Shakuni. Duryodhana hides at the bottom of a lake but a hunter tells the Pandavas where to find him. Bheema and Duryodhana fight. Bheema breaks Duryodhana's thighs in the mace fight. Ashwathamma, Kritavarma and Kripacharya attack the Pandava army at night and kill all the Upapandavas and the Pandava army. Duryodhana passes away. Gandhari curses Krishna. The Pandavas go after Ashwatamma. Ashwatamma releases the Brahmastra on them. Arjuna counters with his Brahmastra but recalls it on sage Narada's bidding. Ashwatamma, unable to recall his Brahmastra, diverts it to Uttaraa's womb. Krishna curses Ashwatamma. Ashwatamma gives up the jewel on his forehead. Krishna brings Uttaraa's son to life and names him Pareekshit. Yudhishtra is crowned king. The Pandavas, Krishna and Vyasa go to meet Bheeshma. Bheeshma gives up his life during Uttarayana.
