= Roja (2019 TV series) =

2019 Indian television series

- Genre: Drama
- Written by: M Anantha Kumar; Dialogues; Marpu Srinivas (1-120); Murali Ramesh (121-300)
- Screenplay by: Shanmugam; Shekar; Vemuri Sriram Kumar
- Directed by: Hariprasad Gattreddy
- Creative director: Prince Immanuel
- Starring: Sharanya Turadi Sundarraj; Princy B Krishnan; Munna; Sri Lakshmi; Jackie; Anil; Sailatha
- Country of origin: India
- Original language: Telugu
- No. of episodes: 300

Production
- Producer: B. R. Vijayalakshmi
- Camera setup: Multi-Camera
- Running time: 20-22 minutes
- Production company: Saregama

Original release
- Network: Gemini TV
- Release: 11 March 2019 – 27 March 2020

Roja (transl. Rose) is an Indian Telugu language soap opera directed by Hariprasad Gattreddy aired on Gemini TV from 11 March 2019 to 27 March 2020. It is a remake of Tamil television series of the same name on Sun TV. The serial was interrupted by the COVID-19 lockdown. The serial initially starred Sharanya Turadi Sundarraj, but she was later replaced by Princy B Krishnan, Munna as protagonists and Priyanka in pivotal role. The serial was stopped abruptly due to COVID-19 lockdown.

== Plot ==
Roja is an optimistic girl who was raised in an orphanage. Due to some unexpected turns of events, she met with her biological father but they both don't know about the reality. On the other hand, the male lead Arun Raj, criminal lawyer hates love and marriage but falls in love with Roja. Now, how it all happens and how Roja comes to know about her biological father.

== Cast ==
=== Main ===
- Sharanya Turadi Sundarraj / Princy B Krishnan as Roja Arun / Anu
- Munaf "Munna" Rahman as Arun Raj: A criminal lawyer
- Priyanka as Priya: fake Anu

=== Supporting ===
- Jackie as Pratap: Arun, Ashwin and Deepa's father
- Sailatha as Kalpana: Arun, Ashwin and Deepa's mother
- Taruntej as Ashwin: Arun's younger brother
- Shabeena as Pooja
- Sri Lakshmi as Annapurna: Arun, Ashwin and Deepa's grandmother
- Nirmala Reddy as London Chamundeswari: Annapurna's elder sister
- Anil as Chandrakanth: Roja's biological father
- Dwarakesh Naidu as Satyamurthy: Roja's foster father and Premalayam Ashramam caretaker
- Gowri as Sakshi
- Gopal Krishna Akella as Naveen: Arun's assistant
- Aditya as Pooja's father
- Durga Devi as Pooja's mother
- Vijay Yadav as Sambhaiah, Sakshi's uncle
- Lavanya as Rajyam: Arun, Ashwin and Deepa's aunt
- Krishna Teja as Bala Krishna: Rajyam's husband
- Nirmala as Sumathi
- Sindhuja as Deepa: Arun's younger sister
- Venu Kshatriya as Vishal
- Srinivas as Chalapathi: Chandrakanth's younger brother
- Srilatha as Triveni: Roja's mother (cameo appearance)

=== Former lead ===
- Sharanya Turadi Sundarraj as Roja (replaced by Princy B Krishnan)
- Purna Sai as Santhosh: Roja's friend
- Bramar as Ashwin (replaced by Taruntej)

== Adaptations ==
Language	Title	Original release	Network(s)	Last aired	Notes	Ref.
Tamil	Roja ரோஜா	9 April 2018	Sun TV	3 December 2022	Original	
Kannada	Sevanthi ಸೇವಂತಿ	25 February 2019	Udaya TV	Ongoing	Remake	
Telugu	Roja రోజా	11 March 2019	Gemini TV	27 March 2020	Remake	
Hindi	Sindoor Ki Keemat सिंदूर की कीमत	18 October 2021	Dangal TV	29 April 2023	Remake	
Malayalam	Kaliveedu കളിവീട്	15 November 2021	Surya TV	22 September 2024	Remake	
Bengali	Saathi সাথী	7 February 2022	Sun Bangla	3 August 2024	Remake	
Marathi	Tharala Tar Mag! ठरलं तर मग!	5 December 2022	Star Pravah	Ongoing	Remake	
