= Amit Bhargav =

Indian actor

- Born: 25 November 1989 (age 36); Bangalore, Karnataka, India
- Occupations: Actor; television presenter; voice actor
- Years active: 2010-present
- Spouses: Sriranjani
- Children: 1

Amit Bhargav is an Indian actor who has appeared in films and television shows in Tamil, Kannada, and Hindi. He became popular for his role in the Kannada television series Seethe in which he played Lord Rama. He was noted for his short role in Abhishek Verman's 2 States (2014). He is most known for his role as Arjun in the Tamil television series Kalyanam Mudhal Kadhal Varai. He went on to perform supporting roles in Tamil films, including Yennai Arindhaal (2015), Miruthan (2016) and Aranmanai 3 (2021). He has also voiced for characters in both Kannada and Tamil film industry.

== Television ==
Year	Show	Role	Language	Channel	Notes
2010	Seethe	Lord Rama	Kannada	Udaya TV	
2013	Bigg Boss Kannada Season 1	Voice of Bigg Boss	Kannada	ETV Kannada	
2013	Mahabharatham	Lord Krishna	Tamil	Sun TV	
2014	Bigg Boss Kannada Season 2	Voice of Bigg Boss	Kannada	Asianet Suvarna	
2014–2017	Kalyanam Mudhal Kadhal Varai	Arjun/Malli	Tamil	Star Vijay	
2016	Achcham Thavir	Contestant	Tamil	Star Vijay	
2017	Mappillai	Deepak (Special Appearance)	Tamil	Star Vijay	
2017–2019	Nenjam Marappathillai	ACP Vikram Siva Kumar	Tamil	Star Vijay	
2019–2020	Kannadi	Host	Tamil	Kalaignar TV	
2020	Kanmani	Venu (Special Appearance)	Tamil	Sun TV	
2020–2022	Thirumathi Hitler	Abinav Janardhan (AJ)	Tamil	Zee Tamil	
2024	Mr. and Mrs. Chinnathirai Season 5	Participant with Wife	Tamil	Star Vijay	
2025	Bigg Boss season 9	Contestant	Tamil	Star Vijay	Wildcard ContestantEvicted Day 83

== Web series ==
- All web series are in Tamil.

Year	Serial	Role	Channel
2018	Doll House Diaries	Sanjay	MX Player
2023	Maaya Thotta	Ranjan	Hungama
2024	Heart Beat	Madhan	Disney+ Hotstar

== Filmography ==
Year	Film	Role	
2014	Vizhi Moodi Yosithaal		
2014	2 States	Harish	Hindi film
2014	Yennamo Yedho	Dr. Anand	
2015	Yennai Arindhaal	Thenmozhi's Proposed Groom	
2015	Enakkul Oruvan	Hero	Cameo appearance
2016	Miruthan	Dr. Naveen	
2017	Kuttram 23	Aravind	
2017	Mixture Potlam	Home Minister Son (Main lead)	
2019	Charlie Chaplin 2	Sara's Brother in law	
2021	Chakra	Ganesh	
2021	Aranmanai 3	Samikannu	
2023	Maruthi Nagar Police Station	Gurunathan	
2023	Appatha	Paavadai Saami	
2023	Lucky Man	Amarnath Ramachand	
2023	Rangoli	Raavanan	

- All films are in Tamil, unless otherwise noted..

== As Dubbing artist ==
Year	Film	For Whom	Notes
2013	Vikramdada	Abhimanyu Singh	Credited as Bhargav
2013	Thalaivaa	Abhimanyu Singh	
2015	Thani Oruvan	Harish Uthaman	Credited as Bhargav
2017	Velaikkaran	Anish Kuruvilla	
2017	Puthiya Bruce Lee	main villain	

== Awards and honours ==
Year	Provider	Award	Award Type	Show	Recipient	Result
2017	Vijay TV	Vijay Television Awards	Best Actor Male	Kalyanam Mudhal Kaadal Varai	Amit Bhargav	Won
2017	Vijay TV	Vijay Television Awards	Best On-Screen Pair	Kalyanam Mudhal Kaadal Varai	Amit Bhargav & Priya Bhavani Shankar	Nominated

Year	Provider	Award	Award Type	Show	Recipient	Result
2015	Vijay TV	Vijay Television Awards	Best Find of the Year	Kalyanam Mudhal Kaadal Varai	Amit Bhargav & Priya Bhavani Shankar	Won
