= Chennai Ungalai Anbudan Varaverkirathu =

2015 Indian film by Maruthu Pandian

- Theatrical release poster
- Directed by: Maruthu Pandian
- Produced by: Maruthu Pandian
- Starring: Bobby Simha; Prabhanjayan; Sharanya Turadi; Linga
- Cinematography: Vinod Rathnasaami
- Edited by: Kiran K Naveen
- Music by: Camlin-Raja
- Production companies: ATM Productions; Kariyampatti Studios
- Release date: 10 April 2015
- Running time: 127 minutes
- Country: India
- Language: Tamil

Chennai Ungalai Anbudan Varaverkirathu (transl. Chennai welcomes you with love) is a 2015 Indian Tamil-language drama film, written and directed by Maruthu Pandian. The film stars an ensemble cast featuring Bobby Simha, Prabhanjayan, Sharanya Turadi and Linga amongst others. Music for the film was composed by the Camlin-Raja duo and the film was released on 10 April 2015.

== Cast ==
- Bobby Simha as Chellapandi
- Alphonse Putharen as Dilli
- Prapanjayan as Nagaraj
- Saranya Ponvannan as Vinodhini
- Linga as Karthik
- I. B. Karthikeyan
- Watson Veeramani
- Nisha Krishnan
- Marudhu Pandian
- Charles Suresh
- Madhudapathi
- Kiran K Naveen
- Vicky Singh

== Production ==
Maruthu Pandian revealed that the film would be a satire based on several experiences from his life, and would focus on bachelors who reside in small-sized rooms in large numbers across Chennai. Maruthu Pandian later accused Bobby Simha of disregarding the project as a result of his rise to fame after Jigarthanda (2014), and had demanded 35 lakh rupees to complete dubbing work.

== Soundtrack ==
The soundtrack was composed by Camlin-Raja.

- Mazhai Thuligal – Anuradha Sriram
- Velicham – Yasin Nizar

== Reception ==
Sify gave the film a negative review, citing that it was "amateurish" and that it would have done better if it had "better dialogues, better actors, better screenplay, better production value, better technicalities, better theme and better climax". Likewise, the critic from The Times of India wrote "the director is clearly going for a new-age vibe but with one leg rooted firmly in melodrama, the film ends up as a muddled affair". Malini Mannath of The New Indian Express wrote, "There is a realistic tone almost throughout, and the first half is finely crafted and executed. But in the second half the director seems losing his grip on the narration".
