= Aayiram Muthangaludan Thenmozhi =

2012 Indian film by Shanmugarajan

- Official poster
- Directed by: Shanmugarajan
- Written by: Shanmugarajan
- Produced by: Anand
- Starring: Venkatesh; Sharanya Turadi Sundarraj
- Cinematography: Joshi; Saravanan
- Edited by: Xian
- Music by: Taj Noor
- Production company: City Lights Entertainment
- Release date: 23 March 2012
- Country: India
- Language: Tamil

Aayiram Muthangaludan Thenmozhi (transl. Thenmozhi with a thousand kisses) is a 2012 Indian Tamil-language romance film written and directed by Shanmugarajan and starring Venkatesh and Sharanya Turadi Sundarraj (credited as Akshara). It was released on 23 March 2012.

== Cast ==
- Venkatesh as Ramesh
- Sharanya Turadi Sundarraj as Thenmozhi
- Dr. Shalini as herself

== Production ==
The director Shanmugharajan, an associate of Cheran, used seventy one newcomers as actors for the film. A month long training camp was set up before the film began shooting. Each of the film's sixty-two scenes were each shot individually in a single shot, which was the trial shot. The shots were then edited and reshot.

== Soundtrack ==
The songs were composed by Taj Noor. Lyricist Yugabharathi used ten tirukkurals for the song "Palodu Thaen Sera".

Song	Lyricist	Singer(s)
"Satham Sathamindri"	Tharangai Surya	Swetha Mohan
"Karaikkal"	Shanmugarajan	Harish Iyer, Hemambika
"Palodu Thaen Sera"	Yugabharathi	Raheeb Aalam, Rajalakshmi
"Dan Dan Dan"	Gnanakaravel	Velmurugan, Ananthu, A. R. Reihana
"Un Peyer Enna"	Uvari Sukumar	Niwas
"My Dear Purusha"	Eknath	Ananthu, Priyadarshini, Shanmugarajan
"Theendatha Theeyai"	Gnanakaravel	Karthik, Padmalatha

== Reception ==
N. Venkateswaran from The Times of India wrote, "To be fair to Venkatesh and Akshara, they have ably delivered what was demanded of them. They are unfortunately let down by a poor screenplay".
