= Vaidhegi Kaathirundhaal =

Indian television series

- Genre: Family drama
- Written by: V.Padmavathy; Pradeep Panicker
- Directed by: Siva Sekar
- Starring: Sharanya Turadi Sundarraj; Munaf "Munna" Rahman
- Theme music composer: Ilayavan
- Country of origin: India
- Original language: Tamil
- No. of seasons: 1
- No. of episodes: 40

Production
- Producer: Thillainathan K.
- Production location: Chennai
- Cinematography: K.C.Ramesh
- Editors: Kurunji Nathan; B.S Gopinath
- Running time: approx. 20–22 minutes per episode
- Production company: Muthu Digital Studios

Original release
- Network: Star Vijay; Disney+ Hotstar
- Release: 20 December 2021 – 23 April 2022

Vaidhegi Kaathirundhaal is a 2021 Indian Tamil-language family drama television series starring Sharanya Turadi Sundarraj and Munaf "Munna" Rahman. The series premiered on 20 December 2021, and aired on Star Vijay. It was also available on the digital platform Disney+ Hotstar before its telecast. The serial abruptly stopped, with last episode telecast on 23 April 2022.

== Plot ==
Amuthanayaki is a kind woman who lives happily with her daughter. However, their world crumbles when her granddaughter goes missing in the village fair. A few years later, Vaidhehi's mother passes away and she is left with her son Anand.

Vaidehi is now grown up and is called Poornima. She makes a living by offering false witness accounts in the high court premises.

In a quirk of fate Poornima is asked to impersonate Vaidehi and inherit Amuthanayaki's wealth by her relatives.

When Poornima reaches the house she slowly begins to remember her past and realises that she is the real Vaidehi. How she gets out of this mess and permanently reunites with her grandmother forms the rest of the story.

== Cast ==
=== Main cast ===
- Sharanya Turadi Sundarraj as Vaidehi a.k.a. Poornima (2021–2022)
  - She is the missing granddaughter of Ammuthanayaki
- Prajin (2021-2022) / Munaf "Munna" Rahman as Vijay Rajarathinam (2022)
  - He is Vaidehi's cousin and a generous guy

=== Supporting roles ===
- Latha as Amuthanayaki, Vijay's grandmother (2021–2022)
- Anitha Venkat as Akhilandeshwari Rajarathinam, Vijay's mother (2021–2022)
- Usha Elizabeth Suraj as Kaveri Subburatnam, Amuthanayagi's second daughter-in-law (2021–2022)
- Nirosha as Amrutha Kanagarathnam, Amuthanayagi's third daughter-in-law (2021–2022)
- Manush Manmohan as Lawyer Kanagarathnam, Amrutha's husband (2021–2022)
- Vignesh as Rajarathinam, Vijay's father (2021–2022)
- Pondy Ravi as Subburathnam, Kaveri's husband
- Bavithra as Aarathi, Kaveri's niece (2021–2022)
- Yogesh Venugopal as Mahesh, Vijay and Vaidehi's cousin (2021–2022)
- Baboos Baburaj as Poornima's adopted father (2021–2022)
- Stefy Remigus as Poornima's friend
- Sathya Raja as Kannan, Poornima's friend

=== Cameo appearances ===
- Tarun Yuvraaj as Young Vijay
- Yamuna Chinnadurai as Valliamma, Vaidehi's mother (died in serial)
- Gowthami Vembunathan as Poornima's adopted mother (photographic appearance only)
