= News18 Tamil Nadu =

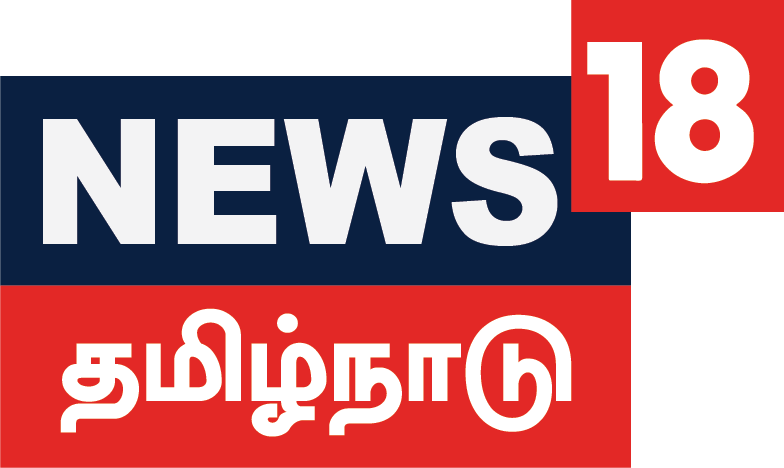
- Logo used since 2017
- Country: India
- Broadcast area: Tamil Nadu
- Headquarters: Chennai, Tamil Nadu, India

Programming
- Language: Tamil
- Picture format: 4:3 (576i, SDTV)

Ownership
- Owner: Network18 Group
- Sister channels: Network18 Group channels

History
- Launched: 24 August 2014; 11 years ago
- Former names: ETV Tamil

Links
- Website: tamil.news18.com

Availability

Streaming media
- Live Streaming: Watch Live

News18 Tamil Nadu is an Indian Tamil language 24 hour news channel based in Chennai. owned by Network18 Group.

== See also ==
- Network18 Group
- CNN-News18
