= 2026 in Tamil television =

The following is a list of events in the Tamil television dramas in 2026 that have been scheduled.

== Television shows ==
=== Drama series and variety shows debuting in 2026 ===
Date	Show	Tamil title	Network(s)	Genre	Status	Ref
January / தை
5	Suttum Vizhi Sudare	சுற்றும் விழிச் சுடரே	Star Vijay	Drama	Ongoing	
11	Anda Ka Kasam 4	அண்டா கா கசம் 4	Star Vijay	Game show	Ended	
19	Iru Malargal	இரு மலர்கள்	Sun TV	Drama	Ongoing	
19	Kanaa Kandenadi	கனா கண்டேனடி	Star Vijay	Drama	Ended	
25	Startup Singam 2	ஸ்டார்ட்அப் சிங்கம் 2	Star Vijay	reality show	Ongoing	
25	Killadi Jodis	கில்லாடி ஜோடிஸ்	Zee Tamil	reality show	Ended	
26	Azhagae Azhagu	அழகே அழகு	Star Vijay	Drama	Ongoing	
26	Vaagai Sooda Vaa	வாகை சூடவா	Zee Tamil	Drama	Ongoing	
February / மாசி
2	Manam	மனம்	Astro Vinmeen	Drama	Ended	
7	Jodi Are U Ready season 3	ஜோடி ஆர் யூ ரெடி 3	Star Vijay	dance reality show	Ended	
March / பங்குனி
8	Happy Wife Happy Life		Star Vijay	Couples game show	Ended	
23	Priyamanaval	பிரியமானவள்	Kalaignar TV	Drama (Re-run)	Ongoing	
April / சித்திரை
1	Raja Rani	ராஜா ராணி	Astro Vinmeen	Drama	Ended	
4	Cooku with Comali season 7	குக்கு வித் கோமாளி 7	Star Vijay	reality cooking show	Ended	
5	Comedy Kings	காமெடி கிங்ஸ்	Sun TV	Comedy show	Ended	
12	Iruvar	இருவர்	Kalaignar TV	Talk show	Ongoing	
22	Must Date the Playboy		Mediacorp Vasantham	Teen-Drama	Pending	
27	Thai Maaman	தாய் மாமன்	Star Vijay	Drama	Ongoing	
May / வைகாசி
9	Super Singer Junior season 11	சூப்பர் சிங்கர் ஜூனியர் சீசன் 11	Star Vijay	Singing show	Ongoing	
11	Thulasi	துளசி	Sun TV	Drama	Ongoing	
11	Kitchan Galatta	கிச்சன் கலாட்டா	Sun TV	Cooking show	Ongoing	
13	Thural	தூறல்	Astro Vinmeen	Drama	Ongoing	
17	Naanga Ready Neenga Readya 3	நாங்க ரெடி நீங்க ரெடியா 3	Sun TV	Reality show	Ongoing	
18	Palayathu Amman	பாளையத்து அம்மன்	Jaya TV	Devotional drama	Ongoing	
23	Mahanadigai 2	மகாநடிகை 2	Zee Tamil	reality show	Ended	
June / ஆனி
1	Thayamma Kudumbathaar 2	தாயம்மா குடும்பத்தினர் 2	DD Tamil	Melodrama	Ongoing	
13	Dance Jodi Dance season 4	டான்ஸ் ஜோடி டான்ஸ் 4	Zee Tamil	dance reality show	Ended	
21	Connect		Star Vijay	Game show	Ongoing	
29	Onna Irukka Kaththukkanum	ஒண்ணா இருக்க கத்துக்கணும்	Star Vijay	Drama	Ongoing	
29	Kadhal Kadhal Kadhal	காதல் காதல் காதல்	Star Vijay	Drama	Ongoing	
July / ஆடி
13	Chamanthi	சாமந்தி	Zee Tamil	Drama	Ongoing	
20	Siragugal	சிறகுகள்	Sun TV	Drama	Ongoing	
August / ஆவணி
3	83-84 Welcome Back to Our Life		DD Tamil	Drama	Ended	
13	Sakthi IPS 2	சக்தி ஐபிஎஸ் 2	DD Tamil	Drama	Ongoing	
September / புரட்டாதி
3	Bigg Boss 10		Star Vijay	Reality show	Ongoing	
13	Jackpot		Jaya TV	Game show	Ongoing	
28	Kurinji	குறிஞ்சி	Sun TV	Drama	Ongoing	
28	Abirami	அபிராமி	Sun TV	Drama	Ongoing	
October / ஐப்பசி
3	Sa Re Ga Ma Pa Seniors 6	ச ரி க ம ப சீனியர்ஸ் 5	Zee Tamil	Singing reality show	Ongoing	
4	Sun Singer	சன் சிங்கர்	Sun TV	Singing reality show	Ongoing	
19	Celebrity MasterChef Tamil	செலிபிரிட்டி மாஸ்டர்ஷெஃப் தமிழ்	Sony Vizha	Cooking reality show	Ongoing	
19	Sarojini	சரோஜினி	DD Tamil	Drama	Ongoing	
20	Crime Patrol	குற்றங்கள் தரும் எச்சரிக்கை	Sony Vizha	Crime series	Ongoing	
24	Tamil Idol	தமிழ் ஐடல்	Sony Vizha	Singing reality show	Ongoing	
25	Yaar Sari?	யார் சரி?	Jaya TV	Talk Show	Ongoing	
25	MIC Test 123	மைக் டெஸ்ட் 123	Jaya TV	Talk Show	Ongoing	
TBA
TBA	Mookuthi Amman	மூக்குத்தி அம்மன்	Zee Tamil	Devotional drama	Awaiting release	

=== Debut web series ===
Date	Show	Tamil title	Network(s)	Genre	Director	Status	Ref
January / தை
1	LBW: Love Beyond Wicket		JioHotstar	Sports drama	Ganesh Karthikeyan	Ended	
February / மாசி
27	Thadayam	தடயம்	ZEE5	Crime thriller	Navin Kumar	Ended	
March / பங்குனி
13	Resort	ரிசார்ட்	JioHotstar	Romantic comedy	Praveen Bennett	Ended	
13	Local Times	லோக்கல் டைம்ஸ்	Amazon Prime	Comedy drama	Naveen George Thomas	Ended	
27	Muthu Engira Kaattaan	காட்டான்	JioHotstar	Drama	M. Manikandan	Ended	
April / சித்திரை
10	Kaakee Circus	காக்கி சர்க்கஸ்	ZEE5	Fantasy, Crime	Ameen Barif	Pending	
May / வைகாசி
15	Exam	எக்ஸாம்	Amazon Prime	Crime thriller	A. Sarkunam	Ended	
22	Warrant	வாரண்ட்	ZEE5	Crime thriller	Prasanth Pandiyaraj	Ended	
25	Brothers and Sisters		JioHotstar	Romantic comedy	Chidambaram Manivannan	Ongoing	
June / ஆனி
26	Lingam	லிங்கம்	JioHotstar	Crime thriller	Lakshmi Saravanakumar	Pending	
July / ஆடி
13	Second Love	செகண்ட் லவ்	JioHotstar	Reality show		Ended	
30	Heart Beat 3	ஹார்ட் பீட் 3	JioHotstar	Medical drama	Deepak Sundarrajan	Ongoing	
August / ஆவணி
7	Vadhandhi: The Mystery of Mani	வதாந்தி: மணியின் மர்மம்	Amazon Prime	Crime thriller	Andrew Louis	Ended	
16	Bigg Boss The Common Man	பிக் பாஸ் - சாமானிய மனிதர்	JioHotstar	reality show		Ended	
September / புரட்டாதி
4	The Court	தி கோர்ட்	JioHotstar	Legal drama	Bala SB	Ongoing	
October / ஐப்பசி
2	Love	லவ்	Netflix	Romantic comedy	Balaji Mohan	Ended	
5	Thee Kural	தீ குறள்	ZEE5	Singing Show		Ended	
23	Sattamum Neethiyum 2	சட்டமும் நீதியும் 2	ZEE5	Time travel	Balaji Selvaraj	Ended	
30	Love Always		JioHotstar	Time travel	TBA	TBA	
November / கார்த்திகை
18	Mr & Mrs Office		JioHotstar	Romantic comedy	TBA	TBA	
TBA
TBA	Good Wife 2	குட் வைவ் 2	JioHotstar	Legal drama	Revathi	TBA	
TBA	Once Upon A Time in Kayamkulam		ZEE5	Comedy drama	Ameen Barif	TBA	
TBA	The Madras Mystery – Fall of a Superstar		SonyLIV	Historical drama	Surya Pratap	TBA	
TBA	Legacy		Netflix	Crime fiction	Charukesh Sekar	TBA	

== Ending this year ==
=== Series ending in 2026 ===
End date	Show	Tamil title	Network(s)	First aired	Total episodes	Genre	Ref
January / தை
3 January	Poongatru Thirumbuma	பூங்காற்று திரும்புமா	Star Vijay	28 April 2025	183	Psychological thriller	
14 January	Ilakkiya	இலக்கியா	Sun TV	10 October 2022	985	Drama	
14 January	Anandha Ragam	ஆனந்த ராகம்	Sun TV	29 August 2022	1043	Drama	
18 January	Anna	அண்ணா	Zee Tamil	22 May 2023	876	Drama	
18 January	Bigg Boss 9	பிக் பாஸ் 9	Star Vijay	5 October 2025	106	Reality show	
February / மாசி
1 February	Super Singer 11	சூப்பர் சிங்கர் 11	Star Vijay	2 August 2025	52	singing show	
March / பங்குனி
6 March	Police Police	போலீஸ் போலீஸ்	JioHotstar	19 September 2025	100	Police procedural	
21 March	Kaathuvaakula Rendu Kaadhal	காத்துவாக்குல ரெண்டு காதல்	Kalaignar TV	25 August 2025	176	Drama	
21 March	Rudhra	ருத்ரா	Kalaignar TV	29 September 2025	146	Revenge, Drama	
28 March	Sakthivel: Theeyaai Oru Theeraa Kaadhal	சக்திவேல்: தீயாய் ஒரு தீரா காதல்	Star Vijay	4 December 2023	707	Drama	
29 March	Ranjithame 4	ரஞ்சிதமே 4	Sun TV	31 July 2025	29	Reality show	
30 March	Manam	மனம்	Astro Vinmeen	2 February 2026	34	Drama	
April / சித்திரை
5 April	Samayal Express 2	சமையல் எக்ஸ்பிரஸ்	Zee Tamil	13 July 2025	32	Cooking show	
26 April	Killadi Jodis	கில்லாடி ஜோடிஸ்	Zee Tamil	25 January 2026	14	stunt/dare-based reality show	
May / வைகாசி
3 May	Jodi Are U Ready season 3	ஜோடி ஆர் யூ ரெடி 3	Star Vijay	7 February	26	dance reality show	
9 May	Punitha	புனிதா	Sun TV	14 October 2024	469	Drama	
9 May	Manamagale Vaa	மனமகளே வா	Sun TV	15 July 2024	543	Drama	
10 May	Comedy Kings	காமெடி கிங்ஸ்	Sun TV	5 April 2026	3	Comedy show	
16 May	Dhanam	தனம்	Star Vijay	17 February 2025	380	Drama	
June / ஆனி
7 June	Sa Re Ga Ma Pa Tamil Li'l Champs season 5	ச ரி க ம ப லிட்டில் சாம்பியன்ஸ் 5	Zee Tamil	6 December 2025	58	singing show	
14 June	Anda Ka Kasam 4	அண்டா கா கசம் 4	Star Vijay	5 January 2026	22	Game show	
26 June	Mahanadhi	மகாநதி	Star Vijay	23 January 2023	881	Drama	
26 June	Kanaa Kandenadi	கனா கண்டேனடி	Star Vijay	19 January 2026	121	Drama	
28 June	Gettimelam	கெட்டிமேளம்	Zee Tamil	20 January 2025	442	Drama	
July / ஆடி
18 July	Aadukalam	ஆடுகளம்	Sun TV	7 April 2025	439	Drama	
19 July	Happy Wife Happy Life		Star Vijay	8 March 2026	19	Couples game show	
23 July	LBW: Love Beyond Wicket		JioHotstar	1 January 2026	120	Sports drama	
25 July	Gowri	கௌரி	Kalaignar TV	22 January 2024	775	Mythology Drama	
June / ஆனி
7 June	Sa Re Ga Ma Pa Tamil Li'l Champs season 5	ச ரி க ம ப லிட்டில் சாம்பியன்ஸ் 5	Zee Tamil	6 December 2025	58	Singing Show	
August / ஆவணி
8 August	Vinodhini	வினோதினி	Sun TV	26 May 2025	367	Drama	
14 August	Sindhu Bairavi Kacheri Arambam	சிந்து பைரவி கச்சேரி ஆரம்பம்	Star Vijay	20 January 2025	410	Drama	
September / புரட்டாதி
13 September	Mahanadigai season 2	மகாநடிகை 2	Zee Tamil	23 May 2026	18	Reality show	
20 September	Dance Jodi Dance season 4	டான்ஸ் ஜோடி டான்ஸ் 4	Zee Tamil	13 June 2026	29	Dance show	
26 September	Pudhu Vasantham	புது வசந்தம்	Sun TV	26 June 2023	1003	Drama	
October / ஐப்பசி
24 October	Kayal	கயல்	Sun TV	25 October 2021	1555	Drama	
29 November	Malli	மல்லி	Sun TV	29 April 2024	1555	Drama	

== Tamil shows remakes in other languages ==
Original series	Language	Remake series	Premiere date	Channel	Ref
Pandian Stores 2	Hindi	Mahadev & Sons	5 January 2026	Colors TV	
Mahanadhi	Malayalam	Ee Puzhayum Kadannu	2 February 2026	Asianet	
Mahanadhi	Telugu	Godavari	11 May 2026	Star Maa	
Vilangu	Kannada	Raakshasa	20 February 2026	ZEE5	
Pudhu Vasantham	Kannada	Krishna Vamshi	2 March 2026	Sun Udaya	
Veera	Kannada	Krishna Rukku	9 March 2026	Zee Kannada	
Veera	Marathi	Deep Jyoti	13 April 2026	Zee Marathi	
Ayyanar Thunai	Marathi	Bai Tujha Ashirvaad	30 March 2026	Star Pravah	
Ayyanar Thunai	Hindi	Bareilly Ke Bachchan	8 June 2026	Colors TV	
Cooku with Comali	Malayalam	Comedy Cooks	18 April 2026	Zee Keralam	
Anna	Malayalam	Valyettan	20 April 2026	Asianet	
Lakshmi	Kannada	Mahalakshmi Maduve	3 July 2026	Sun Udaya	
Marmadesam	Telugu	Veerabhadruni Rahasyam	1 June 2026	ZEE5	
Ethirneechal	Telugu	Manchi Kutumbam	3 August 2026	Gemini TV	

== Time changing ==
Show	Channel	Moved from	Moved to	Ref
Lakshmi லட்சுமி	Sun TV	18 March 2024 - 17 January 2026; Monday - Saturday 14:30	19 January 2026 - 18 July 2026; Monday - Saturday 14:00	
Lakshmi லட்சுமி	Sun TV	19 January 2026 - 18 July 2026; Monday - Saturday 14:00	20 July 2026 - ongoing Monday - Saturday 15:00	
Parijatham பாரிஜாதம்	Zee Tamil	8 September 2025 - 24 January 2026; Monday - Saturday 21:30	26 January 2026 - ongoing Monday - Saturday 20:00	
Parijatham பாரிஜாதம்	Zee Tamil	26 January 2026 - 18 July; Monday - Saturday 20:00	20 July 2026 - ongoing Monday - Saturday 18:30	
Siragadikka Aasai சிறகடிக்க ஆசை	Star Vijay	23 January 2023 - 18 January 2026; Monday - Saturday 21:00	19 January 2026 - 24 January 2026; Monday - Saturday 21:00 to 22:00 (1 Hour)	
Siragadikka Aasai சிறகடிக்க ஆசை	Star Vijay	24 January 2026 - 18 July 2026 2026; Monday - Saturday 21:00	20 July 2026 - ongoing Daily 21:00	
Chinna Marumagal சின்ன மருமகள்	Star Vijay	5 October 2025 - 24 January 2026; Monday - Friday 19:30	26 January 2026 - ongoing Monday - Saturday 21:30	
Iru Malargal இரு மலர்கள்	Sun TV	19 January 2026 - 7 February 2026; Monday - Saturday 14:30 to 15:30 (1 Hour)	9 February 2026 - 18 July 2026; Monday - Saturday 14:30 (30 Minutes)	
Moondru Mudichu மூன்று முடிச்சு	Sun TV	19 August 2024 - 7 February 2026; Monday - Saturday 20:30 (30 Minutes)	9 February 2026 - ongoing Monday - Saturday 20:30 to 21:30 (1 Hour)	
Singapennae சிங்கப்பெண்ணே	Sun TV	9 October 2023 - 7 February 2026; Monday - Saturday 21:00	9 February 2026 - ongoing Monday - Saturday 21:30	
Ethirneechal Thodargiradhu எதிர்நீச்சல் தொடர்கிறது	Sun TV	23 December 2024 - 7 February 2026; Daily 21:30	9 February 2026 - ongoing Daily 22:00	
Aadukalam ஆடுகளம்	Sun TV	7 April 2025 - 8 February 2026; Daily 22:00	9 February 2026 - 18 July 2026; Monday - Saturday 15:00	
Dhanam தனம்	Star Vijay	11 August 2025 - 28 March 2026; Daily 15:30	30 March 2026 - 16 May 2026; Monday - Saturday 13:30	
Lakshmi லட்சுமி	Sun TV	19 January 2026 - 18 July 2026; Monday - Saturday 14:00	20 July 2026 - ongoing Monday - Saturday 14:30	
Iru Malargal இரு மலர்கள்	9 February 2026 - 5 September 2026; Monday - Saturday 14:30	7 September 2026 - ongoing Monday - Saturday 19:30		
Malli மல்லி	23 December 2024 - 10 October 2026; Daily 22:30	12 October 2026 - ongoing Monday - Saturday 12:30		
Ethirneechal Thodargiradhu எதிர்நீச்சல் தொடர்கிறது	9 February 2026 - 11 October 2026; Daily 22:00	12 October 2026 - ongoing Daily 22:30		

== See also ==
- List of years in Tamil television
