= Ramya Krishnan filmography =

The following is the filmography of Indian television and film actress Ramya Krishnan. She is predominantly known for her work in Telugu and Tamil films, along with appearances in Kannada, Malayalam and Hindi films.

Key
†	Denotes films that have not yet been released

== Telugu ==
List of Telugu films and roles
Year	Title	Role	Notes	Ref.
1984	kanchu kagada			
1986	Bhale Mithrulu			
1987	Chakravarthy	Lakshmi		
1987	Sankeerthana	Keerthana		
1987	Dayamayudu			
1987	Krishna Leela	Leela		
1987	Madana Gopaludu	Gowri		
1988	Bava Marudula Saval	Ramya		
1988	Asthulu Anthasthulu	Radha		
1988	Collector Vijaya			
1988	Coolie			
1988	Sri Devi Kamakshi Kataksham	Parvathi Devi, Kanchi Kamakshi	Dubbed in Tamil as Kaakkum Kamakshi	
1988	Bhama Kalapam	Kavitha		
1988	Sankellu			
1989	Gopala Rao Gari Abbayi	Seeta		
1989	Swathi Chinukulu	Santhi		
1989	Paila Pacheesu	Saranya		
1989	Pinni	Rekha		
1989	Sutradharulu	Seethaalu	Nominated—Filmfare Award for Best Actress – Telugu	
1990	Iddaru Iddare	Aruna		
1990	Mamasri	Neelima		
1990	Dagudumuthala Dampathyam	Radha		
1990	Agni Pravesam	Sahithi		
1990	Alludugaru	Revathi		
1991	Parama Sivudu	Sita		
1992	Balarama Krishnulu	Lalitha		
1992	Allari Mogudu	Mohana		
1993	Bangaru Bullodu	Rani		
1993	Allari Priyudu	Lalitha	Nominated—Filmfare Award for Best Actress – Telugu	
1993	Major Chandrakanth	Hema		
1993	Kirayi Gunda			
1993	Allari Alludu		Special appearance in song "Ninnu roaddu meedha"	
1993	Brundavanam	Latha Devi		
1994	Criminal	Ramya	Bilingual film; also shot in Hindi	
1994	Hello Brother	Manga		
1994	Allari Premikudu	Swapna		
1994	Muddula Priyudu	Sandhya		
1994	Jailor Gari Abbai	Vyjayanthi		
1994	Mugguru Monagallu	Naga Mani		
1995	Ammoru	Ammoru	Dubbed in Tamil as Amman; dubbed in Hindi as Maa Ki Shakti	
1995	Gharana Bullodu	Papaji		
1995	Super Mogudu	Ramya Krishna		
1995	Alluda Mazaaka	Pappi		
1995	Aayanaki Iddaru	Ramya		
1995	Maya Bazaar		Cameo	
1995	Muddai Muddugumma	Roja		
1995	Raja Simham	Latha		
1996	Soggadi Pellam	Janaki		
1996	Amma Ammani Chudalani Undhi	Janaki		
1996	Pellala Rajyam	Rajani		
1996	Dharma Chakram	Sandhya		
1996	Adhirindhi Alludu	Lakshmi		
1996	Vamsanikokkadu	Radha Bai		
1997	Annamayya	Timmakka		
1997	Aahvaanam	Rajeswari		
1997	Chilakkottudu	Bombay Papa	Cameo	
1997	Chinnabbayi	Uma Devi		
1997	Devudu	Shanti		
1997	Evandi Pelli Cheskondi	Kasthuri		
1997	Evandi Mana Ammayi			
1998	Love Story 1999	Raaji		
1998	Chandralekha	Chandra		
1998	Deergha Sumangali Bhava	Vaani		
1998	Kante Kuthurne Kanu	Jyothi	Nominated—Filmfare Award for Best Actress – Telugu	
1998	Kante Kuthurne Kanu	Jyothi	Won—Nandi Special Jury Award	
1998	Ooyala	Swapna		
1999	Premaku Velayara		Special appearance in song "Chinna Gownu Vesukunna"	
1999	Iddaru Mitrulu	Shanti		
1999	English Pellam East Godavari Mogudu	Sirisha		
1999	Maanavudu Daanavudu	Sithara		
1999	Aavide Syamala	Syamala		
2000	Durga	Amman	Special appearance	
2000	Devullu	Kanakadurga, Bhramarambika	Special appearance	
2000	Kauravudu	Sashi		
2000	Manasu Paddanu Kaani	Madhavi		
2000	Kshemamga Velli Labamgarandi	Baby Bhagavathula Bala Tripura Sundari		
2000	Sammakka Sarakka	Sammakka		
2000	Vamsoddarakudu	Satyabhama		
2000	Oke Maata			
2001	Budget Padmanabham	Ramya		
2002	Nilambari	Malli		
2003	Simhadri		Special appearance in song "Chinnadamme Cheekulu"	
2003	Tiger Harischandra Prasad	Rajeswari		
2003	Maa Alludu Very Good	Prabhavati		
2004	Kedi No. 1	Radha & Seeta		
2004	Sri Anjaneyam	Siva Prasad's wife, Anji's mother	Special appearance	
2004	Kushi Kushiga	Bhavani		
2004	Adavi Ramudu		Special appearance in song "Jantanu Vidadeese"	
2004	Varam			
2004	Naani		Cameo	
2004	Anji		Special appearance in song "Chikubuku Pori"	
2004	Raktha Kanneeru	Kantha		
2005	Naa Alludu	Bhanumati		
2006	Sri Krishna 2006	Bhanumati		
2007	Tulasi	Dr Surekha		
2008	Raju Maharaju	Ramya	Won—Nandi Award for Best Supporting Actress	
2008	Mr. Girisham	Madhuravani		
2008	Hero	Triveni Naik		
2008	Indrajit	Principal Stella Madam		
2009	Anjani Putrudu	Seethammavaru	Special appearance	
2009	Konchem Ishtam Konchem Kashtam	Raja Lakshmi	Won—Filmfare Award for Best Supporting Actress – Telugu	
2010	Ranga The Donga	Bhavani Prasad's wife		
2012	Yamudiki Mogudu	Ayyoni		
2014	Sri Vasavi Kanyaka Parameswari Charitra	Adhiparasakthi, Parvathi Devi		
2015	Mama Manchu Alludu Kanchu	Priyamvada		
2015	Baahubali: The Beginning	Sivagami Devi	Won—Filmfare Award for Best Supporting Actress – Telugu; Won—Nandi Award for Best Supporting Actress; Won—SIIMA Award for Best Supporting Actress – Telugu	
2016	Soggade Chinni Nayana	Satyabhama		
2016	Jaguar	Krishna's mother	Bilingual film; also shot in Kannada	
2017	Hello	Sarojini		
2017	Balakrishnudu	Bhanumati Devi		
2017	Baahubali 2: The Conclusion	Sivagami Devi	Won—Filmfare Award for Best Supporting Actress – Telugu	
2018	Shailaja Reddy Alludu	Shailaja Reddy	Nominated—SIIMA Award for Best Supporting Actress – Telugu	
2021	Romantic	Ramya Gowarikar		
2021	Republic	Vishaka Vani		
2022	Liger	Balamani	Bilingual film; also shot in Hindi	
2022	Bangarraju	Satyabhama		
2023	Rangamarthanda	Raju Garu	Nominated—Filmfare Award for Best Supporting Actress – Telugu	
2024	Guntur Kaaram	Vaira Vasundhara		
2024	Purushothamudu	Vasundhara		
2025	Baahubali: The Epic	Sivagami Devi	Combined re-release version of The Beginning and The Conclusion	
2027	Paakashala Pantham †		Direct OTT Release in ETV Win	
2027	Sri Sri †		Bilingual film; shot in Telugu and Tamil	
2027	Lubber Pandhu Telugu †		Remake of Tamil movie Lubber Pandhu	
2027	Raaka †		multilingual film; shot in Hindi Telugu and Tamil	
2027	David Reddy †	Kamala Reddy	Release in Pan India	
2027	Queen †	Chief Minister Lakshmi pranathi	Chief Minister of the then undivided Andhra Pradesh	

=== Dubbing artist ===
List of film credits as dubbing artist
Year	Film	Actress	Language
2002	Khadgam	Sonali Bendre	Telugu

== Tamil ==
List of Tamil films and roles
Year	Title	Role	Notes	Ref.
1983	Vellai Manasu	Raji	Tamil Debut	
1985	Paartha Gnabagam Illayo	Kasturi / Lalitha	Dual role	
1985	Padikkadavan	Manju		
1986	Sarvam Sakthimayam	Goddess Kaliamman		
1986	Muthal Vasantham	Nithya		
1986	Pudhiya Poovithu	Alli		
1987	Vilangu	Kavitha		
1987	Aankalai Nambathey	Ananthi		
1987	Per Sollum Pillai	Rekha		
1987	Jallikattu	Ramya Krishnan (TV anchor)	Guest appearance	
1988	Kunguma Kodu	Shanthi		
1988	Katha Nayagan	Mrs. Nanthagopal	Guest appearance	
1988	Thambi Thanga Kambi	Chithra		
1989	Meenakshi Thiruvilayadal	Urvashi	Guest appearance	
1990	Nalla Kaalam Porandaachu	Inspector Uma		
1990	Puthiya Charithiram	Geetha		
1990	Puthu Paatu	Stephie	Guest appearance	
1990	Sathya Vaakku	Anitha		
1991	Sigaram	Aparna		
1991	Vaa Arugil Vaa	Chandra		
1991	Captain Prabhakaran	Poongodi		
1992	Thambi Pondatti	Mala		
1992	Naane Varuven	Shape shifting Cobra	Guest appearance in song "Pogathe Ennai Thaandi"	
1992	Vaaname Ellai	Subathra		
1993	Pon Vilangu	Raani		
1993	Maathangal Ezhu	Savitri		
1993	Dhool Parakuthu	Raasathi		
1995	Raja Enga Raja	Lakshmi		
1995	Marri		Partially reshot	
1999	Padayappa	Neelambari	Won—Filmfare Award for Best Actress – Tamil; Won—Tamil Nadu State Film Award Special Prize	
1999	Paattali	Kannamma		
2000	Thirunelveli	Azhagamma (Dancer)	Guest appearance	
2000	Rajakali Amman	Goddess Rajakali Amman		
2000	Budget Padmanabhan	Ramya		
2000	Rhythm	Dancer	Guest appearance	
2000	Pottu Amman	Amman	Special appearance	
2001	Nageswari	Nageswari		
2001	Vaanchinathan	Nandhini		
2001	Sri Raja Rajeshwari	Raja Rajeshwari		
2001	Asathal	Gowri		
2001	Narasimha	Onam Festival Dancer	Guest appearance	
2001	Parthale Paravasam	Commère	Guest appearance	
2002	Panchathantiram	Maragathavalli alias Maggie		
2002	Yai! Nee Romba Azhaga Irukke!	Doctor	Guest appearance	
2002	Baba	Neelambari	Guest appearance	
2002	Jaya	Jaya		
2003	Annai Kaligambal	Annai Kaligambal / Parvathy		
2003	Julie Ganapathi	Viji Balakumaran		
2003	Anbe Anbe	Dancer	Guest appearance	
2003	Paarai	Vasantha		
2003	Kaakha Kaakha	Club Dancer	Guest appearance	
2003	Kurumbu	Madam (Dancer)		
2004	Kuthu	Dancer	Guest appearance	
2004	Kanavu Meippada Vendum	Varalakshmi	Playback singer for song "Thazhampoove Vaa Va"	
2007	Kuttrapathirikai	Divya		
2009	Kutti Pisasu	Goddess Kinathadi Kaali		
2009	Arumugam	Malini Devi		
2015	Baahubali: The Beginning	Sivagami Devi	Bilingual film; shot in Telugu and Tamil	
2015	Aambala	Periya Ponnu		
2017	Baahubali 2: The Conclusion	Sivagami Devi	Bilingual film; shot in Telugu and Tamil Partially reshot version	
2017	Mupparimanam	Herself	Guest appearance in song "Let's Go Party"	
2018	Thaanaa Serndha Koottam	Azhagu Meena (Jhansi Rani)	Nominated—Filmfare Award for Best Supporting Actress – Tamil	
2019	Super Deluxe	Leela		
2019	Dev	Padmavathy		
2019	Vandha Rajava Thaan Varuven	Nandhini Prakash		
2023	Jailer	Vijaya Pandian aka "Viji"		
2026	Gatta Kusthi 2	Judge Raja Rajeshwari	Special appearance	
2026	Jailer 2	Vijaya Pandian aka "Viji"		
2027	Sri Sri †		Bilingual film; shot in Telugu and Tamil	
2027	Pocket Novel †	Leela		
2027	Raaka †		multilingual film; shot in Hindi Telugu and Tamil	

== Kannada ==
List of Kannada films and roles
Year	Title	Role	Notes	Ref.
1988	Shakthi	Shwetha	Kannada Debut	
1988	Krishna Rukmini	Rukmini		
1993	Gadibidi Ganda	Mohana		
1998	Mangalyam Tantunanena	Radha		
2000	Yare Nee Abhimani	Prajna		
2000	Sneha	Kavya		
2001	Andhra Hendthi			
2001	Neelambari	Malli / Akhila Sriram "Neelambari" / Durga		
2002	Chamundi		Cameo in song "Usaravalli"	
2002	Ekangi	Shilpa		
2003	Raja Narasimha	Soundarya		
2003	Shri Kalikamba	Shri Kalikamba, Parvathi		
2003	Raktha Kanneeru	Kantha		
2004	Baa Baaro Rasika	Ramya		
2004	Naanu Naane		Cameo in song "Neenade Neenade"	
2013	Sweety Nanna Jodi	Vasundhara Devi	Nominated—SIIMA Award for Best Actor in a Negative Role – Kannada	
2014	Maanikya	Lavanya	Extended Cameo Appearance	
2016	Jaguar	Krishna's mother	Bilingual film; also shot in Telugu	
2017	Anjani Putra	Anjana Devi		

== Malayalam ==
List of Malayalam films and roles
Year	Title	Role	Notes	Ref.
1986	Neram Pularumbol	Nancy	Malayalam Debut	
1988	Anuragi	Annie		
1988	Bheekaran			
1988	Orkkappurathu	Sherin		
1988	Janmandharam	Rekha		
1988	Aryan	Nirmala		
1989	Devadas	Chandramukhi		
1991	Kadhanayika	Sharada		
1992	Aham	Mariana		
1992	Australia	Sandra		
1992	Manyanmaar	Radhika		
1996	Mahathma	Nancy		
2001	Kakkakuyil	Dancer	Guest appearance in "Megharagam" song	
2002	Onnaman	Kamala		
2007	Ore Kadal	Bela		
2015	Appavum Veenjum	Merlin		
2016	Aadupuliyattam	Matangi	Nominated—SIIMA Award for Best Supporting Actress - Malayalam	
2019	Aakasha Ganga 2	Soumini Devi		

== Hindi ==
List of Hindi films and roles
Year	Title	Role	Notes	Ref.
1988	Dayavan	Dancer	Hindi Debut	
1993	Khal Nayak	Sofia		
1993	Parampara	Tara		
1995	Criminal	Ramya		
1996	Chaahat	Reshma Narang		
1997	Banarasi Babu	Madhubala Choubey		
1997	Loha	Karishma		
1997	Shapath	Kavita Kallu		
1998	Wajood	Shalini/Sofia/Amina		
1998	Bade Miyan Chhote Miyan	Neha		
2022	Liger	Balamani		
2025	Jaat	Vasundara		
2027	Police station mein bhoot †			
2027	Raaka †		multilingual film; shot in Hindi Telugu and Tamil	
TBA	Tera Yaar Hoon Mein † Sj Surya movie	Lead Role with Amitabh bachchan	The two actors amitabh bachchan ramya krishnan were also slated to reunite for the bilingual film Uyarndha Manidhan (2019/2020), which marked Amitabh Bachchan's Tamil cinema debut, though the movie has remained largely under wraps	

=== OTT / Web series ===
List of Webseries and OTT Projects
Year	Project	Role	Language	Platform	Notes
2019	Queen	A fictional character named Sakthi Seshadri, representing Actress come Political leader Jayalalithaa.	Bilingual: simultaneously shot in Tamil & English	MX Player	Biography Web series
2026	Second Love	Host	Tamil	Hotstar	Hotstar Specials Reality Show Viewers can stream the drama and interactions 24x7 on the JioHotstar Platform.
TBA	Paakashala Pantham	TBA	Telugu	ETV Win	Direct OTT Release Movie
TBA	Queen season 2	A fictional character named Sakthi Seshadri, representing Actress come Political leader Jayalalithaa.	Bilingual: simultaneously shot in Tamil & English	MX Player	Biography Web series

== Television ==
=== TV series ===
List of television series credits
Year	Title	Role	Language	Channel	Notes
2008–2009	Kalasam	Ranjani and Neelambari	Tamil	Sun TV	Also Co-Producer
2009–2013	Thangam	Ganga Devi	Tamil	Sun TV	Also Co-Producer
2012–2013	Ala Modalaindi	Radha	Telugu	Gemini TV	Also Co-Producer
2013	Rajakumari	Neelambari	Tamil	Sun TV	Also Co-Producer
2013–2017	Vamsam	Shakthi and Archana	Tamil	Sun TV	Also Co-Producer
2019	Queen	Shakthi Seshadri	Tamil; English	MX Player	
2020	Naga Bhairavi	Mahasadvi	Telugu	Zee Telugu	For promotion, Title video song and Photograph appearance
2023	Nala Damayanthi	Amman	Tamil	Zee Tamil	For promotion
2023	Sandhya Raagam	Herself	Tamil	Zee Tamil	For promotion

=== Shows ===
List of television shows credits
Year	Title	Role	Language	Channel	Notes
2006	Jodi Number One	Judge	Tamil	Vijay TV	
2005–2007	Thanga Vettai	Host	Tamil	Sun TV	Replaced by Urvashi
2005–2007	Bangaram Mee Kosam	Host	Telugu	Gemini TV	Replaced Radhika Sarathkumar
2007	Jara masti Jara dhoom	Host / Producer	Telugu	Gemini TV	Also Producer
2010	Dhee S4	Guest Judge	ETV		
2012	Kaiyil Oru Kodi	Participant	Tamil	Sun TV	
2019	Bigg Boss S3	Guest Host	Telugu	Star Maa	Replacement Host of Nagarjuna on week 6
2020	Kodeeswari	Participant	Tamil	Colors Tamil	
2020	Cooku with Comali	Guest Judge	Tamil	Star Vijay	
2020	Dance vs Dance	Judge	Tamil	Colors Tamil	
2020	Sa Re Ga Ma Pa The Next Singing ICON	Guest	Telugu	Zee Telugu	Episodes 4 and 5
2021	BB Jodigal	Judge	Tamil	Star Vijay	
2021	Bigg Boss 5 Tamil	Guest Host	Tamil	Star Vijay	Replacement Host of Kamal Haasan on week 8
2022	BB Jodigal 2	Judge	Tamil	Star Vijay	
2022	Dance Ikon	Judge	Telugu	Gemini TV	
2026	Second Love	Host	Tamil	Vijay TV	
2026	Bigg Boss 10 Tamil	Guest Host	Tamil	Vijay TV	Replacement Host of Vijay Sethupathi on week 7

== Commercial advertisements and brand endorsements ==
In addition to her work in films and television, Ramya Krishnan has appeared in commercial advertisements and endorsed various brands during her career. She has also served as a brand ambassador for selected companies and products, appearing in television commercials and other promotional campaigns. Her advertising and endorsement work has included brands from different sectors, extending her professional presence beyond the film and television industries.

List of Advertisements
Year	Brand	Role	Language
1984	Britannia biscuit	Artist	Tamil
1999	Sundari silks	Artist	Tamil
2000 - 2002	Hayagrivas Silk House	Brand ambassador	Tamil
2000 - 2003	Franch Oil	Brand ambassador	Tamil
2001	vummidi bangaru jewellers	Brand ambassador	Tamil
2006	All out mosquito repellent	Brand ambassador	Tamil
2007	Fortune SunLite sunflower oil	Brand ambassador	Tamil
2007 - 2008	vim liquid	Brand ambassador	Tamil
2011	Cinthol soap	Brand ambassador	Tamil
2011	Sunflower soap	Brand ambassador	Telugu
2011	Nandhini milk	Brand ambassador	Telugu
2011	Sri Vaasavi Thanga Maaligai	Brand ambassador	Tamil
2012 - 2014	Mahaveers silks	Brand ambassador	Tamil
2014	Sifco Pharma Memory gold	Brand ambassador	Telugu
2015	Lohitha Oil	Brand ambassador	Telugu
2015	Lohitha Rice	Brand ambassador	Telugu
2015 - 2017	Kurkure	Brand ambassador	Multilanguage
2015	Prajay Megapolis	Brand ambassador	Telugu
2016	Ajeet seeds	Queen sivagami devi	Multilanguage
2016 - 2017	Chennai shopping mall	Brand ambassador	Telugu
2017 - 2018	Pothys	Queen	Multilanguage
2017 - 2026	Pankajakasthuri	Brand ambassador	Tamil
2017 - 2018	Manju Groups	Brand ambassador	Multilanguage
2021	NuShakti Powermix	Brand ambassador	Multilanguage
2021 - 2026	Golden Bansi	Brand ambassador	Telugu
2022 - 2026	Max Gold	Brand ambassador	Tamil
2022	HSW Embroidery Machines and Threads	Brand ambassador	Telugu
2023 - 2026	Gopuram Turmeric Powder	Brand ambassador	Tamil
2023 - 2026	Wipro Softouch Fabric Conditioner	Brand ambassador	Multilanguage
2024	CASAGRAND MASSIMO	Brand ambassador	Tamil
2025 - 2026	CavinKare Bacto-V	Brand ambassador	Multilanguage
2025 - 2026	Kenstar Appliances	Brand ambassador	Multilanguage
2025	Fortune Lake Wealth plots	Brand ambassador	Tamil
2026 - 2026	Wipro Giffy Dish Wash Gel	Queen sivagami devi	Multilanguage
2026	Sri kumaran Thangamaligai	Brand ambassador	Tamil
