= Seema G. Nair =

Indian actress

- Born: Mundakayam, Kerala, India
- Occupation: Actress
- Years active: 1984–present

Seema G. Nair is an Indian actress who appears in Malayalam and Tamil films and TV series.

== Personal life ==
Seema enjoys listening to Ghazal songs, cooking, traveling and cherishing 'me time'. Her favorite color is black, with her wardrobe predominantly featuring black, red, and white. She particularly favors the traditional Kerala dress.

== Career ==
Seema is the Vice President of ATMA (Association of Television Media Artistes). She is a member of Make-A-Wish Foundation, for Kerala division, a charity Organization based in India. Both Nair and her mother Cherthala Sumathi won the Kerala State Amateur Drama Award.

== Awards ==
- 2021 - Mother Teresa Award
- 2019 - Asianet Television Award for Best Character actress: Vanambadi
- 1992 Kerala State Amateur Drama Awards

== Partial filmography ==
Year	Title	Role	Notes
1984	Paavam Krooran	Murdered lady	
1984	Parannu Parannu Parannu	College student	
1984	Aduthaduthu	Kumudham	
1986	Neram Pularumbol	Nun	
2000	Thottam	-	
2000	Man Kolangal		
2000	Mazha	Doctor	
2001	The Gift of God		
2002	Bheri		
2003	Chronic Bachelor	Kunjulakshmi	
2004	Kanninum Kannadikkum	Pushkaran's wife	
2004	Kaazhcha	-	Short film
2005	Rappakal	Gauri's sister	
2005	Nerariyan CBI	Thulasi	
2006	Mahasamudram	Devi's sister	
2006	Karutha Pakshikal	Pankajam	
2006	Vaasthavam	Shobha	
2006	Pakal	Panchayat President	
2007	Changathipoocha	Jaanu	
2007	Thakarachenda	Vasanthi	
2008	Oru Pennum Randaanum	Neelantan's wife	
2008	Aandavan	Sarasu	
2008	Swarnam	Suicided man's mother	
2009	Swantham Lekhakan	Kamalakshi	
2009	Malayali	Madhavan's sister	
2009	Puthiya Mukham	Sudhi's kin	
2010	Vazhiyariyathe	Savithri	Short film
2010	Oridathoru Postman	Chandrappan's wife	
2010	Pulliman	Amina	
2010	Body Guard	Meenu teacher	
2010	Elsamma Enna Aankutty	Omana	
2011	Kayam	Muthu's mother	
2011	Bombay March 12	Police officer	
2011	Sarkar Colony	Colony resident	
2011	Maharaja Talkies	Aida	
2011	Koratty Pattanam Railway Gate	Sebatti'smother	
2012	Vaadhyar	School teacher	
2012	Veendum Kannur	-	
2012	Asuravithu	Boat conductress	
2012	Perinoru Makan	Remani	
2012	No. 66 Madhura Bus	Sumithra	
2012	Red Alert	-	
2012	Friday	-	
2012	Pratheekshayode	Anjali Ravikumar	
2013	Black Butterfly	Mary	
2013	Pullipulikalum Aattinkuttiyum	Vimala	
2013	Ayaal	Kochellu	
2013	Annum Innum Ennum	Clara	
2013	Weeping Boy	Ammu	
2013	For Sale	Lola	
2013	Memories	Valsamma	
2013	Mizhi	Savithri	
2014	Flat No. 4B	Mallika	
2014	1983	Rameshan's mother	
2014	Happy Journey	Liza	
2014	Solar Swapnam	-	
2014	Thomson Villa	Malathy Menon	
2014	Moksham	Rajappan's wife	Short film
2014	Tharangal	Sujatha	
2014	69 Oru Thala Thirinja Katha	-	Short film
2014	Bhaiyya Bhaiyya	Jameela	
2014	Iniyum Ethra Dooram	Doctor	
2014	Apothecary	Clara	
2014	The Dolphins		
2015	Perariyathavar	Chami's wife	
2015	Mashithandu	Janaki	
2015	Mariyam Mukku	Marykutty	
2015	Mayapuri 3D	Umma	
2015	Sarathi	Lathika	
2015	Jamna Pyari	Tony's mother	
2015	Vishwasam... Athallae Ellaam	Leelamma	
2015	Just Married	Vimala	
2015	Kunjiramayanam	Sumathi	
2015	Snehamaapinikal Undaayirunnenkil	-	Short film
2015	Kunjipennu	-	Album
2015	Pickles	Abhi'smother	
2015	ATM	Remani	
2015	Aana Mayil Ottakam	Prakashan's mother	
2016	Mezhukuthiri	—N/a	Voice only Short film
2016	Thaye Bhagavathi	-	Album
2016	Janmandharangal	-	Short film
2016	Ee Yathrayil	Vinod's mother	Short film
2016	Angane Thanne Nethave Anjettanam Pinnale		
2016	Hello Namasthe	Mohanan's wife	
2016	Valleem Thetti Pulleem Thetti	Vinayan'smother	
2016	Oru Murai Vanthu Parthaya	Aswathy's mother	
2016	168 Hours	Treesa's mother	
2016	Swarna Kaduva	Binoy's mother	
2016	Kattappanayile Hrithik Roshan	Kani's mother	
2016	Paulettante Veedu	Paul's wife	
2016	Irandu Manam Vendum	-	Tamil movie
2017	Paathi	Radha	
2017	Bairavaa	Vaishali'smother	Tamil film
2017	Fukri	Gauthami	
2017	Alamara	Sukumari	
2017	Sakhavu	Janaki's mother	
2017	Aakashamittayi	Aparna's mother	
2017	6 Viralukal	-	
2017	Sadrishyavakyam 24:29	Radha	
2017	Crossroad	Mariyamma	
2018	Thira Pole	-	
2018	Dear Mom	-	Short film
2018	Vikadakumaran	Binu's mother	
2018	Panchavarnathatha	Deepa Udayan	
2018	Street Lights	Subin's mother	
2018	Oru Kuttanadan Blog	GP's wife	
2018	Aikkarakoanathe Beeshgwaranmar	Madhavi	
2018	Karinkannan	Dasan's mother	
2018	Thattumpurath Achuthan	Rajan's wife	
2018	Ladoo	S.K.'s Mother	
2019	Mathrujam	Revathy	Short film
2019	Thirumanam	Vadivambal	Tamil film
2019	Vallikettu	Karthu	
2019	1948 Kaalam Paranjathu		
2019	Oru Yamandan Premakadha	Vicky's mom	
2019	Nan Petta Makan	Manohari	
2019	Mafi Dona	Sheeba	
2019	Thankabhasmakuriyittu Thampuratti	Manu's mother	
2019	March Randam Vyazham	Kayal Devi	
2019	Puthusseri Kavilamma	Nanu Nair's wife	
2020	Sufiyum Sujatayum	—N/a	Dubbed for Kalarenjini; Character : Kamala
2020	Vatsalyam	Amma	Music video
2021	Sneha Seema	Amma	Music video Singer also
2021	Enpathukalile Epyanmar	Fathima	
2021	Masaladasa	Prostitute	Short film
2021	Minutes	Mary	Short film
2021	Keshu Ee Veedinte Nadhan	Keshu's sister	
2022	Moori	-	
2022	Ulkkazhcha	-	
2022	Vaamanan		
2023	Vanitha	Sridevi	
2023	Uppumaavu		
2023	Within Seconds	Leelaamma	
2023	Bumper	Ismail's wife	Tamil film
2023	Padmini	Santha	
2023	Corona Dhavan	Sumithra	
2023	Somante Krithavu	Soman's mother	
2024	LLB: Life Line of Bachelors	Sarojini	
2025	Detective Ujjwalan	Leela	
2025	Page		
2026	Christina		
2026	Achyutha Avatharam		

== Television ==
=== Television serials (Partial) ===
Year	Title	Language	Channel	Role	Notes
2004	Minnukettu	Malayalam	Surya TV		
2011	Akashadoothu	Malayalam	Surya TV	Jessy	
2017	Vanambadi (TV series)	Malayalam	Asianet	Bhadra / Kalyani	
2017-2020	Mouna Raagam	Tamil	Star Vijay	Swarna Pazhaniswamy	
2020	Uyire	Tamil	Colors Tamil	Veeralakshmi	Replaced Sona Nair
2021-2024	Sundari	Malayalam	Surya TV	Mallika	
2021	Ente Bharya	Malayalam	Flowers TV		
2022-2023	Mouna Raagam 2	Tamil	Star Vijay	Swarna Pazhaniswamy	
2024-2025	Panivizhum Malarvanam	Tamil	Star Vijay	Raja Rajeshwari	
2024-2026	Snehakkoottu	Malayalam	Asianet	Shobha	
2025-present	Chattambipaaru	Malayalam	Surya TV	Devaki	
2026-present	Thai Maaman	Tamil	Star Vijay	Meenatchi	

=== TV shows ===
- Onnum Onnum Moonu - Participant
