= Killadi Jodis =

- Genre: Stunt/dare game show
- Based on: Mr & Mrs Khiladis
- Presented by: Sanjeev Venkat; Manimegalai
- Country of origin: India
- Original language: Tamil
- No. of episodes: 14

Production
- Camera setup: Multi-camera
- Running time: approx. 40-45 minutes per episode

Original release
- Network: Zee Tamil
- Release: 25 January – 26 April 2026

Related
- Mr & Mrs Khiladis

Killadi Jodis is a 2026 Indian Tamil-language celebrity stunt/dare-based reality television series based on the American series Fear Factor and is part of Mr & Mrs Khiladis. It premiered on Zee Tamil on 25 January 2026 and aired on every Sunday at 20:30 and streams digitally on ZEE5. The show is hosted by Sanjeev Venkat.

The finale was held on 26 June 2026. The show's five finalist jodis are Karana and Indhu, Sangavi and Raanav, Thangapandi and Chandhini, Hamaranath and Gayathiri, and Yogesh and Myna Nandhini. The show was won by Hamarnath and Gayathri, and received 15 lakhs, while Yogesh and Myna Nandhini were the runner-up of the show. Several guests that were included in the grand finale are Baba Bhaskar and Alya Manasa. The show also celebrates 30 years of host Sanjeev Venkat.

== Format ==
The show is about 8 real and reel celebrity couples from television, cinema, and social media to face high-pressure situations that challenge their trust, strength, resilience, love and teamwork.

== Contestants ==
#	Contestants	Episode entered	Episode exited	Ref
1	Krishnan and Aiswarya	1		
2	Ranaav and Sangavi	1	14	
3	Grunath and Daria	1		
4	Charly Joy and Priya Jerson	1		
5	Naresh and Swathika	1		
6	Hamarnath and Gayathri	1	14	
7	Thangapandi and Chandhini	1	14	
8	Yogesh and Myna Nandhini	1	14	

=== The list of contestants ===
- Krishnan and Aiswarya
  - A Real Couples and a social media influencer and YouTube blogger.
- Ranaav and Sangavi (Reel Couples)
  - Ranaav: A model and actor in the Tamil industry, who has appeared in Bigg Boss 8.
  - Sangavi: A television actress, recognized for Tamil serials like Chinna Marumagal and Veera.
- Grunath and Daria
  - A Lovers and a social media influencer and YouTube blogger.
- Charly Joy and Priya Jerson
  - A Real Couples and a social media influencer and YouTube blogger.
  - Priya Jerson: Singer
- Naresh and Swathika
  - Television actors, recognized for Tamil serials like Chinnanchiru Kiliye.
- Hamarnath and Gayathri
  - Hamarnath: A actor
- Thangapandi and Chandhini
  - Thangapandi: a social media influencer and YouTube blogger.
  - Chandhini : A television actress, recognized for Tamil serials like Pandian Stores 2.
- Yogesh and Myna Nandhini
  - A Real Couples and actor and actress, a social media influencer and YouTube blogger.

== Episodes ==
Epi	Airing	Round	shot	Ref
1	25 January 2026	Grand Lunch	Tamil Nadu	
2	1 February 2026	Sky and sea	Sri Lanka	
3	8 February 2026		Sri Lanka	
4	15 February 2026		Sri Lanka	
5	21 February 2026		Sri Lanka	
6	1 March 2026		Sri Lanka	

== Production ==
=== Development ===
It is an adaptation of Mr & Mrs Khiladis and was launched on 28 May 2016 . After the Single Pasanga show ended, Killadi Jodis began on 25 January 2026 as scheduled. On 5 January 2026, a first teaser was released on Zee Tamil's social media platforms.

The show host by actor Sanjeev Venkat, who returns to the small screen after an eight-year hiatus. This season was filmed and shot across spectacular international locations including Sri Lanka, Vietnam, Thailand, and the Maldives. On 22 February, the anchor Manimegalai was cast as special anchor for episode 5.

=== Release ===
The first promo was unveiled on 15 January, featuring host Sanjeev Venkat with the slogan "Ingai Sirantha Jodi Endru Nirupikka Kaalam Devai Illai Kalam Than Devai". The second promo was unveiled on 17 January, featuring contestants and a release date.
