= Maharaja Talkies =

- Directed by: Devidas Chelanat
- Written by: Saji Damodar
- Produced by: S Mohan
- Starring: Mukesh; Urvashi
- Cinematography: K P Suresh
- Edited by: Saji Damodar
- Distributed by: Dhanush Productions
- Release date: 13 May 2011
- Country: India
- Language: Malayalam

Maharaja Talkies is a 2011 Malayalam film, directed by debutante Devidas Chelanatt, starring Mukesh and Urvashi in the lead roles.

== Plot ==
Maharaja Talkies is about Vimala and her three sisters Ganga, Yamuna and Unnimaya. They run a film theatre that has been bestowed on them by their mother, before she died. Vimala has been more than a father and mother to the younger kids, since their father Raghavan Nair had deserted them when they were quite young. Pappachan who plays the local moneybag, is hell bent on bringing Maharaja Talkies down. He does it by hiring a cabaret dancer, and the people in no time desert the cinema hall and flock around the voluptuous performer. He also seeks the services of a Panchayath president who has been spurned by the 'theatre sisters' and who was asked to buy a few tickets for his family rather that having them for free. Then Venugopal, Vimala's childhood friend, comes to the village as Panchayath secretary. He then helps Vimala save the talkies.

== Cast ==
- Mukesh as Venugopal
- Urvashi as Vimala
- Vijayaraghavan as Moorkhanpparampil Pappachan
- Harishree Ashokan as Bharathan
- Ramesh Pisharody
- Narayanankutty as Thomas
- Kalabhavan Haneef as Dubai Abdullah
- Jaffar Idukki as Swaminathan
- Kochu Preman as Kamalahasan
- Babu Namboothiri as Raghavan Nair
- Rakhi Devi
- Unnimaya
- Seema G. Nair as Aida
- Deepika Mohan
- Sukumari as Vimala's aunt
- Haridas T B.
- Manu Mohith
