= Swapnam Kondu Thulabharam =

2003 film by Rajasenan

- Directed by: Rajasenan
- Written by: Reghunath Paleri
- Produced by: Khader Hassan
- Starring: Suresh Gopi; Kunchacko Boban; Shrutika; Nandana
- Cinematography: Ramachandra Babu
- Edited by: Raja Mohammad
- Music by: Ouseppachan
- Release date: 27 June 2003
- Country: India
- Language: Malayalam

Swapnam Kondu Thulabharam is a 2003 Indian Malayalam-language comedy film directed by Rajasenan. It stars Suresh Gopi and Kunchacko Boban. It was released on 27 June 2003.

== Plot ==
Madhavan Thampi and Prabhavati are middle-aged, well-off parents of two sons. Their elder son, Vishnu is athletic, studious and brilliant in academics. He recently joined a college as a lecturer after topping his exams. He manages several of his family's businesses and is often said to have the hands of Midas. The younger son, Aniyankuttan, meanwhile, is ten years younger and is the lead actor in the drama Cleopatra at his college. The girl playing Cleopatra - Kalyani - is in love with Aniyankuttan, although her love is unrequited.

Ammu is the drama queen and eye candy to the boys, although she has been crushing on Vishnu. Sivankutti is Vishnu's uncle and runs a match-making service, in search of a maiden for Vishnu. Ammu is advised by her roommates to befriend Aniyankuttan, to gain the trust and love of his family members, before she could propose to Vishnu. But Aniyankuttan mistakes her interest in him for romantic advances and tells his brother about his secret lover from college. Vishnu talks to his college mates only to mistake the lover for Kalyani. Vishnu gives his word to Kalyani, to support her love for Aniyankuttan, who was jealous of Ammu's intimacy with him. Ammu and Kalyani become friends after they confide in each other. Aniyankuttan is belittled and laughed at after their family's timber mill burns down. His horoscope is said to be cursed. A heavy-hearted Aniyankuttan goes to drink away his grief.

Vishnu and his mother convince Madhavan to buy a new bike for Aniyankuttan. He is delighted to have a bike and forces Ammu to ride it with him through the college verandah, much to her and Kalyani's discomfort. That night Aniyankuttan notices a new car bought for Vishnu, whilst his pleas for a car go unfulfilled. This enrages him, and is worsened when his mother serves Vishnu payasam in a crystal glass, while Aniyankuttan gets a common cup. He doesn't drink it and instead goes to the hostel. There his friends make fun of him and question his parentage. Later Aniyankuttan asks his mother if he was their son. Madhavan the next day goes to meet someone. Aniyankuttan follows him and sees an old man in a mental hospital who asks how is his son. Aniyankuttan thinks he is the old man's son and in desperation tries to kill Vishnu by placing drops of oil on the stairs. However, his mother slips on the oil, falls, and is taken to hospital, where Aniyankuttan tries to poison Vishnu but again fails. Vishnu feels suspicious of Aniyankuttan and pulls him aside to a quiet place where Aniyankuttan gets angry and tells Vishnu that he is not his brother and runs away to hide his grief. Vishnu then returns home and asks his father who is the old man he used to visit. Madhavan tells him that he is Aniyankuttan's father and was his best friend who helped him build his wealth.

Back at the hostel, Aniyankuttan again plans how to get rid of Vishnu. His friends suggest they will kill Vishnu by placing a bomb in Vishnu's car. Aniyankuttan returns home and tells his mother that Vishnu is about to be killed. To his amazement, Prabhavati confesses that Vishnu is not her son, but that he, Aniyankuttan, is. As punishment for planning to murder Vishnu, Aniyankuttan is thrown out of his home. Ridden with guilt Aniyankuttan goes in search of Vishnu and witnesses the car exploding in a ball of fire and cries in despair for the loss of his brother and once best friend. Meanwhile, Vishnu was saved from certain death. Aniyankuttan, discovering Vishnu is still alive runs and hugs Vishnu. Vishnu says that it doesn't matter who Aniyankuttan is born to. Aniyankuttan is about to tell Vishnu that Vishnu was born to other parents, but is stopped by his mother.

Finally, all the conflicts are resolved with Vishnu marrying Ammu and Aniyankuttan marrying Kalyani.

== Cast ==
- Suresh Gopi as Vishnu, the main Protagonist
- Kunchacko Boban as Aniyankuttan, the second protagonist
- Shrutika as Ammu
- Nandana as Kalyani
- Janardhanan as Madhavan Thampi, Aniyankuttan's father
- Srividya as Prabhavathi, Aniyankuttan's mother
- Jagathi Sreekumar as Sivan Kutti, Brocker
- Bindu Panicker as Hostel Matron
- Mithun Ramesh as Aniyankuttan's friend
- Kalamandalam Kesavan as Vishnu's real father
- Dhanya Mary Varghese as Dancer

== Soundtrack ==
The film's soundtrack contains 8 songs, all composed by Ouseppachan and Sanjeev Lal. Lyrics were by S. Ramesan Nair and Gireesh Puthenchery.

#	Title	Singer(s)
1	"Kasthoorikkuri Thottu" (M)	K. J. Yesudas
2	"Kasthoorikkuri Thottu" (F)	Jyotsna Radhakrishnan
3	"Kinginippoove Kanmaniprave"	M. G. Sreekumar, Sujatha Mohan
4	"Thottu Vilichaalo"	M. G. Sreekumar, Sujatha Mohan
5	"Kaathoram"	Rajasenan
6	"Ormakale"	K. K. Nishad
7	"Parannu Vannoru"	Santhosh Keshav, Vidhu Prathap
8	"Vaarmegha"	Ouseppachan
