= Rudra (actress) =

Indian actress

- Born: Ashwini Nambiar
- Other name: R. V. Aswini
- Occupations: Actress, dancer

Rudra, also credited as Ashwini, or Ashwini Nambiar is an Indian actress who has appeared in Malayalam, Telugu, and Tamil films and serials. She made her acting debut with the 1991 Tamil film Pudhu Nellu Pudhu Naathu. Her roles in Kauravar (1992), Manichitrathazhu (1993), Kizhakku Cheemayile (1993), Dhruvam (1993), Pidakkozhi Koovunna Noottaandu (1994) and Kudumbakodathi (1996) are well noted.

== Early life ==
When Ashwini was in her final year of school, she did a couple of modelling assignments with her classmates, for a Malayalam magazine. Director Bharathiraja saw the magazine and offered her the role in Pudhu Nellu Pudhu Naathu. Post marriage she moved to Singapore and is currently acting in Singapore serial and short films.

== Career ==
Rudra made her debut in the Tamil film Pudhu Nellu Pudhu Naathu, directed by Bharathiraja. She had done about 16 films in Malayalam, with her best known role as Alli in the classic Manichitrathazhu (1993), in which she was featured alongside Mohanlal, Shobana and Suresh Gopi. She has acted as Chiranjeevi's sister in Hitler (1997).

== Filmography ==
Year	Film	Role	Language	Notes
1991	Pudhu Nellu Pudhu Naathu	Marikozhundhu	Tamil	Debut film
1991	Post Box No. 27	Viji	Malayalam	
1992	Thoorathu Sontham	Dhanalakshmi	Tamil	
1992	Aayushkalam	Sujatha	Malayalam	
1992	Kauravar	Sridevi	Malayalam	
1993	Manichitrathazhu	Alli	Malayalam	
1993	Kizhakku Cheemayile	Pechi	Tamil	
1993	Butterflies	Maya Das	Malayalam	
1993	Dhruvam	Maya	Malayalam	
1993	Pidakkozhi Koovunna Noottaandu	Vasundhara	Malayalam	
1994	Pavithram	Reetha	Malayalam	
1994	Pudhupatti Ponnuthaayi	Rukku	Tamil	
1994	Muthal Payanam	Radha	Tamil	
1995	Sasinas	Sunandha/Dingadi Dingoos	Malayalam	
1995	Aunty	Kani	Telugu	
1996	Malayala Maasam Chingam Onninu	Renu	Malayalam	
1996	Kudumbakodathi	Pournami Nair	Malayalam	
1997	Raman Abdullah	Ayisha	Tamil	
1997	Periya Thambi	Meena	Tamil	
1997	Hitler	Sarada	Telugu	
1997	Pelli Chesukundam	Radhika	Telugu	
1997	Nazarr	Pinky	Hindi	
1999	Kallazhagar	Saira	Tamil	
1999	Police	Sujatha	Telugu	
2000	Ennavalle	Seetha	Tamil	
2007	Oram Po	Bigil's wife	Tamil	
2021	Ezhuthalar Alamelu Mangai	Alamelu Mangai	Tamil	Short film
2021	Angel Colony	Shantha Rai	Tamil	Short film
2025	Suzhal: The Vortex	Malathi	Tamil	Web Series

== TV serials ==
Tamil

Year	Serial	Role	Channel
	Chellam	Director	
	Chandrikaiyin Kathai	Muthamma	Telefilm
	Dreams		
1996	Chinna Chinna Aasai : Nirangal	Kanchana	Sun TV
1996	Sangamam		TV 12
1996	Chinna Chinna Aasai : Bommaikal	Jayanthi	Sun TV
2001	Take it Easy Vazhkai	Durga	Sun TV
2001	Nimmathi Ungal Choice	Nirmala	Sun TV
2002	Meera	Meera	Doordarshan
2003-2006	Kettimelam	Lakshmi	Jaya TV
2006	Raja Rajeswari	Maheswari	Sun TV
2014	Ninaivugal		MediaCorp Vasantham
2017	Athiyaayam	Nandini	Vasanatham TV
2017	Masala	Visalatchi	Vasanatham TV
2017	Mudhal Vanakkam	Maya	Vasanatham TV
2019–2020	Magarasi	Gomathi	Sun TV
2019	Darbaar		Vasanatham TV
2019	Moondraavathu Kann		Vasanatham TV
2019	128 Circle	Rani	Mediacorp Channel 5
2020	Uyire	Charu	Zee Tamil
2020	Lingam Stores		Vasanatham TV
2020	Pugaipadam	Malarvizhi	Vasanatham TV
2020	Kaalam	Ganga	Vasanatham TV
2020	Swaasamey	Counselor	Vasanatham TV
2021	Naam		Vasanatham TV
2021	Enakkaga	Malar	Vasanatham TV
2021	Irandu	Dr. Vasundhara	Vasanatham TV
2021	Manmadhan Anbu	Roopa	Vasanatham TV
2021	Mugavari	Banumathi	Vasanatham TV
2021	Pattaasu Productions	Harini	Vasanatham TV
2022	Mars Poyi Sernthuttom		Vasanatham TV
2022	Vasantham Muthal Paarvai : Veezhvaen Yendru Ninaithaay	Raji Subash	Vasanatham TV
2022	128 Circle Season 2	Rani	Vasanatham TV
2022	Maiyam	Gayathri	Vasanatham TV
2022	Kattradhu Kadhal	Hannah	Vasanatham TV
2022 - 2023	Aathmaan	Shailaja	Mediacorp
2023	Vinaivazhi	Vennila	Vasantham
2024	Pithamagan	Radha	Vasantham
2024	128 Circle Season 3	Rani	Vasantham
2024	Muthal Vanakkam(telefilm)	Teacher	Vasantham
2025	Sandamaarutham	Esaki	Mediacorp
2026	Manam	Leela	Astro Vinmeen

Malayalam

Year	Serial	Role	Channel
2005	Kadamattathu Kathanar	Mythili	Asianet

Telugu

Year	Serial	Role	Channel
	Ammakaniko Ammayi		
	Antharnethram		
	Kalankitha	Dual role Kala	
	Tholi Rojulu		
1998	Antharangaalu	Padmini	ETV
2001	Akka Chellalu		ETV
