= Shrutika Arjun =

Indian television personality

- Born: 17 September 1987 (age 39); Tamil Nadu, India
- Occupations: Television personality, entrepreneur, actress
- Years active: 2002–2003, 2022–present
- Spouse: Arjun Raaj
- Children: 1

Shrutika Arjun (born 17 September 1987) is an Indian television personality, entrepreneur and former actress who appeared in Tamil and Malayalam films. She debuted as an actress in 2002. After two years of acting, she quit the entertainment industry, but returned in 2022 with the third season of the reality series Cooku with Comali 3, in which she emerged the winner. In 2024, she participated in the 18th season of the Hindi reality series Bigg Boss.

== Early and personal life ==
Shrutika was born on 17 September 1987. Her paternal grandfather is actor Thengai Srinivasan. She studied in Adarsh Vidyalaya Higher Secondary School, Chennai. Her cousin Yogi and brother Adithya are actors. Shrutika's father is Tamil and her mother is Punjabi. Shrutika is married to businessman Arjun, and they have a son. In 2018, she founded an Ayurvedic skin brand named Haappy Herbs.

== Career ==
At age 14, Shrutika was picked to star in Sri (2002) opposite Suriya. A critic from The Hindu noted that the two make a "nice screen pair". Her role as Ammu in the Malayalam film Swapnam Kondu Thulabharam was praised by reviewers. Shrutika also appeared in supporting roles in the 2003 Tamil films Nala Damayanthi and Thithikudhe, starring Madhavan and Jiiva respectively. She then left the film industry to focus on her education, but said in 2020 that she was open to returning. Shrutika returned to entertainment in 2022 with the third season of the reality series Cooku with Comali, of which she emerged the winner. In 2024, she became the first Tamil contestant on the Hindi reality series Big Boss, participating in its 18th season, and was evicted on Day 96. In 2026, she appeared on The 50, which aired on JioHotstar.

== Filmography ==
=== Films ===
Year	Title	Role	Language
2002	Sri	Meenakshi	Tamil
2002	Album	Vijaya "Viji" Lakshmi	Tamil
2003	Nala Damayanthi	Malathy	Tamil
2003	Swapnam Kondu Thulabharam	Ammu	Malayalam
2003	Thithikudhe	Sruthi	Tamil

=== Television ===
Year	Title	Role	Language	Notes
2022	Cooku with Comali season 3	Contestant	Tamil	Winner
2022	Mr. and Mrs. Chinnathirai	Guest host	Tamil	Season 4
2022	Anda Ka Kasam	Contestant	Tamil	
2022	Oo Solriya Oo Oohm Solriya	Contestant	Tamil	
2023	Kalakka Povathu Yaaru? Champions Season 4	Judge	Tamil	
2024–2025	Bigg Boss 18	Contestant	Hindi	
2025	Single Pasanga	Judge	Tamil	
2026	The 50	Contestant	Hindi	
2026	Second Love	Host	Tamil	
