= Thai Maaman (TV series) =

- Genre: Romance; Melodrama
- Based on: Kizhakku Cheemayile by Bharathiraja
- Written by: Dialogue: Chandru Dhuraiyappan
- Screenplay by: Chandru Dhuraiyappan
- Directed by: Manoj Kumar
- Starring: Ranjith; Devipriya; Raj Kapoor; Seema G. Nair; Sastik; Shiyara Shalini
- Theme music composer: Karaneeswararan
- Country of origin: India
- Original language: Tamil
- No. of seasons: 1

Production
- Producer: Jagan Baskaran
- Production location: Tamil Nadu
- Cinematography: M. Antony
- Editor: Vijay Krishnan Seenivasan
- Camera setup: Multi-Camera
- Running time: approx. 22–24 minutes per episode
- Production company: Box Office Studio

Original release
- Network: Star Vijay
- Release: 27 April 2026 – present

Thai Maaman or Thai Maaman - Thaikku Nigaranavan (transl. Maternal uncle) is a 2026 Indian Tamil-language Melodrama romantic television series that airs on Star Vijay starring Ranjith, Devipriya, Raj Kapoor, Seema G. Nair, Sastik and Shiyara Shalini . Directed by Manoj Kumar, written and Screenplay by Chandru Dhuraiyappan, the serial revolves around the journey of a touching sentimental story between a brother and a sister.

The show was produced by Jagan Baskaran under the Box Office Studio banner. It premiered on Star Vijay on 27 April 2026, and airs from Monday to Friday at 19:00 and streams digitally on JioHotstar.

== Plot ==
The series focuses on the relationship between Mayandi, a respected landlord in the village of Rasingapuram in Theni district of Tamil Nadu, and his younger sister Pechi, who is married to Manjamalai of the neighbouring village Nagalapuram.

Mayandi and Pechi have a strong bond and always look out for each other. While the two families were initially close, circumstances lead to a fight between Mayandi and Manjamalai during the ear piercing ceremony of Manjamalai and Pechi's third daughter Ilavarasi, leading to the death of Manjamalai's father at the hands of Sudalai, Manjamalai's wastrel and drunkard brother-in-law, who then puts the blame on Mayandi. This, along with Mayandi accidentally cutting off Manjamalai's hand during their fight, leads to Mayandi getting sentenced to fourteen years of imprisonment, shattering his family and beginning the life-long enmity between the two families, with Pechi, who is aware of her brother's innocence and refuses to condemn him, caught in between the feud. Mayandi's wife Meenatchi distances the family from Pechi's family and focuses on tending her husband's land while he is in prison, eventually becoming rich due to her hard work. On the other hand, Manjamalai becomes more influenced by Sudalai and, distraught due to losing his hand, becomes an unemployed drunkard and his family begins to face the hard times.

Ten years later, Mayandi is released from prison earlier than expected due to good conduct and returns home to witness the feud personally. The feud has extended to the next generation, with Mayandi and Meenatchi's son Azhagar and Manjamalai and Pechi's eldest daughter Poongodi (who were both close in their childhood) hating each other and blaming each other's fathers as the cause of their conflict and engage in practical jokes and verbal banter most of the time. Azhagar is in love with Nandhini, who is the daughter of Deivanai, Meenatchi's sister-in-law. The conflict takes a drastic turn during Poongodi's puberty ceremony, which is held later than usual due to her poor health when she is menstruating. Manjamalai, who reluctantly, on Sudalai's request, invites Mayandi and his family to the ceremony only to seize Mayandi's properties, becomes infuriated when Mayandi asks for Poongodi to marry Azhagar in exchange for the properties. Manjamalai insults Azhagar's parentage and challenges Mayandi and Azhagar that he would get Poongodi married to another person within a week. Poongodi's marriage is arranged with a middle-aged bar owner named Karungal Pandi. On the night before the wedding, Azhagar, to get back at Manjamalai for his cruel words on his parentage that shattered Meenatchi and vowing to stop the marriage at any cost, kidnaps Poongodi and keeps her safely in an abandoned cinema theatre until the Muhurtham (auspicious time for marriage) is over. Once he has won in his challenge i.e. ensuring that the wedding does not take place, he personally takes Poongodi back home. At this juncture, Poongodi and Manjamalai hatch a plan to humiliate Azhagar and his family due to the humiliation faced by Manjamalai on the marriage not taking place. As part of this plan, Poongodi forces Azhagar to marry her in front of the Rasingapuram panchayat and then enter his home to expose and humiliate Azhagar, Mayandi and their family members and show that they are not good people as they claim to be.

The rest of the story revolves on whether Poongodi and Manjamalai succeed in their mission, whether Poongodi and Azhagar accept each other despite the circumstances, whether the brother-sister bond of Mayandi and Pechi can continue to hold and whether the two families would ever reconcile.

== Cast ==
=== Main ===
- Ranjith as Mayandi; Meenakshi's husband, Pechi's brother and Azhagar and Thenmozhi’s father.
- Devipriya as Pechi; Manjamalai's wife, Mayandi's sister.
- Raj Kapoor as Manjamalai; Pechi's husband, Raasathi's brother.
- Seema G. Nair as Meenatchi; Mayandi's wife and Azhagar and Thenmozhi’s mother
- Sastik as Azhagar; Mayandi and Meenatchi's son, Thenmozhi’s brother, and Poongodi’s husband
- Shiyara Shalini as Poongodi; Manjamalai and Pechi's daughter, Senthamizh and Ilavarsi’s sister, and Azhagar’s wife

=== Supporting ===
- Sai Gopi as Sudalai: Raasathi’s husband and Manjamalai’s brother in law (Main Antagonist)
- Akila Krishanan as Raasathi: Manjamalai's sister and Sudalai's wife (Antagonist)
- Pasi Sathya as Kaaliamma: Manjamalai and Raasathi's mother (Antagonist)
- Unkown as Mandhaiyan (Mandhaiya): Kaaliamma’s husband and Manjamalai and Raasathi’s father (Dead) killed by Sudalai
- Preetha Suresh as Nandhini
- Mohana VJ as Thenmozhi: Mayandi and Meenatchi's daughter and Azhagar's younger sister
- Agasthiya as Senthamizh: Manjamalai and Pechi's second daughter, Poongodi and Ilavarasi's sister
- Bavani as Ilavarasi: Manjamalai and Pechi’s youngest daughter, and Poongodi and Senthamizh younger sister
- S.Jenuya as Pechi’s neighbor
- Ambani Shankar as Suruli: Azhagar’s friend
- Siva Sevugan as Suna Pana: Azhagar’s friend
- O.A.K Sundar as Karungal Pandi: Poongodi’s ex fiancée (Antagonist)

== Production ==
=== Development ===
Thai Maaman was produced by Jagan Baskaran under the banner of Box Office Studio, known for his series like Thendral Vandhu Ennai Thodum (2021-2023), Kaatrukkenna Veli (2021-2023) and Chellamma (2022-2024). The series is directed by Manoj Kumar, known for his series like Mouna Raagam (2017-2023) and Chinna Marumagal and written by Chandru Dhuraiyappan.

The concept of the show was originally based on Bharathiraja's 1993 film Kizhakku Cheemayile.

=== Casting ===
Tamil film actor, Ranjith was cast as Mayandi, marking his return after Bigg Boss 8. Actress Devipriya plays the role of Mayandi's sister Pechi. Raj Kapoor played the role of Pechi's husband, Seema G. Nair played the role of Mayandi's wife.

== Release ==
Star Vijay released the series' first promo on 5 April 2026 featuring all the main cast. The second and third promos were released on 13 April and 17 April 2026. On 22 April, revealing the upcoming release date.

The show debuted on Star Vijay on 27 April 2026 from Monday to Friday at 19:00, taking Sindhu Bairavi Kacheri Arambam 's time slot.
