= Pudhu Nellu Pudhu Naathu =

1991 film by Bharathiraja

- Poster
- Directed by: Bharathiraja
- Written by: Ponvannan (dialogues)
- Screenplay by: Bharathiraja
- Story by: R. Selvaraj
- Produced by: Ve. Vaduganathan; C. N. Jayakumar; M. Ilavarasu
- Starring: Rahul; Sukanya
- Cinematography: B. Kannan
- Edited by: P. Mohanraj
- Music by: Ilaiyaraaja
- Production company: Mookambigai Art Creations
- Release date: 15 March 1991
- Country: India
- Language: Tamil

Pudhu Nellu Pudhu Naathu (transl. New Rice Seedlings) is a 1991 Indian Tamil-language film directed by Bharathiraja. This film marked the debut for supporting artist Napoleon as well as leading actress, Sukanya. It was released on 15 March 1991.

== Plot ==
In Thaayamangalam village, Sankaralingam is an authoritarian village headman who exploits the villagers through usurious lending and fear. He treats them like slaves and rules with absolute control. Fifteen years earlier, a family—Veeraiya, his wife Thaayamma, and their two young sons, Kathirvel and Muthuvel—were driven out of the village after borrowing money from Sankaralingam. This persecution ultimately led to Veeraiya's death. Now, Thaayamma returns to Thaayamangalam with her grown-up son Kathirvel, determined to reclaim their house by repaying the debt. By this time, Sankaralingam's power has only increased, and the villagers still live in fear. A schoolteacher leases part of his land and house to Kathirvel, enabling him to farm and earn money to settle the debt. When the teacher questions Sankaralingam about misusing funds meant for school repairs, Sankaralingam retaliates by staging his murder as a suicide.

Although illiterate, Kathirvel is hardworking and begins earning profits from agriculture. Kathirvel's cousin Krishnaveni loves him and refuses all other proposals. However, Kathirvel focuses solely on reclaiming his house. When Krishnaveni persists, Kathirvel humiliates her, driving her to attempt suicide. He rescues her and takes her to a traditional healer, where he finally admits that he has feelings for her. Thaayamma gives Sankaralingam ₹15,000 (equivalent to ₹140,000 or US$1,500 in 2026), but he manipulates the accounts and demands another ₹15,000 as interest, declaring himself the owner of Kathirvel's house until the full amount is paid. Enraged, Kathirvel confronts Sankaralingam's accountant for falsifying records and demands the return of his house documents. Exploiting Kathirvel's threat as an opportunity, Sankaralingam chops off his accountant's hand and falsely accuses Kathirvel of the act. Kathirvel is arrested and imprisoned in Palayamkottai prison.

Soon, Kathirvel's younger brother Muthuvel returns to the village after completing his studies. Unaware of the enmity between his family and Sankaralingam, Muthuvel falls in love with Sankaralingam's daughter, Marikozhunthu. At Muthuvel's request, Krishnaveni helps treat Marikozhunthu's hip injury, during which Krishnaveni discovers the love affair between Muthuvel and Marikozhunthu. Kathirvel is released from prison and, furious over his wrongful incarceration, drives away Sankaralingam's cattle occupying his dilapidated house and vows to kill Sankaralingam. Kathirvel learns about Muthuvel's relationship with Marikozhunthu and beats him, but Muthuvel retaliates. Thaayamma intervenes and stops the fight.

Thaayamma then reveals the truth of the past. Veeraiya, a loyal laborer under Sankaralingam, brings his newlywed wife Thaayamma to Thaayamangalam, where Sankaralingam begins to lust after her. He made the couple stay in his backyard house, while Veeraiya remained unaware of his intentions. Encouraged by Thaayamma, the couple worked tirelessly, saved money, bought cattle, cultivated land, and eventually built their own house. Envious of Veeraiya's progress, Sankaralingam misbehaved with Thaayamma. When Veeraiya warned him to stay away from his wife, a humiliated Sankaralingam murdered Veeraiya in the river. He then took Veeraiya's thumbprint from his corpse on blank bond papers and used it to fabricate documents claiming the house had been pawned. Thaayamma witnessed this and, using those forged documents, Sankaralingam drove Veeraiya's family out of their home. Kathirvel and Muthuvel now realize that Sankaralingam not only destroyed their lives but also murdered their father.

Soon, Marikozhunthu becomes pregnant with Muthuvel's child. Kathirvel initially views this as an act of revenge, but Thaayamma rebukes her sons, reminding them that harming a woman is not justice. Kathirvel informs Sankaralingam that Marikozhunthu is pregnant, without revealing Muthuvel's identity. Marikozhunthu's mother, Sivakami, secretly meets Thaayamma and pleads for Muthuvel and Marikozhunthu's marriage. Sankaralingam learns the truth through Sivakami, and she urges him to accept the union. Pretending to have reformed, Sankaralingam takes Sivakami to a nearby temple at night and murders her, staging it as an accident. Feigning innocence, Sankaralingam begins arranging Marikozhunthu's marriage to another man. Under house arrest, Marikozhunthu seeks Krishnaveni's help to escape, which Sankaralingam overhears. Krishnaveni scolds Kathirvel and Muthuvel and pushes them to rescue Marikozhunthu before she is forcibly married.

Also, Sankaralingam plans to kill his own daughter to erase evidence of her pregnancy and protect his reputation. His accountant, now remorseful, overhears this plan and informs Thaayamma. Realizing the danger, Thaayamma, along with Kathirvel, Muthuvel, and Krishnaveni, rushes to the temple where Sankaralingam has taken Marikozhunthu— the same place where he killed Sivakami. As Sankaralingam raises his sickle to kill Marikozhunthu, Kathirvel attacks him. Sankaralingam tries to escape from the brothers, but Thaayamma fatally stabs him, avenging her husband's murder and his abuse. The film ends with the construction of a new school named after Sivakami and Thaayamma getting arrested for the killing, symbolizing the liberation of Thaayamangalam from Sankaralingam's tyranny.

== Cast ==
- Rahul as Kathirvel
- Sukanya as Krishnaveni
- Ram Arjun as Muthuvel
- Rudhra as Marikozhunthu
- Napoleon as Sankaralingam
- Ponvannan as Veeraiya
- Renuka as Thaayamma

== Production ==
Pudhu Nellu Pudhu Naathu is the debut film for Napoleon and Sukanya as actors; the former was then 27 years old, playing a character more than twice his age. Though director Bharathiraja often gave stage names to actors introduced in his films, he made an exception with Sukanya. The film also marked the acting debut of Ram Arjun, brother of actresses Radha and Ambika. Renuka joined the film as she expected it to be a career breakthrough. Arivumathi worked as an assistant director after a previous film he started, Ullen Ayya, was shelved.

== Soundtrack ==
The music was composed by Ilaiyaraaja. Portions of the song "Karutha Machan" were used in Master (2021) and Dude (2025).

Track listing
No.	Title	Lyrics	Singer(s)	Length
1.	"Bharani Bharani"	Ilaiyaraaja	Ilaiyaraaja	3:01
2.	"Chittan Chittan"	Gangai Amaran	S. Janaki, Mano	4:56
3.	"Karutha Machan"	Ilaiyaraaja	S. Janaki	4:43
4.	"Poo Poo Poo"	Gangai Amaran	S. P. Balasubrahmanyam, S. Janaki	4:43
5.	"Hey Marikozhundhu"	Muthulingam	Uma Ramanan, K. S. Chithra	5:06
6.	"Salangai Satham"	Ilaiyaraaja	Ilaiyaraaja	1:04
Total length:				23:33

== Reception ==
Sundarji of Kalki praised the performances of Sukanya and Napoleon, but felt casting young people in elderly roles gave a play like feel. He praised Bharathiraja's direction, scenes and making while also saying the plot had a lot of loopholes and flaws but everything gets overshadowed.

== Accolades ==
Sukanya won the Cinema Express Award for Best New Face Actress.
