= Rajakali Amman =

- DVD cover
- Directed by: Rama Narayanan
- Written by: Pugazhmani (dialogues)
- Story by: Rama Narayanan
- Produced by: Pushpa Kandaswamy
- Starring: Ramya Krishnan; Karan; Kausalya
- Cinematography: N. K. Viswanathan
- Edited by: Raajgeerthi
- Music by: S. A. Rajkumar
- Production company: Kavithalayaa Productions
- Distributed by: Aadhi Bhagavan Films
- Release date: 14 April 2000
- Running time: 119 minutes
- Country: India
- Language: Tamil

Rajakali Amman is a 2000 Indian Tamil-language devotional film written and directed by Rama Narayanan. It stars Ramya Krishnan as the goddess Amman alongside Karan and Kausalya.

== Plot ==
Goddess Rajakali Amman is the gramadevata of a local town. She decides to leave her original shrine when a local zamindar tries to steal the jewellery that is used to adorn her idol. She walks away until she reaches the next town and meets 2 orphaned siblings, Gopal and Meena. Meena gives her milk to drink while Gopal entertains her with music from his pungi, since he is a snake charmer. The goddess, touched by their empathy, promises to protect them and manifests herself into a stone idol. Many years later, the adult Meena and Gopal, live happily with their pet snake, Manickam, and continue pleasing, worshipping and conversing with Rajakali Amman. They all flourish because of the blessings of the goddess, who also returns to her original shrine, but these days will be over when Meena marries an evil man named Seemadorai, who fakes being nice and seduces Meena. Despite the goddess' disapproval, Meena marries Seemadurai. Seemadurai's relative Ramesh and her sister kill Gopal. Determined to save her devotee, Rajakali Amman enters Ramesh's house as a woman named Gayathri who returns from the USA. Meena learns about the fact of the goddess and Rajakali Amman finally tries to remove all the sufferings of Meena. While Meena is worshipping the goddess, Seemadurai tries to demolish the shrine until the goddess attacks him by stinging his eyes. Meena tries to save her husband from Rajakali Amman but her sindoor gets washed away in the rain. Rajakali Amman proceeds to kill Seemadurai until Manickam uses its own blood as sindoor. This stops Rajakali Amman from killing Seemadurai and the latter, now realises everything and begs for forgiveness while crying profusely. The goddess forgives and blesses him and Meena to live a long married life. Meena still continued to meet Rajakali Amman often.

== Cast ==
- Ramya Krishnan as Goddess Sri Raja Kaliamman/Gayathri
- Karan as Seemadurai alias Kannayiram
- Kausalya as Meena
- Jandaa (ghost) as Jandaa
- Nizhalgal Ravi as Guru
- Vadivelu as Gopal
- Y. Vijaya as Seemadorai's elder sister
- Charan Raj as an astrologer

== Soundtrack ==
Soundtrack was composed by S. A. Rajkumar.

Song	Singers	Lyrics
"Kalyanam Thevayillai"	Mano	Vairamuthu
"Puthukottai Bhuvaneswari"	K. S. Chithra	Kalidasan
"Santhana Malligaiyil" I	Vadivelu, Swarnalatha	Palani Bharathi
"Santhana Malligaiyil" II	S. A. Rajkumar, Swarnalatha	Palani Bharathi
"Thangachi En"	Krishnaraj	Kalaikumar
"Dhanam Tharum"	Chorus	Kalidasan
"Amman Dance"	Instrumental	

== Reception ==
The Hindu wrote "The story is old, the way the characters enact their roles is ancient, and melodrama is predominant, especially in Vadivelu's expressions." Malini Mannath of Chennai Online wrote, "This film with its snakes, good and evil, and the Goddess all seem to be in the director's favourite genre. Not a very intelligent audience in mind when he made this film! What is surprising is that such a film could come from the production house of a K. Balachander!". Lavanya of Deccan Herald wrote, "Like other Thyagaraja Bhagavathar movies, Raja Kaliamman is a melodramtic but lacks subtle narration".
