= Annai Kaligambal =

Annai Kaligambal/Shri Kalikamba
- Directed by: Rama Narayanan
- Written by: Gajendrakumar (dialogues)
- Produced by: N. Radha
- Starring: Ramya Krishnan; Livingston (Tamil); Vinod Alva (Kannada); Anu Prabhakar
- Cinematography: N. K. Viswanathan
- Edited by: Raajkeerthi
- Music by: Deva
- Production company: Sri Thenandal Films
- Release date: 15 January 2003
- Running time: 136 minutes
- Country: India
- Languages: Tamil; Kannada

Annai Kaligambal is a 2003 Indian devotional film written and directed by Rama Narayanan. The film featured Ramya Krishnan in the title role alongside Livingston and Anu Prabhakar, while Jayanthi plays a supporting role. The film, which had music composed by Deva, released in January 2003. The film was simultaneously shot in Tamil and Kannada, with the latter titled as Shri Kalikamba, with Vinod Alva and Tennis Krishna replacing Livingston and Vennira Aadai Moorthy, respectively. Kannada version was dubbed in Hindi as Maa Durga Divya Haathi and in Telugu as Allari Gajendrudu.

== Cast ==
| Actor (Tamil) | Actor (Kannada) | Role (Tamil) | Role (Kannada) |
|---|---|---|---|
| Ramya Krishnan | | Goddess Kaligambal | Shri Kalikamba |
| Ramya Krishnan | | Parvathi | Parvathi |
| Livingston | Vinod Alva | Madhu | Madhu |
| Anu Prabhakar | | Eshwari | Eshwari |
| Satya Prakash | | Mandiramoorthi | Mandiramoorthi |
| Vennira Aadai Moorthy | Tennis Krishna | Nachiyappan | Nachiyappe Gowda |
| Babloo Prithiveeraj | | in a special appearance | in a special appearance |
| Jayanthi | | Palaiyanur Neeli | Srirangapatna Ranganayaki |
| Jayanthi | | Pattamangalam Ranganayaki | Kollegalada Neela |
| Jyothi Lakshmi | | Aaravalli | Leela Rani |
| Bank Janardhan | | Roadside shop worker | Roadside shop worker |

== Soundtrack ==
Soundtrack was composed by Deva and lyrics were written by Kalidasan.

Tamil version

- "Omthana Namthana" - Anuradha Sriram
- "Sangu Pushpame" - Swarnalatha
- "Pachai Pachai" - Devie Neithiyar, Swarnalatha
- "Gane Gane" - Manikka Vinayagam
- "Rama Jayam" - Chorus
- "Amman Dance" - Instrumental

Kannada version

The lyrics were written by K. Kalyan.

- "Pacche Gili" - Naga Chandrika, Ramya
- "Suvaa Laali" - Swarnalatha
- "Gane Gane Ganesha" - Manu
- "Malli Malli" - Devi
- "Pacche Gili" - Naga Chandrika, Swarnalatha
- "Kapaadu" - Anuradha Sriram

== Reception ==
Chennai Online wrote "Rama Narayanan’ s films are becoming monotonous and stereotyped. You’ve seen one, you’ve seen them all. The only consolation for the film-maker is that, shot on a limited budge, and patronised by the rural and the suburban folk, the film manages to recover the cost. So, who are we to grudge him!". Viggy wrote "People from Telugu and Tamil film industry are always the leaders in making spiritual movies and so is the director of Sri Kalikamba - Ramnarayan. Has done a good job in extracting their best out of all actors even from animals like elephant, monkey etc".
