= Manam (TV series) =

- Genre: Melodrama; Romance
- Based on: Layang-Layang Perkahwinan
- Written by: Seelan Manoheran
- Screenplay by: Seelan Manoheran
- Directed by: SD Puvanendran
- Starring: Jayshree; Surrya Prakash; Subashini; Seelan Manoheran; Mathialagan; Ashwini Nambiar
- Theme music composer: Ztish
- Country of origin: Malaysia
- Original language: Tamil
- No. of seasons: 1
- No. of episodes: 34

Production
- Producer: Seelan Manoheran
- Editor: Muthu Raj; Nattu Raja
- Camera setup: Multi-camera
- Running time: approx.20-22 minutes per episode
- Production company: Moviegram Studio Sdn Bhd

Original release
- Network: Astro Vinmeen HD
- Release: 2 February – 30 March 2026

Related
- Layang-Layang Perkahwinan

Manam (transl. Mind) is a 2026 Malaysian Tamil-language Melodrama television series screenplay, written and produced by Seelan Manoheran, directed by SD Puvanendran, starring Jayshree, Surrya Prakash, Subashini, Seelan Manoheran, Mathialagan and Ashwini Nambiar in the lead roles. The show is an official remake of Astro Ria's Malay series Layang-Layang Perkahwinan.

It tells a story of a married couple whose unravels when betrayal, lies, and hidden crimes surface betrayal of one another leads to a whirlwind of revenge, grief, motherhood, survival, forgiveness and healing. It aired on Astro Vinmeen HD on Monday to Thursday at 21:30 (MST) from 2 February to 30 March 2026, and ended with 34 episodes, and is also available on the digital platforms Astro GO and Sooka.

== Plot ==
The story follows Sheena, who is the perfect wife to Varun, who supports her husband Varun’s ascent to top leadership within the company. While juggling her roles as a caring mother, loving wife and responsible daughter-in-law, Sheena keeps the household running seamlessly, even as she manages the pressures of her own career. However, Sheena doesn't realize that she has been cheated on by Varun.

Confronted by Varun’s infidelity, Sheena finds the courage to stand up for herself, even in the face of severe consequences from her influential in-law family. Sheena fights for her dignity, freedom and decides to divorce and meticulously plans her revenge.

== Cast ==
=== Main ===
- Jayshree as Sheena
- Surrya Prakash as Varun
- Subashini as Sumi
- Seelan Manoheran as Amar
- Mathialagan as Selvanayagam
- Ashwini Nambiar as Leela

=== Recurring ===
- Navin
- Vanishaa
- Anjana MoL
- Rani

== Production ==
=== Development ===
The show was screenplay, written and produced by Seelan Manoheran under Moviegram Studio Sdn Bhd. He plays the lead role of Amar in this series. The series was directed by SD Puvanendran, and the story-line is inspired by the Malay series Layang-Layang Perkahwinan. And also Astro’s second consecutive Malay to Tamil adaptation after Aadhira series.

=== Casting ===
Actor Surrya Prakash was cast as the male lead Varun, who cheats on his wife and for his notable performance in Dejavu 375, Yaar Avan and Iraivi Thirumagal Kaadu.

Actress Jayshree plays the lead role as Leena in the series. Subashini was played as Sumi, who is an aiffiar with Varun and trun to his second wife. Actor Seelan Manoheran, who produced and wrote the series, also plays the role of Amar, as Leena's well-wisher. Actor Mathialagan and Ashwini Nambiar portrayed Selvanayagam and Leela, the parents of Varun.
