= Bava Marudula Saval =

- Directed by: C. V. Ganesh
- Written by: Kaasi Viswanath (dialogues)
- Screenplay by: C. V. Ganesh
- Story by: C. Padmaja Naidu; Chitoori Venkata Ganesh
- Produced by: Polamarasetty Appa Rao
- Starring: Rajendra Prasad; Dr. Rajasekhar; Ramya Krishna
- Cinematography: C. Gopal
- Edited by: S. P. S. Veerappa; V. Vijay
- Music by: Sivaji Raja
- Production company: Quality Pictures
- Release date: 30 January 1988
- Running time: 126 mins
- Country: India
- Language: Telugu

Bava Marudula Saval is a 1988 (transl. Brothers-in-law's Challenge) Telugu-language action drama film, produced by Polamarasetty Appa Rao under the Quality Pictures banner and directed by C. V. Ganesh. It stars Rajendra Prasad, Dr. Rajasekhar, Ramya Krishna and music composed by Sivaji Raja.

== Cast ==
- Rajendra Prasad as Inspector Jai Kumar
- Dr.Rajasekhar as Advocate Vijayakanth
- Sarath Babu as Ranjeeth Kumar & Parasuram (dual role)
- Ramya Krishna as Ramya
- Kalpana as Kalpana
- Jeevitha Rajasekhar as Deepa
- J. V. Somayajulu as Vijay's father
- Vankayala Satyanarayana as Jai's father
- Kasi Viswanath as Bulliraju
- Potti Prasad as Hanumanthu
- Dham

== Soundtrack ==
Bava Marudula Saval

Film score by Sivaji Raja
- Released: 1988
- Genre: Soundtrack
- Length: 20:41
- Label: LEO Audio
- Producer: Sivaji Raja

Music composed by Sivaji Raja. Lyrics were written by Veturi. Music released on LEO Audio Company.

S. No.	Song title	Singers	length
1	"Naa Villu Harivillu"	S. P. Balasubrahmanyam, S. Janaki	3:37
2	"Mali Mali Sandhyalalo"	S. P. Balasubrahmanyam, Vani Jayaram	4:30
3	"Vasanthala Vakililo"	K. J. Yesudas, V. Ramakrishna, Madhavpeddi Ramesh, Vani Jayaram, S. P. Sailaja	5:33
4	"Amma Donga"	Madhavpeddi Ramesh, P. Susheela, Vani Jayaram	4:04
5	"Vadalanura Valapunura"	Chitra	3:07
