= Ramya Krishnan =

Indian actress (born 1970)

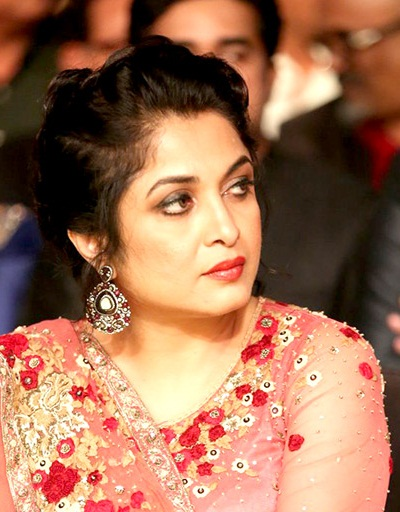
- Ramya in 2016
- Born: 15 September 1970 (age 56); Madras, Tamil Nadu, India
- Other name: Ramya Krishna
- Occupation: Actress
- Years active: 1984–present
- Works: Full list
- Spouse: Krishna Vamsi (m. 2003)
- Children: 1
- Relatives: Cho Ramaswamy (uncle)

Ramya Krishnan (born 15 September 1970), also credited as Ramya Krishna, is an Indian actress known predominantly for her work in Telugu and Tamil films, along with appearances in Kannada, Malayalam and Hindi films.

== Early life ==
Ramya was born on 15 September 1970 in Madras (present-day Chennai), Tamil Nadu to a Telugu father. She is the niece of Tamil film actor and former Member of Parliament, Rajya Sabha Cho Ramaswamy.

== Film career ==
=== Debut and early struggles (1984–1988) ===
She started her acting career with the Malayalam film Neram Pularumbol. Although this was the first movie where she acted, it had a delayed release in 1986. Her first release was Vellai Manasu in 1985, a Tamil movie opposite Y. G. Mahendra. Her first Telugu film was Bhalae Mithrulu (1986). Then she went on to play supporting roles in Tamil films which include Padikkadavan (1985) starring Rajinikanth where she was given a uncredited role and Per Sollum Pillai (1987) starring Kamal Haasan. In Telugu, she starred with Rajendra Prasad in Madana Gopaludu (1987), Bhama Kalapam (1988), Asthulu Anthasthulu (1988) and Bava Marudula Saval (1988). She worked in Malayalam films such as Orkkappurathu, Aryan and Anuragi with Mohanlal. She enjoyed success in Kannada movies as well. One of her earlier roles as heroine was in Krishna Rukmini opposite superstar Vishnuvardhan. She played a small role in the Hindi film Dayavan that starred veteran actor Vinod Khanna.

=== Breakthrough in Telugu and Hindi (1989–1998) ===
After a series of failures in both Tamil and Telugu, she achieved fame through K. Viswanath's Sutradharulu, released in 1989. Her breakthrough came from K. Raghavendra Rao directorial movies where she emerged as a commercial romantic diva, due to successful movies such as Alludugaru (1990), Allari Mogudu (1992), Major Chandrakanth (1993) along with Mohan Babu and Allari Priyudu (1993) along with Rajasekhar. She played the role of a devoted wife of Sri Annamacharya, which was played by Nagarjuna in the film Annamayya (1997). In 1998, she played a leading role in Kante Koothurne Kanu. She received a Nandi Award for Best Actress from the Government of Andhra Pradesh for her performance in the film. Her biggest Kannada hits include Gadibidi Ganda (1993) and Mangalyam Tantunanena (1998) with Ravichandran.

Ramya made her debut as a heroine in Hindi films with Yash Chopra's Parampara (1993). She acted in a few more Hindi films including Subhash Ghai's Khalnayak (1993), Mahesh Bhatt's Chaahat (1996), David Dhawan's Banarasi Babu (1997), and Bade Miyan Chote Miyan (1998) along with Amitabh Bachchan and Govinda and Shapath with Mithun Chakraborty.

=== Comeback to Tamil cinema and Debut in TV serials (1999–2014) ===
After a four-year break from Tamil cinema, in 1999, Ramya played the female antagonist, Neelambari in Padayappa opposite Rajinikanth. The critic from Rediff stated "Ramya does a fantastic job. She is vicious to her dying breath, when she declares she will revenge herself in her next life. She does a fabulous tandav of rage when her father commits suicide". She went onto receive several awards including Filmfare Award for Best Actress - Tamil and Tamil Nadu State Film Award Special Prize. She then starred in commercially successful films like Budget Padmanabhan and Panchatanthiram. The critic from Screen called her performance in Panchatanthiram "one of the finest performances ever". Ramya has also acted in many devotional films including Rajakali Amman (2000), Nageswari (2001), Sri Raja Rajeshwari (2001) and Annai Kaligambal (2003).

Her notable film in Malayalam was Ore Kadal (2007) with Mammootty, which received the National Film Award for Best Feature Film in Malayalam. She had acted as the mother-in-law of N. T. Rama Rao Jr. in the movie Naa Alludu (2005) marked for her role and later in the film Konchem Ishtam Konchem Kashtam (2009). She also appeared in a guest role in item songs in Tollywood and Kollywood.

She turned to acting in TV serials before hosting a game show called Thanga Vettai, on Sun TV, and judging a dance show, Jodi Number One, on Vijay TV. Ramya is stepping in television serials for the first time. She was seen in Kalasam in two roles. One of them is Neelambari, a character she played in the Rajinikanth starrer Padayappa. In 2009, she appeared in Suresh Krissna's Arumugam and Rama Narayanan's Kutti Pisasu.

She continued her stay under the Sun TV banner to act in Thangam, Vamsam and Rajakumari. Later, she acted in supporting roles in Telugu as Ranga The Donga (2010), Yamudiki Mogudu (2012) and in Kannada as Sweety Nanna Jodi (2013) and Maanikya (2014).

=== 2015–present ===
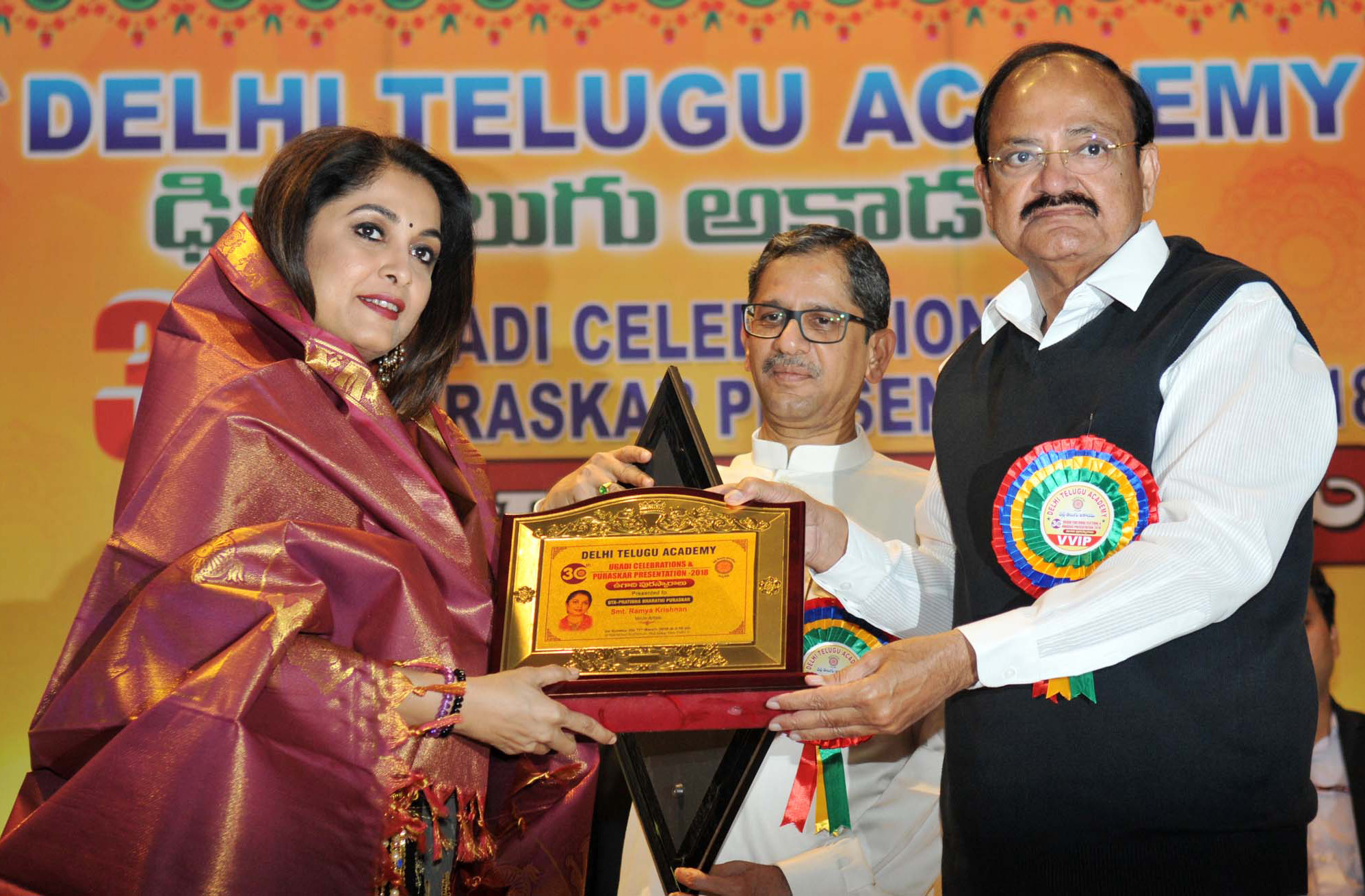
Vice-President Venkaiah Naidu gives a special award to Ramya Krishnan, at the 30th Ugadi Celebrations & Puraskar Presentation - 2018, organised by Delhi Telugu Academy, in New Delhi

In 2015, Ramya acted in S.S. Rajamouli's film Baahubali: The Beginning and its sequel Baahubali: The Conclusion, where she played Rajamata Sivagami Devi. Her performance met with the critical acclaim and the films became the highest grossing Indian films. Sangeetha Devi Dundoo praised Ramya's performance and stated "Ramya Krishnan once again aces with her part". She received the Filmfare Award for Best Supporting Actress - Telugu for both films. In 2019, she played a porn actress in Super Deluxe directed by Thiagarajan Kumararaja. Srivatsan S from The Hindu stated her role as "boldest role yet".

She made her debut in the digital platform with Queen in 2019. The critic from India Today stated, "Ramya Krishnan as the failing actress and a budding politician (the later part of Shakthi's life) puts in a measured performance and it is what stands out in a series that relies heavily on performances". In 2022, Ramya appeared in Dharma Productions and Puri Jagannadh's sports action film Liger. The 2023 Tamil film Jailer featured Ramya in the lead role as Rajinikanth's wife.

In 2025, she played an important role in the Hindi language film Jaat, which stars Sunny Deol and was directed by Gopichand Malineni and produced by Mythri Movie Makers and Zee Studios.

== Personal life ==
She married Telugu film director Krishna Vamsi on 12 June 2003. The couple have a son.

== Awards and nominations ==
Year	Award	Category	Film	Result	Ref
1998	Nandi Awards	Special Jury Award	Kante Koothurne Kanu	Won	
1999	Tamil Nadu State Film Awards	Special Prize	Padayappa	Won	
1999	Filmfare Awards South	Best Actress – Tamil	Padayappa	Won	
2009	57th Filmfare Awards South	Best Supporting Actress – Telugu	Konchem Ishtam Konchem Kashtam	Won	
2009	Nandi Awards	Best Supporting Actress	Raju Maharaju	Won	
2015	Nandi Awards	Best Supporting Actress	Baahubali: The Beginning	Won	
2015	Ananda Vikatan Cinema Awards	Best Supporting Actress	Baahubali: The Beginning	Won	
2015	1st IIFA Utsavam	Best Supporting Actress – Telugu	Baahubali: The Beginning	Won	
2015	1st IIFA Utsavam	Best Supporting Actress – Tamil	Baahubali: The Beginning	Won	
2015	63rd Filmfare Awards South	Best Supporting Actress – Telugu	Baahubali: The Beginning	Won	
2017	6th South Indian International Movie Awards	Best Supporting Actress – Malayalam	Aadupuliyattam	Nominated	
2017	65th Filmfare Awards South	Best Supporting Actress – Telugu	Baahubali: The Conclusion	Won	
2017	Behindwoods Gold Medal	Best Supporting Actress	Baahubali: The Conclusion	Won	
2018	7th South Indian International Movie Awards	Best Actress – Telugu	Baahubali: The Conclusion	Nominated	
2019	Zee Cine Awards Tamil	Best Supporting Actor – Female	Super Deluxe	Won	
2019	Ananda Vikatan Cinema Awards	Best Supporting Actor – Female	Super Deluxe	Won	
2019	8th South Indian International Movie Awards	Best Supporting Actor – Female	Thaanaa Serndha Koottam	Nominated	
2024	69th Filmfare Awards South	Best Supporting Actress – Telugu	Ranga Maarthaanda	Nominated	

=== Honours ===
- *Kalaimamani Award - 1999.
