= Tamil Idol =

Indian reality television singing competition

- Genre: Singing competition; Reality show; Talent show
- Presented by: Vikkals Vikram; Pooja Venkat
- Judges: Andrea Jeremiah; Karthik; Benny Dayal
- Country of origin: India
- Original language: Tamil
- No. of seasons: 1

Production
- Producer: Aradhana Bhola
- Production locations: Chennai, Tamil Nadu
- Running time: 60-70 minutes
- Production company: Fremantle

Original release
- Network: Sony Vizha; SonyLIV
- Release: 24 October 2026 – present

Tamil Idol is a 2026 Indian Tamil language reality television singing competition television series and is part of Indian Idol. The program follows the British show Pop Idol. The program, which debuted on 24 October 2026, seeks to discover the best playback recording voice and singing talent in Tamil Nadu through a series of statewide auditions.

Playback singers Karthik and Benny Dayal as a judge alongside actor and singer Andrea, while Oscar-winning composer A. R. Rahman will appear as the show’s super judge, Vikkals Vikram and Pooja Venkat is hosting the show. It premiered on Sony Vizha on 24 October 2026, and airs on Saturday and Sunday at 20:00 and streams digitally on SonyLIV.

== Series overview ==
Season	Original broadcast	
Season	First aired	Last aired
1	24 October 2026	TBA

== Season 1 ==
=== Tamil Idol season 1 ===
The first season premiered on 24 October 2026, and airs on Saturday and Sunday at 20:00.

=== Top 17 Contestants ===
Name	Hometown	Result	Place
Ayshwarya Venkat	Chennai		
N.R.K Arun			
S. Akash			
Ramya Ram			
Eshwar	Chengalpattu		
Keerthana Shriram			
Ravi			
Lavanya Sree			
Dharshni			
Kavya			
Selva	Poondi, Thanjavur		
Snowyca			
Devana Sriya			
Vikram			
Meghna			
Aadithyadev	Thrissur		
Amrit			

== See also ==
- Indian Idol
