= Single Pasanga =

Tamil-language reality show

- Genre: Reality Show
- Presented by: Manimegalai
- Judges: R. Parthiban (Epi:1-3); T. Rajendar (Epi:4-19); Shrutika Arjun(Epi:1-3); Alya Manasa (Epi:1-19); Kaniha (Epi:5-10/13-19); Sujitha (Epi:11-12)
- Original language: Tamil
- No. of seasons: 1
- No. of episodes: 19

Production
- Running time: 60 minutes

Original release
- Network: Zee Tamil
- Release: 10 August – 21 December 2025

Related
- The Bachelor

Single Pasanga is a 2025 Indian Tamil-language relationship entertainment reality television series that premiered on Zee Tamil on 10 August 2025. The show features a group of single men from diverse professional backgrounds trying to find the perfect partner for them. It is hosted by Manimegalai. The show was judged by R. Parthiban, Shrutika Arjun and Alya Manasa. R. Parthiban judge the first 3 episodes, while T. Rajendar judge from after episode 4.

This show was ended at 21 December 2025 with 19 Episodes. The Title Winner is Thangapandian while Raavanan as the runner up of the show.

== Format ==
The program features ten social media influencers competing in a series of tasks. The format includes a range of challenges destined to test participants in different situations, as well as interactions that highlight individual personalities and group dynamics.

== Contestants ==
Contestants are listed in order of appearance of the premiere:

- Vignesh Raman – Social media personality and cook; known for influencing about Hinduism and cooking vegetarian dishes on social media.
- Raavanan – Social media influencer.
- Jimikili – Comedian and social media personality; known for his comedy skits on media.
- Thidiyan – Comedian and social media personality.
- Thangapandian – Social media influencer and comedian.
- Kutty Saravanan – Comedian.
- Tamilarasan – Comedian.
- Ragavendra – Motivational speaker.
- Blacky Star Suresh – Social media creator.

== Contestants Status ==
	Contestant	Celebrity partner	Episode entered	Episode exited	Status
1	Thangapandian	Chandini Praksh	1	19	Winner
2	Raavanan	Asha Gowda	1	19	1st Runner
3	Jimikili	Niranjana	1	19	
4	Ragavendra	Pranika	1	19	
5	Saravanan	Upasana RC	1	19	
6	Suresh	Fouzee	1	19	
7	Tamilarasan	Keerthika	1	19	
8	Thidiyan	Kemy	1	N/A	
9	Vignesh	Shilpa	1	N/A	

== Episodes ==
Episode	Airing	Round	Ref
1	10 August 2025	Grand Lunch	
2	10 August 2025	Pairing Round	
3	24 August 2025	Recreation round	
4	31 August 2025	Velainu Vandhutta Vellaikaaran Round	
5	7 September 2025	Reel Jodi VS Real Jodi	
6	14 September 2025	Naanum Hero Than	
7	21 September 2025	Namba Veetu Mappillai Round	
8	28 September 2025	En Veedai Paar Ennai Pidikum	
9	5 October 2025	Pallikudam Pokalama	
10	12 October 2025	Village Tour	
11	19 October 2025	Single Pasanga & Sa Re Ga Ma Pa Seniors season 5 Magasangam	
12	26 October 2025	Oru Kadhai Sollatuma Sir?	
13	2 November 2025	Thaanaa Serndha Koottam	
14	9 November 2025	Unakkaka Ellam Unakkaka	
15	16 November 2025	Namma Orru Manvansani	
16	30 November 2025	Bhakthi Suttru	
17	7 December 2025	Manam Virumputhe	
18	14 December 2025	Manam Virumputhe	
19	21 December 2025	Grand Final	

== Guest appearances ==
Day	Guest/s	Notes	Ref.
1	Pugazh		
