= Dance Jodi Dance season 4 =

Dance Jodi Dance
- Season 4
- Judges: Sneha; Simran; Prashanth; Sangeetha Krish (Special Appearance)
- No. of contestants: 10
- Winners: Gomathy & Kenny
- Runners-up: Nikitha & Naveen
- No. of episodes: 29

Release
- Original network: Zee Tamil
- Original release: 13 June – 20 September 2026

Season chronology
- ← Previous; Season 3 Next → Season 5

Dance Jodi Dance is the fourth season of the Tamil-language dance competition reality television show Dance Jodi Dance. Manimegalai has officially once again been appointed as the host, accompanied by the new host Azhar. The judging panel for this season included three judges Actress Sneha will be joined by new judges Simran and Prashanth.

The season of Dance Jodi Dance features an all-women contest lineup for the first time. It premiered on Zee Tamil on 13 June 2026, and aired every Saturday and Sunday at 19:00. Also, available for streaming on ZEE5.

The Grand Finale of the show took place on 20 September 2026. Gomathy and Kenny were declared the title winners, while Nikitha and Naveen were declared the runners-up.

== Top 5 Finalist ==
The Grand finale event was held at Nehru stadium Chennai on 20 September 2026. The winners are listed below:

#	Contestants	Status
1	Gomathy & Kenny	Winner
2	Nikitha & Navin	1st Runner-Up
3	Arunima & Abhishek	2nd Runner-Up
4	Shalini & Britto	
5	Sandra & Gajini	

== Contestants ==
A total of eight celebrities, mostly TV actors, are paired with dancers handpicked through auditions and will go head to head in their quest to be best performers.

#	Contestants	Hometown	Celebrity partner
1	Rithika	Chennai	Mukund
2	Surya Kutty	Coimbatore	Madhan
3	Gomathy	Chennai	Nishanth
4	Shalini	Vellore	Britto
5	Mounika	Bengaluru	Mahesh
6	Swathika	Kerala	Naresh
7	Nikitha	Hosur	Naveen
8	Sandra	Ooty	Gajani
9	Keerthana		Pasupathi
10	Arunima		Abishek

== Production ==
=== Development ===
After the Sa Re Ga Ma Pa Tamil Li'l Champs season 5 show ended, New version of Dance Jodi Dance began on 13 June 2026 as scheduled. On 5 June 2026, a promo was released on Zee Tamil's social media platforms. Sneha returned to judged, accompanied by the new judges Simran and Prashanth.

Simran, making his comeback after 12 years to judge in Tamil television shows after Zee Tamil’s Dance Tamizha Dance Little Masters Season II. Actor Prashanth is making his comeback to judge in television shows after Kalaignar TV’s Maanada Mayilada 8. Simran and Prashanth who previously acted together in Kannedhirey Thondrinal (1998), Jodi (1999), Parthen Rasithen (2000), Thamizh (2002) and Andhagan (2024). Also, Sneha acted with Pirasanth and Simran. Manimegalai returned as the host, but RJ Vijay left and was succeeded by Azhar.
