= Second Love =

Indian-Tamil reality show

- Title-card
- Genre: Reality
- Based on: MTV Splitsvilla
- Presented by: Ramya Krishnan; Shrutika Arjun
- Original language: Tamil
- No. of seasons: 1

Production
- Producer: Banijay Entertainment

Original release
- Network: Star Vijay
- Release: 13 July 2026 – present

Second Love is an Indian Tamil-language television dating reality show that aires on Star Vijay and is digitally available on JioHotstar. The first season is presented by Ramya Krishnan and Shrutika Arjun.

== Summary ==
The show revolves around men and women in their 20s and 30s trying to secure a place in Villa, a villa where they are detached from the real world. As participants move into a luxury villa to heal from past breakups and divorces and rediscover love by mingling with other residents.

== Series overview ==
Season	Host(s)	Location	Theme(s)	Launch date	Finale date	Episodes	Contestants	Winners
1	Ramya Krishnan; Shrutika Arjun	TBA	TBA	13 July 2026	15 August 2026	35	15	TBA

== Season 1 ==
Second Love
- Season 1
- Season 1 poster
- Presented by: Ramya Krishnan; Shrutika Arjun
- No. of contestants: 15
- Winner: TBA
- Runner-up: TBA
- No. of episodes: TBA

Release
- Original network: Star Vijay
- Original release: 13 July 2026

Second Love 1 premiered on July 13, 2026. It was presented by Ramya Krishnan and Shrutika Arjun. The season initially featured 12 singles, 6 male and 6 female contestants. However 2 male and 1 female contestants entered as Wild Entries into the villa half way.

Contestant	Day Entered	Day Exited	Status
Abid	Day 1	Final	In relationship with Nivedita
Dinesh	Day 1	Final	In relationship with Veena
Monisha Shaji	Day 1	Day 27	Exited Villa
Neha	Day 1	Final	In relationship with Tajes
Nivedita	Day 15	Final	In relationship with Abid
Rex	Day 15	Day 27	Exited Villa
RJ Bravo	Day 15	Day 27	Exited Villa
Sai Priyanka Ruth	Day 1	Final	Rejected Vekky
Sindhoori Vishwanath	Day 1	Day 27	Exited Villa
Tejas Krishnan	Day 1	Final	In relationship with Neha
Veena Jessi	Day 1	Final	In relationship with Dinesh
Vekkey	Day 1	Final	Rejected Priyanka
Eden Kuriakose	Day 1	Day 13	Exited Villa
Raja Rudrakodi	Day 1	Day 13	Exited Villa
Mohamed Azeem	Day 1	Day 13	Exited Villa

indicates a male contestant
indicates a female contestant
