= Neram Pularumbol =

- Directed by: K. P. Kumaran
- Written by: Raghunath Paleri
- Produced by: K. P. Kumaran
- Starring: Mammootty; Mohanlal; Ramya Krishnan; KPAC Lalitha
- Cinematography: Shaji N. Karun; Vasanth Kumar
- Edited by: Venugopal
- Music by: Johnson
- Production company: Giripriya Films
- Distributed by: Giripriya Films
- Release date: 9 May 1986
- Country: India
- Language: Malayalam

Neram Pularumbol is a 1986 Indian Malayalam-language film, directed and produced by K. P. Kumaran. The film stars Mammootty, Mohanlal, Ramya Krishnan and KPAC Lalitha in the lead roles. The film has musical score by Johnson. It was the Malayalam debut of Ramya Krishnan. Although this was her first film during the shoot, her first release happened to be in Tamil through the film, Vellai Manasu (1984).

== Cast ==
- Mohanlal as Godfree
- Mammootty as Brother Lawrence
- Ramya Krishnan as Nancy
- KPAC Lalitha
- Sreenivasan
- Bharath Gopi Father of Nancy
- Nahas
- Idavela Babu
- Jalaja
- Kannur Sreelatha
- Kuttyedathi Vilasini
- Nanditha Bose
- P. K. Abraham as Vicar of Church

== Soundtrack ==
The music was composed by Johnson and the lyrics were written by O. N. V. Kurup.

No.	Song	Singers	Lyrics	Length (m:ss)
1	"Ente Manveenayil"	K. J. Yesudas	O. N. V. Kurup	
2	"Kannikkathirmani"	P. Susheela	O. N. V. Kurup	
