= Chinna Marumagal (TV series) =

2024 Indian Tamil TV series

- Genre: Drama
- Written by: Guru Sampath Kumar; K.Raja; Thamayanthi
- Screenplay by: Ram Srinivas; E. Chandrasekhar; B. Jeyaprakash
- Directed by: M. Manoj Kumar
- Starring: Navin Kumar; Swetha; O.A.K. Sundar
- Theme music composer: Kiran
- Country of origin: India
- Original language: Tamil
- No. of seasons: 1
- No. of episodes: 400+

Production
- Executive producer: Deepika Ramani
- Producer: S. Kushmavathy
- Cinematography: M. Antony; Saravanan
- Camera setup: Multi-camera
- Running time: 22 minutes
- Production company: Estrella Stories

Original release
- Network: Star Vijay
- Release: 22 January 2024 – present

Chinna Marumagal (credited as Chinna Marumagal: 12aam Vaguppu) (transl. Younger Daughter-in-law, 12th class) is a 2024 Tamil television drama series which airs on Star Vijay from 22 January 2024 and is also available on the digital platform Disney+ Hotstar. It stars Navin Kumar and Swetha in lead roles with O.A.K. Sundar in important role. The series is directed by Manoj Kumar and produced by Kushmavathy under Estrella Stories.

== Plot ==
In a tightly-knit community governed by tradition, Tamilselvi, a spirited young girl, harbors a fervent desire to pursue a career in medicine. However, her aspirations clash with the deeply ingrained beliefs of her parents, who adamantly oppose the idea of their daughter venturing into a male-dominated field. Despite her unwavering determination, Tamilselvi finds herself at odds with her family's expectations, with only her sister offering solace and encouragement amidst the disapproval.

As societal pressure mounts, Tamilselvi reluctantly succumbs to the weight of familial pride and cultural norms, resigning herself to the fate of an arranged marriage. Her betrothal is to Sethupathi, the son of the village's influential patriarch, a man staunchly opposed to the education and empowerment of women. Forced into a union that threatens to stifle her ambitions and curtail her freedom, Tamilselvi confronts the daunting prospect of relinquishing her dreams for the sake of conformity.

Yet, amidst the constraints of her circumstances, Tamilselvi refuses to surrender to despair. With unwavering resilience and indomitable spirit, she embarks on a journey of self-discovery and empowerment. Through perseverance and courage, Tamilselvi begins to challenge the oppressive norms that confine her, defying the expectations placed upon her by society and forging her path towards fulfillment.

== Cast ==
=== Main ===
- Navin Kumar as Sethupathi "Sethu" Rajangam, Tamizhselvi’s ex-husband, Aishwarya's husband, Rajangam’s son, comes from a rich patriarchal family. He fell in love with Tamizhselvi and eventually marries her. However, due to a misunderstanding, both get divorced by the panchayat and he eventually marries Aishwarya.
- Swetha as Tamizhselvi "Tamizh" Chellapandi, Sethupathi’s ex-wife, Chellapandi and Vasanthi's daughter, an intelligent schoolgirl who wants to become a doctor.
- O.A.K. Sundar as Rajangam, Sethu's Father, a rich patriarch and a politician. He is a regressive man who doesn't allow women in his family to study and forbade Tamizhselvi from studying after she got married. However, he later changes his mind and allows Tamizh to study medicine.

=== Recurring ===
- Niranjana / Swetha Kumar as Aishwarya, Eeshwari's niece, Sethu's second wife
- Arul Rajan as Chellapandi, Tamizh's Father
- Thamarai Selvi / Reehana.B as Vasanthi, Tamizh's Mother
- V.R. Thilagam as Vellathai, Sethu's Grandmother
- Gowri Janu as Mohana, Sethu's Stepmother
- Shiva Kavitha as Eeshwari, Sethu and Aishwarya's Aunt
- Sankavi Rajendran as Thamarai, Sethu's Cousin
- Banumathy as Savithri, Thamarai's Mother
- Gurupharan as Bose, Eeshwari's Son
- Punitha Balakrishnan as Malar, Bose's ex-wife
- Harshini as Kavya, Bose's second wife
- VJ Mohana as Kanmani, Sethu's younger Sister and Arumugam's wife
- Praveen Devasagayam as Arumugam, Kanmani's husband
- Mahalakshmi as Chitra, Eeshwari's Daughter
- Minor Yogi as Karuppu, Sethu's Uncle
- Dharshini as Dhanam, Tamizh's Sister
- Shravan Sakthi / Muthukumarasamy as Sanaasi, Rajangam's Brother, Eeshwari's Husband
- Theni Rajesh as Natesan, Rajangam's Elder Son
- Swetha Subramanian as Poorani, Natesan's Wife
- Atchaya Barathi as Bhavani, Sethu's Elder Sister
- Vedha Doss as Maaran, Bhavani's Husband
- Priya as Tamizhselvi’s school principal
- Y. G. Mahendran as Minister
- Kiruba as Maheswari, a minister wife
- Krish as Sakthi, Tamizh’s Friend
- Sreedevi as Jenny, Sakthi’s wife
- KPY Dhanasekar as Kamesh Pichai, Thamarai Ex Husband

== Production ==
=== Casting ===
Navin Kumar was cast in the main male lead role as Sethupathi, marking his return after Kanda Naal Mudhal and Idhayathai Thirudathe. At the end of June 2025, Geetha was cast for a special appearances.

== Reception ==
The show got a TVR of 5.58 on its first week (Week 04 2024).
