= Bigg Boss (Tamil TV series) =

Indian Tamil-language reality TV program

- Show's tenth season logo with host Vijay Sethupathi
- Based on: Big Brother
- Presented by: Kamal Haasan (1–7); Vijay Sethupathi (8–present)
- Opening theme: "BB Anthem"
- Country of origin: India
- Original language: Tamil
- No. of seasons: 10
- No. of episodes: 1053

Production
- Production location: Chennai
- Camera setup: Multi-camera
- Running time: 90 minutes (seasons 1, 2; weekdays); 120 minutes (seasons 1, 2; weekends); 60 minutes (season 3 to 10; weekdays); 90 minutes (season 3 to 10; weekends)
- Production company: Endemol Shine India

Original release
- Network: Star Vijay
- Release: 25 June 2017

Bigg Boss is an Indian Tamil-language version of the reality television program of the same name. The program follows the Big Brother format developed by Endemol in the Netherlands. Since its premiere on June 25, 2017, the show has rolled out eight seasons and two spin-off version. The first seven seasons were hosted by Kamal Haasan, followed by Vijay Sethupathi from the eighth season onwards, with Ramya Krishnan making guest-host appearances during the fifth and tenth seasons.. As of season 10, a total of 206 contestants have participated in Bigg Boss. Bigg Boss has aired a total of 1053 episodes.

== Overview ==
=== Concept ===
Bigg Boss is a reality show based on the original Dutch Big Brother format developed by John de Mol Jr. Unlike original Big Brother, Bigg Boss features celebrity and commoner contestants. The contestants (known as "housemates") live in a house that is isolated from the world. Following anonymous internal voting by the housemates and external voting by television audiences, one housemate is "evicted" (removed) from the house each week. During the final week, the final four or five housemates vote to determine the show's winner. The eponymous Bigg Boss character serves as an omnipresent authority figure and represents the show's producers. He often interacts with the housemates to assign challenges and ask questions.

=== House ===
For all of the Bigg Boss seasons the house was located at EVP Film City, Chennai. The house is well-furnished and decorated. It has a variety of modern amenities, but just one or multiple bedrooms and four toilet bath rooms. There is a garden, outdoor seating, pool, activity area, smoking zone, gym, jail and lounge room in the house. There is also a Confession Room, where the housemates may be called in by Bigg Boss for any kind of conversation, and for the nomination process. In season seven, the house was split and there was another added confession room.

=== Rules ===
Housemates are bound by various rules. For example, contestants must speak Tamil, although usage of English or other languages can be permissible while speaking. Tampering with any electronic equipment or other items in the house is strictly prohibited. They may not leave the premises at any time without permission. Physical violence is completely forbidden. Discussing the nomination process with anyone is also not allowed. Housemates must remain awake until the lights go off.

Occasionally, housemates may be nominated for various reasons, including being chosen by individuals with special privileges obtained through tasks, for breaking rules, or for other unspecified reasons. In serious cases, a contestant may face expulsion from the house.

=== Airing ===
Daily episodes present the main events of the previous day while weekend episodes focus on discussion of the main problems of the week and interviews with evicted contestants. On the Sunday episode the host announces the evicted contestant.

=== Eviction ===
Contestants are nominated for eviction each week by their housemates. Viewers cast their votes in favour of the contestants they would like to save from eviction. Each viewer is entitled to cast one vote per day (used to be 50 votes for S1–S4, 10 votes for S5). The contestant with the fewest votes is out. Contestants who break the rules or who leave the house for medical reasons are evicted. During week 14 or 15 (before finale), Contestants get an option to be evicted from the game by their own decision by accepting the cash prize eviction and self evict themselves.

=== Broadcast ===
Bigg Boss is aired on Star Vijay and is also available for streaming on JioHotstar (formerly Disney+ Hotstar in India). Everyday episodes contain the main happenings of the previous day. Every Sunday episode mainly focuses on an interview of an evicted contestant by the host. The unseen episode will be available as Bigg Boss Unseen on Vijay Music (sister channel to Star Vijay).

From Season 6 onward, Bigg Boss introduced a 24/7 Live Channel for JioHotstar subscribers.

== Series details ==
Series	Host	Location	House Theme	Tagline	Episodes	Originally released			Housemates	Days	Launch TRP Ratings (Urban + Rural - Overall Peak) (Note: Ratings)	Finale TRP Ratings (Urban + Rural - Overall Peak) (Note: Ratings)	Prize Money	Winner	Runner up
Series	Host	Location	House Theme	Tagline	Episodes	First released	Last released	Network	Housemates	Days	Launch TRP Ratings (Urban + Rural - Overall Peak)	Finale TRP Ratings (Urban + Rural - Overall Peak)	Prize Money	Winner	Runner up
1	Kamal Haasan	Chennai	Middle Class House	Odavum Mudiyadhu, Oliyavum Mudiyadhu!	98	25 June 2017	30 September 2017	Star Vijay	19	98	7.4 TRP	8.2 TRP	₹50 lakh (US$53,000)	Arav Nafeez	Snehan
2	Kamal Haasan	Chennai	Steampunk Gear	Nallavar Yaar? Kettavar Yaar?	106	17 June 2018	30 September 2018	Star Vijay	17	105	9.70 TRP	10.1 TRP	₹50 lakh (US$53,000)	Riythvika	Aishwarya Dutta
3	Kamal Haasan	Chennai	Chettinad Museum	Idhu Verum Show valla, Namma Life!	106	23 June 2019	6 October 2019	Star Vijay	17	105	8.1 TRP	9.0 TRP	₹50 lakh (US$53,000)	Mugen Rao	Sandy
4	Kamal Haasan	Chennai	Indian Flora & Fauna	Thappunna Thatti Ketpen, Nalladhuna Thatti Kodupen!	106	4 October 2020	17 January 2021	Star Vijay	18	105	11.61 TRP	10.80 TRP	₹50 lakh (US$53,000)	Aari Arujunan	Balaji Murugadoss
5	Kamal Haasan Ramya Krishnan ( Week 8)	Chennai	Five Elements of Earth	Inga Veedum Perusu, Galattavum Perusu!	106	3 October 2021	16 January 2022	Star Vijay	20	105	8.5 TRP	8.9 TRP	₹50 lakh (US$53,000)	Raju Jeyamohan	Priyanka Deshpande
6	Kamal Haasan	Chennai	Luxury Mansion	Veedu Ready. Vettaiku Neenga Ready ah?	106	9 October 2022	22 January 2023	Star Vijay	21	105	5.54 TRP	6.1 TRP	₹50 lakh (US$53,000) (Note: The winner won ₹50 lakh and was also awarded the new Suzuki Brezza car.)	Mohammed Azeem	Vikraman Radhakrishnan
7	Kamal Haasan	Chennai	Split Fairy Tale World	Rendula Onnu Paathuralam!	106	1 October 2023	14 January 2024	Star Vijay	23	105	6.8 TRP	7.2 TRP	₹50 lakh (US$53,000) (Note: The winner won ₹50 lakh and was also awarded the new Maruti Suzuki Nexa grand Vitara car and a plot worth ₹15.)	Archana Ravichandran	Manichandra
8	Vijay Sethupathi	Chennai	Enchanted Forest	Aalum Puthusu! Aatamum Puthusu!	106	6 October 2024	19 January 2025	Star Vijay	24	105	5.7 TRP	4.7 TRP	₹40.5 lakh (US$43,000)	Muthukumaran Jegatheesan	Soundariya Nanjundan
9	Vijay Sethupathi	Chennai	Egyptian and Mesopotamian architecture	Paaka paaka thaan puriyum! Poga poga thaan theriyum!	106	5 October 2025	18 January 2026	Star Vijay	24	105	5.5 TRP	6.1 TRP	₹50 lakh (US$53,000) (Note: The winner won ₹50 lakh and was also awarded the new Maruti Suzuki Victoris car.)	Divya Ganesh	R. Sabarinathan
10	Vijay Sethupathi Ramya Krishnan ( Week 7)	Chennai	Earth/Nature theme	Inga Onnu Ninacha Pathu Nadakkum!	106	6 September 2026	TBA	Star Vijay	24	105	TBA	TBA	₹50 lakh (US$53,000)	TBA	TBA

== Reception ==
=== Season 1 ===
The Bigg Boss Tamil program is regarded as the most expensive Tamil television show. The show continued to scale new heights, with exceptional ratings averaging 8.4 TVR over the first 6 weeks. It received a 14.25 TVR on the grand finale day.

=== Season 2 ===
The launch of season 2 opened with 9.72 TVR.

=== Season 3 ===
The launch of Season 3 achieved an impressive opening with a 9.8 TVR, maintaining strong viewership throughout with weekly TRPs ranging between 7.8 TVR and 8.8 TVR.

=== Season 4 ===
The launch of season 4 opened with the highest ever 11.61 TVR, benefited from the impact of season 3 and lockdown, and also broke the records for viewership for Bigg Boss Tamil grand finale episode.

=== Season 5 ===
Season 5 received a generally mixed response from the audience for the way they conducted Ticket to Finale week without any proper tasks, and it was one of the few seasons with a low viewership. The TRP ratings for this season went down in the first three weeks.

=== Season 6 ===
The launch of season 6 received a TRP rating of 5.54 TVR, which is considered below average for a season premiere. Season 6 recorded the lowest viewership for a season finale in Bigg Boss Tamil franchise.

=== Season 7 ===
The launch of season 7 received a TRP rating of 9.9 TVR, which was seen as a comeback for the franchise. The season finale had a TRP rating of 8.71 TVR. In its season finale, it was reported that this had been the biggest season in the Bigg Boss Tamil franchise in terms of viewership and number of votes. Throughout the season, the show consistently registered high ratings reaching a peak in the later weeks with a TVR of 7.0 across Tamil Nadu

=== Season 8 ===
The launch of season 8 received a TRP rating of 9.0 TVR, which is seen as a continuous success of the Bigg Boss franchise. In its first week, the show attracted over 32 million viewers on TV, while total watch time soared to 4.4 billion minutes across all platforms, including digital and Hotstar. Finale episode recorded a TRP rating of 8.50 TVR.

=== Season 9 ===
The launch of season 9 received an overwhelming response especially on the streaming platform JioHotstar with the launch day episode registered 7.8 crore minutes of cumulative watch time and achieved 1.74x higher reach compared to the previous edition with launch TRP 5.61..

== Spin-offs ==
=== Bigg Boss Ultimate ===
The series is also set to roll out a digital version of the show called Bigg Boss Ultimate which is also going to be hosted by Kamal Haasan and broadcast by Disney+ Hotstar for 24×6 coverage. The series was eventually hosted by Silambarasan after Haasan had to opt out due to scheduling conflicts with his latest release, Vikram.

=== Bigg Boss The Common Man ===
It is a digital pre-show of the main Bigg Boss. It will feature contestants from selected commoners to earn their spot in the main house.

== Companion shows ==
=== Bigg Boss Fun Unlimited ===
It is a talk show in which the evicted housemates of that season are interviewed about their journey. This show was introduced for Bigg Boss 2 and later discontinued from Bigg Boss 3. The show once again continued from Bigg Boss 8. The show aired on Vijay Super and Disney+ Hotstar.

Year	Season	Show	Host
2018	2	Bigg Boss Fun Unlimited	Rio Raj
2024	8	Bigg Boss 8 Fun Unlimited	R Sabarinathan

=== Bigg Boss Kondattam ===
It is aired after the Finale of every season, where the contestants reunite for a special event. This grand celebration will feature energetic performances, fun interactions, and memorable moments

Year	Season	Show	Host(s)
2017	1	Bigg Boss S1 Kondattam	Erode Mahesh, Priyanka Deshpande, Rio Raj, Andrews, Ramya Subramanian, Gopinath Chandran, Ma Ka Pa Anand
2018	2	Bigg Boss S2 Kondattam	Rio Raj
2018	2	A Happening Celebration	Rio Raj
2019	3	Bigg Boss S3 Kondattam	Gopinath Chandran
2021	4	Bigg Boss S4 Kondattam	Dhivyadharshini
2022	5	Bigg Boss S5 Kondattam	Archana Chandhoke
2023	6	Bigg Boss S6 Kondattam	Priyanka Deshpande
2024	7	Bigg Boss S7 Kondattam	Priyanka Deshpande
2025	8	Bigg Boss S8 Kondattam	Priyanka Deshpande
2025	8	Bigg Boss S8 Kondattam II	Priyanka Deshpande

== Housemates pattern ==
Occupation	Season 1	Season 2	Season 3	Season 4	Season 5	Season 6	Season 7	Season 8	Season 9	Season 10
Film Actor/Actress	Anuya Y. Bhagvath	Aishwarya Dutta	Fathima Babu	Aari Arujunan	Abhinay Vaddi	Maheshwari Chanakyan	Akshaya Udayakumar	Sachana Namidass	Fredrick Jhonson	Pandi
Film Actor/Actress	Bharani	Daniel Annie Pope	Kasthuri Shankar	Gabriella Natalie Charlton	Ciby Bhuvana Chandran	Sheriina	Cool Suresh	Ranjith	Aadhirai Soundarajan	Asmitha Neelamegam
Film Actor/Actress	Bindu Madhavi	Janani Iyer	Reshma Pasupuleti	Jithan Ramesh	Sanjeev Venkatsubramaniam	Vikraman Radhakrishnan	Maya S. Krishnan	Soundariya Nanjundan	Prajin Padmanabhan	Chandini Tamilarasan
Film Actor/Actress	Ganesh Venkatraman	Mahat Raghavendra	Sakshi Agarwal	Ramya Pandian	Varun Kamal	—N/a	Pradeep Antony	Shiva Kumar	Sandra Amy	Raaghav Ranganathan
Film Actor/Actress	Harish Kalyan	Mumtaz Khan	Saravanan	Rekha Josephine Harris	—N/a	—N/a	Vichithra Williams	—N/a	—N/a	—N/a
Film Actor/Actress	Kaajal Pasupathi	Ponnambalam	Sherin Shringar	—N/a	—N/a	—N/a	—N/a	—N/a	—N/a	—N/a
Film Actor/Actress	Namitha Mukesh Vankawala	Riythvika Pannerselvam	Vanitha Vijayakumar	—N/a	—N/a	—N/a	—N/a	—N/a	—N/a	—N/a
Film Actor/Actress	Oviya Nelson	Shariq Hassan Khan	—N/a	—N/a	—N/a	—N/a	—N/a	—N/a	—N/a	—N/a
Film Actor/Actress	Shakthi Vasudevan	Vijayalakshmi Aghathiyan	—N/a	—N/a	—N/a	—N/a	—N/a	—N/a	—N/a	—N/a
Film Actor/Actress	Shri Ram Natarajan	Yashika Aannand	—N/a	—N/a	—N/a	—N/a	—N/a	—N/a	—N/a	—N/a
Film Actor/Actress	Suja Varunee	—N/a	—N/a	—N/a	—N/a	—N/a	—N/a	—N/a	—N/a	—N/a
Comedian	Harathi Ganeshkar	Dhaadi Balaji	Jangiri Madhumitha	Aranthangi Nisha	Imman Annachi	Amudhavanan	Anna Bharathi	—N/a	Vikkals Vikram	—N/a
Comedian	Ganja Karuppu	Sendrayan	—N/a	—N/a	—N/a	—N/a	—N/a	—N/a	—N/a	—N/a
Comedian	Vaiyapuri	—N/a	—N/a	—N/a	—N/a	—N/a	—N/a	—N/a	—N/a	—N/a
Choreographer	Gayathri Raghuram	—N/a	Sandy	—N/a	Amir ADS	Robert Raj	Manichandra	—N/a	—N/a	—N/a
Choreographer	—N/a	—N/a	—N/a	—N/a	—N/a	Shanthi Arvind	—N/a	—N/a	—N/a	—N/a
Model	Arav Nafeez Kizar	—N/a	Meera Mithun	Balaji Murugadoss	Akshara Reddy	—N/a	—N/a	Riya Thiyagarajan	Aurora Sinclair	Javeed Sheriff
Model	Raiza Wilson	—N/a	Tharshan Thiyagarajah	Samyuktha Shanmuganathan	Nadia Chang	—N/a	—N/a	—N/a	Viyana	—N/a
Model	—N/a	—N/a	—N/a	Sanam Shetty	Niroop Nandakumar	—N/a	—N/a	—N/a	—N/a	—N/a
Model	—N/a	—N/a	—N/a	—N/a	Suruthi Periyasamy	—N/a	—N/a	—N/a	—N/a	—N/a
Radio/Video jockey	—N/a	Vaishnavi Prasad	—N/a	—N/a	—N/a	Ram Ramasamy	RJ Bravo	RJ Ananthi Iyappan	VJ Parvathy Saran	—N/a
Radio/Video jockey	—N/a	—N/a	—N/a	—N/a	—N/a	Kathirravan	—N/a	—N/a	—N/a	—N/a
Vocal Coach	—N/a	Ananth Vaidyanathan	—N/a	—N/a	—N/a	—N/a	—N/a	—N/a	—N/a	—N/a
Singer/Rapper/Song Writer	Snehan	Ramya NSK	Mohan Vaidya	Aajeedh Khalique	Chinnaponnu	Aaryan Dinesh Kanagaratnam	Nixen	Gana Jeffry Tinku	Gana Vinoth Kumar	—N/a
Singer/Rapper/Song Writer	—N/a	—N/a	Mugen Rao	Suchitra Ramadurai	Isaivani	Asal Kolaar	Yugendran Vasudevan	—N/a	—N/a	—N/a
Singer/Rapper/Song Writer	—N/a	—N/a	—N/a	Velmurugan	Iykki Berry	—N/a	Gana Bala Murugan	—N/a	—N/a	—N/a
Dancer	—N/a	—N/a	—N/a	—N/a	—N/a	—N/a	Aishu ADS	—N/a	—N/a	—N/a
Dancer	—N/a	—N/a	—N/a	—N/a	—N/a	—N/a	Vijay Varma	—N/a	—N/a	—N/a
TV Personality	—N/a	Mamathi Chari	Abhirami Venkatachalam	Anitha Sampath	Pavni Reddy	Mohammed Azeem	Archana Ravichandran	Dharsha Gupta	Praveen Raj Devasagayam	Lakshmi Priya
TV Personality	—N/a	—N/a	Kavin Raj	Archana Chandhoke	Priyanka Deshpande	Rachitha Mahalakshmi	Raveena Daha	Deepak Dinkar	Kamrudin K	Vinoth Babu
TV Personality	—N/a	—N/a	Losliya Mariyanesan	Rio Raj	Raju Jeyamohan	Myna Nandhini	Saravana Vickram	Sathya SK	Vyshali Kemkar	Adavadi Ansar
TV Personality	—N/a	—N/a	—N/a	Shivani Narayanan	—N/a	Ayesha Zeenath Beevi	Vinusha Devi	Raanav VC	R. Sabarinathan	Shathiga
TV Personality	—N/a	—N/a	—N/a	Suresh Chakravarthy	—N/a	Janany Kunaseelan	Vishnu Vijay	Pavithra Janani	Kani Thiru	Muthazhagi Parveen
TV Personality	—N/a	—N/a	—N/a	—N/a	—N/a	Manikandan Rajesh	Dinesh Gopalsamy	Arun Prasath	Divya Ganesh	Avinash Ashok
TV Personality	—N/a	—N/a	—N/a	—N/a	—N/a	Nivaashiyni Krishnan	—N/a	Tharshika Navaratnaraja	Amit Bhargav	Akshitha Ashok
TV Personality	—N/a	—N/a	—N/a	—N/a	—N/a	Queency Stanly	—N/a	VJ Vishal	—N/a	Kumaran Thangarajan
TV Personality	—N/a	—N/a	—N/a	—N/a	—N/a	—N/a	—N/a	Anshitha Akbarsha	—N/a	Mukesh MK
TV Personality	—N/a	—N/a	—N/a	—N/a	—N/a	—N/a	—N/a	Arnav Amjath Khan	—N/a	Anandhi Ajay
TV Personality	—N/a	—N/a	—N/a	—N/a	—N/a	—N/a	—N/a	Jacquline Lydia	—N/a	Dhanyaa Pallath
TV Personality	—N/a	—N/a	—N/a	—N/a	—N/a	—N/a	—N/a	Sunita Gogoi	—N/a	—N/a
TV Personality	—N/a	—N/a	—N/a	—N/a	—N/a	—N/a	—N/a	Varshini Venkat	—N/a	—N/a
TV Personality	—N/a	—N/a	—N/a	—N/a	—N/a	—N/a	—N/a	Rayan	—N/a	—N/a
Director	—N/a	—N/a	Cheran	—N/a	—N/a	—N/a	—N/a	—N/a	Praveen Gandhi	—N/a
Producer	—N/a	—N/a	—N/a	—N/a	—N/a	—N/a	—N/a	Ravindar Chandrasekaran	—N/a	—N/a
Martial Artist	—N/a	—N/a	—N/a	Som Shekar	—N/a	—N/a	—N/a	—N/a	—N/a	—N/a
Fashion Designer	—N/a	—N/a	—N/a	—N/a	Madhumitha Raghunathan	—N/a	—N/a	—N/a	—N/a	—N/a
Social Media Fame	—N/a	—N/a	—N/a	—N/a	Abishek Raaja	GP Muthu	Ananya Rao	Muthukumaran Jegadeesan	T. Dhiwagar	Prithvinath Balaganesan
Social Media Fame	—N/a	—N/a	—N/a	—N/a	—N/a	—N/a	Poornima Ravi	—N/a	Tushaar Jayaprakash	Savinya Velu
Social Media Fame	—N/a	—N/a	—N/a	—N/a	—N/a	—N/a	—N/a	—N/a	Ramya Joo	Vaikuntha Vasan (TTF Vasan)
Social Media Fame	—N/a	—N/a	—N/a	—N/a	—N/a	—N/a	—N/a	—N/a	Subiksha Kumar	—N/a
Social Media Fame	—N/a	—N/a	—N/a	—N/a	—N/a	—N/a	—N/a	—N/a	Kalaiyarasan	—N/a
Writer	—N/a	—N/a	—N/a	—N/a	—N/a	—N/a	Bava Chelladurai	—N/a	—N/a	—N/a
Orator	—N/a	—N/a	—N/a	—N/a	—N/a	—N/a	—N/a	Manjari Narayanan	—N/a	—N/a
LGBTQ Community	–	–	–	–	Namitha Marimuthu	Shivin Ganesan	–	–	Apsara CJ	–
Non-Celebrity	Maria Juliana	Nithya Balaji	—N/a	—N/a	Thamarai Selvi	Dhanalakshmi	Jovika Vijayakumar	—N/a	Nandhini Ravikumar	Muniyammal Banumathi
Non-Celebrity	Maria Juliana	Nithya Balaji	—N/a	—N/a	Thamarai Selvi	Dhanalakshmi	Jovika Vijayakumar	—N/a	Nandhini Ravikumar	Karishma Sama'
Non-Celebrity	Maria Juliana	Nithya Balaji	—N/a	—N/a	Thamarai Selvi	Dhanalakshmi	Jovika Vijayakumar	—N/a	Nandhini Ravikumar	Jason Kaushi
Non-Celebrity	Maria Juliana	Nithya Balaji	—N/a	—N/a	Thamarai Selvi	Dhanalakshmi	Jovika Vijayakumar	—N/a	Nandhini Ravikumar	Manivannan Uppiliappan
Non-Celebrity	Maria Juliana	Nithya Balaji	—N/a	—N/a	Thamarai Selvi	Dhanalakshmi	Jovika Vijayakumar	—N/a	Nandhini Ravikumar	Shama M
Winner First runner-up Finalist Ticket to finale Cash walkout
Winner	Arav	Riythvika	Mugen Rao	Aari Arjunan	Raju Jeyamohan	Mohammed Azeem	Archana Ravichandran	Muthukumaran Jegadeesan	Divya Ganesh	TBA
Runner-up	Snehan	Aishwarya Dutta	Sandy	Balaji Murugadoss	Priyanka Deshpande	Vikraman Radhakrishnan	Manichandra	Soundariya Nanjundan	R. Sabarinathan	TBA
