= Bigg Boss The Common Man =

- Show's first logo with Host and Judges
- Based on: Bigg Boss Agnipariksha
- Presented by: Maya S. Krishnan; Kani Thiru
- Judges: Oviya; Aari Arujunan; Raju Jeyamohan
- Country of origin: India
- Original language: Tamil
- No. of seasons: 1
- No. of episodes: 8

Production
- Production location: Chennai
- Running time: 45–60 minutes (approx.)
- Production company: Endemol Shine India

Original release
- Network: Star Vijay; JioHotstar
- Release: 16 August 2026

Related
- Bigg Boss; Bigg Boss Ultimate

Bigg Boss The Common Man is a spin-off and pre-show of the Indian Tamil-language reality television show Bigg Boss. The pre-show involves selecting contestants that are not celebrities for the main show. The format of the show is based on the Telugu-language television show Bigg Boss Agnipariksha.

The show is hosted by former contestants Maya S. Krishnan and Kani Thiru whilst Oviya, Aari Arujunan and Raju Jeyamohan are the judges. The winners will compete as contestants in the main Bigg Boss house.

== Series overview ==
Season	Host	Judges			Episodes	Originally released			Contestants		
Season	Host	Judges			Episodes	First released	Last released	Network	Auditioned	Selected for Common Man	Entered in Main Season
1	Maya S. Krishnan; Kani Thiru	Aari Arujunan	Oviya	Raju Jayamohan	TBA	16 August 2026	6 September 2026	Star Vijay, JioHotstar	50	22	Jason Muniyammal Karishma Shama Manivanna

== Contestants pattern ==
The contestants who are selected for the final round are only listed here. The winners will enter the main Bigg Boss house as commoner contestants.

Seasons	Season 1 (BBS10)
Top Contestants	A. Thadeeshwaran
Top Contestants	Shobha Indrakumar
Top Contestants	Darvin
Top Contestants	Muniyammal Banumathi
Top Contestants	Venkatesan D
Top Contestants	Jason Kaushi
Top Contestants	Dhivya Valenteena
Top Contestants	Aasha
Top Contestants	Renjith Kumar
Top Contestants	Baby Prabakaran
Top Contestants	Kalil Basha
Top Contestants	Shama M
Top Contestants	Manivannan Uppiliappan
Top Contestants	Hyte Karty
Top Contestants	Karishma Sama'
Top Contestants	Abinaya
Top Contestants	Aravindh
Top Contestants	Saranya Santhanam
Top Contestants	Samyuktha
Top Contestants	George Rajaselvan
Top Contestants	Sukumaran
Top Contestants	Priyanka Paul
Total	22
Entered into Main Season Entered into Main Season as Wildcard

Entered into the Main Season

Jason Kaushi (Day 0)

Shama M (Day 0 & Evicted on Day 49 )

Muniyammal Banumathi (Day 0)

Manivannan Uppiliappan (Day 4 & Evicted on Day 14 )

Karishma Sama' (Day 28 & Evicted on Day 56 )

Top 12

Shobha Indrakumar

Darwin

Aasha

Priyanka Paul

Abinaya

Aravindh

Sukumaran
