= Bigg Boss (Tamil TV series) season 10 =

Bigg Boss
- Season 10
- Season 10 eye logo
- Presented by: Vijay Sethupathi (Week 1-6, 8-present); Ramya Krishnan (Week 7)
- No. of days: 77
- No. of housemates: 24
- No. of episodes: 106

Release
- Original network: Star Vijay; JioHotstar
- Original release: 6 September 2026 – present

Season chronology
- ← Previous; Season 9

Bigg Boss 10, also known as Bigg Boss: Carnivizha is the tenth season of the Indian Tamil-language reality television series Bigg Boss, produced by Banijay. Vijay Sethupathi is returning as a host for the third consecutive year. Ramya Krishnan as special host in week 7 for the second time after fifth season.

== Production ==
=== Development and themes ===
After conclusion of ninth season, in January 2026, Vijay Sethupathi signed an agreement to continue as the host of Bigg Boss Tamil another season. The extension was reported as part of ongoing planning for future seasons of the franchise, maintaining his role as the consistent host across editions.

The season's tagline is “Carnivizha”, symbolising a Carnival like theme and entertainment which also celebrates the ten-year milestone of Bigg Boss Tamil.

=== Eye logo ===
The logo features a red oval shaped eye with an oval shaped tear sized design in the middle covered in full red. Next to the camera pupil it features a number 1 with a fist symbolising strength and the survival of the fittest and the camera pupil symbolising 0 which together shows as 10 which resembles the 10th season.

=== Broadcast ===
Following the release strategy of the previous season, the show streams 24/7 on JioHotstar, with the main daily episode broadcast on Star Vijay, reflecting a digital-first approach. An unseen episode featuring additional footage not included in the one-hour broadcast is aired on Colors Tamil.

=== House ===
The Bigg Boss 10 house, located in EVP Film City, features an earthy inspired theme. A reviewer said "the designers have created a facade that breaks from conventional symmetry, with windows and varied geometric forms, including hexagons, octagons, arches, and angular and radial frames" and "the house features a Mitti Se Juda (connected to the soil) philosophy, with undulating walls, earthy greens and rustic browns inspired by eroded soil and natural landscapes."

- Living area: Features a large central sofa, a round dining table. The large central couch features earthy colours such as green, orange and yellow.
- Kitchen: Features a green kitchen top with green cupboards.
- Bedroom: Contains 7 shared beds, with colourful cotton designs on the walls and Bigg Boss Eye designs are scattered across the room.
- Captain Bedroom: Since the last season, the captain bedroom has stayed and features a king sized bed for the house captain each week.
- Garden/Outdoor area: Features a nature-themed swimming pool, with a foresty entrance and new green lawn with green chairs to relax on.
- Democracy Room: This room is newly added for this season and features a leaders corner and opposition leader corner, each week the house leader will meet the co housemates here to discuss any ongoing issues while the opposition argues his/her point against the house leader.

== Pre-show ==
Ahead of the launch of the tenth season, the makers introduced a digital pre-selection format titled Bigg Boss – The Common Man. The format was officially unveiled through a promotional teaser released on 1 June 2026, by host Vijay Sethupathi.

According to the announcement, The Common Man was designed as a talent-based selection process for commoner contestants before the main season began. Participants were expected to undergo multiple tasks, evaluations and screening rounds to secure a place inside the Bigg Boss Tamil house. The format was reported to be inspired by the Telugu spin-off Bigg Boss Agnipariksha, which previously served as a digital pre-show for selecting non-celebrity contestants in the Telugu version of the franchise.

== Release ==
Latest seasons of Tamil, Malayalam, Telugu, Kannada and Hindi, Bangla editions of Bigg Boss are scheduled to premiere on 6 September 2026. However Bigg Boss Bangla Season 3 Which came back after a decade which has Cricketer Ganguly as the host started one week earlier (August 30). Ahead of the premiere, a promotional video featuring the hosts of all four South Indian editions— Vijay Sethupathi, Mohanlal, Nagarjuna and Kichcha Sudeepa was released.

== Housemates status ==
S.no	Housemates	Day entered	Day exited	Status
1	Ansar	Day 1		
2	Dhanyaa	Day 1		
3	Jason	Day 1		
4	Lakshmi	Day 1	Day 19	Evicted by Housemates
4	Lakshmi	Day 21		
5	Muniyammal	Day 1		
6	Prithvinath	Day 1		
7	Vasan	Day 28		
8	Vinoth	Day 1		
9	Mukesh	Day 1	Day 77	Evicted
10	Shathiga	Day 1	Day 77	Evicted
11	Avinash	Day 1	Day 70	Evicted
12	Muthazhagi	Day 1	Day 70	Evicted
13	Asmitha	Day 1	Day 63	Evicted
14	Akshitha	Day 0		Eliminated on Stage
14	Akshitha	Day 28	Day 63	Evicted
15	Karishma	Day 0		Eliminated on Stage
15	Karishma	Day 28	Day 56	Evicted
16	Shama	Day 1	Day 49	Evicted
17	Chandini	Day 1	Day 42	Evicted
18	Raaghav	Day 1	Day 42	Walked
19	Savinya	Day 1	Day 5	Evicted by Housemates
19	Savinya	Day 21	Day 28	Evicted
20	Javeed	Day 1	Day 12	Evicted by Housemates
20	Javeed	Day 21	Day 28	Evicted by Task
21	Kumaran	Day 1	Day 24	Walked with ₹5 Lakhs
22	Anandhi	Day 8	Day 20	Evicted
23	Manivannan	Day 0		Eliminated on Stage
23	Manivannan	Day 4	Day 14	Evicted
24	Pandi	Day 1	Day 3	Walked

== Housemates ==
The following housemates entered the house in order of entry or phase selection:

=== Celebrities ===
- Lakshmi Priya – Television and film actress, known for her roles in the drama series Mahanadhi and the feature film The Road (2023).
- Shathiga – Film and television actress, recognized for her supporting roles in Tamil films including Aanandham, Kuruvi, Maasilamani, Naan Mahaan Alla (2010) and the serial Kolangal, Bharathi Kannamma 2, Mahanadhi and Pandian Stores 2.
- Prithvinath Balaganesan – Digital content creator and social media personality, known for his comedic skits and short-form videos.
- Javeed Sheriff – Fashion model and aspiring actor in the Tamil entertainment industry.
- Muthazhagi Parveen ( Junaitha Parveen ) – Model, beauty pageant titleholder, and actress. She won the Miss Bangalore 2021 title and appeared in the Tamil film Dorothy.
- Asmitha Neelamegam – Professional makeup artist and former child actress, best known for her role in the action comedy film Sadhu Miranda (2008).
- Avinash Ashok – Actor and dancer who won the reality dance show Dance Jodi Dance Reloaded. His acting credits include soap operas such as Azhagu,Kayal, Magale En Marumagale and Veetuku Veedu Vaasapadi.
- Chandini Tamilarasan – Film actress who made her debut in the romantic drama Siddhu +2 (2010), Thaazhampoo and Rettai Roja a soap opera serial
- Pandi – Film and television actor and comedian, known for his roles in Angadi Theru, Peigal Jaakkirathai, Jilla, Poojai,Thozha and teen drama like Metti Oli, Kolangal and Kana Kaanum Kaalangal
- Kumaran Thangarajan – Television actor and dancer, widely recognized for playing Maran and Kathir in the soap opera Eeramana Rojave and Pandian Stores.
- Vinoth Babu – Stand-up comedian, television presenter, and actor. He won Kalakka Povathu Yaaru? and starred in series including Thendral Vandhu Ennai Thodum and Sundari Neeyum Sundaran Naanum.
- Raaghav Ranganathan – Film and television actor, music composer, and television presenter, known for participating in Jodi Number One (Season 1).
- Dhanyaa Pallath – Television actress and social media influencer, known for her appearance in the web series Resort
- Mukesh MK – Television actor and digital content creator, recognized for his participation in the digital series Naducenter.
- Adavadi Ansar – Stand-up comedian who finished as runner-up on Kalakka Povathu Yaaru? and later appeared in Cooku with Comali (Season 7).
- Savinya Velu – Social media influencer and fashion model.

=== Commoners ===
All commoner contestants were selected through Bigg Boss The Common Man, a digital pre-show audition competition.

- Jason Kaushi – Professional athlete.
- Muniyammal Banumathi – A housewife who is also a YouTuber and content creator.
- Shama M – Corporate office worker and social media influencer.

=== Wildcard entrants ===
==== Commoner ====
- Manivannan Uppiliappan –
- Karishma Sama' –

==== Celebrity ====
- Anandhi Ajay – Actress, known for her role in the film Tharai Thappattai,Gatta Kusthi 2 and soap operas such as Raja Paarvai, Karthigai Pengal and Yamuna.
- Akshitha Ashok –
- Vaikuntha Vasan (TTF Vasan) –

== Twists ==
=== Live housemate selection ===
On the grand premiere, host Vijay Sethupathi announced a new twist which allowed audience to live vote to select the housemate they want to enter the house. A group of possible housemates will enter at the same time and the live audience will vote for who they want to enter in the house, the candidate with the least votes will become ineligible to enter the Bigg Boss House.This live audience voting was not applicable to common man contestants, they were eliminated on the basis of their original votes.

S. no	Housemates	Entered	Exited
1	Lakshmi Shathiga Shabnam	Lakshmi Shathiga	Shabnam
2	Prashanth Prithvinath Javeed	Prithvinath Javeed	Prashanth
3	Muniyammal Jason Manivannan Shama Karishma	Jason Shama Muniyammal	Karishma Manivannan
4	Kavitha Asmitha Muthazhagi	Asmitha Muthazhagi	Kavitha
5	Akshitha Avinash	Avinash	Akshitha
6	Raghunath Vinoth Pandi	Pandi Vinoth	Raghunath
7	Malavika Savinya Chandini	Savinya Chandhini	Malavika
8	Puvi Kumaran Raaghav	Kumaran Raaghav	Puvi
9	Ebin Dhanyaa	Dhanyaa	Ebin
10	Mukesh Ansar Raghav E	Mukesh Ansar	Raghav E

=== Rule break alert ===
On Day 1, Bigg Boss announced that all housemates must strictly follow the house rules. If any rule is broken, a new housemate may enter anytime, while an existing housemate may be evicted.

=== Wildcard entry ===
SNo	Contestant	Category	Day entered	Day exited	Status
1	Manivannan	Commoner	Day 4	Day 14	Evicted
2	Anandhi	Celebrity	Day 8	Day 20	Evicted

=== Leader's exit list ===
Every week, the house leader selects three people for eviction through the “Leader’s Exit List” task. One person is then evicted based on individual votes cast in the confession room.

Week	Leader	Contestants in exit list	Evicted
Week 1	Vinoth	Muniyammal, Dhanyaa, Savinya	Savinya
Week 2	Mukesh	Shama, Asmitha, Javeed	Javeed
Week 3	Avinash	Muthazhagi, Anandhi, Lakshmi	Lakshmi

=== The Turning Point ===
On Day 21, the three previously evicted contestants were given a second chance to re-enter the house. Then each challenged one existing contestant to compete in a Hand-Cuff task. The first contestant to remove their handcuff will be declared unsafe and will be evicted from the house immediately.

S.No	Challenger	Status	Warrior	Status
1	Savinya	Evicted	Asmitha	Saved
2	Javeed	Evicted	Dhanyaa	Saved
3	Lakshmi	Saved	Kumaran	Walked with ₹5 Lakhs

=== Money box ===
Bigg Boss Tamil 10 introduced the Money Box earlier this time. On Day 24, the danger-zone contestants were given a chance to take the Money Box and leave the house. Kumaran accepted ₹5 lakh and walked out.

=== Wildcard entry 2.0 ===
On Day 28, as part of “Th3 Turning Point,” three wildcard contestants entered the house.

SNo	Contestant	Category	Day entered	Day exited	Status
1	TTF Vasan	Celebrity	Day 28		
2	Karishma	Commoner	Day 28	Day 56	Evicted
3	Akshitha	Celebrity	Day 28	Day 63	Evicted

=== Eviction Free Pass ===
Eviction Free Pass holder	Given day	Used day	Saved housemate
Shama M	Day 28	Did not use	-
Jason Kaushi	Day 35	Day 63	Avinash Ashok
TTF Vasan	Day 41	Day 56	Mukesh MK

=== Junior Bigg Boss ===
On Day 64, Introduced the "Junior Bigg Boss" for first time in Bigg Boss franchise history. The usual Bigg Boss voice will reportedly be silent for a few days.

S.No	Contestant	Power given day	Power resign/removed day	Reward	Result
1	Vinoth Babu	Day 64	Day 65	First finalist	Failed
2	Muniyammal Banumathi	Day 65	Day 66	Eviction Free Pass until week 14	Failed
3	Adavadi Ansar	Day 66	Day 68	Eviction Free Pass until week 13	Win

== Guest appearances ==
Week	Day	Guest(s)	Purpose of visit
Week 1	Grand Launch	Kiccha Sudeepa, Mohanlal, Akkineni Nagarjuna	Virtually, to celebrate the simultaneous launch of Bigg Boss in multiple languages
Week 3	Day 21	Lijomol Jose, Arjun Chidambaram, Hari Krishnan, Balaji Tharaneetharan, Master Sai Prithviraj, Bala Murugan	To promote their film Baththa
Week 6	Day 41	Vimal	To provide the eviction free pass to contestant TTF Vasan
Week 6	Day 41	Amit Syngle	To launch the Shade Palette book as a brand ambassador for Asian Paints

== Weekly summary ==
Week 1	Twists	Live audience selection: Host Vijay Sethupathi introduced a launch-night twist where prospective housemates were brought onto the stage in groups. The live audience voted via real-time polls to select who would enter the house. The candidate receiving the lowest number of votes in each group was immediately eliminated on stage and became ineligible to enter the Bigg Boss House.; Split batching: Selected housemates entered the house in sequential batches throughout the grand premiere episode rather than all at once.; Midweek eviction: Housemates were in surprise with the midweek eviction after housemates among themselves had to evict one person from the house without public voting.
Week 1	Live voting selection	Category / Selected housemates / Rejected candidates / Total evaluated; Celebrities / 16 / 9 / 25; Commoners / 3 / 2 / 5; Total / 19 / 11 / 30; S.No / Name / Category / Status / Selection round; 1 / Lakshmi Priya / Celebrity / Selected / Round 1; 2 / Shathiga / Celebrity / Selected / Round 1; 3 / Shabnam / Celebrity / Rejected / Round 1; 4 / Prithivinath / Celebrity / Selected / Round 2; 5 / Javeed Sheriff / Celebrity / Selected / Round 2; 6 / Prashanth / Celebrity / Rejected / Round 2; 7 / Jason Kaushi / Commoner / Selected / Round 3; 8 / Karishma Sama' / Commoner / Rejected / Round 3; 9 / Manivannan Uppiliappan / Commoner / Rejected / Round 3; 10 / Muniyammal Banumathi / Commoner / Selected / Round 3; 11 / Shama M / Commoner / Selected / Round 3; 12 / Muthazhagi Parveen / Celebrity / Selected / Round 4; 13 / Kavitha Moahan / Celebrity / Rejected / Round 4; 14 / Asmitha Neelamegam / Celebrity / Selected / Round 4; 15 / Avinash Ashok / Celebrity / Selected / Round 5; 16 / Akshitha Ashok / Celebrity / Rejected / Round 5; 17 / Pandi / Celebrity / Selected / Round 6; 18 / Raghunath / Celebrity / Rejected / Round 6; 19 / Vinoth Babu / Celebrity / Selected / Round 6; 20 / Chandini Tamilarasan / Celebrity / Selected / Round 7; 21 / Malavika / Celebrity / Rejected / Round 7; 22 / Savinya / Celebrity / Selected / Round 7; 23 / Kumaran Thangarajan / Celebrity / Selected / Round 8; 24 / Puviarasan / Celebrity / Rejected / Round 8; 25 / Raghav / Celebrity / Selected / Round 8; 26 / Dhanyaa Pallath / Celebrity / Selected / Round 9; 27 / Ebin / Celebrity / Rejected / Round 9; 28 / Mukesh / Celebrity / Selected / Round 10; 29 / Ansar / Celebrity / Selected / Round 10; 30 / Raghav / Celebrity / Rejected / Round 10; Overview The total number of contestants evaluated across the launch stage was 30, resulting in 19 selected housemates and 11 rejected candidates.
Week 1	Final entrances	On Day 1, a total of 16 housemates entered the Bigg Boss house following the live audience selection rounds. The original entrants were Lakshmi Priya, Shatiga, Prithvinath, Javeed Sheriff, Jason Kaushi, Muniyammal Banumathi, Shama M, Muthazhagi, Asmitha Neelamegam, Avinash Ashok, Pandi, Vinoth Babu, Chandini Tamilarasan, Savinya, Kumaran Thangarajan, Raghav, Dhanyaa, Mukesh, and Ansar entered the house.; Among the Day 1 entrants, Jason Kaushi, Muniyammal Banumathi, and Shama M entered as commoner housemates selected via Bigg Boss The Common Man.; On Day 4, Manivannan Uppiliappan entered the house as the first wildcard entrant.; Cleaning Department Head - Lakshmi Priya Cooking Department Head - Shathiga
Week 1	Nominations	No nominations
Week 1	House leader	~~Shathiga~~ Vinoth Babu
Week 1	Opposition leader	~~Vinoth Babu~~ Jason Kaushi
Week 1	Tasks	Night Stars task: On Day 1: All housemates are given a chance, to entertain and give content to audience watching 24/7 live on Jio Hotstar throughout the night. 2 housemates will be allocated this task every night throughout the week.
Week 1	Tasks	Leadership task (Jananayagam): On Day 1: Housemates will gather to nominate 5 housemates who are eligible to participate in the leadership task. The 5 are Jason, Muthazhagi, Shama, Shatiga and Vinoth. However the 2nd stage housemates are only allowed to shortlist 3 housemates out of the 5 by voting for them. After the voting Shama, Shatiga and Vinoth were qualified for the role. After the 2nd task Shatiga won and emerged as the 1st week leader.
Week 1	Tasks	Asura Pasi: On Day 2: In the garden area there will be a big demon mascot with his mouth opening and closing, housemates will need to stand on a spring board and take a chicken leg piece doll and throw it in the demons mouth, each spring board has a different value. The amount earned at the end of the task will be used for luxury budget shopping.
Week 1	Tasks	Midweek eviction 1: On Day 5, Bigg Boss announced at the start of the week that the house leader will get to select 3 housemates who have not performed well in the Night Stars Task. On that day, Vinoth was the house leader and he selected Dhanyaa, Muniyammal and Savinya as the least performers eligible for eviction. Housemates will vote for the housemate they want to evict. Savinya received the highest votes to be evicted among the housemates and got evicted.
Week 1	Sponsors	NIL
Week 1	Walked	On Day 3, Black Pandi walked out of the Bigg Boss house after a health issue warning.
Week 1	Exit	On Day 5, Savinya Velu was evicted after the majority of housemates voted her out.
Week 2
Week 2	Entrances	On Day 8, Anandhi Ajay entered the house as the second wild card housemate.
Week 2	Twists	
Week 2	Nominations	On Day 8: Asmitha, Avinash, Kumaran, Lakshmi, Manivanan, Prithvi, Javeed, Vinoth, Chandini and Jason were nominated for eviction in the second week.
Week 2	House leader	~~Shama M~~ Mukesh MK
Week 2	Opposition Leader	~~Adavadi Ansar~~ Avinash Ashok
Week 2	Tasks	Leadership task (Eduthan Sutan): On Day 8: Each housemate will be given a paintball gun and will be given three chances to shot at the target, housemates who aim on various different value of the targets each time will need to be added up in the end, each housemate who collects their points can award their points to a leadership candidate of their wish on who they desire to become the leader of the week. However, if housemates dislike a candidate of they can shoot on the target board which has minus point values and subtract the existing points of a nominees board. The leadership nominees were Ansar, Shama and Vinoth. Shama received the highest points and was appointed as the house leader for week 2.; Ansar : 245 points Shama : 280 points (winner) Vinoth : -35 points
Week 2	Tasks	Knockout zone: On Day 9: In the Bigg Boss house, there are 18 coins scattered around the house. Once the buzzer goes off all the housemates will need to find the knock out coins that are hidden. When a housemate finds a coin they will have to tear the image of an housemate they wish to not continue in the task. The final housemate who lasts the longest without getting knock out will win a nomination free pass for the third week. Mukesh won the task and was hence granted nomination free in week 3.
Week 2	Tasks	Oru Kaathai Solatumaa: From Day 9-12: Throughout the week, the house leader Shama will nominate four housemates each day to tell their personal life stories, struggles, strengths, pros and cons to the rest of the housemates. Each housemate will be granted 20 minutes to share their stories. In the given 20 minutes housemates whose stories are entertaining and worth to be heard, they will succeed. However, if any housemates feel someone's story is boring they can push a lever and stop them from continuing their story. At the end of the task, which housemate's story is considered the 'worst' and most boring will be potentially evicted from the Bigg Boss house.; Day 9: Asmitha, Jason, Lakshmi and Kumaran shared their stories. Day 10: Ansar, Javeed, Muthazhagi and Shathiga shared their stories. Cleaning Department Head - Lakshmi Priya Cooking Department Head - Muthazhagi
Week 2	Tasks	Cheese House Task: On Day 10: Bigg Boss set-up a cheese house in the garden area, in the cheese house for the 19 housemates there are only 18 holes, and all the housemates will need to run inside the cheese house once the music stops playing and need to put their head inside the hole to secure their spot, the housemate who does not receive a spot will be eliminated and every time a housemate is eliminated from the task, two holes will be covered. The final housemate who wins the task will win a nomination-free pass in week 3 nomination. Prithvinath won the task and received a nomination free-pass in the third week nomination.
Week 2	Tasks	Midweek eviction 2: On Day 12, Bigg Boss announced at the start of the week that the house leader will get to select three housemates who have not performed well in the Oru Kaathai Solatumaa. On that day, Shama was the house leader and he selected Asmitha, Jason and Javeed as the least performers eligible for eviction. Housemates will vote for the housemate they want to evict. Javeed received the highest votes to be evicted among the housemates and was evicted.
Week 2	Sponsors	
Week 2	Exit	On Day 12, Javeed Sheriff was evicted after the majority of housemates voted him out.
Week 2	Exit	On Day 14, Manivannan Uppiliappan was evicted after facing public votes.
Week 3	Twists	None
Week 3	Nominations	* On Day 8: Anandhi, Ansar, Chandini, Dhanyaa, Lakshmi, Muniyammal, Raaghav and Shama were nominated for eviction in the Third week.
Week 3	House leader	Avinash Ashok
Week 3	Opposition Leader	Raaghav Ranganathan
Week 3	Tasks	Midweek eviction 3: On Day 19, Bigg Boss announced at the start of the week that the house leader will get to select three housemates who have not performed well in the entire week. On that day, Avinash was the house leader and he selected Ananthi, Muthazhagi and Lakshmi Priya as the least performers eligible for eviction. Housemates will vote for the housemate they want to evict. Lakshmi Priya received the highest votes to be evicted among the housemates and was evicted.; Cleaning Department Head - Raaghav; Cooking Department Head - Ansar
Week 3	Sponsors	
Week 3	Exit	On Day 19, Lakshmi Priya was evicted after the majority of housemates voted her out.
Week 3	Exit	On Day 20, Anandhi Ajay was evicted after facing public votes.
Week 4	Entrances	On Day 21, Javeed, Lakshmi Priya and Savinya re-entered the house
Week 4	Nominations	On Day 22: Asmitha, Dhanyaa, Javeed, Kumaran, Lakshmi and Savinya were nominated for eviction in the fourth week as part of the Th3 Turning Point twist.
Week 4	House leader	None ( Shama (Day 22–24) & Lakshmi Priya (Day 25–26) as Manager of BB Hotel Task )
Week 4	Guest Role	Dhanyaa, Javeed, Kumaran, Lakshmi, Asmitha, Savinya (Day 22–24); Except Dhanyaa, Javeed, Lakshmi, Asmitha & Savinya (Day 25–26)
Week 4	Tasks	No Cooking & Cleaning Department Head BB Hotel Head - Shama Bb Hotel 2.0 - Lakshmi Th3 Turning Point: On Day 21, the three previously evicted contestants were given a second chance to re-enter the house. Then each challenged one existing contestant to compete in a Hand-Cuff task. The first contestant to remove their handcuff will be declared unsafe and will be evicted from the house immediately.; S.No / Challenger / Status / Warrior / Status; 1 / Savinya / Evicted / Asmitha / Saved; 2 / Javeed / Evicted / Dhanyaa / Saved; 3 / Lakshmi / Saved / Kumaran / Walked with ₹5 Lakhs
Week 4	Tasks	Bigg Boss Hotel: On Day 22: The Bigg Boss house became a hotel where all the housemates are hotel workers, however the six housemates who are hand-cuffed are the guests of the hotel. Each housemate will have to serve and treat the six housemates with luxury.; On Day 22: Nobody desired to cut the handcuff; On Day 23: Nobody desired to cut the handcuf; On Day 24: Kumaran walked with ₹5 Lakhs and removed the handcuff; On Day 25: Nobody desired to cut the handcuff; On Day 26: Nobody desired to cut the handcuff
Week 4	Tasks	Cash Prize Self Eviction: On Day 24: Bigg Boss gave the six housemates who were handcuffed an opportunity to self-evict themselves with a cash prize of 5 Lakh and immediately left the house.; On Day 25, Guests with turn into Staffs and Staffs with turn into Guests; Staffs - Javeed,Dhanyaa,Lakshmi,Asmitha and Savinya; Guests - Other 12 contestant; Ending of Turning Point task; : Out of any two players, one player must be eliminated. Both the players should decide and eliminate the person; Lakshmi Priya & Kumaran - Kumaran Walked; Dhanyaa & Javeed - Javeed Evicted; Asmitha & Savinya - Savinya Evicted
Week 4	Sponsors	
Week 4	Walked	On Day 24, Kumaran Thangarajan walked out of the Bigg Boss house with 5 lakhs cash prize after removing handcuff.
Week 4	Exit	On Day 28, Savinya Velu was evicted after facing public votes and Javeed Sheriff evicted by task.
Week 5	Twists	
Week 5	Nominations	On Day 29 : Avinash, Chandini, Dhanyaa, Jason, Lakshmi, Muniyammal, Muthazhagi, Raaghav and Shama were nominated for eviction in the fifth week.
Week 5	House leader	Akshitha Ashok
Week 5	Opposition Leader	Muniyammal Banumathi
Week 5	Tasks	Leadership task: On Day 29: The wildcard housemates Akshitha Ashok, Karishma Sama' and Vaikuntha Vasan were nominated for leadership.; The task is, all three candidates will have a basket in front of them while their co housemates will have to bag and trying to catch all the balls that are thrown from above the Bigg Boss house and collect as much of balls as they can place it in the box of the candidate they wish should become the leader of the week.; Akshitha Ashok received the highest number of balls from her co-housemates and became the captain of the week.; Cleaning Department Head - Prithvinath; Cooking Department Head - Lakshmi Priya
Week 5	Tasks	Magic Potion task: On Day 29-33: all housemates had to get into a pair with another housemate and collect blocks from the machine that will supply blocks to the house.; All housemates need to create a certain key pattern to unlock a magic potion to end a life from another team, each team will be given ten lives and once all their lives are out they will be eliminated.; The final team standing will win a nomination free pass in week 6.; 1st Place - Muniyammal Banumathi and Muthazhagi Parveen; 2nd Place - Lakshmi Priya and Raaghav Ranganathan; 3rd Place - Prithvinath Balaganesan and Asmitha Neelamegam; 4th Place - Avinash Ashok and Akshitha Ashok; 5th Place - Shama M and Vinoth Babu; 6th Place - Adavadi Ansar and Shathiga (Walked from the task); 7th Place - Jason Kaushi and Mukesh; 8th Place - Chandini Tamilarasan and TTF Vasan; 9th Place - Karishma Sama' and Dhanyaa Pallath
Week 5	Sponsors	
Week 5	Exit	No eviction
Week 6	Twists	
Week 6	Nominations	On Day 36 : Akshitha, Avinash, Chandini, Shathiga, Mukesh, Vaikuntha Vasan, Karishma and Shama were nominated for eviction in the sixth week.
Week 6	House leader	Adavadi Ansar
Week 6	Opposition Leader	Muthazhagi Parveen
Week 6	Tasks	Leadership task: On Day 36, The nominated housemates Adavadi Ansar, Muniyammal Banumathi and Muthazhagi Parveen were nominated for leadership. Adavadi Ansar received the highest number of points from his co housemates and became the captain of the week.; Cleaning Department Head - Asmitha Neelamegam; Cooking Department Head - Raaghav Ranganathan; Muniyammal Banumathi and Muthazhagi Parveen has got nomination free pass due to win of Magic Portion Task; Diamond Heist Task; One real diamond and one fake diamond is placed inside the Bigg Boss house. The contestants compete to steal the diamond and hide it without being caught until the weekend. Contestants can play individually or form teams. If someone is caught stealing the diamond, they risk being sent to jail. Eventually, TTF Vasan and Karishma ended up stealing a real and fake diamond respectively.: Jodi 1 - Jason Kaushi & Chandini Tamilarasan; Jodi 2 - Prithvinath Balaganesan & Shama M; Jodi 3 - Akshitha Ashok & Mukesh; Jodi 4 - TTF Vasan & Muniyammal Banumathi; Jodi 5 - Shathiga & Muthazhagi Parveen; Jodi 6 - Karishma Sama' & Adavadi Ansar; Jodi 7 - Lakshmi Priya & Vinoth Babu; Jodi 8 - Dhanyaa Pallath & Avinash Ashok; Jodi 9 - Asmitha Neelamegam & Raaghav Ranganathan
Week 6	Sponsors	
Week 6	Walked	On Day 42, Raaghav Ranganathan walked out of the Bigg Boss house due to a surgery.
Week 6	Exit	On Day 42, Chandini Tamilarasan was evicted after facing public votes.
Week 7	Twists	Ramya Krishnan will be the special host for week 7.
Week 7	Nominations	On Day 43 : Akshitha, Ansar, Asmitha, Jason, Lakshmi, Muthazhagi, Prithvinath, Shama & Vaikuntha Vasan were nominated for eviction in the seventh week.
Week 7	Red House	~~Avinash Ashok~~ Prithvinath Balaganesan
Week 7	Blue House	Vinoth Babu
Week 7	Tasks	Red team vs Blue team (Survival task): From Day 43–47, The housemates were separated into two teams, Red and Blue. Housemates were able to pick their own teams and leaders.; Then, Housemates were told that they could be able to remove the opposite team's access to three things; Kitchen,Bedroom and Personal belongings.; Housemates played a total of eight tasks in the time being. Seven tasks were won by the blue team, leading victory to the majority number of wins.; Blue team removed the access to all three things for their opposite team.; Blue Team Members; Vinoth Babu (Leader); Adavadi Ansar; Lakshmi Priya; Dhanyaa Pallath; Shathiga; Asmitha Neelamegam; Mukesh; Shama; Red Team Members; Prithvinath Balaganesan (Leader); Avinash Ashok ~~(Leader)~~; Vaikuntha Vasan; Karishma Sama'; Muthazhagi Parveen; Akshitha Ashok; Muniyammal Banumathi; Both Teams (Red and Blue); Jason Kaushi; Overall Winner of the Task : Blue Team
Week 7	Sponsors	
Week 7	Exit	On Day 49, Shama M was evicted after facing public votes.
Week 8	Twists	
Week 8	Nominations	On Day 50 : Akshitha, Asmitha, Ansar, Avinash, Dhanyaa, Jason, Lakshmi, Karishma, Mukesh, Muniyammal, Muthazhagi, Prithvinath, Shathiga, Vasan and Vinoth were nominated for eviction in the eighth week.
Week 8	Quick Gun Cowboys	Adavadi Ansar
Week 8	Mining Mafia	Vinoth Babu
Week 8	Tasks	Mining Mafia VS Quick Gun Cowboys Quick Gun Cowboys • Adavadi Ansar • Mukesh • Avinash Ashok • Muthazhagi Parveen • Lakshmi Priya • Shathiga • Vaikuntha Vasan Mining Mafia • Vinoth Babu • Prithvinath Balaganesan • Muniyammal Banumathi • Asmitha Neelamegam • Akshitha Ashok • Jason Kaushi • Dhanyaa Pallath • Karishma Sama': Overall Winner: Quick Gun Cowboys 7–1
Week 8	Sponsors	Darling & Indian Gate
Week 8	Exit	On Day 56, Karishma Sama' was evicted after facing public votes.
Week 9	Twists	
Week 9	Nominations	On Day 57 : Akshitha, Avinash, Asmitha, Jason, Muniyammal, Muthazhagi, Prithvinath and Vinoth were nominated for eviction in the ninth week.
Week 9	House leader	Lakshmi Priya
Week 9	Opposition Leader	None
Week 9	Tasks	BB THE GREAT THIRUDUNGADA ACADEMY • Asmitha - Rules Dhanam Principal • Vinoth Babu - Sigamani • Dhanyaa - Teacher Ingavai • Shathiga - Warden 1 Angavai • Muthazhagi - Warden 2 Kadambari • Akshitha - Chandramathi • Prithvinath - Appavi Arumugam • Avinash - Butti Balu • Jason - Jamindar Jambuligam • Muniyammal - Josiyam Jyothilakshmi • Ansar - Pathiram Palaniswamy • Lakshmi- Sandhega Shanthi • Vasan - Mafia Manick • Mukesh - Quater Gundumani Killers - Asmitha & Jason Detective - Vasan : Detective's Suspects - Prithvinath & Muniyammal
Week 9	Sponsors	
Week 9	Exit	On Day 63, Akshitha Ashok and Asmitha Neelamegam were evicted in double eviction after facing public votes.
Week 10	Twists	Junior Bigg Boss: First time in Bigg Boss history, introduced the Junior Bigg Boss. The usual Bigg Boss voice will reportedly be silent for a few days.
Week 10	Nominations	On Day 64 : Avinash, Dhanyaa, Mukesh, Muthazhagi, Lakshmi, Muniyammal and Vasan were nominated for eviction in the tenth week
Week 10	Junior Bigg Boss	V̶i̶n~~oth Babu~~ ~~Muniyammal Banumathi~~ Adavadi Ansar
Week 10	House leader	Jason Kaushi
Week 10	Opposition Leader	None
Week 10	Tasks	
Week 10	Sponsors	
Week 10	Exit	On Day 70, Avinash Ashok and Muthazhagi Parveen were evicted in double eviction after facing public votes.
Week 11	Twists	
Week 11	Nominations	On Day 71 : Lakshmi, Shathiga, Jason, Mukesh, Muniyammal, Prithvinath and Vasan were nominated for eviction in the eleventh week.
Week 11	House leader	Dhanyaa Pallath
Week 11	Opposition Leader	None
Week 11	Tasks	
Week 11	Sponsors	
Week 11	Exit	On Day 77, Mukesh MK and Shathiga were evicted in double eviction after facing public votes.
Week 12	Twists	
Week 12	Nominations	
Week 12	House leader	
Week 12	Opposition Leader	
Week 12	Tasks	
Week 12	Sponsors	
Week 12	Exit	
Week 13	Twists	
Week 13	Nominations	
Week 13	House leader	
Week 13	Opposition Leader	
Week 13	Tasks	
Week 13	Sponsors	
Week 13	Exit	
Week 14	Twists	
Week 14	Nominations	
Week 14	House leader	
Week 14	Opposition Leader	
Week 14	Tasks	
Week 14	Sponsors	
Week 14	Exit	
Week 15 Finale Week	Twists	
Week 15 Finale Week	Nominations	
Week 15 Finale Week	House leader	
Week 15 Finale Week	Opposition Leader	
Week 15 Finale Week	Tasks	
Week 15 Finale Week	Sponsors	
Week 15 Finale Week	Exit	
Week 15 Finale Week	Day 105 Grand Finale	
Week 15 Finale Week	4th Runner-up	
Week 15 Finale Week	3rd Runner-up	
Week 15 Finale Week	2nd Runner-up	
Week 15 Finale Week	1st Runner-up	
Week 15 Finale Week	Winner	

== Nominations table ==
BBS10	Week 1				Week 2		Week 3		Week 4				Week 5	Week 6	Week 7	Week 8	Week 9	Week 10	Week 11	Week 12	Week 13	Week 14	Week 15	
BBS10	Grand Premiere		Day 1	Day 5	Day 8	Day 12	Day 15	Day 19	Day 21	Day 22–28	Day 24	Day 28	Week 5	Week 6	Week 7	Week 8	Week 9	Week 10	Week 11	Week 12	Week 13	Week 14	Day 104	Grand Finale Day 105
Nominees for House Leader	None		~~Jason~~; ~~Muthazhagi~~; Shama; Shathiga; Vinoth	Prithvinath; Vinoth	Ansar; ~~Dhanyaa~~; Shama; Vinoth	Avinash; Mukesh	~~Anandhi~~; Avinash; ~~Jason~~; Mukesh; ~~Shama~~; Vinoth		None				Akshitha; Karishma; Vasan	Ansar; Muniyammal; Muthazhagi	None		Ansar; Mukesh; Lakshmi	Jason; Muthazhagi; Shathiga	Dhanyaa; Mukesh; Prithvinath				None	
House Leader	None		~~Shathiga~~	Vinoth	~~Shama~~	Mukesh	Avinash		None				Akshitha	Ansar	None		Lakshmi	Jason	Dhanyaa				None	
Leader's Nominations	None		No nominations	Savinya	Javeed; Kumaran	Javeed	Anandhi; Chandini		None				Dhanyaa; Ansar	Karishma; Avinash	None		Muniyammal; Akshitha	Muniyammal; Muthazhagi	Prithvinath; Shathiga				None	
Opposition Leader	None		~~Vinoth~~	Jason	~~Ansar~~	Avinash	Raaghav		None				Muniyammal	Muthazhagi	None								None	
Opposition Leader's nominations	None		No; Nominations	Muniyammal	Shathiga; Prithvinath	Javeed	Anandhi; Ansar		None				Avinash; Lakshmi	Karishma; Vasan	None								None	
Weak performer(s) (BB Prison)	Muniyammal; Asmitha				Muniyammal; Anandhi		None						Vasan; Karishma	Muniyammal	None	Dhanyaa; Karishma	Vasan; Dhanyaa	None	Ansar; Jason					
Vote to:	Live selection	None		Evict					Re-entered	Th3 Turning Point	Cash Price eviction	Wildcard entry	Evict											WIN
Ansar	Selected	Entered	No nominations	Savinya	~~Opposition~~; ~~Leader~~	Asmitha	Anandhi; Shama	Lakshmi	Not eligible				Dhanyaa; Asmitha	House; Leader	Muthazhagi; Akshitha	Prithvinath; Asmitha	Muthazhagi; Prithvinath	Lakshmi; Muthazhagi	Jason; Mukesh					
Ansar	Selected	Entered	No nominations	Savinya	~~Opposition~~; ~~Leader~~	Asmitha	Anandhi; Shama	Lakshmi	Not eligible				Dhanyaa; Asmitha	House; Leader	Muthazhagi; Akshitha	Prithvinath; Asmitha	Muthazhagi; Prithvinath	Junior Bigg Boss	Jason; Mukesh					
Dhanyaa	Selected	Entered	No nominations	Savinya	Vinoth; Jason	Javeed	Kumaran; Shama	Anandhi	Not; Eligible	Vulnerable	Rejected cash prize	Not eligible	Muthazhagi; Jason	Vasan; Chandini	Muthazhagi; Akshitha	Ansar; Lakshmi	Akshitha; Avinash	Avinash; Mukesh	House; Leader					
Jason	Selected	Entered	No nominations	Opposition; Leader	Kumaran; Prithvinath	Asmitha	Lakshmi; Shathiga	Anandhi	Not eligible				Dhanyaa; Shama	Shama; Vinoth	Shama; Asmitha	Vinoth; Avinash	Asmitha; Vinoth	House; Leader	Vinoth; Lakshmi					
Lakshmi	Selected	Entered	No nominations	Savinya	Kumaran; Chandini	Javeed	Anandhi; Muniyammal	Evicted by Housemates (Day 19)	Re-Entered (Day 21)	~~Vulnerable~~	Rejected cash prize	Not eligible	Dhanyaa; Muniyammal	Mukesh; Karishma	Vasan; Jason	Vinoth; Dhanyaa	House; Leader	Vasan; Muniyammal	Mukesh; Shathiga					
Muniyammal	Selected	Entered	No nominations	Savinya	Asmitha; Avinash	Javeed	Anandhi; Lakshmi	Muthazhagi	Not eligible				Opposition; Leader	Karishma; Vasan	Lakshmi; Vasan	Shathiga; Asmitha	Akshitha; Jason	Dhanyaa; Lakshmi	Lakshmi; Shathiga					
Muniyammal	Selected	Entered	No nominations	Savinya	Asmitha; Avinash	Javeed	Anandhi; Lakshmi	Muthazhagi	Not eligible				Opposition; Leader	Karishma; Vasan	Lakshmi; Vasan	Shathiga; Asmitha	Akshitha; Jason	~~Junior Bigg Boss~~	Lakshmi; Shathiga					
Prithvinath	Selected	Entered	No nominations	Savinya	Dhanyaa; Avinash	Javeed	Muniyammal; Ananthi	Anandhi	Not eligible				Raaghav; Shama	Karishma; Vasan	Lakshmi; Asmitha	Akshitha; Vasan	Muthazhagi; Avinash	Muthazhagi; Vasan	Muniyammal; Vasan					
Vasan	Not in House											Entered (Day 28)	Chandini; Prithvinath	Shama; Akshitha	Shama; Muthazhagi	Jason; Avinash	Muniyammal; Avinash	Avinash; Muniyammal	Jason; Shathiga					
Vinoth	Selected	Entered	~~Opposition~~; ~~Leader~~	House; Leader	Avinash; Prithvinath	Asmitha	Anandhi; Dhanyaa	Lakshmi	Not eligible				Lakshmi; Shama	Jason; Karishma	Muthazhagi; Prithvinath	Jason; Muniyammal	Shathiga; Jason	~~Junior Bigg Boss~~	Prithvinath; Mukesh					
Mukesh	Selected	Entered	No nominations	Savinya	Chandini; Kumaran	House; Leader	Shama; Chandini	Lakshmi	Not eligible				Shama; Chandini	Karishma; Vasan	Muthazhagi; Vasan	Vasan; Prithvinath	Asmitha; Muniyammal	Lakshmi; Muthazhagi	Prithvinath; Jason	Evicted (Day 77)				
Shathiga	Selected	Entered	~~House~~; ~~Leader~~	Savinya	Manivannan; Javeed	Asmitha	Anandhi; Dhanyaa	Anandhi	Not eligible				Dhanyaa; Shama	Karishma; Vasan	Muthazhagi; Prithvinath	Muthazhagi; Karishma	Avinash; Muniyammal	Dhanyaa; Muthazhagi	Muniyammal; Vasan	Evicted (Day 77)				
Muthazhagi	Selected	Entered	No nominations	Savinya	Avinash; Asmitha	Asmitha	Ananthi; Dhanyaa	Nominated	Not eligible				Lakshmi; Raaghav	Opposition; Leader	Asmitha; Vasan	Mukesh; Lakshmi	Vinoth; Mukesh	Prithvinath; Mukesh	Evicted (Day 70)					
Avinash	Selected	Entered	No nominations	Savinya	Kumaran; Chandini	Opposition; Leader	House; Leader	Lakshmi	Not; Eligible				Muniyammal; Lakshmi	Karishma; Vasan	Ansar; Shathiga	Karishma; Shathiga	Asmitha; Prithvinath	Vasan; Dhanyaa	Evicted (Day 70)					
Asmitha	Selected	Entered	No nominations	Savinya	Jason; Vinoth	Nominated	Ansar; Mukesh	Lakshmi	Not eligible	Vulnerable	Rejected cash prize	Not eligible	Muthazhagi; Chandini	Karishma; Vasan	Muthazhagi; Dhanyaa	Muthazhagi; Muniyammal	Muthazhagi; Akshitha	Evicted (Day 63)						
Akshitha	Not Selected	Evicted (Day 0)										Entered (Day 28)	House; Leader	Karishma; Vasan	Lakshmi; Ansar	Ansar; Dhanyaa	Muniyammal; Muthazhagi	Evicted (Day 63)						
Karishma	Not Selected	Evicted (Day 0)										Entered (Day 28)	Avinash; Chandini	Akshitha; Chandini	Muthazhagi; Prithvinath	Mukesh; Akshitha	Evicted (Day 56)							
Shama	Selected	Entered	No nominations	Muniyammal	~~House~~; ~~Leader~~	Nominated	Jason; Ansar	Lakshmi	Not eligible				Mukesh; Chandini	Mukesh; Shathiga	Jason; Muthazhagi	Evicted (Day 49)								
Chandini	Selected	Entered	No nominations	Dhanyaa	Manivannan; Ansar	Javeed	Lakshmi; Dhanyaa	Muthazhagi	Not eligible				Shama; Lakshmi	Karishma; Avinash	Evicted (Day 42)									
Raaghav	Selected	Entered	No nominations	Savinya	Mukesh; Manivannan	Shama	Opposition; Leader	Muthazhagi	Not eligible				Jason; Muthazhagi	Vasan; Shathiga	Walked (Day 42)									
Javeed	Selected	Entered	No nominations	Muniyammal	Kumaran; Asmitha	Nominated	Evicted by Housemates (Day 12)		Re-Entered (Day 21)	Vulnerable	Rejected cash prize	Evicted By Task (Day 28)												
Savinya	Selected	Entered	No nominations	Dhanyaa	Evicted by Housemates (Day 5)				Re-Entered (Day 21)	Vulnerable	Rejected cash prize	Evicted (Day 28)												
Kumaran	Selected	Entered	No nominations	Savinya	Avinash; Prithvinath	Shama	Anandhi; Lakshmi	Lakshmi	Not eligible	~~Vulnerable~~	Accepted cash prize (₹5,00,000)	Walked out with cash prize (Day 24)												
Anandhi	Not in House			Entered (Day 8)	Muthazhagi; Kumaran	Shama	Dhanyaa; Lakshmi	Nominated	Evicted (Day 20)															
Manivannan	Not Selected	Evicted (Day 0)	Entered (Day 4)	Savinya	Kumaran; Raaghav R	Javeed	Evicted (Day 14)																	
Pandi	Selected	Entered	No nominations	Walked (Day 3)																				
Notes	1	2		3, 4	5, 8	6, 7		9	10, 11, 12, 13, 14, 15				16, 17	18, 19, 20, 21, 22, 23		24								
Against Public Vote	None			Dhanyaa; Muniyammal; Savinya	Asmitha; Avinash; Chandini; Jason; ~~Javeed~~; Kumaran; Lakshmi; Manivannan; Prithvinath; Vinoth	Asmitha; Javeed; Shama	Anandhi; Ansar; Chandini; Dhanyaa; ~~Lakshmi~~; Muniyammal; Raaghav; Shama	Anandhi; Lakshmi; Muthazhagi	Asmitha; Dhanyaa; Javeed; ~~Kumaran~~; Lakshmi; Savinya				Avinash; Chandini; Dhanyaa; Jason; Lakshmi; Muniyammal; Muthazhagi; Raaghav; Shama	Akshitha; Avinash; Chandini; Karishma; Mukesh; Shathiga; Shama; Vasan	Akshitha; Ansar; Asmitha; Jason; Lakshmi; Prithvinath; Muthazhagi; Shama; Vasan	Akshitha; Ansar; Asmitha; Avinash; Dhanyaa; Jason; Karishma; Lakshmi; Mukesh; Muniyammal; Muthazhagi; Prithvinath; Shathiga; Vasan; Vinoth	Akshitha; Asmitha; Avinash; Jason; Muniyammal; Muthazhagi; Prithvinath; Vinoth	Avinash; Dhanyaa; Lakshmi; Mukesh; Muniyammal; Muthazhagi; Vasan	Jason; Lakshmi; Mukesh; Muniyammal; Prithvinath; Shathiga; Vasan					
Re-entered	None								Javeed	None														
Re-entered	None								Lakshmi	None														
Re-entered	None								Savinya	None														
Ejected	None																							
Walked	Pandi				None				Kumaran				None	Raaghav	None									
Evicted	None			Savinya	Manivannan	Javeed	Anandhi	Lakshmi	Javeed				No eviction	Chandini	Shama	Karishma	Akshitha	Avinash	Shathiga					
Evicted	None			Savinya	Manivannan	Javeed	Anandhi	Lakshmi	Savinya				No eviction	Chandini	Shama	Karishma	Asmitha	Muthazhagi	Mukesh					

Notes

indicates the House Leader.
indicates the Opposition Leader.
indicates that the candidate was selected by live audience vote to enter the house.
indicates that the candidate was rejected on-stage or evicted from the house.
indicates the contestant walked out due to emergency.
indicates the contestant has been ejected.
indicates that the housemate was directly nominated for eviction prior to regular nominations.
indicates that housemate was evicted by other housemates' votes.
indicates that the housemate was granted immunity.
indicates the contestant has used on/given an eviction free pass.
indicates the contestant as Weak Performer of the week.
indicates the winner.
indicates the first runner-up.
indicates the second runner-up.
indicates the third runner-up.
indicates the fourth runner-up.
indicates the contestant has re-entered the house.
indicates the Junior Bigg Boss.

=== Nomination notes ===
- ^1: On Grand Premiere (Day 0), host Vijay Sethupathi introduced 30 applicants in 10 different selection groups. The live audience voted in real time to determine who earned entry into the main house. 11 candidates received the lowest votes in their respective rounds and were rejected on stage before entering the house.
- ^2: On Day 1, all 19 selected housemates officially entered the Bigg Boss House. Among them, Jason Kaushi, Muniyammal, and Shama M represented the commoner category chosen through Bigg Boss The Common Man.
- ^3: On Day 5, Shathiga stepped down as house leader due to personal reasons, the whole house later voted for Vinoth to assume role of house leader from opposition leader.
- ^4: On Day 5, Dhanyaa, Muniyammal and Savinya were nominated by house leader under the Leader's exit list nominees, Housemates voted for Savinya Velu to be evicted.
- ^5: In week 1, Lakshmi was the performer nominated by the housemates who did not perform well in the Night Stars Task and was directly nominated for week 2 eviction process.
- ^6: In week 2, Mukesh won the Knockout Zone task and hence was granted immunity from the week 3 nomination.
- ^7: In week 2, Prithvinath won the Cheese Houser Task task and hence was granted immunity from the week 3 nomination.
- ^8: On Day 12, Asmitha, Javeed and Shama were nominated by house leader under the Leader's exit list nominees, Housemates voted for Javeed Sheriff to be evicted.
- ^9: On Day 19, Anandhi, Muthazhagi and Lakshmi Priya were nominated by the house leader Avinash, Under the Leaders exit list nominees . Housemates voted to Lakshmi Priya to be eliminated
- ^10: On Day 22,: Asmitha, Dhanyaa, Javeed, Kumaran, Lakshmi and Savinya were categorised as Vulnerable for eviction in the fourth week as part of the Th3 Turning Point twist.
- ^11: On Day 24: Kumaran walked with 5 lakhs and got eliminated from the show
- ^12: On Day 28: Javeed Sheriff was evicted because he took of his handcuff in the swimming pool and hence Vijay Sethupathi evicted him.
- ^13: On Day 28: Dhanya Pallath was saved and Asmitha and Savinya couldn't decide who to evict and hence public votes was considered and Savinya Velu was evicted.
- ^14: On Day 28: Shama M received an Eviction Free Pass from Asmitha Neelamgam, Savinya Velu, Javeed Sheriff, Lakshmi Priya and Dhanya Pallath in form of guests
- ^15: On Day 28: 3 Wildcards were sent inside as the Turning Point and They were TTF Vasan, Akshitha Ashok and Karishma Sama entered the BB House
- ^16: On Day 34: A Kurumpadam was shown to the Housemates because of the conversation of Shama M and Lakshmi Priya
- ^17: On Day 35 Official BB Department chose Jason Kaushi for an Eviction Free Pass
- ^18: Since Muniyammal and Muthazhagi won the magic potion task in week 5 she was given a nomination free in the week 6 nomination.
- ^19: At the end of Diamond Heist Task TTF Vasan had the Real Diamond in the bathroom vent. And hence he has received an Eviction Free Pass on Day 41
- ^20:The Fake Diamond was with Karishma Sama in the Democracy Room.
- ^21: On Day 41, Two Kurupadam was shown to Housemates because of TTF Vasan's Gameplay in week 6
- ^22: On Day 41, One Kurupadam was shown to the Housemates because of Karishma Sama's Gameplay in Week 6
- ^23: On Day 42, Raaghav Ranganathan walked due to a surgery
- ^24: On Day 56, Vasan used his Eviction Free Pass and saved Mukesh from eviction.
