= Maya S. Krishnan =

Indian actress

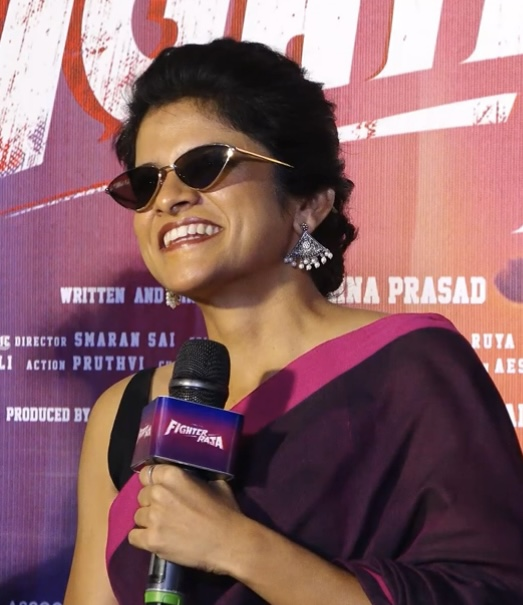
- Maya in 2024
- Born: Madurai, Tamil Nadu, India
- Occupation: Actress
- Years active: 2015–present

Maya S. Krishnan is an Indian actress known for her work in the Tamil film industry. She made her acting debut in the musical film Vaanavil Vaazhkai (2015). In 2023 she participated in Bigg Boss 7 as a contestant and emerged as the 2nd runner up.

Beyond her film career, she is a theatre artist who has performed internationally with companies including Theatre du Soleil in Paris, Les Hommes Approximatifs in Strasbourg, and Amares Theatre in Uruguay.

Recognizing the need for a creative home for theatre artists, Maya Krishnan founded Ilulu, a theatre collective dedicated to nurturing artistic expression and fostering performance opportunities. The collective serves as a supportive community where artists can explore theatrical forms while developing creative practices and connections with audiences.

She has also gained popularity on YouTube for her character "Manjula Teacher," whose sketch comedy videos on topics like mental health and dating apps have gone viral.

== Career ==
=== Theatre ===
Maya has a background in theatre, having performed internationally with companies such as Theatre du Soleil in Paris and Les Hommes Approximatifs in Strasbourg. In Uruguay, she has collaborated extensively with Amares Theatre. In India, she has been associated with Perch Collective, Indianostrum Theatre, Silkroute theatre, and Adishakthi Theatre.

List of Maya S. Krishnan theatrical credits
Theatre	Play	Notes
Perch	Ki Ra Kozhambu	100 shows
Perch	Birds	
Amares theatro	Love All	
Silkroute	The Little Prince	45 shows
Indianostrum	Hinge yellama	
Indianostrum	Boys drama company	
Indianostrum	Flying chariot	
Indianostrum	School for wives	
Silkroute	A pair of wings I wish for	13 shows
The Perch	Kindhan Charithiram	47 shows

Maya, as part of the perch theatre group, toured various cities performing the stage play Kira Kozhambu along with Ravindra Vijay and Anand Sami. They have done almost 100 performances across the country so far. The play solely featured the three actors and a bench. The play was based on Ki. Rajanarayanan's collection of short stories titled Nattuppura Kadhai Kalanjiyam with Anandsami reprising his role from the original play. A critic stated that "Actors Anand Sami, Maya S. Krishnan and Ravindra Vijay were in their elements with their seamless blend of art and entertainment".

Maya has demonstrated a flair through her work with string puppets in the production of "The Little Prince" at Silk Route Theatre. For this show, she utilized puppets that are approximately 70 years old, reclaimed from a village near Pondicherry. Mastering the art of puppetry, they skillfully manipulated these historic puppets to bring characters to life on stage.

For the Boys Drama Company production, she learned Devarattam, a traditional folk dance of Tamil Nadu.

=== Film ===
Maya debuted in James Vasanthan's Vaanavil Vaazhkai, where she had to cut her hair short to play a singer. She played a reporter in Thodari (2016) and also appeared in movies like Dhruva Natchathiram, 2.0, Magalir Mattum and Server Sundaram. Maya is part of Lokesh Cinematic Universe.

=== Comedy ===
Maya began her career in comedy as a member of Half Boiled Inc, the first-ever improv club in South India. Her time with Half Boiled Inc allowed them to hone her improvisational skills and establish a strong foundation in comedic performance. She specialized in social media sketch comedy.

== Other work ==
She volunteers at several hospitals, including APPOLO Madurai, Egmore Children’s Hospital, Adyar Cancer Institute, and Kauvery Hospital.

== Filmography ==
Key
†	Denotes films that have not yet been released

List of Maya S. Krishnan film credits
Year	Title	Role	Notes
2015	Vaanavil Vaazhkai	Swetha	
2016	Thodari	News Reporter	
2017	Server Sundaram	Unknown	Unreleased
2017	Guru	Boxing student	Telugu film; uncredited
2017	Magalir Mattum	Ameena	
2017	Velaikkaran	Actress	
2017	My Son Is Gay	Maya	
2018	Yenda Thalaiyila Yenna Vekkala	Dora	
2018	2.0	Student	Uncredited
2022	Vikram	Maya	
2023	Leo	Maya	
2023	Dhruva Natchathiram	Unknown	Unreleased
2024	Weapon	Akira	
2025	Fighter Raja	Lucky	Telugu film

=== Web series ===
List of Maya S. Krishnan web series credits
Year	Program	Role	Network	Notes
2020	Time Enna Boss	Velleli	Amazon Prime	Special appearance
2021	LOL - Enga Siri Paappom	Maya	Amazon Prime	
2022	3BHK	Anjana V	YouTube	
2026	Love Always	Meera	Jio Hotstar	

List of Maya S. Krishnan Short Film credits
Year	Title	Notes
2020	MONTAGE (21 Days Of Solitude)	
2020	Maya Unleashed	India’s first-ever female action short film

== Television ==
List of Maya S. Krishnan television credits
Year	Program	Role	Channel	Notes
2023-2024	Bigg Boss 7	Contestant	Vijay TV	2nd Runner Up
2026	Bigg Boss – The Common Man	Host	Star Vijay	
