= Indian Penal Law =

Indian Tamil-language action thriller film

- Theatrical release poster
- Directed by: Karunanithi
- Written by: Karunanithi
- Produced by: G. R. Madhan Krishnan
- Starring: Vaikuntha Vasan; Kishore; Abhirami; Kushitha Kallapu
- Cinematography: S. Pitchumani
- Edited by: Prakash Mabbu
- Music by: Ashwin Vinayagamoorthy
- Production company: Radha Film International
- Release date: 28 November 2025
- Country: India
- Language: Tamil

Indian Penal Law, also marketed as IPL, is a 2025 Indian Tamil-language action thriller film written and directed by Karunanithi. The film is produced by G. R. Madha Krishnan under his Radha Film International banner starring YouTuber TTF Vasan and Kushitha Kallapu in the lead roles, marking their onscreen debut alongside Kishore and Abhirami in important roles. The film was theatrically released on 28 November 2025.

== Plot ==
Gunasekaran (Kishore) lives with his wife, Vasanthi (Abhirami) and his younger sister. Formerly employed by a private company, he resigned after a minor setback, bought a car, and now works as a taxi driver. Anbu (TTF Vasan), a food delivery driver, is in love with Kanimozhi ( Kushita) who is Gunasekaran's younger sister.

One day, Gunasekaran is involved in an accident and injures his leg. He is then unable to drive. At the same time, Muthukaruppan (Bose Venkat), a police officer, beats a man to death in the cells. He holds Gunasekaran responsible and has him arrested. What Transpires Next Forms The Rest Of The Plot .

== Cast ==
- Vaikuntha Vasan as Anbu
- Kishore as Gunasekaran
- Abhirami as Vasanthi
- Kushitha Kallapu as Kanimozhi
- Hareesh Peradi as Praveen Menon
- Bose Venkat as Muthukaruppan
- John Vijay as Special Squad Officer
- Namo Narayana as MLA Aalavandhan
- Aadukalam Naren as Thirupathisamy
- Singampuli as Gunasekaran's brother-in-law
- Dileepan as Srinikesh
- Janani Samathanam
- Birla Bose
- Madhumitha
- Redin Kingsley as Mathew

== Music ==
The audio rights were acquired by Saregama. The first single "Appo Ippo" was released on 29 October 2025. The second single "Yaavalo" was released on 5 November 2025.

All music is composed by Ashwin Vinayagamoorthy.

Track listing
No.	Title	Lyrics	Singer(s)	Length
1.	"Appo Ippo"	Gana Karikalan, Gana Ruthra	Ashwin Vinayagamoorthy
2.	"Yaavalo"	Ku. Karthik	Shivam Mahadevan, Chinmayi Sripada

== Release and reception ==
Indian Penal Law was theatrically released on 28 November 2025.

A critic from Dinamalar rated the film 2/5 stars and wrote that although the story is about punishment and torture for the innocents, the real tortured people are the ones watching the film. A critic from Maalai Malar rated the film 2.5/5 stars and wrote that the screenplay of the first half is not understandable and the second half is slow.

=== Streaming rights ===
The Streaming rights of the movie were latter bagged by Tentkotta on 7 February 2026. It also available on Lionsgate Play and Amazon Prime Video from 5 June 2026.
