= Vaanavil Vaazhkai =

2015 Indian film by James Vasanthan

- Theatrical release poster
- Directed by: James Vasanthan
- Written by: James Vasanthan
- Starring: Jithin Raj; Sai Shankar; Jose Selvaraj; Jonathan Devadoss; Pavithran; Shilvi Sharon; Radhika George; Maya S. Krishnan; Janani Rajan; Cassandra Rachel
- Cinematography: R. K. Prathap
- Music by: James Vasanthan
- Production company: Oceanaa AJR Cine Arts
- Release date: 13 March 2015
- Country: India
- Language: Tamil

Vaanavil Vaazhkai (transl. Colourful life) is a 2015 Indian Tamil-language coming-of-age musical film written and directed by James Vasanthan in his directorial debut. He also worked as music composer. The film stars predominantly newcomers who also sing the songs picturised on their characters. It was released on 13 March 2015.

== Plot ==
Rival bands come together to compete in a national inter-university competition.

== Cast ==
- Jithin Raj as Jack
- Sai Shankar as Arvind
- Jose Selvaraj as Fayaz
- Jonathan Devadoss as Pramod
- Pavithran as Saravanan
- Shilvi Sharon as Ankita
- Radhika George as Harini
- Maya S. Krishnan as Poorni
- Janani Rajan as Preethi
- Cassandra Rachel as Vinita
- Gaana Siva as Gaana Raja
- Santhosh Cherian as GL Judge
- Josh Mark Raj as GL Judge
- Ilayaraja as Team Folk Singer
- Dr. Joseph Selvaraj as Dr. Parthasarathy
- Aarthi Murali as Prof. Gurupriya
- Prof. Saravanan as Prof. Selvaraj
- Rashna Adhiraj as Jack's mother
- Malic Ibrahim as Jack's mother
- S. Sowmya as Preethi's mother
- Sundaresan as Preethi's fother
- Richwin Roy as Harini's brother
- Prof. Karthik as Loyola College Professor
- Aparna as Vinita's friend
- Prajitha as Vinita's friend

== Production ==
Vaanavil Vaazhkai is the directorial debut of music director James Vasanthan, who wrote the script in six months. For the film's cast, he decided to take newcomers, primarily college students and those from college bands. Among the newcomers were vocalist/guitarist Jithin Raj, Carnatic music-trained Janani Rajan, percussionists Jose Selvaraj and Radhika George, singer Cassandra Rachel, Carnatic singer S. Sowmya, and Maya S. Krishnan. It took nearly two years to finalise the lead artistes. James Vasanthan did not learn the basics of filmmaking or work as an assistant director before directing this film, saying "I’m just making a film that I would like to see on screen." He likened it to a "Broadway musical", and said the film would feature the actors singing the songs, as opposed to using playback singers. The film was produced by Oceanaa AJR Cine Arts, and had cinematography by R. K. Prathap.

== Soundtrack ==
The soundtrack was composed by James Vasanthan. It features 17 songs, all performed by the actors themselves.

Track listing
No.	Title	Lyrics	Singer(s)	Length
1.	"Bye to School"	James Vasanthan	Santhosh Cherian	4:12
2.	"Music Makes Me Happy"	James Vasanthan	Jithin Raj	2:59
3.	"Supergirl"	Harish Raghavendra	Cassandra Rachel	3:01
4.	"We Are Happy This Way"	James Vasanthan	Jithin Raj	3:43
5.	"Vazha Pirandhaval"	Mohan Rajan	Janani Rajan	3:21
6.	"This Is Real Love"	James Vasanthan	Shilvi Sharon, Janani Rajan	3:27
7.	"Boys Don't Cry"	James Vasanthan	Jithin Raj, Janani Rajan, Maya Krishnan, Shilvi Sharon	3:47
8.	"God Bless Saturday"	James Vasanthan	Jithin Raj, Janani Rajan, Maya Krishnan, Shilvi Sharon	3:12
9.	"Four In One"	James Vasanthan	Jithin Raj	1:28
10.	"Culturals Vandhirukkum"	Gaana Shiva	Gaana Shiva	3:06
11.	"Senthamizh Naadenum"	Subramania Bharati	Jithin Raj	1:04
12.	"Vaasanai"	Yugabharathi	Jithin Raj, Janani Rajan, Maya Krishnan, Sai Shankar, Shilvi Sharon, Jonathan Devadoss	3:40
13.	"Vaazhndhidave Vidu"	Harish Raghavendra	Janani Rajan	2:48
14.	"Please Forgive Me"	James Vasanthan	Jithin Raj	2:35
15.	"Tamizhukkum Amudhendru Per"	Bharathidasan	Jithin Raj, Janani Rajan	2:05
16.	"Tamizh Nadu Engal Veedu"	Sumathi Sri	Jithin Raj, Janani Rajan, Cassandra Rachel, Ilaiyaraaja, Niranjana, Vaijaynthi Sri, Vaishali	5:18
17.	"Vaanavil Vaazhkai"	James Vasanthan	Jithin Raj, Janani Rajan, Sai Shankar, Cassandra Rachel, Shilvi Sharon	3:30
Total length:				53:16

== Release and reception ==
Vaanavil Vaazhkai was released on 13 March 2015. M. Suganth of The Times of India rated the film 1.5 out of 5 stars, saying, "The film is so devoid of excitement that even the final portions, involving the university championship, do not get our pulses racing." Vishal Menon of The Hindu panned the film, saying, "The idea to make a musical is creditable, but VV is a wasted effort. I only wish James had co-directed the film with someone more capable of handling the technical aspects."
