= Abhinaya Krishna =

Indian film actor

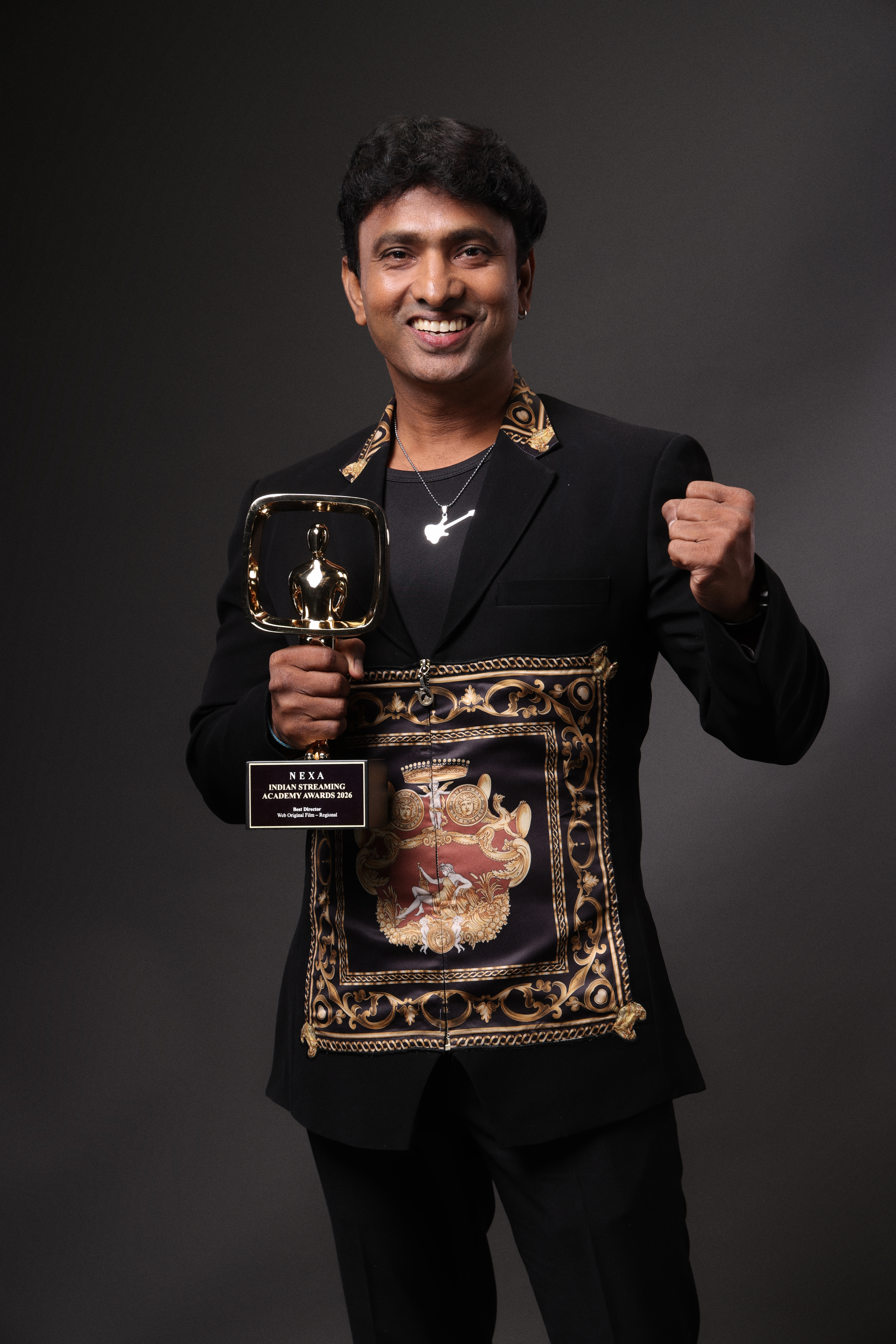
- Born: Hari Krishna; Telangana, India
- Other names: Abhinaya Krishna, Adhire Abhi
- Education: Masters in Electronics
- Occupations: Actor, Director
- Awards: Limca Book of Records, Indian Book of Records, Best Debut Director

Abhinaya Krishna is an Indian actor who works in Telugu films and television. Krishna debuted with the drama film Eeswar in 2002. He is working as an Actor, Director, Emcee and stand-up comedian.

== Career ==
He is popularly known as Adhire Abhi in Jabardasth which telecasts on E TV (India). He worked as creative director for Meelo Evaru Koteeswarudu, the Telugu version of Who Wants to Be a Millionaire?.

He worked as an assistant director under director S. S. Rajamouli for Baahubali 2.

Won BEST DIRECTOR for Web Original - Regional in Maruti Nexa Indian Streaming Academy Awards 2026 for his movie Chiranjeeva.

Won Bharat Kala Puraskar Award- 2026 for his Achievements in Telugu Film and TV industry.

He won BEST DEBUT DIRECTOR for his movie Chiranjeeva. This award was presented in Andhra Pradesh International Film Festival by Indian Film Makers Association

He created a record in LIMCA BOOK OF RECORDS for imitating 25 Actor's dancing Styles

He created a record in Indian Book of Records for completing shoot of a feature film in just 10 hours

== Filmography ==
=== As Film Actor ===
Year	Title	Role
2002	Eeswar	Laddu
2003	Vishnu	Krishna
2004	Vidyardhi	Abhinaya
2005	Gowtam SSC	Abhi
2012	Eega	Traffic Constable
2017	Baahubali 2: The Conclusion	Kumara Varma's assistant
2017	Raagala 24 Gantallo	
2021	Point Blank	Inspector
2025	The Devil's Chair	Karthik

=== As director ===
Year	Movie Name	Awards	Other Roles Played
2025	Chiranjeeva	Indian Streaming Academy Awards -2026 Andhra Pradesh International Film Festival - 2026 Bharat Kala Puraskar Award - 2026	
2026	Karmakhya		

=== As Television Actor ===
TV Channel	Title	Role
ETV	Jabardasth (TV series)	Team leader for 10 years
MAA TV	Rangam Dance Show	Celebrity Dancer
ZEE TV	Kitchen Maharani	Emcee
Gemini TV	Kirak Kabaddi	Emcee
ETV	Adhurs 2	Emcee
ETV	Maha Maha Mass	Emcee
