= Resort (TV series) =

Indian TV Series

- Genre: Culinary; Workplace comedy; Sitcom
- Written by: Vijay Kumar Rajendran
- Directed by: Praveen Bennett
- Starring: Vijay Kumar Rajendran; Abeneya Nethrun; Thalaivasal Vijay; Amar Keerthi; Ganja Karuppu
- Theme music composer: Arun Raj
- Composer: Rashaanth Arwin
- Country of origin: India
- Original language: Tamil
- No. of seasons: 1
- No. of episodes: 100 (101 BTS of Resort)

Production
- Executive producer: K. Gopi
- Producer: R. Venkatesh Babu
- Production locations: Chennai; Mahabalipuram
- Cinematography: R. Naresh Narayanan
- Editor: Nithish Kumar V
- Running time: approx.25–35 minutes per episode
- Production company: Global Villagers

Original release
- Network: JioHotstar
- Release: 13 March – 28 August 2026

Resort is an Indian Tamil-language culinary workplace comedy sitcom television series starring Vijay Kumar Rajendran, Abeneya Nethrun and Thalaivasal Vijay. The series is written by Vijay Kumar Rajendran and directed by Praveen Bennett for JioHotstar. The plot revolves follows Vettri, a 12th-fail room service boy with exceptional culinary talent and dreams of becoming a chef.

The principal characters of the series include Elango Kumanan , Dharshna Sripal Golecha, Ebi Rajhn, Kavipriya Jayavel, Keerthivel, Amar Keerthi, Vishnu Bala, Sai Dhanyaa, Badava Gopi, Giri Dwarakish and Lallu.It premiered on JioHotstar on 13 March 2026.

== Plot ==
Set in the fictional RR Resort, the story centers on Vettri, a 12th-fail room service worker who dreams of becoming a professional chef. Despite possessing natural culinary talent, he faces constant humiliation and pressure from a ruthless kitchen hierarchy. Determined to prove himself, Vetri begins challenging the toxic system, navigating friendships, rivalry, and ambition in a high-stakes hospitality environment.

== Cast ==
- Vijay Kumar Rajendran as Vetri Chidambaram, Aishwarya's love interest and Veni, Pandi, Ramya, Riya, Rajan and Raghupathi's friend
- Thalaivasal Vijay as Executive Chef Nedumaran, Aishwarya and Divya's father, and the new CEO of RR Resort
- Amar Keerthi as Pandi, Vetri's friend
- Abeneya Nethrun as Sous Chef Aishwarya "Aishu"/Aura, Vetri's love interest and a professional singer
- Dharshna Sripal Golecha as Riya, Rajan's love interest; Deepak's ex-wife and Aishwarya's friend
- Lallu as Rajan, Resort Manager (later CEO) of RR Resort; Riya's love interest and Aishwarya's friend
- Elango Kumanan as Raghupathi, Riya's father and the founder CEO of RR Resort
- Ganja Karuppu as Chef Chidambaram "Chika", Vetri and Selvi's father; and Nedumaaran's friend
- SriHari as Siddharth
- Ebi Rajhn as Chef Shiva
- Vishnu Bala as Chef Vicky, Veni's love interest
- Sai Dhanyaa Pallath as Chef Veni, Vicky's love interest
- Badava Gopi as Uthaman, Room Service Head
- Giri Dwarakish as Chef John, Nedumaaran's assistant
- Kavipriya Jayavel as Chef Ramya, Bhavani's daughter and Vetri's one-sided lover
- Kishore Dev as Deepak, Riya's ex-husband and Raghupathi's ex-son-in-law
- Anugraha S. Nambiar as Srinidhi, Vicky's one-sided lover
- Soundarya Saravanan as Bhavani, Ramya's mother
- Divya Vijaykumar as Selvi Chidambaram, Vetri's sister and Chidambaram's daughter
- Vekkey as Martin, Raghupathi's rival
- Priya Krishnan as Receptionist Priya
- Keerthivel as Edison, Vetri's assistant in the pantry, later room service boy
- Thirunavukkarasu as Chef Chezhiyan
- Sunitha Thomas as Chef Grace
- Archana Unnikrishnan as Divya, Aishwarya's sister and Nedumaran's daughter; and Karthik's love interest turned to wife
- Kannadhasan Shanmugam as Karthik, Divya's love interest turned to husband
- Auditor Sridhar as Joji, Padma's ex-lover
- Kallu as Padma, Joji's ex-lover
- Rindhu Ravi as Vetri and Selvi's mother; and Chidambaram's wife
- Shruti Shanmugapriya as Padma's daughter
- Jebin John as Padma's son-in-law
- Birla Bose as Inspector Kulothungan, Ragupathi's friend
- Ajay Kapoor as Musician Shibu
- Dolly as Stella, a room service girl whom Pandi loves one-sided
- Prasanth San as Prasanth
- Elango Kumaravel as Rajadurai "Durai"

== Production ==
=== Development ===
The series was announced by JioHotstar on 9 December 2025 as part of its South UnBound content slate. The platform planned to launch nine new Tamil-language original shows under the initiative. Resort was developed as one of the projects in this lineup and was created as one of the Hotstar Specials series scheduled for release in 2026.

The series is directed by Praveen Bennett and written by Vijay Kumar Rajendran. It is produced by Global Villagers, a production company known for producing Tamil television serials such as Mahanadhi, Ayyanar Thunai and Kana Kaanum Kaalangal.

=== Release ===
The official glimpse of the series was released on 9 December 2025 by JioHotstar ahead of the series’ premiere, introducing the setting of a luxury resort and the central characters while highlighting the show’s blend of workplace drama and comedy.The first trailer was released on 2 March 2026, featuring Vettri joining the RR Resort as a housekeeping employee while aspiring to become a professional chef, as he faces the strict supervision of executive chef Nedumaaran, highlighting the series’ blend of workplace comedy, ambition, and drama.

It was announced that the series would be released in Tamil and other Indian languages and made its streaming debut on 13 March 2026.

== Music ==
The first theme song was released on 23 February 2026 on the JioHotstar YouTube Channel.

Track list
No.	Title	Lyrics	Music	Artist	Length
1.	"Resort Song (Always Welcome) ரிசார்ட் பாடல் (எப்போதும் வரவேற்கிறோம்)"	Madhan	Arun Raj	Velmurugan	1:04

== Reception ==
=== Critical response ===
Siddartha Toleti of M9 News wrote that, "The four episodes of Resort precisely set the ground ready for the drama to marinate over the coming weeks. There is nothing overwhelmingly new about the story, clash and the drama, yet it is perfectly suited for timepass, inoffensive viewing, a bare minimum that we do not get to experience lately".

== Controversy ==
At the middle of April 2026, Malayalam actress Anugraha S Nambiar, who plays the role of Srinidhi, released a video alleging that the makers of his web series Resort Producer and actor Vijay Kumar Rajendran and his wife have not paid her fee and have engaged in contractual traps.
