= Chiranjeeva =

2025 Indian Telugu film by Abhinaya Krishna

- Release poster
- Directed by: Abhinaya Krishna
- Screenplay by: MS
- Story by: Abhinaya Krishna
- Produced by: Rahul Avudoddi; Suhasini Rahul
- Starring: Raj Tarun; Kushitha Kallapu
- Cinematography: Rakesh S Narayan
- Edited by: Sai Murali
- Music by: Achu Rajamani
- Production company: Streamline Productions
- Distributed by: Aha
- Release date: 7 November 2025
- Running time: 111 minutes
- Country: India
- Language: Telugu

Chiranjeeva is a 2025 Indian Telugu-language fantasy comedy drama film directed and co-written by Abhinaya Krishna. It features Raj Tarun and Kushitha Kallapu in lead roles.

The film was released on Aha on 7 November 2025.

== Plot ==
Shiva (Raj Tarun) is a middle-class ambulance driver leading an ordinary life. After a strange accident, he suddenly gains a supernatural ability to see the lifespan of anyone he meets. At first, he tries to use this power to earn money and improve his situation. But when he loses someone very close to him, his perspective changes completely. What he decides to do with this unique ability and how he chooses to move forward form the rest of the story.

== Cast ==
- Raj Tarun as Siva
- Kushitha Kallapu as Divya
- Raja Ravindra as MLA Rajayya
- Subbaraya Sarma
- Rahul Avudoddi
- Prabhavathi Varma
- Divya
- Jaya Naidu
- Kireeti Damaraju as Rao
- Balagam Sanjay Krishna
- Nalla Sreedhar Reddy
- Sathanna
- Ramachandra
- Racha Ravi
- Jabardasth Emmanuel
- Jabardasth Apparao
- Gaddam Naveen
- Tasty Teja

== Release and reception ==
Chiranjeeva was announced as a television series on Aha, which ultimately released directly as a feature film on 7 November 2025.

OTTPlay rated it 2.5 out of 5 and wrote "Chiranjeeva is a comedy caper that is predictable and flat for the most part". NTV also gave the same rating.
