= Kushitha Kallapu =

Indian actress (born 2002)

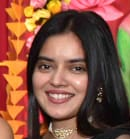
- Kushitha Kallapu in 2023
- Born: 19 October 2002 (age 24)
- Other name: Kushita Kallapu
- Occupations: Actress; model
- Years active: 2023–present
- Relatives: Lishi Ganesh (sister)

Kushitha Kallapu (also credited as Kushita Kallapu; born 19 October 2002) is an Indian actress and model who works mainly in Telugu, and more recently Tamil, cinema. She played her first leading film role in the 2023 romantic drama Neethone Nenu, and went on to play leading roles in Babu (No.1 Bullshit Guy) (2024), Chiranjeeva (2025) and the Tamil film Indian Penal Law (2025).

Kushitha first became known as a social-media personality before establishing herself in films. She came to wider public notice in 2022 after she and her sister, the model Lishi Ganesh, were reported to be present during a Hyderabad pub drug raid.

== Career ==
Kushitha's first leading film role came in the 2023 romantic drama Neethone Nenu, directed by Anji Ram; she played Ayesha, a village physical-education teacher, in a performance a reviewer described as "executed with finesse".

In 2024, she played the female lead, Kushi, opposite Arjun Kalyan in the comedy Babu (No.1 Bullshit Guy), directed by MLR (Laxman Varma) and produced by Dandu Dileep Kumar Reddy. A role she had filmed for Mahesh Babu's Guntur Kaaram (2024) was edited out of the final film, about which she publicly expressed disappointment.

In 2025 she starred opposite Raj Tarun in Chiranjeeva, released on Aha. The same year she made her Tamil-cinema debut as a lead in the action thriller Indian Penal Law (marketed as IPL), written and directed by Karunanithi, opposite YouTuber-turned-actor TTF Vasan; it was released on 28 November 2025.

== Public image ==
Kushitha first became widely known as a social-media personality before moving into film acting.

Her public profile rose in 2022 in connection with a pub drug case. In a pre-dawn raid on 3 April 2022, the Hyderabad Task Force searched the Pudding & Mink pub inside the Radisson Blu hotel in Banjara Hills and seized about five grams of cocaine; the manager and a co-owner were arrested. Kushitha and her sister Lishi Ganesh were reported to be among those detained; Kushitha said publicly that they had gone there only to eat cheese bajjis (fritters), a remark that went viral and led to her being nicknamed the "cheese bajji girl", or "Bajji Papa", online. A separate drug raid at the Radisson Blu in Gachibowli on 25 January 2024 named several people including Lishi Ganesh; that case concerned her sister rather than Kushitha.

In 2025 she drew political attention after posting an Instagram story showing VIP passes—reported to be worth around ₹40,000—for a Sunrisers Hyderabad–Chennai Super Kings Indian Premier League match that were marked as complimentary tickets for the Telangana chief minister; the post prompted questions over how passes meant for the office of Chief Minister Revanth Reddy had reached her, and was taken up by the opposition BRS.

== Filmography ==
Year	Title	Role	Language	Notes	Ref.
2023	Neethone Nenu	Ayesha	Telugu	Lead; debut leading role	
2024	Babu (No.1 Bullshit Guy)	Kushi	Telugu	Female lead	
2025	Chiranjeeva		Telugu	Lead; released on Aha	
2025	Indian Penal Law		Tamil	Tamil-cinema debut; lead role	
2026	Ram and Leela		Tamil		
