= Mahanadhi (TV series) =

2023 Indian Tamil TV series

- Also known as: Mahanadhi - Sagodharigalin Kadhai
- Genre: Drama
- Written by: Priya Thambi
- Directed by: Praveen Bennett
- Starring: Lakshmi Priya; Swaminathan Anantharaman
- Opening theme: Sonthamulla Vaazhkai Sorgathukku Mela
- Country of origin: India
- Original language: Tamil
- No. of episodes: 881

Production
- Executive producers: John, Anthony
- Production location: Tamil Nadu
- Editor: Vinoth Kumar.A
- Camera setup: Multi-Camera
- Running time: 22 minutes
- Production company: Global Villagers

Original release
- Network: Star Vijay
- Release: 23 January 2023 – 26 June 2026

Mahanadhi – Sagotharigalin Kadhai (transl. The Great River – The Story of Sisters) is a 2023 Indian Tamil-language drama television series that premiered on Star Vijay on 23 January 2023 and ended on 26 June 2026 with 881 episodes. It is produced by Praveen Bennett under the banner of Global Villagers. It is also available on the digital platform JioHotstar. The series was launched along with Siragadikka Aasai.

== Plot ==
The story begins with the happy lives of four sisters— Ganga, Kaveri, Yamuna, and Narmadha —and their parents, Santhanam and Saradha with their paternal grandmother, Annakili. Their world is shattered when their father, Santhanam died of heart attack upon finding out that his best friend and close confidant, Pasupathy, had cheated him of his wealth and property. Following his death, the family is continued to be betrayed by Pasupathy, till the second daughter, Kaveri, finds out the conspiracy and they almost lost their ancestral property. Amidst this tragedy, a complex web of love emerges: Nivin, Pasupathy's nephew and Kaveri are deeply in love, while Kumaran, Santhanam's nephew, a tailor harbours a silent, steadfast love for the eldest sister, Ganga. However it was not reciprocated by Ganga. Due to unforeseen circumstances, Nivin ends up getting engaged to Pasupathy's daughter, Ragini and broke Kaveri's heart. At the same time, Ganga agreed to marry Kumaran. However, due to family pressures and financial ruin, the sisters are forced to navigate a world that is suddenly hostile.

After much struggle, Kaveri successfully managed to claim a small portion of money that was swindled from her father by Pasupathy. The entire family including the four sisters, their mother, Kumaran and Annakili Patti, relocate to Chennai for urgent medical treatment of the youngest Nadhi sister. The struggle for survival in Chennai leads Kaveri to a life-altering decision. To save her family from financial collapse and secure medical treatment for Narmadha, Kaveri enters into a contract marriage with Vijay, a wealthy but jaded man. This sacrifice comes at a heavy cost, one year of her life in exchange for money.

In the meantime, Nivin, her ex called off the wedding and came to Chennai. He soon found out that Kaveri had married and moved on. Devastated upon hearing the news, he eventually decided to distance himself but Vijay, filled with guilt for the contract marriage, let him in on the secret and request for him to wait for Kaveri (a decision he later regretted as he fell in love with his wife).

The story proceeds to show on how each sister navigate their life and overcome hurdles and tragedies.

Kaveri's story is of her life with Vijay, which started them out as pseudo-enemies who hated each other to eventually end up falling in love.

While Ganga's story is of her life with Kumaran and their tailoring business.

Yamuna navigates her studies but eventually end up falling in love with Nivin, who in hopes of trying to win back Kaveri attempted to help Yamuna. But he ended up in a forced marriage with Yamuna when she became obsessed with him.

The rest of the story is about how the Nadhi sisters overcome everyday life hurdles involving ex lovers, fake families and threats from the ever sinister Pasupathy.

Meanwhile, both Ganga and Kaveri became pregnant at the same time. Tragedy strikes again when a massive accident occurs; Kaveri suffers severe memory loss and is separated from Vijay and her new born baby. Believing Kaveri to be dead, a devastated Vijay moved from Chennai to Kanchipuram, named his newborn daughter Kaveri Jr. in honor of his wife, while the rest of the Kaveri's family is forced out of the house by Vijay’s scheming relatives.

Ganga and Kumaran have returned to Kodaikanal, where Kumaran runs a successful tailoring business, and they raise their daughter, Yazhini. In Chennai, Nivin and Yamuna have started their life after years, with Yamuna serving as an IAS Collector.

The heart of the current drama lies in the fact that Kaveri is alive but living under the care of her mother Saradha, still suffering from amnesia and unaware of her past while Vijay is living with their daughter unaware that his wife is alive. After days, Vijay finds that Kaveri is the class teacher of their daughter and confronts with his family. Later he makes efforts to win back the heart of Kaveri who doesn't reciprocate his love.

== Cast ==
=== Main ===
- Lakshmi Priya as Kaveri Vijay: Vijay's wife, Kaveri Jr. aka Ammu’s mother, the second daughter of Mahanadhi family.
- Swaminathan Anantharaman as Vijay: Kaveri's husband, Kaveri Jr. aka Ammu’s father, a young CEO, the second son-in-law of Mahanadhi family
- Prathiba(2023)/Divya Ganesh (Nov 2023-2024)/Dharani Hephzibah (Aug 2024-2026) as Ganga: kumaran’s wife , eldest daughter of mahanadhi family and yazhini’s mother .
- K.Kamrudin as Kumaran: Ganga's husband, Yazhini 's father, the eldest son in law of mahanadhi family, Santhanam's nephew (2023-2025)
- Aadhirai Soundarajan (2023–2025) / Swetha Kumar (Jul.2025–2026) as Yamuna: the third oldest sister of Mahanadhi family and Nivin's wife, Raghav's ex-lover
- Rudran Praveen as Nivin : Yamuna’s husband , Kaveri’s ex lover , third son in law of Mahanadhi family
- Kaavya (2023-2025) / Abhinaya (2026) after 5 years leap. as Narmadha: the youngest sister of Mahanadhi family

=== Recurring ===
- Sujatha Sivakumar as Saradha, Santhanam's wife, Mother of Mahanadhi Sisters
- Baby Safa as Yazhini: Ganga and Kumaran's daughter
- Baby Harshitha as Kaveri jr aka Ammu: Vijay and Kaveri’s daughter
- Pankajam as Annakkili Paatti - Santhanam and Shanthi's mother, Saradha's Mother-in-law, Grandmother of Mahanadi Sisters, Kumaran's Ammachi
- Manikandan Raj as Somasundaram "Somu" - Kalyani's husband, Radha's father, Vijay, Ajay and Kavya's grandfather.
- Kallu as Kalyani Somasundaram: Somasundaram's wife, Radha's mother, Vijay, Ajay and Kavya's grandmother. (dead)
- Bharathi Mohan as Anbarasu - Vijay's Uncle, Radha's husband. Ajay and Kavya's father. Raagini's father-in-law
- Padmini Chandrasekhar as Radha - Vijay's aunt. Ajay and Kavya's mother. Raagini's mother-in-law.
- Ramesh as Pasupathy - Santhanama's betrayal friend Father of Ragini and Raghav.
- Shathiga as Ragini - Pasupathy's daughter, Ajay's wife
- Sanjay Mohan (2023-2024) / Karthikeyan (2025–2026) as Raghav - Raagini's brother, Pasupathy's son, Yamuna's ex-lover

=== Other ===
- Saravanan as Santhanam, Sarada's husband, father of Mahanadi sisters (2023) (Dead)
- Kanmani Manoharan (2024) / Vaishali Thaniga (Nov.2024–2025) as Vennila - Vijay's ex-lover
- KB Bala Balasubramaniam as Nambirajan, Vennila's uncle (2025)
- Kavitha Solairaja as Pankajam, house owner's wife
- Vaishu Jayachandhiran as Kavya - Anbarasu and Radha's daughter, Vijay's cousin sister, Ajay's sister. (2024)
- Vishwa Mithran as Salim, Kumaran's friend. (2023)
- Shruti Shanmuga Priya as Vijay's mother (2025) (Dead)
- Milla as fashion show judge (2024)
- Senthi Kumari as Muthu Malar, a lady who fakely introduced her as Santhanam’s wife (2025-2026)
- Aravindh as Krishna, Muthu Malar's son (2025-2026)
- Abinaya as Sindhu, Muthu Malar's daughter (2025-2026)
- Baskar Natarajan as Ajay - Anbarasu's and Radha son, Vijay's cousin brother, Kavya's brother, Ragini's Husband (2023-2025)
- Sumi Santhosh as Jaya, Nivin's mother, Pasupathi sister (2023-2025)
- Radha as Santhi, Kumaran’s Mother (2023-2025)
- Mahalakshmi S as Mary, Kumaran’s sister (2023-2025)

== Production ==
=== Development ===
The shooting of the serial commenced in December 2022. The first promo was released on 7 January 2023. The series was also promoted in the Bigg Boss 6 house on 16 January.

=== Casting ===
Lakshmi Priya cast as the main female lead as Kaveri. Prathiba and Aadhirai were cast in parallel leads as Ganga and Yamuna. On 23 November 2023, Prathiba opted out from the show due to her upcoming movie offers and was replaced by Divya Ganesh, However she left the series in August 2024 to gets hospitalized due to Dengue. She was replaced by newcomer actress Dharani Hephzibah. In late June 2025, Aadhirai left the series due to participation in Bigg Boss Season 9 Tamil, so she was replaced by newcomer actress Swetha Kumar. Newcomer actors Kamuruddin and Rudran Praveen portrayed parallel male leads as Kumaran and Nivin respectively, but in October 2025, Kamuruddin quit the series to participate in Bigg Boss Season 9. Saravanan and Sujatha Sivakumar were also selected for supporting roles.

On 27 September 2023, Swaminathan Anantharaman was introduced as the male lead, Vijay, for a new storyline with Kaveri. In mid 2024, Kanmani Manoharan was cast as the pivotal role as Vennila (Vijay's ex-lover). But later in November 2024, she was to quit the series because of her pregnancy so Vaishali Thaniga was then replaced her as Vennila. But in July 2025, she also left the series due to her pregnancy so her character Vennila was ended with a positive note.

In early 2025 Kavitha Solairaja was cast to play an extended special appearance.

== Crossovers ==
Following a promo released on 2 February, it was teased that there would be a crossover between Mahanadhi and Aaha Kalyanam. This was then confirmed with a promo released by Star Vijay, with both families staying at the same resort to compete for 5 lakhs.

== Adaptations ==
Language	Title	First aired	Channel	Last aired	Notes	Ref.
Tamil	Mahanadhi மகாநதி	23 January 2023	Star Vijay	26 June 2026	Original	
Kannada	Vasudeva Kutumba ವಸುದೇವ ಕುಟುಂಬ	15 September 2025	Star Suvarna	Ongoing	Remake	
Malayalam	Ee Puzhayum Kadannu ഈ പുഴയും കടന്ന്	2 February 2026	Asianet	Ongoing	Remake	
Telugu	Godavari గోదావరి	11 May 2026	Star Maa	Ongoing	Remake	
