= Vaikuntha Vasan =

Indian Actor, YouTuber and social media influencer

TTF Vasan
- Born: Vaikuntha Vasan; 29 June 2000 (age 26); Coimbatore, Tamil Nadu, India
- Occupations: YouTuber; Vlogger; Actor
- Years active: 2020–present

YouTube information
- Channel: Twin Throttlers
- Genres: vlogs; entertainment; racing
- Subscribers: 5.2 million (main channel)
- Views: 1.6 billion
- Last updated: 20 November 2026

Vaikuntha Vasan, better known as TTF Vasan (born 29 June 2000) is an Indian YouTuber, actor, and, television personality. He gained recognition on YouTube, through his racing videos and vlogs.

== Career ==
In 2020, he established his YouTube channel Twin Throttlers’ on which he posts motovlogging videos that showcase him performing daring stunts on his bike like wheelies, driving at high speed on public roads, and his travel escapades. In 2021, he received a Silver Play Button for his channel. Later, he made his debut into acting. He was cast in the lead role in the Tamil film Manjal Veeran, produced by The Budget Company. The first look of the film was released on 29 June 2023, on his birthday. The poster featured the YouTuber riding a bullet and doing a wheelie while wielding a mace. However, due to personal reasoning he was later replaced from the film by actor Cool Suresh. He made his official debut in the 2025 film Indian Penal Law. In 2026, he participated in the reality show Bigg Boss (Tamil TV series) season 10 as a contestant.

== Controversies ==
In September 2022, Vasan faced allegations of reckless driving and endangering others, as he shared a video of himself and fellow YouTube influencer GP Muthu riding at a dangerous speed in Palakkad, Kerala. In a video, Vasan can be seen driving at a speed of more than 150 kmph while riding on his Kawasaki Z900 superbike. To make matters worse, his pillion, GP Muthu, was riding without a safety helmet. Vasan was booked under section 279 of the Indian Penal Code (IPC) and section 184 of the Motor Vehicles Act.

In December 2022, Vasan, along with 300 others, was booked for obstructing traffic in Cuddalore while he was on his way to inaugurate the office of director Chellam Senthil. Over 300 youths riding motorcycles joined him on his way, slowing down traffic movement at several locations in the town.

On 17 September 2023, TTF Vasan had an accident while attempting a wheelie on the service road of the Chennai-Vellore highway in the Thamal area near Kanchipuram. A wheelie is a stunt in which the front wheel of the two-wheeler is raised off the road for a brief period. He was thrown off his bike and suffered minor injuries. The Baluchetty Chatram police booked Vasan under section 279 (rash driving or riding on a public way) and 337 (causing hurt by act endangering life or personal safety of others) of the Indian Penal Code (IPC). On 19 September, the police arrested him and notified the Regional Transport Office (RTO) of his outstanding traffic violations. In October 2023, Vasan's driving license was suspended for the next ten years, until 5 October 2033, due to his reckless motorcycle riding. Following this incident, the YouTuber was imprisoned in Puzhal Jail.

== Filmography ==
Year	Film	Role	Language	Notes
2025	Indian Penal Law	Anbu	Tamil	

=== Television ===
Year	Title	Role	Channel
2026	Bigg Boss season 10	Contestant	Vijay TV
