= Deverattam =

Devarattam, Theivarattam is a Tamil Word derived from the words "Devam" or "Theivam" (Tamil meaning: the God/ King/ Warriors) and "Attam" (Tamil meaning: the dance). Traditionally, it was performed by the peoples, kings and warriors after a successful battle, in festival, practice of religion particularly in the Vijayanagara Empire period in South India. From Nayaka dynasties this was danced by the Nayakas Nayakar community in Tamilnadu who are referred to as Thanjavur Nayaks, Madurai Nayaks , Nayaks of Vellore, Nayaks of Gingee, Nayakas of Keladi, Nayakas of Kalahasti of Vijayangaram Empire. Nayakas Theivarattam is dance in the form of Art of War with swords and spears and disclosure with feeling and emotion of Kings and Warriors in ancient days. In period following Indian independence, Theivarattam is performed mostly by the Rajakambalam clan belongs to Nayakar community. For many generations and upkeep traditions and religious practices. Presently, Theivarattam was mostly performed only by the peoples of the Nayakar community in TamilNadu during the temple festivals and other functions in Tamil Nadu in the region of Madurai, Dindugal, in the region of Thanjavur, Namakkal, Karur, Salem, Erode, Ramanathapuram, Pudukottai, Sivagangai, Virudhunagar, Tirunelveli, Thoothukudi and nearby regions.
