= 2023 in Tamil television =

The following is a list of events affecting Tamil language television in 2023 (from India (Tamilnadu), Sri Lanka, Singapore, Malaysia and the Tamil diaspora). Events listed include television show debuts and finales; channel launches and closures; stations changing or adding their network affiliations; and information about changes of ownership of channels or stations.

== Events and new channels ==
=== January ===
Date	Event	Notes	Ref
14	Zee Tamil Kudumbam Viruthugal 2022	The award function was hosted by RJ Vijay. It was telecast on 14 and 16 January at 6:30 pm.	
16	Zee Tamil Kudumbam Viruthugal 2022	The award function was hosted by RJ Vijay. It was telecast on 14 and 16 January at 6:30 pm.	

Date	Channel	Notes	Ref
15	Blacksheep TV	Tamil language general entertainment television channel that was scheduled to launch on 15 January	

=== June ===
Date	Event	Notes	Ref
11	Sun Kudumbam Virudhugal 2023	The sixth edition of Sun Kudumbam Viruthugal 2023 was aired as three parts, the first part being aired on 11 June, the second on 18 June and the third on 28 June. The hosts were Rishi, Diya Menon, VJ Aswath and Bavithra.	
18	Sun Kudumbam Virudhugal 2023	The sixth edition of Sun Kudumbam Viruthugal 2023 was aired as three parts, the first part being aired on 11 June, the second on 18 June and the third on 28 June. The hosts were Rishi, Diya Menon, VJ Aswath and Bavithra.	
28	Sun Kudumbam Virudhugal 2023	The sixth edition of Sun Kudumbam Viruthugal 2023 was aired as three parts, the first part being aired on 11 June, the second on 18 June and the third on 28 June. The hosts were Rishi, Diya Menon, VJ Aswath and Bavithra.	

Date	Event	Notes	Ref
14	8th Annual Vijay Television Awards	The award function was two parts, the first part being aired on 14 May and the second on 21 May. The hosts were Nakshathra Nagesh, Ma Ka Pa Anand, Erode Mahesh and Priyanka Deshpande.	
21	8th Annual Vijay Television Awards	The award function was two parts, the first part being aired on 14 May and the second on 21 May. The hosts were Nakshathra Nagesh, Ma Ka Pa Anand, Erode Mahesh and Priyanka Deshpande.	

=== November ===
Date	Event	Notes	Ref
5	Zee Tamil Kudumbam Viruthugal 2023	This is an awards ceremony held to honour the cast and crew of the Tamil television serials which air on Zee Tamil.	
12	Zee Tamil Kudumbam Viruthugal 2023	This is an awards ceremony held to honour the cast and crew of the Tamil television serials which air on Zee Tamil.	

== New series and shows ==
=== Soap operas ===
January–June

Opening		Title	Tamil title	Network(s)	Timing	Ref
January	23	Siragadikka Aasai	சிறகடிக்க ஆசை	Star Vijay	Ongoing	
January	23	Mahanadhi	மகாநதி	Star Vijay	Ended	
January	23	Chinnathayaval	சின்னத்தாயவள்	Blacksheep TV	Ended	
January	23	Ennadi Mayavi	என்னடி மாயாவி	Blacksheep TV	Ended	
January	25	Paadhi Kaadhal Paadhi Drogam	பாதி காதல் பாதி துரோகம்	Colors Tamil	Ended	
January	25	London Naatkal	லண்டன் நாட்கள்	Colors Tamil	Ended	
January	25	Thoda Thoda Ragasiyam	தொட தொட ரகசியம்	Colors Tamil	Ended	
January	30	Zombie Kadhali	சோம்பி காதலி	Astro Vinmeen HD	Ended	
February	6	Kaalavarai	காலவரை	Mediacorp Vasantham	Ended	
February	6	Bharathi Kannamma 2	பாரதி கண்ணம்மா 2	Star Vijay	Ended	
February	13	Cyber War	சைபர் வார்	Colors Tamil	Ended	
February	13	Memories	மெமோரிஸ்	Colors Tamil	Ended	
February	13	Time Out	டைம் அவுட்	Colors Tamil	Ended	
February	20	Seetha Raman	சீதா ராமன்	Zee Tamil	Ended	
February	20	Anandham	ஆனந்தம்	Kalaignar TV	Ended	
February	21	Yaar? 4	யார்? 4	Mediacorp Vasantham	Ended	
February	27	Malar	மலர்	Sun TV	Ended	
March	6	Mr. Manaivi	மிஸ்டர் மனைவி	Sun TV	Ended	
March	8	Manmadha Bullets Reloaded	மன்மதா தோட்டாக்கள் ரீலோடட்	Astro Vinmeen HD	Ended	
March	20	Aaha Kalyanam	ஆஹா கல்யாணம்	Star Vijay	Ended	
March	20	Yaaro Ivan	யாரோ இவன்	Blacksheep TV	Ended	
March	27	Ponni	பொன்னி	Star Vijay	Ended	
March	27	Naagini 6	நாகினி 6	Colors Tamil	Ended	
March	27	Pishachini	பிசாசினி	Colors Tamil	Ended	
April	3	Bommi Babl	பொம்மி பிஏபிஎல்	Colors Tamil	Ended	
April	3	Athisaya Piravi	அதிசயப் பிறவி	Blacksheep TV	Ended	
April	17	Pasanga series	பசங்க சீரிஸ்	Astro Vinmeen HD	Ended	
April	24	Modhalum Kaadhalum	மோதலும் காதலும்	Star Vijay	Ended	
May	8	Sandakozhi	சண்டக்கோழி	Zee Tamil	Ended	
May	17	Dear Diary	டியர் டைரி	Mediacorp Vasantham	Ended	
May	18	Vinaivazhi	வினைவழி	Mediacorp Vasantham	Ended	
May	22	Anna	அண்ணா	Zee Tamil	Ended	
June	26	Pudhu Vasantham	புதுவசந்தம்	Sun TV	Ongoing	
June	26	Ennadi Mayavi	என்னடி மாயாவி	Blacksheep TV	Ended	
June	26	Yaaro Ivan	யாரோ இவன்	Blacksheep TV	Ended	
June	26	Rani Comics	இராணி காமிக்ஸ்	Blacksheep TV	Ended	
June	26	Avalum Naanum	அவளும் நானும்	Blacksheep TV	Ended	

==== July–December ====
Opening		Title	Tamil title	Network(s)	Time	Ref
July	3	Perazhagi 2	பேரழகி 2	Colors Tamil	Ended	
July	3	Archanai Pookal	அர்ச்சனை பூக்கள்	Colors Tamil	Ended	
July	4	Uppuroti Chidambaram	உப்புரொட்டி சிதம்பரம்	Astro Vaanavil	Ended	
July	17	Ranjithame	ரஞ்சிதாமே	Kalaignar TV	Ended	
July	24	Meena	மீனா	Sun TV	Ended	
August	7	Kizhakku Vaasal	கிழக்கு வாசல்	Star Vijay	Ended	
August	28	Idhayam	இதயம்	Zee Tamil	Ongoing	
September	2	Ayya Veedu	ஐயா வீடு	Vasantham TV	Ended	
October	2	Anbin Aaram	அன்பின் ஆரம்	Vasantham TV	Ended	
October	9	Nala Damayanthi	நள தமயந்தி	Zee Tamil	Ended	
October	9	Sandhya Raagam	சந்தியா ராகம்	Zee Tamil	Ongoing	
October	9	Singapennae	சிங்கப்பெண்ணே	Sun TV	Ongoing	
October	23	Sandhiya	சந்தியா	DD Podhigai	Ended	
October	30	Poova Thalaya	பூவா தலையா	Sun TV	Ended	
October	30	Pandian Stores 2	பாண்டியன் ஸ்டோர்ஸ் 2	Star Vijay	Ongoing	
November	13	Nee Naan Kaadhal	நீ நான் காதல்	Star Vijay	Ended	
November	13	1943: Kappaleriya Thamizhan	கப்பலேறிய தமிழன்	Vasantham TV	Ended	
December	4	Sakthivel: Theeyaai Oru Theeraa Kaadhal	சக்திவேல்	Star Vijay	Ended	
December	22	Pachaipudavaikari	பச்சைபுடவைக்காரி	Polimer TV	Ended	

=== Shows ===
January–June

Opening		Title	Tamil title	Network(s)	Status	Ref
January	1	Vasantham Star 2023	வசந்தம் ஸ்டார் 2023	Mediacorp Vasantham	Ended	
January	15	Alayam Ayiram	ஆலயம் ஆயிரம்	Blacksheep TV	Ended	
January	15	Anpudan Archanai	அன்புடன் அர்ச்சனை	Blacksheep TV	Ended	
January	15	Good Morning Blacksheep	குட் மார்னிங் பிளாக்ஷீப்	Blacksheep TV	Ended	
January	18	Kattathu Rani	கட்டத்து ராணி	Blacksheep TV	Ended	
January	18	Nikki Raid	நிக்கி ரெயிட்	Blacksheep TV	Ended	
January	18	Adichi Thukku Machi	அடிச்சி தூக்கு மச்சி	Blacksheep TV	Ended	
January	22	Super Kudumbam 3	சூப்பர் குடும்பம் 3	Sun TV	Ended	
January	28	Cooku with Comali 4	குக் வித் கோமாளி 4	Star Vijay	Ended	
February	5	Super Jodi	சூப்பர் ஜோடி	Zee Tamil	Ended	
February	5	Comedy Gajana	காமெடி கஜானா	Blacksheep TV	Ended	
February	11	Acham Yenbathu Madamaiyada 3	அச்சம் என்பது மடமையடா 3	Mediacorp Vasantham	Ended	
February	13	Gang Stars	கேங் ஸ்டார்ஸ்	Blacksheep TV	Ended	
February	19	Kalakka Povathu Yaaru? Champions 4	கலக்க போவது யாரு சாம்பியன்	Star Vijay	Ended	
February	19	Makkal En Pakkam	மக்கள் என் பக்கம்	Adithya TV	Ended	
February	19	Rocket Raja	ராக்கெட் ராஜா	Adithya TV	Ended	
February	26	Ranjithame	ரஞ்சிதமே	Sun TV	Ended	
March	5	Adithya Galatta	ஆதித்யா கலாட்டா	Adithya TV	Ended	
March	11	Nee Urutttu Machi	நீ உருட்டு மச்சி	Adithya TV	Ended	
March	26	Start Music 4	ஸ்டார்ட் மியூசிக்	Star Vijay	Ended	
April	16	Tamil Pechu Engal Moochu	தமிழ் பேச்சு எங்கள் மூச்சு	Star Vijay	Ended	
April	24	Varuthapadatha Sangam	வருத்தப்படாத சங்கம்	Sun TV	Ended	
May	19	Panas Talk With Vikadakavi	விகடகவியுடன் பனாஸ் பேச்சு	Astro Vinmeen HD	Ended	
May	20	Kanavu Meipada 3	கனவு மெய்பட 3	Mediacorp Vasantham	Ended	
June	11	Vaa Tamizha Vaa	வா தமிழா வா	Kalaignar TV		
June	11	Ready Steady Po 3	ரெடி ஸ்டெடி போ 3	Star Vijay	Ended	

==== July–December ====
Opening		Title	Tamil title	Network(s)	Status	Ref
July	1	Sa Re Ga Ma Pa Lil Champs 3	சா ரி க ம ப லிட்டில் சாம்பியன்ஸ் 3	Zee Tamil	Ended	
July	2	Super Singer Junior 9	சூப்பர் சிங்கர் ஜூனியர் சீசன் 9	Star Vijay	Ended	
July	23	Ranjithame 2	ரஞ்சிதமே 2	Sun TV	Ended	
July	29	Kadhanayagi	கதாநாயகி	Star Vijay	Ended	
August	13	Takkaru Takkaru	டக்கர் டக்கர்	Zee Tamil	Ended	
August	19	Kadalora Payanam	கடலோர பயணம்	Vasantham TV	Ended	
September	18	Savaal Sapthaswaram	சவால் சப்தஸ்வரம்	Vasantham TV	Ended	
October	2	Bigg Boss 7	பிக் பாஸ் 7	Star Vijay	Ended	
October	29	Oo Solriya Oo Oohm Solriya 2	ஊ சொல்றியா ஓஓஓம் சொல்றியா	Star Vijay	Ended	
November	19	Anda Ka Kasam 2	அண்டாகாகசம் 2	Star Vijay	Ended	
December	2	Vivegam 3	விவேகம் 3	Vasantham TV	Ended	
December	12	Enna Kodumai	என்னா கொடுமை	Vasantham TV	Ended	
December	16	Super Singer 10	சூப்பர் சிங்கர் 10	Star Vijay	Ended	
December	17	Ranjithame 3	ரஞ்சிதமே 3	Sun TV	Ended	
December	23	Dance Jodi Dance Reloaded 2	டான்ஸ் ஜோடி டான்ஸ் ரீலோடட் 2	Zee Tamil	Ended	

== Debut web series ==
Opening		Title	Tamil title	Director	Platform	Ref
January	6	Story of Things	ஸ்டோரி ஆஃப் திங்ஸ்	Vinoth Kishan, Anshita Anand, Aditi Balan, Gautami Tadimalla	SonyLIV	
January	20	Joking Bad	ஜோக்கிங் பேட்	Swaminathan, Manohar, Jeeva, Seshu	Netflix India	
January	26	Ayali	அயலி	Abi Nakshatra, Anumol, Madhan, Linga, Singampuli	Zee5	
January	27	Engga Hostel	எங்க ஹாஸ்டல்	Saranya Ravichandran, Avinaash Ramesh, Sacchin Nachiappan, Goutham Raj, Dravid Selvam	Amazon Prime Video	
February	24	Iru Dhuruvam 2	இரு துருவம் 2	Nandha Durairaj, Prasanna, Abhirami Venkatachalam, Linga	SonyLIV	
February	28	Maaya Thotta	மாய தோட்டா	Amit Bhargav, Chaitra Reddy, Kumaran Thangarajan	Hungama	
March	10	Accidental Farmer and Co	ஆக்சிடெண்டல் ஃபார்மர் அண்ட் கோ	Vaibhav Reddy, Ramya Pandian, Badava Gopi	SonyLIV	
March	24	Sengalam	செங்களம்	Kalaiyarasan, Vani Bhojan	Zee5	
April	21	Oru Kodai Murder Mystery	ஒரு கோடை மர்டர் மிஸ்டரி	Abhirami, Akash, Aishwarya, Raghav, John	Zee5	
April	22	Kana Kaanum Kaalangal 2	கானா காணும் காலங்கள் 2	Bharath, Sangeetha, Aravind Seiju, Raja Vetri Prabhu, Irfan	Disney+ Hotstar	
May	18	Modern Love Chennai	மாடர்ன் லவ் சென்னை	Bharathiraja, Balaji Sakthivel, Thiagarajan Kumararaja, Raju Murugan, Krishnakumar Ramakumar, Akshay Sundher	Amazon Prime Video	
July	6	Sweet Kaaram Coffee	ஸ்வீட் காரம் காபி	Bejoy Nambiar, Krishna Marimuthu, Swathi Raghuraaman	Amazon Prime Video	
August	8	Mathagam	மத்தகம்	Prasath Murugesan	Disney+ Hotstar	
August	10	Vera Maari Office	வேரா மாறி ஆபீஸ்	Chidambaram Manivannan	Aha Tamil	
September	15	MY3	மைதிரி	M. Rajesh	Disney+ Hotstar	
November	15	Label	லேபிள்	Arunraja Kamaraj	Disney+ Hotstar	
November	15	The Village	தி வில்லேஜ்	Milind Rau	Amazon Prime Video	

== Ending series and shows ==
=== Series ===
Ending		Title	Tamil title	Network(s)	First aired	Ref
January	9	Ullathai Allitha	உள்ளத்தை அள்ளித்தா	Colors Tamil	10 October 2022	
January	12	Jamelaa	ஜமீலா	Colors Tamil	10 October 2022	
February	4	Bharathi Kannamma	பாரதி கண்ணம்மா	Star Vijay	25 February 2019	
February	10	Paadhi Kaadhal Paadhi Drogam	பாதி காதல் பாதி துரோகம்	Colors Tamil	25 January 2023	
February	10	London Naatkal	லண்டன் நாட்கள்	Colors Tamil	25 January 2023	
February	10	Thoda Thoda Ragasiyam	தொட தொட ரகசியம்	Colors Tamil	25 January 2023	
February	20	Aathmaan	ஆத்மான்	Mediacorp Vasantham	21 December 2022	
February	25	Abhiyum Naanum	அபியும் நானும்	Sun TV	26 October 2020	
March	4	Kannana Kanne	கண்ணான கண்ணே	Sun TV	4 November 2020	
March	17	Rettai Roja	இரட்டை ரோஜா	Zee Tamil	12 August 2019	
March	17	Mouna Raagam 2	மௌன ராகம் 2	Star Vijay	1 February 2021	
March	17	Ennadi Mayavi	என்னடி மாயாவி	Blacksheep TV	23 January 2023	
March	25	Namma Veetu Ponnu	நம்ம வீட்டு பொண்ணு	Star Vijay	16 August 2021	
March	31	Ennadi Mayavi	என்னடி மாயாவி	Blacksheep TV	23 January 2023	
April	21	Raja Rani 2	ராஜா ராணி 2	Star Vijay	12 October 2020	
April	29	Rajini	ரஜினி	Zee Tamil	27 December 2021	
May	20	Kannathil Muthamittal	கன்னத்தில் முத்தமிட்டாள்	Zee Tamil	11 April 2022	
June	24	Thalattu	தாலாட்டு	Sun TV	26 April 2021	
July	1	Magarasi	மாகராசி	Sun TV	21 October 2019	
July	22	Thirumagal	திருமகள்	Sun TV	12 October 2020	
August	6	Bharathi Kannamma 2	பாரதி கண்ணம்மா 2	Star Vijay	6 February 2023	
August	26	Deivam Thantha Poove	தெய்வம் தந்த பூவே	Zee Tamil	13 December 2021	
September	30	Kaatrukkenna Veli	காற்றுக்கென்ன வேலி	Star Vijay	18 January 2021	
October	8	Thavamai Thavamirundhu	தவமாய் தவமிருந்து	Zee Tamil	18 April 2022	
October	28	Pandavar Illam	பாண்டவர் இல்லம்	Sun TV	15 July 2019	
October	28	Pandian Stores	பாண்டியன் ஸ்டோர்ஸ்	Star Vijay	1 October 2018	
November	11	Thendral Vandhu Ennai Thodum	தென்றல் வந்து என்னை தொடும்	Star Vijay	16 August 2021	
December	9	Kanne Kalaimaane	கண்ணே கலைமானே	Star Vijay	10 October 2022	

=== Shows ===
Ending		Title	Tamil title	Network(s)	First aired	Ref
January	1	Super Mom 3	சூப்பர் மாம் 3	Zee Tamil	4 September 2022	
January	8	Maathi Yosi	மாத்தி யோசி	Sun TV	27 February 2022	
January	22	Bigg Boss 6	பிக் பாஸ் 6	Star Vijay	9 October 2022	
February	12	Anda Ka Kasam 1	அண்டாகாகசம்	Star Vijay	14 August 2022	
March	19	Oo Solriya Oo Oohm Solriya	ஊ சொல்றியா ஓஓஓம் சொல்றியா	Star Vijay	4 September 2022	
March	26	Vasantham Star 2023	வசந்தம் ஸ்டார் 2023	Mediacorp Vasantham	1 1 January	
June	4	Super Jodi	சூப்பர் ஜோடி	Zee Tamil	5 February 2023	
August	4	Tamil Pechu Engal Moochu	தமிழ் பேச்சு எங்க மூச்சு	Star Vijay	16 April 2023	
October	1	Kadhanayagi	காதநாயகி	Star Vijay	29 July 2023	
October	6	Vanakkam Tamizha	வணக்கம் தமிழா	Sun TV	4 December 2017	
October	23	Ready Steady Po 3	ரெடி ஸ்டெடி போ 3	Star Vijay	11 June 2023	
November	12	Start Music 4	ஸ்டார்ட் மியூசிக் 4	Star Vijay	26 March 2023	
December	10	Ranjithame 2	ரஞ்சிதமே 2	Sun TV	23 July 2023	
December	10	Super Singer Junior 9	சூப்பர் சிங்கர் ஜூனியர் சீசன் 9	Star Vijay	8 July 2023	
December	17	Sa Re Ga Ma Pa Lil Champs 3	சா ரி க ம ப லிட்டில் சாம்பியன்ஸ் 3	Zee Tamil	1 July 2023	

== Milestone episodes ==
=== January–June ===
Episode air date		Title	Tamil title	Network(s)	Episode	Ref
January	2	Chellamma	செல்லம்மா	Star Vijay	200th	
January	10	Pandian Stores	பாண்டியன் ஸ்டோர்ஸ்	Star Vijay	1000th	
January	20	Ethirneechal	எதிர்நீச்சல்	Sun TV	300th	
January	24	Priyamaana Thozhi	பிரியமான தோழி	Sun TV	200th	
January	27	Thamizhum Saraswathiyum	தமிழும் சரஸ்வதியும்	Star Vijay	400th	
January	28	Kaatrukkenna Veli	காற்றுக்கென்ன வேலி	Star Vijay	600th	
February	2	Kayal	கயல்	Sun TV	400th	
February	3	Aruvi	அருவி	Sun TV	400th	
February	3	Abhiyum Naanum	அபியும் நானும்	Sun TV	700th	
February	4	Kanne Kalaimaane	கண்ணே கலைமானே	Star Vijay	100th	
February	6	Magarasi	மகராசி	Sun TV	900th	
February	6	Ilakkiya	இலக்கியா	Sun TV	100th	
February	7	Kannana Kanne	கண்ணான கண்ணே	Sun TV	700th	
February	7	Pandavar Illam	பாண்டவர் இல்லம்	Sun TV	1000th	
February	20	Raja Rani 2	ராஜா ராணி 2	Star Vijay	600th	
February	23	Anbe Vaa	அன்பே வா	Sun TV	700th	
February	28	Thirumagal	திருமகள்	Sun TV	700th	
February	28	Amudhavum Annalakshmiyum	அமுதவும் அன்னலட்சுமியும்	Zee Tamil	200th	
March	1	Eeramana Rojave 2	ஈரமான ரோஜாவே 2	Star Vijay	300th	
March	2	Rettai Roja	இரட்டை ரோஜா	Zee Tamil	1000th	
March	9	Sevvanthi	செவ்வந்தி	Sun TV	200th	
March	16	Maari	மாறி	Zee Tamil	200th	
March	17	Indira	இந்திரா	Zee Tamil	100th	
March	17	Kanaa	கனா	Zee Tamil	100th	
March	24	Rajini	ரஜனி	Zee Tamil	400th	
March	30	Thavamai Thavamirundhu	தவமாய் தவமிருந்து	Zee Tamil	300th	
March	30	Iniya	இனியா	Sun TV	100th	
April	20	Ponni C/O Rani	பொன்னி சி/ஓ ராணி	Kalaignar TV	250th	
April	20	Kannedhirey Thondrinal	கண்ணெதிரே தோன்றினாள்	Kalaignar TV	250th	
May	10	Pandian Stores	பாண்டியன் ஸ்டோர்ஸ்	Star Vijay	1200th	
May	20	Priyamaana Thozhi	பிரியமான தோழி	Sun TV	300th	
May	20	Ethirneechal	எதிர்நீச்சல்	Sun TV	400th	
June	17	Ponni C/O Rani	பொன்னி சி/ஓ ராணி	Kalaignar TV	300th	
June	17	Kannedhirey Thondrinal	கண்ணெதிரே தோன்றினாள்	Kalaignar TV	300th	
June	20	Thalattu	தாலாட்டு	Sun TV	700th	

=== July–December ===
Episode air date		Title	Tamil title	Network(s)	Episode	Ref
October	13	Ponni C/O Rani	பொன்னி சி/ஓ ராணி	Kalaignar TV	400th	
October	13	Kannedhirey Thondrinal	கண்ணெதிரே தோன்றினாள்	Kalaignar TV	400th	
October	13	Ranjithame	ரஞ்சிதமே	Kalaignar TV	75th	
October	13	Kizhakku Vasal	கிழக்கு வாசல்	Star Vijay	50th	
December	8	Anandha Ragam	ஆனந்தராகம்	Sun TV	400th	
December	19	Baakiyalakshmi	பாக்கியலட்சுமி	Star Vijay	1000th	

== Movie premieres of 2023 ==
=== January ===
Date	Film name	Channel	Notes	Ref
1
1	Cobra	Kalaignar TV	New Year premieres	
1	Agent Kannayiram	Sun TV	New Year premieres	
1	Bhamakalapam	Colors Tamil	New Year premieres	
1	Sita Ramam	Star Vijay	New Year premieres	
1	3:33	Vasanth TV	New Year premieres	
1	Kalathur Gramam	Polimer TV	New Year premieres	
8	Ponniyin Selvan: I	Sun TV		
8	Vilangu	Zee Tamil	Web series premiere	
14	Bheeshma	Star Vijay	Dubbed version of Malayalam movie	
15	Love Today	Kalaignar TV	Pongal premieres	
15	Vendhu Thanindhathu Kaadu	Kalaignar TV	Pongal premieres	
15	Coffee with Kadhal	Zee Tamil	Pongal premieres	
15	Kantara	Star Vijay	Pongal premieres	
15	Pattampoochi	Murasu TV	Pongal premieres	
16	Laththi	Sun TV	Pongal premieres	
16	Kaari	Zee Tamil	Pongal premieres	
17	Nitham Oru Vaanam	Colors Tamil		

=== February ===
Date	Film name	Channel	Notes	Ref
5	60 Vayadu Maaniram	Colors Tamil		
5	Naan Mirugamaai Maara	Sun TV		
12	Oru Adaar Love	Colors Tamil		
15	Mirugaa	Zee Tamil		
17	Mamangam	Zee Thirai		
19	Kuruthi Aattam	Colors Tamil		
26	Thuppakki Munai	Colors Tamil		
26	Raangi	Sun TV		

=== March ===
Date	Film name	Channel	Notes	Ref
5	Sita Ramam	Zee Tamil		
8	Kannitheevu	Colors Tamil	Direct television premiere	
11	DSP	Sun TV		
12	Indrajith	Colors Tamil		
12	DSP	Sun TV		
26	Ellam Mela Irukuravan Paathupan	Colors Tamil		
26	Brahmāstra: Part One – Shiva	Star Vijay		

=== April ===
Date	Film name	Channel	Notes	Ref
9	Valimai	Zee Tamil		
14	Varisu	Sun TV		
14	Naai Sekar Returns	Sun TV		
14	Raja Magal	Colors Tamil		

=== May ===
Date	Film name	Channel	Notes	Ref
7	Vaathi	Sun TV		

=== June ===
Date	Film name	Channel	Notes	Ref
30	Boo	Colors Tamil		

=== July ===
Date	Film name	Channel	Notes	Ref
16	Pattathu Arasan	Sun TV		

=== August ===
Date	Film name	Channel	Notes	Ref
13	Ponniyin Selvan: II	Sun TV		
15	Kasethan Kadavulada	Sun TV		
15	Kumari Mavattathin Thugs	Colors Tamil		

=== September ===
Date	Film name	Channel	Notes	Ref
17	Rudhran	Sun TV		
24	Bagheera	Sun TV		

=== October ===
Date	Film name	Channel	Notes	Ref
23	Maaveeran	Sun TV		

=== November ===
Date	Film name	Channel	Notes	Ref
5	Mumbaikar	Colors Tamil	Hindi-language film	
12	Jailer	Sun TV		
26	Appatha	Colors Tamil		

== Deaths ==
Date	Name	Age	Broadcast credibility	Refe
15 February	Hari	29	Television actor	
19 February	Mayilsamy	57	Actor	
21 March	Kovai Guna	60	Stand-up comedian	
4 April	Rockstar Ramani Ammal	69	Folk and playback singer	
3 May	Manobala	69	Actor, producer, film director, comedian	
15 May	Vijaylakshmi		Actress	
8 September	G. Marimuthu		Film director, actor	

== See also ==
- 2024 in Tamil television
- 2022 in Tamil television
- 2021 in Tamil television
- 2020 in Tamil television
- 2019 in Tamil television
- Television in Tamil language
