= Radikaa Sarathkumar filmography =

Radhika Sarathkumar is an Indian actress, film producer, film director and politician who predominantly works in Tamil and Telugu films and television. She also appeared in Malayalam, Hindi and Kannada films. She is the founder and Creative Producer of the Radaan Mediaworks India Limited and doing serials in most of the south Indian languages. She made her acting debut in 1978, with the Tamil film Kizhakke Pogum Rail. She made her Telugu film debut with Priya, However Nyayam Kavali was released first. She has acted in more than 280 movies till date and been the lead actress till 2000. She has been the leading television actress featuring herself as female lead since 2001 and 2018 and known to hold the 9:30pm slot and been always the slot leader all along in the years.She is known for versatile acting skills capable of handling old to young,brave to pity,pure typical village women to and her capablity to handle different tamil dialects like a native.

== Films ==
Key
†	Denotes films that have not yet been released

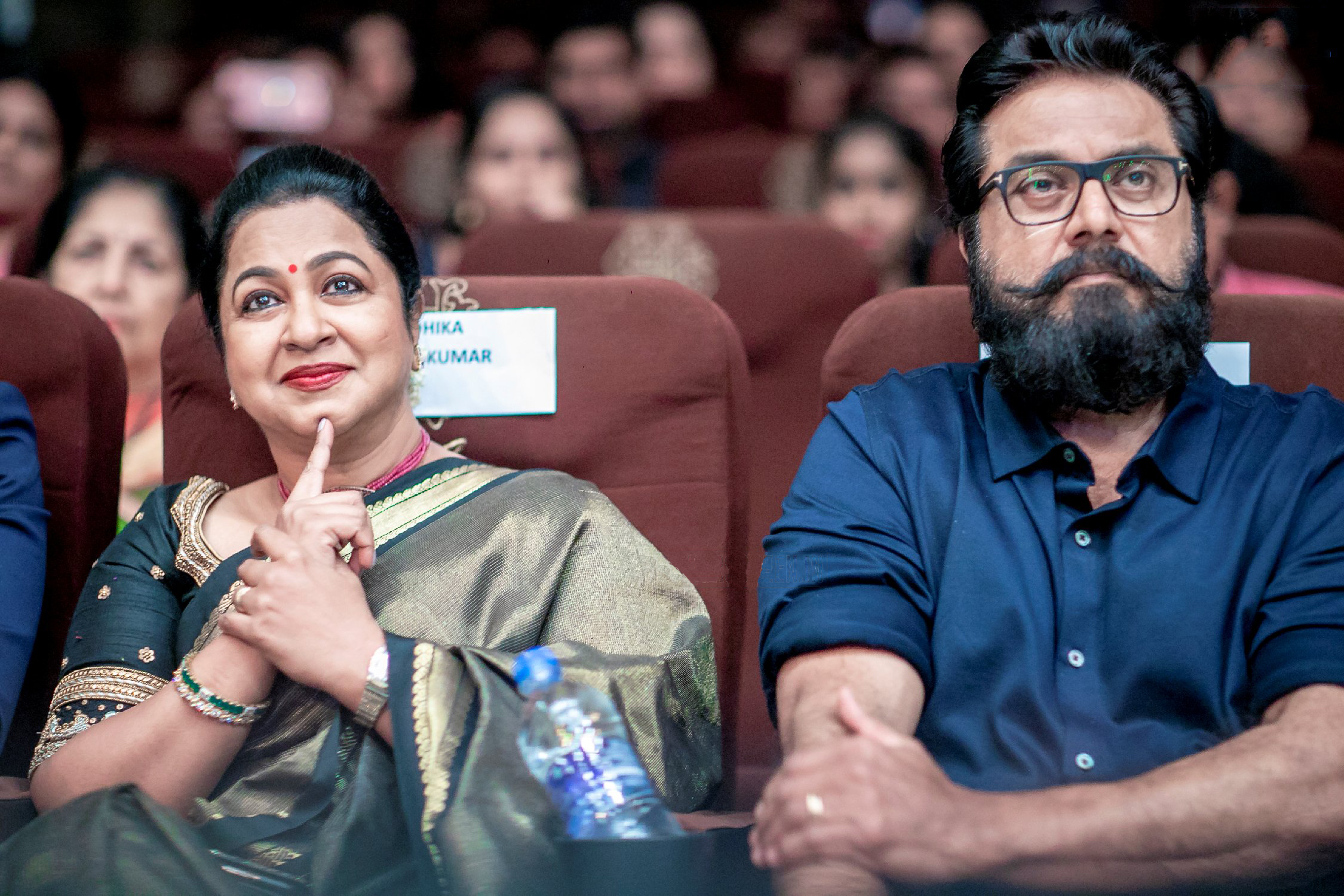
Radhika with her husband R. Sarathkumar at Vaanam Kottatum Movie Audio Launch.

=== Tamil ===
List of Radhika Sarathkumar Tamil film credits
Year	Title	Role	Notes
1978	Kizhakke Pogum Rail	Panchaali	Nominated—Filmfare Award for Best Actress – Tamil
1979	Inikkum Ilamai	Lakshmi	
1979	Niram Maaratha Pookkal	Radhika	
1979	Mugathil Mugam Parkalam		
1979	Velum Mayilum Thunai	Valli	
1979	Anbae Sangeetha	Geetha	
1980	Enga Ooru Rasathi	Anu	
1980	Soolam	Annamma	
1980	Anna Paravai	Usharani	
1980	Ethir Veetu Jannal	Urapatti	
1980	Aayiram Vaasal Idhayam	Neelu	
1980	Kalam Bathil Sollum	Rani	
1980	Bhama Rukmani	Bhama	
1980	Ilamai Kolam	Devi	
1980	Idhayaththil Ore Idam		
1980	Paruvathin Vasalile	Usha	
1980	Thai Ponggal	Selvi	
1980	Malargale Malarungal	Dr. Devi	
1980	Kumari Pennin Ullathile	Devi Bala	
1981	Kannitheevu	Selvi	
1981	Indru Poi Naalai Vaa	Jaya	
1981	Magarantham	Geetha	
1981	Thiruppangal		
1981	Rathathin Rathame		
1981	Nadhi Ondru Karai Moondru	Ponni	
1982	Pokkiri Raja	Rakkayi	
1982	Poi Satchi	Rukku	
1982	Vadivangal		
1982	Ranga	Ganga	
1982	Iniyavale Vaa	Rekha	
1982	Nandri, Meendum Varuga	Herself	Guest appearance
1982	Eera Vizhi Kaaviyangal	Radha	
1982	Moondru Mugam	Rekha	
1982	Metti	Preetha	
1982	Mamiyara Marumagala		
1983	Veetula Raman Veliyila Krishnan	Jaya	
1983	Neethibathi	Devi	
1983	Urangatha Ninaivugal	Gowri	
1983	Nenjodu Nenjam		
1984	Anbulla Rajinikanth	Herself	Guest appearance
1984	Dhavani Kanavugal	Subramani's love interest	
1984	Osai	Rani	
1984	Vamsa Vilakku	Radha	
1984	Nallavanuku Nallavan	Uma	
1984	Nilavu Suduvathillai	Shanthi / Charu	
1985	Paasa Paravaigal	Uma	
1985	Nermai	Radha	
1985	Pillai Nila	Dolli	
1985	Meendum Oru Kaathal Kathai	Sarasu	
1985	Pagal Nilavu	Thulasi	Cameo appearance
1985	Naane Raja Naane Mandhiri	Bhagyalakshmi	
1985	Neethiyin Marupakkam	Marikozhundhu	
1985	Naan Ungal Rasigan	Ranjani	
1985	Deiva Piravi	Janaki	
1985	Raja Rishi	Thilothamai	
1986	Dharma Devathai	Jhansi Rani	Won—Filmfare Award for Best Actress – Tamil
1986	Machakkaran		
1986	Sippikkul Muthu	Lalitha	
1987	Sirai Paravai	Valli	
1987	Rettai Vaal Kuruvi	Radha	
1987	Veerapandiyan	Meena	
1987	Neethikku Thandanai	Chithra, Sindhuja	Won—Filmfare Award for Best Actress – Tamil
1987	Puyal Paadum Paattu	Journalist	
1987	Per Sollum Pillai	Seetha	
1987	Oorkavalan	Vadivu	
1987	Uzhavan Magan	Selvi	
1988	Kaalaiyum Neeye Maalaiyum Neeye	Gowri	
1988	Sudhanthira Naattin Adimaigal	Bharathi	
1988	Poovum Puyalum	Indhu	
1988	Paadatha Thenikkal	Dr. Saradha	
1988	Therkathi Kallan	Radha	
1988	Paasa Paravaigal	Adv. Uma Shankar	
1988	Poonthotta Kaavalkaaran	Sivagami	Won—Tamil Nadu State Film Award Special Prize
1988	Poonthotta Kaavalkaaran	Sivagami	Nominated—Filmfare Award for Best Actress – Tamil
1988	Nallavan	Collector Ponni	
1988	Ithu Engal Neethi		
1988	Manamagale Vaa	Chitra / Rasathi	
1988	Thenpandi Seemayile	Rukkumani	
1988	Uzhaithu Vaazha Vendum	Sandhya	
1989	Thendral Sudum	Kalaa	
1989	Kaval Poonaigal	Geetha	
1989	Kai Veesamma Kai Veesu	Sudha	
1989	Uthama Purushan	Doctor	Guest appearance
1989	Paasa Mazhai	Ganga	
1989	Thaai Naadu	Julie	
1989	Idhu Unga Kudumbam		
1989	Ninaivu Chinnam	Bhagyam	Won—Tamil Nadu State Film Award for Best Actress
1990	Keladi Kanmani	Sharada	Won—Filmfare Award for Best Actress – Tamil
1990	Pagalil Pournami	Lakshmi	
1990	Pattanamdhan Pogalamadi	Mahalakshmi	
1992	Jodi Senthachu		
1992	Tamizh Ponnu	Vellathayi	
1992	Naane Varuven	Dr. Radhika	
1992	Kalikaalam	Janaki	
1993	Kizhakku Cheemayile	Virumaayi	Nominated—Filmfare Award for Best Actress – Tamil
1993	Puthiya Thendral	Gayathri	
1993	Karpagam Vanthachu	Karpagam	
1994	Varavu Ettana Selavu Pathana	Lakshmi	
1994	Namma Annachi	Gayathri	
1994	Pavithra	Pavithra	
1994	Pudupatti Ponnuthayi	Ponnuthayi	
1994	Mettupatti Mirasu	Meenakshi	
1994	Veera Padhakkam	Thangamma	
1995	Pasumpon	Nachiyar	Won—Tamil Nadu State Film Award Special Prize
1995	Pasumpon	Nachiyar	Nominated—Filmfare Award for Best Actress – Tamil
1995	Rani Maharani	Rani	Won—Tamil Nadu State Film Award Special Prize
1995	Puthiya Aatchi	Vivekanandan's wife	
1995	Villadhi Villain	Parvathi (Bombai Maami)	
1995	Udhavum Karangal	Bhavani	
1995	Raasaiyya	Madhavi	
1995	Naan Petha Magane	Indra	
1995	Ragasiya Police	Chief Minister of Tamil Nadu	
1996	Karuvelam Pookkal	Vadivu	
1997	Sakthi	Seethalakshmi	
1997	Suryavamsam	Latha Gounder	
1998	Kaadhale Nimmadhi	Bhagyam	
1998	Veera Thalattu	Pandian's mother	
1998	Jeans	Sundaramba	
1998	Golmaal	Herself	Guest appearance
1998	Sandhippoma	Vishwa's mother	
1998	En Aasai Rasave	Azhagurani	
1998	Senthooram	Devaatha	
1998	Ellame En Pondattithaan	Meenakshi	
1999	Kummi Paattu	Ramathaayi	
1999	Poomagal Oorvalam	Saravanan's adoptive mother	
1999	Sivan	Sivagami	
1999	Amarkkalam	Ganga	
1999	Ethirum Pudhirum	Dr. Jayanthi	
1999	Tajmahal	Maayan's aunt	
1999	Siragugal	Valli	Telefilm
2000	Sudhandhiram	Advocate Padmini	
2000	Karuvelam Pookkal	Vadivu	
2000	Puratchikkaaran	Village girl	Cameo appearance
2000	Uyirile Kalanthathu	Meenakshi	
2002	Roja Kootam	Malar	
2002	Thenkasi Pattanam	Doctor	Special appearance
2007	Kannamoochi Yenada	Dhamayanthi	
2008	Pandhayam	Masanam's Wife	
2008	Saroja	Herself	Special appearance
2012	Saguni	Ramani Aachi	
2013	Chennaiyil Oru Naal	Gautham's wife	
2014	Poojai	Rajalakshmi	
2015	Naanum Rowdydhaan	Inspector Meena Kumari	
2015	Thangamagan	Thamizh's mother	Won—Filmfare Award for Best Supporting Actress – Tamil; Won—SIIMA Award for Best Supporting Actress
2016	Theri	DCP Vijay Kumar's mother	Nominated—Filmfare Award for Best Supporting Actress – Tamil; Nominated—SIIMA Award for Best Supporting Actress
2016	Dharma Durai	Pandiyamma	
2017	Singam 3	Ramakrishna's wife	
2017	Mupparimanam	Herself	Cameo
2017	Sangili Bungili Kadhava Thorae	Parvathy	
2017	Ippadai Vellum	Madhu's mother	
2019	Mr Local	Easwari	
2019	Market Raja MBBS	Sundhari Bai	
2020	Vaanam Kottatum	Chandra	Won—SIIMA Award for Best Supporting Actress
2020	Vaanam Kottatum	Chandra	Nominated—Filmfare Award for Best Supporting Actress – Tamil
2021	Annabelle Sethupathi	Aryamala	
2021	Jail	Paapamma	
2022	Marutha	Meenakshi	
2022	Yaanai	Muthaaram	
2022	Kuruthi Aattam	Ganthimathi	
2022	Vendhu Thanindhathu Kaadu	Lakshmi	
2022	Love Today	Saraswathi	
2022	Pattathu Arasan	Vijaya	
2023	Run Baby Run	Sathya's mother	
2023	Ghosty	Spirit	Special Appearance
2023	Kolai	Rekha	
2023	Chandramukhi 2	Ranganayagi	
2023	Dhruva Natchathiram	Unknown	Unreleased
2024	Merry Christmas	Constable Laxmi	
2024	Little Jaffna	Amamma	
2025	Revolver Rita	Chellamma	
2026	Thaai Kizhavi	Pavunuthaayi "Thaai Kizhavi"	
2026	Vishwanath & Sons	Nirmala Devi	
2026	Pyaar Prema Kalyanam	Chandra Rani	
2026	Hi	Parimala	
2026	Enemy of the Smuggler		

=== Telugu ===
List of Radhika Sarathkumar Telugu film credits
Year	Title	Role	Notes
1981	Nyayam Kavali	Bharathi Devi	Won—Filmfare Award for Best Actress – Telugu
1981	Radha Kalyanam	Radha	
1981	Kirayi Rowdylu	Jyothi	
1981	Babulugaadi Debba	Gowri	
1981	Dabbu Dabbu Dabbu		
1981	Priya	Priya	
1982	Idi Pellantara		
1982	Vayyari Bhamalu Vagalamari Bhartalu	Chandramathi	
1982	Billa Ranga		
1982	Yamakinkarudu	Radha	
1982	Patnam Vachina Pativrathalu	Lalithamba	Nominated—Filmfare Award for Best Actress – Telugu
1982	Mondi Ghatam	Latha	
1982	Kayyala Ammayi Kalavaari Abbayi	Usha	
1982	Trisulam	Yadi	
1982	Mettala Savvadi		
1982	Eenadu		
1983	Prema Pichollu	Prema	
1983	Bezawada Bebbuli		
1983	Palletoori Monagadu	Santhi	
1983	Abhilasha	Archana	Nominated—Filmfare Award for Best Actress – Telugu
1983	Ramudu Kadu Krishnudu	Sarada	
1983	Sivudu Sivudu Sivudu		
1983	Puli Bebbuli	Sita's sister	
1983	Gudachari No.1	Rekha	
1983	Simhapuri Simham	Mrs. Rajasekharam	
1983	Todu Needa	Radha	
1983	Moodu Mullu		
1983	Raju Rani Jackie	Rani / Jackie	
1983	Mugguru Monagallu		
1984	Hero	Mrs. Rajasekharan	
1984	Srimathi Kaavali	Jaya	
1984	Yuddham	Raja's mother	
1984	Kondaveeti Nagulu	Kannamma	
1984	Bava Maradalu		
1984	Abhimanyudu		
1984	Ammayiloo! Preminchandi!		
1984	Punyam Koddi Purushudu	Radha	
1984	Anubandham	Malli	
1984	Gruhalakshmi		
1985	Mangalya Balam		
1985	Jwala		
1985	Ragile Gundelu	Radha	
1985	Illale Devata	Lakshmi	
1986	Swathi Muthyam	Lalitha	Nominated—Filmfare Award for Best Actress – Telugu
1986	Jeevana Poratam		
1986	Bandham		
1986	Santhi Nivasam	Lalitha	
1986	Jailu Pakshi		
1986	Ravana Brahma	Radhika	
1986	Ukku Manishi	Radha	
1986	Kotigadu		
1986	Aranyakanda	Poornima	
1987	Donga Mogudu	Seetha	
1987	Sardar Dharmanna		
1987	Ummadi Mogudu		
1987	Rowdy Police		
1987	Karthika Pournami		Won—Nandi Award for Best Supporting Actress
1987	Aradhana	Gangamma	
1987	Trimurtulu		Cameo
1987	Aatma Bandhuvulu		
1987	America Abbayi		
1987	Nyayaniki Sankellu	Viplava	
1987	Marana Homam		
1988	Aanimuthyam	Prasanthi	
1988	Anna Chellelu	Radha	
1988	Dharma Teja	Sampoorna	
1990	Raja Vikramarka	Maya	
1990	Idem Pellam Baboi	Jhansi	
1992	Swathi Kiranam	Sarada	
1992	College Bullodu	Saraswathi	
1994	Palnati Pourusham	Maya	Nominated—Filmfare Award for Best Actress – Telugu
1997	Aaro Pranam		
1997	Kutumba Gouravam		
1998	Suryavamsam	Vasundhara	
1998	Abhishekam	Vijay's Mother	
1998	Arundhati		
1998	Prema Katha	Subhadra	Won—Nandi Award for Best Supporting Actress
2000	Vamsoddharakudu	Varalakshmi	
2017	Raja the Great	Constable Anantha Lakshmi	Nominated—SIIMA Award for Best Supporting Actress (Telugu)
2022	Aadavallu Meeku Joharlu	Aadhi Lakshmi	
2022	Krishna Vrinda Vihari	Amruthavalli	
2023	Aadikeshava	Balu's adoptive mother	
2024	Operation Raavan	Jeevitha	
2025	Meghalu Cheppina Prema Katha	Kamakshi Shankaramurthy	
2026	S Saraswathi	Dr. Tulasi	
2026	Comrade Kalyan	Saraswatamma	

=== Hindi ===
List of Radhika Sarathkumar Hindi film credits
Year	Title	Role	Notes
1979	Hamare Tumhare	Sonia	
1980	Apne Paraye	Leela	
1986	Asli Naqli	Vijay's sister	
1986	Naseeb Apna Apna	Chando Singh	
1987	Kudrat Ka Kanoon	Aarti Verma / Miss Julie Singh	
1990	Aaj Ka Arjun	Laxmi	Nominated—Filmfare Award for Best Supporting Actress
1990	Mera Pati Sirf Mera Hai	Roopa P. Chandra	
1993	Tum Karo Vaada	Soniya	
1998	Himmatwala	Kiran	
1999	Lal Baadshah	Mrs. Ranbhir Singh	

=== Malayalam ===
List of Radhika Sarathkumar Malayalam film credits
Year	Title	Role	Notes
1977	Swarna Medal		
1979	Bharyaye Aavashyamundu		
1983	Justice Raja	Anitha	
1985	Koodum Thedi	Devi	
1985	Makan Ente Makan	Sujatha	
1991	Chavettupada		
1993	Arthana	Bharathi	
2017	Ramaleela	Ragini	
2019	The Gambinos	Mariamma	
2019	Ittymaani: Made in China	Annamma Plamootil	
2024	Pavi Caretaker	Mariamma	

=== Kannada ===
List of Radhika Sarathkumar Kannada film credits
Year	Title	Role	Notes
1983	Prachanda Kulla	Pushpa	
1985	Jeevana Chakra	Uma	
1987	Sathyam Shivam Sundaram		
1991	Nagini	Doctor Revathi	

=== Dubbing artist ===
List of Radhika Sarathkumar film dubbing credits
Year	Title	Actress	Language
1985	Mudhal Mariyathai	Radha	Tamil
1986	Vikram	Lissy	Tamil
1986	Kadalora Kavithaigal	Ranjini	Tamil
1988	Senthoora Poove	Nirosha	Tamil
1990	Inaindha Kaigal	Nirosha	Tamil
1994	Karuthamma	Rajashree	Tamil

== Television ==
=== Serials ===
List of Radhika Sarathkumar television serial credits
Year	Title	Role	Channel	Language	Notes
1991	Penn		DD	Tamil	
1995	Viduthalai		DD	Tamil	
1997	Naalavathu Mudichu		DD	Tamil	
1997–1998	Marupiravi	Bhuvaneshwari	Sun TV	Tamil	
1998–2000	Idhi Katha Kadu	Vasudha	ETV	Telugu	
1999–2001	Chithi	Saradha and Sakthi	Sun TV	Tamil	
2002–2005	Annamalai	Annamalai	Sun TV	Tamil	
2005–2006	Selvi	Selvi	Sun TV	Tamil	
2007–2009	Arasi	Senthamizharasi and Selvi	Sun TV	Tamil	
2007	Ammayi Kaapuram	Bhavani Devi	Gemini TV	Telugu	Extended Cameo Appearance
2009–2013	Chellamay	Chellamma	Sun TV	Tamil	
2010–2012	No.23 Mahalakshmi Nivasam	Mahalakshmi	Gemini TV	Telugu	
2013–2018	Vaani Rani	Vaani and Rani	Sun TV	Tamil	
2014	Puriyaamal Pirinthom	Priya	Vasantham	Tamil	Singaporean Tamil drama
2018–2019	Chandrakumari	Chandrakumari	Sun TV	Tamil	
2020–2021	Chithi 2	Saradha	Sun TV	Tamil	
2022–2024	Ponni C/O Rani	Vaani and Rani	Kalaignar TV	Tamil	Extended Dual Cameo Appearance
2024–present	Thayamma Kudumbathaar	Thayamma	DD Tamil	Tamil	
2026	7-10 Ivanga Namma Neram Set	Ganga Devi	Zee Tamil	Tamil	Cameo Appearance; Promo only

=== Shows ===
List of Radhika Sarathkumar television show credits
Year	Title	Role	Channel	Language	Notes
2007	Bangaram Mee Kosam	Host	Gemini TV	Telugu	
2012	Kaiyil Oru Kodi - Are You Ready?	Contestant	Sun TV	Tamil	
2014	Koffee with DD	Guest	Vijay TV	Tamil	
2015	Ninaithale Inikkum	Guest	Vendhar TV	Tamil	
2016	Good Morning Tamizha	Guest	Puthuyugam TV	Tamil	Diwali Special
2018	Vaani Rani Kondattam	Herself	Sun TV	Tamil	Special Show
2018	Vanakkam Tamizha	Guest	Sun TV	Tamil	Christmas Special
2019–2020	Kodeeswari	Host	Colors Tamil	Tamil	
2020	Natchathira Jodi	Guest	Sun TV	Tamil	
2020	Chithi 2 Special	Herself	Sun TV	Tamil	Special Show
2022	Wow 3	Participant	ETV	Telugu	Game Show
2022	Alitho Saradaga	Guest	ETV	Telugu	
2022	Jamelaa Oru Munnottam	Herself	Colors Tamil	Tamil	Special Show
2022	Unstoppable With NBK Season 2	Guest	Aha Telugu	Telugu	
2023	Kadhanayagi	Judge	Star Vijay	Tamil	
2026	Aata	Judge	Zee Telugu	Telugu	
2026	Mahanadigai 2	Judge	Zee Tamil	Tamil	

=== Other works ===
List of Radhika Sarathkumar other performing arts credits
Year	Title	Role	Channel	Language	Notes
1997	Naalavathu Mudichu	Director	DD	Tamil	Also Screenplay
1999	Siragugal	Valli	Sun TV	Tamil	Television film, also director
2022	Gaalivaana	Saraswathi	ZEE5	Telugu	Web series
2024	Thalaimai Seyalagam	Producer	ZEE5	Tamil	Web series
2024	Nayanthara: Beyond the Fairytale	Herself	Netflix	English; Tamil; Malayalam	Documentary film
