= 2021 in Tamil television =

The following is a list of events affecting Tamil language television in 2021 from India (Tamil Nadu), Singapore, Malaysia, Sri Lanka and the Tamil diaspora. Events listed include television show debuts and finales; channel launches and closures; stations changing or adding their network affiliations; and information about changes of ownership of channels or stations.

== Events and new channels ==
=== April ===
Date	Event	Ref
18	6th Vijay Television Awards; The award function was hosted by Dhivyadharshini, Ma Ka Pa Anand, Erode Mahesh and Priyanka Deshpande. It was telecasted on 18 April 2021.	

== Debut series and shows ==
=== Soap operas ===
Opening		Title	Tamil title	Network(s)	Finale	Status	Ref
January	4	Sillunu Oru Kaadhal	சில்லுனு ஒரு காதல்	Colors Tamil		Ended	
January	4	Paavam Ganesan	பாவம் கணேசன்	Star Vijay		Ended	
January	4	Serial Pei	சீரியல் பெய்	Astro Vinmeen HD	29 January	Ended	
January	18	Kaatrukkenna Veli	காற்றுக்கென்ன வேலி	Star Vijay		Ended	
January	21	Naagini 5	நாகினி 5	Colors Tamil	2 April	Ended	
February	1	Mouna Raagam 2	மௌன ராகம் 2	Star Vijay		Ended	
February	5	Kalaiyarasi	கலையரசி	Mediacorp Vasantham	26 February	Ended	
February	7	Kaalam	காலம்	Mediacorp Vasantham	25 April	Ended	
February	8	Azhkiya Tamizh Magal 2	அழகிய தமிழ் மகள் 2	Mediacorp Vasantham	April	Ended	
February	22	Sundari	சுந்தரி	Sun TV		Ended	
February	22	Muttakku	முட்டாக்கு	Mediacorp Vasantham	11 May	Ended	
March	2	Irandu	இரண்டு	Mediacorp Vasantham	23 March	Ended	
March	22	Raja Paarvai	ராஜா பார்வை	Star Vijay	18 December	Ended	
March	22	Pudhu Pudhu Arthangal	புதுப்புது அர்த்தங்கள்	Zee Tamil		Ended	
March	29	Manmatha Ampu	மன்மத அம்பு	Mediacorp Vasantham	16 May	Ended	
April	3	Vanthathu Neeya	வந்தது நீயா	Colors Tamil	1 May	Ended	
April	5	Marmamedai	மர்ம மேடை	Mediacorp Vasantham		Ended	
April	12	Velammal	வேலம்மாள்	Star Vijay	10 June	Ended	
April	19	Chithiram Pesuthadi	சித்திரம் பேசுதடி	Zee Tamil		Ended	
April	19	Nee Varuvai Ena?	நீ வருவாய் என	Raj TV		Ended	
April	19	Anandhi	ஆனந்தி	Raj TV	26 November	Ended	
April	26	Thalattu	தாலாட்டு	Sun TV		Ended	
May	3	Bommi Babl	பொம்மி பிஏ.பிஎல்	Colors Tamil		Ended	
May	12	Mithaara	மித்தாரா	Mediacorp Vasantham	20 May	Ended	
June	7	Tamiletchumy	தமிழ்லட்சுமி	Mediacorp Vasantham		Ended	
July	12	Thamizhum Saraswathiyum	தமிழும் சரஸ்வதியும்	Star Vijay		Ended	
July	19	Abhi Tailor	அபி டெய்லர்	Colors Tamil		Ended	
August	1	Jothi	ஜோதி	Sun TV	1 August	Ended	
August	16	Namma Veetu Ponnu	நம்ம வீட்டு பொண்ணு	Star Vijay		Ended	
August	16	Thendral Vandhu Ennai Thodum	தென்றல் வந்து என்னைத் தொடும்	Star Vijay		Ended	
August	23	Ninaithale Inikkum	நினைத்தாலே இனிக்கும்	Zee Tamil		Ended	
October	18	Aruvi	அருவி	Sun TV		Ended	
October	18	Rajamannar Vagaiyara	ராஜமன்னர் வகையறா	Polimer TV	22 December	Canceled	
October	18	Yamini B.A.B.L.	யாமினி பி.ஏ.பி.எல்	Polimer TV		Canceled	
October	18	Aayiram Jenmangal	ஆயிரம் ஜென்மங்கள்	Polimer TV	24 December	Canceled	
October	18	Anbe Sivam	அன்பே சிவம்	Zee Tamil		Ended	
October	25	Sathya 2	சத்யா 2	Zee Tamil		Ended	
October	25	Oru Oorla Rendu Rajakumari	ஒரு ஊருல இரண்டு ராஜகுமாரி	Zee Tamil		Ended	
October	25	Kayal	கயல்	Sun TV		Ongoing	
November	15	Muthuzhagu	முத்தழகு	Star Vijay		Ended	
December	3	Peranbu	பேரன்பு	Zee Tamil		Ended	
December	3	Deivam Thantha Poove	தெய்வம் தந்த பூவே	Zee Tamil		Ended	
December	20	Vaidhegi Kaathirundhaal	வைதேகி காத்திருந்தாள்	Star Vijay		Cancelled	
December	27	Rajini	ரஜனி	Zee Tamil		Ended	
December	27	Vidhya No.1	வித்யா நம்பர் 1	Zee Tamil		Ended	

=== Shows ===
Opening		Title	Tamil title	Network(s)	Finale	Status	Ref
January	3	Thedal 2021	தேடல் 2021	Mediacorp Vasantham	21 March	Ended	
January	3	Murattu Singles	முரட்டு சிங்கிள்ஸ்	Star Vijay	9 May	Ended	
January	10	Bhajan Samraat	பஜன் சாம்ராட்	Colors Tamil	14 April	Ended	
January	21	Nee Pathi Naan Pathi 2	நீ பாதி நான் பாதி 2	Mediacorp Vasantham	15 April	Ended	
January	24	Super Singer 8	சூப்பர் சிங்கர் 8	Star Vijay	26 September	Ended	
January	25	Aayiram Malargale	ஆயிரம் மலர்களே	Mediacorp Vasantham	5 April	Ended	
February	1	Saagasa Club	சாகச கிளப்	Mediacorp Vasantham	25 March	Ended	
February	2	Sooda Oru Coffee	சூடா ஒரு காபி	Mediacorp Vasantham	6 April	Ended	
February	6	Karkka Kasadara	கற்க கசடற	Mediacorp Vasantham		Ended	
February	20	Vevegam 2	விவேகம் 2	Mediacorp Vasantham		Ended	
February	28	Colors Sunday Kondattam	சண்டே கொண்டாட்டம்	Colors Tamil	18 July	Ended	
March	28	Summa Kizhi	சும்மா கிழி	Sun TV	11 April	Ended	
March	28	Rowdy Baby	ரௌடி பேபி	Sun TV		Ended	
March	28	Rockstar	ராக்ஸ்டர்ஸ்	Zee Tamil	26 September	Ended	
April	24	Mr and Mrs Chinnathirai 3	மிஸ்டர் அண்ட் மிசஸ் சின்னத்திரை 3	Star Vijay	12 December	Ended	
May	2	BB Jodigal 1	பிக் பாஸ் ஜோடிகள்	Star Vijay	19 September	Ended	
May	9	Poova Thalaiya	பூவா தலையா	Sun TV		Ended	
June	1	Chellame	செல்லமே	Mediacorp Vasantham		Ended	
June	7	Thillukku Thuttu	தில்லுக்கு துட்டு	Mediacorp Vasantham		Ended	
July	27	Comedy Raja Kalakkal Rani	காமெடி ராஜா கலக்கல் ராணி	Star Vijay	14 November	Ended	
August	7	MasterChef India – Tamil	மாஸ்டர் செஃப் தமிழ் 1	Sun TV	14 November	Ended	
September	12	Survivor 1	சர்வைவர் தமிழ் 1	Zee Tamil	4 September 2021	Ended	
September	26	Master D Blaster	மாஸ்டர் டி பிளாஸ்டர்	Zee Tamil		Ended	
October	3	Bigg Boss 5	பிக் பாஸ் 5	Star Vijay		Ended	
October	10	Start Music 3	ஸ்டார்ட் மியூசிக் 3	Star Vijay		Ended	
November	21	Super Daddy	சூப்பர் டாடி	Star Vijay		Ended	
December	19	Super Singer 8	சூப்பர் சிங்கர் ஜூனியர் 8	Star Vijay		Ended	
December	26	Junior Super Star 4	ஜூனியர் சூப்பர் ஸ்டார்ஸ் 4	Zee Tamil		Ended	

== Debut web series ==
Opening		Title	Tamil title	Director	Platform	Ref
January	22	Kuruthi Kalam	குருதிகளம்	P. Rajapandi, Danush	MX Player	
February	12	Live Telecast	லைவ் டெலிகாஸ்ட்	Venkat Prabhu	Disney+ Hotstar	
February	12	Vadham	வேதம்	Venkatesh Babu	MX Player	
May	20	November Story	நவம்பர் ஸ்டோரி	Indhra Subramanian	Disney+ Hotstar	
August	6	Navarasa	நவரசா	Priyadarshan, Vasanth, Gautham Vasudev Menon, Bejoy Nambiar, Karthik Subbaraj, Sarjun KM, Karthick Naren, Arvind Swami, Rathindran R. Prasad	Netflix Tamil	

== Ending series and shows ==
=== Soap operas ===
Ending		Title	Tamil title	Network(s)	First aired	Ref
March	20	Sundari Neeyum Sundaran Naanum	சுந்தரி நீயும் சுந்தரன் நானும்	Star Vijay	22 July 2019	
April	3	Agni Natchathiram	அக்னி நட்சத்திரம்	Sun TV	27 May 2019	
April	9	Kaatrin Mozhi	காற்றின் மொழி	Star Vijay	7 October 2019	
April	24	Nila	நிலா	Sun TV	18 March 2019	
August	13	Anbudan Kushi	அன்புடன் குஷி	Star Vijay	27 January 2020	
August	14	Eeramana Rojave	ஈரமான ரோஜாவே	Star Vijay	9 July 2018	
August	21	Suryavamsam	சூர்யவசம்	Zee Tamil	21 September 2020	
August	22	Yaaradi Nee Mohini	யாரடி நீ மோகினி	Zee Tamil	24 April 2017	
October	24	Oru Oorla Oru Rajakumari	ஒரு ஊர்ல ஒரு ராஜகுமாரி	Zee Tamil	23 April 2018	
October	24	Sathya	சத்யா	Zee Tamil	4 March 2019	
November	13	Thaenmozhi B.A	தேன்மொழி பி.ஏ	Star Vijay	26 August 2019	

=== Shows ===
Ending		Title	Tamil title	Network(s)	First aired	Ref
July	24	Genes (season 3)	ஜீன்ஸ் 3	Zee Tamil	17 June 2018	

== Deaths ==
Date	Name	Age	Broadcast credibility
22 March	Venkatesh	55	Television actor (Pandian Stores, Bharathi Kannamma)

== See also ==
- 2023 in Tamil television
