= 2019 in Tamil television =

The following is a list of events affecting Tamil language television in 2021 from India (Tamil Nadu), Singapore, Malaysia, Sri Lanka and the Tamil diaspora. Events listed include television show debuts and finales; channel launches and closures; stations changing or adding their network affiliations; and information about changes of ownership of channels or stations.

== Debut series and shows ==
=== Soap operas ===
Opening		Title	Tamil title	Network(s)	Finale	Status	Ref
January	14	Uyire	உயிரே	Mediacorp Vasantham	31 March	Ended	
January	16	Rowthiram	ரௌத்ரம்	Mediacorp Vasantham	25 February	Ended	
January	21	Siva Manasula Sakthi	சிவா மனசுல சக்தி	Star Vijay	14 Marth	Ended	
January	21	Alavudeen	அலாவுதீன்	Polimer TV	30 August	Canceled	
January	21	Pavithra	பவித்ரா	Polimer TV	30 August	Canceled	
January	21	Magalir Mattum	மகளிர் மட்டும்	Polimer TV	30 August	Canceled	
February	4	Selvamgal	செல்வமகள்	Sun TV	28 July	Canceled	
February	4	Pourmani	பௌர்ணமி	Sun TV	28 July	Canceled	
February	18	Ilayathalapathy	இளைய தளபதி	Colors Tamil	29 March	Canceled	
February	18	Athma	ஆத்மா	Colors Tamil	1 September	Ended	
February	21	Thangamagal	தங்கமகள்	Sun Life		Canceled	
February	21	Mounam Pesiyathe	மௌனம் பேசியதே	Sun Life		Canceled	
February	25	Anjali	அஞ்சலி	Star Vijay	20 July	Ended	
February	25	Bharathi Kannamma	பாரதி கண்ணம்மா	Star Vijay	4 February 2023	Ended	
March	1	Muthal Parvai	முதல் பார்வை	Mediacorp Vasantham	29 March	Ended	
March	4	Bommalattam	பொம்மலாட்டம்	Mediacorp Vasantham	13 May	Ended	
March	4	Sathya	சத்யா	Zee Tamil	24 October 2021	Ended	
March	11	Kadaikutty Singam	கடைக்குட்டி சிங்கம்	Star Vijay	20 July	Ended	
March	11	Neeya 3	நீயா 3	Shakthi TV		Ended	
March	18	Nila	நிலா	Sun TV	24 April 2021	Ended	
April	1	Thari	தறி	Colors Tamil	16 November	Ended	
April	1	Malar	மலர்	Colors Tamil	16 November	Ended	
April	1	Kandukondain Kandukondain	கண்டுகொண்டேன் கண்டுகொண்டேன்	Zee Tamil	20 August 2020	Ended	
May	13	Kadhal Kalatta	காதல் கலாட்டா	Mediacorp Vasantham	8 July	Ended	
May	13	Arundhathi	அருந்ததி	Sun TV	9 November	Ended	
May	21	Agaram	அகரம்	Mediacorp Vasantham	29 July	Ended	
May	27	Agni Natchathiram	அக்கினி நட்சத்திரம்	Sun TV		Ended	
June	3	Tamil Selvi	தமிழ்ச்செல்வி	Sun TV	Canceled		
June	10	Myna	மைனா	Colors Tamil	21 December	Ended	
June	24	Piriyadha Varam Vendum	பிரியாத வரம் வேண்டும்	Zee Tamil		Ended	
July	1	Sandhiya	சந்தியா	Colors Tamil	20 October	Canceled	
July	8	Nachiyarpuram	நாச்சியார்புரம்	Zee Tamil	14 August 2020	Ended	
July	15	Pandavar Illam	பாண்டவர் இல்லம்	Sun TV	28 October 2023	Ended	
July	15	Ayutha Ezhuthu	ஆயுத எழுத்து	Star Vijay	18 September 2020	Ended	
July	15	Aruvathusinam	ஆறுவது சினம்	Mediacorp Vasantham	27 November	Ended	Ended
July	22	Sundari Neeyum Sundaran Naanum	சுந்தரி நீயும் சுந்தரன் நானும்	Star Vijay	20 March 2021	Ended	
August	5	Vidhi	விதி	Polimer TV		Canceled	
August	5	Sanakiya Sapatham	சாணக்கிய சபதம்	Polimer TV		Canceled	
August	5	Poove Sempoove	பூவே செம்பூவே	Kalaignar TV	20 December	Ended	
August	5	Dum Dum Dum	டும் டும் டும்	Kalaignar TV	20 December	Ended	
August	5	Run	ரன்	Sun TV	31 March 2020	Ended	
August	5	Singa Airlines	சிங்கா ஏர்லைன்ஸ்	Mediacorp Vasantham	16 September	Ended	
August	12	Rettai Roja	இரட்டை ரோஜா	Zee Tamil	17 March 2023	Ended	
August	19	Ethirneechal	எதிர் நீச்சல்	Captain TV		Canceled	
August	19	Suyamparam	சுயம்வரம்	Captain TV		Canceled	
August	19	Sathurangam	சதுரங்கம்	Captain TV		Canceled	
August	19	Thedi Vantha Thirumagal	தேடி வந்த திருமகள்	Captain TV		Canceled	
August	26	Thaenmozhi B.A	தேன்மொழி பி.ஏ	Star Vijay	13 November 2021	Ended	
September	9	Mundravathu Kann	மூன்றாவது கண்	Mediacorp Vasantham	28 September	Ended	
September	9	Srimad Bhagavatam	ஸ்ரீமத் பாகவதம்	Colors Tamil		Ended	
September	23	Rasaathi	ராசாத்தி	Sun TV	3 April 2020	Canceled	
September	23	Avatharam	அவதாரம்	Mediacorp Vasantham		Ended	
October	7	Kaatrin Mozhi	காற்றின் மொழி	Star Vijay	9 April 2021	Ended	
October	7	Thaazhampoo	தாழம்பூ	Star Vijay	27 December	Ended	
October	21	Magarasi	மகராசி	Sun TV	1 July 2023	Ended	
October	28	Raja Magal	ராஜாமகள்	Zee Tamil	27 November 2021	Ended	
November	4	Gokulathil Seethai	கோகுலத்தில் சீதை	Zee Tamil	14 May 2022	Ended	
November	4	Thillana	தில்லானா	Mediacorp Vasantham		Ended	
November	11	Arivaan	அறிவான்	Mediacorp Vasantham		Ended	
November	18	Naagini	நாகினி	Colors Tamil		Ended	
December	16	Chocolate	சாக்லேட்	Sun TV	25 March 2020	Canceled	

== See also ==
- 2023 in Tamil television
