= 2024 in Tamil television =

The following is a list of events affecting Tamil-language television in 2024 from India (Tamil Nadu), Singapore, Sri Lanka, Malaysia and the Tamil diaspora. Events listed include television show debuts and finales; channel launches and closures; stations changing or adding their network affiliations; and information about changes of ownership of channels or stations.

== Channels ==
Date	Channel	Notes	Ref
May 19	Thanthi One	Tamil-language general entertainment television channel scheduled to launch on 19 May.	

== Scheduled award ceremonies ==
2024 award ceremonies
Date	Event	Host(s)	Note(s)	Ref.
July 14	Ananda Vikatan Television Awards 2023	Rj Vijay; VJ Kalyani	This is an awards ceremony for excellence in television in Tamil Nadu. The event honors the most talented TV artists, reality shows, anchors and news anchors from major channels like Sun TV, Star Vijay, Zee Tamil, Kalaignar TV, Thanthi TV, News18 Tamil Nadu, Polimer News and News7 Tamil. Conceptualised and created by Ananda Vikatan.	
September 1	9th Vijay Television Awards	Ma Ka Pa Anand, Priyanka Deshpande	This iss an awards ceremony held to honor the cast and crew of Tamil television dramas and other shows which air on Star Vijay in Tamil Nadu.	
September 8	9th Vijay Television Awards	Ma Ka Pa Anand, Priyanka Deshpande	This iss an awards ceremony held to honor the cast and crew of Tamil television dramas and other shows which air on Star Vijay in Tamil Nadu.	
October 26	Zee Tamil Kudumbam Viruthugal 2024	Archana Chandhoke, RJ Vijay	This event is held each year and awards are given to the best entertainers for variety programs aired on Zee Tamil.	
October 27	Zee Tamil Kudumbam Viruthugal 2024	Archana Chandhoke, RJ Vijay	This event is held each year and awards are given to the best entertainers for variety programs aired on Zee Tamil.	

== Television shows ==
=== Drama series debuting in 2024 ===
Date	Show	Tamil title	Network(s)	Status	Ref
January / தை
19	Budget Kudumbam	பட்ஜெட் குடும்பம்	DD Tamil	Ended	
19	Thayamma Kudumbathaar	தாயம்மா குடும்பத்தார்	DD Tamil	Ended	
19	Shakthi IPS	சக்தி ஐபிஎஸ்	DD Tamil	Ended	
21	Mahakavi Bharathi	மகாகவி பாரதி	DD Tamil	Ended	
22	Thangamagal	தங்கமகள்	Star Vijay	Ended	
22	Chinna Marumagal	சின்ன மருமகள்	Star Vijay	Ongoing	
22	Ninaithen Vandhai	நினைத்தேன் வந்தாய்	Zee Tamil	Ended	
22	Gowri	கௌரி	Kalaignar TV	Ended	
February / மாசி
6	Vaan Varu Vaan	வான் வரு வான்	Mediacorp Vasantham	Ended	
26	Veera	வீரா	Zee Tamil	Ongoing	
March / பங்குனி
13	Pithamagan	பிதாமகன்	Mediacorp Vasantham	Ended	
18	Lakshmi	லட்சுமி	Sun TV	Ongoing	
April / சித்திரை
1	Kaavalan	காவலன்	Mediacorp Vasantham	Ended	
22	Veetuku Veedu Vaasapadi	வீட்டுக்கு வீடு வாசப்படி	Star Vijay	Ended	
29	Malli	மல்லி	Sun TV	Ongoing	
May / வைகாசி
6	Punnagai Poove	புன்னகை பூவே	Sun TV	Ended	
19	Anamika	அனாமிகா	Sun TV	Ended	
June / ஆனி
3	Veerasingam	வீரசிங்கம்	Mediacorp Vasantham	Ended	
10	Marumagal	மருமகள்	Sun TV	Ongoing	
12	Mei	மெய்	Mediacorp Vasantham	Ended	
24	Panivizhum Malarvanam	பனி விழும் மலர் வனம்	Star Vijay	Ended	
July / ஆடி
1	Nenjathai Killadhe	நெஞ்சத்தைக் கிள்ளாதே	Zee Tamil	Stopped	
15	Manamagale Vaa	மனமகளே வா	Sun TV	Ended	
August / ஆவணி
19	Moondru Mudichu	மூன்று முடிச்சு	Sun TV	Ongoing	
September / புரட்டாதி
2	Valliyin Velan	வள்ளியின் வேலன்	Zee Tamil	Ended	
16	Kanmani Anbudan	கண்மணி அன்புடன்	Star Vijay	Ongoing	
October / ஐப்பசி
3	Karuvanam	கருவனம்	Mediacorp Vasantham	Ended	
10	Kaathu Karuppu	காத்து கருப்பு	Mediacorp Vasantham	Ended	
14	Punitha	புனிதா	Sun TV	Ended	
November / கார்த்திகை
4	Mounam Pesiyadhe	மௌனம் பேசியதே	Zee Tamil	Ended	
4	Pavithra	பவித்ரா	Kalaignar TV	Ended	
4	Ranjani	ரஞ்சினி	Sun TV	Ended	
December / மார்கழி
2	Annam	அன்னம்	Sun TV	Ongoing	
23	Ethirneechal 2	எதிர்நீச்சல் 2	Sun TV	Ongoing	

=== Variety shows debuting in 2024 ===
Start	Show	Tamil title	Network(s)	Status	Ref
January / தை
7	Yaar Antha Star 2024	யார் அந்த ஸ்டார் 2024	Mediacorp Vasantham	Ended	
20	Jodi Are U Ready	ஜோடி ஆர் யூ ரெடி	Star Vijay	Ended	
February/மாசி
11	Big Stage Tamil 2	பிக் ஸ்டேஜ் தமிழ் 2	Astro Vinmeen HD	Ended	
26	Vaazhthu Kaatuvom	வாழ்ந்து காட்டுவோம்	Kalaignar TV	Ended	
March / பங்குனி
31	Athu Ithu Ethu	அது இது எது 3	Star Vijay	Ended	
April / சித்திரை
15	Mudhal Vanakkam	முதல் வணக்கம்	Star Vijay	Ended	
27	Sa Re Ga Ma Pa Seniors 4	ச ரெ கா மா பா சீனியர்ஸ் சீசன் 4	Zee Tamil	Ended	
27	Cooku with Comali season 5	குக்கு வித் கோமாளி சீசன் 5	Star Vijay	Ended	
28	Vaa Thamizha Vaa 3	வா தமிழா வா சீசன் 3	Kalaignar TV	Ongoing	
May / வைகாசி
19	Top Cooku Dupe Cooku	டாப் குக்கு டூப் குக்கு	Sun TV	Ended	
June / ஆனி
2	Tik Tik Tik	டிக் டிக் டிக்	Star Vijay	Ended	
2	Start Music season 5	ஸ்டார்ட் மியூசிக் 5	Star Vijay	Ended	
29	Mr. and Mrs. Chinnathirai season 5	மிஸ்டர் & மிசஸ் சின்னத்திரை 5	Star Vijay	Ended	
September / புரட்டாதி
9	Ninaithale Inikkum	நினைத்தாலே இனிக்கும்	Sun TV	Ended	
9	Sun Autograph	சன் ஆட்டோகிராப்	Sun TV	Ended	
15	Samayal Express	சமையல் எக்ஸ்பிரஸ்	Zee Tamil	Ended	
15	Company	கம்பெனி	Star Vijay	Ended	
22	Tamilodu Vilayadu Season 2	தமிழோடு விளையாட்டு 2	Kalaignar TV	Ended	
22	October / ஐப்பசி				
5	Mahanadigai	மகாநடிகை	Zee Tamil	Ended	
6	Mama Manasilaayo	மாமா மனசிலாயோ	Sun TV	Ended	
6	Naanga Ready Neenga Readya	நாங்க ரெடி நீங்க ரெடியா	Sun TV	Ended	
6	Bigg Boss Tamil 8	பிக் பாஸ் தமிழ் 8	Star Vijay	Ended	
November / கார்த்திகை
2	Sa Re Ga Ma Pa Tamil Li'l Champs 4	ச ரி க ம ப லிட்டில் சாம்பியன்ஸ் 4	Zee Tamil	Ended	
16	Super Singer Junior 10	சூப்பர் சிங்கர் ஜூனியர் சீசன் 10	Star Vijay	Ended	
17	MasterChef – Tamil 2	மாஸ்டர்செஃப் - தமிழ் 2	Kalaignar TV	Ended	
December / மார்கழி
1	Kalakka Povathu Yaaru? 10	கலக்க போவது யாரு? 10	Star Vijay	Ended	
29	Anda Ka Kasam 3	அண்டா கா கசம்	Star Vijay	Ended	

== Debut web series ==
Start	Show	Tamil title	Network(s)	Director	Ref
January / தை
12	Cheran's Journey	சேரனின் பயணம்	SonyLIV	Chearan	
12	Aaradhana	ஆராதனா	Vision Time Tamil	Arun	
March / பங்குனி
8	Heart Beat	ஹார்ட் பீட்	Disney+ Hotstar	Deepak Sundarrajan	
22	MasterChef – Tamil 2	மாஸ்டர்செஃப் - தமிழ் 2		SonyLIV	
29	Inspector Rishi	இன்ஸ்பெக்டர் ரிஷி	Amazon Prime	J.S. Nandhini	
May / வைகாசி
17	Thalaimai Seyalagam	தலைமை செயலகம்	ZEE5	Vasanthabalan	
30	Uppu Puli Kaaram	உப்பு புளி காரம்	Disney+ Hotstar	M Ramesh Bharathi	
July / ஆடி
26	Chutney Sambar	சட்னி சாம்பார்	Disney+ Hotstar	Radha Mohan	
August / ஆவணி
15	Vera Maari Office 2		Aha Tamil	Jaswini J	
16	My Perfectt Husband		Disney+ Hotstar	Thamira	
30	Kana Kaanum Kaalangal 3	கண காணும் காலங்கள் 3	Disney+ Hotstar		
September / புரட்டாதி
13	Goli Soda Rising	கோலி சோடா ரைசிங்	Disney+ Hotstar	S. D. Vijay Milton	
20	Thalaivettiyaan Paalayam	தலைவெட்டியான் பாளையம்	Amazon Prime	Naga	
October / ஐப்பசி
18	Snakes and Ladders		Amazon Prime		
25	Aindham Vedham	ஐந்தம் வேதம்	ZEE5	L. Nagarajan	
November / கார்த்திகை
29	Parachute	பாராசூட்	Disney+ Hotstar	Sridhar K.	

== Re-telecast and dubbed series ==
Start	Show	Original title	Network(s)	Ref
May / வைகாசி
13	Ramayanam	Shrimad Ramayan	Sun TV	
19	Bala Krishna	Baal Krishna	Thanthi One	
19	Ganapathiye Varuvaai	Vighnaharta Ganesh	Thanthi One	
19	Veera Aanchaneya	Sankat Mochan Mahabali Hanumaan	Thanthi One	
19	Ilavarasi	Re-telecast	Thanthi One	
19	Thamarai	Re-telecast	Thanthi One	
19	Chellamay	Re-telecast	Thanthi One	
19	Karnan	Suryaputra Karn	Thanthi One	
19	Gayathri	Ilayaval Gayathri	Thanthi One	
19	Porus	Porus	Thanthi One	
20	Ahilyabai	Punyashlok Ahilyabai	Thanthi One	
20	Vaadi Rasathi	Manjil Virinja Poovu	Thanthi One	
21	Thulasi C/O Krishnan	Tulsidham Ke Laddu Gopal	Thanthi One	
21	Bhagyajatakam	Bhagyajathakam	Thanthi One	
22	Thenaliraman	Thenali Rama	Thanthi One	
22	Vanampadi	Raakkuyil	Thanthi One	
23	Alavudeen	Aladdin – Naam Toh Suna Hoga	Thanthi One	
23	Koondukkili	Sthreepadam	Thanthi One	
24	Devi	Devi Adi Parashakti	Thanthi One	
24	Priyatha Varam Vendum	Priyapettaval	Thanthi One	
25	Garudan	Dharm Yoddha Garud	Thanthi One	
25	Ammu	Ammuvinte Amma	Thanthi One	
27	Nane Varuven	Pyar Ka Pehla Naam: Radha Mohan	Zee Tamil	
27	Lakshami Kalyanam	Bhagya Lakshmi	Zee Tamil	
June / ஆனி
3	Kaakkum Deivam Kali	Mahakali – Anth Hi Aarambh Hai	Colors Tamil	
3	Shivasakthi	Shiv Shakti – Tap Tyaag Tandav	Colors Tamil	

== Milestone episodes ==
Episode air date		Title	Tamil title	Network(s)	Episode	Ref
January	24	Anbe Vaa	அன்பே வா	Sun TV	1000th	
February	17	Pudhu Vasantham	புது வசந்தம்	Sun TV	200th	
March	16	Vanathai Pola	வானத்தை போல	Sun TV	1000th	
March	22	Meena	மீனா	Sun TV	200th	
May	15	Mr. Manaivi	மிஸ்டர். மனைவி	Sun TV	400th	
June	6					
June	6	Karthigai Deepam	கார்த்திகை தீபம்	Zee Tamil	500th	
June	7	Ninaithen Vandhai	நினைத்தேன் வந்தாய்	Zee Tamil	100th	
June	29	Sundari	சுந்தரி	Sun TV	1000th	

== Ending this year ==
=== Series ending in 2024 ===
End date	Show	Network(s)	Start date	Total episodes	Ref
20 January	Amudhavum Annalakshmiyum அமுதவும் அன்னலட்சுமியும்	Zee Tamil	4 July 2022	470	
20 January	Ponni C/O Rani பொன்னி சி/ஓ ராணி	Kalaignar TV	27 June 2022	483	
5 February	1943: Kappaleriya Thamizhan; 1943: கப்பலேறிய தமிழன்	Mediacorp Vasantham	29 November 2023	36	
19 April	Thamizhum Saraswathiyum தமிழும் சரஸ்வதியும்	Star Vijay	12 July 2021	717	
19 April	Kizhakku Vaasal கிழக்கு வாசல்	Star Vijay	7 August 2023	196	
28 April	Anbe Vaa அன்பே வா	Sun TV	2 November 2020	1102	
4 May	Seetha Raman சீதா ராமன்	Zee Tamil	20 February 2023	352	
5 May	Priyamaana Thozhi பிரியமான தோழி	Sun TV	30 May 2022	597	
11 May	Aruvi அருவி	Sun TV	18 October 2021	793	
25 May	Nala Damayanthi நள தமயந்தி	Zee Tamil	9 October 2023	196	
8 June	Ethirneechal எதிர்நீச்சல்	Sun TV	7 February 2022	744	
21 June	Modhalum Kaadhalum மோதலும் காதலும்	Star Vijay	24 April 2023	304	
13 July	Poova Thalaya பூவா தலையா	Sun TV	30 October 2023	218	
4 August	Meenakshi Ponnunga மீனாட்சி பொண்ணுங்க	Zee Tamil	1 August 2022	637	
17 August	Indira இந்திரா	Zee Tamil	21 November 2022	536	
17 August	Sandakozhi சண்டக்கோழி	Zee Tamil	3 April 2023	442	
17 August	Vanathai Pola வானத்தை போல	Sun TV	7 December 2020	1134	
14 September	Chellamma செல்லம்மா	Star Vijay	9 May 2022	726	
5 October	Muthazhagu முத்தழகு	Star Vijay	15 November 2021	888	
10 October	Meena மீனா	Sun TV	24 July 2023	368	
2 November	Kannedhirey Thondrinal கண்ணெதிரே தோன்றினாள்	Kalaignar TV	27 June 2022	726	
2 November	Kanaa கனா	Zee Tamil	21 November 2022	665	
3 November	Iniya இனியா	Sun TV	5 December 2022	646	
1 December	Sundari சுந்தரி	Sun TV	22 February 2021	1144	
14 December	Ranjithame ரஞ்சிதாமே	Kalaignar TV	17 July 2023	436	
22 December	Mr. Manaivi மிஸ்டர் மணிவி	Sun TV	6 March 2023	620	

=== Shows ending in 2024 ===
End date	Show	Network(s)	Start date	Total episodes	Ref
14 January	Bigg Boss 7 பிக் பாஸ் 7	Star Vijay	1 October 2023	106	
14 April	Dance Jodi Dance Reloaded 2 டான்ஸ் ஜோடி டான்ஸ் ரீலோடட்	Zee Tamil	23 December 2023		
12 May	Super Samayal சூப்பர் சமையல்	Sun TV	18 September 2022	71	
12 May	Ranjithame 3 ரஞ்சிதமே 3	Sun TV	17 December 2023	19	
19 May	Anda Ka Kasam 2 அண்டாகாகசம் 2	Star Vijay	19 November 2023	27	
21 June	Vaazhthu Kaatuvom வாழ்து காட்டுவோம்	Kalaignar TV	26 February 2024	100	
23 June	Super Singer 10 சூப்பர் சிங்கர் 10	Star Vijay	16 December 2023		
8 September	Athu Ithu Ethu 3 அது இது எது 3	Star Vijay	31 March 2024	24	
29 September	Top Cooku Dupe Cooku season 1 டாப் குக்கு டூப் குக்கு சீசன் 1	Sun TV	19 May 2024	20	
29 September	Cooku with Comali season 5 குக்கு வித் கோமாளி சீசன் 5	Star Vijay	27 April 2024	46	
20 October	Sa Re Ga Ma Pa Seniors season 4 ச ரி க ம பா சீனியர்ஸ் சீசன் 4	Zee Tamil	27 April	53	
17 November	Mr. and Mrs. Chinnathirai season 5 மிஸ்டர் & மிசஸ் சின்னத்திரை 5	Star Vijay	29 June	40	
24 November	Tik Tik Tik டிக் டிக் டிக்	Star Vijay	2 June	20	

== Shows changing networks ==
Show	Tamil title	Moved from	Moved to	Ref
MasterChef – Tamil 2	மாஸ்டர்செஃப் - தமிழ் 2	Sun TV	SonyLIV	

== Tamil serial remakes in other languages ==
=== Series ===
Original series	Language	Remake series	Premiere date	Channel	Ref
Chellamma	Telugu	Karthika Deepam 2	25 March 2024	Star Maa	
Siragadikka Aasai	Telugu	Gundeninda Gudigantalu	2 October 2023	Star Maa	
Siragadikka Aasai	Kannada	Aase	11 December 2023	Star Suvarna	
Siragadikka Aasai	Malayalam	Chempaneer Poovu	29 January 2024	Asianet	
Siragadikka Aasai	Hindi	Udne Ki Aasha	12 March 2024	Star Plus	
Siragadikka Aasai	Marathi	Sadhi Manasa	18 March 2024	Star Pravah	
Siragadikka Aasai	Bengali	Uraan	27 May 2024	Star Jalsha	
Pandian Stores 2	Malayalam	Santhwanam 2	17 June 2024	Asianet	
Pandian Stores 2	Telugu	Illu Illalu Pillalu	12 November 2024	Star Maa	
Ilakkiya	Malayalam	Mangalyam Thanthunanena	5 February 2024	Surya TV	
Singapennae	Kannada	Mynaa	19 February 2024	Udaya TV	
Singapennae	Telugu	Sivangi	25 March 2024	Gemini TV	
Deivamagal	Marathi	Thoda Tuza Ani Thoda Maza	17 June 2024	Star Pravah	
Seetha Raman	Kannada	Brahmagantu	17 June 2024	Zee Kannada	
Anna	Telugu	Maa Annayya	25 March 2024	Zee Telugu	
Anna	Marathi	Lakhat Ek Aamcha Dada	8 July 2024	Zee Marathi	
Anna	Kannada	Annayya	12 August 2024	Zee Kannada	
Kayal	Odia	Ama Jhanshi Apa	18 March 2024	Tarang TV	
Vanathai Pola	Odia	Atuta Bandhan	20 May 2024	Tarang TV	
Pandian Stores	Odia	Bada Bohu	5 August 2024	Tarang TV	
Naam Iruvar Namakku Iruvar	Hindi	Do Dooni Pyaar	28 August 2024	Star Plus	
Thendral Vandhu Ennai Thodum 2	Kannada	Neenadena 2	9 September 2024	Star Suvarna	
Marumagal	Telugu	Nuvve Kavali	23 September 2024	Gemini TV	
Moondru Mudichu	Telugu	Moodu Mullu	30 September 2024	Gemini TV	
Moondru Mudichu	Kannada	Nathicharami	4 November 2024	Udaya TV	
Malli	Telugu	Radha	30 September 2024	Gemini TV	
Metti Oli	Odia	Kanyadana	7 October 2024	Tarang TV	
Priyamaana Thozhi	Telugu	Sneham Kosam	14 October 2024	Gemini TV	
Pudhu Vasantham	Telugu	Maa Inti Devatha	14 October 2024	Gemini TV	
Roja	Kannada	Ninna Jothe Nanna Kathe	30 September 2024	Star Suvarna	
Eeramana Rojave 2	Marathi	Lagnanantar Hoilach Prem	16 December 2024	Star Pravah	

=== Shows ===
Original series	Language	Remake series	Premiere date	Channel	Ref
Oo Solriya Oo Oohm Solriya	Malayalam	Enkile Ennodu Para	26 October 2024	Asianet	

== Time changing ==
Show	Channel	Moved from	Moved to	Ref
Nee Naan Kaadhal நீ நான் காதல்	Star Vijay	13 November 2023 – 13 January 2024; Monday - Saturday 15:00	17 January 2024 – 23 August 2024; Monday - Friday 22:00	
Sandhya Raagam சந்தியா ராகம்	Zee Tamil	9 October 2023 – 19 January 2024; Monday - Friday 19:00	22 January 2024 - present Daily 21:30	
Seetha Raman சீதா ராமன்	Zee Tamil	20 February 2023 – 19 January 2024; Monday - Friday 19:30	22 January - 4 May 2024; Monday - Saturday 18:00	
Meenakshi Ponnunga மீனாட்சி பொண்ணுங்க	Zee Tamil	1 August 2022 – 21 January 2024; Daily 21:30	22 January 2024 - present Monday - Friday 19:00	
Nala Damayanthi நள தமயந்தி	Zee Tamil	9 October 2023 – 24 February 2024; Monday - Saturday 18:30	26 February - 25 May 2024; Daily 22:30	
Maari மாரி	Zee Tamil	4 July 2022 – 23 February 2024; Monday - Friday 20:00	26 February 2024 - present Monday - Saturday 18:30	
Meena மீனா	Sun TV	24 July 2023 – 16 March 2024; Monday - Saturday 12:00	18 March 2024 - present Monday - Saturday 11:00	
Aruvi அருவி	Sun TV	18 October 2021 – 16 March 2024; Monday - Saturday 14:30	18 March - 11 May 2024; Monday - Saturday 12:00	
Modhalum Kaadhalum மோதலும் காதலும்	Star Vijay	24 April 2023 – 19 April 2024; Monday - Friday 18:30	22 April - 21 June 2024; Monday - Friday 18:00	
Iniya இனியா	Sun TV	4 October - 28 April 2024; Daily 21:30	29 April 2024 - 3 17 August 2024; Daily 22:00	
Mr. Manaivi மிஸ்டர். மனைவி	Sun TV	4 October - 28 April 2024; Daily 22:00	29 April 2024 – 17 August 2024; Daily 22:30	
Siragadikka Aasai சிறகடிக்க ஆசை	Star Vijay	23 January 2023 – 14 April 2023; Monday to Saturday 21:30	17 April 2023 - present Monday to Friday 21:00	
Mahanathi மகாநதி	Star Vijay	23 January 2023 – 23 August 2024; Monday to Friday 19:00	26 August 2024 - present Monday to Friday 22:00	
Aaha Kalyanam ஆஹா கல்யாணம்	Star Vijay	11 September 2023 – 23 August 2024; Monday to Friday 19:30	26 August 2024 - present Monday to Friday 19:00	
