= Vasantham Star =

- Genre: singing; Reality show
- Directed by: Heider Ali (S1); Malathi Madavan (S7)
- Presented by: Season 01; Elamaran; Season 02; Sara; Jaynesh Isuran; Season 03; Saravanan Ayyavo; Season 04; Jaynesh Isuran; Season 05; Varman; Bharathi; Season 06; Udaya Soundari; Varman; Season 07; Saravanan Ayyavo
- Judges: Season 01; Mohamed Raffee; Muralikrishnan; Soundra; Season 02; Kalaiselvan; Soundravalli; Mohan; Sondramogan; Season 03; Sangeetha; Sondramogan; Mohamed Raffee; Season 04; Sondramogan; Haider Ali; Malarvizhi; Season 05 & 06; Vicknesvari Vadivalagan; Yugendran; Erfan; Season 07; Shabir Sulthan; Vicknesvari Vadivalagan; Mohamed Raffee 'Vocal Trainer'; Erfanulla
- Country of origin: Singapore
- Original language: Tamil
- No. of episodes: Season 01: 13; Season 02: 13; Season 03: 10; Season 04: 10; Season 05: 13; Season 06: 13; Season 07: 13

Production
- Producers: Haider Ali (1); Anuratha Kanderaju (2); Malathi Madavan (S7); Pavithra Chandrakumar (S6)
- Camera setup: Multi-camera
- Running time: approx. 50–55 minutes per episode

Original release
- Network: Vasantham TV
- Release: 2005 – present

Vasantham Star is a 2005 Singaporean Tamil-language reality singing television show, which airs on Vasantham TV from 2005. Over eighteen years, Vasantham Star has produced seven seasons.

Vasantham Star is Vasantham's Indian Idol competition, a competition that guarantees instant stardom for the winner.

== Overview ==
Season	Episodes	Original Broadcast		Winner
Season	Episodes	First Aired	Last Aired	Winner
1	13	2005		Shabir Sulthan
2	13	2007		Ebbi
3	10	2009		Vikneshwaran
4	10	2011		Suthasini Rajenderan
5	13	2015		Subasini
6	13	2017		Nandhitha & Swathi
7	13	1 January 2023	26 March 2023	Navein Gunasekaran

== Season 1 (2005) ==
The first season aired on from 2005 and ended with 13 Episodes. The judges are Mohamed Raffee, Muralikrishnan and Soundra, Elamaran as the host. The winner of the season was Shabir Sulthan.

Prize Winners:

- Winner: Shabir Sulthan

== Season 2 (2007) ==
The second season was aired from 2007 and ended with 13 Episodes. Sara and Jaynesh Isuran as the hosts. Kalaiselvan, Soundravalli, Mohan and Sondramogan as the judges. The title winner of Season 2 is Ebbi.

Prize Winners:

- Winner: Ebbi

=== Top 4 Finalist ===
- Devarajan
- Dinesh
- Ebbi
- Viknesh

== Season 3 (2009) ==
The show launched on 2009 on Vasantham TV. Sangeetha, Sondramogan and Mohamed Raffee as the judges. The winner of the season was Vikneshvaran.

Prize Winners:

- Winner: Vikneshvaran
- First Runners-Up: Sivapalan

== Season 4 (2011) ==
It began broadcasting on 2011 and finished with 10 Episodes. Jaynesh Isuran as the host. Sondramogan, Haider Ali and Malarvizhi as the judges. The winner of the season was Suthasini Rajenderan.

Prize Winners:

- Winner: Suthasini Rajenderan

== Season 5 (2015) ==
Vasantham Star returned with its 5th season after four years. It began broadcasting on 2015 and finished with 13 Episodes. Varman and Bharathi as the hosts. Vicknesvari Vadivalagan, Yugendran and Erfan as the judges. The winner of the season was Subashini.

Prize Winners:

- Winner: Subashini
- First Runners-Up: Swaminathan

=== Top 3 Finalist ===
- Jayita
- Subashini
- Swaminathan

== Season 6 (2017) ==
Vasantham Star returned with its 6th season after two years. It began broadcasting on 2017 and finished with 13 Episodes. Varman has officially once again been appointed as the host with Udaya Soundari. Vicknesvari Vadivalagan, Yugendran and Erfan officially once again been appointed as the judges with Erfanulla.

4 judges, 3 duos, but who will be that 1 winning duo who will walk away with the title of being the first ever Vasantham Star 2017. Sheeta and Khirathanah was the winner of second season.

Prize Winners:

- Winner: Nandhitha & Swathi
- First Runners-Up: Sheeta & Khirathanah

=== Contestants ===
- Nishmen & Shobana
- Sheeta & Khirathanah
- Hari Kishan & Sharvesini
- Aravind & Sanjeev
- Nandhitha & Swathi
- Karthikeyan & Farzana
- Ansari & Habib
- Priydharshini & Soundarya
- Ramachandran & Preethi
- Karthegasu & Ibrahim

== Season 7 (2023) ==
The first season of the show began airing from 1 January 2023 and ended with 13 Episode from 26 March 2023. available for worldwide streaming on Mediacorp. It is the seventh season of 'Vasantham Star'. The three main judges of this show are Shabir Sulthan, Vicknesvari Vadivalagan and Mohamed Raffee, and Saravanan Ayyavo as the Host. Navein Gunasekaran was crowned the winner of Vasantham Star 2023.

=== Judges ===
Judges	Notes
Shabir Sulthan	Tamil Singaporean singer-songwriter, record producer, music compose. He is the winner of the inaugural singing competition Vasantham Star 2005.
Vicknesvari Vadivalagan	Actress and arts practitioner.
Mohamed Raffee	veteran musician.

=== Host ===
Judges	Notes
Saravanan Ayyavo	Television Actor and Host. winner of Pradhana Vizha Best Host.

=== Contestants ===
#	Contestants	Notes
1	Mazhaimega, (22)	Civil Engineering Student in Nanyang Technological University.
2	Sarva Srilal Tejasvini, (18)	Student and Modelling.
3	Aditya Anand, (23)	Student in Nanyang Technological University.
4	Vikneswaran Rajendran, (27)	Undergraduate student in PSB Academy.
5	Ashok Kumar Shwetha, (21)	Undergraduate student in Information Systems.
6	Mohamed Yacob, (27)	Financial Advisor.
7	Harsha Channa, (29)	Freelance Singer.
8	Navein Gunasekaran, (24)	Undergraduate student in Sociology and Public Policy.
9	Thivyashalini Ramkumar, (20)	Student
10	Shakshi Harendran, (26)	Freelance Singer and Actor
11	Prajeeth Venkatesh, (26)	Undergraduate student in Electrical and Electronic Engineering.
12	Sindhu Vimalkumar, (33)	Works in the Insurance Industry.

=== Episodes ===
Episodes	Airing	Team	Eliminate
1	1 January 2023	Blind Auditions	
2	8 January 2023	Introduction Round	
3	15 January 2023	Pongal special	
4	22 January 2023	A. R. Rahman Round	Sarva Srilal Tejasvini
5	29 January 2023	Kollywood Hero and Heroine special	
6	5 February 2023		Harsha Channa
7	12 February 2023		Aditya Anand
8	19 February 2023		Shakshi Harendran
9	26 February 2023		Sindhu Vimalkumar
10	5 March 2023		Vicky
11	12 March 2023		
12	19 March 2023	Wildcard Round	
13	26 March 2023	Grand Finals	

=== Finals ===
- Navein Gunasekaran: was announced the Winner of the Vasantham Star 2023 and received a cash prize of S$20,000.
- Mohamed Yacob: was the runner up of the season.
- Sindhu Vimalkumar: was announced third place by D. Imman.

==== Top 5 Finalist ====
Season 7 Contestants	Notes
Navein Gunasekaran	Winner
Mohamed Yacob	1st runner up
Sindhu Vimalkumar	2nd runner up
Prajeeth Venkatesh	Eliminated
Ashok Kumar Shwetha	Eliminated

=== Grand Finale ===
The grand finale telecast on Live on 26 March 2023. The chief guest for the grand finale was film composer and singer, D. Imman, who announced the name of the winner of the competition. The winner of this season was Naveen Gunasekaran, won 20,000 cash prize.
