= Tamil Pechu Engal Moochu =

- Genre: Speech; Reality show
- Presented by: Anitha Sampath; Erode Mahesh
- Judges: G. Gnanasambandam; Parveen Sultana
- Country of origin: India
- Original language: Tamil
- No. of seasons: 3
- No. of episodes: 19 (S3)

Production
- Production location: Tamil Nadu
- Camera setup: Multi-camera
- Running time: approx.42-50 minutes per episode

Original release
- Network: Star Vijay
- Release: 16 April 2008 – 15 August 2023

Tamil Pechu Engal Moochu (தமிழ் பேச்சு எங்க மூச்சு) is an Indian Tamil-language reality competition. The show is based on speaking Tamil letters, words, and sentences. The channel started taking auditions for this season through online audition registration. Then the offline auditions took place in Chennai, Madurai, Salem, Coimbatore, Trichy and Tirunelveli, and ended in 2022.

The show's first season aired on Star Vijay in 2008. The new season scheduled to premiere on every Sunday at 11:30 from 16 April 2023. The show was hosted by Anitha Sampath. The show's final episode aired 15 August 2023 and ended with 19 episodes.

== Final ==
The final episode was aired on 15 August 2023 in Indian Independence Day. The show special third guest was Suki Sivam with special guest was Suba Veerapandian, Pa. Vijay, Bava Chelladurai, Selventhiran and Salma.

The top 5 finalists were Arun, Ragavendran, Britto, Karthikraja and Naranayama Koventhan. Ragavendran, who was announced by G. Gnanasambandam and Parveen Sultana, was named the winner and received a Rs 3 lakhs cash prize award by Star Vijay. Britto was announced by Anitha Sampath as the first runner-up and was awarded a Rs 2 lakhs cash prize award by Star Vijay.

== Production ==
=== Release ===
The first and second promos were released on 28 March 2023, The first promo featured the honorable Tamil Nadu Chief Minister M. K. Stalin appeared in the promo. The third promo was released on 25 March 2023 by professor, Tamil scholar G. Gnanasambandam, Tamil writer Salma, political activist Suba Veerapandian.

The fourth promo was released on 26 March 2023 by lyricist, screenwriter Madhan Karky, Public speaker Nanjil Sampath and Parveen Sultana. The fifth promo was released on 25 March 2023 by Governor of Telangana Tamilisai Soundararajan. The sixth promo was released on 31 March 2023 by actor Kamal Haasan.
