= Start Music season 4 =

Start Music
- Season 4
- Hosted by: Priyanka Deshpande

Release
- Original network: Star Vijay
- Original release: 26 March – 12 November 2023

Season chronology
- ← Previous; Season 3 Next → Season 5

Start Music (season 4) is the fourth season of the Tamil-language Musical reality show Start Music, that launched on 26 March 2023 on Star Vijay and streams on Disney+ Hotstar on every Sunday at 20:00. Over four years, Start Music has rolled out three seasons and Priyanka Deshpande has officially once again been appointed as the host for the third time.

The show directed by Durgadhasan. The fourth season of the show was ended from 12 November 2023, with 32 Episodes.

== Episodes ==
Episodes	Airing	Serial	Team		References
1	26 March 2023	Baakiyalakshmi	Reshma Pasupuleti; Divya Ganesh; Vikash Sampath	K. S. Suchitra Shetty; Rithika Tamil Selvi; Meena Sellamuthu	
1	26 March 2023	Baakiyalakshmi	Winner: ₹ 50,000 (Reshma Pasupuleti; Divya Ganesh; Vikash Sampath)		
2	2 April 2023	Cooku with Comali 2 and Cooku with Comali 3	Rakshan; Pavithra Lakshmi; Pugazh	Santhosh Prathap; Shrutika Arjun; Mohamed Kuraishi	
2	2 April 2023	Cooku with Comali 2 and Cooku with Comali 3	Winner: ₹ 1,00,000 (Pugazh; Rakshan; Pavithra Lakshmi)		
3	9 April 2023	40+ Golden Years	Radha; Amudhavanan; TSK	Ambika; Diwakar; Azhar	
3	9 April 2023	40+ Golden Years	Winner Team: -		
4	16 April 2023	Soppana Sundari film Team	SG Charles; Balaji Subbu Vivek; Aishwarya Rajesh; Lakshmi Priyaa Chandramouli	Deepa Shankar; Thendral; Sunil Reddy	
4	16 April 2023	Soppana Sundari film Team	Winner Team: ₹ 60,000 (SG Charles, Balaji, Aishwarya Rajesh, Lakshmi Priyaa)		
5	23 April 2023	Eeramana Rojave 2	Dhiraviam Rajakumaran; Siddharth; Kiru Baji	Swathi Konde; Gabriella Charlton	
5	23 April 2023	Eeramana Rojave 2	Winner Team: ₹ 10,100 (Dhiraviam Rajakumaran, Siddharth, Kiru Baji)		
6	30 April 2023	Ajith Kumar Birthday Special	Jangiri Madhumitha; Mahanadi Shankar; Ramesh Khanna	Vidyullekha Raman; Robo Shankar	
6	30 April 2023	Ajith Kumar Birthday Special	Winner Team: ₹ 10,200 (Madhumitha, Mahanadi Shankar, Ramesh Khanna)		
7	7 May 2023	Romance Special	Vinoth Babu; Sabari; Salmanul Faris	Pvithra; Vaishnavi; Raveena Daha	
7	7 May 2023	Romance Special	Winner Team: ₹ 10,500 (Vinoth Babu, Sabari, Salmanul Faris)		
8	14 May 2023	Chellamma VS Kanne Kalaimaane	Anshitha Akbarsha; Arnaav Amjath; Shriya	Pavithra Aravind; Nanda Gopal; Rashmi Prabhakar	
8	14 May 2023	Chellamma VS Kanne Kalaimaane	Winner Team: ₹ 50,600 (Pavithra Aravind, Nanda Gopal, Rashmi Prabhakar)		
9	21 May 2023	Aaha Kalyanam Mahasangam	Vikram Shri; Vibish Aswanth; Anitha Venkat; Shilpa Mary Teresa	Akshaya Kandamuthan; Bhavya Shri; Ravishankar; Anjali Devi	
9	21 May 2023	Aaha Kalyanam Mahasangam	Winner Team: ₹ 10,100 ( Vikram Shri, Vibish Aswanth, Anitha Venkat, Shilpa Mary Teresa)		
10	28 May 2023	Siragadikka Aasai; Muthu VS Meena Family	Vetri Vasanth; Sri Deva; Salma Arun	Gomathi Priya; Diwakar; Sangeetha	
10	28 May 2023	Siragadikka Aasai; Muthu VS Meena Family	Winner Team:		
11	4 June 2023	Premgi Amaren VS Shiva	Premgi Amaren	Shiva	
11	4 June 2023	Premgi Amaren VS Shiva	Winner Team:		
12	11 June 2023	Bharathi Kannamma 2 Special	Vinusha Devi; VJ Annamalai	Farina Azad; Roopa Sree	
12	11 June 2023	Bharathi Kannamma 2 Special	Winner Team:		
13	18 June 2023	Thara Local	Aishwariyaa Bhaskaran; Sai Gayathri; Singapore Deepan	Vanitha Vijayakumar; Syamantha; Sarath	
13	18 June 2023	Thara Local	Winner Team:		
14	25 June 2023	BB Queens	Maheshwari Chanakyan; Queency Stanly; Shivin Ganesan	Dhanalakshmi; Nivaashiyni Krishnan; Janany Kunaseelan	
14	25 June 2023	BB Queens	Winner Team:		
15	2 July 2023	Mahanadhi; Maharaja VS Maharani	Kamurudin; Rudran Praveen; Ramesh; Sanjay Mohan	Lakshmi Priya; Prathiba; Aadhirai Soundararajan; Sujatha Sivakumar	
15	2 July 2023	Mahanadhi; Maharaja VS Maharani	Winner Team:		
16	9 July 2023	Husband`s VS Wife`s	Deepak Dinkar; Sidhu Sid; Yogeswaram	Sivaranjani; Shreya Anchan; Myna Nandhini	
16	9 July 2023	Husband`s VS Wife`s	Winner Team:		
17	16 July 2023	80`s Star	Nizhalgal Ravi; Suresh; Anand Babu	Kasthuri Shankar; Nalini; Nithya Ravindran	
17	16 July 2023	80`s Star	Winner Team:		
18	23 July 2023	Baba Black Sheep Team			
18	23 July 2023	Baba Black Sheep Team	Winner Team:		
19	30 July 2023	Mamiyar VS Marumagal	Meena vemuri Meera Krishna; Priya	Gabriella Charlton; Nakshatra Nagesh; Syamantha Kiran	
19	30 July 2023	Mamiyar VS Marumagal	Winner Team:		
20	6 August 2023	Kalaiyarkal VS Kanniyarkal	Saravana Vickram; Sameer; Aashish Chakravarthi	VJ Deepika; Ashwini Aanandita; Shobana	
20	6 August 2023	Kalaiyarkal VS Kanniyarkal	Winner Team:		
21	13 August 2023	Cooku with Comali 4	Andreanne Nouyrigat; Tiger Thangadurai; Monisha Blessy	Kishore Rajkumar; Sherin Shringar; Vichithra	
21	13 August 2023	Cooku with Comali 4	Winner Team:		
22	20 August 2023	Cinema`s Appa & Cinema`s Amma	G. Marimuthu; Mohan Raman; R. S. Shivaji	Meera Krishnan; Sathyapriya; Sulakshana	
22	20 August 2023	Cinema`s Appa & Cinema`s Amma	Winner Team:		
23	27 August 2023	Isai Potti	Binni Krishnakumar; Anuradha Sriram; Roshini		
23	27 August 2023	Isai Potti	Winner Team:		

== Release ==
The first promo was released on 10 March 2023 with the slogan "Start Music I am very happy". First episode was telecast on 26 March 2023 at 20:00 (IST), replacing Oo Solriya Oo Oohm Solriya Time slot.
