= Adithya TV =

- Country: India, Malaysia, Singapore
- Broadcast area: India, Singapore, Malaysia
- Network: Sun TV Network
- Headquarters: Chennai, Tamil Nadu, India

Programming
- Language: Tamil
- Picture format: 1080i (HDTV); 576i (SDTV)

Ownership
- Owner: SUN Group
- Sister channels: Sun TV Network (Channels)

History
- Launched: 8 February 2009; 17 years ago

Links
- Website: Adithya TV

Availability

Terrestrial
- (Malaysia) Astro: Channel 214 (HD)
- (Malaysia) NJOI: Channel 214 (HD)
- (Singapore) StarHub TV: Channel 158 (SD)

Streaming media
- (Malaysia) Astro: Astro Go

Adithya TV is a 24-hour Tamil comedy pay television channel from the Sun TV Network in India. It ranks fifth in BARC's top five channel list in Tamil.

== History ==
Upon creation, Adithya TV was the first Tamil-language channel devoted to comedy.

In 2014, Adithya TV came up with its very first comedy tour called Comedy Express. It was a comedy event that took place in four main cities of Tamil Nadu: Madurai, Tirunelveli, Dindigul and Trichy.

In 2015, Adithya channel made their own version of the song "Danga Maari" from Maari, following the Coimbatore version. They combined the song with comedians in the industry.

As of 2025, a panel from Adithya TV and Vijay TV judge the annual talent shows of conservancy workers.

== Programs ==
- Konjam Nadinga Boss
- Daddy Enakku Oru Doubt
- Sollunganne Sollunga
- Vaanga Sirikalam

=== Events ===
Title	Date Aired	Notes	Ref.
Comedy Express	27-28 December 2014	Segments of Konjam Nadinga Boss and Daddy Enakku Oru Doubt were performed live in four cities.	

=== Notable personalities ===
- Aadhavan
- VJ Archana (worked as a host for nearly 8 years)

== In popular culture ==
- In Naan Sirithal (2020), an advertisement from the channel was featured.

== See also ==
- Sirippoli TV
