= Vani Rani (TV series) =

Indian Tamil-language soap opera

- Genre: Soap opera Family
- Written by: P.A.Raghavan; S.Kumaresan
- Directed by: O.N Rathnam; V.C Ravi; A. Ramachanthiran; O.N. Rathnam; R. Aravindraj; CJ Baskar
- Creative director: Radhika Sarathkumar
- Starring: Radhika Sarathkumar; Venu Arvind; Babloo Prithiveeraj
- Music by: C. Sathya
- Opening theme: Shakthisree Gopalan; Kaushik Menon; Pa. Vijay; Dharshini
- Country of origin: India
- Original language: Tamil
- No. of episodes: 1743

Production
- Executive producers: Suku Kuchappan; Radhika Sarathkumar
- Cinematography: Meenatchippatti P. Kasinathan; S. Rajeeva Alwin; P. Chella Pandiyan
- Editors: K. Ganesh; K. Sathyabalan; B. James; B. Ramesh Lal; K. Bharath Kumar; M. Jayasimman
- Camera setup: Multi-camera
- Running time: 21 minutes per episode
- Production company: Radaan Mediaworks

Original release
- Network: Sun TV (2013-2018); Kalaignar TV (2021-2023); Murasu TV (2023)
- Release: 21 January 2013 – 8 December 2018

Vani Rani is an Indian Tamil-language soap opera that aired on Sun TV from 21 January 2013 to 8 December 2018 with 1,743 episodes. The show stars Radhika Sarathkumar, Venu Arvind, and Babloo Prithiveeraj.

This show was directed by multiple directors (O.N. Rathnam, V.C. Ravi, A. Ramachantiran, R. Aravindraj, and C.J. Baskar). This was Radaan Mediaworks' longest running serial and sixth longest running Tamil serial (as of May 2025).

The show started to re-telecast on Kalaignar TV from 19 July 2021 Monday to Saturday but it was shifted to Murasu TV from 4 September 2023. The show ended mid-way on Murasu TV due to broadcast right issues.

Radhika reprised the roles of Vani and Rani in Ponni C/O Rani.

== Plot ==
Twin-sisters, Vani and Rani are raised by their uncle, Rajamanickam, after their parents died. Rani sacrifices her education for Vani, who aspires to be a lawyer. Vani becomes a successful lawyer and marries Bhoominathan aka Bhoomi, a granite businessman. Rani marries Bhoomi's half-brother, Saaminathan aka Saami, a restaurant owner. Rajamanickam's son, Manohar falls in love with Bhoomi's sister, Jyothi. Rani is forced to get them married, earning Vani and Rani the wrath of their uncle and their mother-in-law Angayarkanni. Vani refuses to speak with Rani after that. As years pass, Vani and Bhoomi turn out to be successful and have two children, Suryanarayanan, Gauthamkrishnan, while Swami and Rani have three children, Saravanan, Selvi and Thenmozhi. They all share the same house. Angayarkanni enters to worsens the problems. Rani's elder daughter, Selvi falls in love and marries Rajesh with only Vani as a chance witness, resulting in Vani and Rani getting separated, with Bhoomi and Angayarkanni as the major cause. Eventually, he realizes his faults and tries to get the family together.

Vani and Rani's families get together but live in separate houses. Kadhiravan, a local don who has his vengeance against Rani's son Saravanan, creates problems. Vani's younger son, Gautham marries Kadhiravan's niece Pooja to rescue Saravanan. Kadhir realises his errors after Pooja's marriage. Jyothi's daughter, Poongodi is involved in a love triangle between her cousins, Karthik and Saravanan. In the end, she marries Karthik. Selvi also faces numerous problems amongst her family members – Kaali, Alamelu, Shenbagam, Shiva, Geetha, Aarumugam, Malathi

Vani's elder son, Surya marries Dimple, who dislikes Vani and Bhoomi. Rani faces her own problems with her house owner and his family members Muthupechi, Naagaraj and Velu. Later, Gautham becomes a policeman and investigates a murder than took place in a quarry which was owned by Guru Paadham (GP). GP is also a prominent business magnate and industrialist who controls the Indian medicine mafia activity and his son, Arya. GP puts a bomb in Pooja's car resulting in the death of Pooja's mother and aunt, Sudha and Pushpa, respectively. Gautham later kills Arya, enraging GP who vows for revenge. GP tries to kill Kadhiravan but is eventually arrested by Gautham. Poongodi and Karthik face their own problems with Azhagumayil and Parvatham. Saranvanan marries Pavithra.

The rivalry between Vani and Akhilandeshwari starts because of Surya's relationship with the latter's daughter, Janani during college days. They had a daughter, Riyah. Akhilandeshwari's brother, Sudhakar murderers Janani and frames Vani. Rani's younger daughter, Thenmozhi aka Thenu falls of a cliff and is presumed dead. Alive, but having memory loss, She lives as Bhavani with Chandrika and her brother, Poochi, who rescued her. Akhilandeshwari helps Chandrika and forces Thenu to smuggle drugs, but Rani and Vani save her. Eventually, Thenu regains her memory and reunites with her family.

Akhilandeshwari and Sudhakar begin a new plan with the help of Neela, Sanjay and Mukesh. Neela blackmails Saravanan and Sanjay through a plan and make money from them and Sanjay takes Bhoominathan's company with the help of Sudhakar and creates a confusion between Saaminathan and Bhoominathan.

Angayarkanni is murdered by Sanjay and Saami gets framed, occurring fights between him and Bhoomi. Sanjay plans to kill Saaminathan and Rani. Rani finds proof regarding Angayarkanni's murder and blackmails Sanjay, who is arrested. Bhoomi and Saami are reunited. Rani learns Akhilandeshwari's plan to kill Vani and risks her own life in danger. Vani too who faints learning Rani's situation. After some emotional affection between the sisters, their health improves. Akhilandeshwari finds out that Janani is murdered by Sudhakar and is arrested by Gautham, while apologizing for all her mistakes from Vani and Rani. Finally, both families are reunited after a lot of problems.

== Cast ==
=== Main ===
- Radhika Sarathkumar as:
  - Advocate Vani Bhoominathan
  - Rani Swaminathan
- Venu Arvind as Bhoominathan Vetrivelan Karuppusamy aka Bhoomi
- Babloo Prithiveeraj as Swaminathan Vetrivelan Karuppusamy aka Saami

=== Recurring Cast ===
- Arun Kumar Rajan as Advocate Suryanarayanan Bhoominathan (Surya)
- Neelima Rani as Priyanka Suryanarayanan alias Dimple
- Vignesh Kumar (Vicky Krish) as Inspector Gauthamkrishnan Bhoominathan (Gautham)
- Navya Swamy as Pooja Gauthamkrishnan
- Sujith Suprabha / Manas Chavali as Saravanan Swaminathan (Saravana)
- Shruti Shanmugapriya as Pavithra Saravanan
- Nikhila Suman / Niranjani Ashok as Selvi Swaminathan Rajesh
- Guhan Shanmugam as Rajesh Kaaliappan
- Neha Menon as Thenmozhi Swaminathan alias (Thenu)
- Rajkumar Manoharan as Karthikeyan alias Karthik
- Mahalakshmi Shankar as Poongodi Karthikeyan
- Sivaji Manohar as Manohar Rajamanickam alias (Mano)
- Gayathri Shastry/Jyothi Reddy/Roopa Sree/Premi Venkat as Jyothi Manohar
- Rajendran as Ponnambalam
- Srilekha Rajendran as Alamelu Ponnambalam
- "Saathappan" Nandakumar as Mayilvaganam
- Mohan in a dual role as
  - Karuppuswamy
  - Thangarasu
- Sudha Pushpa as Sudha Karuppuswamy
- Andrew Jesudoss as Kadhiravan
- Sasikala Shree as Pushpa Kadhiravan
- Joker Thulasi as Point
- Ramachandran Mahalingam as Sadasivam
- Dharini as Mythili Sadasivam
- Nagalakshmi as Parvatham
- Geetha Anjali as Azhagumayil Karthik
- Raaj Mithran as Balasubramaniam
- Veena Venkatesh as Meghala Balasubramaniam Rajamanickam
- Baboos Baburaj as Kaaliappan
- Sangeeta Balan as Sura Sundari Kaaliappan
- Meenakshi Muruha as Shanti Kaaliappan
- Murali Krishnan as Aarumugam
- Unknown / Jyothi Minnal Deepa as Malathi Aarumugam
- Ravikumar as Rajamanickam alias Manickam
- Shanthi Williams as Angayarkanni
- Mamilla Shailaja Priya as Akhilandeshwari
- Chandrashekharan as Sudhakar
- Bhanu Sri as Sandhya
- Priya as Janani
- Vasavi as Asha
- T Krishnan and Krishamurthy
- Radha as Vijayalakshmi Krishnamurthy
- Shamily Sukumar as Tejaswini (Teju)
- Nathan Shyam as Mithran
- Nalini as Krishnaveni
- Mamathi Chori in a dual role as
  - Kokila
  - Jessie
- Sumangali as Alamelu Thangarasu
- Sridevi Ashok as Shenbagam Thangarasu
- B.H.Tharun Kumar as GuruPaadham (GP)
- Vetrivelan as Chandrasekhar
- Fawaz Zayani as Arya GuruPaadham
- C.Ranganathan as Haneef
- Ravi Chandran as Naagaraj
- Deepa Shankar as Muthupechi Naagaraj
- Bharath as Velu Naagaraj
- Jayaraman Mohan as Shiva
- 'Vazhakku En' Muthuraman as Anbuchelvan
- Vimal Raj as Kaththi Shekhar
- Madhuvanti Arun as Chandrika
- Sai Swetha as Bhavani
- Krishna Kishore as Krishna
- Nakshatra Nagesh as Rudhra
- Meena Kumari as Yamuna
- Vasu Vikram as Moorthy
- Sri Vidhya Shankar as Devika's mother
- Reshma Pasupuleti as Devika Moorthy
- Nithya Ravindran as Savithri
- Nivetha as Valli
- Azhagu as Valli's father
- Krithika Laddu as Agalya Vishwanathan
- Nivedhita Pankaj as Anjali Vishwanathan
- Mohan Sharma as Vishwanathan
- Sathya Sai as Sivagami
- Suhasini as Nandini Dheenadayalan
- Prakash Rajan and Dheenadayalan
- Sivakumar as Mahalingam
- Kannayiram as Muthu
- Abhishekh as Mugundhan
- Kovai Desingu as Aasaan
- Aravish Kumar as Mani
- Anusha Rai as Tulasi
- Usha Elizabeth Suraj as Tulasi's mother
- Sathyajit as Kailash
- Thanu as Krish (Kanthiravan)
- Maanu as Ponnambalam
- Srimathi as Savithri

== Sequel ==
=== Ponni C/O Rani ===
A sequel series Ponni C/O Rani was broadcast from 27 June 2022 to 20 January 2024 on Kalaignar TV. The series narrates the story of Vani and Rani's friend, Ponni and the problems she faces in her family. The show stars Preethi Sanjiv, Manohar Krishnan in lead roles and Radhika Sarathkumar playing her dual role.

== Adaptations ==
Language	Title	Original release	Network(s)	Last aired	Notes	Ref.
Tamil	Vani Rani வாணிராணி	21 January 2013	Sun TV	8 December 2018	Original	
Hindi	Vaani Rani वाणी रानी	7 August 2017	&TV	2 March 2018	Remake	
Bengali	Seemarekha সীমারেখা	23 October 2017	Zee Bangla	12 January 2019	Remake	
