= Deivam Thantha Poove =

Indian television series

- Genre: Drama
- Written by: Dialogues; Mithra Azhaguvel
- Directed by: Prathap Mani
- Starring: Nishma Chengappa; Sreenithi; Amruth Kalam
- Theme music composer: J.V
- Country of origin: India
- Original language: Tamil
- No. of seasons: 2
- No. of episodes: 549

Production
- Producers: Anil Sundar; Gugan Manohar
- Cinematography: David Bhaskar
- Editor: Udhayachandran
- Camera setup: Multi-camera
- Running time: 22 minutes
- Production company: Rajammal Creations

Original release
- Network: Zee Tamil
- Release: 13 December 2021 – 26 August 2023

Deivam Thantha Poove (DTP) (transl. God presented flower) is a 2021-2023 Indian Tamil-language drama aired on Zee Tamil and streams on ZEE5. It premiered on 13 December 2021 along with Peranbu.

It initially stars Nishma Chengappa and Amruth Kalam in the lead roles. and the story is Mithra enters into a contract marriage with Vinay, who is diagnosed with cancer. After 6-year leap, it stars Sree Nidhi, (replacement of Nishma) and Amruth Kalam. Now the story focuses on the union of Mithra and Vinay. The series was ended on 26 August 2023 with 549 Episodes.

== Synopsis ==
=== Season 1 ===
Mithra from a poor background, comes out from the family for to settle the lend money of her father. But things takes turn, she faces lots of struggles to live in a new place, accidentally she met Dr. Ramakrishnan and seeks for help. Ramakrishna provides a shelter and job to Mithra. Ramakrishna's son Vinay, affected from Cancer and his father and mother Vasuki searches for Bride, as Vinay's lover and fiancée Thara rejects him because he has Cancer disease. So Mithra decide to marry Vinay has in the form of Contract marriage by getting money because her main motto is to settle the lend money. Later Mithra falls towards Vinay by his caring.

=== Season 2 ===
Due to Deepika's (Vinay's friend) evil plan, Vinay believed that Mithra was in affair and he can't accept be the father for Mithra's pregnancy. Mithra feels bad about Vinay and took the DNA test. Finally the result came positive and Vinay was shocked.

Vinay pleased Mithra, but Mithra leaves him as he was not believed her truly. After 6 years, Mithra blessed with boy baby Vikram and living in Gandhimati's house as a servant. Now Vinay and their family in search of Mithra. (End on 26 August 2023).

== Cast ==
Main

- Nishma Chengappa (2021–2022) as Mithra: Vikram's mother; Vinay's wife; she married Vinay for money as a contract marriage and she works in Ramakrishnan's hospital
- Amruth Kalam as Vinay: Mithra's husband; he is affected by Cancer and finally cured.

Supporting

- Sridhar Subramaniyam as Dr. Ramakrishnan: Vinay's father; Mithra's father-in-law; Vasuki's husband
- Harsha Nair as Vasuki: Vinay's mother; Mithra's mother-in-law; Ramakrishnan's wife
- Nancy as Deepa: Mithra's friend; she works as Nurse in Ramakrishnan's hospital
- Gayathri Priya as Uma: Mithra and Tharani's mom
- Murali Krish as Arun: Vasuki's younger brother; Vinay's uncle
- Poraali Dileepan as Ragu: Ramakrishnan's younger brother
- VJ Santhiya (2021–2022) / Minnal Deepa (2022) as Vasanthi: Ramakrishnan's younger sister-in-law (Antagonist)
- Uma Maheswari as Tharani: Mithra's younger sister
- Sandhya Ramachandran as Thara: Vinay's ex-fiancée
- Sailu Imran (2022) / Nithya Raj (2022) as Deepika: Vinay's friend (Antagonist)
- Jay Srinivas as Ashwin: he loved Mithra and works in Ramakrishnan's hospital

=== After 6 years leap ===
Main

- Sreenithi (2022–2023) as Mithra: She was away from Vinay and her family and staying in Karthik's house (Replacement of Nishma)
- Amruth Kalam as Vinay: Mithra's husband, who was in search of Mithra and his son Vikram

Supporting

- Shanthi Williams as Gandhimati: Karthik's mother
- Satvik Dev as Vikram: Vinay and Mithra's son
- Sridhar Subramaniyam as Dr. Ramakrishnan: Vinay's father; Mithra's father-in-law; Vasuki's husband
- Harsha Nair as Vasuki: Vinay's mother; Mithra's mother-in-law; Ramakrishnan's wife
- Murali Krish as Arun: Vasuki's younger brother; Vinay's uncle
- Ajai Bharat as Karthik: Gandhimati's son; Mithra's boss (Antagonist)
- Preetha Suresh as Thenmozhi: Gandhimati's granddaughter
- Aravind as
- Sonia as

== Awards and nominations ==
Year	Award	Category	Recipient	Role	Result
2023	Zee Tamil Kudumbam Viruthugal	Best Hero-Matinee	Amruth Kalam	Vinay	Won
2023	Zee Tamil Kudumbam Viruthugal	Best Serial-Matinee			Won
