= Kadhanayagi =

- Genre: Reality show
- Presented by: Kurashi; Kpy Bala (1-4); Priyanka Deshpande (5-18)
- Judges: Radhika Sarathkumar; K. S. Ravikumar
- Country of origin: India
- Original language: Tamil
- No. of seasons: 1
- No. of episodes: 19

Production
- Production location: Tamil Nadu
- Camera setup: Multi-camera
- Running time: approx.50–60 minutes per episode

Original release
- Network: Star Vijay
- Release: 29 July – 1 October 2023

Kathanayagi, also known as Kadhanayagi, is a 2023 Indian Tamil-language reality competition aired on Star Vijay and streams on Disney+ Hotstar where aspiring actresses compete with each other to act as the protagonist in a future Star Vijay serial.

The first season was aired on 29 July 2023 every Saturday and Sunday at 21:30 (IST). and airs every Saturday and Sunday. The show is hosted by Kpy Bala and Kurashi. K. S. Ravikumar and Radhika Sarathkumar as the judge.

The show final episode was aired on 1 October 2023, on Sunday at 15:00 (IST), and ended with 19 episodes. The season winner is Rubeena and Rubiseena.

== Series overview ==
| Season | Episodes | Original Broadcast | | Winner | Host |
| Season | Episodes | First Aired | Last Aired | Winner | Host |
|---|---|---|---|---|---|
| 1 | 19 | 29 July 2023 | 1 October 2023 | Rubeena & Rubiseena | Kurashi, Kpy Bala, Priyanka Deshpande |

== Final ==
The Final episode was aired on 1 October 2023, on Sunday at 15:00 (IST). The show special two guest was Actor Siddharth and MB developers trust forever Company manager director Sarath. The top 5 finalists were Akshaya, Pavithra Venkat, Rubeena & Rubiseena and Shalini.

Prize Winners:

- Rubeena & Rubiseena, who was announced by Radhika Sarathkumar, was awarded the 'Title Winner' of Kadhanayagi. So They arereceived a Rs 10 lakhs cash prize by MB developers trust forever Company and award by Star Vijay.
- Shalini was announced by Priyanka Deshpande, as the first runner-up of Kadhanayagi and was awarded a Rs 3 lakhs cash prize award by Star Vijay.

== Overview ==
=== Selection process ===
Stay Vijay organized auditions in various cities around Tamil Nadu in May 2023 where women were able to audition for a place in the show. During the show's filming, actresses who had passed this stage were then given acting classes in preparation.

== Contestants ==
| S. No. | Name | Home Town | Entry Episode | Episode Exited | Status |
|---|---|---|---|---|---|
| 1 | Rubeena & Rubiseena | Pollachi | Episode 1 | | |
| 2 | Sneha | Coimbatore | Episode 1 | Episode 6 | Walked Out |
| 3 | Sapna | Australia | Episode 1 | Episode 18 | |
| 4 | Pavithra Venkat | Chennai | Episode 1 | | |
| 5 | Kaaviya | Chennai | Episode 2 | Episode 18 | |
| 6 | Shalini | Coimbatore | Episode 2 | | |
| 7 | Akshaya | Madurai | Episode 2 | | |
| 8 | Janani | Chennai | Episode 2 | Episode 18 | |

== Golden crown ==
| Week | Akshaya | Pavithra Venkat | Sapna | Janani | Rubeena & Rubiseena | Sneha | Kaaviya | Shalini |
|---|---|---|---|---|---|---|---|---|
| 1 | ✓ | ✓ | | | ✓ | ✓ | | |
| 2 | | | | | | ✓ | | ✓ |
| 3 | | | | | | | | ✓ |
| 4 | | | | ✓ | ✓ | Walked Out | | ✓ |
| 5 | | | | | ✓ | Walked Out | | |
| 6 | | | | | ✓ | | | |
| 7 | | ✓ | ✓ | | ✓ | | | |
| 8 | ✓ | ✓ | ✓ | ✓ | ✓ | | | |
| 9 | 2nd Finalist | 4th Finalist | | | 1st Finalist | | | 3rd Finalist |
| 10 | | | | | Winner of this season | | | |

== Episodes ==
| Week | Episodes | Air Date(s) | Round Name |
|---|---|---|---|
| 1 | 1 | 29 July 2023 | Introduction Round |
| 1 | 2 | 30 July 2023 | Introduction Round |
| 2 | 3 | 5 August 2023 | Raja Rani Round |
| 2 | 4 | 6 August 2023 | Raja Rani Round |
| 3 | 5 | 12 August 2023 | Mamiyar Marumgal Round |
| 3 | 6 | 13 August 2023 | Mamiyar Marumgal Round |
| 4 | 7 | 19 August 2023 | Mahasangamam with Vijay Serial Heroine |
| 4 | 8 | 20 August 2023 | Mahasangamam with Vijay Serial Heroine |
| 5 | 9 | 26 August 2023 | Deiviga Suttru (The Divine Round) |
| 5 | 10 | 27 August 2023 | Deiviga Suttru (The Divine Round) |
| 6 | 11 | 2 September 2023 | Villain and Villi Suttru |
| 6 | 12 | 3 September 2023 | Villain and Villi Suttru |
| 7 | 13 | 9 September 2023 | Comedy Suttru |
| 7 | 14 | 10 September 2023 | Comedy Suttru |
| 8 | 15 | 16 September 2023 | Vellthirai Suttru |
| 8 | 16 | 17 September 2023 | Vellthirai Suttru |
| 9 | 17 | 23 September 2023 | Semi Finals |
| 9 | 18 | 24 September 2023 | Semi Finals |
| 10 | 19 | 30 September 2023 | Grand Finals |

== Off-Air ==
This show ended with 19 episodes from 30 September 2023, Because of Kamal Haasan's Bigg Boss 7.
