= Ponni C/O Rani =

Tamil language soap opera

- Genre: Soap opera Family
- Created by: Radaan Mediaworks; Radhika Sarathkumar
- Written by: S. Kumaresan
- Screenplay by: S. Kumaresan
- Directed by: N. Sundareshwaran (Episodes 1-133); S.S.Seravanan (Episodes 134-416); Rajan Maariyappan (Episodes 417-483)
- Creative director: Radhika Sarathkumar
- Starring: Preethi Sanjeev; Manohar Krishnan
- Country of origin: India
- Original language: Tamil
- No. of episodes: 483

Production
- Producer: Radhika Sarathkumar
- Cinematography: S. Sethupathi
- Editor: R. Pooja
- Camera setup: Multi-camera
- Running time: 22 minutes per epi
- Production company: Radaan Mediaworks

Original release
- Network: Kalaignar TV
- Release: 27 June 2022 – 20 January 2024

Ponni C/O Rani is a Tamil language family soap opera directed by Rajan Maariyappan (earlier by N. Sundareshwaran and S.S.Seravanan) and produced by Radaan Mediaworks with Radhika Sarathkumar as the Creative Director.

The show acts as a sequel to the 2013 series Vaani Rani, with the characters Vaani and Rani shown in extended cameo appearances. To show the continuity, S. Kumaresan was finalised as the screenplayer and storywriter. R.Sethupathi was the Lead Cinematographer while R.Pooja was the Editing Head.

The show began on 27 June 2022 and ended on 20 January 2024 on Kalaignar TV. It was telecasted every Monday to Saturday and it is also shown on Kalaignar TV's YouTube channel. Promos and sneak-peeks were also uploaded by the channel.

== Storyline ==
The story continues from the end of Vaani Rani. The plot is centered on Vaani and Rani's best friend Ponni's life. Ponni is a young woman married to Rajaram. They both were blessed with four children, Surya, Chandru, Aishwarya and Priya. Rajaram has an elder sister Visalam whose husband is Vinayagam. Pounu who was Ponni's close friend and her family (husband Naagapan and son Senthil) also stayed in Ponni's house until they shifted to their village.

Theme 1 (episode 1 to 174): In the past, a long time before Ponni and Rajaram's marriage, Rajaram was engaged with a woman Pushpavalli. Visalam and Vinayagam were arranging the marriage ceremony. However, on the marriage day, Pushpavalli deserted Rajaram and ran away from Chennai with her lover Anand to Mumbai. Rajaram went to extent of committing suicide, but he was stopped by Vinayagam. After a long time, he was finally married to Ponni. Thereafter, his life became prosperous, and he was leading a company named Ponni Mills. Twenty-five years after his marriage with Ponni, Pushpavalli shifts back to Chennai and gets to know about Rajaram's prosperity. She feels jealous. The storyline is based on how Pushpavalli tries to enter into Rajaram's life and breaks his family apart without Ponni getting to know about their past. This storyline also features the involvement of Vaani and Rani at certain instances.

Theme 2 (episode 1 to 174): Ponni's son Surya was dating a girl, Pavithra. However, he was not willing to tell the same to his parents. But, when Rajaram's rich friend Manickam came asking Surya's hand for his daughter Swetha, Surya's greed for money made him betray Pavithra and run after Swetha. Their marriage was arranged with several problems. On their marriage day, due to the involvement of Vaani and Rani, Surya changed his mind and wished to marry Pavithra. In the wish of having Swetha as his daughter in law, Rajaram decided to get his other son Chandru married to Swetha. This storyline is focused on how the secret of Surya-Pavithra's relationship gets out followed after how Chandru-Swetha manage to live with each other against their will.

Theme 3 (episode 175 to 229): After a long time, Pushpavalli, her husband (Anand) and daughter (Bhuvana) were killed in a car accident. Her other daughter Pooja was under the impression that Rajaram was the cause of the accident and vowed to go against Rajaram's family. Ponni, by her kind nature, allows Pooja to stay in her house, unaware of her wrong intentions. Rani, due to her sharp wit gets to know about Pooja's intentions and plays a key role in revealing Pooja's true identity.

Theme 4 (episode 213 to 436): A nemesis, Maya entered into Ponni's life. She was also running a Mill Company (Rajaram's rival company). She joined hands with Pooja and tried to bring down Ponni and Rajaram's company. After she lost the office-faceoff, it was revealed that Maya was Ponni's long-lost stepsister. In the past, Ponni's father Velusamy married another lady Devanae who gave birth to Malar. Malar was later renamed to Maya. This storyline was mainly centered on the clash between the two sisters where Ponni was not aware of her sisterly relationship with Maya. After getting to know the truth, the storyline also covers the consequences of this bond between the two rivals.

Theme 5 (episode 250 to 442): Surya's tea shop had an employee Chinnathambi who was in love with Ponni's daughter Aishwarya. She also began to share feelings for him. However, Rajaram detested Chinnathambi. Coincidentally, Chinnathambi's marriage was fixed with his cousin Malli by Malli's father Muthupandi against Chinnathambi's will. Later, Aishwarya and Chinnathambi with the help of Maya ran to a hill station and married secretly. After their marriage, to wreak havoc in Ponni's family, Maya engaged Malli to rebel against Chinnathambi leading to Chinnathambi and Aishwarya getting separated for a while due to a misunderstanding. With the help of Rani, the couple gains trust and reunites together.

Theme 6 (episode 273 to 478): Swetha could not give birth to a baby, which is why Bharathi was chosen as the surrogate mother. However, Bharathi started to have feelings for Chandru, leading to Swetha detesting her. Thereafter, Swetha became pregnant, but Bharathi continued to be in touch with Chandru and later on married him secretly as well. Chandru was seen showing a lot of care and love for Bharathi which made Swetha get a doubt whether Chandru loves Bharathi. This storyline is focused on the truth of Chandru's feelings and marriage secret to come out, facing the consequences.

Theme 7 (episode 401 to 436): One day, Maya met Rajaram's look-alike who went by the name Kaali. Looking at him, Maya hatched a plan to kidnap Rajaram and send Kaali in Rajaram's disguise so that he could wreak havoc in Ponni's house.

Theme 8 (episode 436 to 483): Maya turns over a new leaf and removes her hatred for Ponni's family. However, Kaali was greedy for money, hence, with the help of his girlfriend Ramaa, he made Maya and Rajaram unconscious and disguised himself as Rajaram to loot away all their money at once. To wreck more havoc, Kaali brings Chinnathambi's ex-fiancé Malli into the house to live with him, followed by him creating more problems leading to Chinnathambi forced to live with Malli again due to a misunderstanding created by Kaali. This storyline features Vaani, as to how she would solve the case and get the family happy again.

== Cast ==
=== Main ===
- Preethi Sanjeev as Ponni Rajaram (Rajaram's wife, Surya-Chandru-Aishwarya-Priya's mother)
- Manohar Krishnan in a dual role as:
  - Rajaram (Ponni's husband, Surya-Chandru-Aishwarya-Priya's father)
  - Kaali (Rajaram's look-alike, Ramaa's boyfriend)
- Radhika Sarathkumar in a dual role:
  - Vaani Bhoominathan (Ponni's best friend, Rani's twin-sister, advocate)
  - Rani Saaminathan (Ponni's best friend, Vaani's twin-sister, homemaker)

=== Others ===
- Sasilaya / Akila Krishnan as Maya Velusamy (Ponni's step-sister, Velusamy's daughter)
- Unknown / Usha Elizabeth Suraj as Visalam Vinayagam (Vinayagam's wife, Rajaram's sister)
- Arjun as Surya Rajaram (Pavithra's husband, Ponni-Rajaram's son)
- Dhanalakshmi Shiva as Pavithra Surya (Surya's wife, Anuradha's daughter)
- Shankaresh Kumar as Chandru Rajaram (has two wives Swetha and Bharathi, Ponni-Rajaram's son)
- Aruljothi Arockiaraj / Mounika as Swetha Chandru (Chandru's wife, Manickam-Padma's daughter)
- Nancy / Sherin Jaanu / VJ Lavanya as Aishwarya Chinnathambi (Chinnathambi's wife, Ponni-Rajaram's daughter)
- Prabhakaran as Chinnathambi (Aishwarya's husband, Malli's cousin and ex-fiancé)
- Hema Chinaraj as Priya Rajaram (Ponni-Rajaram's daughter)
- Vincent Roy as Velusamy (Ponni's father, Maya's step-father, Devanae's husband)
- Keerthi as Bharathi Chandru (Chandru's second wife)
- Pavithra as Ramaa (Kaali's girlfriend)
- Malar as Malli (Chinnathambi's cousin and ex-fiancé, Muthupandi's daughter, Shantha's granddaughter)
- Vijayalakshmi / S. N. Parvathy as Shantha (Chinnathambi and Malli's grandmother, Muthupandi's sister)
- Arvind Kathare / Birla Bose as Manickam (Swetha's father, Padma's husband)
- A Ravivarma as Vinayagam (Visalam's husband, Pushpavalli's rival)
- Karpagavalli as Pounu Naagapan (Naagapan's wife, Senthil's mother)
- Harish G as Senthil Naagapan (Pounu-Naagapan's son, Bhuvana's boyfriend)
- Raghavi Sasikumar as Pushpavalli Anand (Anand's wife, Evil minded, Rajaram's ex-fiancé)
- Vetrivelan as Anand (Pushpavalli's husband, Bhuvana-Pooja's father)
- Unknown / Shri Akila as Bhuvana Anand (Pushpavalli-Anand's daughter, Senthil's girlfriend)
- Dhachayani / VJ Thara as Pooja Anand (Pushpavalli-Anand's daughter, evil-minded)
- Bhargavi as Bhargavi (Maya's ex-assistant)

== Production ==
=== Development ===
After producing serials in Sun TV, Radaan Mediaworks decided to begin telecasting serials on other channels. Firstly, Kalaignar TV. The shooting of this serial commenced in March 2022.

=== Casting ===
- Preethi Sanjiv, Manohar Krishnan were cast to lead the ensemble cast of the show.
- A.Ravivarma, Arjun, Dhanalakshmi, Shankaresh, Nancy, Raghavi were cast as supporting actors.
- Raadhika was cast as Vaani and Rani from the 2013 Vaani Rani series to play an extended cameo-dual-role.
- Aruljothi Arockiaraj and Arvind Kathare were playing supporting roles but were replaced by VJ Mounika and Birla Bose respectively.
- Usha Elizabeth entered the show as a replacement for the role Visalam while VJ Thara replaced Dhachayani as Pooja.
- After Nancy quit the show, Sherin Jaanu replaced her. However, she also left resulting in VJ Lavanya to play the role.
- In March 2023, Sasilaya joined the cast, but in November 2023 she quit the series, and was replaced by Akila Krishnan.
- Later, Prabhakar and Vijayalakshmi entered the cast however Vijayalakshmi was replaced by S.N.Parvathy.
- In May 2023 Keerthi joined the show as Bharathi, followed by Malar joining as Malli in August 2023, both to spice up the drama.

== Prequel ==
=== Vaani Rani ===
A prequel series Vaani Rani is the base story of this serial. Vaani Rani focuses on the story of the two sisters, Vaani and Rani who are poles apart in nature and the way they face their problems in life. The show starred Radhika Sarathkumar, Venu Arvind, and Babloo Prithiveeraj in lead roles.
