= Polimer TV =

Indian Tamil-language television channel

- Country: India
- Headquarters: Chennai, Tamil Nadu, India

Programming
- Language: Tamil

Ownership
- Owner: Polimer TV Network
- Sister channels: Polimer News; Jothi TV

History
- Launched: 2007

Polimer TV (Tamil: பாலிமர் தொலைக்காட்சி, romanized: Pālimar Tolaikkāṭci; also known as Polimer) is an Indian Tamil language entertainment channel that was owned by Polimer TV Network. The channel shows dubbed series from other television channels and produced some original programming. It was initially launched as a local television channel by starting their headquarters at Salem and it aired only in Salem, Namakkal, Erode, Coimbatore, Madurai, and Dharmapuri. However, it was later converted into a Tamil entertainment channel by expanding the whole coverage in Tamil Nadu and moving their headquarters to Chennai.

== Former shows ==
=== Dubbed soap operas ===
- 24 Season 1
- Alaadin (150 episodes)
- Aval Oru Thodarkadhai
- Chanakya Sabadham (140 episodes)
- Devi
- Ennarguil Nee Irundhal
- En Kanmani
- En Kanmani 2 (270 episodes)
- En Vazhkai En Kaiyil (175 episodes)
- Engal Sai
- Inai Kodugal
- Ini Ellam Vasanthamey
- Iru Malargal (326 episodes)
- Kadhal Parisu
- Karthika Deepam
- Karnan – Suriyaputhiran
- Karuppu Vettai
- Kalyana Kanavugal (327 episodes)
- Madhubala – Konjam Ishtam Konjam Kastam
- Magalir Mattum (150 episodes)
- Mahaveer Hanuman
- Mouna Ragam
- Malgudi Days
- Maaya
- Mayakkam Enna
- Moondru Mudichu (2086 episodes)
- Nee Varuvai Ena
- Nenjam Pesuthey
- Nimirindhu Nil
- Ninaithale Inikkum
- Pavithra (150 Episodes)
- Priyamudan Naagini
- Pudhu Pudhu Arthangal
- Saaval
- Saami Potta Mudichu
- Sakthi Pola Yarumilla
- Shakti (274 episodes)
- Sree Rama Bhaktha Hanuman (52 episodes)
- Sundarakandam
- Thillu Mullu (225 episodes)
- Ullam Kollai Poguthada
- Ullam Kollai Poguthada 2 (99 episodes)
- Uravae Uyirae
- Vaa Arugil Vaa
- Vidhi
- Dharm Yoddha Garud

=== Reality/non-scripted programming ===
- India's Got Talent
