= Mediacorp Vasantham =

Vasantham
- Country: Singapore
- Broadcast area: Singapore; Malaysia (Johor); Indonesia (Riau Islands)
- Headquarters: Mediacorp Campus, 1 Stars Avenue, Singapore 138507

Programming
- Language: Tamil
- Picture format: 1080i 16:9 HDTV

Ownership
- Owner: Mediacorp
- Sister channels: Channel 5 Channel 8 Channel U Suria; CNA

History
- Launched: 1 September 1995; 31 years ago

Links
- Website: Vasantham

Availability

Terrestrial
- Digital terrestrial television: UHF CH 31 554MHz DVB-T2 Channel 5 (HD)

Streaming media
- meWATCH: Available on meWATCH website or mobile app (Singapore only)

Vasantham (Tamil: வசந்தம், lit. 'Spring') is a Tamil-language free-to-air terrestrial television channel in Singapore. Owned by state media conglomerate Mediacorp, the channel broadcasts entertainment and news programming targeting the Singaporean Tamil community.

== History ==
Since the inception of television broadcasting in Singapore, Tamil-language programming had been broadcast by Mediacorp and its predecessors via its existing channels; after having carried programming in all four of Singapore's official languages on Channel 5 and 8, the channels were split on 30 March 1973. Channel 5 would focus on English and Malay, and Channel 8 would focus on Chinese and Tamil.

On 1 September 1995, Channel 12—which took on Malay programming after Channel 5 relaunched as an English-language channel a year prior—relaunched as Prime 12, and Tamil programming moved to the channel. With the move, Tamil output increased from an average of 10 hours per-week to 16 hours.

In September 1999, Singapore Television Twelve announced changes to its two channels taking effect in 2000, with Prime 12 becoming a full-time Malay channel known as Suria, and Premiere 12 (which took on arts and cultural programming after the Prime 12 relaunch) becoming Central—a channel divided into blocks for children's programming, Tamil programming, and arts programming. "Vasantham Central" would be one of the three main program strands carried by Central.

In February 2008, it was announced that Central would be split into two full-time channels dedicated respectively to Tamil-language programming, and children's and arts programming. The new channels—Vasantham and Okto—would launch in 19 October 2008.

== Programming ==
Vasantham's programming consists primarily of Tamil-language dramas and variety shows. Seithi (செய்தி) serves as the station's evening newscast. In 2019, the channel launched Muthal Paarvai, a viewer-voted pilot contest for new Vasantham dramas.

Vasantham broadcasts from 9:00 a.m. SGT daily, signing off at 12:00 a.m. SGT on Mondays, Tuesdays, and Wednesdays, 12:30 a.m. on Thursdays, Fridays, and Sundays, and 1:30 a.m. on Saturdays (except on national holidays where it broadcasts for 24 hours). A simulcast of Mediacorp's Tamil-language radio station Oli 968 is carried during the overnight and morning hours until sign-on.
