= Tamil television drama =

Indian television genre

Tamil television drama or Tamil serials are a genre of Tamil-language television. The television series industry has played a pivotal role in increasing Tamil popularity in India, Sri Lanka, Singapore, Malaysia and Tamil diaspora. They are also broadcast in other parts of Asia, Africa, Europe, Australia and North America.

Tamil's first television weekly drama, Oru Manithanin Kathai, aired on DD1 on 1986 and consisted of 13 weeks. Anandham (2003–2009) was the first Tamil TV drama to cross 1,000 episodes and concluded with 1,297 episodes. Kolangal (2003–2009) was the first Tamil serial to cross 1,500 and Chandralekha (2014–2022) was the first Tamil serial to cross 2,000 and concluded with 2315 episodes.

Mayavi, It was the first Indian & Asian 3D series. Nadhaswaram, This serial on 5 March 2014 achieved the feat of being the first TV drama in Indian and Tamil television to be aired live. This was done to commemorate the show's 1000th Episode on 5 March 2014. By airing a 23-minutes 25seconds long live telecast in a single shot, the TV drama has earned a place in the Guinness World Records. Marmadesam, was an extremely successful tele-serial. It was ranked first in viewership among the television programmes telecast from Chennai in 1997. Chithi, It holds the credit of most watched regional Language television program in India ever.

== History ==
Tamil language series are chiefly produced in Chennai, following the liberalization of private television in India in the 1990s. The first Tamil languages TV show was Oliyum Oliyum. It was movie song compilation program on television popular during the 1980s.

Tamil's first television weekly drama, Oru Manithanin Kathai, itself based on Sivasankari's novel by the same name. It was aired on DD1 on 1986 and consisted of 13 weeks and starred Raghuvaran. The first mega serial, Shakthi was aired in Sun TV on 1995.

== Format ==
=== Tamil Nadu ===
Tamil television serials are usually helmed by one director, written by one screenwriter, thus having a distinct directing style and language, unlike American television series, where often several directors and writers work together. Series are likely to have only one season, with 1–500 or 1–1000 episodes. Mini series may be longer, with 100 to 200 episodes, but they also run for only one season.

The broadcast time for flagship dramas is 12 pm - 3 pm to 6 pm - 11 pm, with episodes on 5 to 6 consecutive nights : Monday–Friday or Monday–Saturday and weekends. Different dramas appear on each of the nationwide networks, Sun TV, Zee Tamil, Kalaignar TV, Colors Tamil, Zee Tamizh, Jaya TV, Raj TV, Polimer TV, Puthuyugam TV, Vendhar TV, Mega TV, Makkal TV, DD Podhigai, Dramas in prime slots are in the telenovella format, rarely running over 500 episodes.

Sun TV channel consistently remains the top rated Tamil channel and one of the top rated Indian television channel.

=== Singapore and Malaysia ===
The broadcast time for flagship dramas is 22:00 to 23:00, with episodes on Four consecutive nights: Mondays to Thursday, Friday, and weekends. Different dramas appear on each of the nationwide networks MediaCorp Vasantham, Astro Vaanavil, TV2 and Astro Vinmeen HD.

Most Malaysian and Singapore produce a variety of Drama series including Comedy Romance, Thriller, Mystery, Teen and fantasy. Series are likely to have one to three season, with 1–80 episodes. Mini series may be longer, with 1 to 16 episodes, they also run for one to three season.

Some popular contemporary dramas in Singapore include: Vettai, Nijangal, Vettai: Pledged to Hunt, Sundharam Kudumpathinar, Annamalai, Ragasiyam, Vetri, Must Date the Playboy. Must Date the Playboy, which was aired in 2026, became popular among People from India, Malaysia, Sri Lanka as well.

Some popular contemporary dramas in Malaysia include: Kalvanai Kandupidi, Manmadha Bullets, Avatharam, Zombie Kadhali, Pasanga series and Jeeyum Neeyum.

=== Sri Lanka ===
The broadcast time for flagship dramas is 19:00 to 21:00, with episodes on weekends nights. Different dramas appear on each of the nationwide networks Shakthi TV and Nethra TV. Sri Lankan Tamil channel Shakthi TV, Vasantham TV and Nethra TV channels aired syndicated television shows from Indian Tamil language, and has been well received.

The first serial produced in Jaffna was Marmakkulal. It was premiered on 2017 aired on IBC Tamil. This Show was produced by IBC Tamil and director by Apayan Ganesh. It was first Tamil languages series from Sri Lanka aired more than 100 Episodes.

Some popular contemporary Original dramas include: 7K, Chinnathirai, Gowthami.

== Contemporary series ==
Series set in contemporary times usually run for one season, for 100–1000 episodes of 22 minutes. They are often centered on a family story, with love ties and relationships being in the focus. Characters are mostly idealised, with Tamil female protagonists described as the ideal women, and can focus on ethics and social issues in rural areas. The daily dramas are also usually set in contemporary times, describing a family conflict or family relationships, centered on Tamil women, who sacrifice themselves for family happiness.

Some popular contemporary dramas include: Chiti, Anandham, Kalki, Kasalavu Nesam, Annamalai, Metti Oli, Kolangal, Thangam, Thirumathi Selvam, Deivamagal, Ethirneechal, Azhagi, Athipookal, Uyirmei, Sembaruthi, Yaaradi Nee Mohini, Mella Thiranthathu Kadhavu, Thendral, Kana Kaanum Kaalangal, Office, Madhurai, Marmadesam, Kadhalikka Neramillai, Nandini, Nayagi, Chinna Papa Periya Papa, Nadhaswaram, Sathya, Azhagiya Tamil Magal, Roja, Magarasi, Thalattu, Pandavar Illam, Abhiyum Naanum, Vanathai Pola, Kannana Kanne, Anbe Vaa, Thamizhum Saraswathiyum, Kaatrukkenna Veli, Thendral Vandhu Ennai Thodum, Pandian Stores, Amudhavum Annalakshmiyum, Sundari and Pudhu Pudhu Arthangal.

== Music ==
Theme music and background music sets the overall tone of the Tamil series. Most series will start off with one to three minutes of opening theme music during the opening credits. Other series will have at the very least a catchy melody in the beginning, displaying the drama's name that lasts a few seconds, and then one to two minutes of ending theme background music during the closing credits. Background music is placed and used at strategic points of the episode to set the mood of that particular show.

Original soundtracks (OSTs) are made specifically for each series and play an important role in Tamil dramas (mostly in Singapore and Malaysia). They are generally recorded by professional playback singers and tend to enhance the reputation and popularity of dramas. OSTs help to heighten a situation, accentuate a mood, provide relief, or serve as background to an interior monologue.

== Production ==
They are often mass-produced under large production banners, with companies like AVM Productions, Saregama, Radaan Mediaworks, Vikatan Televistas, Global Villagers, Venus Infotainment, Avni Telemedia, Balaji Telefilms, In House Productions, Kavithalayaa Productions, Vision Time India Private Ltd., Thiruselvam Theatres, Sathya Jyothi Films, running different language versions of the same serial on different television networks or channels.

== Crew ==
=== Actors and actresses ===
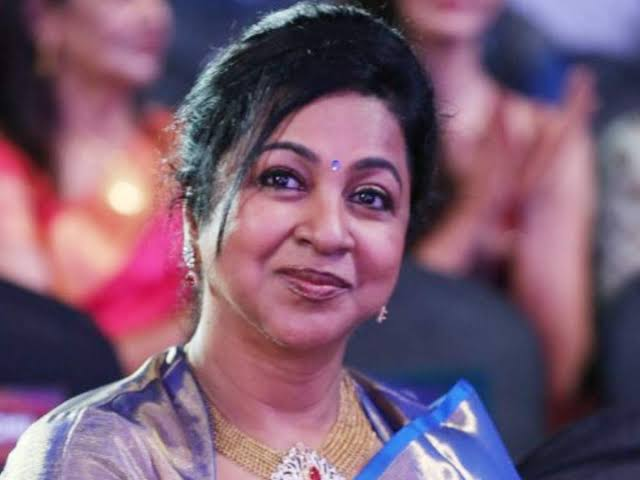
Radhika Sarathkumar is popular from the series Chithi, Annamalai, Selvi, Arasi, Chellamay and Vaani Rani.

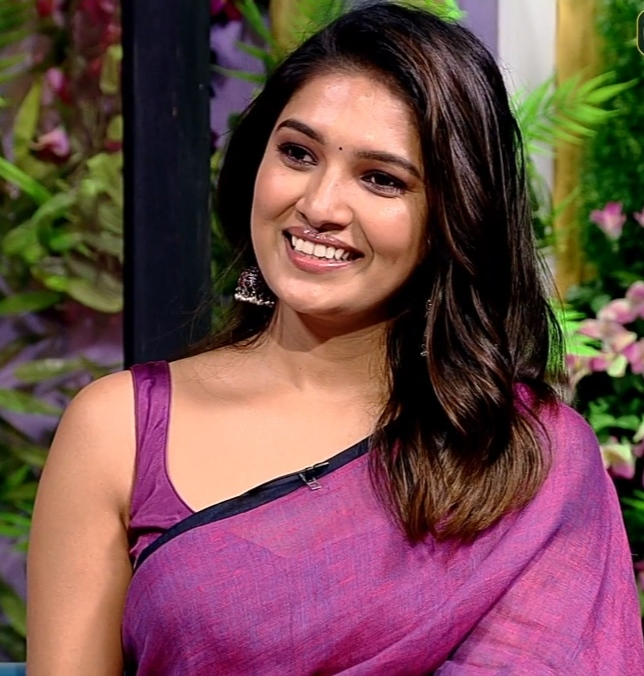
Vani Bhojan is popular from the series Deivamagal.

In the 2000s, it become customary to cast popular Kollywood Actors mostly Actress in series. Initially, this generated mixed reactions. It has been the normal in the Tamil television industry for actresses who initially played heroines in Kollywood films to get after married acting in Television serials such as Radhika Sarathkumar, Khushbu, Devayani, Ramya Krishnan, Meena, Mounika, Kutty Padmini, Gautami, Sukanya, Sri Priya, Kausalya, Ranjitha, Sanghavi, Archana, Nalini, Nirosha and Sonia Agarwal. Also, if an actress acts in a TV series, she has lost her name as a film actress (Big Screen) and some criticized her as a small screen actress. Also differences between small screen and big screen were seen in 2000s.

Nowadays, this has become a very common feature in Tamil dramas as the public does not differentiate between a film actress and a television actress. And some small screen actresses have also found success by playing heroines in films. Their critical reception is still mixed, however, some of them, like Devadarshini, Sivakarthikeyan, Nivetha Thomas, Santhanam, Vijay Sethupathi, Priya Bhavani Shankar and Vani Bhojan, became successful as Film actors and actresses.

There were also instances of children taking up careers as child actors or actresses. Actors who played child actors grow up to play lead roles or supporting roles in television series. such people include actress like Sujitha, Neelima Rani, Hemalatha, Raveena Daha, Gabriella Charlton and Sreethu Krishnan.

=== Directors and scriptwriters ===
Directors and scriptwriters of Tamil dramas are rarely as well known as actors are. An overwhelming majority of scriptwriters and directors are men. who mostly only write about women subject stories.

In the starting Time, Most of Television director coming from film industry. such people include directors like K. Balachander, who directed more than 20 series (Rayil Sneham, Jannal, Premi, Shanthi Nilayam, Anni); Balu Mahendra, the director of Kathai Neram; Sundar K. Vijayan, the director of Guhan, Kadavulukku Kobam Vandhadhu, Alaigal, Annamalai, Lakshmi, Muthaaram; Bharathiraja, the director of Thekkathi Ponnu, Appanum Aathalum and Muthal Mariyathai.

In the 2000s, many new male and female directors made their debut. Acknowledged TV directors include Thirumurugan, who directed and writer Metti Oli, Nadhaswaram, Kula Deivam and Kalyana Veedu; V. Thiruselvam who directed and writer Kolangal, Madhavi and Ethirneechal. Thirumurugan and V. Thiruselvam was also propelled to fame through his works Metti Oli and Kolangal & Ethirneechal, which became one of the highest rated dramas in Tamil Television history. Naga, the director of Marmadesam, Chidambara Rahasiyam and Ramany vs Ramany.

Some female directors have risen to prominence, such as Kutty Padmini, She directed, writer and product more than 50 series (Kittigadu, Naveena Nakeeran, Kalasam, Suryaputhri, Romapuri Pandian, Ramanujar and Thenpandi Singam); Rohini, who directed Chinna Chinna Aasai, and Sripriya who directed Viduthalai. The most well-known producers include Actress Radhika Sarathkumar and Khushbu.

== Streaming ==
Tamil streaming opened in the late-2010s. They are Hotstar (Later Disney+ Hotstar), Sun NXT, Voot, ZEE5, YuppTV, MX Player, SonyLIV, aha Tamil and ALTBalaji.

=== Hotstar (Disney+ Hotstar) ===
The first Tamil original Comedy drama for Hotstar, As I'm Suffering From Kadhal, aired on 16 June 2017. Triples became the second Tamil drama aired in the platform. Canadian remake, Vertige, of Tamil drama, Fall, ranked Top 5 in Indian.

Disney+ Hotstar is the also streaming platform to buy substantial amounts of Tamil television series. Kana Kaanum Kaalangal, November Story, Live Telecast, Mathagam, MY3, Label, Heart Beat, Uppu Puli Kaaram and Goli Soda Rising are among the Disney+ Hotstar productions that gathered success in Tamil as well as many other Indian languages.

=== SonyLIV ===
Iru Dhuruvam was first Tamil original drama for SonyLIV, first season released on 29 September 2019 with nine episodes. second season was released on 24 February 2023 with ten episodes. SonyLIV is one of the streaming platform to buy substantial amounts of Tamil television series and films. Victim, Tamil Rockerz, Vaazhl, Kasada Tabara, Naduvan, Appathava Aattaya Pottutanga, Yennanga Sir Unga Sattam, Sivaranjiniyum Innum Sila Pengalum, Pandrikku Nandri Solli, Clap, Seththumaan and Anel Meley PaniThuli are among the SonyLIV productions that gathered success in India.

=== ZEE5 ===
America Mappillai was first Tamil original drama for ZEE5, aired on 14 February 2018. Kallachirippu became the second Tamil category drama aired in the platform. The series was aired on 23 July 2018 and eventually ended up on 30 July 2018 with only 8 episodes.

In 2023 Ayali series was released on 26 January 2023, Bharathy Singaravel of The News Minute gave 4 stars out of 5 and wrote "Ayali, despite a few flaws, is receiving the praise it well deserves. It gives hope that the Tamil web series genre will choose nuanced storytelling over trying to stretch out cinematic mass moments for its actors."

=== Netflix ===
Since late 2020s American streaming service Netflix has been producing original Tamil-languages dramas and movies available on its platform. Netflix created its first original Tamil anthology drama series, Paava Kadhaigal, with the release date on 18 December 2020.

=== Amazon Prime ===
In 2018 American streaming service Amazon Prime has been producing original Tamil dramas and movies available on its platform. Vella Raja was first Tamil original drama for Amazon Prime and aired on 2 December 2018. Breathe became the second Tamil-Hindi drama aired in the platform.

Suzhal: The Vortex, The first Tamil web series has been released on Amazon Prime Video in over 30 languages through subtitles and has been dubbed in Telugu, Malayalam, Kannada, Hindi, English, French, German, Italian, Japanese, Polish, Castilian Spanish, Latin Spanish, Arabic, Portuguese and Turkish.

=== aha Tamil ===
In 2022 Akash Vaani, The first Tamil web series has been released on aha Tamil from 11 February 2022. Then Irai was released on 18 February 2022, Ramany vs Ramany 3.0 was released on 4 March 2022, Kuthukku Pathu was released on 13 May 2022 and Madurai Paiyanum Chennai Ponnum as released on 14 February 2025.

== Broadcast ==
Tamil TV dramas are popular overseas in countries such as India, Sri Lanka, Singapore and Malaysia. They are also broadcast in other parts of Asia, Africa, Europe and North America. The popularity of Tamil TV dramas in India markets is on the rise. Tamil serials are also dubbed in Malayalam, Telugu, Bengali, Kannada, Odia, Marathi and Hindi. And most serials air with English, Sinhalese and Malay subtitles.

=== India ===
==== Kerala ====
In the Indian state of Kerala, Tamil series are popular and broadcast at prime time including Kolangal, Aanandham,Vani Rani, Lakshmi Stores, Chandrakumari, Nandini, Maya, Jothi etc. were aired on Surya TV. Tamil Kadavul Murugan, Chellamma, Eeramana Rojave 2 and Muthazhagu were aired on Asianet in non-prime time.

Most Tamil series have been remade into on Surya TV, such as Parvathi in 2002 which was a remake of the serial Chithi, Minnukettu a remake of Metti Oli, Nilavilakku a remake of Thirumathi Selvam, Aniyathipraavu a remake of Vanathai Pola, Sita Ramam a remake of Sevvanthi and Bhavana a remake of Kayal, Kaliveedu a remake of Roja, Anandharagam a remake of Anandha Ragam, Athira a remake of Marumagal, Kanalpoovu a remake of Ethirneechal etc. Asianet also remade four Tamil TV series. Santhwanam and Santhwanam 2 are remakes of Pandian Stores and Pandian Stores 2 respectively, Kaathodu Kaathoram a remake of Eeramana Rojave and Chempaneer Poovu a remake of Siragadikka Aasai. Additionally Asianet adapted 3 Tamil reality shows. Start Music Aaradhyam Paadum, Cook With Comedy, Enkile Ennodu Para are adapted from Start Music, Cooku With Comali, Oo Solriya Oo Oohm Solriya respectively.

==== Andhra Pradesh and Telangana ====
In the Indian state of Andhra Pradesh and Telangana, Tamil series have gained popularity and the Tamil series, Chithi, Kolangal, Aanandham, Selvi, Arasi, Annamalai,Vasantham, Surya, Pasam, Chellamay, Kalyanam, Lakshmi, Vani Rani, Nandini, Priyamaana Thozhi and Maya were aired on Gemini TV, RVS TV, Zee Telugu and Vanitha TV.

Most Tamil series have also been remade into Telugu language versions such as Devatha which was a remake of the serial Thirumathi Selvam, Aparanji a remake of Thangam, Sravani Subramanyam a remake of Thendral, Jabilamma a remake of Deivamagal, Saadhana a remake of Kayal, Uppena a remake of Ethirneechal and Geethanjali a remake of Sevvanthi.

==== Karnataka ====
Tamil series have also been remade into Kannada versions such as Rangoli was a remake of the serial Kolangal, Chikamma a remake of Chithi, Bangara a remake of Thangam, Thangaali a remake of Thendral, Mangalya a remake of Metti Oli, Chandra Chakori a remake of Deivamagal, Janani a remake of Ethirneechal, Sangarsha a remake of Ayutha Ezhuthu and Sevanthi a remake of Roja. The Udaya TV and Star Suvarna channels air Tamil series remade in the Kannada language.

The first Tamil TV series broadcast on 2021 in Karnataka after long time was Ee Bandhana (dubbed version of Magarasi) on Udaya TV, Then Nannaseya Hoove (dubbed version of Poove Unakkaga) aired.

==== West Bengal ====
Tamil series Nandini, Maya, Arundhathi, Mishti O Ami, Laxmi Store, Bidhilipi and Onno Roope Nandini, were broadcast on Chennai-based Sun TV Network group started a Bengali GEC named as Sun Bangla on 2 February 2019. which also broadcasts in India and Bangladesh.

Pandian Stores was remade on 31 August 2020 on Star Jalsha, one of the leading Bengali-language television channels in India, under the name Bhaggolokkhi.

==== Maharashtra ====
Marathi-language

Tamil series have also been remade into Marathi. The Chennai-based Sun TV Network group started a Marathi GEC named as Sun Marathi in January 2021. It will be Sun group's fourth entry in South Indian market. shows like Nandini been dubbed in Marathi language to reach towards peoples of Maharashtra.

Tamil series have also been remade into Marathi versions such as Premas Rang Yave in 2023 which was a remake of the serial Anandha Ragam and Shabbas Sunbai a remake of Ethirneechal.

Hindi-language

Chithi drama was The first Tamil TV series was remade in Hindi language as Chhoti Maa...Ek Anokha Bandhan aired on Zee TV on 3 August 2001. Then Pavitra Rishta a remake of Thirumathi Selvam, Maayke Se Bandhi Dor a remake of Kolangal, Shubh Vivah a remake of Metti Oli, Pandya Store a remake of Pandian Stores, and Pyar Ka Pehla Naam: Radha Mohan a remake of Yaaradi Nee Mohini.

==== Bhojpuri language ====
Bandhan Toote Na, Bhojpuri language remake of Tamil drama, Yaaradi Nee Mohini, aired on Zee Ganga on 20 September 2021 to 18 November 2022.

=== Sri Lanka ===
In Sri Lanka Tamil channels air Tamil series, and also dub and subtitle in the Sinhalese language. The first Tamil Language serial to be dubbed in Sinhalese was Chithi. Tamil television series are extremely popular in Sri Lanka, with ratings higher than the traditional Tamil Nadu TV series that Sri Lankan Tamils watched. Most Tamil serial airs in Tamil language with Sinhalese subtitle.

=== Singapore and Malaysia ===
In Singapore and Malaysia Tamil Channel airs Tamil Series and subtitle in the English and Malay languages. Among the most popular series are Vettai, Nijangal, Ennuyire, Annamalai, Ragasiyam and Neeya.

=== Other countries ===
Tamil Series and television shows are also popular among the Tamil diaspora. Tamil television shows are aired on certain cable television channels in various countries such as the Malaysia, Singapore, Indonesia, the Philippines, Arab states of the Persian Gulf, South Africa, Réunion, Mauritius, Seychelles, Fiji, Guyana, Burma, Trinidad and Tobago, the French West Indies, Western Europe, Australia, Canada and the United States.

As The Iron Handed Phantom – Mayavi, the series aired dubbed in South Korea, China (in Mandarin) and Australia. It also aired in Europe. It was also dubbed in other Indian languages like Hindi, Marathi, Bengali, Malayalam, Telugu, Gujarati and Rajasthani for all the others Indian channels.

In 2007 Mayavi won the Special Prize Award in the Drama category at the Seoul International Drama Awards.

== List of longest-running Tamil language television series ==
This is a list of the longest-running Tamil Language television series, ordered by number of episodes the show has aired. This list includes only programs with thousand episodes and above.

Series shaded in light blue are currently in production.

Title	Cast	First broadcast	Last broadcast	Episodes	Channel
சந்திரலேகா Chandralekha	Shwetha Bandekar, Nagashree, Sandhya Jagarlamudi, Jai Dhanush, Arun Kumar Rajan, Munna, Ashwin Kumar	6 October 2014	8 October 2022	2315	Sun TV
வள்ளி Valli	Vidhya Mohan, Rani	17 December 2012	14 September 2019	1961	Sun TV
வாணி ராணி Vani Rani	Radhika Sarathkumar, Venu Arvind, Babloo Prithiveeraj, Neelima Rani	21 January 2013	8 December 2018	1743	Sun TV
கயல் Kayal	Chaitra Reddy, Sanjeev Karthik	21 October 2021	24 October 2026	1555	Sun TV
கோலங்கள் Kolangal	Devayani, Ajay Kapoor, V. Thiruselvam, Deepa Venkat	24 November 2003	4 December 2009	1533	Sun TV
கஸ்தூரி Kasthuri	Easwari Rao, Jayakrishnan, Kavitha	21 August 2006	31 August 2012	1532	Sun TV
பாக்கியலட்சுமி Baakiyalakshmi	K.S. Suchitra Shetty, Sathish Kumar, Reshma Pasupuleti	27 July 2020	8 August 2025	1469	Vijay TV
தெய்வமகள் Deivamagal	Vani Bhojan, Krishna, Rekha Krishnappa	25 March 2013	17 February 2018	1466	Sun TV
செம்பருத்தி Sembaruthi	Shabana Shajahan, Priya Raman	16 October 2017	31 July 2022	1432	Zee Tamil
நினைத்தாலே இனிக்கும் Ninaithale Inikkum	Swathi Sharma, Anand Selvan	23 August 2021	25 October 2025	1417	Zee Tamil
திருமதி செல்வம் Thirumathi Selvam	Sanjeev, Abitha, Rindhya, Latha Rao	5 November 2007	22 March 2013	1360	Sun TV
நாதஸ்வரம் Nadhaswaram	T. S. B. K. Mouli, M. Thirumurugan, Poovilangu Mohan, Srithika	19 April 2010	9 May 2015	1356	Sun TV
அவர்கள் Avargal	Vietnam Veedu Sundaram, Prem Sai, Vadivukkarasi	6 January 2003	2 November 2007	1351	Sun TV
தென்றல் Thendral	Shruthi Raj, Deepak Dinkar, Hemalatha	7 December 2009	17 January 2015	1340	Sun TV
வம்சம் Vamsam	Ramya Krishnan, Sai Kiran, Seema, Sandhya Jagarlamudi	10 June 2013	18 November 2017	1338	Sun TV
முந்தானை முடிச்சு Mundhanai Mudichu	Delhi Kumar, Durga, Rani, Sreeja Chandran	26 April 2010	4 April 2015	1325	Sun TV
பிரியமானவள் Priyamanaval	Praveena, Subhalekha Sudhakar	19 January 2015	11 May 2019	1315	Sun TV
ஆனந்தம் Anandham	Sukanya, Kamalesh, Brinda Das, Delhi Kumar	24 November 2003	27 February 2009	1297	Sun TV
அத்திப்பூக்கள் Athipookal	Devadarshini, Chetan, Sandhya Jagarlamudi, Rani	3 December 2007	14 December 2012	1272	Sun TV
இளவரசி Ilavarasi	Santhoshi, Shrikar, Rachitha Mahalakshmi	18 January 2010	1 November 2014	1263	Sun TV
யாரடி நீ மோகினி Yaaradi Nee Mohini	Shreekumar, Nachathira, Chaitra Reddy, Yamuna Chinnadurai, Fathima Babu	24 April 2017	22 August 2021	1253	Zee Tamil
பாண்டவர் இல்லம் Pandavar Illam	Delhi Kumar, Papri Ghosh, Aarthi Subash, Krithika Annamalai, Naresh Eswar, Guhan Shanmugham, Nesan Nepolean, Mohammed Absar, Surendhar Raaj, Anu Neela, Anisha Shetty, Rani, Kamalesh PK	15 July 2019	28 October 2023	1216	Sun TV
பொம்மலட்டம் Bommalattam	Sirija, Shreekumar, Delhi Kumar, Preethi Sanjeev	15 October 2012	22 October 2016	1150	Sun TV
பூவே பூச்சூடவா Poove Poochudava	Reshma Muralidharan, Karthick Vasu	24 April 2017	4 September 2021	1149	Zee Tamil
வானத்தைப் போல; Vaanathai Pola	Shreekumar, Maanya Anand	7 December 2020	17 August 2024	1134	Sun TV
சிறகடிக்க ஆசை Siragadikka Aasai	Gomathi Priya, Vetri Vasanth	23 January 2023	Present	1130+	Vijay TV
தாமரை Thamarai	Nirosha, Neelima Rani, Sai Latha	3 November 2014	4 August 2018	1130	Sun TV
வசந்தம் Vasantham	Chandra Lakshman, Shamitha Shreekumar, Delhi Ganesh, Shyam Ganesh, Lakshmiraj, Durga	3 September 2007	27 January 2012	1112	Sun TV
அன்பே வா Anbe Vaa	Delna Davis, Viraat, Shreegopika Neelanath	2 November 2020	28 April 2024	1102	Sun TV
மரகத வீணை Maragatha Veenai	Santhoshi, Muthukumar Samy, Sangeetha Sheedy	27 January 2012	28 September 2017	1102	Sun TV
அழகி Azhagi	Viji Chandrasekhar, Kamal Deep, Soniya, Nithya Ravindran	10 October 2011	4 March 2016	1101	Sun TV
ஆனந்த ராகம் Anandha Ragam	Anusha Hegde, Swetha Senthilkumar, Preethi Sanjeev	29 August 2022	14 January 2026	1043	Sun TV
மகராசி Magarasi	Srithika Saneesh, S.S.R Aaryann	21 October 2019	1 July 2023	1036	Sun TV
ஒரு ஊருல ஒரு ராஜகுமாரி Oru Oorla Oru Rajakumari	Ashwini, Puvi Arasu	23 April 2018	24 October 2021	1016	Zee Tamil
மகள் Magal	Meenakumari, Rishi, Kamalesh	8 October 2007	14 October 2011	1015	Sun TV
இரட்டை ரோஜா Rettai Roja	Chandini Tamilarasan, Akshay Kamal	12 August 2019	17 March 2023	1013	Zee Tamil
புது வசந்தம் Pudhu Vasantham	Soniya Suresh, Shyam Ji, Vaishnavi Nayak	26 June 2023	26 September 2026	1003	Sun TV

=== Season Episodes ===
This is a list of the longest-running Tamil Language television series, ordered by number of episodes the show has aired. This list includes only programs with thousand episodes and above. All seasons overall episodes countings.

Series shaded in light blue are currently in production.

Title	Cast	First broadcast	Last broadcast	Episodes	Channel
பாண்டியன் ஸ்டோர்ஸ் Pandian Stores (Season 1 and Season 2)	Stalin Muthu, Sujitha, Venkat Renganathan, Hema Rajkumar, Nirosha	1 October 2018	Present	2100+	Vijay TV
சரவணன் மீனாட்சி Saravanan Meenatchi (Season 1, Season 2 and Season 3)	Senthil Kumar, Sreeja, Rachitha Mahalakshmi, Kavin, Rio Raj	7 November 2011	17 August 2018	1901	Vijay TV
கல்யாணபரிசு Kalyana Parisu (Season 1 and Season 2)	Neha Gowda, Eshwar, Srithika, Arnav, Keerthi Jai Dhanush	10 February 2014	27 March 2020	1840	Sun TV
எதிர்நீச்சல் Ethirneechal (Season 1) எதிர்நீச்சல் தொடர்கிறது Ethirneechal Thodargirathu (Season 2)	Parvathy Venkitaramanan, Sabari Prasanth, Sirija, Priyadharshini, Haripriya Isai	7 February 2022	Present	1400+	Sun TV
மெளன ராகம் Mouna Raagam (Season 1 and Season 2)	Raveena Daha, Shilpa Nair, Krithika Khelge, Rajeev Parameshwar, Chippy Renjith	24 April 2017	17 March 2023	1380	Vijay TV
ரோஜா Roja (Season 1 and Season 2)	Priyanka Nalkari, Sibbu Suryan, Niyaz Khan	9 April 2018	21 March 2025	1371	Sun TV; Saregama
ஈரமான ரோஜாவே Eeramana Rojave (Season 1 and Season 2)	Pavithra Janani, Dhiraviam Rajkumaran, Swathi Konde, Sidharth Kumaram, Gabriella Charlton	9 July 2018	2 December 2023	1309	Vijay TV
சுந்தரி Sundari (Season 1 and Season 2)	Gabriella Sellus, Jishnu Menon, Krishna, Shreegopika Neelanath	22 February 2021	1 December 2024	1158	Sun TV
பாரதி கண்ணம்மா Bharathi Kannamma (Season 1 and Season 2)	Roshini Haripriyan, Arun Prasath, Farina Azad, Vinusha Devi, Sibbu Suryan	25 February 2019	6 August 2023	1139	Vijay TV
மாரி Maari (Season 1 and Season 2)	Ashika Padukone, Adarsh HS, Nakshatra Srinivas, Sugesh Rajendran, Baby Anjali	4 July 2022	1 November 2025	1068	Zee Tamil
சித்தி Chithi and சித்தி 2 Chithi 2	Radikaa Sarathkumar, Preethi Sharma, Nandan Loganathan, Dharshna Sripal Golecha	20 December 1999	28 May 2022	1047	Sun TV
கார்த்திகை தீபம் Karthigai Deepam (Season 1 and Season 2)	Arthika, Karthik Raj, Vaishnavi Sateesh	5 December 2022	Present	1038+	Zee Tamil

== See also ==
- List of Tamil soap operas
- List of Tamil-language television channels
- Lists of Tamil-language media in Malaysia
- Television in Sri Lanka
- List of Tamil-language films
