= Bala Ganapathi William =

Malaysian actor

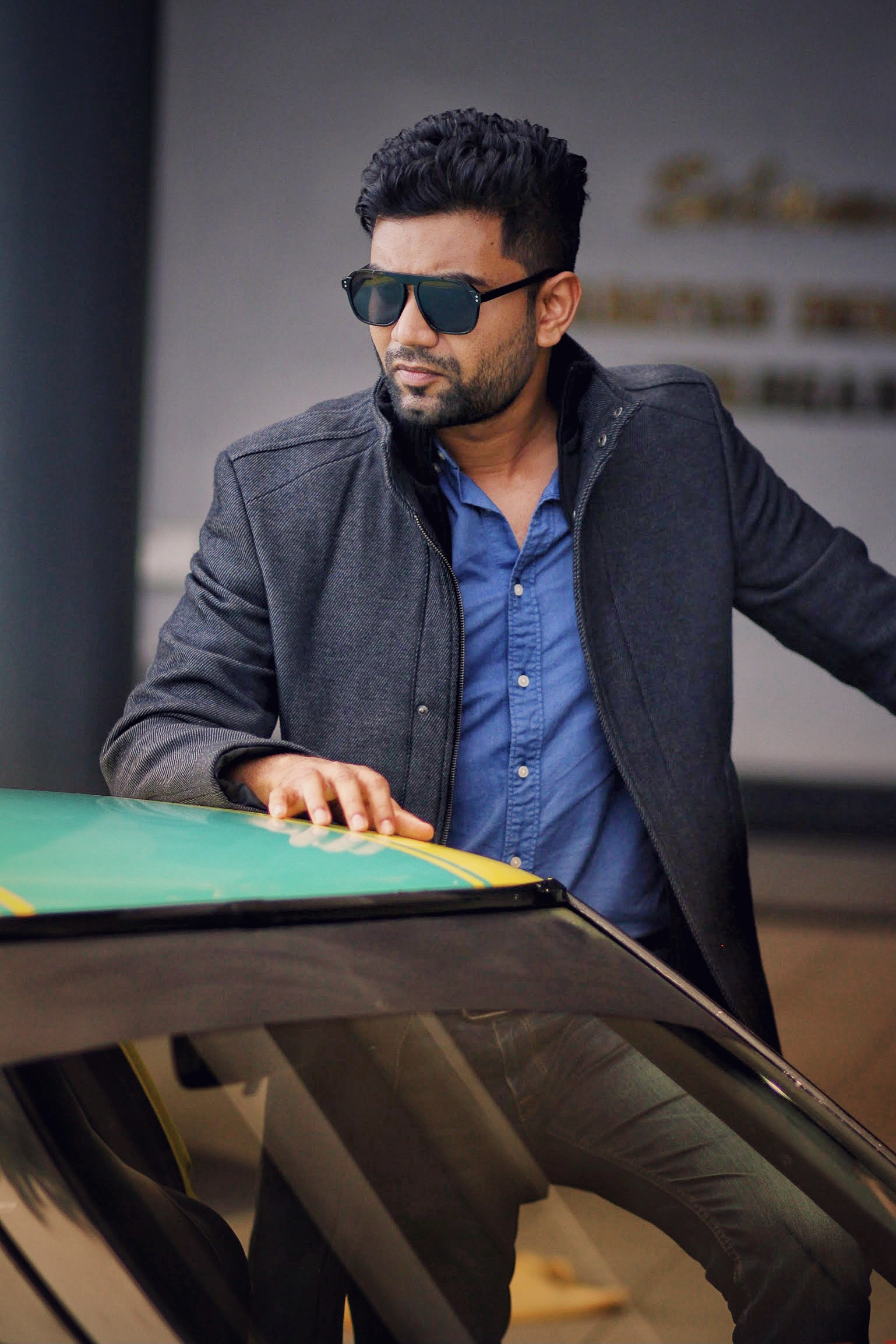
- Bala Ganapathi William at Undercover Rascals 2 film.
- Born: Sungai Petani, Kedah, Malaysia
- Other name: BGW
- Occupations: TV presenter, actor, director
- Years active: 2010–present
- Website: BGW – YouTube

Bala Ganapathi William, known professionally as BGW, is a Malaysian television host, actor, director, singer and producer. Bala Ganapathi William founded BGW Studios which specialises in advertising, Malaysian Tamil film production and distribution, music, and digital content.

== Early life and education ==
William was born in Sungai Petani, Kedah to Anglo-Indian William Boniface Netto and a Hindu mother. He did his primary education at SJK (T) Saraswathy and his secondary education at SMK Bandar Sungai Petani. He moved to Kuala Lumpur to attend university where he began attending auditions.

== Career ==
He first appeared on television in 2009 in a program titled Alaram 2 on ASTRO Vaanavil, at the age of 19. He made his debut as a host on a TV anchor in a dance competition titled Yuttha Medai in 2012. He made his acting debut in a TV drama titled Vazhkai Valvatharke which was aired on ASTRO Vaanavil in 2012.

In 2014, he started his production company BGW. The cooking show Rasikka Rusikka (2014-2019) gave William recognition as a host. BGW worked as an actor and assistant director on the Singapore Tamil TV series Annamalai (2014), which aired on Mediacorp Vasantham TV. He collaborated with Lawrence Soosai for the song "Kaadhal Enbathu Saabama". He made his directorial debut with Neeyum Naanum (2018).

== Awards ==
In April 2019, William received twin awards from MICA Awards 2019 as the Best Debut Director & Best Movie for Neeyum Naanum.

== Discography ==
Year	Film	Title	Notes	Ref.
2017	—N/a	"Kaadhal Enbathu Saabama"	Also music video director	
2018	—N/a	"Intha Kaadhale Venam"	Also music video director	
2018	Neeyum Naanum	"Tokkam Illaiye"	Also music video director	

== Filmography ==
=== Television ===
Year	Title	Role	Channel	Notes. and Ref.
2012	Yuttha Medai	Host	Astro Vaanavil	previously known as Aattam 100 Vagai
2012	Vazhkai Valvatharke		Astro Vaanavil	Supporting role
2012	Alaigal	Host	TV2	
2012	Unakkaga Ellam Unakkaga		Astro Vaanavil	Deepavali special; lead
2013	Kambatthu Pongal	Host	Astro Vaanavil	Pongal special
2013	Alarum Pookkal		TV2	Lead; also known as 3 Doctors
2013	Astro Vaanavil Super Star (Backstage with BALA)	Online Host	Astro Ulagam	
2013	Time Out	Participant	TV2	
2013	Marakkappattavargal		Astro Vaanavil	Lead
2014	Kalai Aranggam	Host	TV2	
2014	Yen Nanban, Yen Uyir		Astro Vaanavil	Lead; telemovie
2014	Velvi 2		TV2	Lead
2014	Yetho Mayakkam		Astro Vinmeen HD	Lead; telemovie
2014–2019	Rasikka Rusikka Seasons 1-5	Host	Astro Vinmeen HD	
2014–2017	Kaaval Seasons 1-2		TV2	Lead
2014–2015	Annamalai Seasons 1-2	Venu	MediaCorp Vasantham	Singapore Tamil Drama; also assistant and casting director
2015	Grahanam Season 1		TV2	Lead
2015	Gundhu Ponnae		TV2	Lead
2015–2016	Velicham Seasons 1-2	Host	TV2	
2016	Marma Camera		Astro Vaanavil	Lead; telemovie
2016	Manggalyam Tanthunanena	Gowtham	Astro Vaanavil	Lead; Telemovie produced by: BGW Studios
2019	Adavadi Deepavali		Astro Vinmeen HD	Also director
2020	Azhagin Azhaghi Beauty Pageant Season 1	Host	Astro Vinmeen HD	
2021	Athigaari	Inspector Kathirvelan	Astro First	Telefilm

=== Film ===
Year	Title	Director	Notes
2014	Goodbye	Bala Ganapathi William	Short film; also producer and cinematographer
2014	Vivaagarathu	Revathy Bawadass Kumar	
2016	Vinay	Ben G	Direct-to-video release
2018	Villavan: The Vigilante	Vassan	
2018	Neeyum Naanum	Bala Ganapathi William	Also producer

=== Music videos ===
Year	Title	Director	Singer	Music composer	Lyricist	Ref.
2012	Unakkulle Mirugam – Cover Video	BGW	K.G. Ranjith	Yuvan Shankar Raja	Na. Muthukumar	
2017	Kaadhal Embathu Saabama	BGW	Bala Ganapathi	Lawrence Soosai	Sheezay & Santesh	
2017	Yehnulle	BGW	Anjali	Sundrra	Maney Villanz	
2017	Nanba Vaa	BGW	Pillay Asbalan	Jose Franklin	Yuwaji	
2018	Pen Azha Vendam	BGW	Datin Sri Shaila Nair feat Magen Vikadakavi & Aneithazef	R.Lawrence	Jai Alamandra Quest	
2018	Intha Kaadhale Venam	BGW	Bala Ganapathi	Shane Extreme	BGW	
2018	Saaral Katru	BGW	Pillay Asbalan	Jose Franklin	Orchid Studios, Chennai	
2018	Ladybird	BGW	DK Dinesh Kumar	Princeten Charles, Germany	Psychomantra	
2018	Socks Bala	BGW	Santesh	Santesh	Santesh	
2018	Bells	BGW	Buggimaan	Killadi Music	Buggimaan	
2019	Darling Ille	BGW	Taiping Vicky	Santesh	Gana Deena	
2019	Niagara	BGW	Jigunnamaan	Killadi Music	Psychomantra	
