= Thenpandi Singam (TV series) =

- தென்பாண்டி சிங்கம்
- Genre: Historical drama
- Based on: Valukku veli ambalam
- Written by: Karunanidhi
- Directed by: Thanush
- Starring: Benito Alex; Devipriya; Nesan; Krish; Srikanth; V.K.R Ragunath
- Country of origin: India
- Original language: Tamil
- No. of seasons: 1
- No. of episodes: 151

Production
- Producer: Vaishnavi Media Works Limited
- Camera setup: Multi-camera
- Running time: approx. 20–22 minutes per episode
- Production company: Vaishnavi Media Works Limited

Original release
- Network: Kalaignar TV
- Release: 15 September 2016 – 13 April 2017

Thenpandi Singam (Tamil: தென்பாண்டி சிங்கம்) is a 2016 Tamil-language historical drama starring Benito Alex, Devipriya, Nesan, Krish and Srikanth. It aired Monday through Friday on Kalaignar TV from 15 September 2016 to 13 April 2017 at 8:30PM IST for 151 Episodes. The show has been created and written by author and screenwriter Karunanidhi. Thenpandi Singam is based on true story of the life of The Valukku Veli Ambalam.

== Cast ==
- Benito Alex
- Devipriya
- Nesan
- Krish
- Srikanth
- V.K.R Ragunath
- Sasindhar Pushpalingam
- Shaji
- Ashokraj
- Vijaypapirasanth
- Karna
- Shivaraj
- Ravi Krishna
- Dedid Ramesh
- Sumaraj
- Mouriya
- Ashok
- Heisan
- Monika
- Sri Priya
- Pathmini
- Shopana
- Santhy Ananth
- Babi
- Sobaraani
- Kiruthika
- Getha
- Bakyasri
- Rajkumar
- Viramani
- Vinoth
- V.M Rathnavel
- Krish Venkat

== Production ==
The series is written by Karunanidhi of the 2014 - 2016 hit historical dramas Romapuri Pandian and 2015 Ramanujar; and producer by Vaishnavi Media Works Limited of Kutty Padmini.

== International broadcast ==
The Series was released on 1 June 2015 on Kalaignar TV. The Show was also broadcast internationally on Channel's international distribution. It airs in Sri Lanka, Singapore, Malaysia, South East Asia, Middle East, Oceania, South Africa and Sub Saharan Africa on Kalaignar TV and also airs in United States, Canada, Europe on Kalaignar Ayngaran TV. The show's episodes were released on Kalaignar TV YouTube channel.

== See also ==
- List of programs broadcast by Kalaignar TV
