= Nithya Shree =

Actress

- Born: Kuala Lumpur
- Occupations: Model, Actress, Makeup artist and TV Host

R. Nithyashree is a Malaysian actress and makeup artist. She started her career as TV host for Astro Vaanavil's dance competition, Yuttha Medai All Stars. She made her acting debut in the film Vinay and Kambathe Kannemma. Before acting in the mainstream media, she appeared in a few music videos.

== Selected filmography ==
=== Television ===
Year	Show/Drama	Role	Channel	Note
2014	Yuttha Medai All Stars	Herself (Host)	Astro Vinmeen HD	
2014	Sakthi Global Super Star	Herself (Host)	Shakthi TV	
2016	Kalyanam: Terms and Condition Apply	Anjali	Mediacorp Vasantham	Singapore Drama
2017	Success	Herself (Host)	TV2	
2017	Kalyanam (season 2)	Anjali	Mediacorp Vasantham	Singapore Drama
2021	Tamillechumy (season 2)	Letchumitra	Veedu Production	Astro Vinmeem HD
2022	Singappeney Series	Sathya	ATV Pictures	Astro Vinmeem HD & Astro GO
2023	Pasanga Series (season 1)	Geetha	Veedu Production	Astro Vinmeem HD & Astro GO
2024	Pasanga Series (season 2)	Geetha	Veedu Production	Astro Vinmeem HD & Astro GO
2025	Pasanga Series (season 3)	Geetha	Veedu Production	Astro Vinmeem HD & Astro GO
2026	Pani Puri Travels	Koppuram Devi	Mediacorp Vasantham	Mediacorp Vasantham.

=== Movies ===
- 2014 - Vinay
- 2016 - Kambathu Kannama
- 2017 - Maama Machan 'ithu tamil padam'
- 2021 - Mr Peyii
