= Aadhira =

2025 Malaysian TV series

- Genre: Melodrama
- Based on: Syurga Itu Bukan Mudah
- Directed by: R. Azizan
- Starring: Rubini Sambanthan; Theebaan G; Saarra Selva; Kavitha Sinhya; Kaarthick Jay; Angayar Kanni; Priscilla Nair
- Opening theme: Unna Vida
- Country of origin: Malaysia
- Original language: Tamil
- No. of seasons: 1
- No. of episodes: 28

Production
- Producer: Elena Thomas
- Camera setup: Multi-camera
- Running time: approx.20-22 minutes per episode
- Production company: Keris Media Networks

Original release
- Network: Astro Vinmeen HD
- Release: 14 July – 28 August 2025

Related
- Syurga Itu Bukan Mudah

Aadhira is a 2025 Malaysian Tamil-language television series directed R. Azizan, starring Rubini Sambanthan, Theebaan G, Saarra Selva, Kavitha Sinhya, Kaarthick Jay, Angayar Kanni and Priscilla Nair in the lead roles. The show is an official remake of Astro Ria's Malay series Syurga Itu Bukan Mudah. The series highlights issues of domestic abuse, women's empowerment and the struggle to escape toxic situations.

It premiered on Astro Vinmeen HD on 14 July 2025 on Monday to Thursday at 21:00 (MST) and ended with 28 episodes on 28 August 2025, and is also available on the digital platform Astro GO and Sooka.

== Plot ==
The story follows Aadhira, a bold and resilient girl, who on the surface appears to be obedient and loving. However, her marriage to Dharmentra, a charismatic man, brings suffering in the form of physical, emotional, and financial hardship. Dharma's evil behavior turns their married life into “hell” and brings more obstacles and challenges to her after unraveling her husband's dark side, who is involved with a group called the "toxic masculine men".

== Cast ==
=== Main ===
- Rubini Sambanthan as Aadhira
- Theebaan G as Dharmentra

=== Recurring ===
- Saarra Selva as Sumitra
- Kavitha Sinhya as Pavitra
- Kaarthick Jay as Sidharth
- Angayar Kanni as Nirosha
- Priscilla Nair as Nimmi
- Kanimozhi as Janu Ma
- Rubini Sambanthan as Aadhira
- Vicky Rao as Manohar
- Sathishwararao Anantharao as Aiyar
- Vemanna Appannah as Varadhan
- Aahmuu Thirunyanam as Poornima
- Alvin Anthons as Chezhiyan
- Danushaasri Subramaniam as Gayatri
- Shanthi Anand as Mozhi
- Yeshwenddran Kunendran as Baby Rayyan

== Production ==
=== Development ===
The show was produced by Elena Thomas under Keris Media Networks. The series was director by Pooranachandhiran Kudumbathar fame R. Azizan, and the story-line is inspired by the Malay series Syurga Itu Bukan Mudah.

=== Casting ===
Miss International Malaysia 2014 winner Rubini Sambanthan plays the lead role in the series alongside Theebaan G, marking her major appearance in a local Tamil drama.

== Title Song ==
The show's title song was composed by Neroshen Thanaseharan, with lyrics by Oviya Oommapathy and singers by Yasmin JK, Deena Dakshini and Shan.
