= Badep =

Malaysian Comedy television series

- Genre: Comedy
- Written by: Elanmathi Elangovan
- Directed by: Joshua Micheal
- Starring: Joshua Micheal; Agalyah Maniam; Elanmathi Elangovan; Eswaran NK; Vanishaa Rameas; Loganathan; Premgi Amaren
- Opening theme: Badep Title Track
- Country of origin: Malaysia
- Original language: Tamil
- No. of seasons: 2
- No. of episodes: 19

Production
- Camera setup: Multi-camera
- Running time: approx.22-27 minutes per episode

Original release
- Network: Astro Vinmeen HD
- Release: 13 November 2023 – present

Badep is a Malaysian Tamil-language comedy television series that premiered on Astro Vinmeen HD on 13 November 2023. The series is written, directed, produced and acted by social media content creator, Joshua Michael. This series also acted by Premgi Amaren, Agalyah Maniam, Elanmathi Elangovan, Eswaran NK, Vanishaa Rameas and Loganathan.

The series premiered on the network's Vinmeen Exclusive line up replacing Akkam Pakkam. The series also available on the digital platform Astro GO and Sokka.

== Plot ==
Badep revolves around Joshua and his team trying to regain Babyma Bakery after losing it to a money lender. The crux of the story revolves around Joshua setting off to Chennai, India, to reclaim it from the money lender's daughter by kidnapping her and threatening her father.
