= Rubini Sambanthan =

Malaysian Indian model and actress

- Born: Jayarubini Sambanthan a/p Muthaliyar; 23 August 1991 (age 35); Kajang, Selangor, Malaysia
- Education: Malaysia
- Occupations: Model; Beauty pageant titleholder
- Height: 1.75 m (5 ft 9 in)
- Beauty pageant titleholder
- Title: Miss International Malaysia 2014
- Years active: 2013–present
- Hair colour: Black
- Eye colour: Black
- Major competitions: Miss World Malaysia 2013 (3rd Runner-up); Miss International Malaysia 2014 (Winner); Miss International 2014 (Unplaced)

Rubini Sambanthan is a Malaysian model, actress and beauty pageant titleholder who was crowned Miss International Malaysia 2014 and competed in Miss International 2014 held in Tokyo, Japan.

== Early life ==
Rubini was born in Kajang, Selangor. She is of Malaysian, Indian and Nepalese descent. She is fluent in English and Malay. She graduated in finance and accounting.

== Career ==
=== Pageantry ===
==== Miss World Malaysia 2013 ====
Rubini's first public appearance came to when she was chosen as one of the finalists to compete in Miss World Malaysia 2013.

==== Miss International Malaysia 2014 ====
She won Miss International Malaysia 2014, and represented Malaysia at Miss International 2014 held in Tokyo.

==== Miss Tourism Sri Lanka International 2016 ====
In 2016, Rubini was appointed to represent Malaysia at Miss Tourism Sri Lanka International 2016. She eventually placed as first runner-up and won a subsidiary title for Best National Costume.

=== Modeling ===
==== Asia's Next Top Model ====
She was scouted for the sixth cycle of the competition, becoming one of the 14 contestants. Rubini was placed in the top nine and was eliminated from the competition in the fourth episode.

==== After Asia's Next Top Model ====
In conjunction with Malaysia's Hari Merdeka celebration, Rubini was featured in Sephora "MY Face, My Pride" Merdeka campaign alongside Olympian Pandelela Rinong, graffiti artist Kenji Chai, and Ally Mukhriz who represents the working professionals while being a renowned presence in the social sphere. In 2019, she debuted her first acting gig as Laura in Devoted with actor Faizal Hussein.

== Filmography ==
=== Film ===
Year	Title	Role	Language	Notes
2022	Ada Hantu 2	Hana	Malay	Credited as Rubi Rubini.
2025	Neer Mel Neruppu	Peggy	Tamil	

=== Television ===
Year	Title	Role	Channel	Notes
2019	Devoted	Laura	Viu	Viu original series. Credited as Rubini.
2020	Ben & Bella	Jasmine	TV3	Miniseries presented by Nescafé Blend & Brew. Credited as Rubi.
2020	Biar Mereka Cemburu	Marsha Gordon	Astro & iQIYI	Credited as Rubi.
2022	One Cent Thief	Mimi	Astro	Astro original series. Credited as Rubi Rubini.
2025	Aadhira	Aadhira	Astro & Astro Vinmeen	Astro original series. Debut Tamil language drama

== Awards and nominations ==
Year	Award	Category	Nominated work	Result	Ref.
2020	Korea International Creator Festival (IMCF)	Best Social Media Star MY	—N/a	Won	
2019	Stail EH! Awards	Choice Model	—N/a	Nominated	
2016	Stail EH! Awards	Best Model	—N/a	Nominated	

Awards and achievements
Preceded by Charissa Chong Su Huey	Miss International Malaysia; 2014	Succeeded by Immaculate Lojuki
