= Kalyanam season 2 =

Kalyanam
- Season 2
- Starring: Karthikeyan; Nithya Shree; Jayaram; Vishnu M. Anandh; Shamini; Balakumaran
- No. of episodes: 45

Release
- Original network: MediaCorp Vasantham
- Original release: 3 July – 21 September 2017

Kalyanam (season 2) is a 2017 Singaporean Tamil-language family soap opera starring Karthikeyan, Nithya Shree, Jayaram, Vishnu M. Anandh, Shamini and Balakumaran. It replaced Ithu Namma Veedu and it broadcast on MediaCorp Vasantham on Monday through Thursday from 3 July 2017 to 21 September 2017 at 10:00PM (SST) for 45 Episodes. It a second season of Kalyanam.

== Synopsis ==
It is a story about is all about friendship, love and marriage. Radio DJ Anjali (Nithya Shree) encounters a different problem at work this time. Will this affect her marriage & how is her husband Arjun (Karthikeyan) going to help her?

== Cast ==
Main Cast

- Karthikeyan as Arjun
  - a Anjali Husband
- Nithya Shree as Anjali
  - a Arjun Wife, She working Radio DJ
- Jayaram
- Vishnu M. Anandh
- Shamini Gunasagar as Anjali's colleague
- Balakumaran
- Kalai Vani
- Varman Chandra Mohan

Additional cast

- Kokila as Anjali's mother
- Malene
- Suriavelan
- Harikrishnan
- Mahalakshmi
- Stephen
- Tasmaishree
- Jamuna Rani
- Manjula
- Karthik Logan
- Arockia Doss
- M. Karthigu

== Original soundtrack ==
=== Soundtrack ===
Tracklist
No.	Title	Singer(s)	Length
1.	""Kalyanam Azhaka Thali""	Pirasanna; Mukesh; Varshini	2:50

== Episodes ==
Episode	Title	Directed by	Written by	Date of Broadcast
1	"1: Kalyanam is back again"	Malipatel Sundhakar	Malipatel Sundhakar	3 July 2017
Satya is out of prison now. Is he still angry with Anjali and Arjun? Will he meet them? Will there be more issues yet again?
2	"2: New Friends"	Malipatel Sundhakar	Malipatel Sundhakar	4 July 2017
Anjali (Nithya Shree) made a new friend on-air. How would she help Ranjan solve the problems he is facing? Can Ranjan handle his heartbreak? Or would he take revenge on Rathi?
3	"3: Rumors"	Malipatel Sundhakar	Malipatel Sundhakar	5 July 2017
Rathi told Ranjan she is in love with Vinod? How is Ranjan going to react? Satya goes to meet Arjun. What is going to happen?
4	"4: My New Friends"	Malipatel Sundhakar	Malipatel Sundhakar	6 July 2017
Vinod confronts Rathi for telling Ranjan she is in love with him. What is Rathi going to tell Vinod? Anjali goes to the party Hema invited her to. She meets new people and makes new friends. How are these new friends going to be part of Anjali's life?
5	"5: New Job"	Malipatel Sundhakar	Malipatel Sundhakar	10 July 2017
Satya is starting his new job at Priya's office. Will he face any problems there? Anbu, Hema and Anjali are encouraging Keerthy to work. Will she take it on? What will her husband, Prakash, have to say about this?
6	"6: First month's pay"	Malipatel Sundhakar	Malipatel Sundhakar	11 July 2017
Satya gets his first month's pay. He goes to Arjun's house to show his gratitude. Will Anjali accept it? Prakash is starting to have doubts on Keerthy. What is he going to do?
7	"7: Proposal"	Malipatel Sundhakar	Malipatel Sundhakar	12 July 2017
Ranjan goes to meet Rathi. What will happen? Priya tells both Satya and Raj to prepare proposals for a pitch. Priya chooses Satya's proposal. How is Raj going to react?
8	"8: Meeting"	Malipatel Sundhakar	Malipatel Sundhakar	13 July 2017
Rathi tells Vinod about meeting Ranjan. What is Vinod going to tell Rathi? Hema meets a character in the office. What will happen between them? Anjali gets an annoying call on-air. Who is he and what does he want from Anjali?
9	"9: Distance"	Malipatel Sundhakar	Malipatel Sundhakar	17 July 2017
Raj complains about Satya to Priya. What will Priya do? Ravi Bernard still continues to tease Hema. Prakash goes to see Anbu. He tells Anbu to keep a distance with his wife. Will Anbu listen?
10	"10: Discusses"	Malipatel Sundhakar	Malipatel Sundhakar	18 July 2017
Anbu meets Anjali and tells her what Prakash said to him. Anjali is disgusted with Prakash. She then discusses about this with Arjun. Arjun warns Anjali to stay away from other people's problems.
11	"11: I am Waiting"	Malipatel Sundhakar	Malipatel Sundhakar	19 July 2017
Anjali is home with Arjun and the stalker calls her again. What is Arjun going to do?
12	"12: What will Say?"	Malipatel Sundhakar	Malipatel Sundhakar	20 July 2017
Will Arjun's confrontation with Prakash turn ugly? What will happen? Vinod goes to confront Ranjan. What will Ranjan say?
13	"13: Fight 01"	Malipatel Sundhakar	Malipatel Sundhakar	25 July 2017
Keerthy confronts Prakash about the fight with Arjun. Will Prakash confess? And Anjali tells Arjun that she's afraid of the phone stalker.
14	"14: Midnight Doorbell"	Malipatel Sundhakar	Malipatel Sundhakar	26 July 2017
Someone haunts Anjali and Arjun by ringing their doorbell at midnight. Anjali also receives unwanted gifts from the phone stalker. What are they going to do?
15	"15: What will happen"	Malipatel Sundhakar	Malipatel Sundhakar	27 July 2017
Will Raj be shocked at what Priya has to say? Would Ranjan have changed his mind about Rathi and Vinod? Prakash goes to Anbu's office again. What will happen this time round?
16	"16: Stalker"	Malipatel Sundhakar	Malipatel Sundhakar	28 July 2017
Anjali receives a box of photos from the phone stalker. What is she going to do about it? Priya tries to throw hints at Satya about her feelings towards him. Will Satya get it?
17	"17: Romantic trip"	Malipatel Sundhakar	Malipatel Sundhakar	31 July 2017
Join Anjali and Arjun as they go on a romantic trip to get away from all the stress! Priya is disappointed that they did not get the project. What was the reason?
18	"18: Breaking news"	Malipatel Sundhakar	Malipatel Sundhakar	1 August 2017
Ranjan calls Rathi. What is he going to tell her? Ravi gives Hema a bouquet and tells her a breaking news. What is it? Anjalis phone stalker calls her again; why is he persistently torturing Anjali?
19	"19: Anjali & Hema"	Malipatel Sundhakar	Malipatel Sundhakar	2 August 2017
What is going to happen when Anjali confides in Hema about the phone stalker? What is Hema going to do about it?
20	"20: Requests"	Malipatel Sundhakar	Malipatel Sundhakar	3 August 2017
Anjali questions Ravi about his actions; what is Ravi going to say? Arjun requests something from Anjali. Will she accommodate to Arjun's request?
21	"21: Relationship?"	Malipatel Sundhakar	Malipatel Sundhakar	7 August 2017
Satya informs Priya about his suspicion on why they did not get the project. What is Priya going to do? Keerthy has started working with Anbu. Will she face any issues at work or with Prakash? Rathi and Vinod are still trying to solve their differences. What is going to happen to their relationship?
22	"22: Stalker 2"	Malipatel Sundhakar	Malipatel Sundhakar	10 August 2017
Satya continues to find out why they did not get the project. Will he get closer to the answer? The phone stalker calls Anjali again. What does he want now?
23	"23: Revenge"	Malipatel Sundhakar	Malipatel Sundhakar	14 August 2017
Raj meets Mano to plan a revenge against Priya and Satya. What are they going to do? Arjun tries repeatedly to console Anjali about the phone stalker. Will Anjali listen to Arjun?
24	"24: Trying to say?"	Malipatel Sundhakar	Malipatel Sundhakar	15 August 2017
Will Satya ever get what Priya is trying to say? Ranjan goes to meet Vinod's mother. Will he tell her about Vinod and Rathi's relationship?
25	"25: Vinod Home"	Malipatel Sundhakar	Malipatel Sundhakar	16 August 2017
Vinod brings Rathi home. What is his mother going to say? The phone stalker scares Anjali even further...
26	"26: Planning"	Malipatel Sundhakar	Malipatel Sundhakar	17 August 2017
Satya tells Priya about Mano. Priya and Satya are planning something. Will they get to the bottom of this?
27	"27: Confused"	Malipatel Sundhakar	Malipatel Sundhakar	21 August 2017
Prakash's private investigator follows Keerthy and Anbu, will he find out anything? Vinod is still confused about Rathi, what is he going to do?
28	"28: Stalker 3"	Malipatel Sundhakar	Malipatel Sundhakar	22 August 2017
Anjali lures the phone stalker out but will he meet Anjali? Is Prakash going to create trouble at Keerthy's office again?
29	"29:"	Malipatel Sundhakar	Malipatel Sundhakar	23 August 2017
What is Priya going to do when she sees a mail from Mano's company? Arjun tries to find the phone stalker that is harassing Anjali, will he eventually get close to finding out his identity?
30	"30:"	Malipatel Sundhakar	Malipatel Sundhakar	24 August 2017
The phone stalker is getting close to Anjali's family. What will Anjali do now? Priya makes a harsh decision, what is it?
31	"31:"	Malipatel Sundhakar	Malipatel Sundhakar	28 August 2017
How is Keerthy going to react after finding the photos of her and Anbu in Prakash's car? On the other hand are Raj and Mano planning a revenge?
32	"32:"	Malipatel Sundhakar	Malipatel Sundhakar	29 August 2017
Vinod and Rathi get into an argument again. Anjali goes to meet the phone stalker while Arjun and Satya follow her to find out the identity of the stalker.
33	"33:"	Malipatel Sundhakar	Malipatel Sundhakar	30 August 2017
Why does Ranjan want to meet Rathi? Will Satya finally understand what Priya wants? Prakash continues to suspect Keerthy and Anbu.
34	"34:"	Malipatel Sundhakar	Malipatel Sundhakar	4 September 2017
Ravi Bernard surprises Hema with a gift. But she shocks him instead. What could it be?
35	"35:"	Malipatel Sundhakar	Malipatel Sundhakar	5 September 2017
Will Ranjan create problems when he goes to Vinod's house? Arjun goes home to find Anjali missing.
36	"36:"	Malipatel Sundhakar	Malipatel Sundhakar	6 September 2017
What is Vinod going to do when his mother is totally against him marrying Rathi? Priya is stuck in a dangerous situation, will Satya save her?
37	"37:"	Malipatel Sundhakar	Malipatel Sundhakar	7 September 2017
Hema tells Ravi Bernard how she feels. Will the phone stalker harm Swathi when he is following Anjali's family?
38	"38:"	Malipatel Sundhakar	Malipatel Sundhakar	11 September 2017
What does the phone stalker want from Anjali and her family? Will Satya, Arjun and Anjali's plan to trace and locate the phone stalker succeed?
39	"39:"	Malipatel Sundhakar	Malipatel Sundhakar	12 September 2017
Keerthy is giving Prakash the cold treatment. How will Ranjan console Rathi when she confides in him about the problems she is having with Vinod?
40	"40:"	Malipatel Sundhakar	Malipatel Sundhakar	13 September 2017
Raj and Mano meet again. Prakash panics when Keerthy does not come home.
41	"41:"	Malipatel Sundhakar	Malipatel Sundhakar	14 September 2017
Hema brings Ravi Bernard to meet her boyfriend. How will Ravi react? The phone stalker finally does what Anjali has been wanting.
42	"42:"	Malipatel Sundhakar	Malipatel Sundhakar	18 September 2017
Priya receives shocking news about Satya. Who is the new fan that Anjali meets?
43	"43:"	Malipatel Sundhakar	Malipatel Sundhakar	19 September 2017
Rathi meets Ranjan and tells him about her break-up with Vinod. How will Ranjan react? Anjali is still getting tortured by the phone stalker.
44	"44:"	Malipatel Sundhakar	Malipatel Sundhakar	20 September 2017
Anjali makes a decision to meet the phone stalker when Arjun is not around. Her mother warns her against it. Will she be safe?
45	"45: Final"	Malipatel Sundhakar	Malipatel Sundhakar	21 September 2017
Will Prakash stop suspecting Keerthy after meeting Anbu? The phone stalker tells Anjali his life story. What is Anjali going to do in the end?

== Broadcast ==
Series was released on 3 July 2017 on Mediacorp Vasantham. It aired in Malaysia on Mediacorp Vasantham, Its full length episodes and released its episodes on their app Toggle, a live TV feature was introduced on Toggle with English Subtitle.
