= Kalyanam (2016 TV series) =

- Genre: Soap opera
- Written by: V. Kalaiselvan; S.S. Vikneshwaran
- Screenplay by: V. Kalaiselvan; S.S. Vikneshwaran
- Directed by: I. Sundar V. Kalaiselvan
- Starring: Karthikeyan; Nithya Shree; Jaynesh; Eswari
- Theme music composer: Asva Mitra
- Opening theme: "Kalyanam Kalyanam Kalyanam"; Mukesh; Varshini Pakal (Vocal); Umadevi; Latithanand (Lyrics)
- Country of origin: Singapore
- Original language: Tamil
- No. of seasons: 1
- No. of episodes: 45

Production
- Producer: Lavin Selvan
- Editor: V. Kalaiselvan
- Camera setup: Multi-camera
- Running time: approx. 20–22 minutes per episode
- Production company: Another Megastar Production

Original release
- Network: MediaCorp Vasantham
- Release: 4 April – 23 June 2016

Kalyanam is a 2016 Singaporean soap opera starring Karthikeyan Somasundram, Nithya Shree, Jaynesh and Eswari Gunasagar. It was created by I.Sundar and is executively produced by Megastar Production's 'V.Kalaiselvan and Susiilaa Shanmugam. With Production Managed by Shasirekka Rountan and Lavin Selvan. It aired on Mediacorp Vasantham from 4 April 2016 to 23 June 2016, on Monday through Thursday at 10:00 pm SST for 45 episodes.

The drama follows the story of a bold girl, Anjali and her love-hate relationship with a wildlife photographer, Arjun. The theme of this soap opera centered on love and Singapore Indian marriage tradition.

== Plot ==
The story revolves around a crazy, outgoing and bold girl, Anjali and her unusual love-hate relationship with her boyfriend Arjun, a wildlife photographer. Their almost heavenly, sweet courtship days and their close-to-hell married chaos makes up the crux of the story.

== Cast ==
=== Main cast ===
- Karthikeyan Samasundram
- Nithya Shree as Anjali
- Jaynesh as Paarthi
- Eswari Gunasagar as Aarthi

=== Additional cast ===
- Devarajan
- Varadarajan as Vishwa
- Varman Chandramohan as Sathya
- Dhivyah Raveen as Nisha
- Jayaraman as Anjali's father
- Kokila as Anjali's mother
- Yuvina Malathi Ram as Vishwa's mother
- Lingam as Vishwa's father
- Jamesh Kumar as Anjali's boss
- Shamini Gunasager as Anjali's colleague
- Gowri Subramaniam
- Reuben
- Kathiraven
- Jenani
- Nagaraj
- Vimala
- T. Malee
- Sashirekka
- Preethivi Raj

== Episodes ==
=== Episode 01 ===
Favourite star couple Anjali and Vishwa's wedding was abruptly called off inches before they were pronounced man and wife. Anjali walked out of her own wedding rejecting the love of her life. Why? What did Vishwa do? What exactly happened?

=== Episode 02 ===
Anjali is pouring out her grievances about her wedding to her best friend, Paarthi. Anjali's boss is asking her to go on a short break. On the other hand, someone is secretly following Anjali. Who could it be?

=== Episode 03 ===
Anjali's reputation and career is at stake. The public, family and friends are all talking about her wedding incident. How will Anjali react to this?

=== Episode 04 ===
Anjali decides to go on a short getaway. Where is she off to?

=== Episode 05 ===
Anjali goes to Kota Kinabalu and meets Arjun and befriends him. Where will their friendship take them?

== Original soundtrack ==
=== Soundtrack ===
Tracklist
No.	Title	Lyrics	Singer(s)	Length
1.	"Kalyanam Kalyanam Kalyanam..."	Umadevi; Latithanand	Mukesh; Varshini Pakal	2:00

== Broadcast ==
Series was released on 4 April 2016 on Mediacorp Vasantham. It aired in Malaysia on Mediacorp Vasantham, Its full length episodes and released its episodes on their app Toggle, a live TV feature was introduced on Toggle with English Subtitle.

== Sequel ==
The season 2 of this drama started on 3 July 2017

- Kalyanam (season 2)
