= Jeeyum Neeyum =

- Genre: Romantic fantasy
- Directed by: S. Balachandran
- Starring: Jee Kutty; Shabby; Kavitha Shinya; Lishalliny Kanaran; Magen Vikadakavi
- Theme music composer: Gs Tharmann
- Opening theme: Jee Boom Baa
- Country of origin: Malaysia
- Original language: Tamil
- No. of seasons: 1
- No. of episodes: 16

Production
- Camera setup: Multi-camera
- Running time: approx.22-27 minutes per episode

Original release
- Network: Astro Vinmeen HD
- Release: 3 July 2023 – present

Jeeyum Neeyum (transl. Jee and me) is a Malaysian Tamil-language romantic fantasy television series directed by S. Balachandran. The series acted by ensemble cast. It premiered on Astro Vinmeen HD on 3 July 2023 on Monday to Thursday at 21:00 (MST).

The series primere on the network's Vinmeen Exclusive line up replacing 'Pasanga Series'. The series also available on the digital platform Astro GO or stream anytime on demand.

== Plot ==
The story centers around Jee(Jee Kutty), a young and ambitious actor with dwarfism, who harbors dreams of becoming a lead actor alongside the famous Meera Shetty(Lishalliny Kanaran), his idol. In this captivating tale, Jee's life takes a magical turn when he discovers the mysterious ring inside a hidden cave.

The moment the ring slides onto his finger, a brilliant flash of light engulfs him, and he finds himself standing face-to-face with the spirited genie, Neena(Kavitha Shinya). Amused by Jee's unexpected presence, Neena introduces herself and reveals the magical ring's purpose – to grant its wearer a single wish.

With stars in his eyes and dreams in his heart, Jee sees this as an opportunity to change his life and fulfill his aspirations. After a moment of contemplation, he confidently expresses his wish to transform himself into a leading actor, envisioning a future where he shares the screen with his idol, Meera Shetty.

As his wish is granted, Jee undergoes a breathtaking transformation, becoming taller, more dashing, and gifted with irresistible charisma. Overwhelmed by his newfound appearance and talent, Jee embarks on a journey to achieve his dreams in the world of entertainment.

However, little does Jee know that the ancient cave and its magical artifacts hold a hidden history. The spirit of the ring's original owner, a powerful sorcerer, has long been trapped within the ring, yearning for freedom and revenge against those who confined him.

When Professor Seena (Magen Vikadakavi) inadvertently stumbles upon the cave and touches the ring, the sorcerer's spirit possesses him, leaving the professor with a dual identity and a determined mission to retrieve the ring and reclaim his long-lost powers.

As the story unfolds, Jee must navigate the challenges of fame and success while protecting the magic ring from the clutches of evil forces. Neena becomes both his guide and confidante, warning him of the dangers lurking around every corner.

With Dharuka relentlessly pursuing Neena and the power she possesses, Jee finds himself embroiled in a gripping battle between good and evil. As the stakes rise, he learns valuable lessons about courage, friendship, and the importance of using his newfound abilities for the greater good.

== Cast ==
- Jee Kutty as Jee
- Shabby as Jeeva
- Kavitha Shinya as Neena, the genie
- Lishalliny Kanaran as Meera Shetty
- Magen Vikadakavi as Professor Seena
- Rupini Krishnan as AD Gayathree
- Snazzy as Kamal, Jee's best friend
- Vicky Perumal as Director James Kumaran
- Jega as Theeru Prof.Seena’s Assistant
- Haaranei Muthu Kumar as Samantha
- Mohana Raj as The King
- Ah Tong as King's priest (Sithan)
- Agho as Sam, Jee's boss
- K. Prakash as Veejay, Jee's Brother in law
- Dhinashini as Ramya, Kamal’s girlfriend

== Original soundtrack ==
No.	Title	Lyrics	Music	Artist	Length
1.	"Jee Boom Baa "	Seeran Selvaraju	Gs Tharmann	Arvind Raj & Axis	3:15
