= Fire on Water =

2024 Malaysian Tamil-language romantic drama film directed by Sun-J Perumal

- Directed by: Sun-J Perumal
- Written by: Sun-J Perumal; Sivanantham Perianan
- Starring: Karnan Kanapathy; Rubini Sambanthan; Rupini Krishnan; Tinesh Sarathi Krishnan
- Cinematography: Gwai Lou
- Production companies: Skyzen Studios; Astro Shaw
- Release dates: January 2024 (IFFR); 4 December 2025 (Malaysia)
- Running time: 120 minutes
- Country: Malaysia
- Language: Tamil

Fire on Water (Tamil: Neer Mel Neruppu) is a 2024 Malaysian Tamil-language romantic drama directed by Sun-J Perumal and written by Sivanantham Perianan. The film stars Karnan Kanapathy as Karthi and Rubini Sambanthan in the pivotal roles. In January 2024, the film had its world premiere in the Harbour section of the International Film Festival Rotterdam. The film was also premiered at Osaka Asian Film Festival in March 2024. The film opened to positive reviews from critics, especially praising the screenplay, direction of the film, cinematography and the performance of the protagonist.

The film was released under the title Blues in Malaysia on 4 December 2025.

== Synopsis ==
Karthi, an assistant director who is predominantly working on commercial productions, is aspired to build up a personal film script, elevating the script with an array of emotions going through his mind as it could culminate in a life changing moment for him. He has worked as an assistant director, editor and as a sound recordist, but he pinned hopes on becoming an independent filmmaker. However, he faces stumbling blocks in fulfilling his filmmaking ambitions, due to failing to get the support of industry backers. In a turn of events, he becomes pessimistic and loses his focus and determination, becoming addicted to alcohol.

== Cast ==
- Karnan Kanapathy as Karthi
- Rubini Sambanthan as Peggy
- Rupini Krishnan as Shoba
- Tinesh Sarathi Krishnan as Mazhaikannan

== Theme ==
The film sheds light on the plight of the independent Tamil filmmakers in Malaysia whose novel ideas are being rejected due to the biases that mainstream Malaysian culture holds towards artists hailing from minority ethnic backgrounds. The film also critiques the Malaysian film industry as a whole, portraying the grievances that the Malaysian Tamil film industry faces due to the undue pressure exerted by the influence of the South Indian Tamil film industry. In particular, the film explores the tropes of the Indian Tamil industry, including commercial masala elements, action-packed sequences, songs and dance choreography, which Malaysian Tamil filmmakers are also expected to deliver in their work instead of more unique concepts.

== Reception ==
Niikhiil Akhiil of High On Films wrote, "Fire on Water [...] is a soulful film that gives a 360-degree perception of how individuality can break a person into pieces when placed in a biased spectrum of acceptance".
