= Kuzhandaiyum Deivamum =

1965 film by Krishnan–Panju

- Theatrical release poster
- Directed by: Krishnan–Panju
- Screenplay by: Javar Seetharaman
- Based on: The Parent Trap by David Swift
- Produced by: A. V. Meiyappan
- Starring: Jaishankar; Jamuna
- Cinematography: S. Maruti Rao; G. Vittal Rao
- Edited by: Panjabi; Vittal
- Music by: M. S. Viswanathan
- Production company: AVM Productions
- Release date: 19 November 1965
- Running time: 167 minutes
- Country: India
- Language: Tamil

Kuzhandaiyum Deivamum (transl. Child and God) is a 1965 Indian Tamil-language children's drama film directed by Krishnan–Panju and written by Javar Seetharaman. It is based on the American film The Parent Trap (1961) which in turn was based on Erich Kästner's 1949 German novel Lisa and Lottie (German: Das doppelte Lottchen). The film stars Jaishankar and Jamuna, with Nagesh, Sundarrajan, G. Varalakshmi, Santha, Kutty Padmini, M. S. S. Bhagayam and V. R. Thilagam in supporting roles. It revolves around a couple who separate, and the efforts of their twin daughters to reunite them.

Kuzhandaiyum Deivamum was produced by A. V. Meiyappan via AVM Productions, photographed by S. Maruti Rao and G. Vittal Rao, edited by Panju and features music by M. S. Viswanathan. The film was released on 19 November 1965, became a commercial success, and won the National Film Award for Best Feature Film in Tamil. Krishnan–Panju remade the film twice; in Telugu as Leta Manasulu (1966) and in Hindi as Do Kaliyan (1967). It was also remade in Malayalam as Sethubandhanam (1974) and in Kannada as Makkala Bhagya (1976).

== Plot ==
Chandrasekar "Sekar", Sundaram and Sathyabama "Bama" are college-mates in Madurai. Bama's parents – the henpecked Ramalingam and domineering Alamelu – own a bus company. Due to Alamelu's influence, Bama takes after her mother's ways. Sekar survives on scholarship provided by Ramalingam because the former's grandfather helped Ramalingam, but is unaware as money is always sent to him through a lawyer. Sekar and Bama fall in love. Alamelu objects, and Sekar leaves Bama, but at her insistence, Alamelu agrees for their wedding after finding Sekar intelligent and smart. Post-wedding, Sekar moves into Bama's house. He is appointed as the manager of the bus company, but is frustrated over lacking the clout to decide or to handle financial matters.

A year later, Bama gives birth to twin girls Lalitha "Lalli" and Padmini "Pappi". Sekar continues to struggle working under Alamelu. When she insults Sekar's friends who came as guests for an official event, an infuriated Sekar decides to leave the house. He asks Bama to come with him, but as Bama shows hesitation and tries to pacify Sekar, Alamelu pushes her into a room. Bama falls unconscious due to the push. An unaware Sekar continues knocking on her door asking her to come with him. He mistakenly believes she is reluctant to accompany him, and leaves with Pappi for Singapore, where he becomes an estate manager. Bama publishes advertisements unsuccessfully seeking them.

A few years later, Sekar returns to Madurai and Pappi joins the school where Lalli studies. Nirmala, Pappi's newly appointed dance teacher, plots to exploit Sekar with the help of her mother Sogusu. Sundaram, who is unemployed after losing multiple jobs, joins Sekar and tries to unite him and Bama. Nirmala and Sogusu move into Sekar's house. Pappi and Lalli fight during their school picnic, and are forced to share a room for the night as punishment, during which they start bonding and also realise that they are twins.

Sekar becomes ill and Nirmala serves him alcohol. He becomes drunk, and Nirmala tricks him into sexually pursuing her. When he falls unconscious in bed, Nirmala and Sogusu stage it to appear like he had sex with Nirmala. The next morning, Sekar, who cannot remember what happened, thinks he impregnated Nirmala. He promises to marry her to save her from shame.

Pappi and Lalli agree to swap identities for a while; after the picnic ends, Pappi goes to Bama as Lalli, and Lalli to Sekar as Pappi. Lalli is against her father marrying Nirmala. She later learns about Nirmala and Sogusu's true colours and informs Pappi over phone. Sundaram overhears this and realises the twins swapped identities but promises to support them. Sundaram's attempt to expose Nirmala causes Sekar to repeatedly slap him. Lalli demands that Nirmala leave the house. Enraged, Nirmala, pushes Lalli and she faints.

Sundaram informs Pappi over phone about Lalli's injury and when she cries on learning this, Ramalingam and Bama learn about the identity swap. Bama and Pappi rush to meet Lalli. On regaining consciousness, Lalli reveals her true identity to her father. Bama meets Sekar and unsuccessfully begs him for forgiveness. Sekar decides to keep both girls and throws Bama out of his house, but she chooses to wait outside the house. The girls, locked in a room, pray to Murugan to unite their parents, and Lalli remembers an earlier suggestion by Sundaram that praying at the Murugan Temple, Palani would be effective. When attempting to escape, they meet Sogusu and share their plans. Sogusu, seeing an opportunity to rid them, helps them out.

The next day, Sogusu sends a killer with the girls, lying that he is their bodyguard. Sekar finds Bama still waiting outside his house, and refuses Sundaram's pleas to accept her. Sekar later overhears Nirmala and Sogusu conversing and realises they manipulated his relationship with Nirmala and their current plan to kill the girls to usurp his wealth. Enraged, he disowns Nirmala and rushes with Bama to Palani to save the girls. Lalli realises her bodyguard is a killer and informs Pappi. They escape to the temple through the hills, but the killer catches up. He attempts to kill them but a snake kills him instead. The family reunites.

== Cast ==
Male cast

- Jaishankar as Chandrasekar "Sekar"
- Nagesh as Sundaram
- Sundarrajan as Ramalingam

Female cast

- Jamuna as Sathyabama "Bama"
- G. Varalakshmi as Alamelu
- Santha as Nirmala
- Kutty Padmini Lalitha "Lalli" and Padmini "Pappi"
- M. S. S. Bhagayam as Sogusu
- V. R. Thilagam as Pankajam

== Production ==
M. Kumaran of AVM Productions saw the American film The Parent Trap (1961), based on Erich Kästner's German novel Lisa and Lottie, and saw potential for a Tamil version of it; he persuaded his brother Saravanan to watch the film. Saravanan complied, but was sceptical over the story's commercial viability if filmed in Tamil and also felt audience would not be receptive towards the concept of divorce, although Kumaran remained adamant. They later asked Javar Seetharaman to watch The Parent Trap and if he could Indianise it in his screenplay; AVM was impressed with his screenplay. Saravanan said Seesumpatti Rajagopal wrote the climax portions. Krishnan–Panju were selected to direct the film, titled Kuzhandaiyum Deivamum. Cinematography was handled by S. Maruti Rao and G. Vittal Rao, art direction by A. K. Sekar, and Panju edited the film under the pseudonym "Panjabi". Jaishankar was selected to play the male lead and was paid ₹10,000 (equivalent to ₹670,000 or US$6,900 in 2023). Kutty Padmini portrayed twin sisters; in the scenes where both characters appear, split screen and body double techniques were used. The climax was shot at Palani. A real snake was brought for filming at the time, but Padmini, unlike other South Indian child actors, was unafraid of the snake.

== Soundtrack ==
The music was composed by M. S. Viswanathan. The song "Pazhamuthir Solaiyile" is set in the Abheri raga, and "Enna Vegam Nillu Bhama" is set in Shivaranjani. The song "Anbulla Maanvizhiye" was remixed by Rafi in the film Jaggubhai (2010), and "Enna Vegam" was remixed by Mursak in Kadhal Meipada (2011). Randor Guy of The Hindu wrote, "One of the major factors contributing to the success of the movie was its melodious music composed by M. S. Viswanathan. Many of the songs became hits and are still remembered today".

Track listing
No.	Title	Lyrics	Singer(s)	Length
1.	"Enna Vegam Nillu"	Vaali	T. M. Soundararajan, A. L. Raghavan	4:42
2.	"Anbulla Maan Vizhiyae"	Vaali	T. M. Soundararajan, P. Susheela	4:47
3.	"Naan Nandri Solven"	Vaali	M. S. Viswanathan, P. Susheela	3:48
4.	"Anbulla Mannavane" (sad)	Vaali	T. M. Soundararajan, P. Susheela	3:32
5.	"Kuzhandaiyum Deivamum"	Kannadasan	P. Susheela	3:57
6.	"Kuzhandaiyum Deivamum" (campfire song)	Kannadasan	P. Susheela	1:30
7.	"Pazhamuthir Solaiyilae"	Vaali	P. Susheela	4:12
8.	"Ahah Idhu Nalliravu"	Kannadasan	L. R. Eswari	4:04
9.	"Kozhi Oru Koottile"	Kannadasan	M. S. Rajeswari	2:54
Total length:				33:26

== Release and reception ==
Kuzhandaiyum Deivamum was released on 19 November 1965. The Tamil magazine Ananda Vikatan, in a review dated 19 December 1965, applauded Padmini's performance and stated that she was the sole reason to watch the film, which the reviewer called childish. Writing for Sport and Pastime, T. M. Ramachandran criticised the film's lack of originality, but called it a "clever adaptation" of The Parent Trap, and described Padmini's dual role performance as the film's "pièce de résistance". Kalki appreciated the cast performances, but criticised the film for lacking AVM's signature touch. K. Kamaraj, then the Chief Minister of Tamil Nadu, appreciated the film mainly for the twins' performance, and was initially unaware they were played by the same actress. The film was a commercial success, running for over 100 days in theatres. At the 13th National Film Awards, it won in the Best Tamil Film category.

== Remakes ==
Krishnan–Panju remade the film twice; in Telugu as Leta Manasulu (1966) and in Hindi as Do Kaliyan (1967). It was also remade in Malayalam as Sethubandhanam (1974) and in Kannada as Makkala Bhagya (1976).

== Bibliography ==
- Dhananjayan, G. (2014). Pride of Tamil Cinema: 1931–2013. Blue Ocean Publishers. OCLC 898765509.
- Glaser, Ed (2022). How the World Remade Hollywood: Global Interpretations of 65 Iconic Films. McFarland & Company. ISBN 978-1-4766-4467-7.
- Saravanan, M. (2013) [2005]. AVM 60 Cinema (in Tamil) (3rd ed.). Rajarajan Pathippagam. OCLC 1158347612.
- Sundararaman (2007) [2005]. Raga Chintamani: A Guide to Carnatic Ragas Through Tamil Film Music (2nd ed.). Pichhamal Chintamani. OCLC 295034757.
