= Premgi Amaren =

Indian actor, comedian (born 1979)

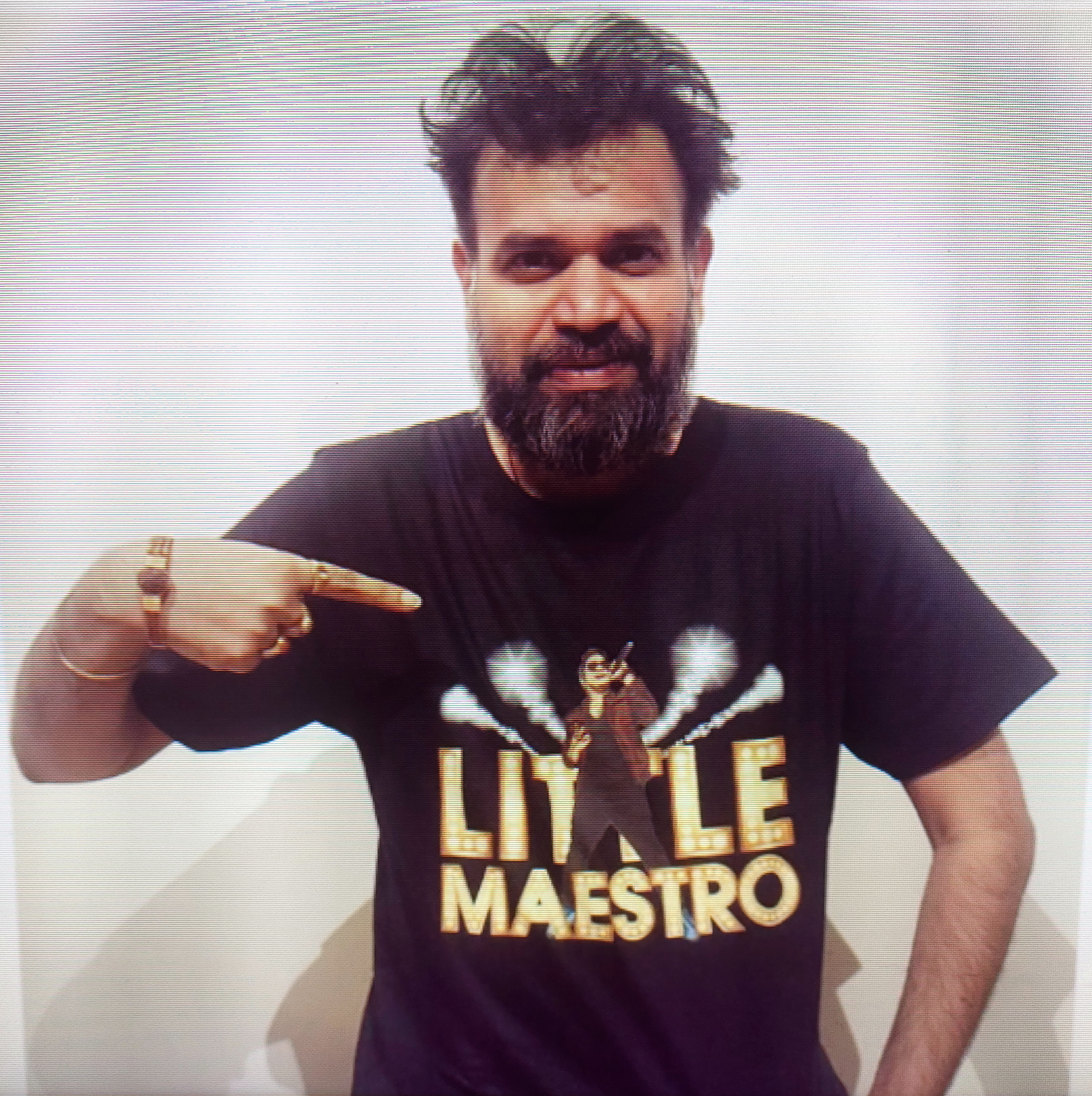

Background information
- Also known as: Premgi Amaren, Prem G
- Born: Prem Kumar Gangai Amaren; 26 February 1979 (age 47)
- Occupations: Actor, comedian, composer, singer, rapper
- Years active: 2006–present
- Spouse: Indhu (m. 2024)

Prem Kumar Gangai “Premji” Amaren (born 26 February 1979; /preɪmdʒi/) is an Indian singer, composer, songwriter, actor and comedian. The son of composer and director Gangai Amaran, he often composes rap songs in Tamil cinema and is known for his comical performances in his elder brother Venkat Prabhu's films.

He is also best known for his catchphrases "Enna koduma sir idhu?" (transl. What atrocity is this, sir?) and "Evvalavo pannitom, itha panna mattoma?" (transl. We've done so much, won't we do this also?), the former being a modified version of a famous dialogue used by Prabhu in Chandramukhi (2005).

== Career ==
In 1997, Premgi planned to enter the film industry as a director with a project titled Wanted starring his elder brother and S. P. B. Charan. The film, which had his younger cousin as music composer and his father and S. P. Balasubrahmanyam as comedians, did not complete shoot.

In 2005, he became an independent music director with Gnabagam Varuthe, starring his brother.

Primarily interested in composing music, Premgi then started his career as an assistant and additional music programmer to his cousin and film music composer Yuvan Shankar Raja, turning a playback singer, singing mostly the rap portions in Yuvan Shankar Raja's compositions, before working with other music composers as well. Working with Yuvan Shankar Raja, he also remixed some of his compositions for the soundtrack albums, the first being "Loosu Penne" from the film Vallavan (2006).

In 2006, however, he made his acting debut in Silambarasan's Vallavan as the heroine's friend, following which he starred in his brother Venkat Prabhu's directorial debut Chennai 600028 (2007), in which he played Seenu. The movie went on to become the year's biggest summer blockbuster, establishing Premgi as a comedy actor.

After that, he composed for Agathiyan's Nenjathai Killathe (2008) and for Thozha (2008), in which he played one of the leading roles as well. Apart from film music, he composed music for an episode titled Planet Galatta II – Adra Sakkae on Singapore's satellite channel, "Mediacorp Vasantham". He joined with his brother for his next film Saroja (2008), which fetched him accolades for his performance as Ganesh Kumar.

He appeared as a lead character in his elder brother's Goa (2010), before going on to make further appearances in Mankatha (2011) and Settai (2013). He made his Malayalam debut in North 24 Kaatham (2013). In the upcoming Maanga, he plays the lead character and also works as the music composer. He has acted in Chennai 600028 II (2016) which is a sequel of the super-hit movie Chennai 600028.

Amaren composed a song with singer Suresh Peters called "The One Anthem", and it was made as a tribute to the legend Michael Jackson.

== Personal life ==
Premgi is the son of musician Gangai Amaran, and the younger brother of film director and actor Venkat Prabhu. Film composer Ilaiyaraaja is his uncle, while Yuvan Shankar Raja, Karthik Raja and Bhavatharini are his cousins. He married Indu on 9 June 2024 at Thiruthani Murugan Temple. They have a daughter who was born on 19 November 2025.

His stage name, Premgi, is actually a spelling error, as it is meant to be "Prem G.", the G standing for his father.

== Filmography ==
=== As actor ===
Films

List of Premgi Amaren film acting credits
Year	Title	Role	Notes
1982	Payanangal Mudivathillai	Himself	Uncredited appearance in the song "Thogai Ilamayil"
2003	Punnagai Poove	Himself	Special appearance
2003	Whistle		Uncredited
2005	Kanda Naal Mudhal	Himself	Special appearance
2006	Vallavan	Swapna's friend	
2007	Chennai 600028	Seenu	
2007	Satham Podathey	Ravichandran's friend	
2008	Thozha	Arivazhagan	
2008	Santosh Subramaniam	Sekhar	
2008	Sathyam	Bora	
2008	Saroja	Ganesh Kumar	Nominated—Vijay Award for Best Comedian
2008	Silambattam	Himself	Special appearance
2010	Goa	Saamikannu (Sam)	
2011	Mankatha	Prem	Won—Edison Award for Best Comedian
2011	Mankatha	Prem	Won—ITFA Best Supporting Actor Award
2012	Podaa Podi	Himself	Special appearance
2013	Onbadhule Guru	Charles	
2013	Settai	Cheenu	
2013	North 24 Kaatham	Vyomkesh	Malayalam film
2013	Biriyani	Parasuram	
2014	Vadacurry	Phone Seller	Special appearance
2014	Salim	Himself	Special appearance
2014	Theriyama Unna Kadhalichitten	Himself	Special appearance
2015	MGR Sivaji Rajini Kamal	Premgi	Guest appearance
2015	Masss	Jetli	
2015	Maanga	Shiva	
2015	Yatchan	Himself	Guest appearance
2016	Narathan	Narathan	
2016	Ennama Katha Vudranunga	Himself	Cameo
2016	Chennai 600028 II	Seenu	
2017	Mupparimanam	Himself	Cameo
2018	Tamizh Padam 2	Himself	Special appearance
2019	Simba	Simba	
2019	Zombie	Himself	Cameo
2020	RK Nagar	Himself	Released on Netflix; Guest appearance
2021	Kasada Thapara	Bala	Released on SonyLIV; Segment : Kavasam
2021	Maanaadu	Eeswara Moorthy	
2021	Tamil Rockers	Jeeva	
2022	Manmadha Leelai	Veer	Guest appearance also music composer
2022	Prince	Bhoopathy	
2023	Custody	Prem	
2023	Sathiya Sothanai	Pradeep	
2024	The Greatest of All Time	Seenu	
2025	Dinasari	Prem	
2025	Vallamai	Saravanan	
2026	Happy Raj	Priest	Cameo appearance

Key
†	Denotes films that have not yet been released

Web series

List of Premgi Amaren web series acting credits
Year	Title	Role	Notes
2021	Live Telecast	Bigil Sathya	
2023	Badep		Malaysia Tamil language TV series

== Discography ==
=== As music director ===
- Note: all films are in Tamil, unless otherwise noted.

Year	Film	Notes
2005	Gnabagam Varuthe	
2006	Thunichal	
2007	Chennai 600028	Background score only
2008	Nenjathai Killadhe	
2008	Thozha	
2008	Nannusire	Kannada film
2009	Adhe Neram Adhe Idam	
2009	Kasko	Telugu film
2010	Goa	Additional background score only
2014	Ennamo Nadakkudhu	
2015	Maanga	
2016	Achamindri	
2018	Party	Unreleased
2019	Zombie	
2019	RK Nagar	released on Netflix
2021	Kasada Thapara	Streaming release; Composed one song "Vaa Un Neram"
2021	Tamil Rockers	
2022	Manmadha Leelai	

=== Playback singer ===
==== Tamil songs ====
Year	Film	Song	Notes
1996	Ullaasam		Backing vocals
1998	Velai	"Kaalathukku Etta Gana"	Co-sung with Vijay and Nassar
2001	12B	"Anandam"	
2005	Thirupaachi	"Kannum Kannum"	Remake of "Chitti Nadumune" from Gudumba Shankar
2005	Raam	"Boom Boom"	
2005	Arinthum Ariyamalum	"Thee Pidikka"	
2005	Kanda Naal Mudhal	"Pushing It Hard"	Co-sung with Yuvan Shankar Raja, Clinton Cerejo, lyrics by Thamarai
2006	Manathodu Mazhaikalam	"Panivizhum Kaalam"	
2006	Azhagai Irukkirai Bayamai Irukkirathu	"Orampo Naina"	
2006	Vallavan	"Loosu Penne" (Club Mix)	Remixed by Premgi Amaren
2006	Pattiyal	"Kannai Vittu Kann Imaigal" (Remix)	Remixed by Premgi Amaren
2007	Chennai 600028	"Saroja Saman Nikalo"	
2007	Chennai 600028	"Jalsa"	
2007	Chennai 600028	"Jalsa" (Remix)	Remixed by Premgi Amaren
2008	Thozha	"Rendupakkam Singamda"	
2008	Thozha	"Oru Nayagan"	
2008	Nenjathai Killadhe	"Naanga Beeru Kudichaa"	
2008	Sathyam	"Ada Gada Gada"	
2008	Saroja	"Aaja Meri Soniye"	
2008	Ennai Theriyuma? (D)	"Yedho Yedho"	
2010	Goa	"Goa" (Club Mix)	Remixed by Premgi Amaren
2011	Mankatha	"Machi Open The Bottle"	
2011	Mankatha	"Vilayadu Mankatha" (Extended Dance Mix)	Remixed by Premgi Amaren
2012	Veyilodu Vilayadu	"Kattukadanga Puyalena"	
2013	Onbadhula Guru	"Theera Theera"	
2013	Biriyani	"Nahnh Na Nah" (Extended Dance Mix)	Remixed by Premgi Amaren
2013	Biriyani	"Mississippi	
2015	Masss	"Therikidhu Masss" (Gasa Gasa Mix)	Remixed by Premgi Amaren
2017	—N/a	"Friendship Anthem"	Independent song
2020	Plan Panni Pannanum	"Plan Panni"	
2021	Kodiyil Oruvan	"Slum Anthem"	
2021	Kasada Tabara	"Vaa Un Neram Vandhadhae"	Co-sung with Sakthi Amaran; Streaming release
2023	Badep	"But Andha Dealing Enakku Pudichirukku"	Malaysian Tamil Series
2023	Custody	"Ammani Rukkumani"	
2024	The Greatest of All Time	"Whistle Podu Theatrical"	
2024	Soodhu Kavvum 2	"Mandaikku Sooru Eruthey"	Co-sung with Karnan Kanapathy, Stephen Zechariah

==== Telugu songs ====
Year	Film	Song	Notes
2002	Vasu	"Naa Prema O Cheliya (Montages Music Bit)"	Uncredited
2004	Arya	"You Rock My World"	
2004	Gudumba Shankar	"Chitti Nadumune"	
2004	Vidyardhi	"Andhra Khiladi Vidyardhi"	chorus/rap portions
2007	Raju Bhai	"Evvare Nuvvu"	Remixed by Premgi Amaren
2008	Salute	"Ada Gada Gada"	
2008	Nenu Meeku Telusa?	"Yenno Yenno"	
2009	Kasko	"Whistle Kottu"	
2013	Biriyani (D)	"Bay Of Bengal" (Extended Dance Mix)	Remixed by Premgi Amaren
2013	Biriyani (D)	"Mississippi	
2023	Custody	"Ammo Nee Rukkumini"	

Kannada song

Year	Film	Song	Notes
2008	Nannusire	"Sanje Beachinalli"	

== Awards ==
International Tamil Film Awards

- Best Supporting Actor – Mankatha
