= Zombie Kadhali =

- Genre: Zombie; Romantic fantasy
- Directed by: Saran Z
- Starring: Jayshree Vijayan; James Devan Arokisamy; Chandhine Kaur; Hemaji
- Country of origin: Malaysia
- Original language: Tamil
- No. of seasons: 1
- No. of episodes: 22

Production
- Camera setup: Multi-camera
- Running time: approx.20-22 minutes per episode

Original release
- Network: Astro Vinmeen HD
- Release: 30 January – 6 March 2023

Zombie Kadhali is a Malaysian Tamil-language television series directed by Saran Z, starring Jayshree Vijayan, James Devan Arokisamy, Chandhine Kaur and Hemaji in the lead roles. It was the first Tamil zombie romantic fantasy television series.

It premiered on Astro Vinmeen HD on 30 January 2023 on Monday to Thursday at 21:00 (MST) and ended with 22 episodes on 6 March 2023, and is also available on the digital platform Astro GO or stream anytime on demand.

== Cast ==
- Jayshree Vijayan
- James Devan Arokisamy
- Chandhine Kaur
- Hemaji
- Saha Champ
- Saii Naarayan
- Alvin Martin
- Arulini

== Original soundtrack ==
Released on 30 January 2023
No.	Title	Lyrics	Music	Artist	Length
1.	"Hey Sandalaa"	Saran Z	Saran Z	Hashmitha Selvam	3:15
2.	"Hey Sandalaa"	M.S Muthu	Saran Z	Anuranjani Anpalagan	3:22
3.	"Ennai Mannipaaya"	Yuwaji	Saran Z	Amos Paul	1:55
4.	"Meendum Meendum"	Saran Z	Saran Z	Vinod Kumar, Sanggari Krish	4:48
5.	"Ennai Thandipaaya"	Yuwaji	Saran Z	Chandine Kaur	1:49
6.	"Kulirum Katre "	Charan Dev	Saran Z	Edwin Louis Vishwanath, Thila Lakshman	3:33
