= List of Tamil-language media in Malaysia =

This is a list of Tamil language media in Malaysia.

== Tamil Television Station ==
Tamil language channel in Malaysia can be divided into 2, Channel that air fully programmers in Tamil or other Indian Language and channels and partly in Tamil language. Astro Vaanavil was first Tamil Malaysians channel, launched on 1 June 1996 and created by Astro.

Network	Launch	Genre	Note	ref
Astro Vaanavil	1 June 1996	General Entertainment	Most of its shows are brought directly from the Southern India subregion. There are also shows that have a local concept from Malaysia. In majority Astro Vaanavil broadcasts shows in Tamil language, as well as programs in Malayalam and Telugu languages	
Astro Box Office Movie Thangathirai	2000	Movies		
Astro Vellithirai	16 April 2007	Movie	24-hour non-stop Tamil movie channel	
Astro Vinmeen HD	18 October 2013	General Entertainment	It was first HD Channel in South East Asia	

== See also ==
- List of Tamil-language television channels
