= Manmadha Bullets =

- Genre: Comedy; Science fiction; Fantasy
- Written by: Martin R. Chantheran
- Directed by: Martin R. Chantheran (S1–2)
- Starring: Thevaguru Suppiah; Shabby; Ravin Rao; Parvin; Hamsni; Chandni Nagadurga; Kavitha; Akshara; Huumesh; Cellina Jay; Irfan Zaini; Thasha Krishnakumar; Jayashree Vijayan
- Theme music composer: Kash Villanz
- Country of origin: Malaysia
- Original language: Tamil
- No. of seasons: 2
- No. of episodes: 44

Production
- Producers: Elena Sumitra Thomas; Sean Abbarow
- Cinematography: Nileshkumar Rajendran
- Editor: Eswaran Nallathambi
- Camera setup: Multi-camera
- Running time: approx.20-22 minutes per episode
- Production companies: Keris Media Networks; Warriors Entertainment

Original release
- Network: Astro Vinmeen HD
- Release: 3 May 2021 – 13 April 2023

Manmadha Bullets is a Malaysian Tamil-language television series starring Thevaguru Suppiah, Shabby, Ravin Rao, Parvin, Hamsni, Chandni Nagadurga, Kavitha, Akshara, Huumesh, Cellina Jay, Irfan Zaini, Thasha, Krishnakumar and Jayashree Vijayan.

The first season aired on Astro Vinmeen HD from 3 May to 31 May 2021, on Monday to Friday at 21:00 (MST) and ended with 22 Episodes. This drama is available for worldwide streaming on Astro Ulagam.

The second season was aired on Astro Vinmeen HD from 8 March – 13 April 2022, on Monday to Thursday at 21:00 (MST) and ended with 22 Episodes. It is available for streaming on via TV, Astro GO and On Demand with English and Malay subtitle.

== Series overview ==
| Series | Episodes | Originally released | | Time slot |
| Series | Episodes | First released | Last released | Time slot |
|---|---|---|---|---|
| 1 | 22 | 3 May 2021 | 31 May 2021 | Monday to Friday at 21:00 (MST) |
| 2 | 22 | 8 March 2023 | 13 April 2023 | Monday to Thursday at 21:00 (MST) |

== Cast ==
=== Season 1 ===
- Thevaguru Suppiah as Manmadhan (S1–2)
- Huumeesh Gunaseelan as Ambu (based off Vasantha, the assistant of Kamadeva and personifaction of spring season, according to Hinduism) (S1–2)
- Akshara Nair as Sara
- Ravin Rao Santheran as Krishnan
- Shabby as Gautham
- Vicky Rao as John
- Santeinii Chandra Bos as Swathi
- Kavitha Sinniah as Rebecca
- Hamsni Perumal as Bhavani
- Saharudin Bin Jamaludin as Chittu
- Mitchell R. Chantheran as Kamadhevan
- Martin R. Chantheran as Dharma

=== Season 2 ===
- Cellina Jay
- Chandni Nagadurga
- Irfan Zaini
- Thasha Krishnakumar
- Jayashree Vijayan
- Parvin Nair
- Riknaveen

== Production ==
"Manmadha Bullets" directed and written by Martin R. Chantheran, produced by Elena Sumitra Thomas and co-produced by Sean Abbarow.

== Original soundtrack ==
=== Season 1 ===
==== Part 1 ====
Released on 2021
| No. | Title | Lyrics | Music | Artist | Length |
|---|---|---|---|---|---|
| 1. | "Manmadha Bullets" | Maney Villanz | Kash Villanz | Kash Villanz; Shamini Shradha | 2:23 |

=== Season 2 ===
==== Part 1 ====
Released on 2023
| No. | Title | Lyrics | Music | Artist | Length |
|---|---|---|---|---|---|
| 1. | "Manmathan (Theme Song)" | Kash Villanz | Kash Villanz | Kash Villanz | 2:29 |
| 2. | "Manthira Vizh" | | Shane Xtreme | Parvin Nair Surendran; Usha Chandran; Shane Xtreme | 3:37 |
| 3. | "Urutture Nee" | | Neroshan Thanaseharan | Neroshan Thanaseharan | 1:34 |
| 4. | "Now I can Dance" | | Neroshan Thanaseharan | Neroshan Thanaseharan; Amos Paul | 2:57 |
