= Oliyum Oliyum =

Indian TV programme of Tamil film music

Oliyum Oliyum (English: Light and Sound) is a Tamil movie song compilation program on television popular during the late 1970s, 1980s and early 1990s. It aired at 7:30pm until 8:00pm on Fridays on Doordarshan, a Tamil regional network and features songs from Tamil movies. This was most popular entertainment program in Tamil Nadu after Tamil movies which aired on Sunday evenings.

== Songs ==
Songs shown on the channel include:

- "Nadiganin Kadhali Nadagam Yenadi" from Thayillamal Naanillai (1979)
- "Meghame Meghame" from Palaivana Solai (1981)
- "Paniyum Neeye Malarum Naaney" from Panimalar (1981)
- "Mazhaiye Mazhaiye Ilamai Muzhudhum Nanaiyum Varaiyil Vaa" from Amma (1982)

== Future ==
The popularity of the sole government owned-Doordarshan channel declined with the advent of cable, and similar channels such as Sun Music were introduced.

== See also ==
- Chitralahari
