= Ramanujar (TV series) =

- Genre: Historical drama
- Created by: Vaishnavi Media Works Limited
- Based on: Ramanuja
- Written by: Karunanidhi
- Directed by: Dhanush
- Creative director: Kutty Padmini
- Starring: Kaushik Narasimhan; Chanthirakanth; Gayathiri; Lakshmiraj; Balaji as Alavanthar; Girish Ayapath; Vijay Prasadh
- Theme music composer: Ravirakav; Music Thaiyanban
- Country of origin: India
- Original language: Tamil
- No. of episodes: 433

Production
- Producer: Vaishnavi Media Works Limited
- Editor: Muthu Krishnan
- Camera setup: Multi-camera
- Running time: approx. 22–24 minutes per episode
- Production company: Vaishnavi Media Works Limited

Original release
- Network: Kalaignar TV
- Release: 1 June 2015 – 27 January 2017

Ramanujar is an Indian Tamil historical soap opera, written by former Chief Minister of Tamil Nadu Dr. M.Karunanidhi, starring Gowsik, Chanthirakanth, Gayathiri and Lakshmiraj. It aired Monday through Friday on Kalaignar TV from 1 June 2015 to 27 January 2017 at 7:30PM IST for 433 episodes. It had been receiving the highest ratings of Tamil serials and received high praising from viewers.

== Plot summary ==
The story revolves around the life of the Vaishnavite Acharya, Ramanujar and his contributions to the Hindu religion.

== Cast ==
- Kaushik Narasimhan as Ramanuja
- Chanthirakanth as Nathamunigal
- Gayathiri as Ganthimathi
- Lakshmipathiraj as Kesava Somayaji (Died in serial)
- Balaji as Alavanthar ( Yamunacharya)
- Girish Ayapath as Periyanambigal
- Senthil as Marthandam
- Jayalaskhmi as Patti
- Vijay Prasadh as Eswara Battar
- K.R.S Kumar as Yadavaprakasar
- Suresh as Thirumalai Nambigal
- Ananth as Thirukoshti Nambigal
- Deepak as Maraner Nambi
- Ranganathan as Manakkal Nambi
- Aruna
- Pranav
- S.S.Vasan as Uyyakondar
- Dhanush as Thirukatchi Nambi
- Nakshatra as Thanjamaambal
- Syamanta Kiran as Andal (Koorathazhwan's wife)

== Production ==
The series was written by Karunanidhi, who also wrote the popular historical series Romapuri Pandian (2014–2016) and Thenpandi Singam. The drama marked his third collaboration with creative director and producer Kutty Padmini.

== International broadcast ==
The Series was released on 1 June 2015 on Kalaignar TV. The Show was also broadcast internationally on Channel's international distribution. It aired in Sri Lanka, Singapore, Malaysia, South East Asia, Middle East, Oceania, South Africa and Sub Saharan Africa on Kalaignar TV and also aired in United States, Canada, Europe on Kalaignar Ayngaran TV. The show's episodes were released on Kalaignar TV YouTube channel.

- (India) It airs in the Indian state of Andhra Pradesh on TTD Bhakthi channel Dubbed in Telugu language.
