= Annamalai (2014 TV series) =

Indian Tamil-language soap opera

- Genre: Soap opera
- Written by: A. Mohamed Ali
- Screenplay by: A. Mohamed Ali; DR Ila
- Directed by: I. Sunder; S.S. Vikneshwaran; A. Mohamed Ali; Nagaraj Veerappan
- Starring: James Kumar; Karthik Samasundram; Bharathi; Varman; Sri; Jemes Dorairaj
- Country of origin: Singapore
- Original language: Tamil
- No. of seasons: 3
- No. of episodes: 152

Production
- Editors: Arunbalaji D; G. Saravanan
- Camera setup: Multi-camera
- Running time: approx. 22-24 minutes per episode

Original release
- Network: MediaCorp Vasantham
- Release: 22 December 2014 – 31 March 2015

Annamalai is a Singaporean Tamil-language historical soap opera that aired on MediaCorp Vasantham. The series' first season was aired from 22 December 2014 to 31 March 2015 every Monday to Thursday at 10:00PM SST for 48 episodes.

The show starred James Kumar, Karthik Samasundram, Bharathi, Varman, Sri and Jemes Dorairaj among others. It was director by I. Sunder, S.s. Vikneshwaran, A. Mohamed Ali and Nagaraj Veerappan.

== Cast ==
- James Kumar as Rajan Nambi
- Karthik Samasundram as Chinnayah
- Bharathi as Sanya
- Varman as Kirshna
- Bala Ganapathi William as Venu
- Sri as Annamalai
- Jemes Dorairaj as Samy
- Thanga Mani as Mondoor
- M. Nagarajoo as Ammaiyappan
- Sathis Rao as Thambi
- Windz as Yin Seng
- Devarajan as Pandiyan
- Chettiyar N. Ragavan as Manickam
- R. Somasundram as Arumugam
- MS Maniam as Murugappan Chettiyar
- Udhaya Sundari as Sakunthala
- Sasirekha as Sampooram
- T. Nakulan as Pachai
- Lingam as Govindasamy
- Param as Veerasamy
- Shalini as Sundri
- Kogila as Ponni
- Shafina as Rukku
- Sonia Shamini as Pappa
- Loganathan as Dharmalingam
- Maalika Girish Panicker as Bharathanatya Master
- Muthuletcumi as wife of Dharmalingam
- Jeyaram as Sigamani
- Deshna as Aandal
- Mark as Roberson
- Perrin William as Simon Ross
- Sani Maia as wife of Simon Ross
- Jegan as Chokkalingam
- Muthu as Mandoor
- Sanggari as Letchumi
- Kristina Vinockri as Setha
- Jessie as Malathi
- Santhini as Young Saguthala
- Loorna Hong as Sweelin
- Tan as Law Kim Fat
- Antony as Sathisivam
- Poorani as Pavithra
- Rajeshwary as Maid
- Ks Maniam as Ratnam
- Maniam as Ponnusamy
- Bala as Mappilai

== Original soundtrack ==
=== Soundtrack ===
Track listing
No.	Title	Lyrics	Singer(s)	Length
1.	"Kalam Ethaiyum Marapathillai"	A. Mohamed Ali	Deepak
2.	"Festivel Song"	Yijwaji	Suguna Jeyaseelan; Thiaga Raja

== Seasons overview ==
Season	Episodes	Originally aired (Singapore dates)		Time
Season	Episodes	First aired	Last aired	Time
1	48	22 December 2014	31 March 2015	Mon-Thu 10:00PM
2	52	29 June 2015	1 October 2015	Mon-Thu 10:30PM
3	52	28 December 2015	31 March 2016	Mon-Thu 10:30PM

== Season 2 ==
The second season, titled Annamalai Day of Reckoning was aired 29 June 2015 to 1 October 2015 every Monday to Thursday at 10:30PM SST for 52 episodes.

== Season 3 ==
Annamalai
- Starring: Sri Venkatarageaven; Karthik Samasundram; James Kumar; Gayathri Segaran; Indra Chandran; Balakumaran
- No. of episodes: 152

Release
- Original network: MediaCorp Vasantham
- Original release: 28 December 2015 – 31 March 2016

Season chronology
- ← Previous; Series 2013 Next → Series 2015

Annamalai 3 (Tamil: அண்ணாமலை 3) is an Indian Tamil-language soap opera that aired Monday through Thursday on MediaCorp Vasantham from 28 December 2015 to 31 March 2016 at 10:30PM SST for 52 episodes.

The show starred Sri Venkatarageaven, Karthik Samasundram, James Kumar, Gayathri Segaran, Indra Chandran and Balakumaran among others. It was director by A. Mohamed Ali, I. Sunder and S.S. Vikneshwaran.

=== Plot ===
The story begins somewhere in southern India, with Annamalai leading a normal life. He is now married to Manikkam Chettiar's daughter Natchiammai. He recollects memories of how Simon Ross, the British lawyer, requested for him to care for the small boy and how they left for England.

=== Cast ===
- Sri Venkatarageaven as Annamalai
- Karthik Samasundram as Sinnayah
- James Kumar as Rajan Nambi
- Gayathri Segaran as Lalitha
- Indra Chandran as Kanchana
- Balakumaran as Balaji Rao
- Vaish as Gajalakshmi
- Vishnu as Gophi
- Clarence as Bosco
- Lingam as Govindasamy
- Sashirekha as Sampoornam
- Panneeirchelvam as Maasilamani
- Shahul Hameed as Investigation Officer
- Narain as Vishwa Rao
- Ravee Vellu as Masanam
- Varman Ohnadra Mohan as krishnan
- Bharathi Rani as Saniya
- Kokilatha as Theivanai
- Shabnam as Nacchammai
- Nachiyappan as Nachi Chettiyar
- R. Krishnavani as Annamalai Mother
- Thiyaga Rajan as Siva
- Jaanani Netra as Janani
- Usha Rani as Usha
- Noorul as Raaji
- Shreedhee Sajeev as Madhbala
- Debra as Ruth

=== Original soundtrack ===
==== Soundtrack ====
Tracklist
No.	Title	Lyrics	Singer(s)	Length
1.	"Vazhkai Enpathu Vidukathai"	A. Mohamed Ali	Murkesh	2:20

=== Awards ===
Pradhana Vizha 2016

- Best Actor - Karthikeyan Somasundaram
