= Ithu Namma Veedu =

- Also known as: Welcome Home
- Genre: Soap opera; Comedy; Family; Drama
- Screenplay by: Kumaresan; MD. Sivakanth (Dialogue)
- Story by: Frames Entertainment Pte Ltd
- Directed by: R. Virenthiran
- Starring: Narain; Udhaya; Jayaram; Kokila; Leena; Lingam; Iliyash
- Theme music composer: K.G Ranjith
- Country of origin: Singapore
- Original language: Tamil
- No. of episodes: 47

Production
- Producers: Manju; Radha
- Editors: N. Kannan; A.B.R Poopathi
- Camera setup: Multi-camera
- Running time: approx. 22–24 minutes per episode

Original release
- Network: MediaCorp Vasantham
- Release: 3 April – 29 June 2017

Ithu Namma Veedu (This is our house) is a 2017 Singaporean Tamil-language comedy-drama starring Narain, Udhaya, Jayaram, Kokila, Leena, Lingam and Iliyash. It replaced Iruvar and it broadcast on MediaCorp Vasantham from 3 April 2017 to 29 June 2017 for 47 episodes.

== Plot ==
It is a comedy drama about three family, A comedy riot ensued when Ajith (Narain), a successful self-made tycoon, opens an old age home in which the seniors live in comfort and luxury. Gayu (Udhaya) is a bubbly girl who tries her best to impress the guy of her dreams. Avinash (Jayaram), Ajith Cousin who is wildly jealous of Ajith good life and Avinash love Gayathiri but Gayathiri Love Ajith.

== Cast ==
Main cast

- Narain as Ajith Pillai
- Udhaya as Gayathiri (Gayu)
- Jayaram as Avinash (Ajith Cousin)
- Kokila
- Leena
- Durai Shiva as Lingam son
- Lingam
- Iliyash
- Jayanthi
- Yuvina as Devi
- Alikhan as Don Muthappa
- Kunaselan
- Parashakthi Azhagu
- T. Nagulan
- Nagaraj

Supporting Cast

- Kalaiyarasi
- Kayitha
- Rajith
- Gayathiri
- Viknesh
- Kasthuri
- Supra
- Thashmassri

== Original soundtrack ==
=== Title song ===
It was written by lyricist Parthiban Seetharaman, sung by Rita K.G Ranjith.

=== Soundtrack ===
Track list
No.	Title	Lyrics	Music	Length
1.	"Vanakkam Vanakkam; Title Song"	Parthiban Seetharaman	K.G Ranjith

== Background score ==
Composed by Vicknesh Saravanan.

== Broadcast ==
Series was released on 3 April 2017 on Mediacorp Vasantham. It aired in Singapore and Malaysia on Mediacorp Vasantham, Its full length episodes and released its episodes on their app Toggle.

== Awards ==
Pradhana Vizha 2018

- Best Actor in a Comedy Role - Jayaram
