= Kutty Padmini =

South Indian movie actress

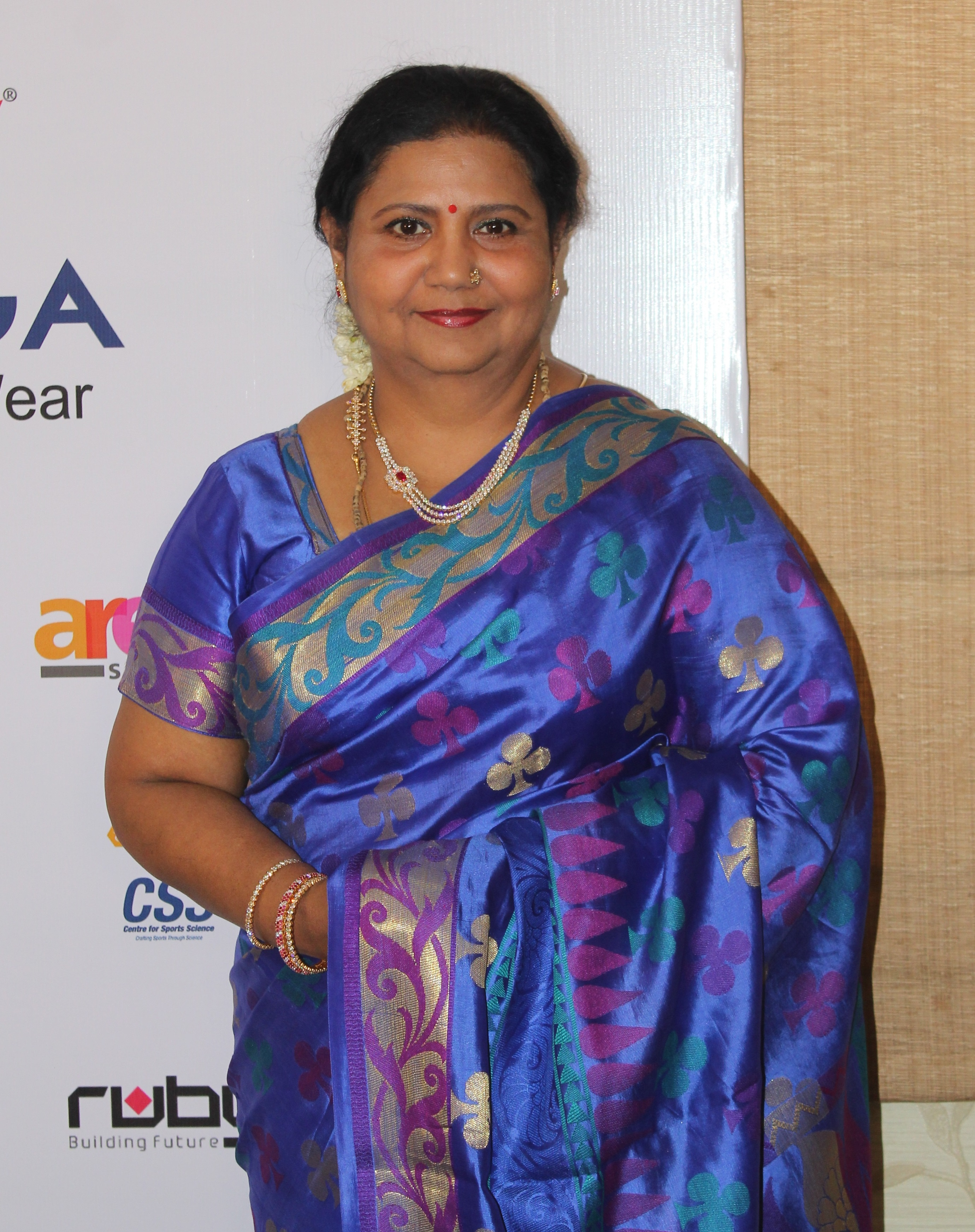
- Padmini in 2017
- Born: 5 June 1956 (age 70); Chennai, India
- Occupations: Actress; film producer; businesswoman
- Years active: 1959-present
- Notable work: Kuzhandaiyum Deivamum; Krishnadasi; Ramanujar; Romapuri Pandian
- Political party: Bharatiya Janata Party (2011–2022)
- Spouse: Prabu
- Children: 3

Kutty Padmini is an Indian actress who mainly works in Tamil cinema. She was a child star in her debut movie Abalai Anjugam (1959). She has also acted in Telugu, Kannada, Malayalam and Hindi movies. She made her debut in Tamil cinema at the age of 3. She has acted with prominent personalities of Tamil cinema, including Sivaji Ganesan, M. G. Ramachandran, Gemini Ganesan, Jaishankar, Rajinikanth and Kamal Haasan. She was the first female artist from Tamil Nadu to win the National Film Award for Best Child Artist for the movie Kuzhandaiyum Deivamum.

Kutty Padmini also established herself as supporting actress in movies such as Penmani Aval Kanmani, Aval Appadithan, Avargal, Sakalakala Sammandhi etc.., She made a foray into TV serials productions through her Vaishnavi Films Enterprises Limited and produced many works, including Krishnadasi (2016 TV series)(Hindi remake of the Tamil TV series of the same name), Romapuri Pandian and Ramanujar.

Kutty Padmini is also the executive member in Nadigar Sangam, one of the directors in Blue Ocean Films and Television Academy, managing director of Kreeda Sports Foundation and Brand owner of Kreeda Cup, an initiative by Kreeda Sports foundation to support young athletes.

== Career ==
Padmini was born as third girl child to Srinivasa Chakravathy and Radha Bai in 1956. Padmini entered filmdom at the age of 3 months. She went on to act in many movies as child artist. However, her notable film role was in the 1965 Tamil film Kuzhandaiyum Deivamum along with Jaishankar and Jamuna, where she played dual roles. She received the National Film Award for Best Child Artist for her performance and she is the first person from Tamil Nadu to have received this award since its inception. This film was subsequently remade in Telugu, Kannada, Malayalam and Hindi and she was felicitated for her role by both Kannada and Andhra state governments. She was also acted in various movies such as Pasamalar, Navarathri, Leta Manasulu, Odayil Ninnu, etc.., She stunned everyone with her performance in the movie Thiruvarutchelvar as a young girl "Ponni", who answered the King's three questions and also in Thirumal Perumai as young Andal, which was widely appreciated.

== Political life ==
Kutty Padmini joined BJP in the presence of party president Nitin Gadkari in February 2011.

== Filmography ==
=== Tamil ===
Year	Title	Role
1959	Abalai Anjugam	
1960	Deiva Piravi	
1961	Pasa Malar	Young Radha
1962	Azhagu Nila	Lakshmi
1962	Nenjil Or Aalayam	Dying Child
1962	Kaathiruntha Kangal	Lalitha, Shenbagam
1962	Avana Ivan	Meena
1963	Aasai Alaigal	Kannama
1964	Navarathiri	Lalitha Arputhara
1964	Vazhkai Vazhvatharke	Valli
1965	Kuzhandaiyum Deivamum	Lalli/Padmini "Pappi"
1966	Sadhu Mirandal	Preema
1966	Motor Sundaram Pillai	Rajee
1966	Anbe Vaa	
1967	Thiruvarutselvar	Ponni
1967	Naan	
1967	Anubavam Pudumai	
1968	Thirumal Perumai	Young Kothai
1969	Nam Naadu	Selvi
1969	Ulagam Ivvalavuthan	
1970	Maanavan	
1972	Naan Yen Piranthen	Anoushia
1974	Avalum Penthane	Nishalu
1974	Sisubalan	
1977	Avaragal	Gayathri
1978	Aval Appadithan	herself
1979	Nallathoru Kudumbam	
1981	Nandu	Lakshmi
1981	Arumbugal	
1986	Mella Thirandhathu Kadhavu	
1986	Thazhuvatha Kaigal	
1987	Oru Thayin Sabhatham	Mrs. Ravi
1987	Jallikattu	Kutty Amma
1987	Koottu Puzhukkal	
1987	Kani Nilam	
1987	Neethikku Thandanai	
1987	Ullam Kavarntha Kalvan	
1987	Thali Dhanam	
1988	Therkathi Kallan	
1988	Kan Simittum Neram	Vanni
1988	Illam	
1988	Therkathikkallan	
1988	Penmani Aval Kanmani	Kalpana
1989	Penn Buthi Pin Buthi & Nyayatharasu	
1989	Sakalakala Sammanthi	Vellaiamma
1990	Chathriyan	
1991	Karpoora Mullai	
1992	Pattathu Raani	
2018	Utharavu Maharaja	

=== Telugu ===
Year	Title	Role
1959	Daiva Balam	
1959	Illarikam	
1960	Shanthi Nivasam	
1961	Bhakta Jayadeva	
1962	Manchi Manasulu	
1963	Irugu Porugu	
1963	Pempudu Koothuru	
1965	Anthasthulu	
1966	Asthi Paraglu	Ammulu
1966	Sakunthala	Bharatha
1966	Leta Manasulu	(Puppy) / Lalitha (Lalli) (Dual role)
1967	Chikkadu Dorakadu	
1969	Eka Veera	
1969	Kadhanayakudu	
1969	Vichithra Kudubam	
1970	Pasidi Manasulu	
1971	Vichithra Thambathiyam	
1971	Amaayakuraalu	
1972	Vichitra Bandham	
1972	Kula Gouravam	
1978	Chilipi Krishnudu	College student
1982	Antha Banthalu	patient
1985	Jeevitha Bandham	
1986	Karu Diddina Kapuram	
1996	Pavithra Bandham	

=== Malayalam ===
Year	Title	Role
1964	School Master	
1965	Odayil Ninnu	Young Lakshmi
1965	Kuppivala	Tharabi
1973	Surya Gandhi	
1976	Aalinganam	
1977	Anandham Paramanandham	
1977	Aa Nimisham	
1978	Vayanadan Thamban	
1985	Anubandham	
1991	Ente Sooriya Puthri	

=== Kannada ===
Year	Title	Role
1963	Saaku Magalu	Babu (baby boy)
1965	Satya Harischandra	Lohitasya
1967	Sri Purandara Dasaru	
1976	Katha Sangama	Shoba (uncredited)

=== Hindi ===
Year	Title	Role
1963	Grahasthi	Abbitu
1963	Dil Ek Mandir	Uma
1987	Kudrat Ka Kanoon	

=== TV serials ===
Year	Title	Credited as				Language	Notes
Year	Title	Producer	Director	Writer	Acted	Language	Notes
1986	Shrimanji	✓	✓		✓	Hindi	
1986	Bhool Na Jhana	✓			✓	Hindi	
1987	Kishan Khanya	✓	✓		✓	Hindi	
1989	Tarazu	✓			✓	Hindi	
1991	Kittigadu	✓			✓	Tamil, Telugu, Hindi	
1991	Valar Pirai	✓			✓	Tamil	
1991	Vaishali	✓			✓	Tamil	
1992	Sangursh	✓			✓	Hindi	
1994	Aadhar Shila	✓	✓		✓	Hindi, Tamil	
1995	F.I.R	✓	✓		✓	Tamil	
1995	Kadamai	✓	✓		✓	Tamil	
1995	Kash Ma Kash	✓	✓			Hindi	
1995	Nijamana Uyarangal	✓				Tamil	
1995	Oliyum Oliyum	✓				Tamil	
1995	Thulasi Thalam	✓				Tamil	
1996	Ab Aaya Na Maza	✓	✓			Hindi	
1996	Sthree	✓	✓			Hindi	
1996	Dharm Adharm	✓				Hindi, Tamil	
1996	Anandha Rao Palli	✓				Telugu	
1997	Olimighu Bharatham	✓				Tamil	
1997	Ungal Viruppam	✓				Tamil	
1997	Nayagi	✓			✓	Tamil	
1997	Pen Ninaithal	✓		✓	✓	Tamil	
1998	Naveena Nakeeran	✓			✓	Tamil	
1999	Poomanam	✓	✓		✓	Tamil	
2000	Uravugal	✓				Tamil	
2000	Krishnadasi	✓		✓		Tamil	
2001	Jhala Khreedai	✓				Tamil	
2001	Nila	✓				Tamil	
2002	Chutti Payal Kittu	✓				Tamil	
2002	Swarangal	✓				Tamil	
2002	Kadhiravan	✓		✓		Tamil	
2002	Swaati Muthu	✓		✓		Kannada	
2002	Thillu Mullu	✓				Tamil	
2003	Cinta Bollywood (Part - I)	✓				Malay	
2003	Cinta Bollywood (Part - II)	✓				Malay	
	Masakan Afrikan Seletan	✓				Malay	
2004	Kana Kanden	✓				Tamil	
2004	Bairavi	✓		✓		Tamil	
2004	Malayu Aftrika	✓				-	
2004	Masakan India	✓				-	
2004	Teroka Afrika	✓				Malay	
2004	Teroka India	✓				-	
2004	Teroka Jaipur	✓				-	
	Avakai Girls	✓				Telugu	
2007	Kohara	✓	✓	✓		Hindi	
2007	Ammayi Kapuram				✓	Telugu	
	Kannadi Kadavugal	✓				Tamil	
2008	Kalasam			✓	✓	Tamil	Creative Head
2010	Bakthavijayam	✓				Tamil	
2010	Suryaputhri	✓				Tamil	
2012	Romapuri Pandian	✓	✓			Tamil	
2015	Ramanujar	✓	✓			Tamil	
2016	Krishnadasi	✓				Hindi	
2016	Thenpandi Singam	✓				Tamil	

=== Web series ===
Year	Title	Language	Channel	Notes					
Year	Title	Language	Channel	Notes	2017	Maya Thirrai	Tamil	ALTBalaji	As producer
2019	Police Diary 2.0	Zee5					Tamil		As producer
2020	Singa Penne	Zee5	As producer and actor				Tamil		
2021	Kuruthi Kalam	MXPLAYER	As producer				Tamil		

== Awards and honors ==
- National Award as the "Best Child Artiste" for the film Kuzhandaiyum Deivamum
- Kutty Padmini Actress Felicitated by Rotary Club of Madras
- Best Producer for Cinta Bollywood from former President of Singapore- S. R. Nathan
- Gold Award from Indian Content Leadership Awards in 2109 for best thriller content on an OTT platform- Maya Thirrai by Vaishnave Mediaa Works Limited
- Kalaimamani Award in 2011 from Tamil Nadu Iyal Isai Nataka Mandram.
- Lifetime Achievement award in the South Indian Cinematographers Association (SICA) Awards 2015
