= Yuttha Medai All Stars =

- Genre: Dance, Factual Entertainment, Reality
- Country of origin: Malaysia
- Original language: Tamil
- No. of episodes: 5

Original release
- Network: Astro Vinmeen HD
- Release: 10 December 2016 – 21 January 2017

Yuttha Medai All Stars is a Tamil language reality dance competition show from Malaysia. The show aired on Astro Vinmeen HD, Southeast Asia's first 24-hour general entertainment Tamil HD channel.

== Episode ==
Characters	Seasons													
Characters	1	2	3	4	5	6	7	8	9	10	11	12	13	14
James	M	M	M	M	M	M	M	M	M	M	M	M	M	M
Aaron	M	M	M	R	G									
Risnur	M	M	M	M	M	M	M	M	M	M	M	M		
Anas	M	M	M	R										
Zaquan	M	M	M	M	M	M	M	M	M	M	M	M	M	M
Arissa	M	R	R	R										
Dhia	M	M	M	M	M	M								
Adriana	M	M	M	G										
Dhiya	M	M	G											
Syasya	M (Note: credit main until Episode 11)	M	M	M	M	M						G		
Aziz	M	M	M	M	G									
Fatin	M	R	G				G							
Syafiqah	M	M	M	G										
Ryan		M	M	M	M	M	M	M	M	M	R	R	G	
Humaira		M	M	G			R							
Lukman		M	M	M	M	M	M	M						
Aisar	R	R	M	G			R							
Fateh				M	M	M	M	M	M	M	M	M	M	M
Dayana				M										
Umar				M	M	M	R							
Rina				M	M	M	M	M	M	M	M			
Zara				M	M	M	M	M	M					
Aina				M	M	M	M	M	M	M	M	M	G	
Faris				R	M	M	M							
Tihani				R	M	M	R	R	R					
Dini						M (Note: credit main from episode 12 but recurring from episode 1 to 11.)	M	M						
Vedharth					G	R	M	M	M	M	M	M	M	M
Farha						R	M	M	M	M	M	M	M	G
Arfina							M	M	M	M	M	G		
Putra								M	M	M	R			
Damia								M	M	M	M	M	G	
Elyana									M	M	M	M	M	M
Asyraf						R	R	R	R	M	M	G		
Sufi						R	R	R	R	R	R	M	M	G
Lucas											R	M	M	M
Ezra												M	M	M
Dania												M		
Puteri												M	M	M
Rizqi									R	R	G	G	M	M
Rayyan												G	M	M
Marian													M	M
Oviya													M	M
Hafiy												G		M
Adelia														M

Characters	Seasons													
Characters	1	2	3	4	5	6	7	8	9	10	11	12	13	14
Puan Bazlina	R	G				G				G		G	R	G
Cikgu Syukor	G												R	G
Kristy	G		G				R							
Puan Ros		G		G					R				G	G
Harris		R	R	G										
Cikgu Jamiah				R	R			G					G	G
Ayra				R										
Fawwaz				R	R				G				G	G
Syahmi					R					R	G		R	G
Melissa					G	R		R						
Zaqeera						R	R	R	R		G			G
Celestine							R							
Aydin									R	R	R		G	G
Jufri									R	R	G	G	G	R
Zarfan									R	R				G
Liyana									R		G			G
Tufayl													R	
Cikgu Izzudin													G	
Cikgu Umar													G	G
Cikgu Azwan													G	
Encik Nizam													G	G
Irsyad														G

Characters (Prev. Series)	Seasons													
Characters (Prev. Series)	1	2	3	4	5	6	7	8	9	10	11	12	13	14
Cikgu Idayu	R		G									G		
Aiman	S.G											S.G		
Richmond	G									G				
Wen Quan	G									G				
Haziq	R	G		R										
Daniel		S.G										S.G		
Mastura		G												
Stefanus			S.G			S.G		G	R			S.G		G
Ilhan			G											
Irfan			G											
Ataa			G				G							
Azlin			G											
Hui Ting			S.G											
Yi Ling			G											
Ashera				G									G	
Amir				G				G						
Idham						G	R							
Hariq						G	R		G					
Hanis							R							
Alina							R	G						
Amira							R							
Farrah								G			G			
Zulhlimi								R	R					G
Aidil								G						
Azizi								G						
Leo									S.G					
Jackson										G				
Shengjie										G				
Xuan Le										G				
Izyan											G			
Sabrina											G			
Saidah											G			
Nazrina											G			
Adlina											G			
Shafiqah											G			
Imran Othman											G			
Azzim											G	R		
Solehan											G			
Daeng											G	G		
Mathan											G			
Tinesh											G			
Suren											G			
Vino											G			
Pravieen											G			
Siva											G			
Leviya											G			G
Sarmishtha											G			
Guga											G			
Leysha											G			
Jiaern											G			
Qianying											G			
Siti											G			
Izah												G		
Cikgu Dashimah												G		
Cikgu Mahfuzah												G		
Jiarong												R		
Faez												G	R	R
Tuah												G		
Imran												G		
Fauzi												G		
Luqman												S.G		
Teoh													S.G	G
Lisa													S.G	
Afiq													G	
Haris													G	
Alya													G	
Diana													G	
Karthi													G	
Cecelia													G	
Danish													G	
Sofia													G	
Yashina													G	
