= Astro Vinmeen =

Malaysian television network

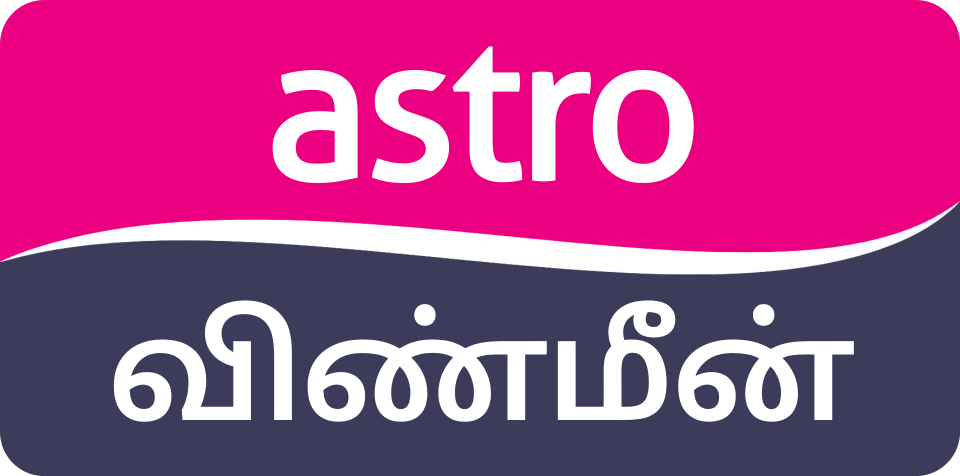
- Country: Malaysia
- Broadcast area: Malaysia
- Network: Astro

Programming
- Picture format: 16:9 HDTV (1080i)

Ownership
- Owner: Astro Malaysia Holdings
- Parent: Measat Broadcast Network Systems Sdn. Bhd. (Astro)
- Sister channels: Astro Vaanavil; Astro Vellithirai; Astro Thangathirai

History
- Launched: 18 October 2013 (Malaysia); 1 July 2015 (Singapore)
- Founder: Ananda Krishnan
- Closed: 1 July 2020 (Singapore)

Links
- Website: www.astroulagam.com.my

Astro Vinmeen (formerly known as Astro Vinmeen HD until November 2024) is a Tamil HDTV channel high-definition free-to-view commercial satellite entertainment television channel network that is co-owned by Southeast Asia's second richest man, Ananda Krishnan and Astro Malaysia Holdings. It is South East Asia's first 24-hour general entertainment Tamil HD channel. This channel features a variety of programs ranging from reality shows, English talk shows, travelogues, lifestyle programs, magic shows, Documentaries, celebrity cooking shows, classical Carnatic music shows, original Astro productions and blockbuster movies. It began broadcasting on 18 October 2013. Astro Vinmeen is part of the Basic HD channels, originally part of the Maharaja pack.

Selected programmes also aired on Astro Vaanavil. It also broadcasts content from Vasantham, Puthuyugam TV and Vendhar TV. The channel holds the Guinness World Records for the Longest Live Streamed festival, with 55 hours non-stop live streaming of Thaipusam festival on 22 to 25 January 2016.

Prior to Astro Vinmeen, the oldest Tamil HD channel was technically launched by Astro, on channel 222, however, the channel would only air as a pop-up channel to air grand finals of shows hosted by Astro or during festivals only.

== Programmes ==
=== Current programming ===
==== Drama ====
Judul	Nota
Pasange Series Season 3	Under Vinmeen Exclusive primetime slot
Idhayam Thotta Kathaigal(Rebroadcast	Rebroadcast, The drama used to run under Under Vinmeen Exclusive primetime slot
Ponni c/o Raani	Import drama from India
Gowri	Import Drama from Kalaignar TV (India)
Shirdi Sai	Hindi dramas dubbed into Tamil, imported from India
Kanniraasi	Import Drama from India
Aladdin – Naam Toh Suna Hoga	Hindi dramas dubbed into Tamil, imported from India

==== News ====
- Astro Seithigal

==== Reality Show ====
- MasterChef India – Tamil

==== Food and Travelogue ====
Title	Note
Rasikka Rusikka Reloaded Season 8	8th Season of Rasikka Rusikka
Kitchen Killadigal	Season-2

==== Animation ====
- Motu Patlu

=== Former programming ===
==== Drama/Series ====
===== Local Drama/Series =====
Title	Primere Episode	Final Episode
2020
Kalvanai Kandupidi	July 1, 2020	July 31, 2020
Kalyaanam 2 Kaathal	September 1, 2020	September 30, 2020
Yaar Avan	October 1, 2020	October 30, 2020
Ramarajan	November 2, 2020	November 30, 2020
Kuruthi Mazhai	December 1, 2020	December 31, 2020
2021
Serial Pei	January 4, 2021	January 30, 2021
Asura Vettai	February 1, 2021	February 27, 2021
Sivanthu Pochi Nenje	March 1, 2021	March 31, 2021
Mente	April 1, 2021	April 30, 2021
Manmadha Bullets	May 3, 2021	May 31, 2021
Ramarajan 2.0	Jun 1, 2021	Jun 31, 2021
Avatharam	July 1, 2021	August 6, 2021
Solli Tholeh (Rebroadcast)	August 7, 2021	August 20, 2021
Kavasam	Ogos 5,2021	Ogos 22,2021
Kalyaanam 2 Kaathal Season 2	November 8, 2021	January 12, 2022
2022
Kalyaanam 2 Kaathal Season 2	November 8, 2021	January 12, 2022
Kadhaanayagi	February 1, 2022	March 2, 2022
Iraivi Thirumagal Kaadu	March 3, 2022	April 1, 2022
Virus	April 4, 2022	April 29, 2022
Magarantham	August 1, 2022	September 28, 2022
Oru Kalaignanyin Diary	October 1, 2022	October 30, 2022
Venghaiyin Magan	November 7, 2022	December 16, 2022
Veera	December 19, 2022	January 27, 2023
2023
Veera	December 19, 2022	January 27, 2023
Zombie Kadhali	January 30, 2023	March 6, 2023
Manmadha Bullets Reloaded	March 7, 2023	April 15, 2023
Pasange Series	April 17, 2023	
Jeeyum Neeyum	July 3, 2023	July 28, 2023
Project Karma	July 29, 2023	August 24, 2023
Puranachandran Kudumbhathar	August 29, 2023	October 1, 2023
Akkam Pakkam	October 2, 2023	November 12, 2023
Badep	November 13, 2023	August 12, 2023
2024
Miss Rasathi	February 26, 2024	March 6, 2024
Manggai Nee	March 8, 2024	March 19, 2024
Iravu Vannangal	March 25, 2024	April 17, 2024
Pasange Series Season 2	August 12, 2024	February 7, 2025
2025
Pasange SeriesSeason 2	August 12, 2024	February 7, 2025
Naan Sethu Pozhachavanda	February 17, 2025	March 16, 2025
Kavitha Savitha	March 17, 2025	April 9, 2025
Kambathu Ponnu	April 14, 2025	May 14, 2025
House Kanavan	May 26, 2025	July 11, 2025
Aadhira	May 26, 2025	August 29, 2025
Magarantham 2	September 1, 2025	October 10, 2025
Urvasi	October 13, 2025	October 27, 2025
Idhayam Thotta Kathaigal	October 28, 2025	December 3, 2025

==== Singapore Drama/Series ====
Singapore Seried from Mediacorp Vasantham

- Singa Airlines
- Bimbangal
- Thalli Pogathey
- Kannum Kannum Kolaiyadital
- Moondravathu Kann
- Iruvar
- Azhagiya Tamizh Magal S1
- Arivaan
- Azhagiya Tamizh Magal S2
- Yaar?
- Yaar ? (Season 2)
- Yaar ? (Season 3)
- Vettai S4
- Uyire
- Naam
- Kanne Kaniyamude

==== Variety Show ====
- Samayal Singgari
- Rasikka Rusikka S6
- Gun Kannayiram (Comedy Sitcom)
- Rasikka Rusikka S1, S2, S3, S4, S5
- Thigil (Horror Documentary)
- Pei Vettai (Horror Documentary)
- KL to Karaikudi S1 and S2 (Travel Vlogs)

==== Reality Show ====
- Aattam Returns
- Yuttha Medai All Stars
- Yuttha Medai Junior
- Yuttha Medai Senior
- Vaanavil Superstar
- Big Stage Tamil

== Notable hosts ==
- Bala Ganapathi William
- Nithya Shree
- Punnagai Poo Gheetha
- Sangeeta Krishnasamy
