= Romapuri Pandian =

- Logo
- ரோமாபுரி பாண்டியன்
- Genre: Soap opera Historical; Drama
- Written by: Karunanidhi
- Directed by: Danush
- Creative director: Kutty Padmini
- Starring: O.A.K. Sundar; Devipriya; Lavanya
- Country of origin: India
- Original language: Tamil
- No. of seasons: 01
- No. of episodes: 543

Production
- Producers: Kutty Padmini; Kirtana Fanning
- Production location: Tamil Nadu
- Camera setup: Multi-camera
- Running time: approx. 20-22 minutes per episode
- Production company: Vaishnavi Media Works Limited

Original release
- Network: Kalaignar TV
- Release: 26 May 2014 – 29 April 2016

Related
- Kurinji Malar; Odi Vilaiyadu Pappa

Romapuri Pandian (Tamil: ரோமாபுரி பாண்டியன்) is a 2014-2016 Tamil historical drama that aired Monday through Friday on Kalaignar TV from 26 May 2014 to 29 April 2016 at 9:00PM (IST) for 543 episodes. The show written by Karunanidhi and Creative director by Kutty Padmini.

The show starred O.A.K. Sundar, Devipriya, Lavanya, Yuvanraj Nethran, Murali Krrish, Vetri and Sathya among others. It was produced by Kutty Padmini for Vaishnavi Media Works Limited, director by Danush.

== Plot summary ==
Romapuri Pandian is a historical novel that talks about the king Peruvazhuthi Pandian who tries to establish a relationship with the Roman Empire. "The serial will reflect the Tamil culture of a bygone era in an entertaining manner," adds the representative.

== Cast ==
- O.A.K. Sundar as Karikalan
- Sathya as Killi Vallabha
- Yuvanraj Nethran as Manimaran
- Murali Krrish as Mahendran
- Devipriya as Muthunagai
- Lavanya as Princess Thamarai
- Shwetha as Princess Malarkodi
- Shamili as Princess Kalaivani
- Shilpa as Rani Mangamma
- Minnal Deepa as Karun Kuzhali
- Shaji Jaganathan
- Abhinaya Murali
- Sreenidhi as Perunthevi
- Poorni as Vana Mohini
- Vetrimaran
- Abith Singh as Mangamma's son
- Divya Krishnan

== Awards ==
Year	Award	Category	Recipient	Result
2015	The 46 Mylapore Academy Awards	Best Actress	Devipriya	Won
2015	The 46 Mylapore Academy Awards	Best Child Artiste	Abit Singh	Won

== International broadcast ==
The Series was released on 26 May 2014 on Kalaignar TV. The Show was also broadcast internationally on Channel's international distribution. It was aired in Sri Lanka, Singapore, Malaysia, South East Asia, Middle East, Oceania, South Africa and Sub Saharan Africa on Kalaignar TV and also aired in United States, Canada, Europe on Kalaignar Ayngaran TV. The show's episodes were released on Kalaignar TV YouTube channel.

== See also ==
- List of programs broadcast by Kalaignar TV
