= Michael Muthu =

Indian director

- Born: 1968 (age 57–58); Chennai, India
- Occupations: Director, writer

Michael Muthu is an Indian director, writer and actor who has worked on theatre productions and films. He is based in Chennai.

== Career ==
Michael Muthu started his career in theatre after finishing his schooling, and was a member of the Loyola Theatre Society during his first two years of college. In 1991, he became the founder of the Chennai-based theatre group, Boardwalkers. He has since worked on productions including God, Biloxi Blues, The Hairy Ape, Sleuth, The Pied Piper of Hamlin, Jesus Christ Superst, and Oliver Twist. In the early 1990s, he starred alongside M. Night Shyamalan in the director's English film Praying with Anger (1992), while he also played supporting roles in French and Italian productions based in India in the late 1990s.

In 2002, Michael began working on directing an English film titled The Girl, and despite it completing production, it was previewed to audiences but not released theatrically as he could not find distributors. In January 2017, he announced plans to make a bilingual film titled The Way Things Are in English and Theeviram in Tamil, produced by Sameer Bharat Ram. Starring Gokul Anand, Amzath Khan and Arjun Chidambaram in the lead roles, the film was shot in 2017 and the Tamil version had a delayed OTT release on the Simply South platform in November 2020.

In a rare Indian film appearance, he starred in Shankar's 2.0 (2018) as a police officer, working alongside Rajinikanth. He also portrayed the role of Sushant Singh Rajput's father in his final film, Dil Bechara (2020).

== Partial filmography ==
=== As actor ===
Year	Film	Role	Language	Notes
1992	Praying with Anger	Sanjay	English	
1999	Les Montagnes Bleues	Srinivas	French	
1999	Branchie	Sarwar	Italian	
2006	That Four-Letter Word	Theatre director	English	
2018	2.0	Police officer	Tamil	
2020	Dil Bechara	Immanuel Rajkumar Sr	Hindi	

=== As director ===
Year	Film	Language	Notes
2020	Theeviram	Tamil	
