= Pradhana Vizha 2014 =

Pradhana Vizha Year 2014 (14th Edition)
- Awarded for: "Excellence for local Indian television industry in Singapore"
- Sponsored by: xinmsn
- Date: 31 July 2014
- Location: The Ritz-Carlton, Millenia Singapore
- Country: Singapore
- Presented by: MediaCorp; Vasantham
- Hosted by: Udaya Soundari; Saravanan Ayyavoo; Jaynesh Isuran

Highlights
- Most awards: Veethi Varai (5)

Television/radio coverage
- Network: MediaCorp Vasantham; Oli 96.8FM

The 2014 Pradhana Vizha is a television award ceremony held in Singapore by Vasantham TV. The 14th edition of Vasantham's prestigious Awards extravaganza, Pradhana Vizha saw a total of 27 awards being given out to the best in the local Indian television industry in Singapore. The Lifetime Achievement Award were awarded to Manimaran Thorasamy.

The award show were telecast live by Vasantham MediaCorp and Oli 96.8FM .The event was hosted by Udaya Soundari, Saravanan Ayyavoo and Jaynesh Isuran

== Nominees and Winner ==
Below are the nominees and winner of 2014 Pradhana Vizha based on the category.

=== Performance Category ===
==== Acting Category ====
Best Actor	Best Actress
Sivakumar Palakrishnan - Veethi Varai; Arvind Nai - Nijangal Sr 3; T.Nakulan -Nasi Briyani; Vighnesh Nagarajan - Vanjam; Vishnu M. Anandh - Riya	Udaya Soundari - Veethi Varai; Bharathi Rani Arunachalam - Nijangal Sr 3; Eswari Gunasager - Vetri; Gayatri Segaran - Nijangal Sr 3; Nithya Rao- Nallathor Veenai
Best Supporting Actor	Best Supporting Actress
Siva Kuma - Nasi Briyani; Morganavel Selvarajoo - Nasi Briyani; V.Mohan - Nallathor Veenai; Vishnu M. Anandh - Veethi Varai; Yugendran Vasudevan Nair- Veethi Varai	Yasini Murugayah - Vanjam; Anitha Ramasamy - Vanjam; Kalaiyarasi - Nijangal Sr 3; Kokila Gobinathan - Veethi Varai; Prasakthi Allagoo - Nallathor Veenai
Best Actor/Actress in Comedy Role	Best Actor/Actress in Villain//Negative Role
Soundrarajan Jeeva - My Very Dear Kudumbam; Shitira Thevi - Kamini Cool; Maahes Chandiras - My Very Dear Kudumbam; Sathais Kumar - Khaadal Channel; Vadivazhagan - Thiruvalluvan	V. Mohan - Veethi Varai; Harikrishnan Pragalathan - Nijangal Sr 3; Kathiravan Kandevelu - Kaaviya; Shafinah Banu - Vetri; Sharon Sangeetha - Vanjam
Best Newcomer	Shining Star Award (Best Child Actor/Actress)
Dhivyah Raveen - Nijangal Sr 3; Al-Nisa Sultan - Nijangal Sr 3; Hamsapriya Rao - Kaaviya; Morganavel Selvarajoo - Riya; Vaisnavi Chelvan- Nila Suriyan	Srihari Rangan - Mat YoYo; Jai Durga - Kamini Cool; Lekshana Lakshmi - Nallathor Veenai; Sanchala- Mat YoYo; Thivyashalini Ramkumar - Mat YoYo

==== Hosting Category ====
Best Host - Variety	Best Host - Info ed
Saravanan Ayyavoo - Amarkala Deepavali 2014; Anandha Kannan - Superstar Challenge 2013; Jaynesh Isuran -Dance Jodi; Udaya Soundari- Amarkala Deepavali 2014; Vimala Velu - Jaamai	Udaya Soundari - Rayil Sneham; Hayma Malini - Jeichikaatu 10k; Jaynesh Isuran - Friends Season 2; Puravalan Narayanasamy - Ulagam Suttrum Kalaignam; Saravanan Ayyavoo- Anbudan

=== Programme Category ===
Awards	Winner	Production House
Best Drama Series	Veethi Varai	MediaCorp Eaglevission
Best Info Ed/ Docu-drama	Paadangal	MediaCorp Eaglevision
Best Infotainment	Rayil Sneham	Silver Screen International
Best Variety Series	Dance Jodi Sr 2	MediaCorp Eaglevission

=== Technical Category ===
Awards	Winner	Production House
Best Editing (Other Genres)	Dum Dum Dhumeel Sr 2	Tantra Inc.
Best Editing (Drama)	Ninjangal Sr3	MediaCorp Eaglevision
Best Videography (Other Genres)	Kalaimangal	Verite Productions
Best Videography (Drama)	Veethi Varai	MediaCorp Eaglevission
Best Direction (Other Genres)	NC16	TheMedia
Best Direction (Drama))	Kaaviya	MediaCorp Eaglevision

=== Favorite awards ===
Most Popular Female Personality	Most Popular Male Personality
Udaya Soundari; Bharathi Rani Arunachalam; Dhivyah Raveen; Eswari Gunasager; Gayatri Segaran; Indra Chandran; Leena Subramanium; Nithya Rao; Shafinah Banu; Vikneswary Se	Jaynesh; Anandha Kannan- '; Arvind Naidu; Gunalan Morgan; Saravanan Ayyavoo; Shabir Tabare Alam; Varmen Chandra Mohan; Vighnesh Nagarajan; Vignes Vadarajan; Vishnu M. Anandh
Most Popular Programme	Most Popular Most Popular Drama Song
Vanjam - Live Action (Production House)	En Kannil'' - Nijangal sr3; Jaane Jaane - Nijangal sr3; Kangalil Piranthu -KA; Kodi Parrakathu- Vetri; LOL Solathey - Kaaviya
