= Chennai 2 Singapore (soundtrack) =

Soundtrack album by Ghibran
- Released: 11 September 2016
- Recorded: 2015–2016
- Genre: Feature film soundtrack
- Length: 55:23
- Language: Tamil
- Label: Think Music India
- Producer: Ghibran

Ghibran chronology
Hyper (2016)	Chennai 2 Singapore (2016)	Adhe Kangal (2016)

Chennai 2 Singapore is the soundtrack album for the 2017 Tamil film of the same name directed by Abbas Akbar. The soundtrack and score for the film is composed by Ghibran who planned to release the film's audio in six countries via road travel, which is something unique for a South Indian film. The album featuring six tracks were released one by one so as to cover all six countries through this drive.

The promotional audio drive began on 12 August 2016 and ended on 11 September 2016, in which the team started its drive from Chennai and travelled to Bhutan, Myanmar, Thailand, Malaysia and the drive ended in Singapore. The album also released in streaming platforms, on the last day of the drive. The songs opened with mixed reviews from critics but was well received by audience for its "city based numbers" in the music album. The first song "Vaadi Vaadi" opened with positive response from audiences and eventually topped the charts in all radio stations and music streaming services.

== Background ==
"While there are three romantic numbers, the other three will be experimental. I feel they will appeal to the youth. Everyone has a crazy, whacky side that they don't reveal — this film gave me a chance to express that side of me, musically."

— Ghibran on the Chennai 2 Singapore album

Ghibran was involved in the project owing to his friendship with Akbar during his times at Singapore. The composer worked on six tracks for the film in October 2015 and recording of the songs began in December 2015. The album also featured new lyricists and playback singers working on the film's soundtrack. Think Music purchased the film's audio rights in the same month.

Since the film consisted of newcomers in the lead, Ghibran decided to plan for a unique marketing strategy for the release, considering how Kamal Haasan released the album of Uttama Villain—which Ghibran had composed for—through an online application. During his free time, he searched through Google Maps for checking the destination from Chennai to Singapore, the navigation also had options to travel via road. Ghibran then discussed with Akbar regarding plans for a road trip, while also making it as an opportunity for a unique music release.

In January 2016, Ghibran announced that all the six tracks in the album, will be released in six countries connecting India and Singapore; each track will be released one by one so that the team would cover all the countries. The initial plan of the tour is to begin with Chennai and then cross through Bhutan, Myanmar, Thailand and Malaysia, thereby completing the destination with Singapore, and wanted to complete the trip within 20 days. Engaging his fans and friends through his social media pages, Ghibran asked for advice about the road trip. He also sent a wish for Ajith Kumar known for his road skills to offer his advice.

== Marketing and release ==
The audio drive flag-off event began on 12 August 2016—coinciding the composer's birthday—at Sathyam Cinemas in Chennai. The first song "Vaadi Vaadi" was released on the same day when the event started. Ghibran described it as a "formula dream song in the Western genre", which is said to be a "relaxed" and "feel good song".

Ghibran along with the film's director Abbas Akbar, cinematographer Karthik Nallamuthu, Shiv Keshav who was the media manager in charge of social-media updates about the trip, and the composer's assistant Aravind were part of the audio drive. During the drive, Ghibran also worked in other projects so he made a mini recording studio set-up in his Ford Endeavour along with battery backup. Starting with Chennai, the team drove to Vijayawada, Kolkata, Guwahati, Assam, Nagaland and then to Manipur, from there the team proceeded to Bhutan, Myanmar, Thailand, Malaysia and Singapore. The second song "Poda" was released in Bhutan on 19 August, which was a tongue twisting rap number; it was sung by actor RJ Balaji, in his maiden attempt in playback singing.

The team further faced challenges during the road trip with natural calamities and last minute document cancellations. As the team reached Myanmar during 2 September, an earthquake of 7.4 magnitude had occurred causing Ghibran to cancel the trip midway, but they eventually proceeded the release following the support of his technical team. The third song "Pogadhe" which is said to be a "melancholic number" by Ghibran was released on the same date. The fourth song "Texas Pogiren" which was described as a "whacky number" was released on 7 September in Thailand, and the fourth song "Gun Inbam" was released in Malaysia on 10 September.

The following day, as the trip was about to be completed, all the songs were leaked online through social media platforms. Ghibran released a heartfelt note describing the challenges they faced during the trip and also being overwhelmed by the reception of the songs. But also being upset about the leak, he expressed the fans not to download the songs from piracy sites. The sixth song "Ro Ro Roshini" was released in Singapore on 11 September. To accommodate the success of the audio drive, the female version of "Pogadhe" was also unveiled on the same date as Singapore, along with the complete album.

== Track listing ==
No.	Title	Lyrics	Singer(s)	Length
1.	"Vaadi Vaadi"	Soundararajan K	Rajan Chelliah	3:50
2.	"Poda"	Sikkander, Anbumani	RJ Balaji, Abishek Raja	3:01
3.	"Pogadhe" (Male)	Jaya Rathakrishnan	Rajan Chelliah	4:21
4.	"Texas Pogiraen"	Narrow Smith, Sarva Kannan	Narrow Smith, Sharanya Gopinath	4:00
5.	"Gun Inbam"	Sikkander, Jil Sri	Sharanya Gopinath, Abbas Akbar, Emcee Jesz	3:27
6.	"Ro Ro Roshini"	Karthik Netha, Ghibran	Nivas	4:40
7.	"Pogadhe" (female)	Jaya Rathakrishnan	Suthashini	4:27
8.	"Vaadi Vaadi" (karaoke)	–	Ghibran	3:46
9.	"Poda" (karaoke)	–	Ghibran	2:58
10.	"Pogadhe" (male, karaoke)	–	Ghibran	4:19
11.	"Texas Pogiraen" (Karaoke)	–	Ghibran	4:01
12.	"Gun Inbam – Karaoke Version"	–	Ghibran	3:25
13.	"Ro Ro Roshini – Karaoke Version"	–	Ghibran	4:40
14.	"Pogadhe" (female, karaoke)	–	Ghibran	4:23
Total length:				55:23

== Reception ==
The unique promotional strategy garnered immense hype and publicity for the film with celebrities such as Rajinikanth, Kamal Haasan and Vijay Sethupathi praising Ghibran's initiative for the unique music launch.

=== Critical response ===
Reviewing for the film's soundtrack, Karthik Srinivasan of Milliblog further added "Chennai 2 Singapore's hyper-inventive soundtrack is Ghibran's mic drop moment". Anupama Subramanian of Deccan Chronicle wrote "The best thing about the movie is the unconventional and zappy music by Ghibran, who is also the co-producer of the movie." Gopinath Rajendran of The New Indian Express wrote "Gibran, who has also produced this film, has done a better job with the background score than with the songs. The best song in the album, Vaadi vaadi is picturised well, giving it a video music album feel."

Ashameera Aiyappan of The Indian Express wrote "the main pillar for the film is Ghibran's music. The man is on a roll with Aramm, Theeran Adhigaram Ondru, Maayavan and now, Chennai 2 Singapore. The album is already a hit. The background constantly keeps adding the fun element to the narrative [...] The music is vibrant, fresh and light-hearted, making the overall experience much better." Critic based at Sify wrote "For the first time this year (Magalir Mattum, Theeran Adhigaaram Ondru, Maayavan, Aramm and now, Chennai 2 Singapore), Ghibran has scored sixer in both songs and background score, it's been a dream year for him. Songs are all shot extremely well in 'music video' style." Udhav Naig of The Hindu stated "composer Ghibran's tunes should be enough to make you sit through this film, which, in hindsight, could have been a much better slapstick attempt."

== Other versions ==
Ghibran performed a concert version of the song "Vaadi Vaadi" which was released on 21 May 2020, during the nationwide lockdown due to COVID-19 pandemic.
