= Jaya Rathakrishnan =

Singaporean screenwriter, lyricist and film director

- Born: 10 March 1981 (age 45)
- Education: Queensland University of Technology, Brisbane, Australia Nanyang Technological University, Singapore
- Occupations: Screenwriter, Lyricist, Director
- Years active: 2001-Present

Jaya Rathakrishnan (born 10 March 1981) is a Singaporean screenwriter, lyricist and film director. Rathakrishnan started working as a screenwriter in 2001. She started working as creative director for Stardust Story. Since then she has written award-winning Tamil television dramas such as Vettai (Pledged to Hunt) and Vyjayanthi under Vasantham, a Singaporean free-to-air television channel that is owned by Mediacorp. Most recently Janani D/O Madhavan Season 2, bagged her the “Best Children Series” Award in Pradhana Vizha 2018.

== Education ==
Rathakrishnan completed her degree at Queensland University of Technology, Brisbane (2006) Bachelor of Fine Arts in Film & Television and her masters at Nanyang Technological University, Singapore (2010) Master in Mass Communication.

== Career ==
Rathakrishnan started off as an assistant producer and started specialising in writing and producing with Eaglevision, Mediacorp since 2001. She has since written several screenplays for award-winning television dramas, variety shows and Info-educational shows.

Rathakrishnan has also penned several songs which has become a breakthrough in local compositions and YouTube sensations – Oru Murai, Kangal Rendil, Ketta Pillai, and Vidiyalai Kaanavillai. She has also penned a song under Kollywood composer Ghibran's music for a Tamil movie.

In 2017, Rathakrishnan founded Stardust Story, a media firm, and is currently in partnership with theatre director Beatrice Chia-Richmond. Since then, Jaya has written for several popular drama series under Stardust Story including the screenplay for Michael Chiang's Mixed Signals, After Love and Thilaanaa. Both the series, Mixed Signals and Thilaanaa were screened at the Singapore Media Festival 2019.

Rathakrishnan also continues to collaborate with other content creators as a head writer and screenwriter. She wrote the screenplay and dialogues for an episode of HBO Asia's Food Lore series - A Plate of Moon.

== Screenwriting ==
In 2010, Rathakrishnan became the scriptwriter for Vettai, a popular Singapore Tamil language police procedural drama television series by Mediacorp Vasantham which continued on for 4 seasons. At the 2011 Pradhana Vizha awards, the series also snatched the award for "Most Popular Series".

In 2011, Rathakrishnan continued scriptwriting for Nijangal, a Singapore Tamil language family drama television series on Mediacorp Vasantham which continued on for 3 seasons and won “Most Popular Programme” and “Best Drama” for Nijangal S2 in the 2012 Pradhana Vizha.

In 2014, Rathakrishnan wrote Janani d/o Madhavan that continued for 2 seasons and snagged the Pradhana Vizha for “Best Child” for season 1 in 2016 and the Pradhana Vizha for “Best Child” for Janani d/o Madhavan season 2 in 2018.

In 2017, Rathakrishnan took on the role of the executive producer and head writer of BRA, a 13 part series about breast cancer which aired on Channel 5, Mediacorp Singapore.

In 2018, she wrote the screenplay for Kalaba Kadhala which became one of the most widely watched TV shows on meWATCH, a Singaporean digital video on demand service brand owned by Mediacorp.

In 2018, she penned the lyrics for “Get Your Freaking Hands Of Me” released by music director Ghibran, who worked together with Rathakrishnan on the movie Chennai to Singapore. This was launched by well known Indian actor/director, Kamal Haasan under the MeToo Movement at the Jeppiaar Engineering College.

In 2019, Rathakrishnan scripted for HBO's Food Lore series for the episode, A Plate of Moon directed by Don Aravind. The episode, shot in both India and Singapore, depicts how the power of a favourite dish is able to bring joy to an alzheimer-stricken old man as it allows him to reminisce about his youthful days. The HBO episode, A Plate of Moon was also screened at the Singapore Media Festival 2019.

In 2021, Rathakrishnan and K. Rajagopal won the national prize for the 2021 Asian Academy Creative Awards in Best Direction (Fiction) for the drama, Parambarai.

== Awards ==
Year	Show	Awards for
2005	Pradhana Vizha	Most Popular Programme for Vasantham Star 2005
2011	Pradhana Vizha	“Best Drama” for :Vyjayanthi
2011	Pradhana Vizha	“Most Popular Programme” for Vettai S1
2012	Pradhana Vizha	“Most Popular Programme” and “Best Drama” for Nijangal S2
2014	Pradhana Vizha	“Best Song” for En Kannil Unnai Kanden
2015	Asian Television Awards “Commendable award for Best Opening Song” for Kshatriyan	
2015	Association of Singapore Tamil Writers Kannadasan Award	
2016	Pradhana Vizha	“Best Child” for Janani d/o Madhavan S1
2018	Pradhana Vizha	“Best Child” for Janani d/o Madhavan S2
