= Udaya (name) =

Udaya is a name common in South Asia. Notable people with this name include:

== Given name ==
- Udaya Bhanu (actress) (born 1972), Indian actress
- Udaya Bohara, Nepali politician
- Udaya Chandrika, Indian actress
- Udaya Dharmawardhana, Sri Lankan film director
- Udaya Gammanpila (born 1970), Sri Lankan politician
- Udaya Kumar, multiple individuals:
  - Udaya Kumar (academic), Indian literary critics
  - Udaya Kumar Dharmalingam (born 1978), Indian designer
  - Udaya Kumar (director) (born 1986), Indian film director
- Udaya Nanayakkara, Sri Lankan major general
- Udaya Tara Nayar (born 1947), Indian film critics
- Udaya Shumsher Rana (born 1970), Nepali politician
- Udaya Ranawaka, Sri Lankan medical doctor
- Udaya Soundari (born 1988), Singaporean actress
- Udaya Wickramasinghe (1939–2010), Sri Lankan cricket umpire

== Surname ==
- K. M. Udaya (born 1975), Indian politician

== Royalty ==
- Udaya I, King of Anuradhapura from 901 to 912
- Udaya II, King of Anuradhapura from 952 to 955
- Udaya III, King of Anuradhapura from 964 to 972

== See also ==
- Uday
