= Jaynesh Isuran =

Singaporean Tamil actor and radio jockey

Jaya Ganesh Isuran
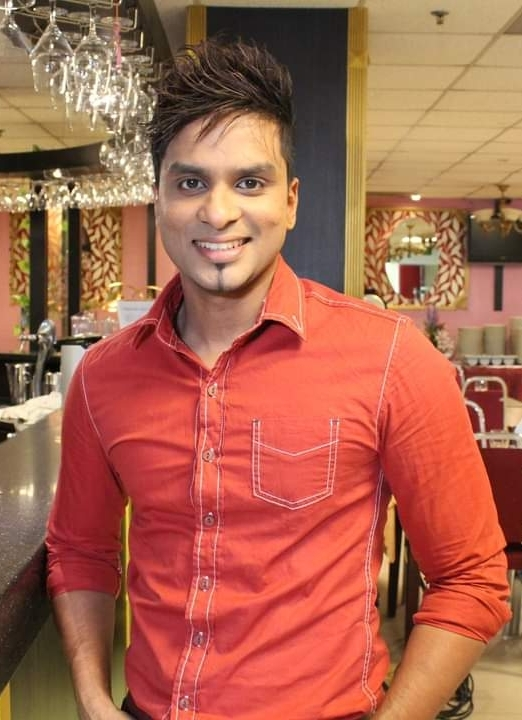
- Jaynesh in 2012
- Born: Jaya Ganesh Isuran; 3 July 1988 (age 38); Singapore
- Other name: Jay Nesh
- Occupations: Actor, radio jockey, anchor, rapper, dancer
- Years active: 1997–present

Jaya Ganesh Isuran (born 3 July 1988) also known as Jaynesh, is a Singaporean Tamil television actor, radio jockey and television host. He was well known for his unique hosting in Hello V Live on Vannathirai, Hello Vasantham and acting as one of the main role as a police officer of Secret Society Branch ASP Raghav in the crime drama Vettai Season 2. He was a former radio jockey in the Singaporean Tamil radio station Oli 96.8FM.

== Personal life ==
Jaynesh was born to a former Vasantham stage singer and actor K. Isuran and mother V. Santhravathana.

Jaynesh married Regina Raja in 2009 after being in a relationship since 1999. The couple has two sons. Jaynesh now acts in international movies.

== Filmography ==
Year	Title	Role	Notes
2023	Broken Script	Amaran	

=== Television ===
Year	Program	Role	Notes	Ref
2012	Vettai (season 2)	ASP Raghav		
2013	Vetri (season 1)	Vetri		
2014	Hello Vasantham	Host		
2015	Vetri (season 2)	Vetri		
2015	Kudumbam United			
2016	Vetri (season 3)	Vetri		
2016	Kalyanam	Paarthi		
2016	Takkaru Deepavali	Host		
2017	Alaipayuthey		Main cast	
2017	Saravedi Deepavali	Host		
2017	Janani D/O Madhavan (season 2)	Santhosh Subramaniam		
2017	Thalli Pogathey	Samar		
2018	Bimbangal		Main cast	
2019	Singa Airlines	Vishwa		
2020–2021	Kavasam	Karthik Siddharth		
2021	Deepavali Countdown 2021	Host		
2023–present	1943: Kappaleriya Thamizhan	Karmegam Kannan		

== Awards and nominations ==
Year	Award	Category	Work	Result	Ref
2014	Pradhana Vizha	Most Popular Male Personality	—N/a	Won	
2016	Pradhana Vizha	Most Popular Male Personality	—N/a	Won	
2016	Pradhana Vizha	People's Choice Awards	—N/a	Won	
2021	Pradhana Vizha	Most Popular Male Artist	—N/a	Won	
