= Udaya =

Udaya may refer to:

- Udaya (name), a name common in South Asia
- Udaya Pictures, a film production company in Kerala, India
- Udaya TV, a Kannada-language television channel in India
- Udayin or Udayabhadra, king of Magadha in ancient India (r. 460 BC – 444 BC)
- Udaya Manikya, a 16th-century king of Tripura Kingdom in India
- Oudaya, a Moroccan tribe of Arab origin

== See also ==
- Udayam (disambiguation)
- Udayar (disambiguation)
- Uday, an Indian male given name
