= Alaipayuthey (TV series) =

Indian Tamil-language soap opera

- Genre: Soap opera
- Written by: Haider Ali
- Screenplay by: Haider Ali; MD. Amin BMD Ali; Dialogue; MD. Amin BMD Ali
- Directed by: Haider Ali; Assistant director Ganesh Murusamy
- Starring: A. Panneeirchelvam; Puravalan Narayanasamy; Jenani; Jaynesh; Magalakshmi; Brendon Kuah; Rubini; Vimala Velu
- Theme music composer: Shabir
- Country of origin: Singapore
- Original language: Tamil
- No. of episodes: 43

Production
- Producer: Menaka Krishnasamy
- Editors: G. Saravanan; Sri Venkatragavan
- Camera setup: Multi-camera
- Running time: approx. 22–24 minutes per episode

Original release
- Network: MediaCorp Vasantham
- Release: 16 January – 30 March 2017

Alaipayuthey (transl. Waves are flowing) is a 2017 Singaporean Tamil-language soap opera starring A. Panneeirchelvam, Puravalan Narayanasamy, Jenani, Jayaganesh, Magalakshmi Sudarsanan, Brendon Kuah, Rubini and Vimala Velu. It aired every Monday through Thursday at 10:30PM (SST) on MediaCorp Vasantham from 16 January 2017 to 30 March 2017 for 43 episodes. It replaced Masala. The show's final one-hour episode aired Thursday 30 March 2017 at 10:00 PM SST.

== Synopsis ==
The story revolves around Ratnam, his wife Malar and his three children, Haresh, Hashwini and Akshara, each having their own struggles in their life journey. Problems arise when Malar disapproves of Hashwini's boyfriend, Brandon due to his race. Knowing that the tension will soon potentially divide the family, Haresh agrees to marrying Kamini, his cousin. Meanwhile, Hashwini gets married without her mother's presence. Then, Ratnam meets his ex-girlfriend whom his father had rejected when he was younger. He finds out that she's working as a counselor in Askhara's university, and starts talking to her. Akshara too faces problems in university with her friends Prem, Kavin and Shwetha. She also finds out she has had brain tumor for some time already. Furthermore, Haresh falls in love with another girl, Shalini, and is stuck between Kamini and her. How all the characters deal with their own problems as a family, fight for their loves and learn lessons in the journey of life forms the rest of the plot for the story.

== Cast ==
=== Main cast ===
- A. Panneeirchelvam
- Puravalan Narayanasamy
- Jaenani Netra
- Jaynesh
- Magalakshmi Sudarsanan
- Brendon Kuah
- Rupini Anbalagan
- Vimala Velu

=== Supporting cast ===
- Laavenya
- Shawn Sathiya
- Dhurga
- Poovani
- Mohamed Anis
- Santhi
- Stephen Zecharaiah
- Saravanan
- Kartik
- Parathabini
- k. Dayanithi
- S. Mogene Priya
- Michale
- Andrew Thio
- Sharon Tan

== Production ==
The drama was written and directed by Haider Ali, Assistant director by Ganesh Murusamy, screenplay by Haider Ali and MD. Amin BMD Ali, Dialogue by MD. Amin BMD Ali and producer by Menaka Krishnasamy.

== Original soundtrack ==
=== Title song ===
It was written by lyricist Parthiban and Seetharaman, composed Shabir sung by Rita Thyagarajan and Shabir.

=== Soundtrack ===
Track list
No.	Title	Lyrics	Music	Singer(s)	Length
1.	"Paravai Podum Osai Thane (பறவை போடும் ஓசை தானே) Title Song"	Parthiban, Seetharaman	Shabir	Rita Thyagarajan, Shabir
2.	"Thula Thattil (துலா தட்டில்)"	Oviya	Satthia	Deepak	1:28

== Broadcast ==
Series was released on 16 January 2017, on Mediacorp Vasantham. It aired in Singapore and Malaysia on Mediacorp Vasantham, its full-length episodes and released its episodes on their app Toggle, a live TV feature was introduced on Toggle with English and Tamil subtitles.
