= Odai =

Odai may refer to:

- Ōdai, Mie
- Odăi
- Uday
