= Nisha Kumar =

Malaysian actress and television presenter

- Nisha Kumar in 2026
- Born: Klang, Selangor, Malaysia
- Occupations: Actress; model; television presenter
- Years active: 2015–present
- Title: Miss Malaysia Pan Continental 2015

Nisha Kumar is a Malaysian actress, model and television presenter based in Singapore, known for her work in Tamil-language television dramas on Mediacorp Vasantham. She entered the media industry through beauty pageants, becoming one of the seventeen finalists of Miss Universe Malaysia 2015 and was placed in the Top 10 at the final, before being named Miss Malaysia Pan Continental the same year.

Nisha made her acting debut in the Vasantham drama Ragasiyam (2015) and has since appeared in more than twenty Tamil-language television productions. She won Best Supporting Actress at the Pradhana Vizha awards in 2024, and in 2026 received the publicly voted Most Popular Female Star award at the same ceremony.

== Early life and education ==
Nisha is from Klang in Selangor, Malaysia. She is the eldest of three siblings. Her father, Dato' Santhira Kumar, is a businessman, and her mother is Indra Perumal. Her paternal grandparents came from Karaikudi in Tamil Nadu, India, and she is of Malaysian Indian descent.

She completed her secondary education at SMK Convent Klang, studied A-Levels at HELP University, and went on to study physiotherapy at MAHSA University. She is fluent in Tamil, English and Malay.

== Career ==
=== Pageantry and modelling (2014–2015) ===
Nisha first attracted media attention in Malaysia in 2014 as an aspiring model, telling The Star that appearing in magazines had been a long-held ambition.

In November 2014 she was named, at the age of 24, as one of the seventeen finalists of The Next Miss Universe Malaysia 2015, selected by the Miss Universe Malaysia Organisation after a six-month search in Kuala Lumpur and Kota Kinabalu. She was 25 by the time of the four-week training programme preceding the finale, which was held on 17 April 2015 at the Shangri-La Kuala Lumpur, and was then working as an accounts executive. She was placed in the Top 10 at the final. She was later named Miss Malaysia Pan Continental 2015.

=== Television (2015–present) ===
Nisha began her television career with Mediacorp Vasantham in Singapore in 2015, making her acting debut in the drama Ragasiyam. She played the lead role of Shakti in the 2017 series Yaathumaagi. She went on to appear in a series of Vasantham dramas in lead and principal roles, and, being fluent in Tamil, Malay and English, also appeared in productions for Mediacorp Suria and Channel 5.

Alongside acting, Nisha has worked as a television presenter, hosting the fifth season of the Vasantham programme Udhayam.

=== Film ===
In 2025, Nisha was announced in a principal role as Manju, an Indian police officer, in a feature film produced by the Singaporean producer Devarajan and shot in India, planned for release in Singapore, India and Malaysia. She described it as her first time playing a police officer.

== Personal life ==
Nisha was born and raised in Malaysia and later relocated to Singapore to pursue her acting career.

On 30 March 2020 she married Sathyamoorthi Naidu, a Singaporean actor and television drama assistant director, at the Sri Vairavimada Kaliamman Temple in Singapore. Because COVID-19 restrictions limited attendance to ten people, the ceremony was streamed live and watched by about 2,400 people, including her parents and relatives in Selangor, who were unable to travel to Singapore.

== Filmography ==
=== Television ===
| Year | Title | Role | Notes |
|---|---|---|---|
| 2015 | Ragasiyam (season 2) | Amala | Supporting role |
| 2017 | Thallipogathey | Deeksha | Supporting role |
| 2017 | Athiyaayam | Pooja | Supporting role |
| 2017 | Yaathumaagi | Shakti | Lead role |
| 2018 | Vettai 4 | Jothi | Supporting role |
| 2019 | Singa Airlines | Charms / Chamundeshwary | Main cast |
| 2019 | Uyire | Priyanka | Main cast |
| 2019 | Avathaaram | Shalini | Supporting role |
| 2019 | Kanne Kaniamuthe | Lavanya | Main cast |
| 2020 | Mitara | Tara | Lead role |
| 2021 | Kavasam | Dr. Deepti | Main cast |
| 2022 | Kanmani | Madhu | Lead role |
| 2022 | Kanne Kaniamuthe (season 2) | Lavanya | Main cast |
| 2022 | Maiyam | Neha | Main cast |
| 2022 | Amartyan | Anu / Queen Indhumathi | Double role |
| 2023 | Yaar 4 | Vedhika | Main cast |
| 2023 | Vinaivazhi | Brindha | Supporting role |
| 2023 | Thiruvaai Malarvaai 2 | Mandakini | Main cast |
| 2023 | Jambulingam | Varsha | Main cast |
| 2024 | Pithamagan | Sneha | Main cast |
| 2024 | Kavalan | Usha | Main cast |
| 2024 | Karuvanam | Jasmin | Special appearance |
| 2024 | Ayyaveedu | Rukmini | Main cast |
| 2025 | Sandamarutham | Madhuvadhani | Lead role |
| 2025 | Konjam Uppu Konjam Kaaram | Meera | Lead role |
| 2025 | Udhayam (season 5) | Host | Television presenter |
| 2026 | Kannae Kaniamuthe (season 3) | Lavanya | Main cast |
| 2026 | Mr & Master Cook | Anchor | Cooking show on Star Vijay |

== Awards and nominations ==
| Year | Award | Category | Result | Ref |
|---|---|---|---|---|
| 2024 | Pradhana Vizha | Best Supporting Actress | Won | |
| 2026 | Pradhana Vizha | Most Popular Female Star | Won | |
