= Vettai (TV series) =

- Genre: Crime, Drama
- Created by: Anuratha Kanderaju and Abbas Akbar (Season 1&2); Anuratha Kanderaju & Kumaran Sundaram & Don Arvind (Season Three); Kumaran Sundaram & SS Vikneshwaran (Season Four)
- Written by: Jaya Rathakrishnan
- Theme music composer: Shabir
- Country of origin: Singapore
- Original language: Tamil
- No. of seasons: 4

Production
- Executive producer: Prema Pon Rajoo
- Producers: Larvn Raveen; Pavitra Chandrakumar; Ganesh Ramalingam
- Running time: 30 minutes
- Production company: MediaCorp EagleVission

Original release
- Network: Vasantham
- Release: November 2010 – March 2018

Vettai is Singapore Tamil language police procedural drama television series created by Anuratha Kanderaju and Abbas Akbar for MediaCorp Vasantham. The series' first season was on-air from 23 November 2010 to 30 March 2011, every Monday to Thursday, 10.30 pm and the second season was on-air from 4 January 2012 to 11 May 2013. Meanwhile, the third season started to air on Deepavali 2014 and end by Spring 2015 and the fourth season started to air from 11 December 2017 to 29 March 2018, every Monday to Thursday at 10.00 pm.

This long-form drama series was directed by Anuratha Kanderaju and Abbas Akbar. Meanwhile, the third season were directed by Anuratha Kanderaju, Kumaran Sundaram and Don Arvind. And the 4th Season was directed by Kumaran Sundaram and SS Vikneshwaran. The series is one of the most watched television series in Singapore.

== Series overview ==
The base of the drama is set in a fictionalized police unit that specializes in unravelling unsolved cases which are often referred to as cold cases.

They are part of a special task force assembled just to tackle cold cases pertaining to the Indian community and Indian immigrants. The unit is not widely publicized and kept under wraps but their work is consuming to say the least.

=== Seasons overview ===
Season	Episodes	Originally aired (Singapore dates)	
Season	Episodes	First aired	Last aired
1	72	18 November 2010	14 March 2011
2	72	7 January 2012	14 May 2012
3	72	Deepavali 2014	Summer 2015
4	62	11 December 2017	29 March 2018

== Seasons ==
=== Season 1 ===
The first season known as Vettai : Pledged to Hunt ran for 72 episodes. Due to its high degree of popularity and TV ratings, the final 3 episodes of the season were shown on Cathay, Orchard Cineleisure, at 7 pm.

=== Season 2 ===
Following the positive reception of the first season, a second season, titled Vettai 2.0: The Next Generation was produced. The first episode aired on 4 January 2012, with a special behind-the-scenes episode airing the day before. The second season aired in the same time slot as its predecessor: 10:30 pm to 11 pm from Monday to Thursday on Vasantham.

==== Cast ====
- Gunalan Morgan as Mugi
- Arvind Naidu as Shan
- Vignesh Wadarajan as Seelan
- Eswari Gunasagar as Meera
- Jaynesh as Raghav

=== Season 3 ===
Due to the popularity of the first two seasons a third season titled Vettai 3: The Final Judgment started to air on Deepavali in 2014. The series was on every weekend at 10.30 pm. The 3rd season was directed by Anuratha Kanderaju, Kumaran Sundaram and Don Arvind.

==== Cast ====
- Arvind Naidu as Shan
- Eswari Gunasagar as Meera
- Gunalan Morgan as Mugi
- Roxanne Sylvia as Diana
- Saravanan Ayyavoo as Shiva
- Vignesh Wadarajan as Seelan
- Raghadeepan Santheran as Sakthi
- Nithiya Rao as Maha

=== Season 4 ===
A fourth season titled Vettai 4: The Force started to air on 11 December 2017, with a special behind-the-scenes episode airing on 7 December 2017. The series was on every weekend at 10 pm. The 4th season was directed by Kumaran Sundaram and SS Vikneshwaran.

==== Cast ====
- Puravalan as DSP Pradeep
- Vignesh Wadarajan as DSP Seelan
- Thavanesan as INSP Dhayal
- Seshan as INSP Suhas
- Magalakshmi as INSP Maya
- Malene Waters as INSP Swathi
- Eswari Gunasagar as Meera (Cameo)
- Gunalan Morgan as Mugi (Cameo)

== Cast and characters ==
Actor	Character	Seasons	
Actor	Character	Seasoan 1(Vettai : Pledged to Hunt)	Season 3 (The Final Judgement)
Arvind Naidu	Shan	Main	Main
Eswari Gunasagar	Meera	TBA	Main
Gunalan Morgan	Mugi	Main	Main
Roxanne Sylvia	Diana	TBA	Main
Saravanan Ayyavoo	Shiva	Guest	Main
Vignesh Wadarajan	Seelan	Main	Main
Shabir	Nantha	Main	TBA
Gayathri Segaran	Radha	Main	TBA

== Awards ==
At the 2011 Pradhana Vizha awards, the series won "Most Popular Series", while Shabir won "Best Actor", Gunalan won "Most Popular Male Personality" and Gayathiri won "Most Popular Female Personality".
