= Udayam =

Udayam may refer to:

- Udayam (newspaper), a Telugu-language daily newspaper
- Udayam (film), a 1973 Indian Malayalam-language film
- Udayam (TV series), a 2017–2020 Singaporean reality series

== See also ==
- Udaya (disambiguation)
