= Nijangal =

- Title screen for Season 3
- Genre: Family drama
- Created by: Rajarethinam Tamilmaran and Abbas Akbar
- Written by: Jaya Rathakrishnan
- Starring: Arvind Naidu; Soundarajan; Bharathi Rani; Varman; Nishmen Nair; Sharon Sangeetha; Bachan Kaur; Shyamala; Kaushik; Nithya Rao; Ruban; Jitenram; Karthikeyan Somasundaram; Gayathri Segaran; Divya Raveen; Harikrishnan Pragalathan
- Opening theme: "Ithu Nijangal" by Chandramohan (Season 1) "Nijangal Pothumae" by Shabir (Season 2) "Nijangal Enge" by Vicknesh Saravanan (Season 3)
- Country of origin: Singapore
- Original language: Tamil
- No. of seasons: 3
- No. of episodes: 216

Production
- Production location: Singapore
- Running time: 24 minutes

Original release
- Network: MediaCorp Vasantham
- Release: 21 November 2011 – 21 April 2014

Nijangal (English: Truths) is a 216-part Singaporean Tamil drama, on MediaCorp Vasantham. The series was on air from 21 November 2011 to 21 April 2014.

== Characters ==
- Akhil
- Raj & Devi
- Hari & Yamuna
- Madhu

== Awards and nominations ==
Pradhana Vizha 2014

- Best Actor - Arvind Naidu
- Best Actress - Bharathi Rani Arunachalam and Gayathri Segaran
- Best Drama - Nijangal Series 3

Pradhana Vizha

- Best Child Artiste - Sanchala - won
