= Abbas Akbar =

Singaporean filmmaker

- Akbar (in striped shirt) in 2010
- Citizenship: Singaporean
- Occupation: Filmmaker
- Years active: 2009 – present

Abbas Akbar is a Singaporean filmmaker, screenwriter, and executive producer. He has written, directed, and overseen over 100 hours of television and film since 2009.

He is known for Mediacorp's drama series (Tamil), Vettai: Pledged to Hunt, which he wrote and directed in 2010. The show won 'Most Popular Series' at Pradhana Vizha 2011.

== Career ==
Abbas Akbar made the short film Certain Chapters (2009), which was nominated 'Best Short Film' at the Asian Festival of First Films, and was screened at several international film festivals including Kathmandu International Mountain Film Festival, 3rd New Jersey Independent South Asian Cinefest and the Stepping Stone Film Festival in Chennai.

His music videos featuring Shabir were the first independent Tamil content to be playing on MTV Asia (both broadcast & online) and other international channels.

He was one of the two directors for the award-winning and successful drama series Vettai and directed the Tamil procedural police drama, Vettai: Pledged to Hunt, which won a number of awards at Pradhana Vizha 2011.

In 2012, Abbas Akbar created his first feature film in India, Chennai 2 Singapore. The film was jointly produced by Infocomm Media Development Authority (IMDA), Vrobal, MM2 Entertainment Pte, and co-produced by Ghibran and Shabir. This film was the first collaboration between the Tamil and Singaporean film industries.

== Honors and awards ==
The Singapore Police Force in celebration of the Home Team National Day Observance Ceremony on 6 August 2012, awarded Akbar with a Public Spiritedness Award from the Minister of Prime Minister's Office and 2nd Minister for Home Affairs and Trade and Industry S. Iswaran. The award was presented for his assistance rendered to a patrol officer in stopping an offender who attempted to escape.

== Filmography ==
Year	Film	Note(s)
2009	Certain Chapters	Short documentary film; also actor
2017	Chennai 2 Singapore	Based on the book Me and Earl and the Dying Girl

=== Television ===
Year	Title	Notes
2011-2014	Nijangal	
2010-2017	Vettai 1) Vettai: Pledged to Hunt 2) Vettai 2.0	
