= KL To Karaikudi =

- Country of origin: Malaysia
- Original language: Tamil (with English subtitles)

Production
- Running time: 60 minutes with commercials
- Production company: Astro Malaysia

Original release
- Network: Astro Vinmeen HD
- Release: 31 December 2016 – 1 October 2017

KL To Karaikudi is a Malaysia Tamil language travelogue show that aired on Astro Vinmeen HD every Sunday . The show were presented and hosted by Malaysia actor Denes Kumar and Singapore tv anchor, Nisha Wong Directed by AV Ramesh. They hit the road on a travel adventure. Traversing through Malaysia, Thailand, Myanmar and India, they take on more than 7000 km on a Royal Enfield Desert Storm Classic Bike.
