= Vettai: Pledged to Hunt =

- Season 1 logo
- Directed by: Anuratha Kanderaju and Abbas Akbar
- Starring: Gunalan Morgan; Arvind Naidu; Vignesh; Shabir; Gayathri Segaran; Sathish; Indra; Gayathri Sharma; Rishi Kumaar; Elias Mikhail
- Theme music composer: Shabir
- Opening theme: "Tadak Tadak" by Shabir and Emcee Jazz
- Country of origin: Singapore
- Original language: Tamil
- No. of episodes: 72

Production
- Production location: Singapore
- Running time: 30 minutes

Original release
- Network: Vasantham
- Release: November 2010 – April 2015

Vettai : Pledged to Hunt (English: Hunt) was the first season of Singapore's Tamil, 72-part crime drama, Vettai. The series ran on-air from 23 November 2010 to 30 March 2011, every Monday to Thursday, at 10:30 pm on the MediaCorp Vasantham channel. The season was directed by Anuratha Kanderaju and Abbas Akbar.

== Plot summary ==
A special task force was assembled to tackle crime cases pertaining to the Indian community and Indian immigrants. Not widely publicized, the unit is kept under wraps.

Spearheaded by Chief Dayanidhi, the force consists of three teams and a criminologist. Together they investigate cold-blooded murders, kidnappings and sexual crimes. But as professional and personal lives collide, the force appears headed towards a perilous outcome with lives to be lost and bonds to be broken. The group's pledge to uphold justice and peace in their country will be put to the test.

== Cast ==
=== Main cast ===
- Gunalan Morgan as Mugi
- Arvind Naidu as Shan
- Vignesh Wadarajan as Seelan
- Shabir as Nantha
- Gayathri Segaran as Radha
- Sathish Rames as Prakash
- Indra Chandran as Regina
- Gayathri Sharma as Suganya
- Jivvenesh Sivan as Jivva

=== Supporting cast ===
- Rishi Kumaar as Praveen
- Elias Mikhail as Chandrabose

=== Guest cast ===
- Puravalan
- Saravanan Ayavoo
- Kishore

== Characters ==
Team 1: Nantha (Shabir) and Seelan (Vignesh) are a powerhouse duo. Well matched in intelligence and physical strength they are a force to be reckoned with. They complement each other well and intuitively recognize one another's moves to cover themselves on duty. They bear grudges against each other, however, which could wreck the entire unit. Seelan is the unit's only married man and is a proud father of a daughter. He is responsible and practical about saving money and achieving family security. Dark and handsome, he has a broody nature that foretells secrets which only he may know. Nantha, on the other hand, is single and likes her independence. Will they collide or unite to take on their enemies?

Team 2: Mugi is paired with rookie Prakash. Frequently their personalities collide and their ideologies run in parallel without meeting to compromise. Prakash is a university graduate, while Mugi is a secondary school diploma holder who signed onto the service. Prakash abides by rules and follows protocol strictly, to Mugi's great irritation. Mugi leans toward a 'do first, explain later' attitude. He has no interest in explaining procedures to Prakash, and frequently relegates Prakash to administrative tasks like buying coffee and curry puffs, photocopying, faxing and filing. Should Prakash comment on anything, Mugi attributes it to Prakash's arrogance in being a graduate. Will these partners solve a crime without killing each other first?

Team 3: Shanmugam (affectionately known as Shan) and Radha are best buddies and the most fun-loving team in the unit. Both are in love, but not with each other. They are attractive young individuals, but their friendship and camaraderie are purely platonic. Radha is secretly in love with Nantha, while Shan adores Gina, the in-house criminologist. How will their love interests play out?

== Crew ==
- Directors: Anuratha Kanderaju and Abbas Akbar
- Executive Producer: Prema Pon Rajoo
- Assistant Directors: Radha Jeevan, Vathsala Naidu Danabalan and Pavithra Chandra Kumar
- Screenplay / Dialogue: Jaya Rathakrishnan and Rajarathinam Tamilmaran
- Photography: S. Ananth and R. Asogan
- Music and Effects: L. Chandiramogan
- Sound: A. Selva Kumar and Gan
- Camera: Terence Yap and Geeshan Srimantha
- Editing: Agustin K.M., David Anil Sharma and K. Sailenran Pragash
- Stunts: Jimmy Low
- Post Production: Video Houze

== Episodic synopsis ==
Episode 1
"The Stake out in United States of America"

Chief Dayanidhi has received a tip that the drug syndicate the unit has long pursued is about to attempt dealings in various parts of the island-state. All three teams have been activated and have staked out key areas. We see them right in the heat of their operations. Do they catch the syndicate or does the entire operation get foiled?

Episode 2
"Red Light Glare"

Shan is lurking around the streets of Geylang, Singapore late one night and does not want to be seen. The next day a call-girl is found dead in the area. Shan has explaining to do to prove his innocence. Will anyone believe him? Can he even be trusted anymore?

Episode 3
"Truth Be Told"

Shan is implicated in the prostitute's murder and is being questioned by higher authorities. Shan is hiding something, but even his best buddy Radha cannot get him to talk.

Episode 4
"Who Is the Black Sheep?"

Chief Dayanidhi discovers something that will rock the entire unit to its core.

Episode 5
"Tempt Me Not!"

Shan tries to convince the Chief of his innocence. The Chief, however, refuses to consider his innocence without evidence. Undercover officers find Shan at Geylang one night. Why would he be there?

Episode 6
"Another One Bites the Dust?"

Another call girl is being preyed upon by the killer. The Chief's suspicion about Shan increases, though he continues to deny it. Meanwhile, Mugi and Prakash obtain leads on the Geylang murder. Will they be able to prove Shan's innocence? Is Shan indeed telling the truth?

Episode 7
"The Citizen Journalist"

The Chief is furious that Shalini, an online journalist, has written unfavourable comments about the unit's investigation. Shalini reveals her own investigations, which are a step ahead of the unit. Will the unit team up with Shalini to catch the killer?

Episode 8
"Mend My Heart, Gina"

Shan is ordered to attend counseling sessions with Regina, the in-house criminologist. Shan has harboured infatuation with Regina and is happy for this opportunity to get close to her. Will this work out for Shan?

Episode 9
"The Bait"

The Chief sends two of his officers, Nantha and Seelan, on a secret operation. Why? Has he a hidden motive?

Episode 10
"I Am On To You!"

The Chief's suspicions are further confirmed. What action will he take? Meanwhile, Seelan tries to mend his relationship with his wife, but to no avail. Why is Manju behaving that way?

Episode 11
"Casefile: The Missing Boy"

Shan and Radha embark on a missing boy case. The deeper they dig, the more skeletons they discover. Can they save the boy?

Episode 12
"The Fall of the Chief"

After tonight, the unit will never be the same again. Watch for revelations that will yield unexpected turns of events and power shifts.

Episode 13
"Aftermath of Foul Play"

Seelan and Nantha's enmity rises to a new level as trust is questioned and suspicions are blazing.

Episode 14
"Eulogies & Betrayals"

The unit remembers and mourns its loss, but on the other side acts of betrayal are shaking the unit's very existence.

Episode 15
"Just Admit It!"

When Nantha looks at Radha silently, he really is not as cold as he appears. But can Radha tear down the wall that Nantha has built around himself?

Episode 16
"Reunion!"

Shan and Radha get a tip about a Chinatown slavery ring. Will this lead bring them closer to solving the case?

Episode 17
"Moral Compass"

Mugi uses his influence to spend time with Shalini. Seelan is about to cross over to the dark side. Nantha catches Angel intoxicated on booze! Care to use a moral compass, anyone?

Episode 18
"Stakes Are High!"

Shalini calls Mugi with some leads about the rich elite kids and their drug suppliers. Mugi uses this opportunity to rope in Shalini for the stakeout, leaving Prakash out. Will Prakash endure this insult or will he confront Mugi and put him in his place?

Episode 19
"Who is the Bose?"

The unit has long grappled with the existence of an underground drug syndicate. Today we finally see them, or, rather, the man behind the syndicate. Bose!

Episode 20
"Accidental Hero?"

Mugi is hot on the heels of the drug syndicate but lands himself in hot water when he bites off more than he can chew. Will Prakash save the day?

Episode 21
"Angel or Devil?"

Mugi is in serious trouble and the unit must do something to save him. Meanwhile, we find out about Angel's real background.

Episode 22
"Are You Out of Your Mind?!"

A dead infant has been found, and it looks like foul play is at work. Regina concludes that the perpetrator must be someone who is mentally ill. But on the personal front, even sane individuals are sidestepping sanity's blurred line, doing things that they are not supposed to do. It is all in the mind, or rather, out of their minds?

Episode 23
"The Un'Holy' Grail"

Regina develops a deep interest in Nantha's attitude and mannerisms. She takes it upon herself to study him and to find out more about him. Will she unearth more than she bargained for?

Episode 24
"Flying High"

Shalini has gathered enough clues to cast doubt on Mugi's charge. She approaches Seelan with the list. Seelan assigns Prakash to nab the suspected kids from the elite society. The 'FLYING HIGH' operation kickstarts. Nantha and Seelan get nearer to nabbing the criminal responsible for the infant's death. Will both teams fly high or fall flat?

Episode 25
"Let truth Sting!"

It is time for painful truths to be told, seen and heard. Shan sees something he should not see. Nantha hears something he does not want to hear. Mugi must utter something he does not wish to say. Let it sting.

Episode 26
"Massacre!"

A serial killer is on the loose. Young Indian girls are being raped and killed. Nothing will ever be the same for anyone.

Episode 27
"Somebody Is Watching Me!"

Vithya notices Shan's grief but is unable to help him. Manju spots Seelan and Regina. And lo and behold! The serial killer strikes again. But this time, he is too close for comfort.

Episode 28
"Revelations"

Radha finds out about her sister's secret activities. When Nantha confronts Angel about it, things get out of hand. Meanwhile, Manju's secret life is revealed. Is her story taking a whole new twist?

Episode 29
"You Are Not the Boss of Me!"

After harboring the grudge for days, Shan finally confronts Seelan about his dalliance with Regina and things get messy. Will they become too caught up in their personal mess to realise that a snake is inching its way close?

Episode 30
"He-Who-Must-Not-Be-Named"

The one who shall not be named inches closer and gets under the skin of a loved one. He has wormed his way too close for comfort. Where will this lead?

Episode 31
"The Weakest Link"

When a loved one is found dead, the team is close to crumbling under the emotional upheaval. But the predator must be caught, so the team needs to pull it together. Weak links need to be cut. Who will it be? Will they recover in time to nab the serial killer?

Episode 32
"It Is Not Over Till It Is Over!"

The team is interrogated about the Chief's death. Will this reveal new surprises? Meanwhile, Pravin resurfaces again. This time, his eyes are on someone within the team. Who is that?

Episode 33
"Wanted Dead or Alive!"

Radha offers herself as a scapegoat to lure Pravin out, amidst protests from her team. Will this plan work?

Episode 34
"I Will Do Anything For Love."

Nantha is impressed with Radha's commitment to friendship. Does this spell love? Is Nantha ready to embrace love in his life again?

Episode 35
"Oh, The Guilt!"

Regina chances upon Manju and notices her ill health. Will this affect her relationship with Seelan? And after a botched attempt on the stakeout, the unit is stranded in a sea of self-recriminations and guilt! Will they drown or dive deeper to find the parasite?

Episode 36
"Watch Me Watching You"

Radha goes as a human bait to lure Pravin out. But Pravin outsmarts them. How? Watch him watching them!

Episode 37
"Killing Me Softly"

Radha is in the clutches of manic Pravin. If you think you know how sick Pravin can get, think again. The slow torture that Radha goes through is a worse fate than death itself. Nothing will ever be the same.

Episode 38
"60 Minutes"

The unit receives a mysterious parcel. It is a DVD containing footage with clues about Radha's location. The psychopath is riddling the unit to find Radha. The deadline is one hour. Will they find her? And when they do find a body at the end, is it indeed Radha or someone else?

Episode 39
"To Live Is To Die."

Will Radha survive the fate that Pravin carved out for her? Watch this week's final episode where nothing and no one will ever be the same.

Episode 40
"The Black Hole"

If there are three words to say about life: "It goes on." Radha is gone but the unit must stay afloat and rectify all their mistakes and misjudgments. As a first step, a new female officer comes to replace Radha. How will Suganya cope with this unit's intense dynamics? Meanwhile, Mugi and Prakash manage to discover Pravin's exact location. Will this signal the end of Lucifer?

Episode 41
"The Boy Next Door"

Behind every successful man, there is a woman, they say. Behind every maniac, there may be several. What is the story of Pravin? Let's rewind and watch how the boy next door became a maniac on the loose.

Episode 42
"Good Morning, Teacher!"

Pravin's mother catches him in a 'compromising' situation with his tuition teacher. The tyrannical mother will not let this slide, will she? Watch as the scars grow deeper.

Episode 43
"All By Myself"

Pravin learns to stand on his own feet with a new-found mentor – Ragu. But his scarred heart finds a reprieve in a girl called Priya. Will she mend his heart?

Episode 44
"You Are My Sunshine"

Pravin does something for Priya which gets him into more trouble. But Pravin manages to catch a ray of sunlight, called Regina, in that gloom.

Episode 45
"Back to Reality"

Pravin leaves his insecurities and bares his soul to Regina. Will she accept him? Meanwhile, it is back to reality for the unit which must forge ahead to nab Pravin.

Episode 46
"All Is Fair in Love and War"

Mugi and Prakash are trying to win over Suganya. But on a more serious note, Seelan must make a drastic decision to ensure his unit's safety and success. Will Shan suffer the brunt of this decision?

Episode 47
"R & P"

The team is putting together the puzzle pieces and with Regina's help, they finally put a face to the maniac's name and crimes. The hunt begins today!

Episode 48
"Seven Murders and Counting"

Based on surveillance of his friends, the team is getting near to Pravin's trail. But Pravin prepares for his next murder so that he can leave Ragu's house scot-free in a masquerade.

Episode 49
"Cliff Hanger"

Pravin emerges from his hideout. But the team is prepared. Or are they? It is an intense chase. It is the day of reckoning. It is the final showdown. Pravin versus Team Vettai. Buckle up, people! Many scores are to be settled.

Episode 50
"Judgement Day!"

The final showdown between Pravin and Team Vettai. One side will go down. Which will it be?

Episode 51
"She Loves Me, She Loves Me Not."

Putting behind the trauma of all they have gone through; the team is back to its normal routine. But Seelan finally discovers why his wife is cold toward him. Is it too late for him to mend her broken heart and soul?

Episode 52
"கவிதைகள் சொல்லவா? (Kavithhaigal Sollavaa?)"

"You can shed tears that she is gone,

Or you can smile because she has lived. Your heart can be empty because you cannot see her, or you can be full of the love you shared. You can turn your back on tomorrow and live yesterday,

Or you can be happy for tomorrow because of yesterday. You can remember her only that she is gone, or you can cherish her memory and let it live on. You can cry and close your mind,

Be empty and turn your back. Or you can do what she would want: smile, open your eyes, love and go on."

At the end of the day, they are just human after all. Will Seelan emerge from this loss as a stronger person or crumble under the weight of the pain? Stand by Seelan as he endures his ultimate loss.

Episode 53
"The Calm Before the Storm!"

Seelan tries his best to recover from his loss. Mugi has his heart broken by Suganya and Prakash. Outwardly everything seems fine. However, the unit is grappling with unsolved mysteries. Watch them tie up loose ends in their personal lives before standing by for their biggest storm yet.

Episode 54
"Effective Immediately!"

The chief's murder file is reopened. But Seelan hands in his resignation letter. What is his real motive for doing so?

Episode 55
"You Give Love a Bad Name"

Nantha loses his cool when Suganya mentions Radha casually. But he loses it even more when Regina tries to prod him about his past with an officer called Arthi. Radha and Arthi. The two chapters in Nantha's life. How similar or different are they?

Episode 56
"பேசாமலே உலறுகிறேன்"("Pesamaley Ularugiren.")

We rewind back to Nantha's cadet training days and relive how he meets a girl called Arthi. How does Arthi help Nantha break out from his self-imposed wall? How does she end his inner struggle and become a ray of sunshine in his dark, gloomy life.

Episode 57
"Will You Be My Magic?"

Arthi has fallen head over heels in love with Nantha. But will he feel the same for her? Or will he push her away like he always pushes love out of his life?

Episode 58
"Dead End Or Maybe Not!"

After months of dead ends, there is finally a breakthrough in the Chief's murder case. Will this important clue lead the unit to answers?

Episode 59
"Angel and Demons"

Angel finds herself in a deep mess with Bose. She tries to leave his clutches, but to no avail. Can Nantha help her?

Episode 60
"The Two Hundred Dollar Man!"

The lead that will bring the missing puzzles together to form a bigger picture – The $200 Man is nabbed today. What will he reveal about the Chief's murder?

Episode 61
"The Fox!"

Questions on everyone's mind: Who is the fox? Who is the spy? Who has been leaking information to a drug syndicate all this time? Could it really be someone from the unit?

Episode 62
"Product of Circumstances!"

No one is born a criminal. We are all the product of our circumstances. What drove Nantha to be who he is? Rewind back to see Nantha's living conditions as a young boy and the entry of Bose in his life.

Episode 63
"Product of Circumstances!"

Nantha's mother, Vatsala, endures all kinds of torture at the hands of vultures who want to prey on her pitiful situation. Then she meets Bose. How will he change her life?

Episode 64
"The Curse of Loyalty"

Nantha's life and aspirations take a turn when Bose tells him what to do in his life. Nantha is left with little choice but to agree.

Episode 65
"ரணங்கள் உன்னைக் கொன்றால்." ("If Ranas Kill You.")

Arthi puts herself on the line to catch a criminal. But this ends up as another turbulent turning point in Nantha's life.

Episode 66
"Date With The Enemy"

Dayanidhi's unexpected murder has been an unsolved mystery in the unit until now. Events leading up to that gruesome murder unfold tonight!

Episode 67
"What, Why, When, Who, How!"

Seelan attempts to connect all the dots with the only lead that he has - the $200 man! What connects this man with the Chief's murder?

Episode 69
"The Chase! – Part 1"

Seelan determines that Nantha is the informer within the unit. He activates the unit and assembles a team to track down Nantha and Bose. Where is Nantha hiding? Will Seelan be able to close in on him? See the chase from Seelan's point of view.

Episode 70
"The Chase! – Part 2"

While Seelan was hunting high and low for him, where was Nantha? Witness all of Nantha the fugitive's steps and strategies tonight!

Episode 71
"I Am Calling the Shots!"

Nantha is on the run. All that is on his mind is to save Bose and Angel. How will he do that? He sees no way out. But for a man with nothing to lose there is little that can stop him from getting what he wants. What is Nantha going to do? How many lives will be put at risk?

Episode 72
"Final Showdown!"

Nantha takes a bus hostage in a desperate final attempt to save Angel and Bose. Will he succeed? Even if he saves them, though, what will happen to him? Who will emerge victorious in the battle between Seelan and Nantha?

== Vettai finale preview ==
Vettai's final three episodes were shown on Cathay, Orchard Cineleisure, at 7:00 pm.

== Soundtrack ==
Vettai

Soundtrack album
- Released: 20 November 2010
- Recorded: 2010
- Genre: Drama soundtrack

Vettai's soundtrack consists of two tracks composed and sung by Shabir and Rishi Kumaar. The song "Tadak Tadak" also included Malaysian rapper Emcee Jazz. "Oru Murai" love theme lyrics were written by Jaya Rathakrishnan.

== Awards ==
The police drama Vettai : Pledged to Hunt took home many awards at Pradhana Vizha 2011, Vasantham's annual awards show honouring the best in the local television industry.

- Best Opening Title - Pradhana Vizha 2011
- Most Popular Series - Pradhana Vizha 2011
- Best Actor, Shabir - Pradhana Vizha 2011
