= Rayil Sneham =

Rayil Sneham (transl. Train friendship) is an Indian Tamil-language travel series focusing on different countries.

== Season 3 ==
Rayil Sneham
- No. of episodes: 13

Release
- Original network: MediaCorp Vasantham
- Original release: 18 October 2016 – 10 January 2017

Season 3 focused on China. Each episode highlights the history, culture, architecture and wildlife of China. This 3 season series has all the original footage. It is hosted by Nithiya Rao. It aired every Tuesday at 9:00 PM SST on MediaCorp Vasantham from 18 October 2016 to 10 January 2017 for 13 episodes.

=== List of episodes ===
Episode	Location	Telecast date
1	Kunming	18 October 2016
2	Yunnan: including its famous Crossing bridge noodles, the remarkable Stone Forest and peculiar Hanging Coffins.	25 October 2016
3	Leshan Giant Buddha: sees the astonishing Dazu Caves and gets cuddled by China's national treasure.	1 November 2016
4	Jinli: sees the astonishing Dazu Caves and gets cuddled by China's national treasure.	8 November 2016
5	learns the art of Chinese Opera, tastes China's spiciest dish, Mala Hotpot and recollects memories of her past life, as an Avatar?	15 November 2016
6	she walks on the glass skywalk almost 5000 feet above the ground! Watch as she uncovers the mystery behind.	22 November 2016
7	city of Wuzhen, she learns about a peculiar food dish, Squirrel Shaped Fish?	29 November 2016
8	Dr.Sun Yat Sen Mausoleum where thousands of people pay respect to the Father of the Republic and the Massacre Hall which howls the story behind the 300,000 victims who died!	6 December 2016
9	The cosmopolitan city of China, Shanghai! She explores several amazing places including the Oriental Pearl Tower, People's Square and Bund Tunnel and also gets an unexpected marriage proposal at the most unusual place!	13 December 2016
10	learn martial arts from the Kungfu masters! She climbs almost 1500 steps up Song Mountain to finally see the true Bodhidharma's cave	20 December 2016
11	Into Xi'an City, where she explores the breathtaking Terracotta Army! She travels on to find out about the ancient city wall and the intriguing Bell and Drum Towers of Xi'an.	27 December 2016
12	Finally arrives at Beijing and ventures out to explore several remarkable places like Tianmen Square and the Forbidden City. She also learns about Tamil-speaking Chinese Radio Jockeys and climbs the Great Wall of China.	3 January 2017
13	Into Panjin, where the unbelievable red beach exist! She then ventures into Harbin City and learns about the Siberian Tigers and the Ice City!	10 January 2017

=== Broadcast ===
The series was released on 18 October 2016 on Mediacorp Vasantham. It aired in Singapore on Mediacorp Vasantham, Its full-length episodes and released its episodes on their app Toggle, a live TV feature was introduced on Toggle with English Subtitles.

=== Nominations ===
It was nominated for Best Infotainment at the Silver Screen International awards.

== Season 4 ==
Pradhana Vizha 2021

- Best Scripting (Other Genres) - T.N. Sanjeevi
