= 1943: Kappaleriya Thamizhan =

- Also known as: 1943
- 1943: கப்பலேறிய தமிழன்
- Genre: Historical drama
- Written by: K.S.I.Sundar
- Screenplay by: Dialogue; Ashwinii Selvaraj; Vijalaxmi Kannan; K.S.I.Sundar
- Directed by: K.S.I.Sundar
- Starring: Jaynesh Isuran; Dhivyah Raveen; Apple Chan; Richard Low; Tharakshi; Lingam; Iliyash
- Country of origin: Singapore
- Original language: Tamil
- No. of seasons: 1
- No. of episodes: 36

Production
- Executive producer: K.S.I. Sundar
- Producers: AG Sahbinah; Vijay Balaji; KG Kumar
- Cinematography: Segar Varathan
- Editor: Paul
- Camera setup: 8k
- Running time: approx. 22–24 minutes per episode
- Production company: Perfectimage00 Entertainment

Original release
- Network: Mediacorp Vasantham
- Release: 29 November 2023 – 5 February 2024

1943: Kappaleriya Thamizhan (1943: கப்பலேறிய தமிழன்) also known as 1943 is a 2023 Singapore Tamil-language Historical television series, starring Jaynesh Isuran, Dhivyah Raveen, Apple Chan, Tharakshi, Lingam, Iliyash and Richard Low. The story revolves around Kannan (Jaynesh Isuran), who's determined to fight for his rights, but faces intense pursuit.

It is written and directed by K.S.I.Sundar and produced by AG Sahbinah, Vijay Balaji and KG Kumar under the banner of Perfectimage00 Entertainment. It started airing on Mediacorp Vasantham from 29 November 2023 to 5 February 2024 for 36 episodes on Monday to Thursday at 21:00, replacing Anbin Aaram. The series also streams on mewatch. The show is claimed to be one of the highest budget series on Singapore Tamil television.

== Premise ==
1943: Kappaleriya Thamizhan tells the story of Kannan (Jaynesh Isuran) has devoted himself to the cause of India's freedom from the British Raj.

== Cast ==
=== Main ===
- Jaynesh Isuran as Karmegam Kannan
  - A quiet yet determined young Tamil man in British-ruled India. When his family faces extortion by a ruthless British Army General, Kannan unveils a shocking truth. Fleeing from British pursuit, Kannan then boards the Rajula Ship bound for Singapore.
- Dhivyah Raveen as Tamizharasi
  - A headstrong, stubborn, and fiercely intelligent young Tamil Girl. Her adopted Chinese brothers and their tragic demise shatters her world, driving her to seek vengeance for their unjust murder.
- Apple Chan as Grace
  - She is the daughter of the Japanese General. She is a stark contrast to her father innocent, naive and blissfully unaware of his brutal actions. Unlike her father, she treasures justice and honesty.
- Richard Low as The General
  - A Japanese General is the mastermind behind Operation Sook Ching, a brutal mission in Singapore targeting Anti-Japanese elements.
- Tharakshi Alluri as Seetha
  - She loves Kannan one-sidedly, and she's all in for his revolutionary mission. She sticks with Kannan's family until the end and remains a pillar of support, facing the atrocities of the British.

=== Supporting ===
- Lingam
- Iliyash
- Kokila Gobinathan as Saraswathi (Kannan's Mother, Seetha's Aunt)
- Nagharaj as Anbarasan
- Raguvaran Naidu as Vengaiyan
- Kris Mavericko as Anbu
- Selvaganthan PM
- Rajarani Pandiyan as Kannan's Father
- Krishnan
- Leena
- Anees Hameed
- Pandi Ravi
- L. Ganapathy
- Veerasamar

== Production ==
=== Casting ===
Actor Jaynesh Isuran was cast as Karmegam Kannan, who is fighting against British Raj. Actor Richard Low plays a Japanese general who plans the Sook Ching operation during the Japanese occupation, Who is involved in the killing of Tamizharasi's family and friends during the massacre. Apple Chan cast as The General's daughter Grace. This is making Richard Low and Apple Chan performing their first role in Tamil television.

Dhivyah Raveen was cast as Tamizharasi, who is justifying her quest for retribution as a fight against oppression. Bakasuran film fame Tharakshi plays the role of Seetha, who loves Kannan one-sidedly.

=== Filming ===
The first schedule of filming was held in Tamil Nadu. Scenes that took place in Karaikudi on 19 June and Chennai were shot on location. The second schedule of filming was held in Malaysia.

== Original soundtrack ==
=== Title song ===
It was written by lyricist Vairamuthu, composed by the music director Deva. The title song of the serial is sung by the Playback Singer Ananthu.

=== Soundtrack ===
Track listing
No.	Title	Lyrics	Singer(s)	Length
1.	"Engal Vaanam Engal Kaatru (எங்கள் வானம் எங்கள் காற்று)"	Vairamuthu	Ananthu	3:01
2.	"Nangaiyae (நங்கையே)"	J.S.Raja Sha	Abrahaam Nithya Pandian, N.Pavithra	1:56
