= Pugaippadam =

- Theatrical release poster
- Directed by: Rajesh Lingam
- Written by: Rajesh Lingam
- Produced by: N. C. Manekandan
- Starring: Priya Anand; Yamini; Mrinalini; Nandha; Shivam; Amzath Khan; Harish
- Cinematography: Vijay Armstrong
- Edited by: B. Lenin
- Music by: Gangai Amaran
- Production companies: Boyz Studio; Mayabazaar Cinemas
- Release date: 1 January 2010
- Country: India
- Language: Tamil

Pugaippadam (transl. Photograph) is a 2010 Indian Tamil-language buddy drama film written and directed by Rajesh Lingam, in his directorial debut. The cast includes Priya Anand, Mrinalini, Yamini, Nandha, Shivam, Amzath Khan and Harish. The music was composed by Gangai Amaran with cinematography by Vijay Armstrong and editing by B. Lenin. The film was released on 1 January 2010.

== Plot ==
Krishna, Nandha, Bala, Guru, Krithika Rao alias KK, and Gowri become friends in college. Shiney George joins their circle of friends, and soon, Shiney and Krishna fall in love. Gowri has been in love with Guru since they met. However, Guru refuses her advances, saying that they should not break their friendship. He and Krishna later fail a few exams. Afterward, Shiney slaps Krishna, and Guru fights with her. The group splits between boys and girls. They reunite after the interrogation of the lecturers. The group helps Guru and Krishna clear their debts and get jobs. Shiney's father also accepts his daughter's love. Krishna and Shiney reveal their love to their friends. However, that night, Bala commits suicide.

In the hospital, Gowri says that Bala died for Shiney because he was in love with her. Bala had admired Shiney from their first meeting and loved her when she supported him at the time of ragging. He told Gowri about these feelings that morning and decided to tell his friends before telling Shiney. The plan went awry when Shiney slapped Krishna and the friendship broke up. Guru became angry and rushed to the college.

In the college, Shiney and Krishna say that they will not marry because they feel guilty about Bala's death. Krithika says that it is only possible that they die together. Nandha tells her that they never would have been complete without their friend, whom they have lost forever. He also adds that if they all knew about anyone's love earlier, then they would not have lost Bala, meaning that they were not loyal to themselves or their friendship. After this, everybody cries and leaves the scene one by one.

== Cast ==
- Priya Anand as Shiney George
- Mrinalini as Gowri
- Yamini as Krithika Rao (KK)
- Nandha as Nandha
- Shivam as Guru
- Amzath Khan as Krishna
- Harish as Bala
- Venkat
- Vinu Chakravarthy
- Shanmuga Sundaram
- G. Gnanasambandam
- Neelima Rani

== Production ==
The film was announced in May 2008. It is the directorial debut of Rajesh Lingam, previously an associate of Selvaraghavan. The cast was almost entirely newcomers. The male lead, Amzath Khan, was previously associated with Radio One. This was the first project signed by Priya Anand, although Vaamanan (2009) became her first release. Orator and professor G. Gnanasambandan played an important role. The filming was held at Chennai and Kodaikanal.

== Soundtrack ==
The soundtrack was composed by Gangai Amaran. The audio launch was held on 24 June 2009.

Track listing
No.	Title	Singer(s)	Length
1.	"Pennilamae Onnumilae"	Krish, Balaji, MK
2.	"Oru Kudayil Payanam"	Venkat Prabhu, Prashanthini
3.	"Vaan Nilavudhaan"	Vijay Yesudas
4.	"Idhu Kanavo Idhu Nijamo"	S. P. Balasubrahmanyam, K. S. Chithra
5.	"Odaikanum Odaikunam"	Haricharan, Vijay Yesudas
6.	"Padapadavena"	Gangai Amaran

== Critical reception ==
Sify gave the film a verdict of 'average' and wrote that "Let us hope Rajesh Lingam finds a more racy script in his next outing". Pavithra Srinivasan of Rediff.com gave the film a rating of two out of five stars and wrote that "If only Rajesh Lingam had kept the initial chemistry between the characters intact, we'd have had a cult classic. As it is, Pugaippadam now works only in parts". S. R. Ashok Kumar of The Hindu wrote that the film "is interesting in parts, but an improved screenplay would have made it work better. A love story also finds its way into the story, but it soon starts meandering".
