= Killer Not Stupid =

2019 film by Jack Neo

- Theatrical release poster
- Directed by: Jack Neo
- Starring: Jay Shih; Amber An; Na-dow; Gadrick Chin; Apple Chan
- Production companies: J Team Productions; MM2 Entertainment
- Distributed by: Golden Village Pictures
- Release dates: 5 February 2019 (Singapore); 23 January 2020 (Taiwan)
- Running time: 110 minutes
- Countries: Singapore; Taiwan
- Language: Mandarin

Killer Not Stupid (Chinese: 杀手不笨; pinyin: Shāshǒu bù bèn) is a 2019 Singaporean-Taiwanese action comedy film directed by Jack Neo. The film tells the story about the roadtrip adventure of two men's one final mission in Taiwan before ending their careers as assassins. It is released on 5 February 2019 in Singapore and Malaysia.

== Plot ==
Two assassins, Hornet (Jay Shih) and Mark (Na-dow) decide to end their careers with a final mission. Along the journey in Taichung, they meet several interesting characters: former classmate, Sha Bao (Gadrick Chin), a Filipino drug lord's god-daughter Talia (Amber An), and her friend Ira (Apple Chan). Action ramps up as they begin their hilarious adventure in Taiwan while completing the mission and running away from their killer's hunt.

== Cast ==
- Jay Shih as Hornet
- Amber An as Talia
- Na-dow as Mark
- Gadrick Chin as Sha Bao
- Apple Chan as Ira
- Ryan Lian as Grandma
- Lin Mei-hsiu as Ah Bu
- Shin Lung as Wild Boar
