= Udaya Soundari =

Singaporean Indian Tamil actress

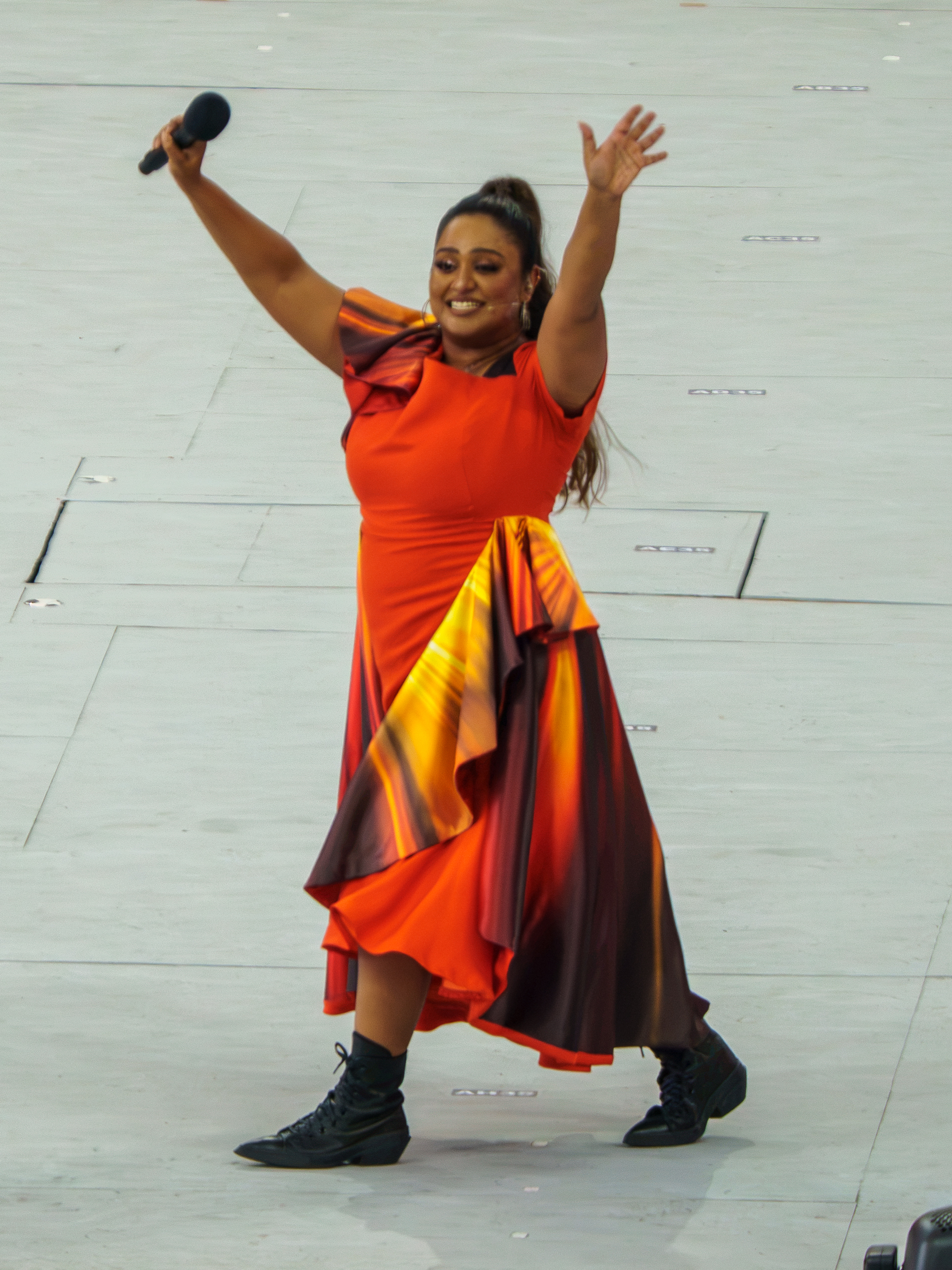
- Udaya Soundari at National Day Parade 2026
- Born: 28 April 1988 (age 38); Tiong Bahru, Singapore
- Other name: Soundari
- Occupations: Actress, Television presenter
- Years active: 2011–present
- Relatives: Malene (sister)

Udaya Soundari (born 28 April 1988) is a Singaporean Indian television actress and television presenter. She has appeared in films such as Parandhu Sella Vaa (2016) and A Yellow Bird (2016). She is also the first person in Singapore to win three awards in one year at the Pradhana Vizha festival.

== Early life ==
Udaya was born and raised in Singapore. She also has a younger sister who is also a television actress called Malene.

== Career ==
In 2026, she hosted National Day Parade for the first time.

== Personal life ==
=== Sex scandal controversy ===
In 2015, a sex tape appeared in social media featuring a woman looking like Udaya. Udaya said that it was not her.

== Filmography ==
=== Television ===
Year	Program	Role	Notes	Ref
2011-2016	Rayil Sneham (season 3)	Host		
2012	Neenga Readiya	Host		
2012	Riya	Lakshmi	Television drama	
2013	Savithri	Kanaka	Television drama	
2017	Udayam	Host		
2018	FAM	Emma	Television drama	
2019	Michael Chiang's Mixed Signals	Vanda	Television drama	
2019	Avathaaram	Priya	Television drama	
2021	Deepavali Countdown 2021	Host		
2020	Thiruvai Malarvai	MRS Thiru	Television drama	
2021	Pattaasu Productions	Sita	Television drama	
2021	Arivaan	Uma	Television drama	
2021	CID Sakoonthala	Sakoonthala	Television drama	
2021	Slow Dancing	Yashooda	Television drama	
2022	Amarkala Deepavali 2022	Host		
2022	Kattradhu Kadhal	Nandhini	Television drama	
2024	Karuvanam	Shalini	Television drama	

=== Films ===
Year	Title	Role	Notes	Ref
2016	Parandhu Sella Vaa	Sanghavi		
2016	A Yellow Bird	Pavani		
2017	Together Apart: Sanjay	Divya		

== Awards and nominations ==
Year	Award	Category	Work	Result
2014	Pradhana Vizha	Best Actress	A Yellow Bird	Won
2014	Pradhana Vizha	Best Media Personality		Won
2014	Pradhana Vizha	Most Popular Female Personality		Won
2016	Pradhana Vizha	Most Popular Female Personality		Nominated
2022	Pradhana Vizha	Best Comedy Performance	Adukku Veetu Annasamy	Won
2022	Pradhana Vizha	Best Host Female	Amarkala Deepavali 2022	Won
2022	Pradhana Vizha	Best Actress	CID Sakoonthala	Won
