= American mappillai =

Stock character in Tamil cinema

The American mappillai (transl. American groom) also known as America mappillai, is a stock character in Tamil cinema, a NRI man who is portrayed as a potential suitor of the female lead character but is often turned down in favour of the Indian lead character.

== Characteristics ==
D. Arachi of Fully Filmy noted that American mappillais are often characterised by their attractive looks, tallness, fair skin, ownership of an expensive car and better grasp of English than the film's Tamil protagonist. Variations of the American mappillai also appear in Tamil films, such as the Delhi mappillai, Dubai mappillai, London mappillai and Bangalore mappillai. In her thesis Watching from an Arm's Length: The Foreign Hand in Tamil Cinema, Preeti Mudliar notes "the foreign mapillai (groom) finds that his status as a foreign-returned groom is undermined by either his villainous intentions, his fundamental inferiority to the values and virile appeal of the local son of the soil, or the comic relief he provides as a misfit in the changed landscape of the society he was once a part of. In short, the foreign-returned groom is frequently the loser in the romantic toss". Referring to his 1997 film Minsara Kanavu, Rajiv Menon noted that "the privilege of the foreign automatically makes the groom a suspicious person when he comes to bride-hunt", explaining why Arvind Swamy's character in the film eventually lost out on the woman.

== Examples ==
Actor Karthik Kumar has portrayed such characters in Alai Payuthey (2000) and Kanda Naal Mudhal (2005). The actor briefly announced his retirement in 2016, suggesting he was tired of being typecast in such roles. Director M. Rajesh has used the character several times in his films, such as through Arun (Arya) in Siva Manasula Sakthi (2009) and Shiva (Jiiva) in Boss Engira Bhaskaran (2010). Other prominent examples include Samuel (Abbas) in Minnale (2001), Arvind Singh (Prakash Raj) in Azhagiya Theeye (2004), Mithun Tejasvi in Sandai (2008), Roy (Benito) in Vinnaithaandi Varuvaayaa (2010), Rakesh (T. M. Karthik) in Nanban (2012), Gautham (Rajeev Ravindranathan) in Vettai (2012), Deepak (Rahul Ravindran) in Vanakkam Chennai (2013) and Ashwin Kumar Lakshmikanthan in Oh Manapenne! (2021).

== Legacy ==
Arachi drew comparisons with another stock character in Tamil films, "London ponnu" (transl. London girl), that is often typecast as "a character with modern outfits (at least in the first half)" who then changes tones from "stubborn to submissive in the later half." In 2018, a streaming series titled America Mappillai was released, with the director announcing that he hoped to "destroy the stereotype".
