= Theeviram =

2020 Indian Tamil-language drama thriller film directed by Michael Muthu

- Directed by: Michael Muthu
- Written by: Michael Muthu
- Produced by: Anil Jain; Sameer Bharat Jain
- Starring: Gokul Anand; Amzath Khan; Arjun Chidambaram; Sharath Ravi
- Cinematography: Jagadeesh Sundaramurthy
- Edited by: Athiappan Siva
- Music by: Kalacharan
- Production companies: Super Talkies; Refex Entertainment
- Release date: 26 November 2020
- Country: India
- Language: Tamil

Theeviram (transl. Severity) is a 2020 Indian Tamil-language drama thriller film directed by Michael Muthu on his directorial debut starring Gokul Anand, Amzath Khan, Arjun Chidambaram and Sharath Ravi. The film's main theme revolves around terrorism, depicting the radicalisation of young boys into becoming suicide bombers. The film was set in the backdrop of Chennai.

== Cast ==
- Gokul Anand as Abbas
- Amzath Khan as Masood
- Arjun Chidambaram as Ismail
- Brahadeeshwar Chandilya as Zack
- Prashanth Oliver as Jaleel
- Sharath Ravi as Yakub
- Darshana Rajendran as Alia
- Namita Anand as Alisha
- Deepa Nambiar as Abbas' mother
- Namita Krishnamurthy as Nilufer
- Gautham Vasudev Menon as DCP Vikraman (special appearance)
- Velu as Abdul Hameed

== Production ==
In January 2017, the film project was announced by veteran theater actor Michael Muthu as his maiden directorial full-fledged feature film venture, and he revealed that it would be a bilingual film titled The Way Things Are in English and Theeviram in Tamil. Muthu had previously made an attempt to make his directorial debut in 2002, but the project, which was titled The Girl, failed to materialize, and the project was subsequently shelved.

Muthu revealed that the story he narrated was specifically meant to be for a theatrical play, but he later changed his mind to convert his script into a full-length feature film after realizing that the theme around the three stories had vast potential to be presented in a more meaningful way through film mode. Initially, Muthu proposed plans to shoot the film entirely as an English-language film. Sameer Bharat Ram, who was on board to produce the film under his production banner, Local Talkies, convinced Muthu to shoot the film in Tamil as well. The filmmakers conducted rehearsals and auditions for a duration of 30 days to find suitable cast members prior to the commencement of the principal photography of the film. Muthu rehearshed with the cast for 30 days before shooting to reduce extra takes, saving money and allowing the production to shoot at "breakeck speed" with a goal of four scenes per day. Filmmaker Gautham Vasudev Menon was roped in to play a National Investigation Agency officer.

== Soundtrack ==
Theeviram

Soundtrack album by Kalacharan
- Released: 2020
- Recorded: 2020
- Genre: Feature film soundtrack
- Language: Tamil
- Label: MRT Music

Kalacharan chronology
Mamakiki (2020)	Theeviram (2020)

The soundtrack is composed by Kalacharan with lyrics were written by Shrenik Viswanathan.

Track listing
No.	Title	Singer(s)	Length
1.	"Nee Meendum Vaa (Promo Song)"	Sid Sriram	4:44
2.	"Dhooram"	Sindhuri Vishal, Aarifullah Shah Khalifye Rifayi
