= America Mappillai =

2018 Tamil Language web series

- Poster image
- Genre: Comedy
- Written by: Raja Ramamurthy
- Directed by: PraveenPadmanabhan
- Starring: Raja Krishnamoorthy; Leela Samson; Arjun Chidambaram; Namita Krishnamurthy; Gokul Anand; Rakesh Ram
- Theme music composer: RH Vikram
- Country of origin: India
- Original language: Tamil
- No. of seasons: 1
- No. of episodes: 8 (list of episodes)

Production
- Editor: Mounica Kumar
- Camera setup: Multi-camera
- Running time: approx. 8 - 11 minutes

Original release
- Network: ZEE5
- Release: 14 February 2018

America Mappillai (transl. The Groom from America) is a 2018 Tamil-language streaming television series, starring Raja Krishnamoorthy, Leela Samson, Arjun Chidambaram, Namita Krishnamurthy, Rakesh Ram and Gokul Anand. It premiered on ZEE5 from 2018. The show was writer by Raja Ramamurthy and director by Praveen Padmanabhan.

== Synopsis ==
Ganesh is a young man who his father constantly nags to get married. His gay friend suggests that Ganesh pretend to be gay so as to avoid marriage. Ganesh acts out the plan but there are unintended consequences.

== Cast ==
- Raja Krishnamoorthy
- Leela Samson as Vasantha
- Arjun Chidambaram as Ganesh
- Namita Krishnamurthy
- Gokul Anand as Karthik
- Rakesh Ram
- Delhi Ganesh

=== Special appearances ===
- M. S. Bhaskar
- Sruthi Hariharan as Shabana

== Episodes ==
No. overall	No. in season	Title	Directed by	Written by	Original release date
1	1	"Yellow"	Praveen Padmanabhan	Raja Ramamurthy	14 February 2018
2	2	"Violet"	Praveen Padmanabhan	Raja Ramamurthy	14 February 2018
3	3	"Green"	Praveen Padmanabhan	Raja Ramamurthy	14 February 2018
4	4	"Indigo"	Praveen Padmanabhan	Raja Ramamurthy	14 February 2018
5	5	"Turquoise"	Praveen Padmanabhan	Raja Ramamurthy	14 February 2018
6	6	"Pink"	Praveen Padmanabhan	Raja Ramamurthy	14 February 2018
7	7	"Orange"	Praveen Padmanabhan	Raja Ramamurthy	14 February 2018
8	8	"Red"	Praveen Padmanabhan	Raja Ramamurthy	14 February 2018

== Reception ==
The News Minute reviewed America Mappillai as a light hearted and funny webseries. They also stated that it was hard to understand the characters due to lack of time to elaborate more about the individuals. The series takes on the Indian obsession of marriages and caste differences. Anyhow, the format of the series is easy to understand.

The Indian Express gave a review of the series stating that the story is quite interesting but some moments portrayed in the series feel stagey and unnatural. The episodes in the web series are named after colours in an ode to its queer story, with minimal music. Some moments throughout the series don’t have any sound, however, the silence in those scenes was brilliant. The overall performance of the actors in America Mappillai was good.

A Pot Pourri Of Vestiges reviewed by stating that the series has an interesting perspective on marriages in India. America Mallipai overturns all the stereotypes making the series a worthy addition to binge-watch all eight episodes in one go. The director of the series Praveen Padmanabhan has done a great job in bringing out the right kind of performances from all the actors.
