= Vetri (TV series) =

Vetri is a soap opera that aired on MediaCorp Vasantham.

== Season 2 ==
Vetri
- Starring: Jaynesh; Anand K Eswari Gunasagar; Nishmen; Mahalakshimi; Thirumagal; Janani Devi
- No. of episodes: 47

Release
- Original network: MediaCorp Vasantham
- Original release: 22 June – 11 September 2015

Vetri (season 2) is a 2015 soap opera that aired Monday through Thursday on MediaCorp Vasantham from 22 June 2015 10 September 2015 for 47 episodes.

The show starred Jaynesh, Anand K, Eswari Gunasagar, Nishmen, Mahalakshimi, Thirumagal and Janani Devi among others. The show final episode aired 11 September 2015.

=== Plot ===
The story of Vetri Vel, a motivational speaker becomes a Coach who inspires and makes the students realize their potential. Most importantly he teaches them good values and morals turning average students into good, well-mannered responsible human being.

Season 2 happens 8 years after Season 1. Vetri is now a full-time motivational speaker at Leadership Rise. Kayal is the Chemistry HOD at Delta Secondary school and the teacher-in-charge of ICS. She has also ventured into tutoring.

Ms.Usha asks Vetri to return to Delta secondary as a freelance coach to motivate the ICS students to participate in a race. This is a difficult task, as Anand one of the members died during last year's race. It is up to Vetri to motivate them.

In the meantime, Kayal has ventured in tutoring and meets Vikram her first tutee. Deva, Vikram's father, takes an interest in Kayal and repeatedly tries to separate Kayal and Vetri.

=== Characters ===
==== Vetri Vel ====
A full-time Motivational Speaker at Leadership Rise. He is an inspiring and self-righteous person who motivates students and adults to be a good person. He is also temporarily a freelance coach at Delta Secondary School. He married Kayalvizhi and they have one son, Raghav.

==== Kayal Vizhi ====
Kayal is Vetri's wife. She is the chemistry HOD at Delta Secondary school, and the teacher in-charge of ICS. She is kind and bubbly.

==== Mr. Mano ====
Mano is the mathematics teacher and discipline master at Delta Secondary School. He has a crush on Harini.

==== Harini ====
Harini is the new Tamil teacher at Delta Secondary School.

==== Deva ====
Deva is the father of one of Kayal's tutees, Vikram. When Kayal goes to tutor Vikram, Deva takes a liking to her and takes photos of her without her knowledge. This is later discovered by Sonia, his wife. Deva then continues pursuing Kayal and tries to create problems between Kayal and Vetri.

==== Sonia ====
Sonia is Deva's wife and Vikram's mother. She finds out that Deva has been taking pictures of Kayal and is disgusted. She blames Kayal for the incident and files for a divorce. Later she goes to one of Vetri's motivational talks to befriend Vetri and lets him of know of what happened between Kayal and Deva. However Vetri tells her that he trusts Kayal, and makes her realise that Deva is the one who erred.

==== Varun ====
Varun is a student at Delta Secondary and the captain of the race team. He is also formerly Anand's best friend. He initially refuses to rejoin the team, as he feels indirectly responsible for Anand's death.

==== Hema ====
Hema is a student and a member of the race team. She has financial issues at home and works at odd jobs. She later gets in trouble at her workplace and Vetri comes to the rescue.

==== Mantra ====
Mantra is a studious student and a member of the race team. She is shown to be best friends with Vedhika and does everything with her. In initial episodes, mantra's older brother and vedhika's older sister are going to get married. However a problem occurs and the marriage gets called off. This causes a problem in mantra's friendship with Vedhika. Kayal and Vetri help them realise their friendship is too precious to lose and they reconcile.

==== Vedhika ====
Vedhika is Mantra's best friend. She has asthma. During their separation, Vedhika has an asthma attack. Mantra then saves her by passing her a spare inhaler that she keeps in her bag in case Vedhika has an asthma attack. Kayal is the one who makes them both realise this and they reconcile.

==== Vijay ====
Vijay is a rebellious, trouble-making student.

=== Cast ===
- Jaynesh as Vetri Vel
- Anand K as Mano
- Eswari Gunasagar as Kayalvizhi
- Shreedhee Sajeev as Harini
- Nishmen as Varun
- Mahalakshimi as Hema
- Thirumagal as Manthra
- Janani Devi as Vedhika
- Mohd Amin as Jeeva
- Prasad Wadarajan as Dinesh
- Sunthary as Vimala
- Mahesh as Vijayan
- Laavenya Elangovan as Akila
- Suresh Vanaz as
- Vickneswary Se as Sonia
- Sri Hari as Raaghav
- Vimala Velu
- Saranraj

=== Original soundtrack ===
==== Soundtrack ====
Tracklist
No.	Title	Length
1.	"Kodi Parakkuthu"	1:40

== Season 3 ==
Vetri
- Cover photo Vetri S3
- Starring: Jaynesh; Eswari Gunasagan; Meshanthe; Suriavelan
- No. of episodes: 47

Release
- Original network: MediaCorp Vasantham
- Original release: 27 June – 22 September 2016

Vetri S3 is a 2016 Tamil soap opera that aired on MediaCorp Vasantham from 27 June 2016 to 22 September 2016 at 10:00PM SST for 47 episodes. The show starred Jaynesh, Eswari Gunasagar, Meshanthe, Suriavelan, Manimala M and among others.

=== Cast ===
==== Main cast ====
- Jaynesh
- Eswari Gunasagan
- Meshanthe

==== Supporting cast ====
- Suriavelan
- Manimala M
- Thulasi Seda Raman
- Kaushik Iyer
- Anwar
- V. Punithan
- N. Prithiveeraj
- K. Kalaiyarasi
- Laavenya Elangovan
- Nivaashiyni Krishnan
- Nazrin Begam
- Janani Vasu
- Rubaneshwaran
- Shwn Sathiya Seelan
- Abhishek Jaya Kumar
- Satthia Nallaiah
- Suguna
- Verapandia
- Durga Lingasparan
- Sri Vatsan
- K.P Viknesh
- Vanitha Vattumalai
- Dhiraj
- Jessica Kalarani
- Ajay Philip

=== Broadcast ===
Series was released on 27 June 2016 on Mediacorp Vasantham. It aired in Malaysia on Mediacorp Vasantham, Its full length episodes and released its episodes on their app Toggle, a live TV feature was introduced on Toggle with English Subtitle.
