= Les Montagnes Bleues =

French romantic drama telefilm

- Based on: Les Montagnes Bleues by Yanne Dimay
- Written by: Paolo Barzman; Catherine Borgella; Jean-Pierre Prévost
- Directed by: Paolo Barzman
- Starring: Isabelle Renauld; Urbano Barberini; Jean-Pierre Cassel
- Country of origin: France
- Original language: French

Production
- Running time: 90 minutes (part 1); 90 minutes (part 2)
- Production companies: France 2 Lark Production; Société Française de Production

Original release
- Network: France 2
- Release: 15 March – 16 March 1999

Les Montagnes Bleues (transl. The Blue Mountains) is a 1999 French romantic drama telefilm directed by Paolo Barzman and starring Isabelle Renauld, Urbano Barberini and Jean-Pierre Cassel. The film is based on the novel of the same name by Yanne Dimay and released to mixed reviews.

== Plot ==
=== Part 1 ===
Ethnobotanist Laure Peletier is accompanied by her adopted father David in India where they meet Jean, an ethnologist at the Institute of Pondicherry. Laure came to India for a completing a botanical mission at the pharmaceutical lab but is more interested in finding her lost love, Sylvain Mazieres. She begs Jean to help her find him since he was Sylvain's friend, but Jean is depressed by the disappearance of his friend. Laure remembers how she first met Sylvain four years back in an ethnopharmacy conference in Grenoble.

=== Part 2 ===
Laure figures out that Devaki loves Sylvain and feels that she lost him. Sylvain meets Laure and is disturbed about reuniting with her. However, he faces a new danger when wood smugglers come to the plantation led by dishonest Karuna. The powerless police and corrupt administration prove to be of no help leaving Sylvain is alone with a new threat, which is also a threat to Laure's mission.

== Cast ==
- Isabelle Renauld as Laure Peletier
- Urbano Barberini as Sylvain Mazieres
- Jean-Pierre Cassel as David
- Jean Barney as Jean
- Aladin Reibel as Filou
- Gabrielle Forest as Élodie
- Hans Kaushik as Nataraj
- Krishna Devanandan as Devaki
- A. V. Dhanuskodi as Sivaraja
- Michael Muthu as Srinivas
- A. R. Vijaya Kumar as Irumalai
- Sunayana Panda Shukla as Ange-Marie
- Julien Thomast as Laboratory director

== Production ==
The film was produced in 1998.

== Release ==
Fifteen minutes of the first part was shown on Festival at 8:30 pm. The first part of the film premiered on 15 March 1999 on France 2 at 8:55 pm. The second part of the film premiered on France 2 on 16 March 1999 at 8:55 pm. The film was shown again on TV5 on 30 December 1999 at 10:15 pm and on 31 December 1999 at 1:05 am.

== Reception ==
=== Part 1 ===
A critic from Libération panned the film and wrote that "With beautiful, exotic images, India and its magnificent natural settings, superb actors (actually, no, not really). In short, Les Montagnes Bleues, a public service fiction adapted from the novel by Yanne Dimay, reeled in two 90-minute installments, does not neglect any cliché of the sentimental TV film". A critic from Télé 7 Jours wrote that "The story, lived with intensity in a superb setting, is a little long. Jean Pierre Cassel accurately portrays an adopts father who listens attentively. Isabelle Renauld shows herself determined to defend her love. Lovers of romance will rejoice".
