= Apple Chan =

Hong Kong-born Singaporean actress and singer

- 陈芷尤
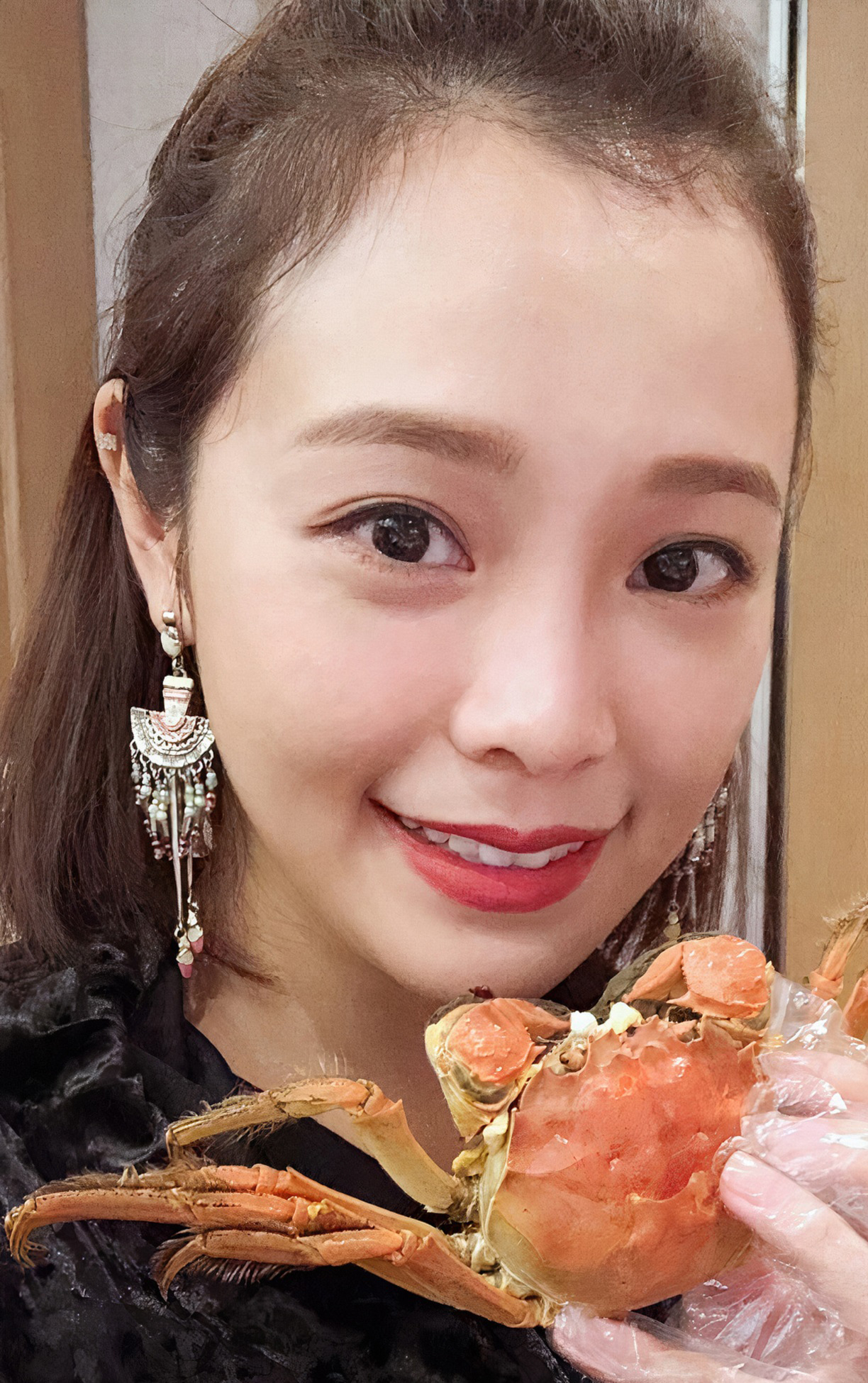
- Chan in 2018
- Born: British Hong Kong
- Education: LASALLE College of the Arts
- Occupations: Actress; singer
- Years active: 2004–present

Chinese name
- Traditional Chinese: 陳芷尤
- Simplified Chinese: 陈芷尤
Transcriptions
Standard Mandarin
- Hanyu Pinyin: Chén Zhǐyóu
Yue: Cantonese
- Jyutping: Can^{4} Zi^{2} Jau^{4}

Apple Chan Tsz Yau (Note: Chinese: 陈芷尤; Jyutping: Can^{4} Zi^{2} Jau^{4}) is a Singaporean actress and singer best known for portraying Lieutenant Zhang Xinyi in 2017 film Ah Boys to Men 4.

== Personal life ==
She grew up in Singapore and attended Guangyang Primary School, First Toa Payoh Secondary School where she was in the softball team and the National Police Cadet Corps (NPCC), receiving the Best Cadet award and also a prom queen in her year of graduation. Chan graduated from LASALLE College of the Arts, majoring in Design Communication.

She enjoys taking her two-year-old pomeranian, Soju, out hiking, for a picnic at HortPark or Singapore Botanic Gardens, and explore different pet-friendly cafes.

She previously dated Hong Kong actor Owen Cheung for three years before breaking up in 2018.

== Entrepreneurship ==
Apple Chan started a S$2.5 million endoscopy centre, Curasia, in Jurong East with her First Toa Payoh Secondary School friends. She hopes that more lives will be saved as colorectal cancer has a high survival rate if detected early.

She also runs her own skincare business Apondle.

== Filmography ==
=== Television series ===
Year	Title	Role	Notes	Ref.
2011	C.L.I.F.	Shen Meiqi	Cameo	
2012	Come Home Love	Siu Wan		
2012	No Good Either Way	Juice		
2012	Divas in Distress			
2012	Friendly Fire			
2012	Missing You			
2013	The Day of Days			
2013	Season of Love	Teenage version of Yiu Tung-nei		
2013	Reality Check			
2013	Sergeant Tabloid			
2013	A Great Way To Care II	Mable		
2013	Bullet Brain			
2013	Sniper Standoff	Pang Kei		
2013	Brother's Keeper			
2013	Will Power			
2013	Bounty Lady			
2014	The Ultimate Addiction			
2014	Ghost Dragon of Cold Mountain			
2014	Rear Mirror	Pinky		
2014	Line Walker			
2014	Tomorrow Is Another Day	Angel		
2014	Officer Geomancer	Chin Chin		
2015	Raising the Bar			
2015	Wudang Rules			
2015	The Fixer			
2015	Momentary Lapse of Reason	Teenage version of Leung Mei-lan		
2015	Under the Veil			
2016	Love as a Predatory Affair	Lau Yuk-hing		
2016	K9 Cop			
2016	Fashion War	Sandy		
2016	My Dangerous Mafia Retirement Plan			
2016	Presumed Accidents	Carol		
2016	House of Spirits	Koey		
2016	A Fist Within Four Walls	Go Yeung		
2016	Daddy Dearest			
2016	Inspector Gourmet			
2016	No Reserve			
2016	Rogue Emperor			
2017	Recipes to Live By			
2017	Tiger Mom Blues	Luk Siu-shun		
2017	Provocateur			
2017	Mind Hunter			
2017	Heart and Greed	Vera		
2017	The Taxorcist Sidequel - Chapter One			
2019	Dear Neighbours	Zhang Tingxuan		
2019	Wonder Kiss	Jin Xiangnan		
2019	True Lies	Yiwa/Meiqi		
2020	Best Friends Forever (致2020的我们)	Wang Yunxi (王芸汐)		
2021	Leave No Soul Behind (21点灵)	Wu Yuwei (Young Version) (吴羽薇（年轻）)		
2023	1943: Kappaleriya Thamizhan	Grace	Tamil Drama	

=== Variety show ===
Year	Title	Notes	Ref.
2011	Chok Chok Chok	Host	
2012	Battle of the Senses	Host	
2012	TV Funny	Guest	
2018	Happy Can Already! 4	Intern Nurse	

=== Film ===
Year	Title	Role	Notes	Ref.
2017	Ah Boys to Men 4	Lieutenant Zhang Xinyi		
2018	Wonderful! Liang Xi Mei	Younger version of Liang Xi Mei (Cameo)		
2019	Killer Not Stupid	Ira		
2022	Ah Girls Go Army	2nd Lieutenant Roxanne Tan		

== Discography ==
=== Singles ===
Year	Title	Album	Notes	Ref.
2017	Spend My Lifetime With You	Non-album single	OST for Ah Boys to Men 4	
