= Udayar =

Udayar may refer to:

  - Udayar(உடையார்), பார்க்கவ மன்னர் Originated from central Velir, linked with Cholas
- Udayar, a novel about Rajaraja_I by Balakumaran
- Title udayar (caste), used by multiple castes in India

== See also ==
- Udaya (disambiguation)
