= Chennai 2 Singapore =

2017 film by Abbas Akbar

- Theatrical release poster
- Directed by: Abbas Akbar
- Written by: Abbas Akbar
- Starring: Gokul Anand; Anju Kurian; Rajesh Balachandiran
- Cinematography: Karthick Nallamuthu
- Edited by: Praveen K. L.
- Music by: Ghibran
- Production companies: Comicbook Films; Gate Production; Media Development Authority
- Distributed by: MM2 Entertainment (Singapore)
- Release dates: 7 December 2017 (Singapore); 15 December 2017 (India)
- Countries: India; Singapore
- Language: Tamil

Chennai 2 Singapore is a 2017 Tamil-language romantic comedy film written and directed by Singaporean filmmaker Abbas Akbar in his maiden Indian feature film. Jointly produced by the Media Development Authority of Singapore along with Comicbook Films, Gate Production, Vrobal and MM2 Entertainment, as a collaboration between the Indian Tamil and Singaporean film industries, the film stars Gokul Anand, Anju Kurian, and Rajesh Balachandiran in the lead roles. In the film, a young filmmaker who leaves from Chennai to Singapore for better opportunities, loses his passport in the country and navigates with a cameraman and a girl who is suffering from cancer, leading to unexpected circumstances.

Abbas Akbar developed the script during early-2010s and narrated it to his friend and composer Ghibran, who also expressed his interest in producing the film as well. The film initially began production with Sathya and Hebah Patel in September 2014, but due to creative differences between the lead actors, the film was scrapped midway and later revived the following year, with the lead actors being recast. Principal photography took place in Chennai and Singapore, and was completed by early-2016. The cinematography was handled by Karthick Nallamuthu and editing handled by Praveen K. L.

Chennai 2 Singapore was noted for its unique promotional music launch as a cross-country road trip beginning with Chennai (India) to its final destination at Singapore, as the film's title. The film premiered at Singapore and Malaysia, on 7 and 8 December 2017, and was theatrically released in India on 15 December. The film received mixed reviews from critics.

== Plot ==
The film starts with two men expressing their gratitude in a cemetery for a person who changed their lives. The film then moves to a flashback.

The film is about a struggling Indian filmmaker, Harish (Gokul Anand), who makes his way to Singapore to look for investors to finance his dream movie. However, a series of misfortunes foils his plans, and he also ends up losing his passport. At a loss, Harish meets Vaanambadi (Rajesh Balachandiran), an eccentric Singaporean cameraman. With Vaanambaadi's advice and help, they meet a producer Michael (Shiv Keshav), who advises Harish to script a romantic film instead of a sentimental film. Without a script, Harish becomes heartbroken. But then he meets a girl Roshini (Anju Kurian), who is dying from cancer, and gets swept up in a number of hilarious but serious situations. Harish begins to script these events. He motivates Roshini not to lose heart and to stay positive. He eventually falls in love with her. Roshini's father (L. Raja) talks to Harish about her cancer and how things took a turn when it was known that she had cancer. He tells Harish that he wants a huge sum of money to cure her. Harish and Vaanambadi rob Michael by blackmailing him using his mistress.

Papablast (Emzee Jazz), a comedy don, is assigned the work of kidnapping Roshini and the duo by Michael. Papablast successfully kidnaps the trio, but unfortunately falls into his own prey, leading to the trio's escape. Harish uses the money to save Roshini, and she gets cured.

Some months later in the present, it is revealed that Harish was praying to Papablast and made a film about his own story. The film ends with the trio leaving in a car.

== Cast ==
- Gokul Anand as Harish
- Anju Kurian as Roshini
- Rajesh Balachandiran as Vaanambadi
- Shiv Keshav as Michael
- Emcee Jesz as PapaBlast
- Sumithra as Harish's mother
- L. Raja as Roshini's father
- Vijay Pranav as Kaviarasan
- M. Kannan as Financier
- Chadru as Saleem
- "Anbaana" Arun as Bhaskar
- Prem Kumar as Pazhani

== Production ==
=== Development ===
Chennai 2 Singapore marked the directorial debut of Singaporean filmmaker Abbas Akbar in his maiden Indian film. He narrated the script to musician Ghibran, whom he had befriended during the latter's visit to Singapore to study music, and Ghibran agreed to be a part of the project. On the last day when he planned to leave his native country, Akbar lost his passport which led him to stay for two months in Chennai for document verification. During the period, Akbar happened to visit the shootings and started learning about Tamil cinema. This prompted him to write a script based on his experience, regarding how a young filmmaker travelling from Chennai to Singapore ends up in various circumstances.

The project began development in 2011, when he approached Venkat Prabhu with the film's script, hoping that the director would join the film as an executive producer. However, for some reasons, Prabhu denied to be involved in the project. With no further development, Akbar secured funds from the Media Development Authority in Singapore, and also sold his house to raise funds. Ghibran also produced the film under his Comicbook Films company.

=== Casting ===
Akbar initiated talks with Dinesh to play the lead role but denied after Prabhu's disassociation from the project. Later, he narrated the script to R. Madhavan for the lead role. Though being interested, Madhavan's commitments with Irudhi Suttru (2016) refrained him from being involved in the project. He also discussed with Arya for the lead role; though, he denied being part of it, he recommended the script to his brother Sathya, who had shown initial interest and agreed to be part of the film. Hebah Patel, who was known for Thirumanam Enum Nikkah (2014) was chosen to play the female lead.

Though filming was partially completed, Akbar and Sathya had creative differences with the latter refusing to attend rehearsals. The project was scrapped and then recast with newcomers in the cast. Gokul Anand, who pursued an acting course in Singapore, was chosen to play the male lead as Ghibran, who was his senior and family friend, recommended him. Anand eventually auditioned and attended a workshop with the director before being selected for the lead role.

Rajesh Balachandran, a student from the National School of Drama in New Delhi, was chosen to play a supporting role. Balachandran recalled that Akbar wanted him to do something exaggerated and provided him books on animation to understand about the nuances. His performance in the film was considered to be "wacky and hyper active" reminiscent of Jim Carrey's character Ace Ventura. Balachandran recalled that to sustain his energy, he took plenty of nutritious drinks, due to which he had to face health problems as well. Anju Kurian, who appeared in minor roles in Neram (2013), made her debut as a female lead through this film. The film also featured numerous Indian and Singapoeran artists.

=== Filming ===
Principal photography initially began in September 2014 with Sathya and Patel as the lead role. The first schedule began in Chennai was completed within 15 days. The second schedule commenced in Singapore that October. However, though filming partially complete, it was scrapped due to creative differences between the lead actors. The film was subsequently revived with the newer cast throughout 2015 and completed by 2016. Akbar noted that, "My contribution in the movie is just 40 per cent while my wife, assistant directors and producer's complete the rest."

== Themes and influences ==
Akbar recalled that he was inspired by the classic comedy films such as Michael Madana Kama Rajan (1990) and Ullathai Allitha (1996) and made the film on the lines of a "thorough entertainer" with a fresh approach. The core plot of the film was based on the Me and Earl and the Dying Girl (2015), as it revolved a comic scene around a dying heroine, which "came out very well", according to Akbar.

== Soundtrack ==
The film's soundtrack was composed by Ghibran. The album was promoted in a unique manner, with Ghibran and Akbar travelling on a cross-country trip from Chennai to Singapore, crossing Bhutan, Myanmar, Thailand and Malaysia from 12 August–11 September 2016. All the songs were released in each country border through YouTube and other social media platforms.

== Release ==
Chennai 2 Singapore was earlier scheduled to release on 24 November 2017, but was postponed due to undisclosed releasons. The film was theatrically released first in Singapore on 7 December, followed by Malaysia on the following day, and then released across India on 15 December.

== Reception ==
M. Suganth of The Times of India wrote "The film is quite uneven; for every scene that generates a laugh or two, we get a couple that are dead weight, especially in the first half. The Chennai-set portions are frankly cringe-worthy. Even the visuals are flat, despite the setting being Singapore [...] It is only the zany music, Rajesh Balachandiran's motormouth act (which does get close to being irritating at times), and the final portions that manage to restore some amount of fun into the proceedings." Sify wrote "Chennai 2 Singapore is a whacky fun entertainer which stays true to its genre. It is one of those rare Tamil films which has many moments of pure unadulterated humour. Director Abbas Akbar takes his own sweet time to the story but what really works here is that you cannot point out a single scene which is out of the genre [...] On the downside, there are a few drop-dead dull sequences which might not evoke laughter but the overall attempt is honest. The film's extended climax doesn't feel merely convenient, but also wholly underwhelming."

Udhav Naig of The Hindu stated that, "Despite the film bordering on meaningless mostly, Chennai 2 Singapore feels strangely funny, even though the laughs aren't consistent throughout the film." Regarding the performances, Naig stated "the lead actor Gokul Anand is a good find for Tamil cinema. He is good-looking and comfortable in front of the camera. Anju Kurian as Roshini does an adequate job as the girl with cancer, while Rajesh Balachandiran's performance as Vaanambadi is, once again, part weird and part funny." Anupama Subramanian of Deccan Chronicle wrote "While touted as a rom-com, there's hardly any 'rom' in 'C2S' and only 'com' overtakes. Though the intension of the director is to make audiences laugh, he writing is inconsistent. There are many logical loopholes and the visuals are average despite shot in Singapore. The best thing about the movie is the unconventional and zappy music by Ghibran, who is also the co-producer of the movie. A film that can be enjoyed only in parts!"

Gopinath Rajendran of The New Indian Express wrote "The film does lose steam towards the end, but the wacky moments throughout the film make up for this. If the screenplay had been a bit tighter, C2S would've been an even better film. But still, the film provides many moments that will appeal, especially to the urban centres." Ashameera Aiyappan of The Indian Express wrote "The point is not all of [the] jokes work. But it feels like how it is in daily life when you have a conversation with your friends. Not all of your/their jokes work, but you move on after a moment of good-humoured mocking. The cheerful vibe isn't lost. Chennai 2 Singapore as a movie gives the same effect. No logic, but definitely lots of laughter." Ananda Vikatan rated the film 41 out of 100.
