= Udayam (TV series) =

- Cover Photo
- Tamil: உதயம்
- Genre: Reality television series
- Directed by: Vel Murugan; I. Sundar
- Presented by: Udaya Soundari
- Opening theme: Nallthorume Nallai Vazha; Lyricist; Vishnu Balaji; Singer; Suthaini; Vishnu Balaji
- Country of origin: Singapore
- Original language: Tamil
- No. of seasons: 3
- No. of episodes: 31

Production
- Producer: Lavin Selvan
- Production location: Singapore
- Editor: P. Paulmani
- Camera setup: Multi-camera
- Running time: approx. 40-42 minutes per episode

Original release
- Network: MediaCorp Vasantham
- Release: 7 September 2017 – 2020

Related
- Extreme Makeover; Extreme Makeover: Home Edition

Udayam (Tamil: உதயம்) is a Singaporean Tamil language reality makeover show produced by Lavin Selvan ( 2 seasons only ). Its first season aired on MediaCorp Vasantham from 7 September to 26 October 2017 on every Thursday at 9:00PM for 8 episodes, and its third season aired in 2020. Its initial concept is an adaptation from American reality television series Extreme Makeover: Home Edition. The show was hosted by television personality Udaya Soundari and clinched the awards for its production and host being the best info-ed series for its first 2 seasons.

== Overview ==
In seasons 1 and 2, Udaya visits 8 homes of deserving families to plan and carry out a room makeover. In season 3, the show visited hawker stalls to give them a makeover with the help of celebrity chef S. R. Bala.

== List of episodes ==
=== Season 1 ===
Episodes	Family Member	Celebrities	Telecast date
01	Samunisveri; Lalitha; Eswari	Divya	7 September 2017
02	Kadar Sultan	Suthasini	14 September 2017
03	C. Sangari	Mahalakshmi	21 September 2017
04	Sinathamby Silvalingam; Emma Jay	Gayathri	28 September 2017
05	Jayamalini	Leena	5 October 2017
06	Durga Laxmidevi; Anandan	Kokila	12 October 2017
07	Tamilarasi	Magalakshmi Sudarsan	19 October 2017
08	Ambika	Sajini	26 October 2017

== Producer ==
Lavin Selvan

== Soundtrack ==
Track list
No.	Title	Lyrics	Music	Singer(s)	Length
1.	"Nallthorume Nallai Vazha (நாள்தோறும் நாம் வாழ) Title Song"	Vishnu Balaji	Vishnu Balaji	Suthaini, Vishnu Balaji	2:00

== Broadcast ==
Series was released on 7 September 2017 on Mediacorp Vasantham. It aired in Singapore and Malaysia on Mediacorp Vasantham, Its full length episodes and released its episodes on their app Toggle, a live TV feature was introduced on Toggle with English and Tamil Subtitle.
