= Udaya Kumar (academic) =

Udaya Kumar is professor at the Centre for English Studies, JNU specializing in Joyce studies and contemporary literary and cultural theory. He is the author of The Joycean Labyrinth: Repetition, Time and Tradition in Ulysses (Oxford: Clarendon Press, 1991) and Writing the First Person: Literature, History and Autobiography in Modern Kerala (Ranikhet: Permanent Black, 2016).

He has taught various courses at University of Delhi and Jawaharlal Nehru University including a course on "Life Writings". Udaya Kumar did his Masters from University of Kerala, his M.Phil. from JNU, and D.Phil. in English Literature from St. John's College, Oxford. Before joining JNU, he was Professor of English at the University of Delhi and of Cultural Studies at the Centre for Studies in Social Sciences, Calcutta. He was also Leverhulme Visiting Professor at Newcastle University and Fellow at the Nehru Memorial Museum and Library and at the Indian Institute of Advanced Study. He has research papers on contemporary literary and cultural theory and Indian literature.

== Select bibliography ==
Books

- Writing the First Person: Literature, History and Autobiography in Modern Kerala. Ranikhet: Permanent Black, 2016.
- The Joycean Labyrinth: Repetition, Time and Tradition in Ulysses. Oxford: Clarendon Press, October 1991, rpt. 2001.

Papers

- Self, body and inner sense: Some reflections on Sree Narayana Guru and Kumaran Asan. Studies in History. 1 August 1997
- ‘The Strange Homeliness of the Night: Spectral Speech and the Dalit Present in C. Ayyappan`s Writings,’ Studies in Humanities and Social Sciences, XVII: 1 and 2 (2010, pub. 2013) pp. 177–91.
- "Consciousness, Agency and Humiliation" in The Political Philosophies of Antonio Gramsci and B. R. Ambedkar, ed. Cosimo Zene, Routledge, 2013
- ‘The Primacy of Criticism: Kuttikrishna Marar and the Normative Frames of Realism,’ The South Asian Review, special issue on South Asian Realisms and Post-realisms, vol. 32, no. 1 (2012), pp. 153–72.
- ‘Autobiography as a Way of Writing History: Personal Narratives from Kerala and the Inhabitation of Modernity’, in History in the Vernacular, eds. Partha Chatterjee and Raziuddin Aquil (Delhi: Permanent Black, 2008), pp. 418–48.
- ‘Ambivalences of Publicity: Transparency and Exposure in K. Ramakrishna Pillai’s Writings,’ The Public Sphere from Outside the West, eds. V. Sanil and Divya Dwivedi (London: Bloomsbury, 2015), pp. 79–96.
- The University and Its Outside, Vol. 51, Issue No. 11, Economic and Political Weekly, 12 Mar 2016
