= Rishi Kumaar =

Singaporean actor, musician, lyricist (born 1975)

Background information
- Born: April 30, 1975; Singapore
- Died: 24 September 2018 (age 43) Singapore
- Years active: 1996 – 2018

Rishi Kumaar (1975–2018) was a Singaporean actor, musician, lyricist, known for acting in the Vasantham drama Vettai. He was the second runner-up of Vasantham Star 2005 (Singapore Indian Idol Competition) organized by MediaCorp Vasantham.

Kumaar was a graduate from the Asian Academy Of Film & Television in Delhi. He was also well known for famous songs that were featured in "Vettai", "Planet Galatta" and many more.

== Awards ==
- 2004 - Nominee for "Best Original Composition" for I'm in love at Pradhana Vizhla 2004 (MediaCorp TV12)
- 2005 - 2nd runner-up for Vasantham Star (MediaCorp TV12)
