= Arjun Chidambaram =

Indian actor

- Born: Arjun Chidambaram; 4 January 1990 (age 36); Chennai, Tamil Nadu
- Occupation: Actor
- Years active: 2013–present
- Spouse: Jeyashri Chandrasekaran (m. 2025)

Arjun Chidambaram is an Indian actor known for his work in Tamil cinema. Emerging from Chennai’s theatre circuit, he gained wider recognition for his performance in Nerkonda Paarvai (2019), and subsequently established himself through character-driven performances in films such as Ponniyin Selvan: I (2022), Thug Life (2025) and Blast (2026). His career also spans feature films, streaming series, and theatre, including work with Evam, Stray Factory and The Madras Players.

== Career ==
Chidambaram began his acting career with an on-screen debut as the lead actor in Moone Moonu Varthai (2015), produced by S. P. B. Charan. Later in 2017, he appeared in Rum, portraying a deaf and mute hacker.

Chidambaram gained wider recognition for his portrayal of Adhik in H. Vinoth's Nerkonda Paarvai (2019), starring alongside Ajith Kumar. His character served as one of the principal antagonists in the film and was central to its themes of consent, sexual violence, and gender rights.

Arjun was then officially cast in Mani Ratnam’s historical epic Ponniyin Selvan: I (2022), based on Kalki Krishnamurthy’s novel of the same name. In the film, he portrayed Varagunan, a Pandya prince whose presence forms part of the political and dynastic conflicts surrounding the Chola empire. The role marked his entry into large-scale historical cinema and mainstream Tamil productions. In 2025, Chidambaram appeared in Mani Ratnam’s gangster drama Thug Life (2025), starring Kamal Haasan. He portrayed Khalua, a member of the film’s crime network, marking another collaboration with Mani Ratnam. The role further expanded his presence in large-scale ensemble productions.

In 2026, Chidambaram gained wider recognition with Blast (2026), a tamil action thriller directed by Subash K Raj, in which he portrayed Abraham. The role brought him greater visibility among pan-India audiences and showcased another dimension of his screen presence with an action-driven ensemble. Starring alongside Arjun Sarja and Abhirami, the film marked another significant step in Chidambaram's growing body of work in Tamil Cinema.

== Filmography ==
=== Films ===
Year	Film	Role	Notes
2015	Moone Moonu Varthai	Arjun	Debut film
2017	Rum	Kural	
2019	Nerkonda Paarvai	Adhik	
2019	Enai Noki Paayum Thota	Police officer	Uncredited
2020	Theeviram	Ismail	
2022	Ponniyin Selvan: I	Varagunan	
2023	Aneethi	Ajee	
2023	Kolai	Arjun	
2023	Raththam	Shyam Sunder	
2025	Thug Life	Kahlua	
2026	Blast	Abraham	
2026	Baththa	Jyothi	

=== Web series ===
Year	Title	Role(s)	Platform	Notes
2018	America Mappillai	Ganesh	ZEE5	
2019	Auto Shankar	Inspector Kathiravan	ZEE5	
2019	Behind Closed Doors	Prashanth	VIU	
2020	Addham	Ajith	Aha	Telugu series Segment: "The Unwhisperable Secret".
2023	The Village	Prakash	Amazon Prime Video	
2026	#Love	Harish	Netflix	

=== Dubbing artist ===
Year	Film	Actor	Ref(s)
2021	Doctor	Milind Soman	
2026	Project Hail Mary	Ryan Gosling	
