= Amzath Khan =

Indian film actor

- Born: 22 September 1983 (age 43); Salem, Tamil Nadu
- Occupation: Actor
- Years active: 2010-Present
- Spouse: Rasheda Khan

Amzath Khan is an Indian actor, who is known and famous for acting in Maya (2015) and Kaithi (2019).

== Career ==
Seeking a career in media, Amzath pursued an MBA in film marketing and finance and briefly worked at Sony Pictures and then as the marketing head at an FM station - Radio One. He joined the theatre company, Stray Factory, hoping to get a breakthrough in films and worked on the film Pugaippadam (2010), which had a low-key release. He subsequently continued acting in short films made for the reality show, Naalaiya Iyakkunar. After a spell away from films, he successfully auditioned for the role of basketball player Guna in Arivazhagan Venkatachalam's sports drama, Vallinam (2015). The film won positive reviews from critics and performed averagely at the box office, though Amzath's performance was well-received, prompting further film offers. He starred in the horror film Rum (2017).

== Filmography ==
=== Film ===
Year	Film	Role	Notes
2010	Pugaippadam	Krishna	
2014	Vallinam	Guna	
2015	Maya	Ram	
2016	Natpathigaram 79	Aravind	
2016	Kalam	Gautham	
2017	Rum	Nepali	
2019	Igloo	Shiva	
2019	Kaithi	Ram	
2020	Theeviram	Masood	
2022	Ponniyin Selvan: I	Mazhavarayar	
2023	Ponniyin Selvan: II	Mazhavarayar	
2023	Theera Kaadhal	Prakash	

=== Television ===
Year	Show	Role	Channel
2019	Aayutha Ezhuthu	Sakthivel	Vijay TV
2021	Survivor Tamil	Participant	Zee Tamil
