= Janani D/O Madhavan =

- Season 1
- Also known as: Janani
- Genre: Soap opera
- Written by: Jaya Rathakrishnan
- Directed by: Jaya Rathakrishnan
- Starring: Shabir; Sanchala; Rishi Kumar
- Country of origin: Singapore
- Original language: Tamil
- No. of episodes: 17 (season 1); 13 (season 2)

Production
- Producer: Divya Anjan
- Editor: A.B.R. Pupathy
- Camera setup: Multi-camera
- Running time: approx. 22–24 minutes per episode

Original release
- Network: MediaCorp Vasantham
- Release: 11 July 2014 – 31 March 2017

Janani D/O Madhavan is a Singaporean Tamil-language soap opera that aired on MediaCorp Vasantham from 11 July 2014 to 31 October 2014 for 17 episodes. The show starred Shabir and Sanchala. It was produced by Divya Anjan and was directed and written by Jaya Rathakrishnanby.

== Cast ==
=== Main ===
- Shabir as Madhavan
- Sanchala as Janani
- Rishi Kumar as Mr. K. Cho

=== Recurring ===
- Muzammil Elias Mikhail
- Meenaksh
- Lakshna Lakshmi
- Kayalvily
- Janani Rajalingam
- Jagan Chandromohan
- Bharathi Rani Arunachalam
- Bhama Nair
- Balraj Devandran
- Mahesh (in season 2 as a passerby; guest appearance)
- Jasmin Michael (Special appearance for "Nila Thoonguthu" song)

=== Season 2 ===
- Kokila as Granny
- Muzammil as Munesh
- Bhama Nair as Shami

==== Children cast ====
- Yogeshwari Preshant
- Aayanaa
- Katijah
- Ganga Kannan
- Aishwarya
- Avighnaa Kaavery
- Kamallesh Veeraa
- Anbu Navin
- Avineesh

== Seasons overview ==
Season	Episodes	Originally aired (Singapore dates)		Time
Season	Episodes	First aired	Last aired	Time
1	17	11 July 2014	31 October 2014	Friday 8:00PM
2	13	1 January 2017	31 March 2017	Friday 8:00PM

== Original soundtrack ==
It was written by Shabir, composed by Shabir. It was sung by Shabir. The music was produced by Buvaneshwaran and Kenneth Yong and the background score by Ameale.

=== Soundtrack ===
Season 1

Track listing
No.	Title	Lyrics	Singer(s)	Length
1.	"I Know Right"	Shabir	Shabir; Sanchala	1:40
2.	"Nila Thoonguthu"	Shabir	Shabir	6:04
3.	"Robba Ribba"	Shabir	Shabir

Season 2

Season 2

Track listing
No.	Title	Lyrics	Singer(s)	Length
1.	"Yaarai Irunthal Enna (யாராக இருந்தால் என்ன)"	Shabir	Shabir

== Episodes ==
Season 2

Episode	Title	Directed by	Written by	Date of Broadcast
1	"1: Janani can save Janani"	Jaya Rathakrishnan	Jaya Rathakrishnan	6 January 2017
Everything goes wrong on Janani's first day of Primary Six. At this rate, only Janani can save Janani!
2	"2:"	Jaya Rathakrishnan	Jaya Rathakrishnan	13 January 2017
Janani gets reprimanded by her form teacher and sets out to redeem herself. Meanwhile, Madhavan ponders over a decision that could potentially affect him and his family.
3	"3:"	Jaya Rathakrishnan	Jaya Rathakrishnan	20 January 2017
Poor Miss Oviya gets hit by the flu bug, but everyone wants a day off except her.
4	"4:"	Jaya Rathakrishnan	Jaya Rathakrishnan	27 January 2017
Janani goes the extra mile to pursue an unusual angle for her first ever E-News publication while Miss Oviya finds herself in trouble with the law!
5	"5:"	Jaya Rathakrishnan	Jaya Rathakrishnan	3 February 2017
Madhavan faces a new test when something sparks a change in Janani's behaviour. Will the father-daughter team overcome their new hurdle?
6	"6: Valentine's Day?"	Jaya Rathakrishnan	Jaya Rathakrishnan	10 February 2017
Janani and her squad try their best to bring two long-lost friends together. Will they succeed in time for Valentine's Day?
7	"7:"	Jaya Rathakrishnan	Jaya Rathakrishnan	17 February 2017
The future looks bright for Janani while the odds are stacked against Munesh. Can he turn the tables around in time?
8	"8:"	Jaya Rathakrishnan	Jaya Rathakrishnan	24 February 2017
Surprise surprise! Madhavan has to restore order at home with an unexpected addition to the household, but just who is this person?
9	"9:"	Jaya Rathakrishnan	Jaya Rathakrishnan	3 March 2017
A Thirukural competition puts Janani's friendship with Sharmi to the test. Can the best-friend duo practice what they preach? Recite the Kurals with Janani and Sharmi!
10	"10:"	Jaya Rathakrishnan	Jaya Rathakrishnan	10 March 2017
Janani and Santhosham are forced to activate damage control when a social media rant spirals out of control!
11	"11:"	Jaya Rathakrishnan	Jaya Rathakrishnan	17 March 2017
Crunch time in school sees Janani shut out her family and friends while dealing with the pressure of her academics, can she single-handedly shake off the PSLE jitters?
12	"12:"	Jaya Rathakrishnan	Jaya Rathakrishnan	24 March 2017
With confidence out of sight and the PSLE examinations just around the corner, Janani spends some time with her school counsellor.
13	"13:"	Jaya Rathakrishnan	Jaya Rathakrishnan	31 March 2017
Madhavan comes up with the perfect plan to teach his crestfallen daughter a meaningful lesson on living and healing with a little faith, trust and pixie dust!

== Broadcast ==
Series was released on 11 July 2014 on Mediacorp Vasantham. It aired in Malaysia on Mediacorp Vasantham, Its full length episodes and released its episodes on their app Toggle, a live TV feature was introduced on Toggle with English Subtitle.
