= Gokul Anand =

Indian actor

- Born: Kerala, India
- Occupation: Actor
- Years active: 2015–present
- Known for: Chennai 2 Singapore (2017)
- Spouse: Madhu Shalini (m. 2022)

Gokul Anand is an Indian actor who works in Malayalam and Tamil-language stage plays, films and web series. He debuted as a lead actor with the Tamil movie, Chennai 2 Singapore (2017).

== Career ==
As a child, he acted in Malayalam-language television shows, before joining the television group, The Boardwalkers. In a review of Micheal Muthu's stage play An Idiot for Dinner, a critic wrote that "Gokul Anand, as the frustrated Sanjay Kelavkar, put on a grand show which went above and beyond as his eyes glazed over in pain and anguish painted his face due to the antics of Gopu". He also starred in the play Moulin Rouge. He auditioned for several films before meeting M. Ghibran who told him about the film Chennai 2 Singapore. In a review of Chennai 2 Singapore by The Hindu, a critic noted that "Besides the film’s at-times-enjoyable treatment, the lead actor Gokul Anand is a good find for Tamil cinema. He is good-looking and comfortable in front of the camera".

== Personal life ==
Gokul Anand married Telugu film actress Madhu Shalini on June 16, 2022, at the Taj Hotel in Hyderabad.

== Filmography ==
=== Films ===
Year	Title	Role	Notes
2015	Maalai Nerathu Mayakkam	Manas	
2017	Chennai 2 Singapore	Harish	
2019	Pancharaaksharam	Aidhan	
2020	Theeviram	Abbas	
2021	Thittam Irandu	Kishore	
2021	Naduvan	Shiva	
2022	Jack N' Jill	Joseph	Malayalam film
2022	Captain	Vikram	

=== Web series ===
Year	Series	Role	Notes
2018	America Mappillai	Karthik	ZEE5
2018	Door No. 403	Saga	
2020	Topless	Straight	ZEE5
