= Vannathirai =

- Country: Singapore
- Broadcast area: Singapore
- Headquarters: Singapore

Programming
- Picture format: 480i (SDTV)

History
- Launched: 24 September 2008; 17 years ago

Links
- Website: fb.com/Vannathirai

Vannathirai (VTV) is a 24-hour Tamil movie channel that includes live talks with hosts and Singaporean celebrities. Launched on 24 September 2008 and broadcast in Singapore through cable television, it is suitable for all age groups as it screens films from the 1960s to the latest releases in 2019.

As a popular Tamil media, the channel is known among Singaporeans for broadcasting various classic hit movies and blockbusters.

== Programmes ==
The channel has carried a variety of original productions since its inception.

- Hello V Live
- Kalyana Mela
- Neengal Kettavai
- Start Camera Action
