= Uday =

Uday or Odai is a masculine name in Arabic as well as several Indian languages. In numerous Indian languages, including Hindi, Bengali, Gujarati, Tamil, Telugu and others, it means 'dawn' or 'rise'. The Arabic name (عدي) means 'runner' or 'rising'.

== List of people ==
- Uday Benegal, Indian musician
- Uday Chopra, Bollywood actor
- Uday Hussein, Iraqi politician and businessman
- Oday Jafal, Syrian footballer
- Uday Kiran, Indian film actor
- Uday Kotak, Indian businessman
- Uday Merchant, Indian cricketer
- Uday Nagaraju, Indian-born British politician
- Ouday Raad, Lebanese actor and voice actor
- Oday Rasheed, Iraqi film director
- Uday Pratap Singh, Indian politician
- Odai Al-Saify, Jordanian footballer
- Uday Shankar, Indian choreographer
- Udai Singh, Indian royalty
- Udayveer Singh, neet aspirant
- Uday Singh (Fiji politician), Indo-Fijian politician
- Oday Taleb, Iraqi footballer
- Udhayanidhi Stalin, Indian-Tamil politician, ex-Deputy CM of Tamil Nadu.

== See also ==
- Euday L. Bowman, American composer
- Uday (river), Ukraine
- Uday Foundation, a non-profit organization based in New Delhi
- Ujwal DISCOM Assurance Yojana, a Government of India scheme
