= Pradhana Vizha =

- Current: Pradhana Vizha 2014
- Pradhana Vizha 2014 Logo
- Awarded for: Excellence in Singapore Tamil Entertainment
- Country: Singapore
- Presented by: MediaCorp
- First award: 1996
- Website: Pradhana Vizha

Television/radio coverage
- Network: MediaCorp Vasantham; MediaCorp TV12 Central

Pradhana Vizha is a television award ceremony held in Singapore by MediaCorp Vasantham. It was started to honour rapidly growing Tamil television artists on Mediacorp Vasantham.

== History ==
Pradhana Vizha first started in 1996 as "Prime 12 Awards" to honor both Malay and Indian artistes, it was later separated into two different award ceremonies. Since then the growth of local Indian television and artistes has helped cultivate Pradhana Vizha, making it a full-fledged annual awards ceremony by 2000, just to coincide with the relaunch of Central with one of its timebelts, Vasantham Central.

== Award and winners ==
=== 2009-2012 ===
Year	Best Actor	Best Actress	Best Host	Best Drama	Best Variety Programme	Best Info-Ed/Infotainment Programme:
2009	Mohan; Avargal	Manimala; Mudivu	Vishnu; Yennai Konjum Maatri	Manam Sr-2	Dhil Dare Devils	Vasantham Payanam
2010	Puravalan	Josephine	Elamaran	Rehai -Season 2	Pradhana Vizha 2009	Uthavikku Varalaama
2011	Shabir; Vettai : Pledged to Hunt	Kokhila; Vyjayanthi	Saravanan Ayyavoo; Amarkala Deepavali	Vettai : Pledged to Hunt and Vyjayanthi	Amarkala Deepavali 2010	No Award
2012	Vadivazhagan; Thiruvalluvan	Nithiya Rao; Nijangal Sr 2	Puravalan(Info-Ed); Uzhaikkum Karangal; Vadivazhagan (Variety); Enna Nadakudhu Sr 2	Nijangal Sr 2	Galatta Enna Nadakudhu Sr 2	Vizhigal Sr 4
2025		Nithiya Rao Kanne Kaniamudhe				

== See also ==
- List of Asian television awards
