= Shabir Sulthan =

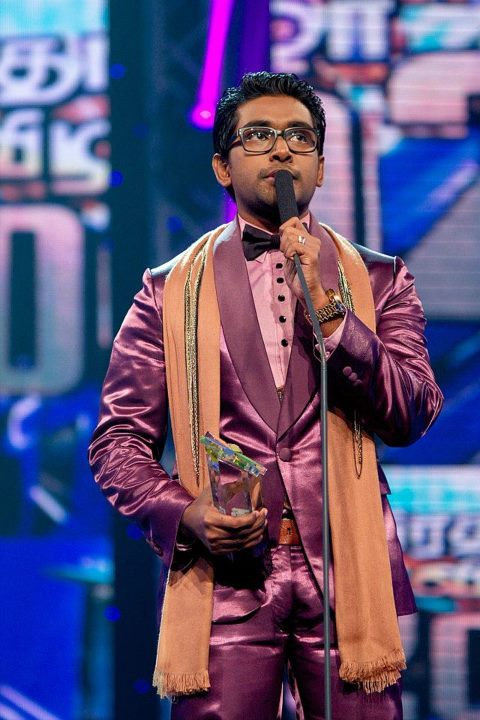
- Shabir winning award 2012

Background information
- Born: Shabir Tabare Alam; Singapore
- Genres: Indiepop, Film Score, World, Rock, Folk
- Occupations: Music producer, composer, arranger, songwriter, vocalist, lyricist, actor
- Instruments: Synth, harmonium, keyboards, guitar, vocals
- Years active: 2005–present
- Labels: Shabir Music, Think Music India, Sony Music India
- Website: shabirmusic.com

Shabir Tabare Alam, known professionally as Shabir Sulthan, is a Singaporean singer-songwriter, record producer, music composer, and performer. Most of his lyrics are in Tamil.

He won the inaugural singing competition Vasantham Star 2005, hosted by MediaCorp Vasantham TV Channel. His Yaayum song from the film Sagaa was a sleeper hit in India and around the world.

After performing in the 2007 National Day Parade, Shabir noted there weren’t many songs performed in Tamil. He composed "Singai Naadu", a Tamil song for the 2012 National Day Parade. Former Singapore Prime Minister, Lee Hsien Loong, praised the song, and Shabir won the Singapore Youth Award, the national honour the Singapore government gives young achievers.

Shabir has starred in several Eaglevision Mediacorp and Wei Yu Films TV series. He played the lead role of Nantha, the anti-hero, in Vettai, which translates to "The Hunt.” It premiered in 2010, with wide viewership across Singapore and Malaysia. In 2011, Shabir won Best Actor in the Pradhana Vizha Awards for his performance.

Shabir played Vettaiyan in Naam 2, a sequel to the hit series, Naam. He also played Major Habibullah Khan, a former war hero, in a period drama This Land Is Mine. He was nominated for Best Supporting Actor for this role at the Asian Television Awards.

== Personal life ==
Shabir was born in Singapore. His father is from Tiruvannamalai, Tamil Nadu, and speaks Urdu/Tamil. His mother speaks Malay/Tamil. Shabir composed his first song at the age of 12.

== Career ==
Shabir started composing when he was 12 years old. Self-taught on the keyboard, he studied Hindustani Classical Music, learning the violin from Sri Veereshwar Madhri and guitar from Steeve Vatz. Shabir ultimately received a bachelor's degree in music production and composition.

Shabir is a leading recording artist in Singapore, and he has released three albums: Alaipayuthey, TraffiQ, and Swasam-Scents of Prose. His music has various influences, including music pop, indie, alternative rock, and world music. His lyrics include wordplay, metaphor, and experiments with cadence. His early metal and rock favorites, such as Rage Against The Machine and Metallica, have influenced his vocal style.

Film Music

Sagaa was Shabir’s debut as a film composer, and the score received critical praise. The film's lead single, "Yaayum,” was a hit on release, receiving critical and fan acclaim. Yaayum has had over 124 million YouTube views and over 13 million Spotify streams. Shabir is the only Singaporean who scores movies in India.

Independent Music

Shabir is a prime leader of the international Tamil music movement. His first album, "Alaipayuthey,” was released in 2005. His next album, TraffiQ (Dejavu & Nagaravaytai), was regularly played on local and international channels, including MTV Asia and Channel V, and increased his exposure throughout South East Asia.

"Swasam – Scents of Prose" produced by High Breed Media, was released on 7 April 2012. The album combined various musical styles and features poetry recitations by prominent Singaporeans, including the nation's 6th President, S.R Nathan, Minister S Iswaran, former NMP Viswa Sadasivan, and others.

== Controversy ==
Shabir won the inaugural Vasantham Star competition in 2005, but some controversy surrounded it.

His initial performances received mixed reviews, with focus on his pronunciation and use of slang. He made it through the quarter-finals, but lost in the semifinals, angering many fans. A petition signed by over 500 people was submitted to the producers, who created a wild card entry that allowed Shabir back into the competition and his win.

In 2021, Shabir performs and sing the National Day Parade theme song "The Road Ahead", together with fellow Singaporean singers Linying, Sezairi and Shye Ann Brown.

In 2024, Shabir performs "Majulah Singapura" at the National Day Parade.

== Discography ==
=== As Playback Singer ===
Year	Title	Language	Song
2013	Vathikuchi	Tamil	Singer-Songwriter for "Amma Wake Me Up" & "Ari Unnai"
2013	Pranam Kosam	Telugu	Singer for Erugara
2014	Arima Nambi	Tamil	Singer for "Yaaro Yaar Aval"
2016	Babu Bangaram	Telugu	Singer-Songwriter for Babu Bangaram Theme
2019	Kadaram Kondan	Tamil	Singer & Rap Lyrics of Kadaram Kondan song written by Shabir
2019	Nenjamundu Nermaiyundu Odu Raja	Tamil	Singer for "Nenjamundu"
2021	Maara	Tamil	Singer & Lyricist for "Pagada"
2022	Aalambana	Tamil	Singer for "Oorukulla Pudusa"
2023	Thunivu	Tamil	Singer-Songwriter & Lyricist for "Gangstaa"

=== As Film Composer ===
Year	Title	Language	Notes
2017	Together Apart, The Manifest	English	
2017	Sangu Chakkaram	Tamil	
2019	Sagaa	Tamil	
2019	Neeya 2	Tamil	
2019	Dhilluku Dhuddu 2	Tamil	
2019	Nenjamundu Nermaiyundu Odu Raja	Tamil	
2019	Raju Gari Gadhi 3	Telugu	Remake of Dhilluku Dhuddu 2
2021	Maafkan Mak	Malay	

== Filmography ==
Year	Title	Role	Notes
2011	Vettai	Nantha	Won Best Actor in the Pradhana Vizha Awards 2011
2021	This Land Is Mine	Major Habibullah Khan	Nominated at the Asian Television Awards for Best Supporting Actor
2022	Naam 2	Vettaiyan	

== Awards ==
- Vasantham Star 2005 (Winner)
- Derana TV Awards Best Music Video for Nagara Vaytei by Shabir ft Dinesh K & Ramya 2009 (Winner)
- Pradhana Vizha 2011 Best Actor (Winner)
- Singapore Indian Artistes Association (Honored Best Actor) 2011
- Pradhana Vizha 2012 Most Popular Song (Winner)
- Kannadasan Award 2012 by Association of Singapore Tamil Writers (Winner)
- Edison Awards 2013 Best International Singer (Winner)
- Highly Commended Award for Kshatriyan soundtrack at Asian Television Awards 2016
- Pradhana Vizha 2016 Best Soundtrack (Won for Nee Indru Kshatriyan)
- Singapore Youth Award 2017
- Artistic Excellence Award 2022 by COMPASS
- Best Original Song for an Asian TV programme or Movie 2022 by ContentAsia Award
- Best Original Track Award for "Vettai" by Pradhana Vizhna 2022
