= List of Tamil-language streaming television series =

This is a list of Tamil language streaming television series produced in India that have been released.

== List of television series by year ==
=== 2017 ===
Opening		Title	Director	Cast	Platform	Ref
April	30	Maya Thirrai	Kaushik Narasimhan	Nandha Durairaj, Eden Kuriakose, Lakshmi Priyaa Chandramouli	ALT Balaji	
June	16	As I'm Suffering From Kadhal	Balaji Mohan	Sunder Ramu, Sananth, Sanchana Natarajan	Disney+ Hotstar	

=== 2018 ===
Opening		Title	Director	Cast	Platform	Ref
February	14	America Mappillai	Praveen Padmanabhan	Raja Krishnamoorthy, Leela Samson, Arjun Chidambaram	ZEE5	
July	24	Nila Nila Odi Vaa	Nandhini J. S.	Ashwin Kakumanu, Sunaina, Anupama Kumar	Viu	
July	29	Kallachirippu	Rohit Nandakumar	Amrutha Srinivasan, Vikas, Vignesh Shanmugam	ZEE5	
November	22	Alarm	Kaushik	Prem Kumar, Girija, Anjali Rao	ZEE5	
December	7	Vella Raja	Guhan Senniappan	Bobby Simha, Parvatii Nair, Gayathrie	Amazon Prime Video	
December	13	What's Up Velakkari	Preethi Srivijayan, Manu Anand	Dhanya Balakrishna, Rakendu Mouli, Abhirami Venkatachalam	ZEE5	

=== 2019 ===
Opening		Title	Director	Cast	Platform	Ref
January	23	Mitta	Pradeep	Lallu, Sathu, Shira Gaarg	ZEE5	
February	6	D7	Ganesh Vinayak	Sachin, Iswarya, Meenakshi Govindarajan	ZEE5	
March	13	F*ck Buddies	Jikki Nair	Jikki Nair, Jaytesh Calpakkam, Arjun	MX Player	
April	23	Auto Shankar	Ranga Yali	Appani Sarath, Swayam Siddha, Arjun Chidambaram	ZEE5	
May	21	Thiravam	Arvind Krishna	Prasanna, Indhuja Ravichandran, Kaali Venkat	ZEE5	
June	17	Postman	Prashanth Gunasekaran	Munishkanth, Keerthi Pandian	ZEE5	
August	21	Fingertip	S. Shivakar	Akshara Haasan, Ashwin Kakumanu, Sunaina	ZEE5	
September	29	Iru Dhuruvam	M. Kumaran	Nandha Durairaj, Abhirami Venkatachalam, Abdool	SonyLIV	
October	18	Nisha	Karthik Rajan	Anish Padmanabhan, Vaibhavi Shandilya, Kalloori Vinoth	ZEE5	
November	8	Police Diary 2.0	Five directors (Note: A series with five different directors: Shiva Ganesh, Pa. Rajaganeshan, Danush, R Pavan, Ramesh Bharathi and Vikraman)	Santhosh Prathap, John Kokken, Anjana Jayaprakash	ZEE5	
December	5	Karoline Kamakshi	Vivek Kumar Kannan	Meena, Giorgia Andriani, Balaji Murugadoss	ZEE5	
December	11	Queen	Gautham Vasudev Menon, Prasath Murugesan	Ramya Krishnan, Anjana Jayaprakash, Anikha Surendran	MX Player	

=== 2020 ===
Opening		Title	Director	Cast	Platform	Ref
February	1	Topless	Dinesh Mohan	Guru Somasundaram, Gokul Anand, Bazak Gaziler Prasad	ZEE5	
March	13	Kannamoochi	Avinaash Hariharan	Poorna, Amzath Khan, Vivek Prasanna	ZEE5	
September	18	Time Enna Boss!?	Subu	Bharath, Priya Bhavani Shankar, Sanjana Sarathy	Amazon Prime Video	
October	30	Thanthu Vitten Ennai	Rajeev K. Prasad	Ashwin Kumar Lakshmikanthan, Haripriya Isai	ZEE5	
October	30	Mugilan	Sri Ram Ram	Karthik Raj, Ramya Pandian, Gayatri Rema	ZEE5	
November	28	PubGoa	Lakshmi Narayana	Vimala Raman, Dev, Sampath Ram, Sara Annaih	ZEE5	
December	11	Triples	Charukesh Sekar	Jai, Vani Bhojan, Madhuri Jain	Disney+ Hotstar	
December	18	Paava Kadhaigal	Four directors (Note: An anthology series with four different directors: Sudha Kongara, Vignesh Shivan, Gautham Menon, Vetrimaaran)	Kalidas Jayaram, Anjali, Sai Pallavi, Simran	Netflix India	
December	22	Singa Penne	R. Pavan	Arnaav, Paayal Radhakrishna, Udhaya	ZEE5	

=== 2021 ===
Opening		Title	Director	Cast	Platform	Ref
January	22	Kuruthi Kalam	P. Rajapandi, Danush	Santhosh Prathap, Sanam Shetty, Vincent Asokan	MX Player	
February	12	Live Telecast	Venkat Prabhu	Kajal Aggarwal, Vaibhav Reddy, Anandhi	Disney+ Hotstar	
February	12	Vadham	Venkatesh Babu	Sruthi Hariharan, Ashwathy Warrier, Vivek Rajgopal	MX Player	
May	20	November Story	Indhra Subramanian	Tamannaah, Pasupathy, G. M. Kumar	Disney+ Hotstar	
August	6	Navarasa	Nine directors (Note: An anthology series with nine different directors: Priyadarshan, Vasanth, Gautham Vasudev Menon, Bejoy Nambiar, Karthik Subbaraj, Sarjun KM, Karthick Naren, Arvind Swami, Rathindran R. Prasad)	Suriya, Vijay Sethupathi, Arvind Swami	Netflix India	

=== 2022 ===
Opening		Title	Director	Cast	Platform	Ref
January	14	Putham Pudhu Kaalai Vidiyaadhaa	Five directors (Note: An anthology series with five different directors: Balaji Mohan, Halitha Shameem, Madhumitha, Surya Krishna, and Richard Anthony)	Lijomol Jose, Nadhiya, Sananth, Aishwarya Lekshmi	Amazon Prime Video	
January	14	Aanandham Aarambham	Jagan	Santhosh Prathap, Abhirami Venkatachalam	Disney+ Hotstar	
February	11	Akash Vaani	Enoc Able	Kavin, Reba Monica John, Sharath Ravi	Aha	
February	18	Irai	Rajesh M. Selva	Sarathkumar, Nizhalgal Ravi, Abhishek Shankar	Aha	
February	18	Vilangu	Prasanth Pandiyaraj	Vimal, Ineya, Bala Saravanan	ZEE5	
March	4	Ramany vs Ramany 3.0	Naga	Ramji, Vasuki Anand, Ponni Suresh	Aha Tamil	
April	22	Anantham	V. Priya	Prakash Raj, Sampath Raj, Vivek Prasanna	ZEE5	
April	22	Kana Kaanum Kaalangal	Jaswini J.	Teja Venkatesh, Raja Vetri Prabhu, Aravind Seiju	Disney+ Hotstar	
May	21	Kuthukku Pathu	Vijay Varadharaj	Aadukalam Naren, Vijay Varadharaj, Bose Venkat	Aha	
June	17	Ammuchi 2	Rajeshwar Kalisamy	Arun Kumar, Prasanna Balachandran	Aha	
June	17	Fingertip 2	S. Shivakar	Prasanna, Regina Cassandra, Aparna Balamurali	ZEE5	
June	17	Suzhal: The Vortex	Bramma G, Anucharan	Kathir, Aishwarya Rajesh, R. Parthiban	Amazon Prime Video	
July	22	Meme Boys	Arun Koushik	Aadithya Bhaskar, Namritha, Jayanth	SonyLIV	
July	29	Paper Rocket	Kiruthiga Udhayanidhi	Kalidas Jayaram, Tanya Ravichandran	ZEE5	
August	5	Victim: Who Is Next?	Four directors (Note: An anthology series with four different directors: Chimbudevan, M. Rajesh, Pa. Ranjith, Venkat Prabhu)	Amala Paul, Kalaiyarasan, Nassar, Natty	SonyLIV	
August	12	Emoji	Sen S Rangasamy	Mahat Raghavendra, Devika Satheesh, Manasa Chowdary	Aha	
August	19	Tamil Rockerz	Arivazhagan Venkatachalam	Arun Vijay, Vani Bhojan, Iswarya Menon	SonyLIV	
September	30	Mad Company	Vignesh Vijaykumar	Prasanna, Dhanya Balakrishna, Kaniha	Aha	
October	21	Pettaikaali	Rajkumar	Kalaiyarasan, Kishore, Sheela Rajkumar	Aha	
November	4	Kaiyum Kalavum	Roju	Sanchana Natarajan, Madonna Sebastian, Rohit	SonyLIV	
November	18	Five Six Seven Eight	A. L. Vijay	Ditya Bhande, Nagendra Prasad, Chinni Prakash	ZEE5	
December	2	Vadhandhi	Andrew Louis	S. J. Suryah, Laila, Nassar	Amazon Prime Video	
December	9	Fall	Siddharth Ramaswamy	Anjali, Santhosh Prathap	Disney+ Hotstar	

=== 2023 ===
Opening		Title	Director	Cast	Platform	Ref					
January	6	Story of Things	George K. Antoney	Bharath, Ritika Singh, Aditi Balan	SonyLIV						
January	26	Ayali	Muthukumar	Abi Nakshatra, Anumol, Madhan	ZEE5						
January	27	Engga Hostel	Sathish Chandrasekaran	Sacchin, Avinaash, Samyuktha Viswanathan	Amazon Prime Video						
February	11	Iru Dhuruvam 2	Arun Prakash	Prasanna, Nandha Durairaj, Abhirami Venkatachalam	SonyLIV						
February	28	Maaya Thotta	Nandhakumar Raju	Amit Bhargav, Chaitra Reddy, Kumaran Thangarajan	Hungama						
March	10	Accidental Farmer & Co	Sugen Jay	Vaibhav, Ramya Pandian, Badava Gopi	SonyLIV						
March	24	Sengalam	S. R. Prabhakaran	Vani Bhojan, Kalaiyarasan, Sharath Lohithaswa	ZEE5						
April	21	Oru Kodai Murder Mystery	Vishal Venkat	Abhirami, Aakash, John Jude Kennedy	ZEE5						
May	18	Modern Love Chennai	Five directors	Ashok Selvan, Ritu Varma, Kishore	Amazon Prime Video						
July	6	Sweet Kaaram Coffee	Bejoy Nambiar	Lakshmi, Madhoo, Santhy Balachandran	Amazon Prime Video						
August	10	Vera Maari Office	Chidambaram	Vishnu, RJ Sarithiran, Janani Ashokkumar	Aha						
August	12	Mathagam	Prasath Murugesan	Atharvaa, K. Manikandan, Gautham Vasudev Menon	Disney+ Hotstar						
August	25	En Ethire Rendu Papa	N. Rajkumar	Shariq Hassan, Sakshi Agarwal, Manisha Jashnani	Hungama						
September	15	MY3	M. Rajesh	Hansika Motwani, Shanthanu Bhagyaraj, Mugen Rao	Disney+ Hotstar						
November	10	Label	Arunraja Kamaraj	Jai, Tanya Hope, Mahendran	Disney+ Hotstar						
November	24	The Village	Milind Rau	Arya, Divya Pillai, John Kokken	Amazon Prime Video		24	The Village part	Milind Rau	Arya, Divya Pillai, John Kokken	Amazon Prime Video
