= Diya Menon =

Indian television host

- Born: 27 December 1992 (age 33); Ottapalam, Kerala, India
- Other name: Krazy Kanmani
- Citizenship: India
- Occupations: actress, television host
- Spouse: Karthik Subramanian (m. 2016)
- Children: 1
- Parents: Muralidharan Menon (father); Sindhu Muralidharan Menon (mother)
- Relatives: Dheepthi Kapil (elder sister)

Diya Menon (born 27 December 1992), also known as VJ Diya, is an Indian actress, television presenter and video jockey. She primarily works in Tamil and Malayalam-language television. Since 2013, she has hosted various award functions and programs with the Sun Network. She became known as a video jockey on Sun Music, hosting shows such as Krazy Kanmani, Call Mela Kasu, Savaale Samali, Super Challenge and Vanakkam Tamizha. In addition to her television career, Diya has hosted stage shows, corporate events and cultural programs in India and abroad, including events in Europe.

== Early life ==
Diya Menon was born on 27 December 1992 in Ottapalam, Kerala, India, to Muralidharan Menon and Sindhu Muralidharan Menon. She has an elder sister, Dheepthi Kapil, who is also a television actress.

She completed her primary education at Mrs. Bullmore School in Coonoor, Tamil Nadu, before her family relocated to Coimbatore. She completed her secondary schooling at Sri Nehru Vidyalaya, Coimbatore, graduating in 2010. She later pursued a Bachelor of Business Management degree at Sri Krishna Arts and Science College, Coimbatore, followed by a postgraduate degree in International Business.

== Career ==
Diya Menon started her career in 2015 appearing as a television host in the challenge-competition show Super Challenge hosting the show alongside other anchors Deepak Dinkar, Rishi, Aadhavan and Kavitha. She also hosted shows on Sun Music such as Krazy Kanmani, Suda Suda Chennai and Call Mela Kasu.

== Personal life ==
Diya Menon married Karthik Subramanian, a cricketer on a Singapore state-level team. Diya and Karthik were in a three-year relationship before they were married. On 20 August 2022, Diya gave birth to a baby girl.

== Television ==
| Shows / Series | Role |
|---|---|
| Krazy Kanmani | Host |
| Super Challenge | Host |
| Vanakkam Tamizha | Host |
| Savaale Samali | Host |
| Pudhu Padam Eppadi Irukku | Host |
| Suda Suda Chennai | Host |
| Ethirneechal Thodargiradhu | Madhivadhini Rajendran IAS (2025 - present) |
