= Haraa (film) =

Indian Tamil-language action film

- Theatrical release poster
- Directed by: Vijay Sri G
- Written by: Vijay Sri G
- Produced by: Kovai SP Mohanraj
- Starring: Mohan; Anumol
- Cinematography: Mano Dinakarn; Prakath Munusamy
- Edited by: Guna
- Music by: Rashaanth Arwin
- Production company: JM Productions Private Limited
- Distributed by: Elma Pictures
- Release date: 7 June 2024
- Country: India
- Language: Tamil

Haraa (transl. The one who destroys evil) is a 2024 Indian Tamil-language action thriller film written and directed by Vijay Sri G starring Mohan in lead role after a hiatus of 16 years. The film also stars Anumol in an important role. It was released on 7 June 2024, and received mixed-to-negative reviews from critics.

== Plot ==
Ram, Nila, and their daughter Nimisha live a happy life in Ooty. Ram is deeply devoted to Nimisha. Their life is ruined when Ram receives news that Nimisha has committed suicide in Coimbatore. Determined to uncover the truth, Ram takes on the identity of "Dawood Ibrahim" and investigates the reasons behind his daughter's death with the help of some of Nimisha's friends. Ram finds out about major scams in the medical field such as faulty medicines, pregnancy test kits etc. He also exposes a forced prostitution ring. He kidnaps all the network of thugs involved in these activities. Finally, it is revealed that Nimisha is not dead, and she has been planned to be sold by the prostitution network. Ram saves Nimisha and the family unites.

== Cast ==
- Mohan as Ram / Dawood Ibrahim
- Anumol as Nila
- Yogi Babu as Lawyer
- Rajendran
- Suresh Chandra Menon as Neeram
- Charuhasan
- Kaushik Ram as Vamsi
- Anithra Nair as Anitha
- Singampuli
- Aadhavan
- Deepa Shankar as Judge
- Manobala as Professor
- Pala. Karuppiah as Chief Minister
- Vanitha Vijayakumar as Minister
- Mime Gopi
- Sai Dheena as Police Inspector
- Swathi as Nimisha
- Scissor Manohar
- Chaams as Security
- Deepak Balachandran as Asst Commr of Police at Ooty
- Jayakumar as a suspended police inspector at Ooty
- Boys Rajan as Police Officer
- Vijay Sri G in a special role

== Production ==
=== Development ===
Director Vijay Sri G who had directed Dha Dha 87 and Powder convinced Mohan to play the lead role in his action film. Vijay Sri said that "Mohan received many offers from different directors but those offers didn't excite him, but he liked the script of Haraa". The crew released the glimpse of the film on Mohan's birthday (10 May) and confirmed actor Charuhasan's presence in the film, marking his second collaboration with Vijay Sri G after Dha Dha 87. The film marked Mohan's comeback to Tamil cinema after Sutta Pazham (2008).

=== Casting and filming ===
Principal photography began on 1 January 2022. Khushbu Sundar was confirmed to be the lead actress. The film's second schedule ended on 24 April 2022 at Coimbatore. Anumol later replaced Khushbu after the latter was unable to film any scenes as the film went through production delays due to the director having an accident. Anumol filmed her portions as of 31 October 2023. Filming wrapped in January 2024. Dubbing works commenced the same month.

== Music ==
The music is composed by Rashaanth Arwin, replacing the previously announced Leander Lee Marty. The first single titled "Kaya Muya" was released on 7 October 2022. The audio launch was held on 10 May 2024. The second single "Magale" was released on 20 May. The third single "Vaada Malli" was released on 31 May. The fourth single "Aasai Devathai" was released on 3 June.

Track listing
No.	Title	Lyrics	Singer(s)	Length
1.	"Kaya Muya"	Vijay Sri G	V. M. Mahalingam, Shakthi Muralidaran	4:40
2.	"Magale"	Vijay Sri G	Sai Vignesh	3:20
3.	"Vaada Malli"	Vijay Sri G	Rashaanth Arwin, Shobika Murukesan
4.	"Aasai Devathai"		Irwin Victoria
Total length:				8:00

== Release and reception ==
Haraa was released theatrically on 7 June 2024, by Elma Pictures. Abhinav Subramanian of The Times of India rated the film one-and-a-half out of five stars, criticising the screenplay for lack of coherence, but appreciated Mohan's performance, saying he has "done whatever the character has demanded". Narayani M of Cinema Express also rated the film one-and-a-half out of five and noted "The biggest setback for Haraa lies in its depiction of a few stock villains", but "what is appreciation-worthy is the way Ram handles the male villains who suffer from common medical issues". Manigandan KR of Times Now wrote, "The film tries hard to come across as an intelligent, investigative thriller but only succeeds in showcasing itself as a long-drawn, uninspiring drama that takes its own sweet time to come to an end".
