= Vijay Sri G =

- Occupations: Film director; actor
- Years active: 2019–present

Vijay Sri G is an Indian film director and actor who works in Tamil-language films.

== Career ==
Vijay's first film was Dha Dha 87 (2019) starring Charuhasan and Saroja (Keerthy Suresh's grandmother) touted to be a sequel to Sathyaa (1988), which the filmmaker denied prior to the film's release via its tagline, 'I am not Sathya'. His latest film Haraa (2024) marked the comeback of Mohan. The film, which began production in 2022, experienced delays due to Vijay having an accident. Two films that he worked on Polladha Ulagil Bayangara Game (PUBG) and Thalir are yet to release.

== Filmography ==
Year	Title	Notes
2019	Dha Dha 87	Also actor
2022	Powder	Also actor
2024	Haraa	Also actor
