= Applause Entertainment =

India-based film production studio

- Type: Subsidiary
- Industry: Film production
- Founded: 2017; 9 years ago
- Headquarters: Mumbai, India
- Key people: Sameer Nair (CEO)(2017-April 2026); Priti Shahani CEO (April 2026 - Onwards); Deepak Segal (Content Head)
- Products: Web Series
- Services: Film production
- Parent: Aditya Birla Group
- Website: applauseentertainment.in

Applause Entertainment, a venture of the Aditya Birla Group of Companies, headed by Priti Shahani is a media, content and IP creation studio.

== Television shows ==
Title	Release date	Network	Line\Co-production	Synopsis	Notes
Mind the Malhotras	2019	Amazon Prime Video	Born Free Entertainment	Mind the Malhotras is an Indian sitcom series by Dia Mirza, based on Israeli comedy La Famiglia, follows the lives of Malhotra family, who have reasons to be happy but the couple is going through mid-life crisis so they go for therapy.	Adaptation of La Famiglia British Series,
Criminal Justice	2019	Hotstar	BBC Studios India	Criminal Justice is an Indian series based on Criminal Justice by Peter Moffat, adapted for India by Shridhar Raghavan	Adaptation of Criminal Justice British Series
Hostages	2019	Hotstar	Banijay Asia	Hostages is an Indian crime thriller web television series directed by Sudhir Mishra. It is an official adaptation of an Israeli series Hostages	Adaptation of Hostages
City of Dreams	2019	Hotstar	Kukunoor Movies	City of Dreams (TV series) is an Indian series by Nagesh Kukunoor. City of Dreams is the story of the feud within the Gaikwad family, which erupts after an assassination attempt on a polarizing political figure. Blurring the lines between moral and immoral, in a struggle for power forms the core of this transfixing narrative.	The idea for the show came from Kukunoor's team member, Rohit Banawlikar. Banawlikar and Kukunoor co-wrote an anthology, intended to be turned into a feature film. But as digital platforms grew in India, Kukunoor felt that there was a scope for a series
The Office	2019	Hotstar	BBC Studios India	The Office is an Indian television sitcom streaming on Hotstar. It is an adaptation of the original BBC series The Office, although it follows the American remake more closely.	Adaptation of The Office British Series
The Office Season 2	2019	Hotstar	BBC Studios India	The Office is an Indian television sitcom streaming on Hotstar. It is an adaptation of the original BBC series The Office, although it follows the American remake more closely.	Adaptation of The Office British series
Iru Dhuruvam	2019	Sony Liv	Sign of Life Productions	Inspector Viktor is assigned to an unusual series of killings. The killer leaves notes that quote verses from "Thirukkural" (a classic Tamil text). As Viktor starts solving the case, it becomes increasingly and alarmingly personal.	Tamil series
Madhuri Talkies	2020	MX Player	Arvind Babbal Productions	Madhuri Talkies is a Bhojpuri neo-noir set in the heartlands of Varanasi and Mughalsarai, where crimes against women and political tyranny rule the roost.	
Hasmukh	2020	Netflix	Emmay Entertainment	Directed by Nikhil Gonsalves, Hasmukh is the story of a small-town comedian who has good material but terrible delivery. Things take an unusual turn when he discovers that the adrenaline rush he gets from committing murder makes brings him his onstage mojo. He eventually makes it to a reality show in Mumbai, but as he has to kill offstage to kill it onstage. How long till the killer-humoured comedian gets caught?	
Rasbhari	2020	Amazon Prime Video	Ding Entertainment	When investment specialists, Amarinder Gill, Noorpreet Dhillon, Puneet Chandok, and Lovely Singh Chhabra find themselves longing for the right man in Mumbai, one happens to come across an exact match, with whom she settles down and sets up an alliance. Now, it is up to the rest of the girl to find the right men.	
Hello Mini	2019	MX Player	Rose Audio Visuals	Rivanah, new to Mumbai, realises that someone is stalking her. Despite being threatened and blackmailed by her stalker, she is drawn to him and soon feels that he is actually helping her.	Adaptation of the book Marry Me, Stranger
Bhaukaal	2020-2022	MX Player	Baweja Movies	SSP Naveen Sikhera is determined to cleanse Muzaffarnagar - a city is in a state of chaos and utter lawlessness. When he starts the job, he is challenged by the utter despair of people living under the fear of local gangs. He reforms the police and nabs any and every effort of the criminals to take control of the city.	The story is based on the story of IPS officer Navniet Sekera.
Mannphodganj ki Binny	2020	MX Player		Set in a small-town called Mannphodganj, lives a self-proclaimed beauty queen - Binni Bajpai. When her plan to escape her middle-class life fails, the story swiftly turns to take the form of a bitter-sweet saga of lovers.	This story is based on the novel Band Baaja Boys by Rachna Singh and is directed by Vikas Chandra
Your Honor	2020-2021	Sony LIV	Yes Studios Sphere Origins	Your Honor is based on the 2017 Israeli TV series Kvodo.	
Avrodh- The siege within	2020-2022	Sony Liv	Irada Entertainment	On 18 September 2016, four militants attacked the Indian army brigade headquarters in Uri. Kashmir. 10 days later, Indian special forces launched a surgical strike on the militants' camp, and the world was given a clear message that India will maintain a zero-tolerance approach to terrorist encroachment along her border.	
Scam 1992	2020	SonyLIV	Studio NEXT	Scam 1992 - The Harshad Mehta Story is story of Indian stock broker Harshad Mehta.	This is based on the book The Scam: Who Won, who Lost, who Got Away
Humble Politiciann Nograj	2022	Voot		sequel of Humble Politiciann Nograj	
Mithya	2022	ZEE5	Rose Audio Visuals		It's a Remake of British TV series Cheat
Rudra: The Edge of Darkness	2022	Disney+ Hotstar	BBC Studios		It's a Remake of British TV Series Luther
Bloody Brothers	2022	ZEE5	BBC Studios	It's a Remake of British TV series Guilt	
Udan Patolas	2022	Amazon Mini TV	Sol production	Set in the city of Mumbai, Udan Patolas tells the story of four Punjabi girls.	
Salt City	2022	Sony Liv	Sunshine Production	Hindi-language family-drama show	
Criminal Justice: Adhura Sach	2022	Hotstar	BBC Studios India	Criminal Justice is an Indian series based on Criminal Justice by Peter Moffat, adapted for India by Shridhar Raghavan	Adaptation of Criminal Justice British Series
Tanaav	2022	Sony Liv	Applause Entertainment	A special force is sent to Kashmir to keep terrorism under control. Team leader kills the leader of the terrorists.Later it was found that the terrorist leader was still alive and was planning something big to upset the peace in Kashmir.	Official adaptation of Israeli TV Series Fauda
Taj: Divided by Blood	2023	Zee5	Contiloe Pictures	Set in Mughal era, the show creators, confess it to be a darker and edgier version of Mughal history rather than what is generally taught in textbooks. starting from the birth of Shah Jahan lastly till his death.	
Kafas	2023	SonyLIV	Madiba Entertainment	When their son encounters a job chance that will change his life, a middle-class family believes the future will be brighter. However, this change merely serves to reveal a complex network of trauma, prompting important inquiries on money, authority, and morality.	
Scam 2003	2023	Sony Liv	Studio NEXT	Show based on the Abdul Karim Telgi	
Iru Dhuruvam 2	2023	SonyLIV	Sign of Life Productions		Tamil series
Zindaginama	2024	SonyLIV			
36 Days	2024	SonyLIV	BBC Studio India		
Black Warrant	2025	Netflix	Andolan	based on the 2019 non-fiction book Black Warrant (book) by Sunil Gupta and Sunetra Choudhury	
The Hunt - The Rajiv Gandhi Assassination Case	2025	SonyLIV	Kukunoor Movies	Based on the book "Ninety Days: The True Story of the Hunt for Rajiv Gandhi's Assassins" by Anirudhya Mitra	
The Game: You Never Play Alone	2025	Netflix		A character-driven Tamil thriller series that unravels the hidden costs of living in a hyper-connected world.	Premieres on 2 October
Search: The Naina Murder Case	2025	JioHotstar	Highgate Entertainment	A cop investigating the murder of a teenage girl named Naina	Premieres on 10 October
Mrs. Deshpande	2025	JioHotstar	Kukunoor Movies	Police seek help from imprisoned serial killer to catch a copycat murderer mimicking her methods.	Premieres on 19 December
Hunkkaar	2026	Jio Hotstar	Birla Studios Purple Pebble Pictures Mangata Films	Meenu Rawat, a 17-year-old student who accuses a powerful, revered spiritual leader named Sunil Chakosi alias "Baapji" of sexual assault	Premieres on 25 September 2026
Gandhi †	2026	TBA	Studio NEXT	Based on the life of Mahatma Gandhi	In production

Key
†	Denotes films that have not yet been released

== Films ==
Key
†	Denotes films that have not yet been released

Year	Title	Co-production	Notes	Ref.
2003	Tapana	Wing Commander Ramesh		
2005	Black	SLB Films		
2023	The Rapist	Quest Films Pvt. Ltd		
2023	Zwigato	Nandita Das Initiatives		
2023	Por Thozhil	E4 Experiments, Eprius Studio	Tamil film	
2024	Do Aur Do Pyaar	Ellipsis Entertainment Production		
2024	Sharmajee Ki Beti	Ellipsis Entertainment	Released on Amazon Prime Video	
2024	Modern Masters: S. S. Rajamouli	Film Companion Studios	Documentary feature	
2025	Bison Kaalamaadan	Neelam Studios	Tamil film	
2026	Jab Khuli Kitaab	Shoestrap Films	Released on ZEE5	
2026	Everybody Loves Sohrab Handa	Mithya Talkies	Released on ZEE5	
2026	Main Vaapas Aaunga	Birla Studios, Window Seat Films		
