= Krish (Tamil director) =

Indian film director

- க்ரிஷ்
- Occupation: Film director
- Years active: 2018 – present

Krish (க்ரிஷ்) is an Indian film director who works in the Tamil film industry. He made his directorial debut with Zhagaram, Which has been made on a budget of Rs 10 lakh.

== Filmography ==
=== Director ===
Year	Film	Actor	Notes
2019	Zhagaram	Nandha Durairaj	10 laks budget feature film
2022	Travel-la oru kadhal	under production	

=== Producer ===
DESANTHIRI PRODUCTIONS is an Indian Film Production Company, founded by Krish.

Year	Film	Actor	Notes
2022	Travel-la oru kadhal		under production
