= Theeyavar Kulai Nadunga =

2025 Indian action thriller film

- Theatrical release poster
- Directed by: Dinesh Lakshmanan
- Written by: Dinesh Lakshmanan; Navaneethan Sunderrajan (dialogues)
- Produced by: G. Arul Kumar
- Starring: Arjun; Aishwarya Rajesh; Abhirami Venkatachalam
- Cinematography: Saravanan Abimanyu
- Edited by: Lawrence Kishore
- Music by: Bharath Aaseevagan
- Production company: GS Arts
- Release date: 21 November 2025
- Running time: 123 minutes
- Country: India
- Language: Tamil

Theeyavar Kulai Nadunga (transl. Evil groups tremble) is an Indian Tamil-language action thriller film written and directed by Dinesh Lakshmanan in his debut, starring Arjun and Aishwarya Rajesh in the lead roles. The film was released in theatres on 21 November 2025.

== Plot ==
A writer is killed by a mysterious person and left in the middle of a road. Police inspector Magudapathy is assigned to investigate the case. The writer's daughter reveals to Magudapathy that, a few months earlier, her father had suddenly changed. He became deeply depressed, constantly claiming that he had committed a sin, and despite being a lifelong atheist, he started attending church. However, he refused to tell anyone the reason. Magudapathy suspects that whatever caused the writer's sudden change may be connected to his murder, so he begins investigating his past. He examines the writer's belongings, including books, photographs, and drawings.

Meanwhile, Aadhi is a young man working as a medical technician. His mother is mentally unstable, but instead of admitting her to a hospital, he keeps her at home and takes care of her himself. His kind nature impresses Meera, who becomes his girlfriend. Meera works as a teacher at a special school for autistic children.

Based on photographs taken by the writer, Magudapathy believes that he frequently visited an apartment complex. He investigates the complex but is initially unable to uncover any useful information. He later learns that a teenage girl named Kaveri died there in an accident. Kaveri is also the title of the writer's unfinished novel, raising Magudapathy's suspicion that the two are connected. He also discovers that the writer and the apartment complex's owner, Varadharajan, were friends. Coincidentally, Magudapathy encounters Aadhi and Meera at the apartment, where Aadhi lives and Meera is visiting him.

Magudapathy visits Varadharajan for questioning, but he is initially uncooperative. After Magudapathy shows him a photograph of Kaveri, however, Varadharajan agrees to answer his questions, requesting that they speak privately. That night, the two meet at a beach, where Varadharajan claims that he knows who killed the writer. Before he can reveal the person's identity, however, an assassin kills him and escapes.

Magudapathy analyzes the writer's unfinished novel, which, according to one of the writer's friends, is based on his own life. Eventually, Magudapathy is able to interpret its meaning. The writer and the builder Varadharajan were friends. Varadharajan was a womanizer and a pedophile. One day, while drinking at Varadharajan's house, Varadharajan sexually exploited Kaveri, taking advantage of the fact that she was autistic and unable to speak. Although the writer initially refused to participate, Varadharajan eventually persuaded him. Two of Varadharajan's employees assisted in the assault. Fearing exposure afterward, Varadharajan ordered Kaveri's murder. Her death left the writer consumed with guilt, causing his sudden change in personality. Soon afterward, Varadharajan's two employees are also killed. Magudapathy suspects Meera of committing all four murders, as she had been Kaveri's teacher, was one of the few people close to her, and is skilled in martial arts.

Magudapathy attempts to locate Meera and questions Aadhi about her whereabouts, revealing that she is his prime suspect. After learning this, Aadhi secretly meets Meera and attacks her. It is then revealed that Aadhi had also sexually abused Kaveri in a separate incident. Fearing that he is also on Meera's list of targets, he attempts to kill her. Meera had already learned of Aadhi's crime through his mother. After discovering what her son had done, Aadhi's mother confronted him, but he assaulted her. To protect herself, she has pretended to be mentally unstable ever since. It is also revealed that Aadhi keeps his mother at home not out of love, but to prevent her from exposing him.

In the ensuing brutal fight, Aadhi overpowers Meera and is about to kill her when Magudapathy intervenes and saves her. He subdues Aadhi, hands his gun to Meera, and promises to protect her from any legal consequences. Meera then shoots Aadhi dead.

== Cast ==
- Arjun as Inspector Magudapathy
- Aishwarya Rajesh as Meera
- Abhirami Venkatachalam as Revathi
- Ramkumar Ganesan as Varadharajan
- Thangadurai as Kuppan
- P. L. Thenappan as Sankaran
- O. A. K. Sundar as Chandrasekhar
- Vela Ramamoorthy as Muthuraj
- Ajay Rathnam as Church Father
- Baby Anik as Anjali
- Prankster Rahul as Mani
- Priyadarshini as Kavitha
- Syed as Syed
- GK Reddy as GK Reddy
- Padman as Padman
- Praveen Raja as Adhi
- Logu. Npks as Ramesh

== Production ==
Touted as a investigative thriller film revolving around autistic children, the film was announced through a first-look poster 4 March 2022. The film directed by debutant Dinesh Lakshmanan was titled Theeyavar Kulaigal Nadunga. The film stars Arjun and Aishwarya Rajesh in the lead roles, who were last seen in Aghathiyaa and Sankranthiki Vasthunam (both 2025) respectively. The film is produced by G. Arul Kumar under his GS Arts banner, while Navaneethan Sunderrajan has contributed towards writing the dialogues in the film. The technical team consists of Bharath Aaseevagan as the music composer, Saravanan Abimanyu as the cinematographer, Lawrence Kishore as the editor, Arunshankar Durai as the art director, and Kickass Kali, Rajasekar, and Vicky as the action choreographers. Filming was in progress during the announcement in March 2022 and was wrapped by the end of August 2023. The teaser was released on 19 September 2025 and the trailer was released on 13 November 2025.

== Music ==
The music was composed by Bharath Aaseevagan. The first single titled "Andhipera Azhagaaliye" was released on 4 April 2025.

Track listing
No.	Title	Lyrics	Singer(s)	Length
1.	"Andhipera Azhagaaliye"	Tamil Mani	Adithya RK	3:21
2.	"Maya Mazhalai Megam"	Vivek	Pradeep Kumar	4:22
3.	"Sudhandhirane"	Vijay Shunmugam	Keneesha	3:15
4.	"Kaanalaye Kaanalaye"	Tamil Mani	Rockstar Ramani Amma	3:10
Total length:				14:08

== Release ==
=== Theatrical ===
Theeyavar Kulai Nadunga released in theatres on 21 November 2025 in Tamil along with its dubbed versions in Telugu, Malayalam and Kannada languages.

=== Home media ===
Theeyavar Kulai Nadunga began streaming on Sun NXT from 12 December 2025.

== Reception ==
Dinamalar rated the film with two-point-two-five out of five stars and Maalai Malar with one-point-five out of five stars. Avinash Ramachandran of Cinema Express gave 1.5/5 stars and wrote "The film ends up being a half-baked vigilante film that had the semblance of a good idea, and the makers decided to run with it, hoping that intent would save the day."
