= Zhagaram =

2019 Indian film by Krish

- Theatrical Release Poster
- Directed by: Krish
- Written by: Kava Kamz, Krish
- Starring: Nandha Durairaj; Eden Kuriakose; Meenesh Krishnaa; Vishnu Bharath; Zahagaram Chandra Mohan
- Edited by: Venkat Lakshmanan
- Music by: Dharan Kumar
- Release date: 12 April 2019
- Running time: 112 minutes
- Country: India
- Language: Tamil
- Budget: ₹1 million

Zhagaram is a 2019 Indian Tamil-language adventure thriller film directed by debutant director Krish. Starring Nandha Durairaj in the lead role, the film is an adaption of Kava Kamz's Tamil fiction novel, Project AK. The film has been titled after Zha, one of the most popular and peculiar letters in the Tamil language. Featuring music composed by Dharan Kumar, the film also stars Eden Kuriakose as the female lead, and has been produced with a budget of ₹1 million.

The film follows Akhil, a young man who decides to uncover the mystery behind a treasure after he discovers clues left by his grandfather, an archaeologist who was himself on the trail of this treasure. Accompanied by his friends, Akhil embarks on a treasure hunt that leads them to places like Mahabalipuram, Thanjavur and Coimbatore, while another group after the same treasure attempts to prevent them from discovering it.

The film was released theatrically on 12 April 2019. Plot The film revolves around Akhil, a young man working in the bustling city of Chennai. Following the mysterious death of his grandfather, he meets with a minor accident, after which he receives a phone call from a stranger, threatening him to disclose any information he regarding his late grandfather. After being discharged from the hospital, Akhil's father gives him a gift given by his grandfather. On opening it, he identifies it to be a strange dice. He is joined by his two best friends, Suriya and Sudarshan. Along with the dice, they discover a letter from Akhil's late grandfather, in which he warns about the danger surrounding him and about a hidden treasure, which he must find and destroy. The group is joined by Akhil's former girlfriend Sneha, and together they find their way towards the treasure which makes up the major crux of the film. = Plot ==

== Cast ==
- Nandha Durairaj as Akhil
- Eden Kuriakose as Sneha
- Vamsi Krishna as Dev
- Vishnu Bharath as Surya
- Rajashekhar as Sivagnyanam
- Meenesh Krishnaa
- Chandra Mohan
- Subash Kannan
- Kothandam

== Music ==
Dharan Kumar scored the film's soundtrack. The soundtrack received positive reviews from critics.

Zhagaram

Soundtrack album by Dharan Kumar
- Released: 2018
- Genre: Feature film soundtrack
- Length: 10:28
- Label: Trend Music

Dharan Kumar chronology
Maanik (2018)	Zhagaram (2018)	Natpuna Ennanu Theriyuma (2019)

Original track list (Tamil)
No.	Title	Lyrics	Singer(s)	Length
1.	"Idhu Varai Naan"	Kabilan	Haricharan, Swetha Mohan	5:14
2.	"Idhu Varai Naan (Instrumental Version)"			5:14
Total length:				10:28
