= Irukku Aana Illai =

2014 Indian film by K. M. Saravanan

- Theatrical poster
- Directed by: K. M. Saravanan
- Written by: K. M. Saravanan; Rajprabu (dialogues)
- Produced by: Sathya Nagaraj; S. Chelladurai; Sami P. Venkat; Balamani Jayabalan
- Starring: Vivanth; Eden; Manishaa Shree; Aadhavan; Y. G. Mahendra
- Cinematography: Kris. A. Chandar
- Edited by: S. P. Ahmed
- Music by: Shammeer
- Production company: Varam Creations
- Distributed by: RPP Film Factory
- Release date: 18 July 2014
- Country: India
- Language: Tamil

Irukku Aana Illai (transl. It is there, but it isn't) is a 2014 Indian Tamil-language comedy thriller film written and directed by debutant K. M. Saravanan, a former assistant of Yugi Sethu. It features Vivanth, Eden, Manisha Shree, Aadhavan and Y. G. Mahendra , while Shammeer composes the film's music. The film has cinematography by Kris. A. Chandar and the technical crew includes editing by S. P. Ahmed and art direction by Ravindran. It is produced by Sathya Nagaraj, S. Chelladurai, Sami P. Venkat and Balamani Jayabalan under their banner Varam Creations, and distributed by RPP Film Factory. The film released on 18 July 2014 to positive reviews.

== Plot ==
The movie begins in a bar, where an aspiring director meets his friends. One of his friend, Meenakshi Sundaram says he has a beautiful horror story script from his own experience and narrates what happened in his friend's life.

Venkat, is a software engineer who is unlucky in whatever he does and is a sore loser. He is often taunted by his colleagues and is a loner. His only friend is Meenakshi Sundaram. One day, his boss at work admonishes him in front of the whole office for his performance, so in sadness he gets drunk that night and is involved in an automobile accident, where a young girl Divya, is killed. He panics and leaves the place and goes to his house. In the middle of the night, he wakes up to find that the spirit of Divya has followed him to his house and only he can see and hear her. It seems that Divya does not have a clue of who she is and is also stubborn that she would not leave the house unless Venkat helps her uncover who she is. He consults a doctor Mathrubootham who says that the existence of ghosts is true and he should stop whining and start helping the soul and make it rest in peace.

Hilarious incidents unfold, as Meenakshi and Venkat get in the process of finding her identity. Due to Divya's talkative nature, Venkat now is comfortable with the idea of getting along with the ghost, and he becomes friends with her. She also helps him in changing his personality and helps in giving him a makeover and induces his self-confidence and he gains respect from his colleagues and friends and even girls try to get his attention. One day, a pickpocket steals his purse and Venkat catches him and when he demands his purse, another wallet falls out with the pictures of Divya. He asks the thief where he stole that from, and finds that it is Divya's mother's wallet stolen from a hospital.

With this clue, Venkat and Divya go to the hospital where she remembers bits and pieces of incidents. She says that she has a mother and an identical twin sister Kavya. Kavya is sick with respiratory problems, that is the reason she was in the hospital. She makes Venkat visit her mother and he befriends her. One night, as Divya looks at her ailing sister in the hospital, she finds the doctor Rangarajan sending out the nurses and injecting something into the IV bottle. She is suspicious and informs this to Venkat and his doctor Mathrubootham. With Meenakshi's help, Venkat steals Kavya's case file from the hospital on Mathrubootham's request to analyse it. Mathrubootham finds that the sedations given to Kavya are of heavy dosage and there is something fishy about this pattern of treatment. When they investigate further, Divya finds that Dr.Rangarajan is planning to steal Kavya's heart by making her brain dead and transplant it to a wealthy person for a huge sum of money. Venkat, Divya, Mathrubootham and Meenakshi try to stop this racket, but the doctor cleverly manipulates Divya's mother to agree for a surgery using Kavya's deteriorating health as bait. Meenakshi, Mathrubootham and Venkat are manhandled and locked up by goons when they try to prevent the surgery. So, Divya takes the matter into her hands and possesses Dr.Rangarajan as he is about to start the surgery. She makes him slit his own throat and commit suicide and the surgery is stopped. After a while, Kavya regains consciousness and Divya is at peace and she says she loves venkat and she leaves after a final adieu to all of them.

As Meenakshi finishes narrating this story, he says that the next day, when Venkat opened the door, he found someone standing at his door. She was a woman identical to how Divya looked. The movie ends here leaving the aspiring director as well as the audience to wonder who she really is, Kavya or Divya again?

== Cast ==
- Vivanth as Venkat
- Eden as Divya and Kavya
- Manishaa Shree as Madhu
- Aadhavan as Meenakshi Sundaram
- Y. G. Mahendra as Dr. Mathruboodham
- Raviraj as Dr. Rangarajan
- Georgia Royes as Georgia
- K. Manikandan as Nainamalai

== Production ==
The filming started on 25 September 2013 and has been completed. Producers Sathya Nagaraj, Chelladurai, Sami P. Venkat and Balamani Jayabalan from Kuwait started their maiden venture Irukku Aana Illai. AKV. Kalaignani (one of the sons of late A.K. Velan of Arunachalam Studios) was chosen as the Executive Producer and a panel of judges went through 60 stories before selecting Irukku Aana Illa. The audio was released by Parivendar T. R. Pachamuthu in Kuwait on 22 November 2013.

== Soundtrack ==
Music is composed by newcomer Shammeer. The soundtrack features six tracks. Lyrics written by Naveen Kannan, Vasanth and Sengai Nilavan.

No.	Song	Lyricist	Singers
1	"Irukku Aana Illa"	Navin Kannan	Santosh Hariharan
2	"Kaalai Adhi Kaalai"	Navin Kannan	Deepak, Anoop Unni Krishna
3	"Aiyo Indru En Vanil"	Navin Kannan	Ananya Thirumalai
4	"Tholla Thaangala"	Vasanth	Nivas
5	"Kaargala Megam"	Sengai Nilavan	Deepak, Ananya Thirumalai
6	"Idhu Enna Idhu Enna"	Navin Kannan	Nivas
