= Iniya (TV series) =

Indian television series

- Genre: Drama
- Written by: Dialogue; Marimuthu
- Screenplay by: Rajarshri; Sekkizhar
- Directed by: Narayana Moorthy; Stalin; A.P. Rajendran
- Starring: Alya Manasa; Rishi
- Opening theme: "Paattu Paadava"; Nithyashree (Vocals); Kannadasan (Lyrics)
- Composer: Dharan Kumar (opening theme)
- Country of origin: India
- Original language: Tamil
- No. of seasons: 1
- No. of episodes: 646

Production
- Producer: Saregama India
- Editor: K. Shankar
- Camera setup: Multi-camera
- Running time: approx.20-22 minutes per episode
- Production company: Saregama

Original release
- Network: Sun TV
- Release: 5 December 2022 – 3 November 2024

Iniya was a 2022–2024 Indian Tamil-language television series starring Alya Manasa and Rishi and directed by Narayana Moorthy. It aired on Sun TV from 5 December 2022 to 3 November 2024 for 646 episodes. It was replaced by Ranjani. It is produced by Saregama .

== Awards ==
It also won numerous awards, including the Sun Kudumbam Viruthugal 2023 Favorite Hero Award for Rishi and Favorite Heroine Award for Alya Manasa.

== Cast ==
=== Main ===
- Alya Manasa as Iniya Vikraman: Vikram's wife; Yazhini's younger sister (2022–2024)
- Rishi as ACP Vikraman Nallasivam alias (Vikram): Iniya's husband; Nallasivam's elder son (2022–2024)

=== Recurring ===
- Sravan Rajesh as Suryakumar Shankarasubramaniam: Iniya's best friend and Akshaya's husband (2023–2024)
- Deepthi Kapil as Maya: Iniya's best friend turned arch enemy as Iniya was the reason behind Maya's failure in exam and Maya's father's death (2024)(Dead)
- L. Raja as Nallasivam: Retired police officer Vikraman, Elangovan and Akshaya's father (2022–2024)
- Mansi Joshi as Yazhini Elangovan: Elango's wife; Iniya's elder sister (2022–2024)
- Deepak Kumar as Elangovan Nallasivam alias (Elango): Yazhini's husband; Nallasivam's younger son (2022–2024)
- Praveena as Gowri Nallasivam: Nallasivam's wife; Vikraman, Elangovan and Akshaya's mother (2022–2024)
- Sai Madhavi as Amudhavalli Parandhaman alias Amudha: Parandhaman's wife; Nallasivam's second younger sister; Swetha's mother and Iniya's enemy (2023–2024)
- Sriranjini / Gayathri Priya as Rajalakshmi: Suryakumar's mother (2023–2024)
- Preetha Reddy as Akshaya Nallasivam / (now Akshaya Surya Kumar): Nallasivam's younger daughter; Vikraman and Elangovan sister; Surya Kumar's wife (2022–2024)
- Santhana Bharathi as Thiruvasagam: Lakshmi's widower; Iniya and Yazhini's father (2022–2024)

=== Other Cast ===
- Mahesh Prabha as Inspector Subhash: Vikram's best friend (2022–2024)
- Unknown as Iniya and Elango's office boss
- VJ Dhanusek Vijayakumar as Keerthi: Iniya's friend (2023)
- Kavitha Solairaja as Dhanalakshmi alias Dhanam: Nallasivam's first younger sister; Meena's mother (2023)
- Jayashri Jue as Meena: Vikram's cousin (2023)
- Lailla as Sonalli: Iniya's friend; Rajesh's wife (2022–2023)
- Ricchaire as Rajesh: Sonali's husband (2022–2023)
- Udumalai Ravi as Head Constable Chidambaram (2022–2023)
- Sidharth Kapilavayi as Nallasivam's henchman (2023)
- Mithun Raj as Arjun (2024)
- Andrew Jesudoss as Arjun's father (2024)
- Jagadeesh as Commissioner Jegadeesan (2022–2024)
- Afsal Hameed as Raghunandan "Raghu" Kannayiram: Vikram's enemy (2023)(Dead)
- Baboos as Sivanandi: Maya's henchman (2024) (Dead)
- Vishwanathan as Parandhaman: Amudha's husband; Swetha's father (2023)
- Ramya Srinivasan as Swetha: Elango's cousin (2023)
- Guhan Shanmugam as Murthy (2024)

=== Special appearances ===
- Uma Padmanabhan as Lakshmi Thiruvasagam: Iniya and Yazhini's mother; Thiruvasgam's wife (2022; 2023) (Dead)
- Vadivukkarasi as Periya Aachi (2023)
- Jangiri Madhumitha as herself (2023)
- Kaajal Pasupathi as Bullet Pushpa (2023–2024)
- Srilekha Rajendran as Mangamma (2023)
- Anuradha Krishnamoorthi as Judge Sivagami (2023)
- Ashok Pandian as Sivagami's husband (2023)
- Delhi Kumar as Maya's deceased father (2024)
- Riyaz Khan as ACP Deenadayalan (2024) (Dead)

== Production ==
=== Casting ===
Actor Rishi was cast in the male lead role as Vikraman Vikram. Raja Rani fame Alya Manasa was cast as the female lead role, Iniya. Newcomer Mansi Joshi was cast as Yazhini (Iniya's sister) and Endrendrum Punnagai-fame Deepak was cast as Elango. Actress Praveena was cast as Gowri. Actor L. Raja played the antagonist. Santhana Bharathi, Preetha Reddy, Uma Padmanabhan, Sai Madhavi, Kavitha, Mahesh Prabha and Lailla were selected for supporting roles.

In November 2023, actor Sravan Rajesh was cast as Suriya, marking his return after Chandralekha. In mid-December 2023, Mithun Raj was cast as Arjun.

== Ratings ==
The series had good ratings and was one of the top five serials in 2022–2023.
