= Abhirami Venkatachalam =

Indian model and actress

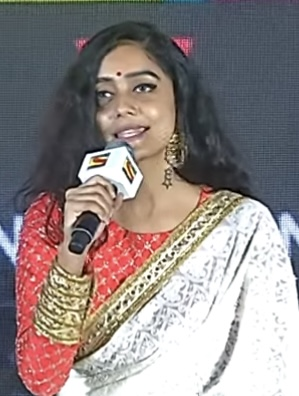
- Abhirami in 2019
- Other name: Abhirami Iyer
- Occupations: Model; actress
- Years active: 2016 – present

Abhirami Venkatachalam is an Indian actress who works in Tamil film industry. She appeared in the first season of the spin-off version of Bigg Boss Tamil called Bigg Boss Ultimate (season 1) and was the 5th runner up.

== Acting career ==
Abhirami had started her career as a model and won the Miss Tamil Nadu 2017 title. In 2016, she starred in the web series Ctrl Alt Delete. The following year, she hosted the reality show Star Wars on Sun TV. Abhirami made her acting debut in Anand Shankar's NOTA (2018), portraying the love interest of the characters portrayed by senior actors Nassar and Sathyaraj. She then appeared Kalavu and portrayed one of the leads in the film.

That same year, she participated in the third season of the reality show Bigg Boss Tamil in 2019. After auditioning for several films including Kaatru Veliyidai and Vikram Vedha, she landed a role in Nerkonda Paarvai (2019). In a review of the film by The Week, the critic noted that "Abhirami is at her best when she shouts and cries in the courtroom". She starred in the web series Iru Dhruvam in 2019 with Nandha. She had also auditioned for the lead heroine in Dhruva Natchathiram before she was signed to portray a supporting role. She has also signed the Malaysian Tamil film titled Gajen and an untitled film with Aari Arjuna.

== Filmography ==
- All films are in Tamil, unless otherwise noted.

| Year | Film | Role | Notes |
|---|---|---|---|
| 2018 | NOTA | Chitra Vinodhan | |
| 2019 | Kalavu | Abhirami | Released on ZEE5 |
| 2019 | Nerkonda Paarvai | Famitha Banu | |
| 2022 | Gajen | Aashika | Malaysian film |
| 2022 | Rocketry: The Nambi Effect | Crew member | Multilingual film |
| 2023 | Vaan Moondru | Jothi | |
| 2023 | Dhruva Natchathiram | Unknown | Unreleased |
| 2025 | Vallan | Anitha | |
| 2025 | Theeyavar Kulai Nadunga | Revathi | |
| 2026 | Anantha | Meenakshi | Released on JioHotstar |
| 2026 | Black Gold | Regina | |
| TBA | Nerunji | TBA | Filming |
| TBA | August 27 | TBA | Malayalam film; filming |

== Other works ==
| Year | Series | Role | Language | Platform | Notes |
|---|---|---|---|---|---|
| 2016 | Ctrl Alt Del | Rohini | Tamil | Put Chutney | YouTube Series |
| 2018 | What’s Up Vellakkari | Lakshmi | Tamil | ZEE5 | |
| 2018 | What’s Up Panimanishi | Lakshmi | Telugu | ZEE5 | |
| 2019 | Iru Dhuruvam | Geetha | Tamil | Sony Liv | |
| 2019 | Chinanjiru - Adhitri | Wife & Mother | Tamil | Ondraga Entertainment | YouTube Music Video |
| 2019 | The Masculinity | Gomathi | Tamil | Galatta Tamil | YouTube Short Video |
| 2020 | Addham | Rekha | Telugu | Aha | Anthology Series; Segment: Cross Roads |
| 2020 | Vallamai Tharayo | Abirami | Tamil | Vikatan | Cameo Appearance YouTube Web Series |
| 2021 | Kannai Katti Kollathey | Preethi & Maya (Dual Role) | Tamil | What Next | YouTube Pilot Film |
| 2021 | Magavu | Anandhi | Tamil | Behindwoods TV | YouTube Short Film |
| 2021 | Vizhumiyam | The Pregnant Women | Malayalam | Cult Productions | YouTube Short Film |
| 2021 | Vizhumiyam | The Pregnant Women | Tamil | Cult Productions | YouTube Short Film |
| 2022 | Aanandham Aarambham | Ranjani Ram Charan | Tamil | Disney + Hotstar | Micro Series |
| 2023 | Iru Dhuruvam 2 | Geetha | Tamil | Sony Liv | |

== Television ==
| Year | Title | Role | Channel | Notes |
|---|---|---|---|---|
| 2016 | Dance Jodi Dance Season 1 | Contestant | Zee Tamil | Episode 1 -6 Only |
| 2017 | Athirshta Lakshmi Season 2 & 3 | Participant | Zee Tamil | Episode 178 & 232 |
| 2017 | Jil Jung Juk | Participant | Zee Tamil | |
| 2017 | Manadhaal Inaivom Maatrathai Varaverppom - Zee Tamil Brand Film | Herself | Zee Tamil | Zee Tamil Brand Short Video |
| 2017–2018 | Star Wars Season 1 & 2 | Host | Sun TV | |
| 2019 | Bigg Boss Tamil Season 3 | Contestant | STAR Vijay | Evicted Day 56 |
| 2019 | Bigg Boss Tamil Season 3 Kondattam | Herself | STAR Vijay | Special show |
| 2020-2021 | Murattu Singles | Judge & Angel | STAR Vijay | |
| 2020 | Star Music Season 2 | Participant | STAR Vijay | With Bigg Boss Season 3 Co-Contestants |
| 2021-2022 | Dance Vs Dance Season 2 | Team Leader & Mentor | Colors Tamil | |
| 2021 | Sillunu Oru Kaadhal | Herself | Colors Tamil | Special Appearance |
| 2021 | BB Jodigal | Guest | Vijay Television | Grand Finale Only |
| 2022 | Bigg Boss Ultimate Season 1 | Contestant | Disney+ Hotstar | 5th Runner Up |
| 2022 | Bigg Boss Tamil Season 6 | Guest | Vijay Television | Season Launch |
| 2022 | Anda Ka Kasam | Guest | Vijay Television | |
| 2024–2025 | Ninaithen Vandhai (TV series) | Sudarvizhi | Zee Tamil | |
