= Vellore Maavattam =

- Theatrical release poster
- Directed by: R. N. R. Manohar
- Written by: R. N. R. Manohar
- Produced by: Kalpathi S. Aghoram; Kalpathi S. Ganesh; Kalpathi S. Suresh
- Starring: Nandaa; Poorna
- Cinematography: Vetri Palanisamy
- Edited by: Suraj Kavee
- Music by: Sundar C. Babu
- Production company: AGS Entertainment
- Release date: 5 October 2011
- Country: India
- Language: Tamil
- Budget: ₹5.5 crore

Vellore Maavattam (transl. Vellore district) is a 2011 Indian Tamil-language action drama film written and directed by R. N. R. Manohar, starring Nandaa and Poorna in the lead roles. Produced by AGS Entertainment, the film was released on 5 October 2011.

== Cast ==
- Nandha as Additional Superintendent of Police Muthukumar IPS
- Poorna as Priya
- Santhanam as Kumaravelu
- Azhagam Perumal as Gurumurthy
- S. Neelakantan as Minister Nachiappan
- G. M. Kumar as Muthukumar's father
- Sathyan
- Sriman as Inspector Subbaiah
- R. N. R. Manohar as Home Minister (Cameo)
- Manobala as Doctor
- Jagan as Actor
- Singamuthu as Veera, Kumaravelu's father
- Mayilsamy as Bus Passenger
- V. I. S. Jayapalan as Minister
- Swaminathan as Retired S.P.
- Vaiyapuri as Babu
- Nandha Periyasamy as Kandeeban
- Nandha Saravanan as Saravanan (Minister Nachiyappan's Henchman)
- Rani as Lakshmi Gurumurthy
- Ravi as Doctor
- Kaajal Pasupathi as Police Officer
- LIC Narasimhan as Bank Officer
- Meghna Naidu (special appearance)

== Production ==
Nandaa played a police officer for the first time. The director and producer cast him after being impressed with his performance in Eeram. To prepare for the role, Nandaa spent 35 days training at the Hyderabad Police Academy. He said the film, unlike other Tamil police films, would be realistic, avoiding unrealistic fight sequences, swag and "punch dialogues".

== Soundtrack ==
The tunes for the album are composed by Sundar C. Babu.

Track listing
No.	Title	Lyrics	Singer(s)	Length
1.	"Adikuthu Adikuthu"	Na. Muthukumar	Senthildass Velayutham, Manikka Vinayagam, Naveen Madhav, Maanasa, Malgudi Subha
2.	"Vaanam Ellam"	Kavivarman	Hariharan, Shruthi
3.	"Unnai Unnai"	Thamarai	Krish, Mahathi
4.	"Party Vandhale"	Ezhil Arasu	Shaan
5.	"Kannala Parkurathum"	Viveka	Anitha
6.	"Saxy Vaanam Ellam"	Instrumental	Martyn

== Critical reception ==
The New Indian Express gave the film a negative review and stated that "For the audience, Vellore Maavattam offers nothing that they haven't seen before!". Malathi Rangarajan of The Hindu wrote, "[Vellore Maavattam] isn't a superhero film. Neither is Muthukumar a super cop. And the significant fact is you understand his angst and empathise with him". Sify wrote, "The film has a predictable story of a honest police officer, which works big time due to Nanda’s immense screen presence and performance".
