= Rishi (Tamil actor) =

Indian actor

- Born: 7 May 1985 (age 41); Chennai, Tamil Nadu, India
- Occupations: Actor, TV Anchor
- Years active: 2005–2016; 2022–2024

Rishi Raj is an Indian film, theatre and television actor. He is known for his work on Sun TV's Deala No Deala, the Tamil-language version of Deal or No Deal and Kaiyil Oru Kodi, the Tamil version of Million Dollar Money Drop. Rishi has appeared in Tamil films most notably Anandha Thandavam and Payanam.

He stayed away from the limelight for more than five years from 2017 and made a comeback in 2022 with the Sun TV soap opera Iniya.

== Early life and career ==
He was born to Malayali and Gujarati parents with his father being a musician and his mother a poet and was brought up in Chennai. While studying engineering, he decided to switch to visual communications and had an interest in theatre.

Rishi appeared in a few fiction and non-fiction shows on STAR Vijay before appearing on Sun TV with Endemol's Deala No Deala (Tamil version of Deal or No Deal). In 2012, Endemol South and Sun TV made Kaiyil Oru Kodi, Are you ready? (Tamil version of Million Dollar Money Drop) with Rishi as the anchor. In 2009-10, Rishi played the lead in the popular Telugu-language soap opera, Sundarakanda the first Indian TV show to be shot in the USA. In 2011, he briefly returned to theatre for the play Raj And His Red Hot Lovers.

== Filmography ==
=== Film ===
Year	Film	Role	Notes
2008	Thodakkam	Habeeb	
2009	Ananda Thandavam	Radhakrishnan	
2010	Mandhira Punnagai	Shankar	
2011	Gaganam	Vinod	Telugu film
2011	Payanam	Vinod	
2012	Mirattal	Gautham	Special appearance
2014	Naan Sigappu Manithan	Karthik	
2014	Yaan	Ram	
2015	JK Enum Nanbanin Vaazhkai	K. Anand	
2019	Sathru	Mahendran	
2023	Beauty		

=== Television ===
Serials

Year	Title	Role	Language	Channel	Notes
2005–2006	Idhu Oru Kadhal Kathai	Ananthu	Tamil	Vijay TV	
2009–2010	Sundarakanda	Ajay	Telugu	Gemini TV	
2012–2013	Padamatha Gali		Telugu	Gemini TV	
2022	Ninaithale Inikkum	Sethupathi IPS	Tamil	Zee Tamil	Special Appearance
2022–2024	Iniyamagal	Vikraman (Vikram)	Tamil	Sun TV	

TV Shows

Year	Title	Role	Language	Channel	Notes
2005	Hello Friend	Anchor	Tamil	Star Vijay	
2011	Deala No Deala	Anchor	Tamil	Sun TV	
2012	Kaiyil Oru Kodi - Are You Ready?	Anchor	Tamil	Sun TV	
2014–2015	Vendhar Veetukkalyanam	Anchor	Tamil	Vendhar TV	
2015–2016	Sun Challenge	Anchor	Tamil	Sun TV	
2022	Vanakkam Tamizha	Guest	Tamil	Sun TV	
2023	Iniyavale Iniya	Participant	Tamil	Sun TV	Guest role
2023	Nattamai Theerpu Mathu	Vikraman	Tamil	Sun TV	
