= Super Challenge =

- சூப்பர் சேலஞ்ச்
- Written by: Rajesh Kannan.A
- Directed by: Neelesh
- Creative director: Pransh.R
- Presented by: Rishi; Kavitha; Nisha; Deepak Dinkar; Diya Menon; Aadhavan; Pavithra
- Original language: Tamil
- No. of seasons: 1
- No. of episodes: 130+

Production
- Producer: Rathiswaran.C
- Camera setup: Multi-camera
- Running time: approx. 40–45 minutes per episode

Original release
- Network: Sun TV
- Release: 8 February 2015 – 16 April 2017

Super Challenge (Tamil: சூப்பர் சேலஞ்ச்) is an Indian Tamil-language television game show that aired on Sun TV from February 8, 2015 to April 16, 2017. The show's hosts were Rishi, Kavitha and Nisha. The show presented celebrities from Sun TV's serials and other Tamil celebrities. They divided into two teams challenging one another in various tasks.

Super Challenge was designed to be a family show and aimed to bring together the entire family audience during Sunday lunchtime.

The show consisted of 5 rounds.

== Rounds ==
The show was organized into multiple rounds:

=== Round 1: Twinkle Twinkle Little Star (Match the Picture) ===
Identify celebrities in photographs.

=== Round 2: Konjam Yosi Konjam Vaasi (Pass the Melody) ===
Chinese whisper game played with music and instruments.

=== Round 3: Pesum Padam (Pictionary) ===
Charades played with the help of the celebrities drawing skills.

=== Round 4: Weight Party (Weigh the Star) ===
Guess the weight of a chosen participant team using a large scale. The team members had to guess the equivalent number of fruits and vegetables it would take to match the celebrities weight.

=== Round 5: Beem Boy Beem Boy (Super Sumo) ===
The participants overcome their weight and perform challenging tasks wearing sumo suits.

=== Episodes ===
(*) = Have Storyline

- Eve absent one episode. (7)
- Redwan absent one episode. (9)
- Ameer absent one episode. (11)
- Alia absent two episodes. (3, 7)
- Elisya absent three episodes. (10-12)

Characters	Episodes												
Characters	1	2	3	4	5	6	7	8	9	10	11	12	13
Redwan	✔️	✔️*	✔️*	✔️	✔️*	✔️*	✔️*	✔️*	✖️	✔️	✔️*	✔️*	
Elisya	✔️*	✔️*	✔️*	✔️	✔️*	✔️*	✔️*	✔️	✔️*	✖️	✖️	✖️	
Ameer	✔️*	✔️	✔️*	✔️	✔️	✔️*	✔️*	✔️	✔️*	✔️	✖️	✔️*	
Aizat	✔️*	✔️	✔️	✔️	✔️*	✔️*	✔️*	✔️	✔️*	✔️*	✔️	✔️*	
Amanda	✔️*	✔️*	✔️*	✔️	✔️*	✔️*	✔️*	✔️	✔️*	✔️*	✔️*	✔️*	
Alia	✔️	✔️*	✖️	✔️	✔️*	✔️*	✖️	✔️	✔️*	✔️	✔️*	✔️*	
Eve	✔️	✔️	✔️	✔️*	✔️*	✔️	✖️	✔️	✔️*	✔️*	✔️*	✔️*	
Karthik	✔️	✔️	✔️	✔️	✔️	✔️*	✔️*	✔️	✔️*	✔️	✔️*	✔️*	

Others

Case	Season 1
1	Yasmin
2	Isharani
3	Nazrina
4	Felicia
5	Shakira
6	Loges
7	Mastura
8	Ashera
9	Puteri
10	Michelle
11	Azlin
12	Joan Hew
13	Yee Qing Ying
14	Siva
15	Haridass
16	Solehan
17	Azzim
18	Haziq
19	Nafiz
20	James
21	Faez
22	Tuah
23	Imran
24	Faulul
25	Tiensh
26	Mathan
