= Beauty (2023 film) =

- poster
- Directed by: Ko. Ananda Siva
- Produced by: R. Deepak Kumar
- Starring: Rishi: Kareena Shah
- Cinematography: R. Deepak Kumar
- Music by: Ilakiyan
- Production company: Om Jayam Theatres
- Release date: 10 March 2023
- Country: India
- Language: Tamil

Beauty is a 2023 Indian Tamil-language drama film directed by Ko. Ananda Siva and starring Rishi and Kareena Shah. It was released on 10 March 2023.

== Cast ==
- Rishi in a dual role
- Kareena Shah
- Kaya Kapoor
- Singamuthu
- Aadesh Bala
- Anandan

== Production ==
The director of the film Ko. Ananda Siva, an erstwhile assistant to K. Bhagyaraj, revealed that he based the script on the real-life experiences of his friend. The film's cinematographer R. Deepak Kumar, doubled up as the film's producer.

== Reception ==
The film was released on 10 March 2023 across Tamil Nadu. A critic from Dina Thanthi gave the film a mixed review while praising the climax for its twist. Critics from Thinaboomi and Dinamani gave the film negative reviews, while a reviewer from Virakesari gave the film 1.5 out of 5 stars.
