= Savaale Samali (TV series) =

- Genre: Drama; Reality
- Presented by: Diya; Adhavan
- Country of origin: India
- Original language: Tamil
- No. of seasons: 1
- No. of episodes: 55

Production
- Production location: Tamil Nadu
- Camera setup: Multi-camera
- Running time: approx. 45-50 minutes per episode
- Production company: Sun Network

Original release
- Network: Sun TV
- Release: 5 November 2017 – 9 December 2018

Related
- Natchathira Kabaddi; Natchathira Special

Savale Samali is a 2017–2018 Tamil reality-comedy game show that airs on Sun TV every Sunday at 13:00 (IST) beginning 5 November 2017 and 9 December 2018 for 55 Episodes. The show features Sun TV television soap opera families in which the actors will compete in a number of entertainment based challenges.

== Hosted ==
- Diya Menon (2017–2018)
- Adhavan (2017–2018)

== List of Episodes ==
Serial	Telecast date
Deivamagal	19 November 2017
Venkat Prabu Team	31 December 2017
Priyamanaval	22 April 2018
