= Aandava Perumal =

2013 Indian film by Priyan

- Theatrical release poster
- Directed by: Priyan
- Produced by: R. Jana
- Starring: Shivan; Idhaya
- Cinematography: Robin N. Samuel
- Edited by: Priyan
- Music by: Ravi Chandran
- Production company: Parasakthi Cinemas
- Release date: 1 March 2013
- Country: India
- Language: Tamil

Aandava Perumal is a 2013 Indian Tamil-language film directed by Priyan, who previously directed Kottie (2010) and Vijaynagaram (2013), and starring Shivan and Eden Kuriakose

== Cast ==
- Shivan as Sarathy
- Idhaya as Anita
- Sasi as Ravi
- Lollu Sabha Jeeva
- Manimaran
- Girish

== Release and reception ==
The film released on 1 March 2013 along with six other films.

Malini Mannath of The New Indian Express opined that "A film you wouldn't mind watching once". A critic from The Times of India said that "Aandava Perumal is hampered by the stereotypes it portrays, and then wastes times untying these knots". A critic from Sify wrote that "The film less than 2 hours is a total waste of time".
