= Thuritham =

2023 Indian road film

- Theatrical release poster
- Directed by: V. Srinivasan
- Written by: V. Srinivasan
- Produced by: Thiruvarul Jeganathan
- Starring: Jegan; Eden Kuriakose
- Cinematography: D.S Vasan
- Edited by: Nagooran; Saravanan
- Music by: Songs: Isai Amuthan Athmasanthi; Score: Naresh
- Production company: Dream Focus Productions
- Release date: 2 June 2023
- Country: India
- Language: Tamil

Thuritham (transl. Fast) is a 2023 Indian Tamil-language road film written and directed by V. Srinivasan. The film stars Jegan and Eden Kuriakose with A. Venkatesh, Bala Saravanan, Poo Ramu and Ramachandran Durairaj in supporting roles. Thiruvarul Jeganathan produced it under the banner of Dream Focus Productions, with songs composed by Isai Amuthan Athmasanthi and background score by Naresh.

== Cast ==
- Jegan
- Eden Kuriakose
- A. Venkatesh
- Bala Saravanan
- Poo Ramu
- Ramachandran Durairaj
- Vaishali Taniga

== Production ==
The film was shot in Ulundurpettai, Chennai, Madurai, Coimbatore, and Salem. The film's cinematography was done by Vaasan, while Nagooran and Saravanan handled the editing of the film.

== Soundtrack ==
Isai Amuthan Athmasanthi composed the songs, and Naresh composed the background score.

Track listing
| No. | Title | Lyrics | Singer(s) | Length |
|---|---|---|---|---|
| 1. | "Nillamaley" | Gnanakaravel | Andrea Jeremiah | 4:50 |
| 2. | "Valaium Ulakathil" | Isai Amuthan Athmasanthi | Sharanya Subramaniam | 3:24 |
| Total length: | | | | 8:14 |

== Reception ==
The film was released in theaters on 2 June 2023. A critic from Dina Thanthi wrote that "Although the opening scenes are slow moving, the story gradually draws you in.".

A critic from Maalai Malar gave three stars out of five and wrote that "Director Srinivasan has made the real story lively through the screenplay. Although the opening scenes are slow moving, the story gradually draws you in."
