= Sathyaa =

1988 film by Suresh Krishna

- Theatrical release poster
- Directed by: Suresh Krissna
- Screenplay by: Kamal Haasan; Suresh Krishna
- Dialogues by: Ananthu
- Story by: Javed Akhtar
- Based on: Arjun (1985) by Rahul Rawail
- Produced by: Kamal Haasan
- Starring: Kamal Haasan; Amala
- Cinematography: S. M. Anwar
- Edited by: N. R. Kittu
- Music by: Ilaiyaraaja
- Production company: Raaj Kamal Films International
- Release date: 29 January 1988
- Running time: 147 minutes
- Country: India
- Language: Tamil
- Box office: ₹8 crore

Sathyaa is a 1988 Indian Tamil-language gangster film directed by Suresh Krissna in his directorial debut and produced by Kamal Haasan under Raaj Kamal Films International. A remake of the 1985 Hindi film Arjun, the film stars Kamal Haasan, Amala Akkineni, Rajesh, Janagaraj, Bahadoor and Kitty.

Sathyaa was released on 29 January 1988 and became one of the highest-grossing Tamil films of the year. Kitty won the Cinema Express Award for Best Villain Actor. A spiritual successor titled Dha Dha 87 was released in 2019.

== Plot ==
Sathyamurthy "Sathyaa" is an unemployed youth who and stays with his father Rajarathnam Mudaliar, the sole breadwinner for his family despite his old age, stepmother, who despises him, and stepsister Sudha, who adores him. One day, Sathyaa beats a group of rogues who are thrashing a tea vendor for not paying extortion money. These ruffians are the henchmen of a local goon named Rangan, who works for the local MLA Mariappa. With this incident, Sathya's life changes as he invokes Rangan's wrath. In retribution, Rangan and his men humiliate Sudha in public, forcing Sathya to thrash Rangan and destroy his bar. Meanwhile, Sathya falls in love with Geetha Nair, who works as a salesperson in a cloth shop.

Sathyaa begins to grab public attention as he and his friends start taking the law into their own hands, thrashing anyone who tries to break the law. Mariappa also learns about Sathyaa and thinks that he is working for his arch-rival Dhandapani, a social reformer. Mariappa orders that Sathyaa and his friends be eliminated. Mariappa's gang attacks and kills Sathya's friend Sundar in full public view. Though Sathyaa tries his best, no one comes forward to give witness to the murder out of fear, and the murderers are soon released due to lack of evidence. An enraged Sathyaa thrashes the murderers on their release and is arrested but is released on bail by Dhandapani.

Sathyaa's family disowns him for his activities, following which he is approached by Dhandapani, who convinces him to move to his own house and work for him. With Dhandapani's help, Sathyaa manages to have Sudha marry her boyfriend, the local Inspector; saves the marriage of his other stepsister by paying the dowry of ₹20,000 (equivalent to ₹250,000 or US$2,700 in 2026); and also ensuring that his father's employer treats his father with respect. Finally, Dhandapani tells Sathyaa to get some secret files and documents against Mariappa, which can be used to expose him in public. Risking his life, Sathyaa gets a hold of the files. Sathyaa later discovers that Dhandapani is corrupt and a double-crosser who used the evidence against Mariappa to join hands with him and contest in the upcoming election in his place. Sathyaa also learns that none of the evidence collected has been published anywhere.

Sathyaa further realizes that his services are no longer needed by Dhandapani, and is expelled from his house. Enraged and feeling betrayed, Sathyaa barges into a political meeting where Mariappa and Dhandapani are present and tries to expose Dhandapani but is forced out and thrashed by the workers of Mariappa's party. Some days later, Sathyaa sneaks into Dhandapani's house and takes the file containing evidence of both Mariappa's and Dhandapani's illegal activities. While running from Dhandapani's henchmen, Sathyaa gets shot and seriously injured but manages to survive and gets hospitalized. After regaining consciousness, Sathyaa learns that the evidence against Mariappa and Dhandapani is destroyed as he used the file as a shield against the gunshots. Sathyaa escapes from the hospital, confronts and kills both Mariappa and Dhandapani. He then sits awaiting the police.

== Cast ==
- Kamal Haasan as Sathyamurthy (Sathyaa)
- Amala as Geetha Nair
- Rajesh as Mariappa
- Janagaraj as Naidu
- Bahadoor as Rajarathnam Mudaliar (Sathyaa's father)
- Kaviyoor Ponnamma as Malayali shop owner
- Vadivukkarasi as Sathyaa's stepmother
- Indira as Radha, Sathyaa's sister
- Rasi as Sudha, Sathyaa's sister
- S. N. Parvathy as Radha's mother-in-law
- Munni
- Huma Khan as Chittu
- Nassar as Seena Thana
- Sundar as Sundar, Sathyaa's friend
- Anand as Anand, Sathyaa's friend
- Ravi Bharath as Sathyaa's friend
- Arun as Sathyaa's friend
- Kitty as Dhandapani (Voice dubbed by S. P. Balasubrahmanyam)
- Ramesh as Inspector Ravi
- Pradeep Shakthi as Pradeep, Dhandapani's henchman
- Azhagu as Azhagu, Mariappa's henchman
- T. K. S. Natarajan as Nair
- Idichapuli Selvaraj as the house owner
- Nellai Sarathy as the school teacher
- Sethu Vinayagam as Mariappa's assistant
- Shivaji as Anand's neighbour
- Jayaprakasam as Rangan
- Krishnan as the paint shop owner
- Sathyendran as a pickpocket

Guest appearances

- Vaali as Mariappa's associate
- Delhi Ganesh as Ramanathan
- Lakshmi Narayanan as Mariappa's associate

== Production ==
Sathyaa is a remake of the 1985 Hindi film Arjun. It marked the directorial debut of Suresh Krissna who earlier assisted K. Balachander. Krissna avoided creating a shot-for-shot remake of Arjun; according to him, "we took only basic theme from the original and worked on it". Kitty, who played one of the antagonists, had his voice dubbed by S. P. Balasubrahmanyam. The film was dedicated to M. G. Ramachandran, to whom Kamal Haasan considered it as "Guru Dakshina".

== Soundtrack ==
The soundtrack was composed by Ilaiyaraaja, and lyrics were penned by Vaali. The song "Valayosai" was initially intended for Ilaiyaraaja's studio album How to Name It?. It had been composed, but not recorded, and was included in Sathyaa at Haasan's insistence. After learning that Lata Mangeshkar would be visiting Madras to sing for another project, Haasan asked Krissna if she could also sing for Sathyaa. Krissna agreed, and the song was "Valayosai". As Mangeshkar did not know Tamil, Balasubrahmanyam helped her with diction. The song is set in Sindhu Bhairavi, a Carnatic raga. In May 2015, the FM radio station Radio City commemorated Ilaiyaraaja's 72nd birthday by broadcasting the composer's songs in a special show titled Raja Rajathan for 91 days. "Valaiyosai" was one of the most-requested songs on the show.

Track listing
No.	Title	Singer(s)	Length
1.	"Eley Thamizha"	T. Sunderrajan, Saibaba	4:29
2.	"Ingeyum" (not included in the film)	Lata Mangeshkar	4:15
3.	"Nagaru Nagaru"	Lalith Sahari, T. Sunderrajan, Saibaba	4:24
4.	"Potta Padiyudhu"	Kamal Haasan, T. Sunderrajan, Saibaba	4:50
5.	"Valaiyosai"	S. P. Balasubrahmanyam, Lata Mangeshkar	4:33
Total length:			22:31

== Release and reception ==
Sathyaa was released on 29 January 1988. Angela Joseph of Screen called Sathyaa "another gem in [Haasan's] mission for good cinema and acting. By shrewdly intertwining commercial ingredients with a good story and brilliant acting, Kamal is propagating love and appreciation for good cinema among the masses". Kitty won the Cinema Express Award for Best Villain Actor.

== Legacy ==
Haasan's looks as Sathyaa became a rage among the public. The 2017 film Sathya was titled after the 1988 film after its lead actor Sibi Sathyaraj got permission from Haasan. A spiritual successor to Sathyaa, Dha Dha 87, was released in 2019, and featured Janagaraj reprising his role. The protagonist in the web series Vaseegara is named Sathya and he also imitates Sathya in his dress and mannerisms.
