= Eden Kuriakose =

Indian actress and model

Eden Kuriakosse
- Occupations: Actress, model
- Years active: 2013–present

Eden Kuriakosse is an Indian actress and model who appears in Tamil, Telugu, and Malayalam films.

== Personal life ==
Eden was trained as a theater actress. She later pursued modelling and has won Miss Kerala, Miss Coimbatore titles and Miss South India finalist.

== Career ==
Eden Kuriakosse made her acting debut in 2013 with the Tamil film Aandava Perumal, and got her breakthrough with the 2014 Tamil supernatural romantic comedy Irukku Aana Illai.Also was the lead in 'panivizhum nilavu' Her next film was a Tamil-Malayalam bilingual titled Thiraikku varaatha kathai in Tamil and Girls in Malayalam. The film directed by Thulasidas featured only female artists and is the first all-women film in Indian cinema. She has seen in guest role in Ean Da Thalayil Ennavaikale. She has been signed to play the female lead in the upcoming Tamil film titled Narai, Manjal Vanam and Thittamittapadi.

== Filmography ==
†	Denotes films that have not yet been released

Year	Film	Role	Language	Notes
2013	Aandava Perumal	Anita	Tamil	Credited as Idhaya
2013	Panivizhum Nilavu	Maya	Tamil	
2014	Irukku Aana Illai	Divya and Kavya	Tamil	
2016	Kattumakkan	Malu	Malayalam	
2016	Srirastu Subhamastu	Siva's lover	Telugu	
2016	Girls; Thiraikku Varatha Kadhai	Rehana	Malayalam; Tamil	Bilingual film
2017	Maya Thirrai	Sandhya	Tamil	web series on ALTBalaji
2018	Yenda Thalaiyila Yenna Vekkala	Deenavyashini	Tamil	
2019	Zhagaram	Sneha	Tamil	
2021	Kuruthi Kalam	Subbulakshmi	Tamil	web series on MX Player
2023	Thuritham		Tamil	
2025	Pallavapuram Manai Enn 666		Tamil	
