= Iru Dhuruvam season 2 =

Iru Dhuruvam
- Season 2
- Starring: Nandaa; Prasanna; Abhirami Venkatachalam; Linga; Sai Priyanka Ruth; Abdool Lee
- No. of episodes: 10

Release
- Original network: SonyLIV
- Original release: 24 February 2023

Iru Dhuruvam 2 (இரு துருவம் 2) is a 2023 Indian Tamil-language crime thriller streaming television series, written and directed by Arun Prakash, produced as an Original for SonyLIV under the banner of Applause Entertainment and Sign Of Life Productions.

It is a Sequel to the 2019 series Iru Dhuruvam. It stars Nandaa, Prasanna, Abhirami Venkatachalam, Linga, Sai Priyanka Ruth and Abdool Lee. Music by Rudhraa Velu. The ten episode series premiered on SonyLIV on 24 February 2023.

== Cast ==
- Nandaa as Viktor Selladurai
- Prasanna as Lankeswaran
- Abhirami Venkatachalam as Geetha
- Linga
- Sai Priyanka Ruth as Abilasha
- Abdool Lee as Kishore

== Production ==
=== Development ===
The announcement of the renewal of the series for the second season was made in October 2021. The shooting of the series began in 2022. The series is produced by Sameer Nair under the production Applause Entertainment, writer and director by Arun Prakash.Music by Rudhraa Velu.

=== Release ===
The first trailer was released on 19 February 2023.
