= Maya Thirrai =

- Genre: Thriller
- Screenplay by: Kaushik Narasimhan
- Story by: U Kirthana
- Directed by: Kaushik Narasimhan
- Creative director: Yubraaj Bhattacharya (ALT Balaji)
- Starring: See Below
- Composers: John Britto; Senjulakshmi
- Country of origin: India
- Original language: Tamil
- No. of seasons: 1
- No. of episodes: 16

Production
- Producer: Kutty Padmini
- Production locations: Mumbai, India; Quebec City, Canada; Niagara Falls, Canada
- Cinematography: R. Parthipan Krishna
- Editor: M. Ramesh Baarathi
- Camera setup: Multi-camera
- Running time: 18-22 minutes
- Production company: Vaishnavi Media Works Limited

Original release
- Network: ALT Balaji
- Release: 30 April – 13 August 2017

Maya Thirrai is a 2017 Indian Tamil-language streaming television series that premiered on 30 April 2017 and 13 August 2017 on ALTBalaji. The series has been available for streaming on the ALT Balaji app and its associated websites since its release date.

== Plot ==
The series revolves around Prakash and Sandhya. Sandhya has everything that ever girl desires but something felt missing. After years of waiting, she meets Prakash, a handsome widower who came with a promise of all she ever wanted. Little did she know that her picture-perfect marriage was nothing but an illusion. The series explores a mysterious grandmother, an autistic twin, a seductress, and a chilling supernatural vibe that makes a thrilling story.

== Cast ==
- Nandha Durairaj as Prakash
- Eden Kuriakose as Sandhya
- Lakshmi Priyaa Chandramouli as Priya
- Sanjana Singh as Thaara

== Episodes ==
- Episode 1: Mistaken identity
- Episode 2: I am in Love
- Episode 3: Please Marry Me
- Episode 4: Someone's Watching
- Episode 5: Twin Terror
- Episode 6: Am I Safe Here?
- Episode 7: Please Believe Me
- Episode 8: Enough Is Enough
- Episode 9: Who is Thaara?
- Episode 10: Sudden Death
- Episode 11: Next Target
- Episode 12: Run for Life
- Episode 13: Killer... Revealed
- Episode 14: Love at first sight
- Episode 15: How Priya Died
- Episode 16: Season Finale: Not the End
