= Dha Dha 87 =

2019 Indian film by Vijay Sri G

- Theatrical release poster
- Directed by: Vijay Sri G
- Written by: Vijay Sri G
- Produced by: Kalai Selvan M
- Starring: Charuhasan; Saroja; Janagaraj
- Cinematography: Raja Pandi
- Edited by: Sri Vatsan
- Music by: Leander Lee Marty
- Production company: Kalai Cinemas
- Release date: 1 March 2019
- Country: India
- Language: Tamil

Dha Dha 87 is a 2019 Indian Tamil-language action romantic drama film written and directed by Vijay Sri G. The film stars Charuhasan and Saroja. The film is a spiritual successor to Sathyaa (1988), which starred Charuhasan's younger brother Kamal Haasan. Janagaraj reprises his role from the original. The film was released on 1 March 2019.

== Plot ==
The film begins with the police receiving word that Pandi was discovered dead near a railroad track. The narration is followed by a flashback. Pandi is a fellow who easily gets attracted to women. Jeni is coming to the same area, near Pandi's residence. He falls in love with Jeni, and he keeps following her and proposing to her. Jeni's father, Naidu, knows about Pandi following Jeni. Naidu becomes enraged by Pandi after filing a police complaint and receiving no action. Some local politicians approach Pandi and tell him they will convince her, but they play a political game using him. The guys tell Pandi to tie the mangalsutra and we'll take care of it later, and a face-covered guy orders one of the guys to try an acid attack. The people around the place misunderstand Pandi as the one who has thought about an acid attack, and they beat Pandi. Knowing about an acid attack attempt, Naidu gets more angry with Pandi and confides in Sathyamoorthy, a local don. Pandi's father visits Naidu's house and tells them Pandi has no relation to the acid attacker; he also requests that Jeni meet Pandi and talk to him, but Naidu and Jeni don't accept. After that, Pandi goes missing, and Jeni requests Naidu to release him. Pandi is kidnapped by Sathyamoorthy's henchmen, and they beat him. Sathyamoorthy sees a photo of Geetha's relative and Pandi's mother, so he orders his henchmen to leave him and let him go. Sathyamoorthy remembers his lover, Geetha. Sathyamoorthy's henchman finds that Geetha and Sathyamoorthy are both single, so they try to unite them. Pandi meets Jeni in a coffee shop, and when he tells her to love him, at first she refuses, and she wants to tell him something, but he interrupts and says no one likes him, so she tells him that she likes him. He asked, "Come, let's take a selfie," so she came to take a selfie, but he kissed her on the lips. She is happy and said she is transgender, and her real name is Jagannathan. She has not even had an operation to make her a girl. He then goes to the restroom and uses phenyl to clean his mouth after kissing a transgender person. He starts to hate Jeni. She meets him on the terrace and expresses her love, but Pandi asks her to leave him. He asks her to break up with him, but she blackmails him, saying if he refuses to marry her, she will tag a video of her being transgender in the kissing video that went viral on Facebook. Pandi accidentally uses drugs, and when Jeni comes there, he scolds her to stay out of his life. Jeni slaps him and goes to her house, where she tries to kill herself. Naidu arrives and saves her, explaining that this is why he has never allowed Pandi to be near her. He gets nightmares about being trolled by his friends because his lover is transgender. Pandi talks to a transgender woman to learn about her body, and then he climbs a pipe attached to Jeni's house to see Jeni get undressed. He is shocked to see her body and sobs. He runs away to commit suicide, so he stands in the railroad tracks, expecting to be hit by a train. He slipped and swooned when a train came by. (Flashback ends)

Present

The police came there and checked him, and they found that he was still alive. Muttai, his close friend, arrived and wept, saying Jeni had told the truth about her. Pandi is waiting at the bus stand for the bus to go to work. An autorickshaw arrived, and he discovered that Sathyamoorthy and Geetha were married. Pandi chastises Geetha for marrying in old age when everyone is looking for her. Geetha and Sathya say it's not about a physical relationship; it's for love only, and they say they don't care what others think. The car drives away, and it begins to rain. In the rain, one old man and his sick wife came, and the old guy took care of his wife. Pandi saw the old couple's love, and he realized love. He tried to call Jeni using his phone, but she came there, so he started to propose to her. Seeing him propose, she covered her face with her hands out of shyness. The film ends with a voiceover saying that Jeni got shy because of Pandi, so Jeni became a girl.

== Cast ==
- Charuhasan as Sathyamoorthy
- Janagaraj as Naidu
- KPY Anand Kumar as Jail Pandi
- Sri Pallavi as Jeni
- Saroja as Geetha
- Manoj Kumar as MLA
- Bala Singh as Speed
- Yaanai Joke Kathir as Muttai
- G. Marimuthu as Pandi's father
- Vijay Sri G as SI Kaattaan
- Rahul Thatha as Prem
- Navin Vishal
- Pugazh as Drunkard

== Production ==
The film titled Dha Dha 87 resembles that the lead actors Charuhasan (aged 87) and Saroja (aged 80) are playing the prominent roles in the film. The filmmakers roped in three newcomers, including Kalakka Povathu Yaaru? fame Anand Pandi, Sri Pallavi and Anupallavi who would play supportive roles in the film.

== Soundtrack ==
Dha Dha 87

Soundtrack album by Leander Lee Marty
- Released: 12 August 2018
- Genre: Feature film soundtrack
- Length: 28:07
- Label: Divo

Leander Lee Marty chronology
| Dha Dha 87 (2018) | Powder (2022) |

Track listing
| No. | Title | Singer(s) | Length |
|---|---|---|---|
| 1. | "Aaradi Andavan" | Naresh Iyer, Vijay Sri G | 3ː38 |
| 2. | "Oru Nimisham Thala Sutthiduchchi" | V. M. Mahalingam | 2ː56 |
| 3. | "Dha Dha 87 theme" | Vijay Sri G | 1:29 |
| 4. | "Thalaiva" | Anand Aravindakshan, Shenbagaraj Ganesalingam | 4:02 |
| 5. | "Venmegam" | Priyanka N K | 3:57 |
| 6. | "Ne Vilagi" | Anand Aravindakshan, Sruthy Sasidharan | 4:13 |
| 7. | "Ava En Aalu" | Velmurugan | 3:52 |
| 8. | "Wine Kannala" | Diwakar, Gaana Vinod | 4:00 |

== Release ==
A poster which was released on 9 January 2019 confirmed the official release date of the film as 25 January with a sentence spoofing Petta and Viswasam which are regarded as two biggest Tamil film releases of 2019. However, the film was eventually released on 1 March the same year.

== Reception ==
Thinkal Menon of The Times of India rated the film two out of five stars and wrote, "Though the film has a laid-back narration with unwanted songs and ineffective emotion scenes of Pandi, what makes it watchable is Pallavi’s characterisation and performance". Srivatsan S of The Hindu wrote, "A problematic premise, a bunch of homophobic jokes, and an ambitious effort to tarnish the reputation that Charuhasan and Janagaraj have built over the years". Anjana Shekar of The News Minute wrote, "The film is a tangled mess of pseudo-activism that is presented with a terrible lack of understanding of gender and sexuality".
