= Powder (2022 film) =

2022 Tamil language thriller film

- Promotional poster
- Directed by: Vijay Sri G
- Written by: Vijay Sri G
- Produced by: Jaya Sree Vijay
- Starring: Vidya Pradeep; Nikil Murukan; Shantini Deva; Vijay Sri G
- Cinematography: Raja Pandi
- Edited by: Guna
- Music by: Leander Lee Marty
- Production company: G Media
- Release date: 25 November 2022
- Country: India
- Language: Tamil

Powder is a 2022 Indian Tamil-language thriller film written and directed by Vijay Sri G and starring Vidya Pradeep, Nikil Murukan and Shantini Deva. It was released on 25 November 2022.

== Cast ==
- Vidya Pradeep as Vidya
- Nikil Murukan as Raghavan
- Shantini Deva
- Vijay Sri G as Pattarai
- Motta Rajendran
- Singampuli
- Vaiyapuri as Samy
- Aadhavan
- Anithra Nair
- Silimisam Siva
- Viki

== Production ==
The film was launched in October 2020 with Vidya Pradeep announced to play the lead role. The director Vijay Sri G, who earlier made Dha Dha 87 (2019), started Powder after his other film Pollatha Ulagil Bayangara Game entered the post-production phase. Nikil Murukan, a noted public relations officer in Tamil cinema, accepted terms to work as an actor in the film. It became his first full-fledged acting role following a number of cameo appearances. He requested Vijay Sri to name his character as Raghavan to reference the popular police officer portrayed by Kamal Haasan in Vettaiyaadu Vilaiyaadu (2006). Explaining the relevance of the title to the film, Vijay said, "There are several people who wear makeup to their hearts and are known for their double standards. That is why I decided to keep Powder as the title".

== Soundtrack ==
Soundtrack was composed by Leander Lee Marty.

- Ratha Ther – Leander Lee Marty
- Saayam Pona – Velmurugan, Sruthi Sasidharan
- No Soodu No Soranai – Gana Bala

== Release and reception ==
Powder was released on 25 November 2022. Ram Venkat Srikar from Cinema Express wrote it was "a mirthless film with hardly any redemptive qualities" and that the film "reeks of amateur writing and abysmal craft". He added "the end result of Powder only manages to leave us with a poor aftertaste, especially with the film's ridiculous attempt at shocking the viewer coming in lieu of engaging and palatable cinema". In contrast, a reviewer from Maalai Malar gave Powder a positive review, noting that it was worth a watch.
