= Vanakkam Tamizha =

- Genre: Talk show
- Written by: Jeevarajan
- Screenplay by: Justin Jeyaraj
- Directed by: N.Sundaraeshwaran (Episode:1-160); Rajesh Sinhaa (Episodes:161-1605)
- Creative director: Sudharasan
- Presented by: Aswath; Anjalin; Aarthi Subash; Sambhavi Gurumoorthy; Vj Rakesh; Bavithra; Vj Nikki; Former Host; Sangeetha Sai; Aniruth; Anitha Sampath; astika; Azhar; Shali Nivekas; Uma; Aishwarya; Pujitha Devaraju; Diya Menon
- Theme music composer: C. Sathya
- Opening theme: Vanakam Tamizha by Sid Sree Ram
- Country of origin: India
- Original language: Tamil
- No. of seasons: 02
- No. of episodes: 1610

Production
- Editor: Sridhar
- Camera setup: Multi-camera
- Running time: approx.1. Hour per episode
- Production company: SunNetwork

Original release
- Network: Sun TV
- Release: 4 December 2017

Vanakkam Tamizha is a 2017 Tamil-language live morning Talk show which airs on Sun TV from 4 December 2017 on Monday to Friday at 8:00 AM (IST). The show includes news, weather reports, kitchen tips, entertainment and technology and sports. The show is hosted by Aswath, Anjalin, Aarthi Subash, Sambhavi Gurumoorthy, VJ Rakesh, Bavithra and VJ Nikki.

== List of episodes ==
2017

Episodes	Celebrity	Notes	Telecast date
01	Vijay Antony விஜய் அந்தோணி	is a South Indian playback singer, music composer, actor and producer working in the Tamil and Telugu film industries.	4 December 2017
02	Remya Nambeesan ரம்யா நம்பீசன்	is a South Indian film actress and playback singer who appears in Tamil, Malayalam, Telugu and Kannada Languages Films.	5 December 2017
03	Nakul நகுல்	is a Tamil film actor and playback singer.	6 December 2017
04	Sanchita Shetty சஞ்சிதா	is a South Indian film actress who has appeared in Tamil, Kannada and Telugu films.	7 December 2017
05	Sibi Sathyaraj சிபி	is a Tamil film actor	8 December 2017
06	Janani Iyer ஜனனி ஐயர்	is an Indian actress and model who predominantly appears in Tamil and Malayalam movies.	11 December 2017
07	K. S. Ravikumar கே. எஸ். ரவிகுமார்	is an Indian film director and actor, primarily working in Tamil cinema.	12 December 2017
08	D. Imman டி. இமான்	is an Indian film composer and singer, predominantly working in the Tamil film industry.	13 December 2017
09	Sundeep Kishan சந்தீப் கிசன்	is an Indian film actor, who known for his works primarily in Telugu and Tamil films.	14 December 2017
10	Venkat Prabhu வெங்கட் பிரபு	is an Indian filmmaker, who has worked as an actor, director and playback singer in the Tamil film industry.	15 December 2017
11	Gayathrie காயத்ரி	is a Tamil film actress.	18 December 2017
12	Aditi Balan அதிதி பாலன்	is a Tamil film actress.	19 December 2017
13	Vivek விவேக்	is an Indian film actor, comedian, television personality, playback singer and activist working in the Tamil film industry.	20 December 2017
14	Aari ஆறி	is a Tamil film actor	21 December 2017
15	VTV Ganesh வி டீ.வி கணேஷ்	is an Indian actor, comedian and film producer.	22 December 2017
16	R. Parthiepan பார்த்திபன்	is an Indian film actor, director, producer and writer who works mainly in Tamil cinema.	25 December 2017
17	Krishna கிரிஷ்னா	is a Tamil film actor	26 December 2017

== Hosting ==
The show is hosted by Sangeetha, Bavithra, Aniruth, Anitha Sampath, Sastika, Azhar, Shali and more recently by Uma Punjabagesan, Aishwarya Muthushivam, Pujitha Devaraju and Diya Menon.

== Adaptations ==
This is the original version and the remakes which are given listed below.

Language	Title	Original Release	Network(s)
Kannada	Namaste Karnataka	16 November 2020 – 5 February 2021	Udaya TV
