= Aadhavan (anchor) =

Tamil Indian artist and actor

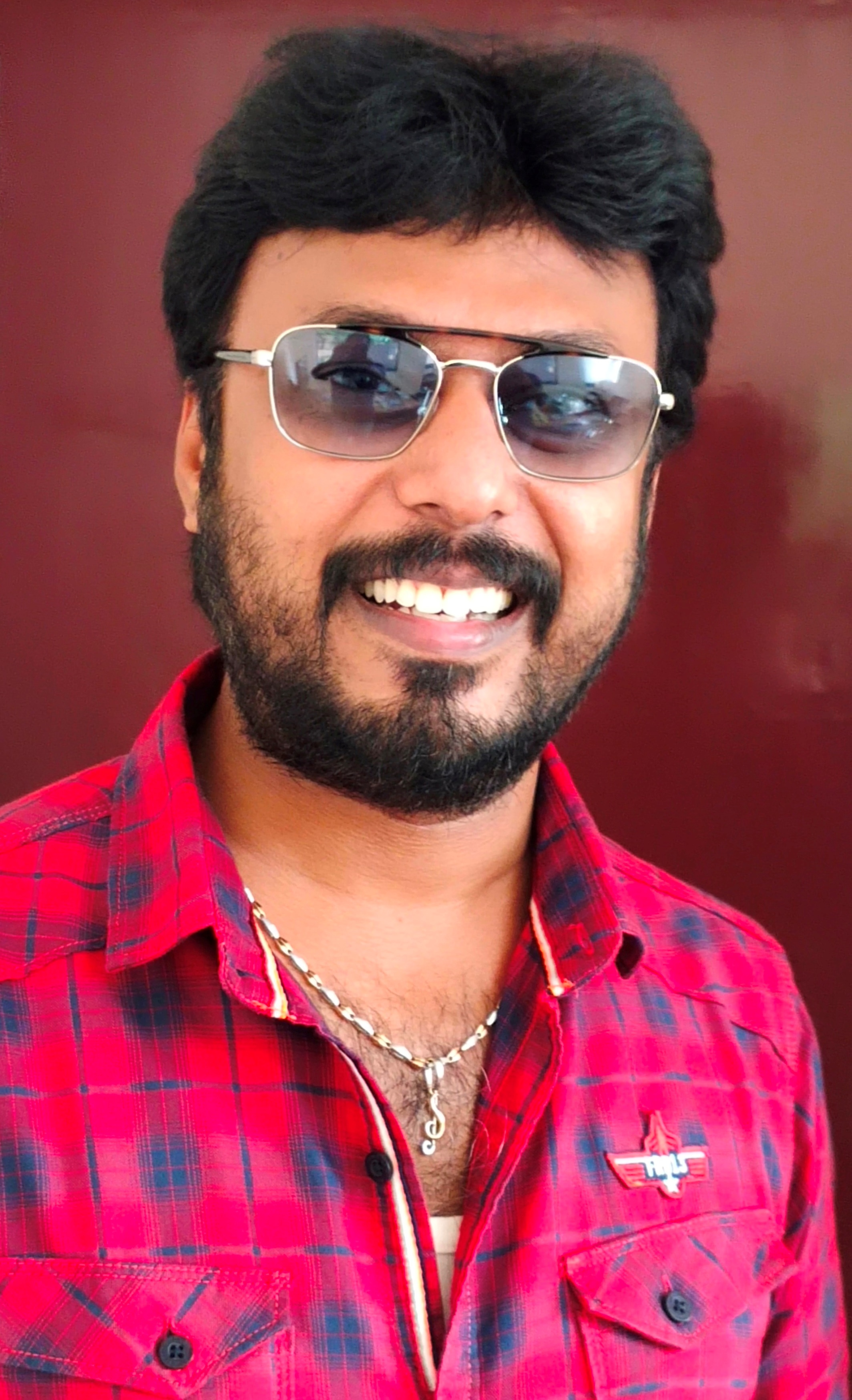
- Aadhavan
- Born: Adhavan Umavathy Kesavamurthi; Thanjavur, Tamil Nadu, India
- Education: SRM Institute of Science and Technology, Kattankulathur
- Occupations: Film actor, Radio Jockey, video jockey, mimicry artist
- Years active: 2005 – current
- Known for: Vocals

Adhavan Umavathy Kesavamurthi, known professionally as Aadhavan, is an Indian mimicry artist and actor known for his work in Tamil television and films. He has been working as an RJ (Radio Jockey) and VJ (Video Jockey), in Tamil Nadu. He has made appearances in television comedy shows including Konjam Nadinga Boss, Super Challenge, Comedy Junction, Savaale Samaali, Galatta Rani, Lollu Pa, and Maanga Idiots.

== Career ==
=== Radio jockey ===
After completing his higher studies in Electrical and Electronics, Aadhavan worked in the banking, and information technology (IT) sectors. A turning point in his professional career came, when Sujith Kumar, HR Head of Infosys and, Founder of Maatram Foundation, invited Aadhavan to perform mimicry during a cultural program at Infosys, Chennai. Shiva, who was working in Radio Mirchi, was the chief guest of that cultural function, where Aadhavan performed mimicry with variety of voices. Impressed by his performance, Shiva invited Aadhavan to join Radio Mirchi as RJ (Radio Jockey). In 2007, Aadhavan, then, started a new career at Radio Mirchi as RJ, and also hosted a show Kollyudans, where instant updates, interviews, special shows, and information about newly released movies were given to listeners.

=== Video jockey ===
While Aadhavan was working at Radio Mirchi, he participated as a contestant in Kalakka Povathu Yaaru? (KPY), Season 4, a Tamil language comedy reality TV show on Vijay TV in 2008. With his ability to mimic voices of celebrities and sense of humor, Aadhavan was adjudged as the title winner of Kalakka Povathu Yaaru Season 4. Participation in Kalakka Povathu Yaaru gave him an opportunity to show his skills. Aadhavan's talent was noticed by a leading Tamil channel Adithya TV. When Adithya TV, a 24-hour Tamil comedy channel of Sun TV Network was launched on 8 February 2009, Aadhavan was invited to join and host comedy program. He, then, joined Aditya TV on 15 February 2009, and remained in the Sun TV Network for more than a decade. Aadhavan hosted a comedy show called Konjam Nadinga Boss on Adithya TV. This show is the first one of its kind in which random strangers were asked to repeat famous movie dialogues with similar tone as the actor in the movie, and turns it into a comedy. This show made Aadhavan popular.

Aadhavan was chosen to be one of the Judges sharing the space with Madurai Muthu for Comedy Junction, which is a Tamil-language comedy talk show broadcast on Sun TV. He presented a number of live shows including Vaanga Sirikalaam and Idhudhaanda Sirippu. Aadhavan has also anchored some of the super hit shows namely Natchathiram, Super Challenge and Savaale Samaali (Sun TV), Galatta Rani (Kalaignar TV) and Sun Kudumba Virudhugal 2019. Aadhavan was one of the judges of Kalakka Povadhu Yaaru Season 9 on Vijay TV, which marked his return to Vijay TV after a gap of 11 years.

=== Film career ===
His association with celebrities, along with his mimicry skills, have helped Aadhavan to make an entry into Tamil film industry as an actor and an assistant director. Aadhavan lent his voice to Raghuvaran, after his demise, for the 2008 Tamil film Ellam Avan Seyal . He also lent voice for a Golden Retriever in the movie Enga Kattula Mazhai (2018). In the beginning, Aadhavan started his career as an assistant director with Dharani, one of the directors in Tamil movies, and also worked for 3 (2012).

== Filmography ==
Year	Film	Role	Notes	Ref
2013	Onbadhule Guru			
2013	Biriyani			
2014	Madhavanum Malarvizhiyum			
2014	Irukku Aana Illai	Meenakshi Sundaram		
2015	Rombha Nallavan Da Nee		Special appearance	
2015	Manadhil Oru Maatram			
2015	Chikkiku Chikkikkichu	Venky		
2015	Sandamarutham	Aadhavan		
2016	Ka Ka Ka Po		Lead role	
2016	Ennama Katha Vudranunga			
2017	12-12-1950	Ejamaan		
2021	Eeswaran	Mayakannan		
2021	Ikk			
2022	Narai Ezhuthum Suyasaritham			
2022	Powder			
2024	Haraa			
2024	Jolly O Gymkhana	LIC Agent Dhandapani		
2025	EMI			
2025	Nirvaagam Porupalla			

=== Television series ===
Year	Title	Role	Channel	Notes	Ref.
2020–2021	Amman	Dr. Vinoth	Colors Tamil		
2021	Idhayathai Thirudathe	Himself	Colors Tamil	Special appearance	
