= Iru Dhuruvam (TV series) =

Indian web series

- Official poster
- Genre: Crime thriller
- Written by: M Kumaran
- Directed by: M Kumaran
- Starring: Nandha Durairaj; Abdool; Sebastin Antony; Abhirami Venkatachalam
- Music by: Surya Prasadh R
- Country of origin: India
- Original language: Tamil
- No. of seasons: 1
- No. of episodes: 9 (list of episodes)

Production
- Producers: Sameer Nair; Pramod Cheruvalath
- Cinematography: Raja K Bakthavatchalam
- Editors: Karthik Ram; Ashwath Shivkumar
- Production companies: Applause Entertainment; A Sign Of Life Productions

Original release
- Network: SonyLIV
- Release: 29 September 2019

Iru Dhuruvam (transl. Two Poles) is an Indian Tamil-language crime thriller streaming television series produced as an Original for SonyLIV, written and directed by debutant M Kumaran. Produced by Sameer Nair and Pramod Cheruvalath under the banner Applause Entertainment and A Sign Of Life Productions, the series stars Nandha Durairaj in the lead role along with Abdool, Sebastin Antony and Abhirami Venkatachalam. The series marked the first Tamil Original streaming series produced for SonyLIV and the first season released on 29 September 2019 with nine episodes. On 24 February 2023 a second season consisting of 10 episodes was released. Season 2.

== Cast ==
- Nandha Durairaj as Viktor Selladurai
- Abdool as Kishore
- Sebastin Antony as Gunasekaran
- Abhirami Venkatachalam as Geetha
- Jeeva Ravi as Rangaraj Tripathi
- P. Aneesha as Gayathri
- Ajit Koshy as Manova Devanesan
- Balaji as Prabhakaran
- Nandhini Madhesh as Keerthana
- Karthik Nagarajan as Tech guy

== Reception ==
The series opened to extreme positive reviews from critics. Sify said, "Iru Dhuruvam does finally manage to achieve what it set out to and for one definitely hope to see Viktor and Kishore in Season 2 pretty soon!" Republic World wrote, "Iru Dhuruvam is a crime thriller that consists of the common elements of the genre but still manages to keep you hooked to your screen because of the deft direction by M Kumaran. The story grabs your attention with its edge of the seat narrative." Binged.com gave a rating of 6 out on 10 and called the series a reasonably sharp Psycho-Thriller.

== Series overview ==
Season	No. of episodes	Original release	
Season	No. of episodes	First aired	Last aired
01	9	29 September 2019	

l

== Episodes ==
=== Season 1 ===
No. overall	No. in season	Title	Directed by	Written by	Original release date
1	1	"The Homicide Of A Young Woman"	M Kumaran	M Kumaran	29 September 2019
2	2	"A New Lead For Viktor"	M Kumaran	M Kumaran	29 September 2019
3	3	"A New Victim"	M Kumaran	M Kumaran	29 September 2019
4	4	"Scrutinizing The Past Records"	M Kumaran	M Kumaran	29 September 2019
5	5	"Viktor Receives A Warning"	M Kumaran	M Kumaran	29 September 2019
6	6	"Finding Potential Evidences"	M Kumaran	M Kumaran	29 September 2019
7	7	"Viktor Gets Flabbergasted"	M Kumaran	M Kumaran	29 September 2019
8	8	"An Eye On The Killer"	M Kumaran	M Kumaran	29 September 2019
9	9	"Mind Games"	M Kumaran	M Kumaran	29 September 2019
