= Nandaa =

Indian actor

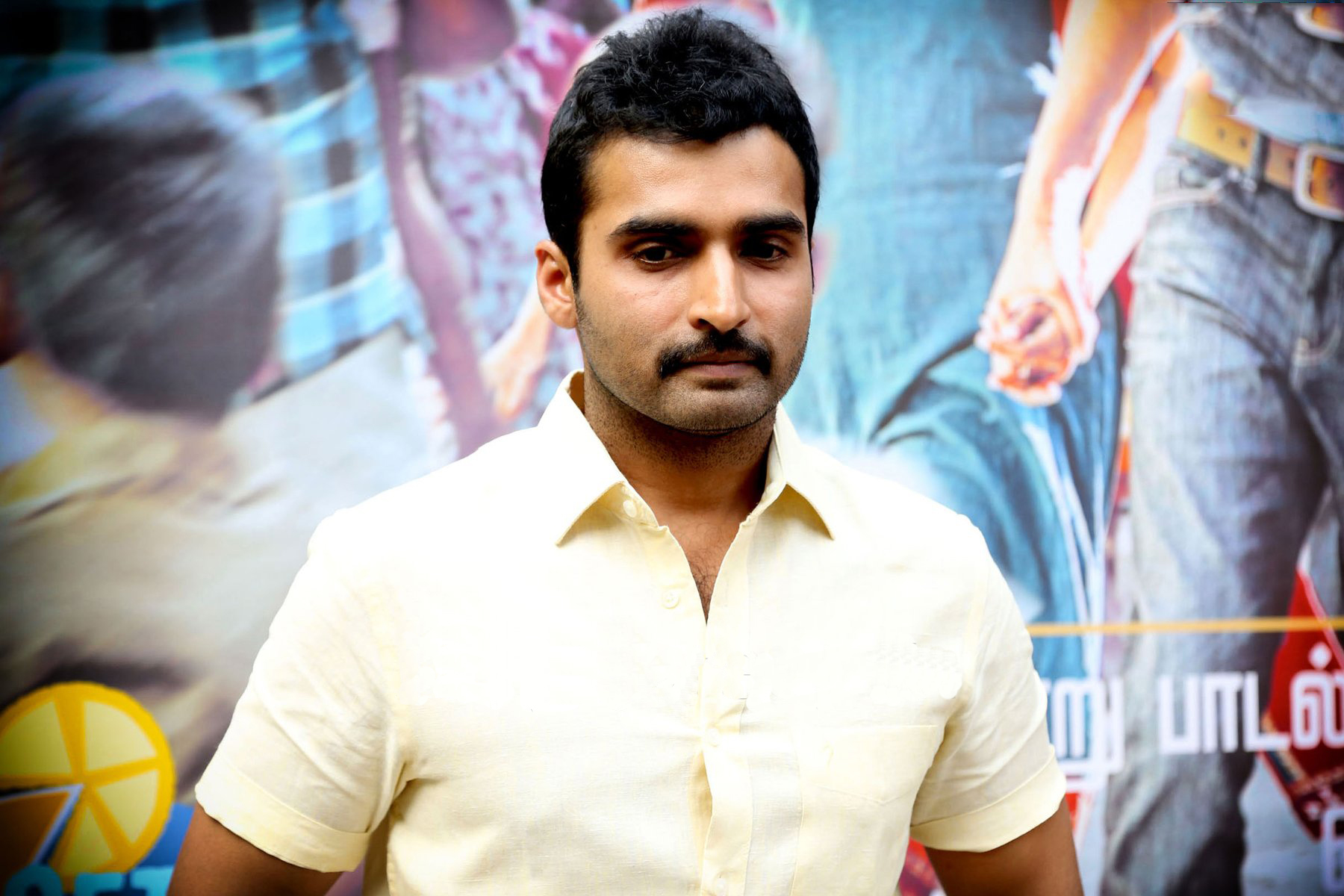
- Actor Nandaa at the Athithi Audio Launch
- Born: Govind Sendrampalayam Durairaj; Coimbatore, Tamil Nadu, India
- Occupations: Actor, voice actor, producer
- Years active: 1997–present
- Spouse: Vidya Rupa (m. 2013)
- Children: 1

Nandaa Dorairaj is an Indian actor, producer who primarily works in Tamil films. He made his debut in Mounam Pesiyadhe (2002) and later appeared in other films such as Eeram (2009).

== Early life ==
Nandaa Dorairaj was born as Govind Durairaj in Coimbatore to Durairaj and Rani. He has a younger brother Karthik and is the grandson of former Union minister M. Kannappan.

== Personal life ==
Nandaa married Vidyaroopa in 2013.

== Career ==
He was spotted by producer S. Thanu during his family function. In 1998, he joined the Film Institute in Chennai and obtained a diploma in acting after a one-year course. He first signed up to star in a project titled Enna Solla Pogirai opposite Gayathri Raguram, but the film was later stalled. He made his debut in 2002 with the movie Mounam Pesiyadhe along with Suriya and Trisha Krishnan by film director Ameer. Director Ameer was looking for a cheerful and well built hero to play the co-role with Suriya. Nandhaa immediately fit the criteria and was therefore selected for the role. Punnagai Poove in 2003, showed him as a full-time hero. In 2005, he acted in Selvam. In a freak mishap, he suffers an injury on his head and he forgets all about his past. Nandha playing a confused youth has given a good and matured performance. Donning a tricky character. In 2006, he appeared in two movies as Kodambakkam and Aanivaer. He play in action film, Agaram (2007). The film was released to positive reviews. Followed by Urchagam (2007).

His movie Eeram (2009) was a hit produced by director S. Shankar. Following the success of Eeram, director Shankar again cast him in his production for the second time in Anandhapurathu Veedu (2010), directed by Naga. Then he starred alongside Jiiva in Vanthaan Vendraan (2011). He starred in Vellore Maavattam (2011), in which he played a cop. After two years without movies, Nandha became an action hero in movies as Athithi (2014), Katham Katham (2015), Adhibar (2015) and Kallaattam (2016). In 2018 again after Mounam Pesiyadhe, he starred alongside Suriya in Thaana Serndha Kootam directed by Vignesh Shivan for studio green productions, which turned out to be a success. He has also been starred in a web series produced by Ekta Kapoor for Balaji teleflims which was Tamil s first web series directed by Kaushik. The next is Zhagaram (2019) the adventure thriller film. Nandha who plays Akhilan is very fit and passes off as a young man quite convincingly and lends authenticity to the role of the reluctant treasure hunter. In 2020, he acted as dual roles in Vaanam Kottatum.

== Filmography ==
=== Actor ===
Films

Year	Film	Role	Notes
2002	Mounam Pesiyadhe	Kannan	
2003	Punnagai Poove	Venkat	
2005	Selvam	Selvam (Kannan)	
2006	Kodambakkam	Sugavannan	
2006	Aanivaer	Nandha	
2007	Agaram	Thiru	
2007	Urchagam	Ganesh	
2009	Eeram	Balakrishnan Egambaram	Nominated, Vijay Award for Best Villain
2010	Anandhapurathu Veedu	Balasubramaniyam (Bala)	
2011	Vanthaan Vendraan	Ramana	
2011	Vellore Maavattam	ASP Muthukumar IPS	
2014	Athithi	Madhiazhagan	
2015	Katham Katham	SI Nandha	
2015	Adhibar	David	
2016	Kallaattam	Thamizh	
2018	Thaana Serndha Kootam	Inspector Vetrivel	
2019	Zhagaram	Akhilan	
2020	Vaanam Kottatum	Baskaran, Natrayan	
2021	Paramapadham Vilayattu	Tamizhselvan	

=== Television ===
Year	Show	Role	Channel	Notes
1997	Premi	Govind		Episode 18
2017	Maya Thirrai			
2019	Iru Dhuruvam	Viktor	SonyLIV	Web Series
2021	Survivor Tamil	Participant	Zee Tamil	10th Voted out
2023	Iru Dhuruvam 2	Viktor	SonyLIV	Web Series
2024	Snakes and Ladders	Chezhiyan	Amazon Prime Video	Web Series

=== Dubbing artist ===
Year	Film	Actor	Notes
2014	J. C. Daniel	Prithviraj	Tamil version of Malayalam film Celluloid

=== Producer ===
Year	Title	Notes
2018–2019	Sun Naam Oruvar	Sun TV show
2022	Laththi	
