= Apoorva Sagodharargal (1989 film) =

1989 film by Singeetam Srinivasa Rao

- Theatrical release poster
- Directed by: Singeetam Srinivasa Rao
- Screenplay by: Kamal Haasan; Crazy Mohan (dialogues)
- Story by: Panchu Arunachalam
- Produced by: Kamal Haasan
- Starring: Kamal Haasan; Jaishankar; Nagesh; Gautami
- Cinematography: P. C. Sriram
- Edited by: B. Lenin; V. T. Vijayan
- Music by: Ilaiyaraaja
- Production company: Raaj Kamal Films International
- Release date: 14 April 1989
- Running time: 150–157 minutes (Note: While the runtime is listed in G. Dhananjayan's The Best of Tamil Cinema as 150 minutes, the Encyclopaedia of Indian Cinema by Ashish Rajadhyaksha and Paul Willemen says 157 minutes.)
- Country: India
- Language: Tamil

Apoorva Sagodharargal (transl. Unique Siblings) is a 1989 Indian Tamil-language masala film directed by Singeetam Srinivasa Rao. The film features an ensemble cast including Kamal Haasan, Jaishankar, Nagesh, Gautami, Rupini, Manorama, Srividya, Janagaraj, Moulee, Delhi Ganesh and Nassar. The plot centres on the twins Raju and Appu, who were separated during childhood, and Appu's quest for revenge against the criminals who killed his father.

Apoorva Sagodharargal was produced by Haasan under the production company Raaj Kamal Films International. The film was written by Panchu Arunachalam, while Haasan and Crazy Mohan wrote the screenplay and dialogues, respectively. B. Lenin and V. T. Vijayan handled editing, and P. C. Sriram served as cinematographer. The music for the film was composed by Ilaiyaraaja, with lyrics by Vaali.

Apoorva Sagodharargal premiered at the International Film Festival of India. The film was theatrically released on 14 April 1989 and was a major box office success, completing a 200-day run in theatres and becoming the highest grossing Tamil film at that time. It won the Filmfare Award for Best Film – Tamil, and two Tamil Nadu State Film Awards: Best Actor (Haasan) and Best Lyricist (Vaali).

== Plot ==
Sethupathi is an honest police officer living with his pregnant wife Kaveri. During a routine raid, he uncovers an illegal crime racket involving corrupt businessmen Dharmaraj, Francis Anbarasu, Nallasivam and Satyamoorthy. He publicly arrests them, humiliating them, but they soon escape justice and vow revenge.

The four men and their goons later ambush Sethupathi and Kaveri, tying them up and forcing Kaveri to drink poison. Sethupathi fights back but is stabbed in the abdomen. He helps Kaveri escape by boat, but the goons surround and brutally dismember him.

Kaveri survives and gives birth to twins with the help of Muniyamma, a poor woman who shelters her. A bomb planted by one of the goons destroys Muniyamma's house, separating the women, each believing the other dead as they flee with one twin. Raja grows up as a mechanic with Muniyamma, while Appu, a short-statured dwarf, grows up as a circus artiste with Kaveri.

Appu falls in love with Mano, the circus owner's daughter, but mistakenly believes she wants to elope with him; she had actually asked him to witness her marriage to her disapproved fiancé Vincent. Heartbroken and insecure about his height, Appu attempts suicide, but Kaveri saves him and reveals that his dwarfism may have resulted from the poison she was forced to drink during pregnancy. After learning of Sethupathi's murder, Appu vows revenge.

Meanwhile, Raja falls in love with Janaki, Satyamoorthy's daughter. As Raja resembles Sethupathi, Satyamoorthy and his accomplices become suspicious of him. Appu kills Francis using a Rube Goldberg machine and later kills Nallasivam on a golf course using a circus tiger. Evidence at both scenes leads the investigating inspector to suspect Raja. Janaki, believing Raja responsible for her father's friends' deaths, breaks up with him, although he is released after the postmortem confirms that Nallasivam died from genuine tiger wounds.

Raja visits Janaki to reconcile, unaware that the inspector is following him. Appu then tricks Satyamoorthy into killing himself with a circus handgun that fires backwards. Raja and Janaki enter the room after hearing the shot, and the inspector concludes that Raja shot Satyamoorthy. Raja flees and becomes a fugitive.

After Raja is spotted in a marketplace, he takes a woman hostage, not realising she is Kaveri, his mother. When the crowd backs down, he releases Kaveri and flees. Kaveri recognises him as her lost son and reunites with Muniyamma. Together, they realise that Appu committed the murders and that Raja has been mistaken for him. Appu overhears them.

Dharmaraj, believing Raja is seeking revenge, kidnaps Kaveri and Muniyamma to force Raja to surrender. Appu helps Raja evade the police and reveals the truth. The twins join forces and rescue the women at the circus. During the ensuing fight, Dharmaraj's henchmen are defeated and Dharmaraj is left hanging from a rope. With Kaveri's silent approval, Appu shoots the rope, causing Dharmaraj to fall and be mauled by circus lions. Appu surrenders to the police, while Raja and Janaki reunite.

== Cast ==
- Kamal Haasan in a triple role as:
  - Appu
  - Raja
  - Sethupathi
- Gautami as Janaki
- Rupini as Mano
- Nagesh as Dharmaraj
- Jaishankar as Sathyamoorthy
- Manorama as Muniyamma
- Srividya as Kaveri
- Nassar as Nallasivam
- Delhi Ganesh as Francis Anbarasu
- Janagaraj as the inspector
- Mayilsamy as Raja's friend
- Moulee as Mano's father
- R. S. Shivaji as Constable Sambandham
- Crazy Mohan as the car owner
- Anand as Vincent

== Production ==
=== Development ===
In the mid-1980s, Kamal Haasan developed the desire to act as a dwarf in a feature film, and told Singeetam Srinivasa Rao about it. According to Haasan, the story was originally written for his mentor K. Balachander, who rejected the idea as "too complicated". Since no producers were willing to do the film, Haasan decided to produce it himself. Haasan and Rao developed the "tragic story" of a dwarf who works in a circus, falls in love with a woman who does not reciprocate his feelings, and realises only at the end of the film that she has left him for another man. The film would end with him walking into the desert with his circus troupe. Though shooting took place for a week, Rao became sceptical of the film's feasibility, and the project was dropped.

Afterwards, Haasan and Rao consulted Panchu Arunachalam who said, "you have a unique character – the dwarf; make him the hero and your picture is a hit." Arunachalam made substantial changes to the script, mainly to suit the interests of Kodambakkam audiences. It was his idea for Haasan to play an additional character, Raja, who would be the dwarf Appu's twin brother. According to Rao, the character of Raja was meant to satisfy "the popular audience" while Appu "makes the actual story". To prevent either character from overshadowing the other, Rao brought in additional plot details like "the whole mistaken identity, tiger dance and romance". Haasan initially approached Moulee to write the dialogue, but he declined; the position went to Crazy Mohan. Cinematography was handled by P. C. Sriram and editing by B. Lenin and V. T. Vijayan.

=== Casting ===
Haasan played three roles: Appu, Raja and Sethupathi. For Raja, he wore tight pants and unbuttoned denim shirts with sport shoes, whereas for Appu he wore only clown-like costumes besides regular clothes. Prem Nazir was the initial choice for the character of Sethupathi; because he was unwell at the time, Haasan himself played the role. Nagesh, known primarily as a comedian, was initially apprehensive when Haasan approached him to portray Dharmaraja; he feared the film would fail if audiences did not accept him in a negative role. Rao, Nagesh and Haasan wanted to depict the character as a new kind of villain.

Gandhimathi was originally cast as Appu's foster mother, but following changes in the script, she was replaced by Manorama. Lakshmi was offered to play Sethupathi's wife Kaveri but did not accept, resulting in Srividya being cast. Moulee, despite declining to write the film's dialogues, remained in the cast. Ravikanth appeared in a minor role as Raja's friend, but his portions were deleted from the final cut. Haasan had included a character for Krishnamachari Srikkanth, but the character was later removed. Stage actor Suppuni was offered the role of a handicapped character, but declined.

=== Filming and post-production ===
The portrayal of a dwarf by the normal-sized Haasan required different techniques for different camera angles. A pair of special shoes was prepared to be attached to the folded knees of the actor for the straight angle shots. Haasan adopted a particular way of holding up his arms to match the appearance of his shortened legs. For the side angle shots, a trench was dug up just to cover up the actor's legs from the feet to knees, with special shoes attached at the knee level. A scientist from Bangalore was employed to assist with the special effects for the dwarf. Rao noted Appu would lend "attention and sympathy from the audience" and he made sure Raja "got equal attention and sympathy".

S. T. Venki made his debut as visual effects designer for this film and also became the first person to use digital technology in visual effects. Animals used in the films were trained by Ravindra Sherpad Deval. The circus portions in the film were filmed at Gemini Circus and in Cochin. The song "Raja Kaiya Vachchaa" had many scenes inspired from Grease (1978), including the transformation of the old car into a new one, and the dramatically changing costumes of the dancers. The song "Ammava Naan" was initially dumped after the script went through changes, but after many days of running successfully in theatres, it was re-included as an added attraction. (Note: Inconsistently stated by sources to be after 50 days, 75 days, or 100 days.) While filming the climax, Nagesh insisted on performing his own stunts rather than using a double.

== Themes and influences ==
The title Apoorva Sagodharargal was taken from the 1949 Tamil film of the same name, an adaptation of the novella The Corsican Brothers by Alexandre Dumas. The idea of brothers coming together to avenge the death of their father is the common thread in both films. V. Ramji of Hindu Tamil Thisai felt the names of the villains – Nagesh's Dharmaraj, Jaishankar's Satyamoorthy, Nassar's Nallasivam and Delhi Ganesh's Francis Anbarasu – were in contrast to their personalities. Haasan compared the film to Yaadon Ki Baaraat (1973) because it features the concept of "a family being destroyed by the villain, brothers being separated and reunited". Balaji of Indolink compared it to Twins (1988) as both films feature "a pair of 'imperfect' twins".

== Soundtrack ==
The music was composed by Ilaiyaraaja. All the songs were written by Vaali, while Prem Dhawan and Rajasri wrote the lyrics for the Hindi and Telugu versions. The soundtrack to the film featured six songs, including two versions of "Raja Kaiya Vachchaa" sung by Haasan and S. P. Balasubrahmanyam, while the first version being used in the film and in the audio cassette, the latter was only included in the audio LP. The Hindi and Telugu versions' soundtrack consisted only five tracks.

== Release ==
Apoorva Sagodharargal was released on 14 April 1989 (Puthandu). Despite facing competition from other Puthandu releases such as Pudhea Paadhai and En Rathathin Rathame, it became the highest grossing Tamil film at the time, beating the record of Sakalakala Vallavan (1982). It was the first Tamil film to run for 100 days in five theatres in Bangalore, and overall completed a theatrical run of 200 days. The film was dubbed into Telugu as Vichithra Sodarulu, and into Hindi as Appu Raja and released in 1990.

=== Critical reception ===
Ananda Vikatan's review said that while there were three Haasans, the actor was stunning in his performance as Appu. P. S. S. of Kalki called the story formulaic, but praised the execution. Khalid Mohamed of The Times of India wrote, "Though [Kamal Haasan] dominates the show from the first frame to the last, the ensemble spirit is forever palpable: the ring-rang rock pop music score by Ilaiyaraja and the dynamic camerawork by P.C. Sriram of Nayakan contribute immensely to the picture's lightning impact."

=== Accolades ===
Event	Category	Recipient	Ref.
Tamil Nadu State Film Awards	Best Actor	Kamal Haasan	
Tamil Nadu State Film Awards	Best Lyricist	Vaali	
Filmfare Awards South	Best Film – Tamil	Kamal Haasan	
10th Cinema Express Awards	Best Film – Tamil	Kamal Haasan	
10th Cinema Express Awards	Best Actor – Tamil	Kamal Haasan	
10th Cinema Express Awards	Best Director – Special Prize	Singeetam Srinivasa Rao	
10th Cinema Express Awards	Best Lyricist	Vaali	

== Cancelled sequel ==
Haasan had considered making a sequel to Apoorva Sagodharargal, which would revolve around Appu escaping from prison. He even had one scene ready, and described it in 2021 as being "high up in the mountains with a high tension cable walk and Appu would be the only man to walk across the high tension cable but unfortunately, he chooses a windy day and that's how he loses his pole". The film was later dropped because, according to Haasan, "we wanted to stop being technobrats and become entertainers".

== Legacy ==
After the success of Apoorva Sagodharargal, Haasan and Mohan worked together on numerous films, including Michael Madana Kama Rajan (1990), Magalir Mattum (1994), Sathi Leelavathi (1995), Avvai Shanmugi (1996), Kaathala Kaathala (1998), Thenali (2000), Panchatanthiram (2002), Pammal K. Sambandam (2003) and Vasool Raja MBBS (2004). The Times of India wrote that Haasan "created history by playing a dwarf who was almost half his original height". In 2010, Rediff wrote: "Under Singeetham's very able direction, the movie blended mainstream cinema and emotion very well, [...] and marked the beginning of what was to be a long career, for Kamal Haasan, in getting more into the skin of his character, and setting higher standards for himself with the aid of superior make-up and body language." On Haasan's birthday, 7 November 2015, Latha Srinivasan of Daily News and Analysis considered Apoorva Sagodharargal to be one of the "films you must watch to grasp the breadth of Kamal Haasan's repertoire".

The film was included by Rediff in their list of Kamal Haasan's ten best films. Malathi Rangarajan of The Hindu noted that Haasan's commitment to playing a dwarf in Apoorva Sagotharargal "helped him scale heights, not many can reach". Baradwaj Rangan compared I (2015) to Apoorva Sagotharargal, saying that in both films, "a noxious substance results in the hero's ‘deformity’, and when he discovers how he came to be this way, he doles out punishment in inventive ways". Director Vinayan said that his Malayalam film Athbhutha Dweepu (2005) was inspired by Apoorva Sagodharargal. Rangan compared Mersal (2017) to Apoorva Sagodharargal, saying that in both films, "A father is brutally murdered. A son takes revenge. The other son is thought to be the killer."

== In popular culture ==
The 1990 film Raja Kaiya Vacha was named after the song from Apoorva Sagodharargal. The same song in the Telugu dubbed version inspired the 2016 film Raja Cheyyi Vesthe. The theme music from the film was humorously remixed as the "Gopi Bat Theme" in Chennai 600028 II (2016). In Periya Marudhu (1994), Sodalai (Goundamani) imagines himself as a dwarf similar to Appu and dances to the song "Pudhu Mappillaiku". Janagaraj and R. S. Shivaji reprised their roles in M. Kumaran Son of Mahalakshmi (2004). The scene where Appu uses a Rube Goldberg contraption to kill Francis Anbarasu was parodied in Tamizh Padam (2010), with Delhi Ganesh reprising his role.

== See also ==
- Cultural depictions of dwarfism

== Bibliography ==
- Dhananjayan, G. (2011). The Best of Tamil Cinema, 1931 to 2010: 1977–2010. Galatta Media. OCLC 733724281.
- Raj, Maya (July 2010). "Style Evolution: Kamal Haasan's Stupendous Style Journey". South Scope. Vol. 1, no. 10.
- Rajadhyaksha, Ashish; Willemen, Paul (1998) [1994]. Encyclopaedia of Indian Cinema. British Film Institute and Oxford University Press. ISBN 0-19-563579-5.
