= Raaj Kamal Films International =

Indian film studio

- Type: Film production Film distribution
- Industry: Entertainment
- Founded: 1981
- Founder: Haasan Brothers
- Headquarters: Chennai, India
- Key people: Kamal Haasan; Chandrahasan
- Products: Motion pictures

Raaj Kamal Films International is an Indian film production and distribution company founded and headed by Kamal Haasan. Raja Paarvai (1981) was the first film to be produced by them under the banner "Haasan Brothers" before renaming it to Raaj Kamal Films International.

== Filmography ==
=== Films produced ===
Year	Title	Language	Director	Cast	Notes	Ref.
1981	Raja Paarvai	Tamil	Singeetam Srinivasa Rao	Kamal Haasan, Madhavi, Y. G. Mahendra, L. V. Prasad		
1981	Amavasya Chandrudu	Telugu	Singeetam Srinivasa Rao	Kamal Haasan, Madhavi, Y. G. Mahendra, L. V. Prasad		
1986	Vikram	Tamil	Rajasekhar	Kamal Haasan, Sathyaraj, Amjad Khan, Dimple Kapadia, Ambika, Lissy		
1987	Kadamai Kanniyam Kattupaadu	Tamil	Santhana Bharathi	Sathyaraj, Geetha, Jeevitha, Nassar, Captain Raju		
1988	Sathyaa	Tamil	Suresh Krissna	Kamal Haasan, Amala, Rajesh, Nassar		
1989	Apoorva Sagodharargal	Tamil	Singeetam Srinivasa Rao	Kamal Haasan, Gautami, Rupini, Srividya		
1992	Thevar Magan	Tamil	Bharathan	Kamal Haasan, Sivaji Ganesan, Revathi, Gautami, Nassar		
1994	Magalir Mattum	Tamil	Singeetam Srinivasa Rao	Revathi, Urvashi, Rohini, Nassar		
1995	Sathi Leelavathi	Tamil	Balu Mahendra	Kamal Haasan, Ramesh Arvind, Heera, Kalpana, Kovai Sarala		
1995	Kuruthipunal	Tamil	P. C. Sreeram	Kamal Haasan, Arjun, Nassar, Gautami, Geetha		
1995	Drohi	Telugu	P. C. Sreeram	Kamal Haasan, Arjun, Nassar, Gautami, Geetha		
1997	Chachi 420	Hindi	Kamal Haasan	Kamal Haasan, Tabu, Amrish Puri, Om Puri	Remake of Avvai Shanmugi	
2000	Hey Ram	Tamil, Hindi	Kamal Haasan	Kamal Haasan, Shah Rukh Khan, Rani Mukerji, Hema Malini, Atul Kulkarni		
2003	Nala Damayanthi	Tamil	Mouli	Madhavan, Geetu Mohandas, Shruthika		
2004	Virumaandi	Tamil	Kamal Haasan	Kamal Haasan, Abhirami, Napoleon, Pasupathy		
2005	Mumbai Xpress	Tamil, Hindi	Singeetam Srinivasa Rao	Kamal Haasan, Manisha Koirala, Nassar		
2009	Unnaipol Oruvan	Tamil	Chakri Toleti	Kamal Haasan, Mohanlal, Ganesh Venkatraman, Bharath Reddy		
2009	Eenadu	Telugu	Chakri Toleti	Kamal Haasan, Venkatesh, Ganesh Venkatraman, Bharath Reddy		
2013	Vishwaroopam	Tamil	Kamal Haasan	Kamal Haasan, Rahul Bose, Pooja Kumar, Andrea Jeremiah		
2013	Vishwaroopam	Hindi	Kamal Haasan	Kamal Haasan, Rahul Bose, Pooja Kumar, Andrea Jeremiah		
2015	Uttama Villain	Tamil	Ramesh Aravind	Kamal Haasan, K. Balachander, K. Viswanath, Andrea Jeremiah, Pooja Kumar		
2015	Thoongaa Vanam	Tamil	Rajesh Selva	Kamal Haasan, Prakash Raj, Trisha, Kishore		
2015	Cheekati Rajyam	Telugu	Rajesh Selva	Kamal Haasan, Prakash Raj, Trisha, Kishore		
2018	Vishwaroopam II	Tamil	Kamal Haasan	Kamal Haasan, Rahul Bose, Pooja Kumar, Andrea Jeremiah		
2018	Vishwaroopam II	Hindi	Kamal Haasan	Kamal Haasan, Rahul Bose, Pooja Kumar, Andrea Jeremiah		
2019	Kadaram Kondan	Tamil	Rajesh Selva	Vikram, Akshara Haasan, Abi Hassan		
2022	Vikram	Tamil	Lokesh Kanagaraj	Kamal Haasan, Vijay Sethupathi, Fahadh Faasil		
2024	Amaran	Tamil	Rajkumar Periasamy	Sivakarthikeyan, Sai Pallavi		
2025	Thug Life	Tamil	Mani Ratnam	Kamal Haasan, Silambarasan, Trisha, Aishwarya Lekshmi, Abhirami	Co-produced with Madras Talkies	
2027	Seyon †	Tamil	Sivakumar Murugesan	Sivakarthikeyan, Bhagyashri Borse	Filming	
2027	Dharman †	Tamil	Ashwath Marimuthu	Rajinikanth, Simran, Raashii Khanna	Filming	
2027	Sandiyar †	Tamil	S. U. Arun Kumar	Kamal Haasan	Filming	

=== Films distributed ===
In addition to the films produced by Raaj Kamal films since 1981, the following films from other banners were distributed by the company:

Year	Film	Language	Notes
1986	Hare Radha Hare Krishna	Tamil	Released Tamil dubbed version
1991	Gunaa	Tamil	
1995	Paasavalai	Tamil	Released Tamil dubbed version
1996	Avvai Shanmughi	Tamil	
1998	Kaathala Kaathala	Tamil	
2002	Pammal K. Sambandam	Tamil	
2002	Panchatanthiram	Tamil	
2005	Rama Shama Bhama	Kannada	Remake of Sathi Leelavathi
2021	83	Tamil	Released Tamil dubbed version

=== Cancelled projects ===
- Ladies Only (1997)
- Marudhanayagam (1999)
- Sabaash Naidu (2019)

== Awards ==
S.no	Ceremony	Year	Category	Nominee	Result
1	National Film Awards	1992	National Film Award for Best Feature Film in Tamil	Thevar Magan	Won
2	Tamil Nadu State Film Awards	1992	Tamil Nadu State Film Award for Best Film	Thevar Magan	Won
3	Filmfare Awards South	1989	Filmfare Award for Best Film – Tamil	Apoorva Sagodharargal	Won
4	Cinema Express Awards	1989	Cinema Express Award for Best Film – Tamil	Apoorva Sagodharargal	Won
5	Cinema Express Awards	1992	Cinema Express Award for Best Film – Tamil	Thevar Magan	Won
6	Cinema Express Awards	1995	Cinema Express Award for Best Film – Tamil	Kuruthipunal	Won
7	Puchon International Fantastic Film Festival (South Korea)	2004	International Award for Best Asian Film	Virumaandi	Won
8	Los Angeles Independent Film Festival	2015	Best Film	Uttama Villain	Won
9	SIIMA Awards	2024	Best Film	Amaran	Won
