= Ramesh Vinayakam =

Indian composer

- Also known as: Ramesh Vinayagam
- Born: Ramesh Vinayakam; 7 July 1963 (age 63)
- Genres: Filmi, World music, Carnatic music
- Occupations: Composer, record producer, instrumentalist, arranger, singer, lyricist
- Years active: 1986–present
- Website: https://www.rameshvin.com/

Ramesh Vinayakam (born 7 July 1963) is an Indian composer, arranger, singer, songwriter, music producer, and a music researcher.

== Early life ==
Ramesh Vinayakam was born Ramasubramaniam (aka Ramsubbu). He went to A. M. Jain College and later graduated in commerce from the University of Madras. He learned Carnatic music from Rukmini Ramani and Western classical music from Jacob John, completed his studies at the Trinity College, London with a diploma. Ramesh is very popular for his musical, oratorical talents and has won many competitions in the school and college. He held Secretary-Fine Arts in his alma mater – A M Jain College, Meenambakkam, Chennai (erstwhile Madras). Though initially he was a singer in his younger days, he has taken to composing like fish to water as both his parents are singers/composers, it is in his genes. By the time he completed his college he had already composed many songs for various situations along with his poet-friend Narayanan. He had a brief stint as a manager in his father's friend's firm, and he understood that his real ambition is to become a music composer instead of working in an office, as he used to compose/write pieces of music. He decided to pursue his dream when he got a chance to meet S. P. Balasubrahmanyam, through a friend who introduced him to the legend.

== Career ==
=== Composing ===
In 1986, Ramesh Vinayakam's first album Prathidhvani was released. The album was a compilation of devotional songs on 10 deities, all sung by S. P. Balasubrahmanyam. Three years later, director Moulee offered him a Telugu film, Paila Pacheesu and made him a music director. He worked with Moulee on two more films, Manchi Roju (1991) and Aunty (1995) starring Shobana and Jayasudha, respectively. Subsequently, he would again look for work and approach various producers and directors. Vinayakam recalls that "nothing happened" thereafter and calling it a "long and frustrating period". In 2002, director Vasanth eventually signed him as one of the five composers for his next romantic musical Hey! Nee Romba Azhaga Irukke. Ramesh Vinayakam's contribution to the ensemble soundtrack was the song "Thottu Thottu" that was also sung by him. The same year he composed for the film University that was his first full-fledged project in Tamil. The Hindu in its review wrote that the soundtrack album was "very strong on melody" and "definitely worth a listen". Although the film was a box office bomb, Vinayakam has said he was glad that University had happened, since it fetched him his next project Nala Damayanthi (2003), his most notable film till date. Written and produced by Kamal Haasan, it featured Madhavan in the lead. For the film, he further made Haasan sing an English song in the country genre. Vinayakam then composed the score and songs for Radha Mohan's maiden feature film Azhagiya Theeye and Jerry written by Crazy Mohan. He received positive critical response for his work in Azhagiya Theeye in particular.

Aside from film, Vinayakam has primarily worked on devotional music. He composed his first devotional song at age 12. Since, he has worked on a number of devotional albums, including Shambo Mahadeva, Krishna Janardhana and Sri Rama Dootam apart from Prathidhvani. In 2011, he composed the theme song for "Nadha Vaibhavam", a grand musical event of Sri Sri Ravishankar's Art of Living. Vinayakam has also composed many jingles and numerous title songs for television, including all of Crazy Mohan's television series.

His upcoming projects include the English remake of A Wednesday, titled A Common Man directed by Sri Lankan filmmaker Chandran Rutnam and starring Ben Kingsley, as well as S. P. Charan's next production.

=== Playback singing ===
Ramesh Vinayakam is a notable singer, too. While he has sung songs in all his Tamil films, he has also sung playback for other composers. Under Harris Jayaraj's direction, he had performed the song "Yaaridamum" from the film Thotti Jaya (2005). He has lent his voice for songs from the films Bhaiyaa, the dubbed Telugu version of the film Malaikottai, and the low budget flick Kadhal Valarthen, which had music by singer Srinivas. In 2010, he sang the number "Sada Siva" from the Telugu film Khaleja for composer Mani Sharma. Although the film did not fare well, the song became popular and Vinayakam along with N. C. Karunya, who co-sang the song, went on to win several accolades, including the Filmfare Award for Best Male Playback Singer – Telugu. In 2012, he sang the song "Stop The Pattu" from Moondru Per Moondru Kaadhal for composer Yuvan Shankar Raja.

=== Gamaka box ===
Ramesh Vinayakam has been working for several years on a so-called "Gamaka box" or Gamaka Box Notation System (GBNS), a way to visually represent and notate the gamaka, which is a type of ornamentation in Indian classical music. Notation of gamakams is generally not found in the Indian music system and Vinayakam's attempt was seen as a possible breakthrough and revolution in carnatic music. He has obtained patent for the Gamaka box notation.

=== New ragas ===
Over the course of his career, he has composed ten distinct ragas, each with its unique melodic structure and emotional expression. Among these ragas are Prathidwani, Madya Mohanam, and Dwi Niroshtra. He is working on creating a raga incorporates microtonal swarasthana, named "Sruti Ranjani". He created a raaga named by him as Beethovanapriya. The raga is based on Für Elise by Beethoven.

== Discography ==
=== As composer ===
Films

Year	Film	Language	Notes
1989	Paila Pacheesu	Telugu	
1991	Manchi Roju	Telugu	
1995	Aunty	Telugu	
1999	Speed Dancer	Telugu	
2002	Yai Nee Romba Azhaga Irukke	Tamil	composed 1 song "Thottu Thottu"
2002	University	Tamil	
2003	Nala Damayanthi	Tamil	
2004	Azhagiya Theeye	Tamil	
2006	Jerry	Tamil	
2012	Sollakathai	Tamil	Soundtrack release, film unreleased
2013	A Common Man	English	
2014	Ramanujan	English/Tamil	Tamil Nadu State Film Award for Best Music Director
2014	Mosakutty	Tamil	

Television

- Simran Thirai (Jaya TV)
- Crazy-in Vidathu Sirippu (Jaya TV)
- Rojakoottam (Vijay TV)

=== As playback singer ===
Year	Films	Song	Composer	Notes
2002	Hey! Nee Romba Azhaga Irukke	Thottu Thottu Sellum	Himself	
2003	Nala Damayanthi	Enna Idhu	Himself	
2004	Azhagiya Theeye	Vizhigalin Aruginil, Sandhana Poongatre	Himself	
2005	Thotti Jaya	Yaaradimum Thondravillai	Harris Jayaraj	
2006	Jerry	Naan Pudicha Muyalukku	Himself	
2010	Khaleja (Telugu)	Sadasiva	Mani Sharma	also sang the Tamil version; Filmfare Award for Best Male Playback Singer – Telugu
2012	Moondru Per Moondru Kadhal	Stop The Paattu	Yuvan Shankar Raja	
2012	Saattai	Jada Jada Jaada	D. Imman	
2013	Endrendrum Punnagai	Ennatha Solla	Harris Jayaraj	Co-singers: Karthik, Haricharan, Velmurugan
2014	Ramanujan	Thuli Thuliyay	Himself	
2014	Dikkulu Choodaku Ramayya (Telugu)	Andari Rathalu	M. M. Keeravani	

=== Devotional albums ===
- Prathidhvani (1986)
- Sambo Mahadeva (1990)
- Krishna Janardhana (1993)
- Aha Oho Ayyappa (1996)
- Vetrivel Sivasakthivel (2002)
- Moksha Mantra of Lord Shiva (2005)
- Sri Rama Dootam (2009)
