= Kavithalayaa Krishnan =

Indian actor

- Born: T. Krishnan
- Occupation: Actor
- Years active: 1983–present

T. Krishnan, popularly known as Kavithalayaa Krishnan, is an Indian actor known for playing supporting roles in Tamil film and television. He is a regular artist in many K. Balachander's films and television serials produced by Kavithalayaa Productions and Kavithalayaa got along as his name.

== Career ==
Kavithalayaa Krishnan has acted in over 120 films, 60 television serials and made over 2500 stage appearances. He was awarded Kalaimamani (2005) by Government of Tamil Nadu. He started acting in stage plays along with Crazy Mohan who was his classmate when he did his engineering at College of Engineering, Guindy. He made his film debut in Poikkal Kudhirai (1983), a remake of Crazy Mohan's play Marriage made in Saloon directed by K. Balachander.

== Partial filmography ==
- Poikkal Kudhirai (1983)
- Sindhu Bhairavi (1985)
- Manathil Uruthi Vendum (1987)
- Dharmathin Thalaivan (1988)
- Sathyaa (1988)
- Apoorva Sagodharargal (1989)
- Indrudu Chandrudu (1989; Telugu)
- Unnai Solli Kutramillai (1990)
- Keladi Kannmanii (1990)
- Oru Veedu Iru Vasal (1990)
- Anjali (1990)
- Azhagan (1991)
- Idhayam (1991)
- Vaaname Ellai (1992)
- Annaamalai (1992)
- Vedan (1993)
- Jaathi Malli (1993)
- Chinna Mapillai (1993)
- Duet (1994)
- Pattukottai Periyappa (1994)
- Sathi Leelavathi (1995)
- Paattu Padava (1995)
- Engirundho Vandhan (1995)
- Baashha (1995)
- Avvai Shanmughi (1996)
- Nerrukku Ner (1997)
- Ratchagan (1997)
- Santhosham (1998)
- Thulli Thirintha Kaalam (1998)
- Natpukkaga (1998)
- Harichandra (1998)
- Suyamvaram (1999)
- Paarthale Paravasam (2001)
- Majunu (2001)
- Pammal K. Sambandam (2002)
- Yai! Nee Romba Azhaga Irukke! (2002)
- Shree (2002)
- Vasool Raja MBBS (2004)
- Ayya (2005)
- Idhaya Thirudan (2006)
- Thozha (2008)
- Kuselan (2008)
- Dasavathaaram (2008)
- Ilaignan (2011)
- Eththan (2011)
- Aarohanam (2012)
- Thegidi (2014)
- Strawberry (2015)
- Vai Raja Vai (2015)
- Sawaari (2016)
- Kannula Kaasa Kattappa (2016)
- Kanavu Variyam (2017)
- Irumbu Thirai (2018)
- Abhiyum Anuvum (2018)
- '96 (2018)
- Koothan (2018)
- Mei (2019)
- House Owner (2019)
- Adutha Saattai (2019)
- Payanigal Gavanikkavum (2022)
- Veetla Vishesham (2022)
- Gargi (2022)
- Vendhu Thanindhathu Kaadu (2022)
- Super Senior Heroes (2022)
- Are You Ok Baby? (2023)
- Shot Boot Three (2023)
- Hitler (2024)

== Television ==
Serial	Role	Channel
Rayil Sneham	Kathiravan	Doordarshan
Penn	Office manager	Doordarshan
Kaialavu Manasu	Manavalan	Sun TV
Kadhal Pagadai	Ayappa	Sun TV
Marmadesam	"Vaidyan" Ramarathinam	Sun TV
Jannal-Adutha Veetu Kavithaigal		Sun TV
Inai Kodugal		Sun TV
Aridharam Poosiya Uravugal		Sun TV
Akshaya		Sun TV
Kadavulukku Kovam Vandhadhu	Jambu	Sun TV
Sorgam		Sun TV
Ramany vs Ramany	Police officer	Sun TV
Ramany vs Ramany Part II	tennis player/film director	Raj TV
Alaigal	Ramu / Rajashekar	Sun TV
Pondatti Thevai	Sundaravanthanam	Sun TV
Sahana		Jaya TV
Selvi	Sathyamoorthy	Sun TV
Sorgam	Thirugnanam	Sun TV
Aaha		Vijay TV
Anni	Subbaiya	Jaya TV
Amudha Oru Aacharyakuri		Kalaignar TV
Enga Veettu Penn		Zee Tamizh
Vani Rani	Krishnan	Sun TV
Roja	Purushotthaman	Sun TV
Suryavamsam		Zee Tamil
Modhalum Kaadhalum	Ravi	Star Vijay

=== Streaming television ===
Year	Program Name	Role	Network	Ref.
2020	Triples	Doctor	Hotstar	
2024–present	Heart Beat	Ganesh	Hotstar	
