= Chachi 420 =

- Poster
- Directed by: Kamal Haasan
- Screenplay by: Kamal Haasan
- Dialogues by: Gulzar
- Story by: Crazy Mohan
- Based on: Avvai Shanmugi by Crazy Mohan
- Produced by: Chandra Haasan; Kamal Haasan; Jhamu Sughand
- Starring: Kamal Haasan; Tabu; Amrish Puri; Om Puri; Paresh Rawal; Fatima Sana Shaikh
- Cinematography: Jehangir Choudhary
- Edited by: V. N. Mayekar
- Music by: Songs: Vishal Bhardwaj; Background Score: Deva
- Production company: Raaj Kamal Films International
- Release date: 19 December 1997
- Country: India
- Language: Hindi
- Box office: ₹11.42 crore (domestic)

Chachi 420 (transl. The trickster aunt) is a 1997 Indian Hindi-language comedy film, co-written, produced and directed by Kamal Haasan. The film is an official remake of the 1996 Tamil film Avvai Shanmugi, which itself was an adaptation of the 1993 film Mrs. Doubtfire starring Robin Williams (an adaptation of the 1987 novel Madame Doubtfire). The film stars Haasan and Nassar (reprising their roles from the original) along with Tabu, Amrish Puri, Om Puri, Johnny Walker, Paresh Rawal, Rajendranath Zutshi, Ayesha Jhulka and Fatima Sana Shaikh.

== Plot ==
Jaiprakash and Janki Paswan are fighting a divorce case. Janaki is the only daughter of Durgaprasad Bhardwaj, a staunch Hindu Brahmin businessman. Jaiprakash, a Hindu Dusadh, is an assistant dance director in films. The duo fell in love and married against the will of Durgaprasad. However, Janki buckles under the pressure of middle-class life. Other differences crop up between the couple and Janki walks out. The court grants the divorce. Jai is allowed to meet his beloved daughter Bharti once a week. But when he sneaks into the Bhardwaj house to steal Bharti, he loses visitation rights.

Meanwhile, Durgaprasad puts ads in local newspapers for a nanny for Bharti. Jai sees this as an opportunity and calls Durgaprasad. Impersonating a female, he introduces himself as 'Shrimati Lakshmi Godbole' and applies for the position. With the help of a drunkard makeup artist Joseph, Jai undergoes a complete transformation into Lakshmi Godbole, a dignified elderly Marathi woman. He goes to the interview, where he is generally viewed as the last pick. But Bharti has an accident, and Lakshmi acts promptly to give first aid. Lakshmi gets the job and the respect of the Bhardwaj family.

Jai begins the job but creates plausible stories so that his real work schedule does not clash with the job in Bhardwaj's home. Apart from Joseph, only Bharti (who sees through her father's disguise) knows the real identity of Lakshmi. Jai learns that Durgaprasad's secretary Banwarilal Pandit is not exactly thrilled at Lakshmi's entry. The reasons are various, such as Banwa's womanizing nature (which naturally views an old woman like Lakshmi with dislike) and his desire to siphon off Durgaprasad's money via friendly maids.

Meanwhile, Durgaprasad decides to get Janki remarried to Dr Rohit, her childhood friend. One day, when Janki and Rohit get attacked by goons in the market, the doctor scampers. Lakshmi saves Janki's life and modesty. Later, Durgaprasad tells Lakshmi that he has changed his mind about the marriage on learning of Rohit's cowardice. Lakshmi also exposes the thefts committed by the maid in the Bhardwaj house. The maid is fired, and eventually Banwa has no other option but to let a male cook be appointed instead. Jai runs into his old friend Shiraz, a Muslim restaurant chef who is now doing menial jobs as he lost his job trying to help Jai. Lakshmi introduces Shiraz to the Bhardwaj household as Pandit Shivraj Sharma, a mute Brahmin cook. Even Shiraz does not know that Lakshmi and Jai are the same people.

Jai learns that although Janki likes Lakshmi, who by now has earned the affectionate title of Chachi (a respected aunt), she still loathes Jai. Meanwhile, Jai has other problems in his own home. His landlord Hari is after him for his rent. After he sees Lakshmi, Hari falls for her. As if that is not enough, a struggler named Ratna tries to cozy up to Jai. Meanwhile, Durgaprasad also falls for Lakshmi and goes to the extent of proposing to her.

Jai, as Lakshmi, buys time by telling Durgaprasad that 'she' is married but 'her' husband has left 'her' and got converted into a Christian named Joseph. Lakshmi also convinces Durgaprasad that 'she' is still waiting for 'her' husband. On the other hand, Jai tells Hari that Banwa is Lakshmi's husband Durgaprasad. He also tells Hari to harbour no feelings for Lakshmi. At the same time, Jai tells Banwa that Lakshmi's husband has converted and calls himself Haribhai.

Banwa intensifies his efforts to discredit Lakshmi in the eyes of Durgaprasad and Janki but in vain. Meanwhile, Janki and Durgaprasad realize that they have punished Jai too hard for all the things he has done. Banwa gets a small victory when he blows Shiraz's cover. But Lakshmi makes Durgaprasad see sense that religion and caste do not matter. Durgaprasad shows mercy on Shiraz, giving a verdict that the cook can stay and need not put up his act anymore. However, now Durgaprasad ends up hurting Janki's feelings.

Banwa and Janki see that there is something fishy about Lakshmi. Meanwhile, Shiraz tries to force Lakshmi to marry Durgaprasad. Shiraz threatens 'her' by covering himself in kerosene, which forces Jai to reveal himself. But, owing to a misunderstanding about this scene, Banwa is able to convince Janki that Lakshmi is a promiscuous woman who is seducing the cook as well as Durgaprasad. Janki, who is very hurt by the turn of events, leaves her father's home and goes to reconcile with Jai. But on seeing Ratna waiting for him, and Lakshmi's clothes strewn about his home, Janki gets the wrong idea that her husband is also promiscuous. Janki goes to commit suicide. Jai/Lakshmi follows on a motorcycle and jumps into the river to save her. There, Jai/Lakshmi reveals his/'her' true self. Janki hears the whole story and reconciles with him. They come up with a story that Lakshmi died trying to save Janki.

To tie up other loose ends, they convince Banwari that Lakshmi is dead. They threaten and blackmail Banwa with his secrets to ensure his silence. They tell Hari to let it go. Joseph almost accidentally betrays some part of the truth, but Jai hushes up the matter by saying that Lakshmi will always remain alive in the hearts of everybody who knew her. Jai and Janki remarry.

== Cast ==
The cast has been listed below:

- Kamal Haasan as Jai Prakash Paswan / Laxmi Godbole
- Tabu as Janki Paswan
- Amrish Puri as Durgaprasad Bharadwaj
- Fatima Sana Shaikh as Bharti Paswan
- Om Puri as Banwarilal Pandit
- Johnny Walker as Joseph
- Paresh Rawal as Hari Bhai
- Nassar as Shiraz Akhtar / Pandit Shivraj Sharma
- Ayesha Jhulka as Ratna
- Rajendranath Zutshi as Dr. Rohit
- Laxmi Rattan as a Doctor
- Atul Agnihotri as himself in a song (special appearance)
- Vasanthi in a song (special appearance)

== Production ==
In 1997, Kamal initially chose noted ad-film maker Shantanu Sheorey to direct the Hindi remake of Avvai Shanmughi, then titled Chikni Chachi. But unhappy with the complaints after five days of shoot and after checking the actual result, he took over as director. Actress Ashwini Bhave also left the film after the shoot began, and was replaced by Ayesha Jhulka. The film went through a change of title to Stree 420, before being finalised as Chachi 420.

== Soundtrack ==
Chachi 420

Soundtrack album by Vishal Bhardwaj
- Released: 1997
- Genre: Feature film soundtrack
- Language: Hindi
- Label: Bombino

The soundtrack of the film composed by Vishal Bhardwaj with lyrics by Gulzar, consisting of six tracks was released on 19 December 1997.

Track list
No.	Title	Singer(s)	Length
1.	"Chupdi Chachi"	Aditya Narayan, Shruti Haasan	4:26
2.	"Ek Woh Din"	Rekha Bhardwaj	6:19
3.	"Jaago Gori (Chachi's Voice)"	Asha Bhosle, Kamal Haasan, Shruti Haasan	6:12
4.	"Gare Dore"	Asha Bhosle, Hariharan	4:27
5.	"Bhaaga Sa"	Hariharan	3:46
6.	"Jaago Gori (male voice, soundtrack only)"	Asha Bhosle, Kamal Haasan, Shruti Haasan	5:22
Total length:			30:32

The reviewer for Screen called the music in the film "real different" and wrote, "The songs may not appeal in the first hearing, but a repeat hearing will surely have you addicted." They commended Aditya Narayan's work and wrote that he "bowls you over" and that the "tongue-twisting lyrics are faultlessly rendered". They further wrote, "Hariharan renders the fast-paced "Bhaaga Sa" competently. Gulzar's endearing lyrics, with unusual punning, bring a smile to your lips. Vishal is at his innovative best."

== Release ==
Chachi 420 was released on 19 December 1997. In 2015, the film was screened at the Habitat Film Festival.

=== Critical reception ===
Screen wrote "Kamal Haasan, the actor, is in terrific form, but it is Kamal Haasan, the director, who is the true star of Chachi 420". D. S. Ramanujam of The Hindu wrote "Based on Mrs. Doubtfire, this humorous entertainer by Raj Kamal Films International, has many tricky and embarrassing situations so nicely ingrained into the screenplay of actor- director".

=== Box office ===
Box Office India certified the film as a "HIT" as it netted ₹11.42 crore (US$1.2 million).
