= Neelu =

Indian actor

- Born: R. Neelakantan; 26 July 1936; Manjeri, Kerala
- Died: 10 May 2018 (aged 81); Chennai, Tamil Nadu
- Years active: 1960–2018
- Known for: Actor

R. Neelakantan (20 July 1936 – 10 May 2018), best known by his stage name Neelu, was an Indian actor known for his comedy and supporting role performances in Tamil cinema, television and theatre. He has acted in over 7,000 plays and 160 films. He died on 10 May 2018 in Chennai.

== Career ==
Neelu started acting in school plays from school days, continuing through his college days at Vivekananda College. He, along with Ambi (Cho Ramaswamy's brother) and Narayanasamy, started Viveka Fine Arts. He acted in plays like Muhammad bin Tughluq, Endru Thaniyum Indha Sudandira Dhaagam, Quo Vadis, Unmayae Un Vilai Enna?, Yarukkum Vetkamillai. In 1966 he made his film debut Aayiram Poi directed by Muktha Srinivasan. He has acted in plays along with Crazy Mohan, Cho Ramaswamy. He has also worked as a production manager in Jerry. All through his career, he worked with V D Swamy before retiring from his day job after 40 years of service.

== Filmography ==
This is partial filmography. You can expand it.

No	Film	Role	Notes
1969	Aayiram Poi	Neelakanda Sasthri	Debut
1971	Arunodhayam	Rowdy Ranga	
1971	Nootrukku Nooru		
1971	Muhammad bin Tughluq	Thathachari	
1971	Sabatham		
1972	Thaikku Oru Pillai		
1972	Mr. Sampath		
1972	Arangetram	a music teacher	
1973	Bharatha Vilas		
1973	Gouravam	Neelakandan	
1973	Then Sindhudhe Vaanam		
1974	Ore Satchi		
1974	Paatha Poojai		
1975	Cinema Paithiyam	Kadha Kaalatchebam singer	
1976	Satyam		
1976	Payanam		
1976	Unmaiye Un Vilai Enna?		
1976	Sila Nerangalil Sila Manithargal		
1976	Rojavin Raja	College professor	
1978	Velum Mayilum Thunai	Advocate Appalachari	40:12 Famous வெங்காய வடை / Divorce comedy scene
1978	Kannan Oru Kai Kuzhandhai		
1979	Devathai		
1981	Netrikkan	Doctor	
1981	Lorry Driver Rajakannu		
1982	Kadhalithu Paar		
1983	Thanga Magan		
1983	Nenjamellam Neeye		
1984	Niraparaadhi		
1986	Vivahithare Ithile		
1988	Katha Nayagan	Head clark	
1992	Kaviya Thalaivan		
1993	Amma Ponnu		
1993	Mutrugai		
1994	Pudhiya Mannargal		
1996	Avvai Shanmughi	Judge	
1996	Vetri Vinayagar	Gurukulam head	
1997	Suryavamsam	Doctor	
2000	Kandukondain Kandukondain		
2001	Dheena	Restaurant owner	
2002	Pammal K. Sambandam	Police inspector	
2002	Varushamellam Vasantham	District collector	
2002	Panchatanthiram	Ammini's father	
2002	Jjunction		
2003	Priyamaana Thozhi		
2005	Anniyan	Ananthanarayanan	
2006	Jery		
2006	Rendu		
2007	Veerappu		
2010	Kola Kolaya Mundhirika	Thirumalachari	
2013	Kalyana Samayal Saadham		
2014	Irumbu Kuthirai	Prithviraj's boss's father	
2015	Trisha Illana Nayanthara		
2017	Anbanavan Asaradhavan Adangadhavan	Neelu Thatha	Last film

== Television ==
- Engey Brahmanan
- Vidathu Sirippu (2003)
- Roja (2004)
- Siri Siri Crazy ( ' Madhu balaji Father ' )
- Chocolate Krishna
- Washingtonil Tirumanam (groom's father) (1995)
