= Vidathu Sirippu =

Soap opera

- Genre: Soap opera
- Written by: Crazy Mohan
- Directed by: S. B. Khanthan
- Starring: Maadhu Balaji; Cheenu Mohan; Crazy Mohan; Uma Ravi; Vinodhini; Kathadi Ramamurthy; Sowbarnika; Neelu
- Theme music composer: Ramesh Vinayakam
- Opening theme: "Crazy in Vidathu"
- Country of origin: India
- Original language: Tamil
- No. of seasons: 2
- No. of episodes: 25+

Production
- Producer: V. Vishwanathan
- Camera setup: Multi-camera
- Running time: approx. 20-22 minutes
- Production company: L. Ve. Creations.

Original release
- Network: Jaya TV; Jaya TV HD
- Release: 20 December 2003

Vidathu Sirippu (transl. The laughter won't let go), a name parody on Vidathu Karuppu (transl. Karuppu Never Spares), is a 2003 Tamil-language family soap opera, starring Maadhu Balaji, Cheenu Mohan, Crazy Mohan, Uma Ravi, Kathadi Ramamurthy, Sowbarnika, Neelu and Vinodhini that premiered on Jaya TV 20 December 2003. The series airs Saturday and Sunday at 9:00PM IST. It is directed by S.B. Khanthan. The series was re-telecasted in year 2020.

== Cast ==
- Maadhu Balaji as Maadhu
- Cheenu Mohan as Cheenu
- Crazy Mohan as Krishnamoorthy "Kiccha", Krishna and the Scientist
- Uma Ravi as Mythili
- Kathadi Ramamurthy
- Sowbarnika
- Vinodhini as Janaki
- Neelu as Ramanujam
- Chaams as Evil Scientist
