= Aunty Preethse =

2001 film by H Vasu

- VCD cover
- Directed by: H. Vasu
- Written by: T. S. B. K. Moulee
- Based on: Aunty (Telugu)
- Produced by: Munirathna
- Starring: Anant Nag; Khushbu; Ramkumar
- Cinematography: Mallikarjun
- Edited by: Shyam
- Music by: Chaithanya
- Release date: 16 May 2001
- Running time: 150 min.
- Country: India
- Language: Kannada

Aunty Preethse (transl. Aunty, love me) is a 2001 Indian Kannada-language romantic comedy film. It is a remake of the 1995 Telugu film Aunty and stars Anant Nag, Khushbu, Ramkumar and Anu Prabhakar. The film was a box office success and was dubbed into Tamil as Super Aunty with the comedy track of Tennis Krishna and Bank Janardhan filmed with Vadivelu and Vennira Aadai Moorthy.

== Cast ==
- Anant Nag
- Khushbu
- Ramkumar
- Anu Prabhakar
- Balaraj
- Anand
- Ashalatha
- Jyothi
- Rekha Das
- Pankaja
- Sundar Raj
- Doddanna
- Tennis Krishna
- Bank Janardhan
- Mandeep Roy
- Vadivelu as Krishnan (Tamil version)

== Soundtrack ==
Soundtrack was composed by L. N. Shastry.

- "Sneha Deepawali" - L. N. Shastry, K. S. Chithra
- "Preethi" - Rajesh Krishnan, Suma Shastry
- "Odu Thare" - K. S. Chithra
- "Dayana" - L. N. Sastry
- "Chittegodu" - Rajesh Krishnan

== Reception ==
A critic from Online Bangalore wrote that "This movie can be fairly termed to a well-made movie. There is a proper balance of everything in this movie". A critic from Chitraloka.com wrote that "This aunty is beauty, fatty, with morality, sanctity, variety and modernity. The uncles would definitely find it uncomfortable when they come and watch this aunty. This is not in a bad taste. Such is her velocity and activity".
