= Panchatanthiram =

2002 film by K. S. Ravikumar

- Promotional poster
- Directed by: K. S. Ravikumar
- Screenplay by: K. S. Ravikumar; Kamal Haasan
- Dialogues by: Crazy Mohan
- Story by: Kamal Haasan
- Produced by: P. L. Thenappan
- Starring: Kamal Haasan; Simran; Jayaram; Ramya Krishnan; Ramesh Aravind; Sriman; Yugi Sethu
- Cinematography: Arthur A. Wilson
- Edited by: Thanigachalam
- Music by: Deva
- Production company: Sri Rajlakshmi Film (P) Ltd
- Distributed by: Raaj Kamal Films International
- Release date: 28 June 2002
- Running time: 148 minutes
- Country: India
- Language: Tamil

Panchatanthiram (transl. Five Ruses) is a 2002 Indian Tamil-language black comedy film co-written and directed by K. S. Ravikumar. The story is written by Kamal Haasan with the dialogues by Crazy Mohan. The film stars Haasan, Jayaram, Ramesh Aravind, Sriman, Yugi Sethu, Simran and Ramya Krishnan, with Urvashi, Aishwarya, Sanghavi, Vidhya Venkatesh, Devayani and Nagesh in supporting roles. It loosely adapts from the 1998 film Very Bad Things with new elements added to it.

Panchatanthiram released on 28 June 2002 and became a commercial success. Jayaram won Filmfare Award for Best Supporting Actor – Tamil at the 50th South Filmfare Awards.

== Plot ==
Ramachandramurthy alias Ram. C. M, is an Indian pilot based in Canada and a womanizer. One day, in the course of an aircraft hijacking, he meets a passenger named Mythili. Ram and Mythili stop the hijacking and save the passengers. Soon after, they fall in love and get married. Ram's four closest friends, Ayyapan Nair, Vedhantham Iyer alias Vedham, Ganesh Hegde, and Hanumanth Reddy, attend their wedding reception.

After marriage, Ram quits his playboy character and remains faithful to Mythili. One day, when Ram prevents Hegde's ex-girlfriend, Nirmala, from committing suicide, Mythili misinterprets the situation as Ram having an affair with Nirmala. She then leaves him to be with her parents. Further misunderstanding occurs when he sets out to meet Mythili, drunk, in the middle of the night and enters the wrong room.

To take his mind off Mythili for a while, Ram's friends drive him down to Bengaluru and rent a room to hire a call girl named Maragathavalli, alias Maggie, on Ram's birthday. Ram, who is still not able to forget Mythili and does not wish to betray her, gets into a fight with Maggie. To salvage the situation, Vedham hurries back to Maggie's room, only to find Maggie dead. Panicking, Nair, Vedham, Hegde, and Reddy decide to discreetly dispose of the body in spite of Ram's pleas to call the police. They manage to roll the body in a blanket, dispose of it in a dry river and drive back to Chennai to return to their normal lives.

Ram discovers a cache of diamonds inside Maggie's mobile phone. He decides to find the real murderer with the diamonds. A few days later, the friends get very nervous when they learn of a news article regarding the discovery of a corpse in the same area where they disposed of Maggie's body. At that time, the wives of Ram's four friends plan to unite Ram and Mythili by holding a party at the traditional festival of Ugadi at Reddy's house. The wives invite Mythili to the party to be reunited with Ram.

At the party, Maggie appears, demanding her diamonds back. Maggie then reveals the truth behind her death. The diamonds belong to a smuggler, and she stole them from him for personal gain. She chose to merely fake her death as she realized that the diamonds would be temporarily safe in Ram's possession. She also blackmails Ram, saying that she will reveal the truth about their rendezvous in Bangalore to Mythili and their wives if he does not give the diamonds back. The smuggler then arrives and kidnaps Maggie, Ram, and his friends. Mythili spots Ram and Maggie together. She again believes that Ram has not changed his ways. Mythili, along with an undercover police inspector, follows them.

While the smuggler demands his diamonds back, Mythili appears with the undercover inspector. Upon seeing Ram and Maggie together, she believes that Ram is hugging Maggie, when in reality Ram, Maggie and his friends, are being held captive by the smuggler. She swallows some sleeping pills, which turns out to be where Ram hid the diamonds. Mythili decides to commit suicide and goes to a bridge. After finding out that Mythili swallowed the diamonds, Maggie and the smuggler try to save her and take the diamonds, but they get arrested by the undercover inspector and the police. Ram manages to save Mythili. After overhearing the conversation between Ram and his friends about what has happened, Mythili promises to reform her suspicious ways. The two then reunite.

== Cast ==
- Kamal Haasan as Ramachandramurthy (Ram C. M.)
- Jayaram as Ayyappan Nair
- Simran as Mythili Ramachandramurthy (voice-over by Savitha Reddy)
- Ramya Krishnan as Maragathavalli (Maggie)
- Ramesh Aravind as Ganesh Hegde
- Sriman as Hanumanth Reddy
- Yugi Sethu as Vedhantham Iyer (Vedham)
- Urvashi as Ammini Ayyappan Nair
- Aishwarya as Janaki Vedhantham Iyer
- Sanghavi as Chamundi Ganesh Hegde
- Vidhya Venkatesh as Reddy's wife
- Devayani as Nirmala
- Vijayakumar as Mythili's father
- Nagesh as Parthasarathy
- Dubbing Janaki as Parvatham
- Master Bharathkumar as Appukuttan Ayyappan Nair
- Kaikala Satyanarayana as Reddy
- Manivannan as the diamond-smuggling boss
- Alphonsa as the smuggling boss' Mistress
- K. S. Ravikumar as co-pilot Kumar
- Ramesh Khanna as Sardarji/Undercover Police Inspector
- Santhana Bharathi as Bharathi
- Kovai Sarala as Bharathi's wife
- Vasu Vikram as a traffic police officer
- Neelu as Ammini's father
- Scissor Manohar as the auto driver
- Vengal Rao as diamond smuggling gang member
- Muthukaalai as diamond smuggling gang member
- Tess as Ram's girlfriend (special appearance in the song "Manmatha Leelai")
- Simone as Ram's girlfriend (special appearance in the song "Manmatha Leelai")
- Mere as Ram's girlfriend (special appearance in the song "Manmatha Leelai")

== Production ==
The film marked the debut production of director K. S. Ravikumar's manager P. L. Thenappan. Retired cricketer Krishnamachari Srikkanth and theatre actor Maadhu Balaji were considered to portray the role of Vedhantham Iyengar, before Yugi Sethu was finalised. Sethu signed on revealing that Haasan had approached him to be a part of his two previous films, Thenali (2000) and Pammal K. Sambandam (2002) too, which he did not take up.

The film began production in February 2002. Jayaram, who plays one of the five friends, said the film's title was not a reference to the Panchatantra, but the five friends. It was shot in Canada for seventeen days. In April 2002, Haasan was prevented from boarding a Los Angeles-bound flight in Toronto during the making of the film, with the security preventing him from passing due to his Islamic-sounding surname. In June 2002, the five friends in the film along with Deva took part in a promotional tour to publicise the soundtrack in Bangalore. The film faced trouble during censorship and parts of a song featuring Ramya Krishnan were subsequently cut.

== Soundtrack ==
The soundtrack of the film was composed by Deva, with lyrics written by Vairamuthu. The song "Vai Raja Vai" incorporates lyrics from the Hindi song "Aana Meri Jaan" from Shehnai (1947), while the nu metal song "Manmatha Leelai" was influenced by Linkin Park's "Points of Authority".

All lyrics are written by Vairamuthu.

Track listing
No.	Title	Singer(s)	Length
1.	"Ennoda Kadhal"	Harini, Mano	4:48
2.	"Vandhaen Vandhaen"	Sujatha Mohan, Nithyasree Mahadevan, Kamal Haasan	5:40
3.	"Kadhal Piriyamal"	Kamal Haasan	5:58
4.	"Vai Raja Vai"	Srinivas, Shalini Singh	5:02
5.	"Manmatha Leelai"	Devan, Timothy, Mathangi	5:27
Total length:			26:55

== Release and reception ==
The film released on 28 June 2002. Malathi Rangarajan from The Hindu said that Crazy Mohan's dialogue was "the mainstay", describing the film as "completely entertaining". She also praised the film's performances claiming that "with suitable slapstick, apt body language and timing and modulation that tickle, the veteran (Kamal Haasan) makes a mark yet again." Furthermore, reviewers from Screen magazine dubbed the film as a "clean comic-entertainer", adding that Ravikumar "deserves a pat for weaving out a good screenplay based on Kamal Haasan's story idea and creating a laugh riot". Tulika of Rediff labelled the film as "a barrel of laughs". Visual Dasan of Kalki felt Jayaram's talent was underused, and gave the film an "average" verdict. Sify wrote "Kamalhassan’s love for Hollywood comedies is well known and he has specialised in Indianising them successfully. Now he has gone a step further and tried to make an American black comedy Very Bad Things as his latest Panchatanthiram. But somehow it fails to impress as the screenplay written by Crazy Mohan is not tight and most of the funny situations reminds you of his earlier comedies".

The film was a blockbuster and remains a cult classic in the comedy genre. The film was dubbed in Telugu as Panchatantram on 30 August 2002 with Vennelakanti providing the dialogues. Kamal Haasan distributed the film himself in the Karnataka region.

== Dropped sequel ==
A sequel was planned and Ravikumar had hoped to film scenes on a cruise liner, but the project failed to take off. Ravikumar instead set his 2010 film Manmadan Ambu, which also stars Haasan, on a cruise liner. Lokesh Kanagaraj also considered making a sequel, but dropped the idea and instead collaborated with Haasan on Vikram (2022).
