= Chocolate Krishna =

2008 Tamil-language comedy play

- Original language: Tamil
- Written by: Crazy Mohan
- Genre: Comedy

Premiere
- Date: 23 May 2008

Chocolate Krishna is a Tamil-language comedy play directed by S. B. Khanthan and written by Crazy Mohan. The play has been staged over 1000 times since its inauguration in 2008, and Mohan enacted the title role in 992 stagings until his death in June 2019, with K. K. Ravishankar taking over the role in January 2020. A spinoff play titled Google Gadothgajan, first staged in 2015, had Mohan reprising his role.

== Cast ==
- Crazy Mohan / K. K. Ravishankar as Chocolate Krishna
- Maadhu Balaji as Maadhu
- Neelu as Neelakandan Sastry

== Production ==
Crazy Mohan said he developed a desire to write a play with "God as the fulcrum" after watching the play Krishnaya Thubhyam Namaha, and the film Kaliyuga Kannan (1974) encouraged him to solidify his plans. This resulted in the play Chocolate Krishna. Mohan said the play was created with children in mind as they would be a fresh audience and incorporates elements that interest them such as magic, chocolate and Krishna. Theatre personality Shivaji Chaturvedi taught magic for the play. The play was first staged on 23 May 2008 at Karthik Fine Arts (now closed) in Chennai. The 150th and 400th shows were held at the Narada Gana Sabha on 22 February 2009 and 24 July 2011, respectively. The 500th show on 9 June 2012 in Houston. The 700th show was held on 24 August 2014 at the National University of Singapore auditorium. The 777th show was held on 11 July 2015 with Kamal Haasan attending as the chief guest. Mohan's brother Maadhu Balaji has consistently performed the role of Maadhu. Following Mohan's death in June 2019, K. K. Ravishankar took over the role of the title character, and the play was staged in late January 2020 with the subtitle Fresh Innings. The 1100th show of Chocolate Krishna was held on 15 October 2023 around the time of what would have been Mohan's 71st birthday. In all, Mohan had performed in the play 992 times.

== Release ==
The play was released online on 18 July 2020 on YouTube, Facebook and Kalakendra.com. It has also been released on DVD and Blu-ray.
