= Jery (film) =

- Poster
- Directed by: S. B. Khanthan
- Written by: Crazy Mohan
- Produced by: V. Vishwanathan
- Starring: Jithan Ramesh; Shruthi Raj; Mumtaj; Meera Vasudevan
- Cinematography: Arul Vincent
- Edited by: Krishnakumar
- Music by: Ramesh Vinayakam
- Production company: L. V. Creations
- Release date: 19 May 2006
- Running time: 150 minutes
- Country: India
- Language: Tamil

Jery (Tamil pronunciation: [dʑeɾːi]) is a 2006 Indian Tamil-language romantic comedy film directed by S. B. Khanthan and written by Crazy Mohan. The film stars Jithan Ramesh as the titular character, while Shruthi Raj, Mumtaj, and Meera Vasudevan play the female leads. The music was composed by Ramesh Vinayakam with editing done by Krishnakumar. The film was released on 19 May 2006.

== Plot ==
Jayaram alias Jery (Jithan Ramesh) is a man who takes risks and hates love. He is challenged by his friends to make three women love him. He makes his classmate Janaki (Shruthi Raj), an actress Janani (Mumtaj), and a police officer Jeeva (Meera Vasudevan) fall in love with him. Whether the three girls find out and whom he unites with forms the crux of the story.

== Cast ==
- Jithan Ramesh as Jayaram alias Jery
- Shruthi Raj as Janaki
- Mumtaj as Janani
- Meera Vasudevan as Jeeva
- Raaghav as Gausik
- Crazy Mohan as Rukku
- Santhana Bharathi as Jerry's father
- Madhan Bob as Janaki's father
- Maadhu Balaji as Master Maadhu
- Cheenu Mohan as Film Director
- Sachu as College Principal
- Neelu as Jerry's grandfather
- Chaams as Dhandapani
- Sathish as Farooque

== Production ==
The film's script was written by Crazy Mohan and he described the film as his "pet project" as he wanted to do create similar to Kadhalikka Neramillai (1964). The film was earlier titled Idhuthan Kadhal Enbathaa. Arul Vincent who earlier assisted P. C. Sreeram made his debut as cinematographer with this film. A dance number picturised on Ramesh and the three actresses were shot at a beach resort near Mahabalipuram.

== Soundtrack ==
The soundtrack was composed by Ramesh Vinayakam.

- "Hollywood" – Sharreth, Subiksha
- "Kanava" – Sujatha
- "En Swasathil" – Madhu Balakrishnan, Kalyani Nair
- "Kapildevda" – David Bhaskar
- "Naan Pudicha" – Ramesh Vinayagam, Vidya

== Critical reception ==
Malini Mannath of Chennai Online wrote "'Jerry' is more like a Crazy Mohan play gone bad. A laugh riot gone awry. A film that is an insult to audience inelligence [sic]". Sify wrote "Crazy Mohan and Kamalhassan have given us some great comedies in the past. But this time, the writer disappoints as the comedy in Jery fails to evoke any laughter. The film falls flat as Crazy is clueless, debutant director Kanthan is helpless and hero Ramesh is pure teakwood!". Lajjavathi of Kalki wrote it is surprising that director Kanthan stumbled despite having a great plot for comedy. She added that it is disappointing that the film was made like a drama without setting the scenes for cinema. Cinesouth wrote, "Many scenes may remind one of dramas, but one feels happy about the festival of comedy".
