= Chinna Vathiyar =

1995 film by Singeetam Srinivasa Rao

- Theatrical release poster
- Directed by: Singeetam Srinivasa Rao
- Written by: Crazy Mohan (dialogues)
- Screenplay by: Singeetam Srinivasa Rao
- Story by: Singeetam Srinivasa Rao
- Produced by: Alamelu Subramaniam
- Starring: Prabhu; Khushbu; Ranjitha
- Cinematography: R. Raghunatha Reddy
- Edited by: Ganesh Kumar
- Music by: Ilaiyaraaja
- Production company: Swathi Chithra International
- Release date: 15 May 1995
- Running time: 132 minutes
- Country: India
- Language: Tamil

Chinna Vathiyar (transl. Young Teacher) is a 1995 Indian Tamil-language science fiction comedy film written and directed by Singeetam Srinivasa Rao. The film stars Prabhu in a dual role, Khushbu, Ranjitha, Goundamani, Senthil and Nizhalgal Ravi. Music was by Ilaiyaraaja and lyrics were by Vaali. The comedy subplot was inspired by Crazy Mohan's play Madhu +2. The film was successful at the box office.

== Plot ==
The story revolves around a professor named Chandramouli, who experiments on transferring the soul from one body to another. Professor Chandramouli is married to Janaki. He got help from a student named Aravind, who is bright and a star in the school. The story begins when the two souls of professor and Aravind are transferred and it makes it uncomfortable to both parties and their girls. Meanwhile, a wealthy girl-abuser Baba took professor's favourite student and sold her to a gang. However, soul-changed professor and Aravind came to rescue her, where Baba flees from the police. Baba learns of the miracle medicine produced by the professor to change souls and when the soul changed professor and Aravind came to correct their souls at a cemetery, professor gets changed, but Aravind's soul went on to a cat. Baba came quickly and hit professor and Baba changed his soul to Aravind's body. The cat with Aravind's soul is put into a nearby well and he flees with the miracle medicine. The new Aravind behaves differently and misbehaves. Finally, the professor realises the change. He finally found the miracle medicine which was hidden in the worshipped anthill. At last after a series of events, Aravind's soul is released from the cat and Baba's soul is trapped within a chicken.

== Cast ==
- Prabhu as Professor Chandramouli and Aravind
- Khushbu as Janaki
- Ranjitha as Mythili
- Nizhalgal Ravi as Baba
- Goundamani as Astrologer
- Senthil as Astrologer's friend
- Kovai Sarala as Vimala
- Delhi Ganesh as Aravind's father
- Bhagyalakshmi as Bhagyasri
- Chinni Jayanth as Chinni
- C. R. Parthiban as Sr. Doctor
- Crazy Mohan as Doctor
- R. S. Shivaji
- S. N. Lakshmi
- Dharani as Maragadam, the astrologer's wife
- Idichapuli Selvaraj as K. Sethuraman
- Pasi Sathya

== Production ==
The film was initially titled Professor, and the team subsequently chose to change title hoping to appeal to the Tamil speaking audience. The comedy subplot was inspired by Crazy Mohan's play Madhu +2.

== Soundtrack ==
The soundtrack was composed by Ilaiyaraaja, with lyrics written by Vaali.

| Song | Singer(s) |
|---|---|
| "Vatta Pandhu" | Mano, K. S. Chithra |
| "Intha Padukaiyile" | K. S. Chithra |
| "Kanmaniye Kanmaniye" | S. P. Balasubrahmanyam, Rohini |
| "Love Pannidathan" | S. P. Balasubrahmanyam, K. S. Chithra |
| "Atha Maga Rathiname" | Malaysia Vasudevan, Uma Ramanan |

== Legacy ==
Chinna Vathiyar attained cult status in Tamil cinema for the Senthil-Goundamani comedy track.
