= Aunty (film) =

- Title card
- Directed by: Mouli
- Screenplay by: Janardhana Maharshi
- Produced by: TVD Prasad
- Starring: Jayasudha; Nassar; Anand; Nagendra Babu; Chinna; Raja Ravindra
- Cinematography: V. Srinivasa Reddy
- Music by: Ramesh
- Release date: 1995
- Country: India
- Language: Telugu

Aunty is a 1995 Indian Telugu language romantic comedy drama film directed by Mouli. The film stars Jayasudha, Nassar, Anand, Chinna and Raja Ravindra. It is remade into Kannada in 2001 as Aunty Preethse.

== Plot ==
The story revolves around three young men who fall in love with a pretty older woman who had moved into their neighbourhood.

== Cast ==
- Jayasudha as Jyothi
- Nassar
- Anand as Anand
- Chinna
- Raja Ravindra as Chanti
- Brahmanandam
- Kota Srinivasa Rao
- Rudra
- Nagendra Babu
- Krishnaveni
- Kalpana
- Tanikella Bharani

== Soundtrack ==
Soundtrack was composed by Ramesh.

Song	Artist(s)
"Chick Mango"	Mano, Ramesh
"Oka Tariki"	Chitra
"Pillabhale"	Mano, Swarnalatha
"Tala Tala"	S. P. Balasubrahmanyam
"Dimba Dimbaro"	Mano

== Reception ==
Griddaluru Gopalrao of Zamin Ryot wrote that the aunty character named Jyothi gave life to the film and concluded that this is an forgettable role in Jayasudha's acting career. The reviewer also praised the performance of other members of the cast (Anand, Raja Ravindra and Brahmanandam), the music and the cinematography.
