= 10th Cinema Express Awards =

1990 Indian film awards ceremony

- Date: 1990

Highlights
- Best Picture: Apoorva Sagodharargal

The 10th Cinema Express Awards were held in 1990, and honoured the best of South Indian films released in 1989.

== Tamil ==
Category	Recipient	Film
Best Film		Apoorva Sagodharargal
Best Actor	Kamal Haasan	Apoorva Sagodharargal
Best Actress	Bhanupriya	Aararo Aariraro
Best Director	Fazil	Varusham 16
Best Director - Special Prize	Singeetam Srinivasa Rao	Apoorva Sagodharargal
Best Supporting Actor	Nizhalgal Ravi	Nyaya Tharasu
Best Supporting Actress	Lakshmi	Ore Oru Gramathiley
Best Story Writer	Panchu Arunachalam	Raja Chinna Roja
Best Lyricist	Vaali	Apoorva Sagodharargal (for song "Unnai Nenachen")

== Malayalam ==
Category	Recipient	Film
Best Film		Ramji Rao Speaking
Best Actor	Kamal Haasan	Chanakyan
Best Actress	Rekha	Dasharatham, Ramji Rao Speaking
Best Director	Hariharan	Oru Vadakkan Veeragatha
