= Poikkal Kudhirai (1983 film) =

- Theatrical release poster
- Directed by: K. Balachander
- Screenplay by: K. Balachander
- Based on: Marriage Made in Saloon by Crazy Mohan
- Starring: Ramakrishna; Viji
- Cinematography: B. S. Lokanath
- Edited by: N. R. Kittu
- Music by: M. S. Viswanathan
- Production company: Kalaivani Productions
- Release date: 2 September 1983
- Country: India
- Language: Tamil

Poikkal Kudhirai (transl. Horse with fake legs) is a 1983 Indian Tamil-language romantic comedy film directed by K. Balachander, starring Ramakrishna and Viji. Lyricist Vaali made his acting debut through this film. Kamal Haasan appeared in a guest role. Poikkal Kudhirai was based on Crazy Mohan's play Marriage Made in Saloon. The film was released on 2 September 1983, and became an average success. It was remade in Kannada as Mavanige Thakka Aliya (1992).

== Plot ==
Poikkal Kuthirai depicts how Sambandam — who bets on each and every small thing and wins — and Indu enter into a bet at a saloon owned by Muthu. The bet is that Indu will win Sambadam's daughter Janaki's heart and marry her. If Indhu is successful in his mission, Sambandam will shave half of his moustache for their marriage. If he fails, Indhu will shave his head. Who wins the bet is the film's narrative.

== Cast ==
- Ramakrishna as Indhu
- Charle as Paramasivam
- Vaali as Sambandham
- Raveendran as Muthu
- Radha Ravi as Nair
- Viji as Janaki
- Pavithra as Stella
- Oru Viral Krishna Rao as Doctor
- Balumohan as Mohan
- K. S. Jayalakshmi
- Krishnan as Munusami
- Kamal Haasan as himself acted inside photo frame (guest appearance)
- Suhasini Maniratnam (guest appearance in the song "Unnai Enakku")
- Vanitha (guest appearance in the song "Unnai Enakku")
- Gopinath Rao
- Kuyili (uncredited)

== Production ==
Poikkal Kudhirai is based on Crazy Mohan's play Marriage Made in Saloon. Lyricist Vaali made his acting debut in Tamil with this film. Mohan wrote the dialogues, making his feature film debut.

== Soundtrack ==
Soundtrack was composed by M. S. Viswanathan and lyrics were written by Vaali.

Track listing
No.	Title	Singer(s)	Length
1.	"Ellam Therigiradhu"	S. P. Balasubrahmanyam, Kousalya
2.	"Naan Ore Oru"	Ramani, Malaysia Vasudevan
3.	"Pottuvecha Ponnukkaga"	Malaysia Vasudevan, Vani Jairam
4.	"Vaai Vittu Siricha"	Malaysia Vasudevan
5.	"Unnai Enakku"	S. P. Balasubrahmanyam

== Critical reception ==
Mukundhan of Kalki praised the acting of Ramakrishna and Raveender but panned the acting of Vaali and concluded if this film does not get the response like other comedy films then the loss is not for Balachander. Balumani of Anna praised the acting, music and dialogues.
