= Maadhu Balaji =

Indian actor

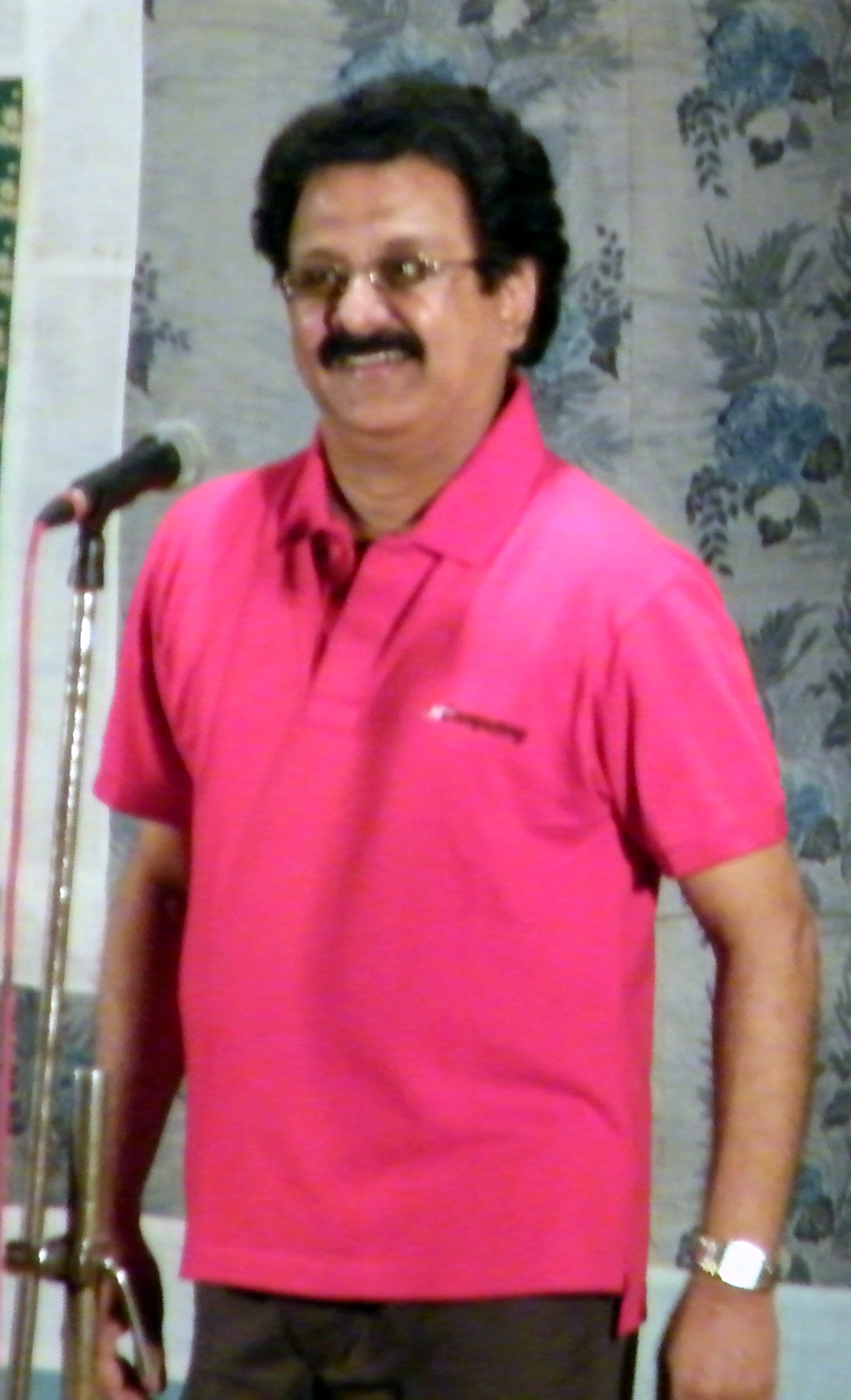
- Maadhu Balaji in Chocolate Krishna
- Born: Balaji Rangachari
- Occupation: Comedy actor
- Family: Crazy Mohan (brother)

Maadhu Balaji, born as Balaji Rangachari, is an Indian actor and comedian known for his roles in Tamil theatre plays and television serials.

== Career ==
Balaji has acted in a number of stage plays and films. He is the brother of the humorist and playwright Crazy Mohan. He gave himself the prefix "Maadhu" after Nagesh's name in Ethir Neechal (1968).

Balaji graduated from the Vivekananda College, Madras University in Chennai. His stage career started during his college days where he started acting in a number of stage plays and dramas and was touted as a prospective stage and film actor.

With Mohan and close friends, Maadhu Balaji established Crazy Creations in 1979, one of the leading drama troupes in Tamil stage today, with a history of 15 launches and over 5000 shows all around the globe.

Balaji acts as Maadhu, the lead role in all these dramas and has the track record of not missing even one of these shows.

== Theatre ==
Some of popular Tamil dramas as an actor are listed below.

- Maadhu +2
- Jurassic Baby
- Marriage Made in Saloon
- Meesai Aanaalum Manaivi
- Alaavudeenum 100 Watts Bulbum
- Crazy Kishkintha
- Return of Crazy Thieves
- Oru Babiyin Diary Kurippu
- Kathalikka Maadhu Undu
- Maadhu Mirandal
- Madhil Mel Maadhu
- Chocolate Krishna
- Satellite Saamiyaar
- Oru Sontha Veedu Vaadagai Veedagirathu
- Ayya Amma Ammamma
- Google Gadothgajan
- Crazy Premier League (CPL)
- Veetai Maatri Katti Paar
- Kalyanam Yematri Panni Paar
- Kudumbam Pirithhu Nadathi Paar

== Films ==
Year	Title	Role	Notes
1989	Chinna Chinna Aasaigal		
1999	Poovellam Kettuppar	Balaji	
2006	Jery	Master Maadhu	

== Television serials ==
Maadhu Balaji has acted as hero in several television serials including:

- Penn of Suhasini
- Crazy Times (Vijay TV)
- Siri Gama Padhani
- Nil Gavani Crazy (Sun TV)
- Maadhu Cheenu
- Here is Crazy
- Vidathu Sirippu (2004)
- Crazy Times
- Siri Siri Crazy (2016)
- Aachi International of AVM
- Nil Gavani Crazy, directed by S. B. Khanthan and written by Crazy Mohan, 66 episodes on Jaya TV
- Siri-ga-ma-pa-da-ni ran 108 successful weeks, produced by GDR Communications and written by Crazy Mohan
- Chaaru Latha – Written and Directed by S. B. Khanthan
- Chinna Mani-Peria Mani of Y. G. Mahendran
- Flight 172 and Sundaram & Sons of T. S. B. K. Moulee
- Nine TV Serials of Crazy Mohan directed by S. B. Khanthan
