= Thedinen Vanthathu =

- Poster
- Directed by: Ravi Varma
- Screenplay by: Crazy Mohan
- Story by: Ravi Varma
- Produced by: Vijayalakshmi Srinivasan; Kanchana Sivaraman
- Starring: Prabhu; Goundamani; Mantra; Amrutha
- Cinematography: Shiva
- Edited by: D. S. R. Subhash
- Music by: Sirpy
- Production company: Shiva Shree Pictures
- Release date: 30 October 1997
- Running time: 150 minutes
- Country: India
- Language: Tamil

Thedinen Vanthathu (transl. I searched, it came) is a 1997 Indian Tamil-language comedy film directed by Ravi Varma, who co-wrote the film alongside Crazy Mohan. The film stars Prabhu, Goundamani, Mantra and Amrutha. It was released on 30 October 1997, during Diwali.

== Plot ==
Velumani is an innocent watchman stationed at a bank. He loses his job after two robbers steal ₹1 crore (equivalent to ₹5.1 crore or US$530,000 in 2023) from the bank. In a misunderstanding, a hotel manager thinks that Velumani is a bank manager. Tamizhmani, the hotel steward, knows his secret but Velumani manages him by giving him a lottery ticket. The next day, they have the winning numbers. Tamizhmani immediately resigns from his job, but the lottery ticket is revealed to be fake.

Viswanathan has two daughters: Mythili and Janaki. Viswanathan has been looking for grooms for several years and decides to ask an astrologer about it. The astrologer tells him that grooms will approach him soon. Accidentally, the bank robbers' bag and the astrologer's bag get interchanged. Then, many bags get interchanged. Finally, Velumani and Tamizhmani get the money bag and they hide it in an unoccupied house. Soon the house gets occupied by Viswanathan's family. A racy and funny chase begins for the money bag.

== Cast ==
- Prabhu as Velumani / 'Coimbatore' Gopalakrishnan
- Goundamani as Tamizhmani / 'Pollachi' Ponnusamy
- Mantra as Janaki
- Amrutha as Mythili
- Vennira Aadai Moorthy as Viswanathan
- Anuradha as Visalam
- Balu Anand as Peter Pandian
- Prathap K. Pothan as Vicky
- Crazy Mohan as Bank Manager
- Idichapuli Selvaraj as Hotel Owner
- Gowtham Sundararajan as Thief
- Vichu Viswanath as Thief
- Meesai Murugesan
- M. R. Krishnamurthy as Vastu Consultant cum Exorcist
- Kullamani as Exorcist's assistant
- Marimuthu
- Jayamani as Smuggler
- Manohar
- Kovai Senthil as an Astrologer

== Production ==
A tennis scene involving Prabhu and Goundamani was shot at SDAT Tennis Stadium.

== Soundtrack ==
The soundtrack was composed by Sirpy, with lyrics written by Palani Bharathi.

Song	Singer(s)	Duration
"Aalps Malaikkaattru"	Hariharan, Bhavatharini	5:00
"Puyaladikkum Neramidhu"	Swarnalatha	4:31
"Thannikkullae Neendhuralae"	Mano, Sirpy	4:30
"Twinkle Staaru"	Mano	4:44
"Vaanam Ethuvaraikkum"	Mano	4:49

== Reception ==
K. N. Vijiyan of New Straits Times wrote, "This movie is a real "belly-jerker". Go for it", lauding Crazy Mohan's dialogues, the music and the fact that Goundamani was given equal importance as Prabhu.
