= Cheenu Mohan =

Indian actor

- Born: 17 May 1956; Tamil Nadu
- Died: 27 December 2018 (aged 62)
- Occupation: Actor
- Years active: 1987–2018

Cheenu Mohan (17 May 1956 – 27 December 2018) was an Indian actor who appeared in Tamil language films and plays. He acted in films including Thalapathi (1991) and Iraivi (2016).

== Career ==
Mohan began his career as a stage actor in the late 1970s, portraying a lead role in plays written by Crazy Mohan. His character name of 'Cheenu' in Crazy Mohan plays, became an identification mark of him since then. He portrayed small roles in Varusham Padhinaaru (1989), Mani Ratnam's Anjali (1990) and Thalapathi (1991). His involvement in theatre and his reluctance to move into television roles, meant that roles in the film industry had evaded him.

He made a comeback by portraying a supporting role in Karthik Subbaraj's multi-starrer Iraivi (2016). Featuring as the antiques dealer John, who tries to hold together a breaking family, Cheenu Mohan received critical acclaim for his work in the film. A critic called his performance "fantastic in the melodramatic scenes". Appreciation for his performance in the film meant that he was later selected to feature in Manikandan's Aandavan Kattalai (2016) and Vetrimaaran's Vada Chennai (2017); his role in the latter film was deleted.

== Death ==
Mohan died on 27 December 2018 due to cardiac arrest.

== Filmography ==
Year	Film	Role	Notes
1987	Kavithai Paada Neramillai		
1989	Varusham Padhinaaru		
1990	Anjali		
1991	Thalapathi		
1992	Kilipetchu Ketkava		
1992	Thalaivasal		
1993	Amaravathi		
1997	Iruvar	Assistant director	
1999	Paattali		
2003	Whistle	PT Master	
2006	Jerry	Film Director	
2016	Iraivi	John	
2016	Aandavan Kattalai	Passport officer	
2018	Sketch	Gayathri's father	
2018	Kolamavu Kokila	Police constable	
2019	Monster	TNEB officer	
2019	100	David	
2020	Mamakiki	Kranthi's father	Released on ZEE5
2020	Thatrom Thookrom	Rajamanickam	
2021	E P KO 306		
2021	Sangathalaivan		
2021	Sivaranjiniyum Innum Sila Pengalum		

== Theatre ==
Some of popular Tamil dramas as an actor are listed below.

- Maadhu +2
- Jurassic Baby
- Marriage Made in Saloon
- Meesai Aanaalum Manaivi
- Alaavudeenum 100 Watts Bulbum
- Crazy Kishkintha
- Return of Crazy Thieves
- Madhu Cheenu
- Kalyanam Panni Ppaar
- Kudumbam (Pirithu) Nadathi Paar
- Veetai (Maatri) Katti Paar
- Oru Babiyin Diary Kurippu
- Kathalikka Maadhu Undu
- Maadhu Mirandal
- Madhil Mel Maadhu
- Chocolate Krishna
- Satellite Saamiyaar
- Google Gadothgajan

== Television series ==
- Marmadesam Ragasiyam
- Madhil Mel Madhu
- Marriage Made In Saloon
- Return of Crazy Thieves
- Madhu plus 2
- Aachi International
- Crazy Times
- Vidathu Sirippu (2004)
- Maadhu Cheenu
- Nil Gavani Crazy (Sun TV)
- Annamalai (Sun TV)
- Kallachirippu (ZEE5)
