= Kaathala Kaathala =

1998 Indian film by Singeetham Srinivasa Rao

- Theatrical release poster
- Directed by: Singeetham Srinivasa Rao
- Screenplay by: Kamal Haasan
- Dialogue by: Crazy Mohan
- Story by: Crazy Mohan
- Produced by: P. L. Thenappan
- Starring: Kamal Haasan; Prabhu Deva; Soundarya; Rambha
- Cinematography: Tirru
- Edited by: N. P. Satish
- Music by: Karthik Raja
- Production company: Saraswathi Films
- Distributed by: Raaj Kamal Films International
- Release date: 10 April 1998
- Country: India
- Language: Tamil

Kaathala Kaathala (transl. Oh love! Oh love!) is a 1998 Indian Tamil-language romantic comedy film directed by Singeetham Srinivasa Rao and produced by P. L. Thenappan. The film stars Kamal Haasan, Prabhu Deva, Soundarya and Rambha. It revolves around two men falling in love with two women, but end up creating a web of lies trying to impress their lovers' fathers.

Kaathala Kaathala was initially expected to be directed by K. S. Ravikumar, but he was replaced by Rao after he refused to sign the film until the Film Employees Federation of South India (FEFSI) strike of 1997 had stopped. The film was released on 10 April 1998 and became a commercial success. It was later loosely remade in Hindi as Housefull (2010).

== Plot ==
Ramalingam and Sundaralingam are orphans who care for orphaned children. While Sundaralingam paints shop banners and calendars, Ramalingam usually earns money by fraudulent means. Once, he even worked for a fake godman Ananda Vikadanantha and regretted it. Sundari, an arts student, falls in love with Ramalingam. Her friend, Janaki, falls in love with Sundaralingam. Janaki's father, Paramasivam, objects to Janaki's wedding since Sundaralingam is poor, prompting Janaki and Sundaralingam to marry with the help of their friends.

Days go by, but Paramasivam still does not agree. This causes Sundari to ask Janaki to lie to Paramasivam and say that she has given birth to a son. Paramasivam, upon receiving the letter, changes his mind and gets ready to set off to Chennai. Sundari lies to her Chicago-based father, Balamurugan, that Ramalingam is a rich man. Janaki, to easily convince her parents, also fabricates a story that Sundaralingam has become rich. The girls rent a bungalow for three days; the owner, Noorjahan, mistakes Janaki and Ramalingam as a couple.

Balamurugan, who is supposed to come on that day, misses his flight. Janaki's parents wish to surprise her, and they end up coming on that day. Ramalingam mistakes Janaki's father for Sundari's father, and a comedy of errors ensues. Unable to tell the truth due to Noorjahan's presence, Janaki and Ramalingam let the mistaken identity stay as such. To keep the tale running, Janaki and Ramalingam introduce Sundari as the maidservant and Sundaralingam as the cook. Sundari borrows a child from a beggar woman, who stays in the house as the woman who supplies milk.

The four of them strive hard to hide the truth from Janaki's parents. While these happenings unfold, Varadhachaari, Paramasivam's friend, who knows the truth, comes over. The couples try to salvage the web of lies they have built by getting Varadhachaari and Paramasivam to agree. Unfortunately, they then meet with Janaki's maternal uncle, Singaram, a doubting Thomas who begins to suspect the veracity of the stories. All the same, he fails to convince his sister and brother-in-law of the possible untruths they have been led to believe.

Now that Balamurugan is also about to meet them, Paramasivam himself steps in to help them build a story involving Balamurugan's daughter, whom he views as a maidservant in the house. He concocts a complicated tale where Ramalingam is his son, Janaki and Sundaralingam reprise their real relationship, and worse, V. Anand (formerly Ananda Vikadanantha) is his cousin. The real reason Anand is at their place is to hide from the police, as he is wanted for his fraudulent ways. Soon enough, the elders begin to smell something fishy. To end the mess, Sundari reveals the complete truth to everyone. Singaram reveals to all that Anand is a crook and Ramalingam is now forced to prove his innocence.

A chase ensues when Anand is held hostage by his ex-partner, Junior Vikadanantha, for money that he looted. Inspector Chokkalingam arrives in time to find Ananda Vikadanantha and Junior, and Ramalingam is proven innocent. Paramasivam accepts Janaki and Sundaralingam, and Balamurugan is happy about Ramalingam and Sundari.

== Cast ==
- Kamal Haasan as Ramalingam
- Prabhu Deva as Sundaralingam
- Soundarya as Stella Sundari (Voice dubbed by Savitha Radhakrishnan)
- Rambha as Janaki (Voice dubbed by Uma Bharani)
- Vadivelu as Singaaram
- Delhi Ganesh as the landlord
- Moulee as Balamurugan
- Cho as Varadhachaari
- Nagesh as Chokkalingam
- Srividya as Parvathy
- S. N. Lakshmi as Noorjahan
- Kovai Sarala as Junior Vikadanantha's wife
- V. M. C. Haneefa as Ananda Vikadanantha (V. Anand)
- M. S. Viswanathan as Paramasivam
- Crazy Mohan as Junior Vikadanantha
- Ajay Rathnam as Williamson
- Omakuchi Narasimhan as the astrologer
- Madhan Bob as the registrar
- Master Mahendran as an orphan child
- C. K. Saraswathi as Bhangaru Dhamodhar Naidu

== Production ==
Kaathala Kaathala was initially expected to be directed by K. S. Ravikumar who directed the successful Avvai Shanmugi with Kamal Haasan in the lead earlier, but he was later replaced by Singeetham Srinivasa Rao after he refused to sign the film until the Film Employees Federation of South India (FEFSI) strike of 1997 had stopped. Actresses Meena and Simran's unavailability led to Rambha being cast in a lead role. Nagma also opted against signing the film fearing that a potential clash may arise with actress Rambha, after the pair's alleged fall out on the sets of Janakiraman. After Soundarya's death in 2004, Haasan paid tribute to her when he said, "she came forward to do the movie, when the rest of the industry was unwilling to work with me." Cho Ramaswamy, wanting to express solidarity with Haasan's stand during the strike, asked him for a role in the film and got it. It eventually became his final film as actor.

== Soundtrack ==
The soundtrack was composed by Karthik Raja and lyrics were written by Vaali.

Track listing
No.	Title	Singer(s)	Length
1.	"Saravana Bhava"	Kamal Haasan, Karthik Raja, Sripriya, Sujatha
2.	"Madonna Paadala"	Kamal Haasan, Kavita Paudwal
3.	"Thakida Thathom Annachi"	Ilaiyaraaja, Jack
4.	"Kaasumela"	Kamal Haasan, Udit Narayan
5.	"Madonna Paadala" (II)	Hariharan, Bhavatharini
6.	"Laila Laila"	Hariharan, Bhavatharini, Sripriya, Prasanna

== Release and reception ==
Kaathala Kaathala was released on 10 April 1998. D. S. Ramanujam for The Hindu wrote, "Veteran director Singeetham Srinivasarao (his penchant for comedy is well-known), actor and screenplay writer Kamal Hassan and story and dialogue writer ``Crazy″ Mohan have a large say in sparking fun, Mohan being at his `craziest' best. The pun-laden lines come in such a wave that before one can enjoy one humourous [sic] line, the other just smashes in". R. Mahadevan of Dinakaran noted "writers like [Crazy] Mohan make this celluloid affair of filmy entertainment stand on a more fanciful ground of pure comedy --- with ease and veritable success". Ji of Kalki, however, reviewed the film more negatively, criticising it for lacking the humour of Haasan and Mohan's previous ventures. The film was dubbed in Telugu as Navvandi Lavvandi in late 1998.

In 2010, the producer of the film P. L. Thenappan threatened legal action against the makers of the Hindi film Housefull for remaking scenes from the film without permission. Thenappan revealed he had dubbed the film into Hindi in the late 1990s as Mirchi Masala, but the version did not release.

== Legacy ==
The line "Jaanaki enakku wife aagittathaala, Sundari velakkaari aayittaappaa" (Ever since Janaki became my wife, Sundari became a housemaid) became popular, and has since entered Tamil vernacular as a term used by people to "tease friends caught impersonating". The song "Kaasumela" became popular for Prabhu Deva's dance. The title of the song inspired a 2018 film Kasu Mela Kasu.
