= Penn (1991 TV series) =

2019 Indian web series

- Genre: Drama
- Created by: Charuhasan
- Written by: Suhasini Maniratnam
- Directed by: Suhasini Maniratnam
- Starring: Revathi; Bhanupriya; Geetha; Radhika; Amala; Shobana; Saranya; Suhasini
- Music by: Ilaiyaraaja
- Country of origin: India
- Original language: Tamil
- No. of seasons: 1
- No. of episodes: 8

Production
- Cinematography: G. P. Krishna
- Editors: B. Lenin; Gopal

Original release
- Network: Madras Doordarshan
- Release: 1991

Penn is a 1991 Indian drama anthology miniseries directed by Suhasini Maniratnam and produced by Charuhasan. The series on Madras Doordarshan featured eight standalone episodes examining the lives of South Indian women. Actresses Revathi, Bhanupriya, Geetha, Radhika, Amala, Shobana, Saranya and Suhasini herself play the lead roles in the eight episodes, with an ensemble set of other actors in supporting roles. The series has music composed by Ilaiyaraaja, cinematography by G. P. Krishna and editing by B. Lenin and Gopal. The series was released in 1991.

== Cast ==
Hemavukku Kalyanam

- Revathi as Hema
- Charuhasan as Hema's father
- Srividya as Hema's mother
- Nithya as Hema's sister
- Baby Raasi as the young version of Hema
- Baby Neena as the young version of Hema's sister

Appa Appadithan

- Gemini Ganesan as Sharada's father
- Bhanupriya as Sharada
- Bhanu Chander as Chandrasekhar
- Rajyalakshmi as Sujatha
- A. V. Ramanan as Chandrasekhar's brother
- Lakshmipriya as Sharada's mother
- Mythili as Chandrasekar's sister-in-law
- Priya as Priya

Appa Irukken

- Geetha
- Chandrahasan
- A. V. Ramanan
- Kakinada Shyamala
- Devika Rani
- Geetha Nagarajan
- Meena
- Vikram Raj

Mrs Ranganath

- Radhika
- Sarath Babu
- Master Richard
- Baby Divya
- Susheela Ranganath
- Veeraraghavan
- Raghavendar
- Veerasamy
- Balaji
- Krishnan

Kutty Anand

- Amala
- Nizhalgal Ravi
- Master Anand
- Kutty Padmini
- Poornam Viswanathan
- Vani
- Gayathri

Love Story

- Shobana
- Nithya
- Priya
- Radhabhai
- Raja
- Venky

Raji Maathiri Ponnu

- Sowcar Janaki
- Raghuvaran
- Saranya

Vaarthai Thavari Vittai

- Parthiban
- Suhasini Maniratnam

== Episodes ==
No.	Title	Directed by	Original release date
1	"Hemavukku Kalyanam"	Suhasini Maniratnam	1991
2	"Appa Appadithan"	Suhasini Maniratnam	1991
3	"Appa Irukken"	Suhasini Maniratnam	1991
4	"Mrs Ranganath"	Suhasini Maniratnam	1991
5	"Kutty Anand"	Suhasini Maniratnam	1991
6	"Love Story"	Suhasini Maniratnam	1991
7	"Raji Maathiri Ponnu"	Suhasini Maniratnam	1991
8	"Vaarthai Thavari Vittai"	Suhasini Maniratnam	1991

== Production ==
Suhasini Maniratnam made her debut as a director through Penn, a mini-series with standalone episodes focusing on the lives of South Indian women.

V. Priya, who later moved on to work as a film writer and director, made her debut as an actress through the series. She noted she was inspired by Suhasini's style of film-making and the process inspired her to take up a career in the film industry.
