= S. B. Khanthan =

Tamil film director

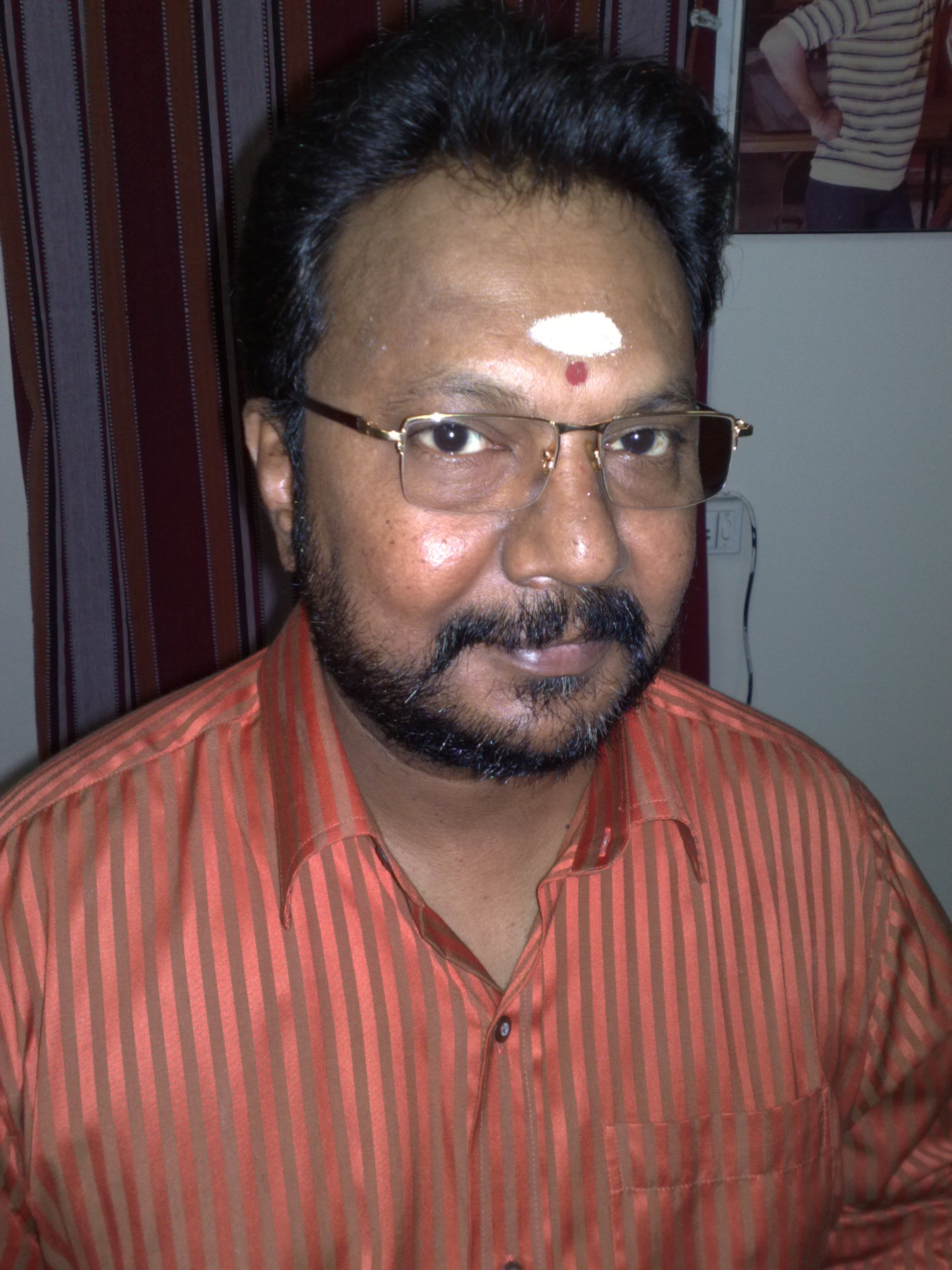
- S. B. Khanthan is a Chartered Accountant and creative director
- Born: Chennai, Tamilnadu, India
- Occupation: Creative Director
- Parent: T. S. Balakrishna Sastrigal

S. B. Khanthan is an Indian film director, best known for his 2006 movie Jerry. He has also directed several stage plays, advertisements, and documentaries.

== Filmography ==
=== Animation film ===
Prior to his directorial debut, Khanthan co-directed the first-ever 3D Animation film produced in India titled Pandavas: The Five Warriors, intended for Hollywood and American children.

=== As film director ===
- Jerry (2006)

== Television ==
=== Telefilms ===
Khanthan has also directed several telefilms written by Crazy Mohan, including Ganapathikku Kalyanam, Ganesanukku Kaalkattu, Sirippu Thirai and Computer Kaadal. Khanthan directed a telefilm written by director Mouli titled Naan Ready Nee Readiya which was telecast on Star Vijay TV.

=== Serials ===
- Directed first serial in 1986-87 in DD1 titled Here is Crazy - 13 weeks. He went on to direct all the TV serials written by the humorist Shri Crazy Mohan
- Maadhu-Cheenu - 7 Weeks in DD Metro, Singapore and Malaysian TVs; Now retelecasted Won Best Director award by Mylapore Academy.
- Nil Gavani Crazy - 66 Weeks in Sun TV and Jaya TV
- Si-Ri-Ga-Ma-Pa-Da-Ni - 106 Weeks in Raj TV and Jaya TV
- Oru Babyin Diary - 16 Weeks in DD1 and Malaysian TV
- Pathukku Pathu - 42 Weeks in DD, National-Tamil
- Crazy Times - 85 weeks in Star Vijay TV
- Vidathu Sirippu –75 Weeks in Jaya TV
- Siri Siri Crazy – 15 Weeks in Kalaignar TV
- He wrote and directed a serial for Sun TV produced by director Vasanth titled Charu-Latha which ran for 40 weeks.

== Stage plays ==
Khanthan is the Founder-Director of Crazy Creations. He has directed and contributed to the music choreography for plays staged by Crazy Mohan totaling to over 4500 shows in India, USA, Sri Lanka, Indonesia, Singapore, Kuwait and Hong Kong.

== Miscellaneous ==
=== Media ===
Khanthan has directed and produced various advertisements, corporate films, and documentaries under Studio Dream.

Notable works include:

- Tamil Nadu – Vision 2025 for Confederation of Indian Industries
- Motivational films for AREVA, Hindustan Latex Ltd and HDFC Bank
- Corporate film for Quality Inn Sabari Group of Hotels

=== Documentaries ===
- GNB - The Music Charmer – An insight into the musical legend GNB on his birth centenary
- Mridanga Chintamanihi – The Magnum Opus of the Percussion Legend Umayalpuram Sri Sivaraman
- We Bow To You, Sir! – A short film on the Violin Maestro Shri Lalgudi G.Jayaraman, screened on the occasion of the Life Time Achievement Award conferred on him by Music Academy
- The Musicians’ Musician – An 80-minute musical film on Shri. Ramnad Krishnan, the carnatic music legend
- Sunaadha Vinodhan – An 85-minute documentary on Tanjore S. Kalyanaraman, another carnatic music legend
- Pada Varnams of Lalgudi G Jayaraman
- To Mark the Centenary Celebrations of Sangeetha Kalanidhi Mrs. T. Brinda Brindamma: Music Beyond Music – Film on Sangeetha Kalanidhi Mrs. T. Brinda

== Divine audio visual documentaries ==
- Mahaperiyava mani mantapam - Orirukkai
- Mahaperiyava mani mantapam – New jersey, USA
- Sri sathguru Sivan sar – the aathma gnaani
- Sri Seshadri swamigal – the brahma gnaani
- Sri Sivan sar – the divine move

=== Social works ===
- Gift of Time – on Time Management
- Mind To Serve – on how artificial limbs make people who are movement impaired return to normal life

== DVD ==
Khanthan was also responsible for converting the following stage plays to DVD formats to cater to the needs of the international audience.

- Maadhu Plus Two - In DVD format for US Viewers
- Marriage Made In Saloon - in DVD format for US Viewers
- Chocolate Krishna - in DVD format for US Viewers
- Pournami - Director K Balachander’s stage play in DVD format
- Oru Koodai Paasam – Director K Balachander’s stage play in DVD format
