= Avvai Shanmugi =

1996 film by K. S. Ravikumar

- Theatrical release poster
- Directed by: K. S. Ravikumar
- Written by: Crazy Mohan (unc.)
- Screenplay by: K. S. Ravikumar
- Produced by: R. Ravindran; K. P. Hari
- Starring: Kamal Haasan; Meena
- Cinematography: S. Murthy
- Edited by: K. Thanikachalam
- Music by: Deva
- Production company: Sree Mahalakshmi Combines
- Release date: 10 November 1996
- Running time: 161 minutes
- Country: India
- Language: Tamil

Avvai Shanmugi is a 1996 Indian Tamil-language screwball comedy film directed by K. S. Ravikumar and co-written by Crazy Mohan. The film stars Kamal Haasan and Meena, with Gemini Ganesan, Nagesh, Heera, Manivannan, Nassar, Delhi Ganesh and Ann in supporting roles. Inspired by the American film Mrs. Doubtfire (1993), it follows a divorcé who disguises as an elderly female housekeeper to be close to his daughter, whose custody is only with his ex-wife.

Avvai Shanmughi was released on 10 November 1996 and became a box office success, winning two Tamil Nadu State Film Awards: Best Make-up Artist (K. M. Sarathkumar) and Best Child Artist (Ann). A year later, the film was remade in Hindi as Chachi 420, with Haasan directing and reprising his role.

== Plot ==
Janaki, married to Pandian against the wishes of her wealthy father Vishwanathan Iyer, applies for a divorce after five years of marriage, citing various reasons. Pandian is an assistant dance choreographer with a modest income and is unable to spend much time with the family, and their house is small without many amenities that Janaki was used to. All this accumulates and Janaki is granted a divorce. She has the sole custody of their daughter Bharathi, whom Pandian can meet only once a week, his only solace. However, Bharathi loves him a lot and dislikes the arrangement.

Basha, Pandian's friend, advises him to steal his daughter from Janaki. Pandian assents, but in doing so, he is discovered; now he cannot meet her at all. Pandian later learns that Vishwanathan has advertised for a woman to look after his granddaughter. In a conversation with Joseph, a makeup artist, Pandian gets the idea of playing an old woman, so that he can be with Bharathi and Janaki without them knowing. Joseph agrees to this plan and the transformation is done from Pandian to "Avvai Shanmugi", a dignified, elderly Iyer woman.

Shanmugi applies for the job, but is rejected as another woman had been chosen. But when Bharathi is hurt while shooting fireworks and catches fire, Shanmugi throws her into the swimming pool against the wishes of the household, who believe that wrapping in a woollen blanket is the proper way to put out a fire. When the family doctor comes to take a look at Bharathi's wound, he praises Shanmugi for administering the right treatment, which causes Vishwanathan to reject the earlier hired nanny and hire Shanmugi. Soon after, all the family members start to become closer to Shanmugi, including Janaki and Bharathi. When Bharathi gets to properly meet Shanmugi, she recognises her father almost immediately, but agrees to conceal his secret.

Rathna is a girl who is in love with Pandian but is constantly rebuffed. Basha takes up the role of a mute Iyer cook and is admitted into Vishwanathan's house on the recommendation of Shanmugi, after the previous cook was caught stealing. However, Basha is caught while doing his namaz by Vishwanathan's secretary Sethuram Iyer, blowing his cover. Hilarious circumstances follow and slowly Shanmugi manages to convince the household of her sincerity, so much so that Vishwanathan begins to develop a liking for Shanmugi and in fact proposes to her too. Around the same time, Mudaliyar, the house-owner of the place where Pandian lives, happens to bump into Shanmugi and sympathises with her for being a widow. Eventually, Mudaliyar too begins to develop a liking for her.

Meanwhile, Pandian slowly begins to realise that Janaki has not totally forgotten him. Shanmugi rebuffs Vishwanathan's proposals by saying that her husband is alive. Adding to the chaos, she tells Vishwanathan that Joseph is her husband, while Pandian tells Sethuram Iyer that Mudaliyar is Shanmugi's husband. There is much confusion after this, but it is resolved at last. Shanmugi convinces Vishwanathan that Janaki's right place is by her husband. While Vishwanathan goes off to talk to his estranged son-in-law, Shanmugi reveals her true self as Pandian to Basha by removing her blouse. This is seen by Janaki, who misunderstands the scene and believes Shanmugi to be a seductress. In anguish, Janaki hurriedly starts her car and drives to Pandian's house.

Janaki reaches Pandian's house to reclaim him, but upon seeing Rathna waiting there, and Shanmugi's clothes lying around, thinks that her husband, too, is promiscuous. She again starts her car and drives to a bridge crying and attempts suicide by jumping into a river, but Shanmugi saves her and reveals her identity as Pandian. Janaki and Pandian reconcile, while Pandian "kills off" Shanmugi by attributing her "death" to drowning while saving Janaki.

== Cast ==
- Kamal Haasan as Avvai Shanmugi / Pandian
- Meena as Janaki Pandian (Voice dubbed by Uma Bharani)
- Gemini Ganesan as Vishwanathan Iyer
- Nagesh as Joseph
- Manivannan as Sambantham Mudaliyar
- Nassar as Basha
- Delhi Ganesh as Sethuram Iyer
- Heera as Rathna (dubbed by Savitha Radhakrishnan)
- Rani as Kousi
- Baby Ann as Bharathi
- Bayilvan Ranganathan as a temple visitor
- Idichapuli Selvaraj as a temple visitor
- Kavithalayaa Krishnan as a lawyer
- S. P. Balasubrahmanyam as Dr. Subbu (special appearance)
- Raghuram as himself (special appearance)
- Crazy Mohan as interviewer (special appearance)
- Ramesh Aravind as himself (special appearance in the song "Kalyanam Katcheri")
- Neelu as the judge
- Kanal Kannan as a rogue

Uncredited

- Kovai Senthil as a court clerk
- Kottai Perumal as Subburaj
- Peter Hein as a fighter
- K. S. Ravikumar as a spectator
- Crane Manohar as a vegetable buyer

== Production ==
=== Development ===
Jijo Punnoose wanted to make a film starring Kamal Haasan as a man dressed as a woman, but Haasan refused as the role was an adolescent woman whereas he wanted to play an elderly woman. Haasan later desired to do a film inspired by the American films Kramer vs. Kramer (1979) and Tootsie (1982) which became Avvai Shanmughi. He acknowledged the film's resemblance to another American film Mrs. Doubtfire (1993), but "I guess we were both inspired from the same source" since he had the idea for Avvai Shanmughi six years before the release of Mrs. Doubtfire. Haasan dedicated the film to his mentor stage actor 'Avvai' T. K. Shanmugam, who was known for playing female roles in stage plays.

=== Casting ===
Sivaji Ganesan was Ravikumar's initial choice for the role of Vishwanathan Iyer, which ultimately went to Gemini Ganesan (no relation). A debutant Sri Durga was initially chosen to play the character Rathna, but was ultimately replaced by Heera. Haasan's daughter Akshara was considered for playing the lead pair's daughter, but declined; the role went to Ann Alexia Anra, her feature film debut. Stunt master Kanal Kannan appeared in a small role of a street rogue. Maadhu Balaji was offered to act in the film, but declined. Ramesh Aravind made a cameo appearance in a song which he did only for Haasan.

=== Filming and design ===
The song "Kadhala Kadhala" was shot in South Africa. The make-up artist Michael Westmore provided advice alongside K. M. Sarathkumar as well as creating the makeup for the film. An initial photoshoot had Haasan dressed as a middle-aged woman, but it was later decided that he portray elderly woman. The padding and foundation used gave Haasan an allergic reaction beneath his eyes. The make-up took five hours to put on and lasts for only five more hours. Haasan wore a nine-yard saree in the film for the female character, with Sarika contributing to the costume designing. The stunts were choreographer by Peter Hein. The dubbing for Meena was given by actress Uma Bharani. Haasan and Crazy Mohan conceived the climax while driving back from Pondicherry.

== Soundtrack ==
The music was composed by Deva and the lyrics were written by Vaali. The song "Rukku Rukku" is set in the Carnatic ragas Sahana and Dwijavanthi. The song "Velai Velai" is inspired from "Workaholic" by 2 Unlimited. The song "Kadhala Kadhala" was reused as "Gham Hai Kyun" in the Hindi film Hamara Dil Aapke Paas Hai (2000), with change of instrumentation. "Velai Velai" was reused as "Super Darshini" in the Kannada film Baithare Baithare.

Tamil track listing
| No. | Title | Singer(s) | Length |
|---|---|---|---|
| 1. | "Rukku Rukku" | Kamal Haasan, Sujatha | 5:55 |
| 2. | "Kadhala Kadhala" | Hariharan, Sujatha | 5:46 |
| 3. | "Kalyanam Katcheri" | S. P. Balasubrahmanyam | 5:30 |
| 4. | "Velai Velai" | S. P. Balasubrahmanyam | 5:26 |
| 5. | "Kadhali Kadhali" | Hariharan | 5:44 |
| Total length: | | | 28:21 |

The film was dubbed in Telugu as Bhamane Satyabhamane.

Telugu (dubbed) track listing
| No. | Title | Singer(s) | Length |
|---|---|---|---|
| 1. | "New Jathe Nenai" | S. P. Balasubrahmanyam, K. S. Chithra |
| 2. | "Vintha Vintha" | S. P. Balasubrahmanyam |
| 3. | "Anuragam Andincha" | S. P. Balasubrahmanyam |
| 4. | "Rukku Rukku" | Kamal Haasan, S. P. Sailaja |

== Release and reception ==
Avvai Shanmughi was released on 10 November 1996, and performed well at the box office. The film was dubbed into Telugu as Bhamane Satyabhamane (1997). The Hindu praised the film, claiming it "turns out to be entertainer, mouthful from start to finish". The reviewer praised Haasan's portrayal of a woman by claiming that "few peers to Kamal Hassan who can do the female role with such perfection". Ananda Vikatan gave the film a score of 44 out of 100. However R. P. R. of Kalki gave a negative review who felt Haasan's make-up as an old woman does not match and his face struggles to show emotions due to make-up while also panning the humour and dialogues as vulgar and concluded saying this film may gain profits but it is a good example that even great artistes like Haasan can go contaminated for the sake of commercial purposes. The film won two Tamil Nadu State Film Awards: Best Make-up Artist (K. M. Sarathkumar) and Best Child Artist (Ann).

== Legacy ==
Avvai Shanmughi became a "textbook example" in Tamil cinema for slapstick humour. A year later, the film was remade in Hindi as Chachi 420, with Haasan directing and reprising his role. The background music and the scene where Pandiyan fights goons in an elderly woman getup were recreated by Jagathy Sreekumar in the Malayalam film Hitler Brothers (1997). The scene where Pandiyan looks for a sign board to think of a name for his elderly woman alter ego is recreated in Remo (2016) where Sivakarthikeyan's character looks at a sign board for his nurse getup.

== Bibliography ==
- Dhananjayan, G. (2011). The Best of Tamil Cinema, 1931 to 2010: 1977–2010. Galatta Media. OCLC 733724281.
