= T. S. B. K. Moulee =

Indian film director and actor

- Born: Thiruvidaimarudur Sambamoorthy Ganapathy Balakrishna Sastrigal Mouli; 14 March 1947 (age 79); Kanadukathan, Madras State, India
- Other names: Mouli, B Chandra Mouli, B C Mouli
- Occupations: Actor, film director
- Years active: 1973–present

T. S. B. K. Moulee (born: March 14, 1947 Thiruvidaimarudur Sambamoorthy Ganapathy Balakrishna Sastrigal Mouli) is an Indian film director, writer, playwright, and actor known for his works in Telugu and Tamil cinema. His films include Patnam Vachina Pativrathalu, the biographical sports drama film Ashwini, Kamal Haasan's Pammal K. Sambandam, and Nala Damayanthi.

Three of his popular plays were translated into Telugu and Bengali and were staged in Andhra Pradesh and West Bengal with a record of 4000 stage shows. He received the Kalaimamani Award for "Best Writer" in 1985 and the Nandi Award for five films. He has acted in more than 100 films in Tamil and Telugu apart from working as an actor.

== Early life ==
Mouli is the son of Harikatha exponent T. S. Balakrishna Sastrigal. Mouli was interested in acting and played parts in stage plays from his school days. As a school-going kid, he was fascinated by the plays of T. K. Shanmugam and Singanallur Venkataramana Iyer Sahasranamam, both noted personalities in producing stage plays at that time.

Although he pursued a BTech degree, he said he "could not resist the temptation to write plays". At 19, he wrote a 45-minute play and staged it at a function organised to felicitate actor Sivaji Ganesan for his Padma Shri award. In his college days, he was a part of Y. G. Parthasarathy's United Artists Association. However, Mouli first came into limelight in 1969 when he wrote the screenplay for and acted in the play "Flight No. 172". The play was a success and ran for thirty continuous years.

He then ventured into film direction despite not having worked as assistant director to anybody. In an interview he said "Actually neither acting nor direction was my goal when I got a chance to venture into cinema. I just wanted to be a writer. But when a producer approached me to make one of my plays into a film and offered me direction too, I took it up". His first feature film was Ivargal Vidhyasamaanavargal, which according to himself, "proved commercially viable" but his second film Matravai Neril, which he got to make, even before his first was completed, was commercially successful. The film made with newcomers, took just 25 days to complete the shoot, and ran for 100 days. He later directed two films under K. Balachander's banner, Anne Anne and Oru Pullanguzhal Adupputhugirathu and wrote the comedy track in Balachander's directorial Nizhal Nijamagiradhu besides acting in it. His film Vaa Indha Pakkam was dubbed in Telugu and introduced Mouli to the Telugu industry. The same producer approached him to do a direct Telugu film. He did not know the language but with the help of popular Telugu writer Jandhyala who translated his script, he made the film Patnam Vachina Pativrathalu with Chiranjeevi and Radhika. The film was successful, running for 280 days. he made over 20 Telugu films in the next 15 years.

== Personal life ==
Mouli is married and has two children – a daughter and a son. His daughter Shravanthi is a carnatic singer. He has a brother, S. B. Khanthan who is also a film and creative director.

== Filmography ==
=== As director ===
Year	Film	Language	Notes
1980	Mattravai Neril	Tamil	
1980	Ivargal Vidhiyasamanavargal	Tamil	
1981	Vaa Intha Pakkam	Tamil	
1982	Nandri, Meendum Varuga	Tamil	
1982	Oru Varisu Uruvagiradhu	Tamil	
1982	Patnam Vachina Pativrathalu	Telugu	
1983	Oru Pullanguzhal Aduppuppthugirathu	Tamil	
1983	Anney Anney	Tamil	
1985	Porutham	Tamil	
1986	Patnam Pilla Paleturi Chinnodu	Telugu	
1987	Rowdy Police	Telugu	
1987	Akshintalu	Telugu	
1987	Chandamama Rave	Telugu	
1988	O Bharya Katha	Telugu	
1988	Jeevana Ganga	Telugu	
1989	Paila Pacheesu	Telugu	
1990	Manasu Mamatha	Telugu	
1991	Manchi Roju	Telugu	
1991	Ashwini	Telugu	
1992	Hello Darling Lachipadama	Telugu	
1992	Adhrustam	Telugu	
1993	Aadarsham	Telugu	
1993	Aarambham	Telugu	
1993	Inspector Ashwini	Telugu	
1994	O Thandri O Koduku	Telugu	
1994	Andharu Andhare	Telugu	
1995	Aunty	Telugu	
1995	Miss 420	Telugu	
1996	Akka Bagunnava	Telugu	
1996	Pellala Rajyam	Telugu	
2000	Madhuri	Telugu	
2002	Pammal K. Sambandam	Tamil	
2003	Nala Damayanthi	Tamil	

=== As writer ===
Year	Film	Writer	Notes
1974	Penn Ondru Kanden	Story	
1979	Veettukku Veedu Vasappadi	Dialogue	
1982	Hitler Umanath	Screenplay	

=== As actor ===
Films

- Note: all films are in Tamil, unless otherwise noted.

Year	Film	Role	Notes
1973	Suryakanthi	Sama	
1974	Kai Niraya Kasu	Ramu's Boss	
1974	Anbai Thedi		
1975	Anbe Aaruyire	Alamelu's husband	
1975	Maalai Sooda Vaa		
1978	Nizhal Nijamagiradhu	Manmatha Naidu	
1983	Oru Pullanguzhal Adupputhukirathu		
1984	Mahanagaramlo Mayagadu		Telugu film
1985	Anney Anney	Krishnagiri	
1985	Oru Malarin Payanam		
1986	Unnidathil Naan	Francis	
1989	Apoorva Sagodharargal	Mano's father	
1992	Pranadaata		Telugu film
1997	Pistha	Dharmaraj	
1998	Unnidathil Ennai Koduthen	Viswanathan (Radha's father)	
1998	Kaathala Kaathala	Balamurugan	
1998	Time	Natarajan	
1999	Unnai Thedi	Sivaraman	
2000	Sandhitha Velai	Sivaraman	
2000	Pennin Manathai Thottu	Ganapathy	
2001	Alli Thandha Vaanam	Lakshmipathi	
2001	Kunguma Pottu Gounder	School principal	
2003	Nala Damayanthi	Immigration Officer	Director of this movie
2004	Cheppave Chirugali	Nirmala's father	Telugu film
2006	Thiruvilaiyaadal Aarambam	Chandramohan	
2006	Unakkum Enakkum	Krishnayya	
2008	Poi Solla Porom	Krishnayya	
2008	Pirivom Santhippom	Annamalai	
2009	Thiru Thiru Thuru Thuru	Srinivasan	
2010	Theeradha Vilaiyattu Pillai	Karthik's father	
2010	Irumbu Kottai Murattu Singam	Bilagiri James	
2010	Kadhal 2 Kalyanam		
2011	180	S. V. S. Murthy	Bilingual film
2013	Pattathu Yaanai		
2018	Seethakaathi	Parasuraman	
2019	Embiran	Jeya's grandfather	
2020	Mookuthi Amman	Engels' grandfather	
2021	Maara	Velayya	Amazon Prime film

=== As dubbing artist ===
Year	Film	Actor	Notes
1982	Nandri, Meendum Varuga	Prathap Pothan	
1982	Oru Vaarisu Uruvaagirathu	Prathap Pothan	

== Television ==
Year	Title	Role	Channel
1997	Nimmathi Ungal Choice	Mouli	Sun TV
2008	Kolangal	Mouli Raj	Sun TV
2008–2009	Kalasam	Lawyer	Sun TV
2010–2015	Nadhaswaram	Chockalingam	Sun TV
2015–2018	Kula Deivam	Sundaram/Arunachalam	Sun TV
2018–2019	Kalyanamam Kalyanam	Sivaprakasam	Vijay TV
2019–2020	Kalyana Veedu	Music Director Manikkavasan	Sun TV
