= Pammal K. Sambandam =

2002 Indian film by T. S. B. K. Moulee

- Theatrical release poster
- Directed by: Moulee
- Screenplay by: Moulee
- Dialogue by: Crazy Mohan
- Produced by: Sujatha; P. L. Thenappan (co-producer)
- Starring: Kamal Haasan; Simran; Abbas; Sneha
- Cinematography: Arthur A. Wilson; S. Saravanan
- Edited by: Kasi Viswanathan
- Music by: Deva
- Production company: Media Dreams
- Release date: 14 January 2002
- Running time: 150 minutes
- Country: India
- Language: Tamil

Pammal K. Sambandam is a 2002 Indian Tamil-language comedy film co-written and directed by Moulee. The film stars Kamal Haasan in the title role alongside Simran, Abbas and Sneha. The film was produced by P. L. Thenappan under Media Dreams, while Deva composed the music.

Pammal K. Sambandam released on 14 January 2002 and became a commercial success. It was later remade in Hindi as Kambakkht Ishq in 2009. The core plot of the film was reported to be based on the 1999 film The Bachelor.

== Plot ==
When a stuntman Pammal Kalyana Sambandham alias P.K.S and a reputed surgeon Dr. Janaki come across each other in Chennai when his younger brother Anand and her best friend Malathi run away from home to get married. They instantly develop a dislike for each other. Both have a low opinion of the opposite gender, and also refuse to believe in the concept of marriage. Sambandham humorously often censors his middle name "Kalyana" as it means "marriage". Janaki hates Sambandham for his uncouth manners and language. She gets Sambandam arrested when he argues with her at the police station over Anand and Malathi's marriage. Sambandham is eventually released on bail.

Anand and Malathi's marriage soon turns rocky as Malathi feels that Anand had lied to her over a job assignment in Australia before they had eloped. On the advice of Janaki, Malathi harasses Anand at every opportunity and makes him do the household work. On hearing about Anand's plight, Sambandham decides to fix the relationship by "hooking up" Anand with a woman named Vanaja in order to make Malathi jealous and a more caring and dutiful wife to Anand. But, unfortunately for Anand, Janaki makes Malathi believe that Anand is cheating on her and forces her to file for divorce.

Meanwhile, Janaki tries to get Sambandham into trouble by barging into a movie shoot involving Sambandham and claiming that he is "involved" in animal cruelty since he is using a bull and a snake as part of the movie. In the chaos which was accidentally created by Janaki as she accidentally throws the snake on to the bull's head, the bull goes mad, the snake gets killed and the bull gores Sambandham in his stomach when he was trying save Janaki from the bull as it was trying to attack her. Janaki performs an emergency surgery on him and saves his life, but during the surgery, her prized possession (a wristwatch gifted to her by her aunt) falls into his stomach, which is detected by the X-Ray. She pretends to become close with Sambandham, with the intention to somehow sedate him and perform the surgery again to retrieve the watch. Sambandham, who is unaware that Janaki's watch is in his stomach due to a mix-up with another patient's X-Ray, mistakes Janaki's romantic overtures to be genuine, and falls in love with her. He also inadvertently foils all her plans to sedate him. Eventually, Sambandham provides another shock to Janaki; they are to be engaged at his grandfather's house. Post the engagement ceremony, Janaki finally manages to sedate Sambandham and retrieve her watch. Following the surgery, Janaki reveals the truth to Sambandham and ends their engagement; leaving Sambandham heartbroken. Sambandham's troubles increase when he realises that his grandfather had signed a legal document which stipulates a time limit for him to get married and get the lodge, or the lodge goes to their Caste's union. When his grandfather finds out the reasons why Janaki cancelled the engagement from Sammandham, he suffers a massive heart attack and dies. Meanwhile, Malathi and Anand manage to reconcile in an elevator emergency and get back together, cancelling their divorce.

Janaki feels guilty over being responsible for Sambandham's grandfather's death. She also finds out that Sambandham had decided to transfer the ownership of the lodge to her and convert it to an orphanage if they had got married, and on this revelation, she realises that she has indeed fallen in love with him. She decides to confess her love to Sambandham, but instead she inadvertently convinces him to marry his relative, a weightlifter Rajeshwari alias Raji. The marriage is set within the next two days, as he would lose the possession of the lodge if he doesn't marry by then. However, it turns out that Raji has no interest in the marriage and is in love with a Malayali boy. In a hilarious climax, Sambandham, Janaki, Anand and Malathi help Raji in eloping with her boyfriend, and Sambandham and Janaki too elope as well. Both couples get married in a police station within the deadline, thus ensuring that the lodge remains under Sambandham's ownership, and he gives it to the orphanage.

== Cast ==
- Kamal Haasan as Pammal Kalyana Sambandam (P.K.S.)
- Simran (voice: Savitha) as Dr. G. Janaki
- Abbas as Anand
- Sneha as Malathi
- Manivannan as Rajeshwari's father
- Ravichandran as Sambandam's uncle
- Ramesh Khanna as Biscuit Kanna
- Vaiyapuri as Dili
- Sriman as Malathi's brother
- Charle as Sambandam's lawyer
- Unnikrishnan Namboothiri as Sambandham's grandfather
- Santhana Bharathi as Sambandam's uncle
- R. S. Shivaji as man from Rajeshwari's side/Lorry Driver
- Bayilvan Ranganathan as Mudhaliyar Sangam member
- Madhan Bob as Srivilliputhur Kulasekara Periyasamy (S.K.P.)
- Yugi Sethu as himself
- T. P. Gajendran as Film director
- Balu Anand as Police Inspector
- Kavithalaya Krishnan as lift operator
- Neelu as V. Neelakantan, Police inspector
- Scissor Manohar as snake owner
- Nellai Siva as Mudhaliyar Sangam member
- Singamuthu as Mudhaliyar Sangam member
- M. N. Rajam
- S. N. Parvathy
- Sukumari as Alaram Mami
- Kalpana as Koorkenchery Mariya Kutty Thomas (K.M.T.)
- Kuyili as Sambandham's relative
- Nithya Ravindran as Rajeshwari's mother
- C. R. Saraswathi as Malathi's mother
- K. S. Jayalakshmi
- Jaya Murali
- Siva Narayana Murthy as Wedding guest
- Bonda Mani as Hospital warden
- Muthukaalai as Wedding guest
- Crazy Mohan as ENT doctor (cameo)

== Production ==
Kamal Haasan initially approached Moulee to make a film for his own production house, but efforts were fruitless. Subsequently, the film was started under P. L. Thenappan in August 2001 and the shoot was complete within three months. The film's invitation card for the launch was shaped in the form of the alphabet "K", which formed a significant theme throughout the film. The card also featured images of Devayani who was later replaced in the film by Sneha. Devayani was removed after she went on honeymoon following her sudden marriage and thus she was unable to fulfil her original schedules. Kamal Haasan's character was a stunt double under Vikram Dharma in the film and the stunt director had used the air-ramp for the first time in a Tamil film. During the making of the film, the significance of the initial "K" was hidden before Kamal Haasan revealed at a press conference two weeks before release that it stood for "Kalyanam" (Marriage), which the lead characters despised. The title was inspired by Pammal Sambandha Mudaliar, who was considered as one of the fathers of Tamil theatre.

== Soundtrack ==
The music was composed by Deva. The song "Kandhasamy Maadasamy", written and sung by Haasan, has his character teasing a friend who is in a troubled marriage. S. Suchitra Lata of The Music Magazine wrote, "Deva, the music director for this production, does a decent job. The song I liked most for its warm listening experience was the Hariharan-Sujatha duet Sakalakalavallavane".

Track listing
No.	Title	Lyrics	Singer(s)	Length
1.	"Endi Sudamani"	Vaali	Anuradha Sriram	3:54
2.	"Kandhasamy Maadasamy"	Kamal Haasan	Kamal Haasan	5:30
3.	"Sakalakala Vallavane"	Kabilan	Hariharan, Sujatha	5:40
4.	"Gadothkaja"	Vaali	Srinivas, Mahalakshmi Iyer	5:38
5.	"Penne Kadhal"	Vaali	KK	4:22
6.	"Dindukallu Poota"	Pa. Vijay	Shankar Mahadevan, Mahalakshmi Iyer	5:06
Total length:				30:10

== Release and reception ==
Pammal K. Sambandam was released on 14 January 2002, Pongal day, and became a major commercial success, easily recovering its investment due to the low budget. The film was dubbed and released in Telugu as Brahmachari the following day.

Malathi Rangarajan of The Hindu claimed that "if Mouli had sustained the humorous strain throughout, PKS would have turned out to be a complete comic treat from start to finish. Why he did not do it remains a riddle." The critic also praised the lead performances and Crazy Mohan's dialogue writing. Rajita of Rediff.com described it as "an average film", stating that the only "real highpoint is 'Crazy' Mohan's dialogues". Visual Dasan of Kalki wrote called the film "above average", saying Deva's music did not help the film in any major way, but Mohan's dialogues and Moulee's direction were the film's saving graces. Malini Mannath of Chennai Online wrote "The director has taken the first half of the film at a racy pace, the characters with their quirks, the resultant confusion, Crazy Mohan's crazy lines (though few and far between) helping to pep-up the proceedings. Then the desperation shows in the forced attempts to generate humour. There are too many characters around and too less happening. And with almost all the characters giving up their individuality and receding from their earlier stand, the movie comes to a dull and expected ending".
