= Crazy Mohan =

Indian actor (1952–2019)

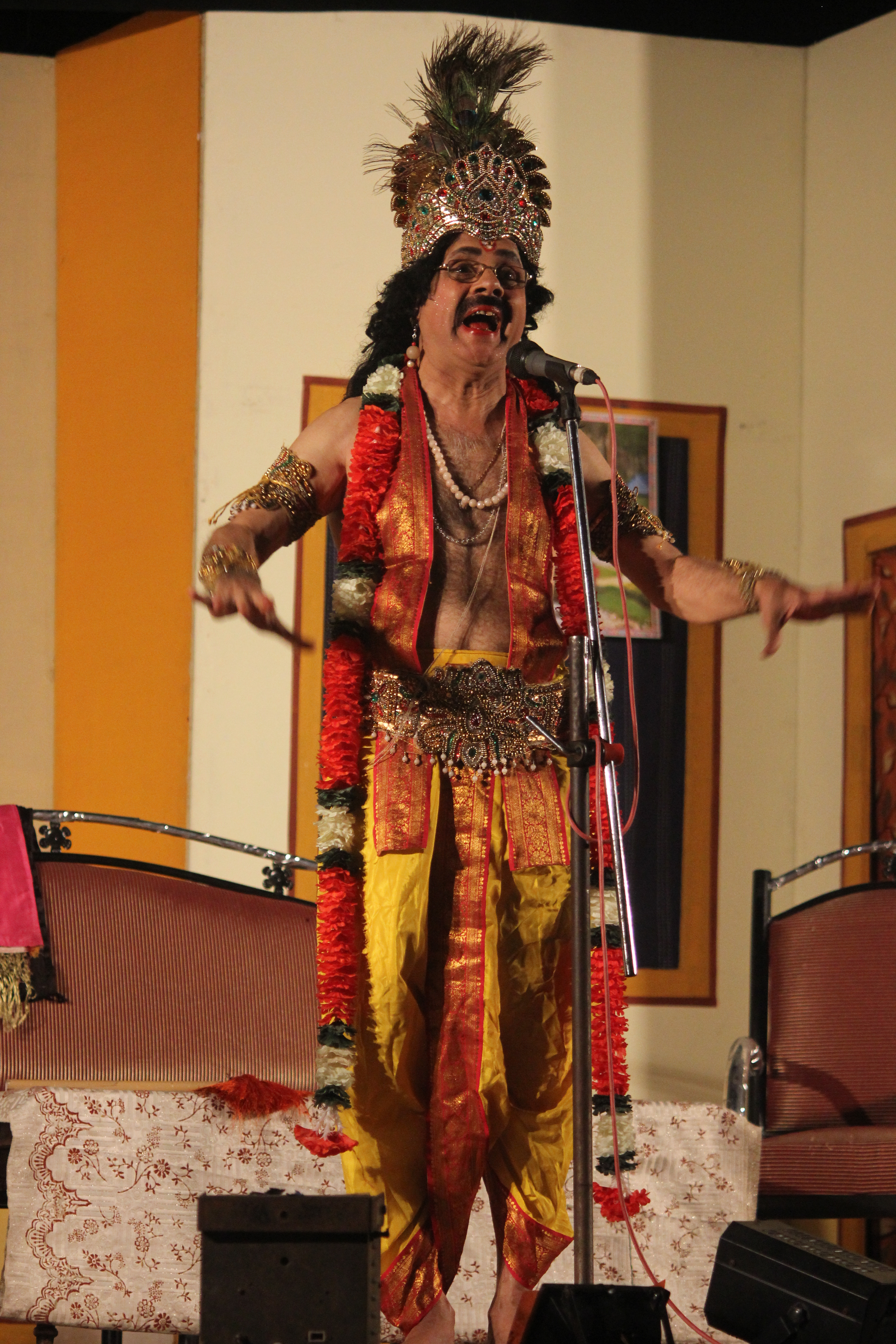
- Mohan in the play Chocolate Krishna, 2015
- Born: Mohan Rangachari; 16 October 1952
- Died: 10 June 2019 (aged 66)
- Occupations: Actor; Comedian; Playwright; Screenwriter
- Years active: 1976–2019
- Spouse: Nalini
- Children: 2
- Family: Maadhu Balaji (brother)

Mohan Rangachari (16 October 1952 – 10 June 2019), known professionally as Crazy Mohan, was an Indian actor, comedian, screenwriter and playwright known for his work in Tamil theatre and cinema. An engineer by profession, Mohan started writing plays and established his drama troupe called "Crazy Creations" in 1979. In addition to dramas and tele-serials, Mohan worked as a dialogue writer for a number of comedy films. Mohan wrote over 30 plays, worked in over 40 films, having cameo roles in each, and written 100 short stories. In 2004, the Tamil Nadu state government awarded him the Kalaimamani title for excellence in the field of arts and literature.

== Career ==
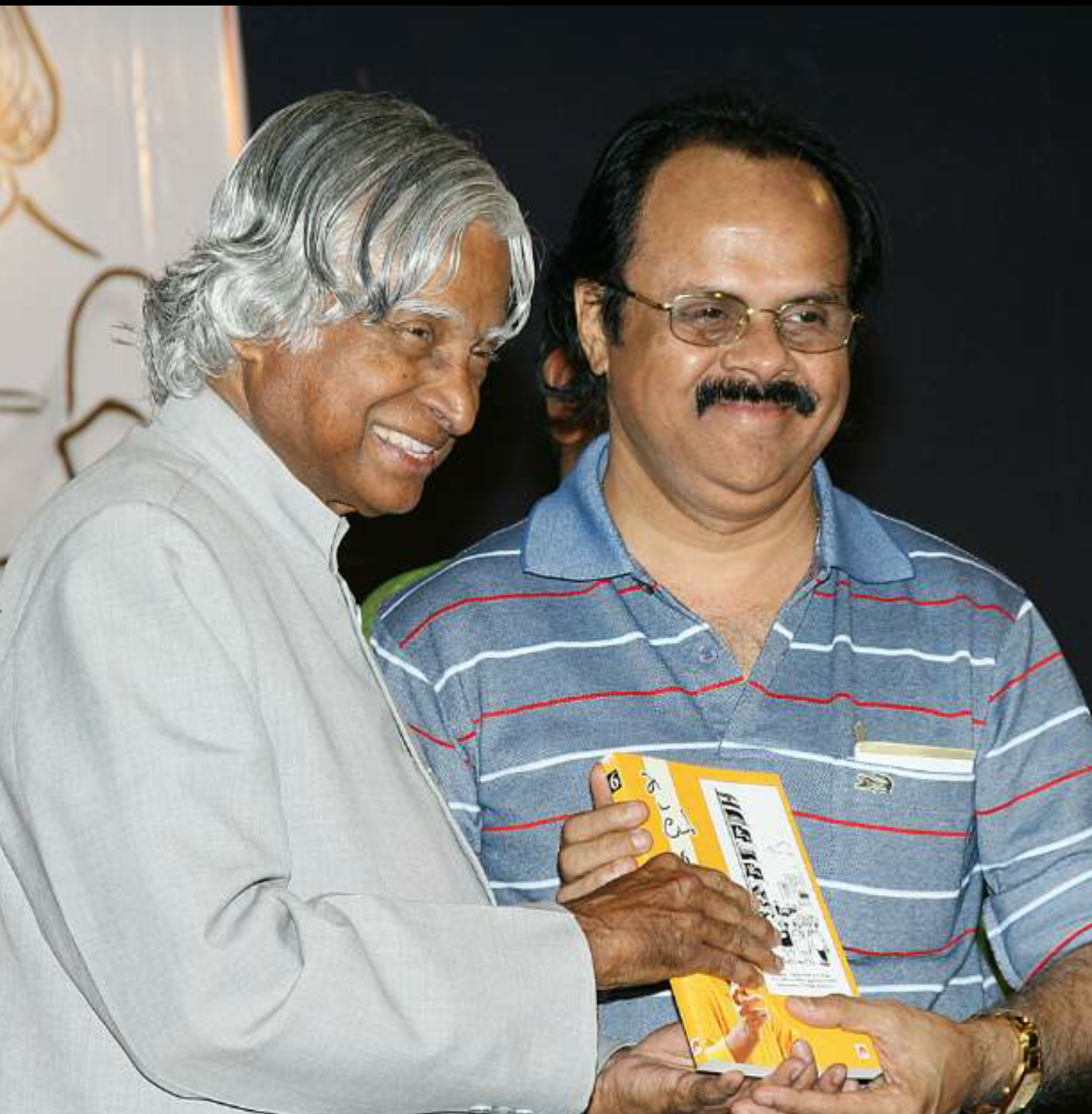
Mohan (right) along with former president A. P. J. Abdul Kalam.

Mohan was a student at the College of Engineering, Guindy, where he graduated as a mechanical engineer in 1973. His guide was his classmate S. Ravi, who was the President of Tamil Mandram. Before becoming a full-time writer, Mohan was working at Sundaram - Clayton Limited.

At the College of Engineering, Guindy, in February 1972, he first wrote Great Bank Robbery, a skit for an intra class contest within the Guindy Engineering college for which he received the Best Writer award. It was followed by scripts for his younger brother Maadhu Balaji's drama troupe at Ramakrishna Mission Vivekananda College, Chennai. The first full-length play he wrote was Crazy Thieves in Paalavakkam for Natakapriya in 1976, which was a runaway hit and gave him the nom de plume "Crazy" Mohan. He also wrote scripts for Tenant Commandments and One More Exorcist.

After writing for other productions, Mohan decided to start his own troupe and founded Crazy Creations in 1979. The troupe has since created over 30 plays with original scripts and staged over 6,500 shows all over India and abroad. His play Chocolate Krishna had been staged 500 times within three years. His brother Maadhu Balaji, who is an actor, plays the hero in all his dramas.

The first feature film he worked on was K. Balachander's Poikkal Kudhirai for which he wrote the dialogues. The film itself was based on Mohan's drama Marriage made in Saloon. He went on to write dialogues for several comedy films, particularly starring Kamal Haasan, which include Sathi Leelavathi, Kaathala Kaathala, Michael Madana Kama Rajan, Apoorva Sagodharargal, Indian, Avvai Shanmughi, Thenali, Panchathanthiram and Vasool Raja MBBS. The 2006 film Jerry had a story and screenplay by Mohan and featured Mohan's entire theatre team, including its director S. B. Khanthan. He has also acted in supporting or cameo roles in the films he wrote the dialogue or script for.

In 1989, he also began producing television comedy series. Serials he produced include Here is Crazy, Kalyanathukku Kalyanam with over 600 episodes and Vidathu Sirippu, with the latter winning the Best Comedy Serial award from Mylapore Academy in 2005. He also wrote 100 short stories.

Mohan was also a distinguished artist who has sketched/painted nearly 60 aesthetic paintings, including portraits of spiritual leaders and eminent personalities, Raja Ravi Verma's portraitures and portraits of Gods and Prophets.

Mohan penned at least one Venba every day—over 40,000 Venbas in his lifetime.

== Awards ==
- Best Dialogue Writer - 14th Cinema Express Awards for Chinna Mapillai
- The Tamil Nadu state government in the year 2004, awarded him the Kalaimamani title for excellence in the field of arts and literature.
- Professional excellence award by Martin O'Malley, the then governor of Maryland, USA, for his outstanding contributions to Tamil literature, fine arts, theatres for more than 38 years.

== Personal life ==
Mohan was married and had two sons.

== Theatrical works ==
Some of his popular dramas as a dialogue writer and actor are listed below.

- Maadhu +2
- Jurassic Baby
- Marriage Made in Saloon
- Meesai Aanaalum Manaivi
- Alaavudeenum 100 Watts Bulbum
- Crazy Kishkintha
- Return of Crazy Thieves
- Oru Babiyin Diary Kurippu
- Kathalikka Maadhu Undu
- Maadhu Mirandal
- Madhil Mel Maadhu
- Chocolate Krishna
- Satellite Saamiyaar
- Crazy Thieves in Paalavaakkam
- Oru Sontha Veedu Vaadagai Veedagirathu
- Ayya Amma Ammamma
- Google Gadothgajan
- Crazy Premier League (CPL)
- Veetai Maatri Katti Paar
- Kalyanam Yematri Panni Paar
- Kudumbam Pirithhu Nadathi Paar

== Filmography ==
=== As a writer ===
Year	Film	Writer	Notes
1983	Poikkal Kudhirai	Story and dialogues	Based on his play Marriage Made in Saloon
1988	Katha Nayagan	Dialogues	Uncredited
1989	Apoorva Sagodharargal	Dialogues	
1990	Michael Madana Kama Rajan	Dialogues	
1990	Unnai Solli Kutramillai	Dialogues	
1990	Indiran Chandiran	Dialogues	
1993	Chinna Mapillai	Dialogues	
1994	Magalir Mattum	Screenplay and dialogues	
1994	Vietnam Colony	Dialogues	
1995	Chinna Vathiyar	Dialogues	
1995	Engirundho Vandhan	Dialogues	
1995	Sathi Leelavathi	Dialogues	
1996	Avvai Shanmugi	Yes	Uncredited
1996	Mr. Romeo	Dialogues	
1997	Arunachalam	Dialogues	
1997	Ratchagan	Dialogues	Uncredited
1997	Thedinen Vanthathu	Screenplay and dialogues	
1997	Aahaa..!	Dialogues	
1998	Kaathala Kaathala	Story and dialogues	
1998	Kangalin Vaarthaigal	Dialogues	
1999	Endrendrum Kadhal	Dialogues	
1999	Poovellam Kettuppar	Dialogues	
2000	Thenali	Dialogues	
2001	Little John	Dialogues	Tamil version only
2002	Panchathanthiram	Dialogues	
2002	Pammal K. Sambandam	Dialogues	
2004	Vasool Raja MBBS	Dialogues	
2006	Idhaya Thirudan	Dialogues	Also screenplay assistant alongside Ramesh Khanna and S. Guhan
2006	Jery	Yes	
2010	Kola Kolaya Mundhirika	Dialogues	
2010	Manmadhan Ambu	Yes	Uncredited
2012	Naan Ee	Dialogues	

=== As an actor ===
Year	Film	Role	Notes
1989	Apoorva Sagodharargal	Car customer	
1989	Indrudu Chandrudu	Mental patient	Telugu film
1990	Michael Madhana Kamarajan	Grocery shop owner	
1990	Jagadeka Veerudu Athiloka Sundari	Kannada speaking tourist	Telugu film
1992	Thambi Pondatti		
1992	Kalikaalam		
1994	Magalir Mattum	Doctor	
1995	Chinna Vathiyar	Doctor	
1996	Indian	Parthasarathy	
1996	Mr. Romeo	Shop manager	
1996	Avvai Shanmughi	Interviewer	
1997	Sishya	Manager	
1997	Thedinen Vanthathu	Bank manager	
1997	Arunachalam	Ayyasamy	
1998	Kaathala Kaathala	Junior Vikadanantha	
1999	Kannodu Kanbathellam	Kalaiselvam	
1999	Endrendrum Kadhal	Astrologer	
2001	Sigamani Ramamani	Sigamani's brother-in-law	
2001	Dost	Astrologer	
2002	Pammal K. Sambandam	ENT Specialist	
2004	Vasool Raja MBBS	Dr. Margabandhu	
2005	Idhaya Thirudan		
2006	Jerry	Rukku	
2008	Sakkarakatti	Librarian	
2010	Kola Kolaya Mundhirika	Deaf Judge	
2012	Naan Ee	Dr. Kameshwara Iyer	
2013	Puthagam	Varadachari	
2013	Kalyana Samayal Saadham	Dr. Kamlesh	Final film role

=== Television ===
Plays

- Beware of Madhu (1987;Doordharshan)
- Aachi International (1997;(Sun TV)
- Here is Crazy
- Maadhu Cheenu
- Nil Gavani Crazy (Sun TV)
- Siri Gama Padhani
- Crazy Times (Vijay TV)
- Vidathu Sirippu (2004; Jaya TV)
- Siri Siri Crazy (2007; Kalaignar TV)

Web series

- Karoline Kamakshi (2019)

== Death ==
Mohan complained of stomach pain and breathlessness in the morning of 10 June 2019. After he suffered a heart attack, Mohan was rushed to Kauvery Hospital by Maadhu Balaji. A team of doctors worked on Mohan to revive him, but within 20 minutes, all efforts to revive him failed, and Mohan was declared dead at around 11:00 AM IST the same day.
