= Vidhi =

Vidhi may refer to:

== Given name ==
- Vidhi Pandya, an Indian actress
- Vidhi Kasliwal, an Indian film director and producer
- Vidhi Sindhwad, an Indian actress

== Surname ==
- Janet Vidhi, an Indian squash player

== Entertainment ==
- Vidhi (1984 film), a 1984 Indian film
- Vidhi (2021 film), a 2021 Indian film
- Vidhi (2023 film), a 2023 Indian film
- Vidhi (TV series), a 2017 Indian TV series
