= Mohan Vaidya (singer) =

Indian Carnatic singer and musician

- Origin: Chennai, Tamil Nadu, India
- Occupations: Singer, actor
- Years active: 1998–present

Mohan Vaidya is a Carnatic singer and musician. He has also worked as a television host and as an actor in Tamil language films and serials like Ramany vs Ramany part 02.

== Career ==
Mohan Vaidhya is the son of noted ghatam artiste K. M. Vaidyanathan and the nephew of music composer G. Ramanathan. He is the elder brother of noted veena player Rajhesh Vaidhya, and his family grew up closely inclined to classical music. Mohan revealed that his voice did not break until his 20s, and that his feminine voice earned him the nickname "Mayil". Mohan learned the violin, taking lessons from Radha Sundaresan. He also took vocal lessons from various gurus such as Tiruvavur Sethuraman, Srirangam Ranganathan, K. C. Thyagarajan and Anayampati Ganesan. Mohan moved to Delhi where he met dancer Saroja Vaidyanathan and began singing for her. He also became the vocalist for Vilasini Natyam exponent Swapna Sundari, Leela Samson, Yamini Krishnamurthy and Bharati Shivaji.

In the early 1990s, Mohan moved to Chennai and hosted Ragam Sangeetham, a Carnatic music based quiz show on Raj TV. Mohan then moved on to work on films, portraying supporting acting roles in films such as Sethu (1999), Parasuram (2003) and Anniyan (2005). He has since continued to be involved in television, notably appearing in television serials and being one of the judges of Sa Re Ga Ma Pa Challenge on Zee Tamil.

=== Bigg Boss ===
In 2019, he was seen as a contestant on Bigg Boss Tamil 3 on Star Vijay. Mohan was subject to controversies as well. He once cited health concerns and swapped the tasks of the toilet with the cleaning duties of the vessel. Host Kamal questioned Mohan about the reasons for the toilet tasks being shuffled. Kamal told Mohan implicitly that no job was superior or inferior to the other.

Mohan was criticized in the social networks for his act of kissing the housemates including female housemates frequently. On one episode, after a drama, Meera Mithun began sobbing uncontrollably, and Mohan went to her and consoled her after some time. He then hugged and kissed the much younger girl. This created a huge controversy on social media. He later clarified to others that she was like a daughter to him. Later during an interview he said that he was always fond of the girls as he was born with three brothers and no sisters and that he genuinely showed affection for them.

== Politics ==
Mohan Vaidya joined the BJP in 2020. Later, he joined the Amma Makkal Munnetra Kazhagam.

== Filmography ==
=== Television ===
Year	Programme / Show	Channel	Language	Notes
1997	Premi	Sun TV	Tamil	
2000-2001	Marmadesam	Sun TV	Tamil	
2001	Ramany vs Ramany Part II	Raj TV	Tamil	Guest appearance
2002-2003	Alaigal	Sun TV	Tamil	
2003-2004	Roja	Jaya TV	Tamil	
2004	Kolangal	Sun TV	Tamil	Guest appearance
2005-2006	Alli Raajiyam	Sun TV	Tamil	
2009-2010	Madhavi	Sun TV	Tamil	
2009-2010	Zee Tamil Sa Re Ga Ma Pa 2009 Challenge	Zee Tamil	Tamil	Reality Singing Competition
2013-2014	Chithiram Pesuthadi	Jaya TV	Tamil	
2015-2016	Bhairavi Aavigalukku Priyamanaval	Sun TV	Tamil	
2019	Bigg Boss Tamil 3	Star Vijay	Tamil	Evicted Day 28
2019	Cooku with Comali season 1	Star Vijay	Tamil	Eliminated week 3
2020	Super Singer Champions of Champions	Star Vijay	Tamil	Reality Singing Competition
2022	Amman	Colors Tamil	Tamil	
2022	Bharathidasan Colony	Star Vijay	Tamil	
2022	Kanne Kalaimaane	Star Vijay	Tamil	
2022	Kana Kaanum Kaalangal	Disney+Hotstar	Tamil	Web series
2022	Ninaithale Inikkum	Zee Tamil	Tamil	Guest appearance
2023	Vaa Tamizha Vaa	Kalaignar TV	Tamil	Reality Talk show
2023	Kannedhirey Thondrinal	Kalaignar TV	Tamil	
2023	Sandhya Raagam	Zee Tamil	Tamil	Guest appearance
2023-2024	Nala Damayanthi	Zee Tamil	Tamil	
2024-2025	Ponni	Star Vijay	Tamil	
2025	Panivizhum Malarvanam	Star Vijay	Tamil	
2025	Ethirneechal Thodargiradhu	Sun TV	Tamil	
2026	Vinodhini	Sun TV	Tamil	
2026	Parijatham	Zee Tamil	Tamil	Guest Appearance

=== Films ===
Year	Film	Role	Notes
1999	Kadhalar Dhinam	Singer on chariot	Guest appearance in the song "Nenaichchapadi"
1999	Sethu	Abitha's uncle	
2000	Aval Paavam		
2002	Seshu	Abithu's uncle	Telugu film
2003	Parasuram		
2004	Machi	Rakshita's father	
2005	Anniyan	Krishnan	
2007	Vegam	Ashwin's father	
2013	Masani	Temple priest	
2022	Kadamaiyai Sei	Building member	
2023	Bagheera	Vedhavalli's father	
2023	Karungaapiyam	Kajal's neighbor	
2023	Rule Number 4	Chinnamalai	
2024	Andhagan	Music store owner	
2025	Mrs & Mr	Hot Uncle	
