= Kanalpoovu =

Indian television series

- Genre: Drama
- Written by: Dr.Praveen Eravankara
- Screenplay by: V. Thiruselvam
- Directed by: T.S.Saji/ Abhi Krishna /ambili devi
- Starring: Vaishnavi; Sandra Babu; ambili devi
- Theme music composer: Jithin K Roshan; Rajeev Alunkal
- Opening theme: "penne nee unarnu vaa"
- Country of origin: India
- Original language: Malayalam
- No. of seasons: 1
- No. of episodes: 812

Production
- Executive producer: Sakshi B Devraj
- Producer: Baiju Devraj
- Production location: Trivandrum
- Cinematography: Prabhu
- Editor: Santhosh Sridhar
- Camera setup: Multi-Camera
- Running time: approx. 22–24 minutes per episode
- Production company: Sandras communication

Original release
- Network: Surya TV
- Release: 24 July 2022 – 27 October 2024

Kanalpoovu was an Indian Malayalam-language drama television series starring Ambili Devi, Kannada actress Vaishnavi (marking her debut), Chilanka and Manve.It aired from 24 July 2022 to 27 October 2024 in Surya TV and digitally streams on Sun NXT. The show is an official remake of critically acclaimed Tamil serial Ethirneechal.

== Cast ==
Lead Cast

- Vaishnavi (epi 1-595) / Sandra Babu (epi 597-812) as Janani (Female Protagonist)
- Yedu Krishnan (Episode 1-650)/ Amal Rajdev (Episode 658-812) as Manikyamangalath Viswanathan (Main Antagonist)
- Sanuraj as Haridas (Male Protagonist)
- Ambili Devi as Kaveri
- Chilanka S. Deedu as Nanditha
- Lekshmi Maya (2022–23)/ Manve Surendran (2023–2024) as Mythili
- Daveed John as Ajayaghosh (Parallel Antagonist)
- Girish Mohan (epi 11- 94) / Naveen Arackal (epi 98-503) / Deva Prasad (epi 503-812) as Chandradas (Second male Protagonist)
- Omana Ouseph as Mahalakshmi amm/achamma
- Kalyani (epi 1-300) / Laksmi (epi 330-812) as Athira
- Manka Mahesh as Manikyamangalath Haimavathi Amma (dead)
- Vishnu Prasad as Raghuraman Chettiyaar

Recurring Cast

- Bimal Joy as Kareem Bhai
- Ananthu Sheeja as Mithun
- Arun Raj as Suneesh Kumar
- Anand Thrissur as Sethumadhavan
- Indulekha as Rukku maami
- Raheena Anas as Sindhu
- Maya Krishnan as Kamalakshi
- Athira Praveen as Srilatha
- Kripa Shekar as Fathima
- Sree Padma as Padmini
- Shriya Surendran as Suchithra
- Poojappura Radhakrishnan as Chandroth Parameshwaran Nair, Kaveri's father
- Bindu murali as Kaveri's mother
- Amrutha Varnan as Charulata
- ___ as Kuttykrishnan
- Shifas as Akash
- Prajusha as Rani
- Tonisha Maheshwari as Kundalatha
- Baby Lakshya
- Subhash Menon as Ananthan
- Hari as Adiseshan
- Sini Prasad as Nanditha's mother
- Anand VH as Adishankaran
- Kishor as Mukundanunni
- Kalyani Nair as Uma Mukundan
- ____ as Ramabhadran
- Smitha Nair as Damayanthi Ramabhadran
- Amboori Jayan
- Neethu Nair as Anjana
- Padma Kumar as Advocate
- Ashwathy Chand

Guest appearance

- Ineya as Ashwathy Mahadevan (Episode 135-138)
- Saniya Iyappan (episode 37)

== Adaptations ==
Language(s)	Title(s)	Original release	Network(s)	Last aired	Notes	Ref.
Tamil	Ethirneechal எதிர்நீச்சல்	7 February 2022	Sun TV	8 June 2024	Original	
Telugu	Uppena ఉప్పెన	4 April 2022	Gemini TV	22 June 2024	Remake	
Malayalam	Kanalpoovu കനല്പ്പൂവ്	24 July 2022	Surya TV	27 October 2024	Remake	
Kannada	Janani ಜನನಿ	15 August 2022	Udaya TV	27 October 2024	Remake	
Bengali	Alor Theekana আলোর ঠিকানা	19 September 2022	Sun Bangla	15 October 2023	Remake	
Marathi	Shabbas Sunbai शाब्बास सूनबाई	14 November 2022	Sun Marathi	15 July 2023	Remake	
