= Priyadharshini =

Singaporean born Indian actress and dancer

- Born: Priyadharshini Neelakandan; June 4, 1976 (age 50); Singapore
- Other names: Priyadharshini Kishore Neelakandan; PD
- Occupations: Actress; dancer; television presenter
- Years active: 1984–1990 (child artist); 1996–present
- Spouse: Ramana Kishore (m. 2002)
- Children: 1
- Relatives: Dhivyadharshini (sister)

Priyadharshini (born 4 June 1976) is a Singaporean–Indian actress, Bharatanatyam dancer, television presenter and child artist who works in Tamil television and film industry. During the 80s, Priyadharshini was a child artist in Tamil films. She is well known for appearing the serials such as Kolangal and Ethirneechal. She also won the second season of the dancing competition show Maanada Mayilada in 2009.

== Biography ==
Priyadharshini was born to K. Neelakandan and N. Srilatha in Singapore. Her younger sister Dhivyadharshini is also a well known television presenter, while her younger brother is an airline pilot.

Priyadharshini started her career as an child artist in the film Dhavanik Kanavugal in 1984. She later went on to play small uncredited child artist roles in other Tamil films such as Idaya Kovil (1985) and the Malayalam film Shubhayathra (1990). From the years 2003 to 2009, she acted in the serial Kolangal which aired on Sun TV. In 2022, she played a lead role in the serial Ethirneechal alongside actors Parvathy Venkitaramanan and Haripriya Isai.

Priyadharshini married Ramana Kishore in 2002, the couple later had a son together in 2004.

== Filmography ==
Film

| Year | Film | Role | Notes |
|---|---|---|---|
| 1984 | Dhavanik Kanavugal | Suchi | |
| 1985 | Idaya Kovil | Saarasu | |
| 1990 | Shubhayathra | Raman's daughter | Malayalam film |
| 1996 | Kalki | Kalki's friend | |
| 2007 | Puli Varudhu | Newsreader | |
| 2010 | Mundhinam Paartheney | Priya | |
| 2019 | Kaalidas | Vidyaa's friend/psychologist | |
| 2026 | Beep | | |

== Television ==
| Year | Title | Role | Channel | Notes |
|---|---|---|---|---|
| 1997–1999 | Ethanai Manithargal | | DD Tamil | |
| 1998 | Vizhudugal | | DD Tamil | |
| 2001 | Visalam | | DD Tamil | |
| 2006–2007 | Kolangal | Vidhya Ramesh | Sun TV | |
| 2004–2007 | My Dear Bootham | | Sun TV | |
| 2004–2007 | Tharkappu Kalai Theeratha | | Kalaignar TV | |
| 2008–2009 | Maanada Mayilada | Contestant | Kalaignar TV | Reality show; Winner |
| 2008–2010 | Rekha IPS | Pavithra | Kalaignar TV | |
| 2009 | Boys vs Girls | Contestant | Star Vijay | Reality show |
| 2011–2012 | Jodi No.1 (season 5) | Host | Star Vijay | Reality show |
| 2014–2017 | Samayal Samayal with Venkatesh Bhat | Host | Star Vijay | Cooking show |
| 2017 | Tamil Kadavul Murugan | Ganga Devi | Star Vijay | |
| 2021–2023 | Namma Veetu Ponnu | Selvi | Star Vijay | |
| 2021 | Bhajan Samraat | Host | Colors Tamil | |
| 2022–2024 | Ethirneechal | Renuka | Sun TV | |
| 2024–present | Ethirneechal Thodargiradhu | Renuka | Sun TV | |
| 2024 | Samayal Express | Guest | Zee Tamil | Cooking show |
| 2025 | Vanakkam Tamizha | Guest | Sun TV | Talk show |
| 2026 | Anda Ka Kasam | Herself | Star Vijay | Reality show |
