= Giri Dwarakish =

Indian actor

- Occupation: Actor
- Years active: 1980–1984 (child actor); 2001–present
- Relatives: Dwarakish (father)

Giri Dwarakish is an Indian actor who works in Kannada and Tamil films and television.

== Career ==
Giri made his lead debut with the Kannada film Majnu (2001) directed by his father Dwarakish, which was a remake of the 1997 Tamil film Love Today. The film faced production problems and was in the making for two years. Regarding his performance, a critic wrote that he "has a long way to go". His next film was the ensemble musical film Rhytham (2003) in which he played one of the heroes alongside Abhishek. He then handled his father's production company, Dwarakish Chitra, and worked on films such as Apthamitra (2004) and Chowka (2017), the latter of which he also played a cameo in.

He went on to play supporting roles in many films and Tamil TV series including Amma I Love You (2018) and Heart Beat (2024), portraying Dr. Ramanathan alias Cinema Doctor in the latter. As of 2024, he starred as a police officer and a motivational speaker in the respective Tamil films Yolo and Made in India, both of which remain unreleased.

== Filmography ==
- Note all films are in Kannada, unless otherwise noted.

Year	Title	Role	Notes
1980	Manku Thimma	School boy	Child artist
1982	Adrushtavantha		Child artist
1984	Police Papanna		Child artist
2001	Majnu	Ganesha	
2003	Rhytham	Sanju	
2003	Hrudayavantha		
2017	Chowka	Seena	
2017	Ivan Thanthiran	Cyber security M. D.	Tamil film
2018	Amma I Love You	Rajesh	
2019	Boomerang	Village officer	Tamil film
2019	Ayushman Bhava		
2021	Roberrt	Bhootayya	
2024	Iravin Kangal		Tamil film

=== Television ===
- Note all television series are in Tamil, unless otherwise noted.

Year	Title	Role	Network	Notes
2005–2009	Kolangal	Giriprakash "Giri"	Sun TV	
2015–2018	Priyamanaval	Vaithieeshwaran "Vaithi"	Sun TV	
2020	Roja	Pichaimuthu	Sun TV	Special appearance
2020	Anbe Vaa	Adiapaatham "Aadi"	Sun TV	
2022–2024	Ethirneechal	Arasu	Sun TV	
2024	Heart Beat	Dr. Ramanathan "Cinema Doctor"	Disney+ Hotstar	Season 1
2025-present	Ethirneechal Thodargiradhu	Arasu	Sun TV	
2026	Resort	Chef John	JioHotstar	
