= Palayathu Amman (TV series) =

- Genre: Devotional drama
- Written by: Mangai Harirajan (writer); A. K.Pandiya (dialogues)
- Screenplay by: Mangai Harirajan
- Directed by: Mangai Harirajan
- Starring: Sanghavi; Kamalesh PK; Haripriya Isai
- Theme music composer: S.P. Poopathy
- Country of origin: India
- Original language: Tamil
- No. of seasons: 1

Production
- Producer: H. Priyatharshni
- Production location: Tamil Nadu
- Cinematography: Ezhil; A. Ramesh
- Editors: Uma Shankar Babu; Selvin; Muthu
- Camera setup: Multi-Camera
- Running time: approx. 22–24 minutes per episode
- Production company: Naren Vision

Original release
- Network: Jaya TV
- Release: 18 May 2026 – present

Palayathu Amman is a 2026 Indian Tamil-language Devotional drama television series written and directed by Mangai Harirajan. Starring Sanghavi, Kamalesh PK and Haripriya Isai, it follows a challenges faced by Abirami, a childless woman who has been married for many years, and many mysterious things happening around her.

The show was produced by H. Priyatharshni under Naren Vision banner. It premiered on Jaya TV on 18 May 2026, and airs from Monday to Thursday at 20:00. It was also shown on Jaya TV and Vision Time Tamil's YouTube channel after it originally aired. This is the first original series to air on Jaya TV after 10 years.

== Cast ==
=== Main ===
- Sanghavi as Abirami
- Kamalesh PK
- Haripriya Isai as Krishnaveni

=== Supporting ===
- Anu Mohan
- C. Ranganathan
- Yaar Kannan
- Thanu Pirasath
- Moumika
- Jayaseela
- Kanga
- Madhisantha
- Hemalatha
- Mahmi
- Kalki
- Suresh
- Yazhini
- Sneha
- Kamali
- Sathya
- Samyutha
- Kalanithy
- Sathyan
- Sarapampu Subrajan
- Umashankar babu

== Production ==
=== Development ===
Palayathu Amman was produced by H. Priyatharshni under Naren Vision banner. The series is written and directed by Mangai Harirajan, known for his series like Thai Veedu (2017-2018). The cinematography was done by Ezhil and A. Ramesh, the editing by Uma Shankar Babu, Selvin, Muthu, and the music by S.P. Poopathy.

=== Casting ===
Actress Sanghavi was cast in the female role Abirami, making her comeback to acting in Tamil serials after 8 years. It is the third collaboration with Jaya TV after Savithri and Kalabhairava, which aired from 2013. Sanghavi has worked with Mangai Harirajan’s series Thai Veedu which had an aired on Vendhar TV 2017 to 2018.

Kamalesh PK played the role of Abirami's husband, Haripriya Isai played the important role. The series also reunited Kamalesh PK and Haripriya Isai, who previously starred together in the Sun TV’s serial Ethirneechal. Actors Anu Mohan, C. Ranganathan and Yaar Kannan are playing supporting roles.
