= Dhavanik Kanavugal =

- Theatrical release poster
- Directed by: K. Bhagyaraj
- Written by: K. Bhagyaraj
- Produced by: K. Bhagyaraj
- Starring: K. Bhagyaraj; Radhika; Sivaji Ganesan
- Cinematography: A. V. Ramakrishnan
- Edited by: A. Selvanathan
- Music by: Ilaiyaraaja
- Production company: Praveena Film Circuit
- Release date: 14 September 1984
- Running time: 148 minutes
- Country: India
- Language: Tamil

Dhavanik Kanavugal (Note: The additional K in "Dhavanik" is not pronounced.) (transl. The Dreams of a Half saree/a Young girl) is a 1984 Indian Tamil-language drama film written, directed and produced by K. Bhagyaraj, starring himself, Radhika and Sivaji Ganesan. The film was released on 14 September 1984. It was partially reshot in Telugu as Ammaayiluu... Preminchandi!.

== Plot ==
Subramaniam "Subramani", an economics graduate from PSG College in Coimbatore, struggles to make ends meet. With five younger sisters to support, he takes on menial jobs to provide for his family. Captain Chidambaram, a retired army officer, owns a cycle shop in the same village and rents a portion of his house to Subramani. Chidambaram is a well-wisher of Subramani's family, and his eldest sister even works part-time at the cycle shop. Subramani's mother arranges for his eldest sister to marry a mute groom, citing the absence of dowry demands. However, Captain Chidambaram intervenes, advising the eldest daughter to wait for a more suitable match rather than settling for an unsatisfactory arrangement.

Subramani gets into a physical altercation with the manager, Vinayaga Moorthy during the personal interview, leading to a court case. Fortunately, Captain Chidambaram comes to his rescue, arguing on his behalf and securing his release. The family's poverty takes a toll on Subramani's fourth sister, who hesitates to inform her family about her puberty, fearing the additional financial burden. Meanwhile, Subramani's cousin, who harbors feelings for him, provides clandestine support. However, her family proposes that Subramani leave his family and live with them, a condition he refuses, ultimately leading to his cousin's marriage to someone else. Unbeknownst to his family with Captain Chidambaram's help, he embarks on a journey to Madras to seek employment opportunities. In Madras, he encounters a young woman who poses as a police officer and convinces him to stay nearby. However, she is later revealed to be the daughter of Chidambaram's friend. Subramani first tries to break into the Tamil film industry as an actor but faces rejection. He then ventures into smuggling, only to meet with failure once again.

Once Subramani saves Chidambaram's friend's daughter from a group of miscreants, she eventually develops feelings for him. However, Subramani does not reciprocate her emotions. To maintain the illusion that Subramani has secured employment, Captain Chidambaram discreetly sends money to his family through money orders, with the help of postman Ponnusami. Chidambaram suffers a heart attack but refuses surgery, opting instead to allocate the funds to support Subramani's family. Meanwhile, the struggling Subramani is found lying unconscious on the street but is rescued by Chidambaram's friend's daughter. She offers him work in the film industry as a junior artist for a daily wage of Rs.25. Captain Chidambaram suffers a second heart attack, prompting him to transfer his properties to Subramani's mother's name. He also makes arrangements to provide a monthly stipend to Subramani's family, making it appear as though the support is coming from Subramani himself. Also, he builds his own grave and expresses his unwavering faith in Subramani's future success.

At the film shoot, Subramani impresses director Bharathiraja with his improvised dialogue, so he appoints Subramani as the film's hero and writer. Subramani's career as an actor takes off, and he achieves great success. On Bharathiraja's sister's advice, Subramani moves into Bharathiraja's house. Meanwhile, Captain Chidambaram, on his deathbed, requests that Subramani not be informed about his condition, asking his family to let Subramani focus on his career. After the film's success, Subramani arranges marriages for his three sisters. He also accepts the love of Chidambaram's friend's daughter. However, during the wedding ceremony, Subramani discovers that his sisters are not interested in marrying the groom Subramani had chosen as they were motivated by money.

Subramani then realizes that his sisters are actually in love with three other men: a tailor, a laundry man, and Postman Ponnusami. These men had helped Subramani during his struggling days and were willing to marry his sisters without demanding any dowry. Subramani wholeheartedly accepts the three men as his brothers-in-law and agrees to their marriages.

== Cast ==
- Bhagyaraj as Subramaniam "Subramani"
- Radhika as Subramani's love interest
- Sivaji Ganesan as Captain Chidambaram
- Ilavarasi as Subramani's cousin
- Poornima Rao as Bharathiraja's sister
- Bharathiraja as himself (guest appearance)
- Rajesh as an actor (special appearance)
- Kuladeivam Rajagopal as a writer
- Radha as an actress (special appearance)
- Urvashi as an actress (special appearance)
- Dubbing Janaki as Maragadhammal
- Kokila as Subramani's eldest sister
- Uma Bharani as Subramani's sister
- Nithya as Subramani's sister
- Babitha as Subramani's sister
- Priyadharshini as Suchi, Subramani's youngest sister
- Ramli as an actor
- Parthiban as Ponnusami, postman
- Bayilvan Ranganathan as a film producer
- Chelladurai as Vinayaga Moorthy, manager
- Haja Sheriff as Kaja, a street-vendor
- C. R. Parthiban as a father of a bridegroom
- Kovai Senthil as a marriage broker
- MLA Thangaraj as Lawyer Mayilsamy
- Mayilsamy as a man in the funeral crowd
- Chitra Lakshmanan as an assistant director

== Production ==
Dhavanik Kanavugal is the first credited role for Parthiban and acting debut for Mayilswamy, both of whom appear in minor roles. It is also the debut of Priyadarshini, who later attained fame as a television actor and host. The song "Sengamalam Sirikkuthu" was shot at Goa.

== Soundtrack ==
The music was composed by Ilaiyaraaja. The song "Sengamalam Sirikkudhu" is set to Lalitha raga. The song "Oru Nayagan" was remixed by Premgi Amaren in Thozha (2008).

Tamil track listing
No.	Title	Lyrics	Singer(s)	Length
1.	"Maamoi Maamoi"	Vairamuthu	S. P. Balasubrahmanyam	3:38
2.	"Oru Nayagan"	Vaali	S. P. Balasubrahmanyam, S. P. Sailaja	5:33
3.	"Sengamalam Sirikuthu"	Kuruvikkarambai Shanmugam	S. P. Balasubrahmanyam, S. Janaki	4:22
4.	"Vaanam Niram"	Muthulingam	S. P. Balasubrahmanyam, S. Janaki	4:14
Total length:				17:47

Telugu track listing
No.	Title	Singer(s)	Length
1.	"Maava Maava Mandukotti"	S. P. Balasubrahmanyam	3:38
2.	"Maa Annaku Eduru Ledura"	S. P. Balasubrahmanyam, S. P. Sailaja	5:33
3.	"Kanepilla Valachenu"	S. P. Balasubrahmanyam, S. P. Sailaja	4:22
4.	"Megham Chiru Jallai"	S. P. Balasubrahmanyam, P. Susheela	4:14
Total length:			17:47

== Reception ==
Jayamanmadhan of Kalki called Bhagyaraj's humour as the film's only saving grace. Balumani of Anna praised the acting, cinematography, music and direction. According to Bhagyaraj, the film failed at the box-office as audiences did not expect a serious subject from him.
