= Kolangal (TV series) =

Indian Tamil-language Television Serial

- Genre: Soap opera
- Created by: Devi Bala
- Screenplay by: V. Thiruselvam; Dialogues; Baskar Sakthi, V.Thiruselvam, V. Srinivasan
- Story by: V. Thiruselvam
- Directed by: V. Thiruselvam
- Creative director: Balasubramaniam Srinivasan
- Starring: Devayani; Deepa Venkat; Ajay Kapoor
- Theme music composer: D. Imman
- Opening theme: "Kolangal Kolangal Azhagana Kolangal"; Harini (Vocals)
- Composers: "Background Music"; D. Imman
- Country of origin: India
- Original language: Tamil
- No. of seasons: 7
- No. of episodes: 1533

Production
- Cinematography: Phillips S. Vijayakumar
- Editors: Sasi K. Basanth; G. V. Rajan; B. Chandru; S. Neilston
- Camera setup: Multi-camera
- Running time: approx. 13–22 minutes
- Production company: Vikatan Televistas

Original release
- Network: Sun TV
- Release: 24 November 2003 – 4 December 2009

Related
- Maayke Se Bandhi Dor

Kolangal (transl. The Patterns) is an Indian Tamil-language soap opera. It aired on Sun TV from 24 November 2003 to 4 December 2009 for 1,533 episodes.

It starred Devayani in the lead role along with Deepa Venkat, V. Thiruselvam, Ajay Kapoor. Other cast included Mohan Sharma, Sathyapriya, Abhishek Shankar, Subhalekha Sudhakar, Nalini, Vanitha Krishnachandran, Srividya Mohan, Manjari Vinodhini, Kuyili, Bombay Gnanam, Dwarakish Giri, Auditor Sridhar, Joker Thulasi, Bharathi, Bharathi Neelima Rani, Devadarshini, Priyadarshini and Dhivyadharshini. It was remade in Hindi as Maayke Se Bandhi Dor, which aired on StarPlus.The show was retelecasted at the same channel from February 9, 2026, at 10:30 AM.

== Plot ==
The story mainly revolves abound Abi and her life which changes due to the people around her. Abi is a hard-working, ambitious woman with strong beliefs, and Aditya is her business rival and half brother. Abi with her mother, Karpagam, maternal uncle, two sisters, Anandhi and Aarthi, and brother, Manohar, leads a healthy life though she tries to keep herself happy because she has had a dark past.

Her father had abandoned her family and married another woman, Kanchana, the mother of Aditya, and has settled as a business tycoon. Abi initially marries Bhaskar but the relationship becomes abusive. Her mother-in-law, Alamelu tortures her constantly. Eventually, Aadhi lures all Abi's close family members and turns all her family members against her.

Abi divorces her husband and starts a new life. She starts a new company but is given competition by her stepbrother Aditya Eeswaramoorthy whom he considers as her as sworn rival. Abi escapes from her brother's tortures and puts an end to his injustice.

In the last scene, Abi with the help of her good friend Tholkappiyan leads a peaceful and hermit life. Abi starts to help an orphanage, thereby ending what she couldn't do to help herself, and wishes to be dear among the orphans even though they are not known to them. She leads a victorious life with the help of 2 friends, Tholkappiyan (Thols) and Usha, Aadhi's wife.

== Cast ==
=== Main ===
- Devayani as Abinaya "Abi": Baskar's ex-wife.
- Ajay Kapoor as Adithya "Aadhi" Eshwaramoorthy: Eshwaramoorthy and Kanchana's first son and Arjun & Anjali's brother
- V. Thiruselvam as Tholkappiyan "Thols" (Dileepan) Abi & Usha's friend and Menaka's brother
- Deepa Venkat as Usha: Abi and Tholkappiyan's best friend/well wisher, Adithya's wife

=== Recurring ===
- Mohan Sharma as Eshwaramoorthy: Karpagam and Kanchana's Husband
- Bharathi as Kanchana Eshwaramoorthy (Aadhi, Arjun and Anjali's mother; Anu's stepmother; Eshwaramoorthy's 2nd wife) (206-1526)
- Sathyapriya as Karpagam Eshwaramoorthy: (Abi, Aarthi, Anandhi and Mano's mother; Eshwaramoorthy's 1st wife) (01-1533)
- Manjari Vinodhini (01-788)(976-1506)/ Supriya (829-922) as Anandhi Karthik (Karpagam's 2nd daughter)
- Damal Shrividya as Aarthi Rajesh (Karpagam's 3rd daughter and Rajesh's wife) (01-1533)
- Abhishek Shankar as Baskar Narayanan: (Abhinaya's ex-husband and Sangeetha's husband, suicides at the end) (02-1530)
- Nalini as Alamelu Narayanan: (Abi's greedy and money-minded ex-mother-in-law. Narayanan's wife. Seetha, Baskar and Vidya's mother) (03-1530)
- Subhalekha Sudhakar as Narayanan (Alamelu's husband. Seetha, Baskar and Vidya's father, a kind-hearted man who always wanted Abi to live with Baskar) (03-601)
- Viji Chandrasekhar as Seethalakshmi "Seetha" Rajaram, Alamelu and Narayanan's eldest daughter. Bhaskar's sister.
- Poornima Indrajith as Dual Role - Meenu alais (Menaka) or Menaka Madhubalakrishnan
  - Menaka - a dynamic American multi-millionaire businesswomen & Tholkappiyan's younger sister who allies with Aadhi to do a satellite project
  - Chellamma - Tholkappiyan and Menaka's mother who dies in Kerala after trying to escape from a rich womanizer

=== Other Cast ===
- Sridharan Gopal (V. G. Sridharan) as Manohar Eshwaramoorthy (Karpagam's son and Anu's husband) (01-1533)
- Nisha Ajay (278-394)/Deepa Narendra (436-1532) as Anu Manohar
- Saratha Viswanath (278-636)/Dhivyadharshini (638-805)/C. Akilandeswari (834-1456) as Anjalidevi "Anjali" Kishore
- Giri Dwarakish as Giriprakash "Giri", Aditya's Personal Assistant cum Supervisor of Aditya Builders
- S.Kavitha as Sangeetha Baskaran, Bhaskar's second wife.
- Kalpanasri as Malayamma alais Shanthi (16-988) (Tholkappiyan's well wisher and Angusamy's wife)
- Mouli as Angusamy (Tholkappiyan's friend)
- Tinku (278-1377)/Franklin (1396-1445) as Arjun Krishna "Arjun" Eshwaramoorthy Kanchana and Eshwaramoorthy's 2nd son (killed by Adhi)
- Neelima Rani as Rekha Arjun (Arjun's Wife; killed by Adhi)
- Bombay Gnanam as Padhmavathi, (Aditya's grandmother; killed by Adhi).
- Shyam Viswanathan as Rajeshkumar "Rajesh" (Aarthi and Sundari's husband; a drunkard)
- Vijaya Raj as Rajendran (Abi's Uncle)
- Vishwa as Karthikeyan "Karthik" Dhandayuthapani (Anandhi's husband and Sujatha's brother)
- Prasanna Ravi (3-59)/Preethi Sanjeev (65-459)/Priyadharshini (487-1299)/Aishwariyaa Bhaskaran (1299-1530) as Vidhya Ramesh
- K. Prabhakar/S. Kamesh Kumar as Ramesh Kumar "Ramesh"
- Ponvannan (8-115) / Balaji as Rajaraman
- Sheela/Geetha Ravishankar as Ambika Gopinath (Usha's mother)
- Devaraj as Gopinath (Usha's father)
- Vanitha Krishnachandran (9-684)/Kuyili as Saratha Thiruvenkadam
- Ramachandran Mahalingam as Thiruvenkadam (09-1533)
- Thozhar. La. Ve. Aadhavan as Thozhar Balakrishnan
- Nagarani as Lakshmi/Kala (Karuna's wife)
- Karnan as Karunakaran "Karuna" (Kala's husband)
- Bhavana (42-104)/ Devadarshini as Sujatha (Karthik's elder sister) (105-464)
- Shathiga as young Meenu (Menaka)
- A. Thamizh Kumaran (512-1070)/Rangadhurai (1343-1452)/Bharathi Kannan as Minister Sankara "Sangu" Pandiyan
- Thilla Subramaniyan as Thillairajan 'Thilla'
- Pooja (117-749)/Sujitha "Suji" as Chandrakala "Chandra" Sathish
- Balaji (9-41)/Dev Anand as Sathishkumar "Sathish" Thiruvenkadam (Abi's cousin)
- Revathi Priya as (Priya) Sumathi Mahesh (Abi's cousin) (09-1533)
- Vijayasarathy as Bharathi (Anandhi's friend)
- Sampathkumaran Sridharan (Auditor Sridhar) as Viswanathan (Abi's boss)
- Joker Thulasi as Krishnan
- Bobby Bedi (554-686)/G. V. Vijesh as Kishore Ganesh Neeraj (Anjali's husband)
- T. S. Raghavendra as Church Father Rafael
- Ziaudeen as Dr. Maheshkumar "Mahesh" (Sumathi's husband)
- K. R. Rangamma as Balakrishnan's mother
- Revathi Shankar/Anjalidevi (photograph) (912)/Revathi Shankar as Maragatham Viswanathan
- Sabitha Anand as Thailambal Thirumalachary, Ganga's mother.
- Rajasekhar as Thirumalachary, Ganga's father
- Keerthana as Uma Ramachandran, Ganga's elder sister
- Chandra Lakshman as Ganga
- Aarthika Shree as Vasuki: Ganga's younger sister
- Srilekha Rajendran as Valli
- Lakshmi Prasanna as Mahesh's Mother
- Shanmugasundari as Rajaram's mother
- Sujatha Panju as Nangai
- Dheena Chandra Dhas as Aarthi's Boss
- Preethi Menon Dayana (Preethi V.) as Thamizhselvi
- Gokul Thilak as Sakthi
- S. T. P. Rosary as Kathir
- Pattukottai Sivanarayana Moorthy as Abi's former house owner
- Birla Bose as Gopinath, sub-inspector/Prabhu, police inspector
- Iniya as Kalaivani
- C. N. Ravi Shankar as Velu Karthik's friend
- Raviraj as Business man (Ganga's part time business boss)
- Ennathe Kannaiah as Kannaiah (Photographer)
- Thideer Kannaiah as a marriage broker
- K. Natraj as Antony
- Kovi. Manisekaran as Dasaiya
- Nesan Nepolean as Raghu (Bhaskar friend)
- Giridhar Thirumalachary (Giridaran) as a psychiatrist
- B.Jayalakshmi as Arundhathi
- Mohan Vaidya as Temple priest (Arundhathi's father)
- Kulothunga Cholan as Kulothunga Cholan (Detective)
- Vanaja as Jaya Chithra (Kulothunga Cholan's assistant)
- Sathish as Vivekanandhan (Kulothunga Cholan's assistant)
- V. Nagarani as V. Nagarani (HOPE Special School Trustee)
- Veera Srinivasan (K. Veera) as doctor (88)/engineer (329 and 423)
- Yugendran as Sivadas
- Oorvambu Lakshmi as Annapoorani (Sivadas's wife)
- Suhasini as Geetha
- Imman Annachi as Anwar
- G. Narendra as Upendra
- Nagalakshmi as Kala, Rajesh's sister-in-law
- Kalaivani as Kalaivani, Office Staff
- Anuradha as Rajamani Kandhasamy, Ganga's boss
- Samson T. Wilson as Ranjan
- V. Ravichandran ("Apollo" Ravi) as Ravi (Menaka's personal assistant)
- Jayashree as Jennifer "Jenni" (Menaka's personal assistant)
- Deepa Shankar as Sundhari Rajesh, Rajesh's second wife, Kala's sister
- K. Thangamani Prabhu as Murali
- Shabnam as Vasundhara Murali
- Sumathi Shree as Manjula
- Sivadhaanu as Muthappa:Office Pune
- Priyanka as Sarasu (Nair's wife)
- Premi as Kala, Aarthi's mother-in-law
- Sneha Nambiar as Ranjani, Bhaskar's ex-fiancé
- K. Narmadha as Chithra (Karthik's younger sister)
- Kamalesh as Shankar
- Gandhimathi as Sundara Vadivu, Narayanan's sister
- Black Pandi as Kannan
- Boby Bilal as Prithvi
- Bhavya Kala as Sandhiya

== Production ==
=== Casting ===
V. Thiruselvam had some casting choices for the female lead, but B. Srinivasan preferred to cast a film artist for the female lead as he had already informed Sun TV.

Actress Soundarya was first approached to do the female lead. Although she was interested, she was unable to join the crew due to her 2-years contract with the Bharatiya Janata Party to support them during election campaign. Then Devayani was suggested for the female lead by the production side to the director to which he had agreed as she would perfectly fit into the character and she was already acting in films. Initially Devayani had some issues over the terms and conditions agreement with the production side, as a result she almost opted out of this series.

As a result of even considering Kousalya to do the female lead from the production side. But, Sathyapriya who was signed to play the mother of the female lead (Abinaya) managed to convince Devayani to play the female lead in this series and sorted out the misunderstanding between her and the production side. Apart from such issues, Devayani was very interested after listening to the script from her husband Rajakumaran to whom the director had already narrated and he had also praised the director. So, she signed to play the female lead Abinaya. Devayani made her acting debut in television with this series. Actress & Dubbing artist Deepa Venkat who is very well known for playing supporting roles in many serials & movies & lead roles in few serials was signed to play the female lead Usha.

Besides Manjari Vinodhini, Abhishek Shankar, Ajay Kapoor, Poornima Indrajith, Chandra Lakshman, Devadarshini, Kalpana Shree, Sathyapriya, Nalini, Mohan Sharma, Subhalekha Sudhakar, Viji Chandrasekhar, Vanitha Krishnachandran, Srilekha Rajendran, Kuyili, Bombay Gnanam, Shanmugasundari, Vijayasarathy, Vishwa, Yugendran, Ponvannan, Giri Dwarakish, Vijayaraj, Auditor Sridhar, Ramachandran, Joker Thulasi, Thozhar. La. Ve. Aadhavan, Sreedharan Gopal, Srividya, Revathi Priya, Pooja, Geetha Ravishankar, Bharathi, Keerthana, Preethi Sanjeev, Zia, Shyam Viswanathan, Devaraj, Deepa Narendra, Tinku, Divyadarshini, Akila, Dev Anand, Neelima Rani, G. V. Vijesh and many other artists were cast and introduced in this series.

Along with writing story, screenplay and directing the series, V. Thiruselvam was also cast as the male lead Tholkappiyan.

=== Filming ===
The series was filmed in Chennai, Kodaikanal, Palani, Thambirankanal, Koranattukarupur, Thiruvidaimarudur, Rameswaram, Thangachimadam, Dhanushkodi, Kolli Malai, Ponkurichi, Tirunelveli, Sundarapandiapuram, Courtallam, Chengalpattu, Walajapet, Yercaud, Tirukoilur, Mamallapuram, Kanchipuram, Porur, Poonamallee, Karayanchavadi, Thiruverkadu, Velappanchavadi, Tambaram, Pallavaram, Covelong, Panaiyur, Avadi, Parangimalai, Kovur, Injambakkam, Nerkundram, Madambakkam, Amarambedu, Sriperumbudur, Thiruperumbudur, Kundrathur, Puducherry, Kochi, Alappuzha, Thiruvananthapuram, Perandoor, Thammanam, Bangalore, Manchanabele, Mysore, Magadi and Bangarupalem in India.

== Awards and nominations ==
Year	Award	Category	Recipient	Role	Result
2005	Pace Awards	Best Television Actress	Devayani	Abinaya	Won
2005	Mylapore Academy Awards	Best Actress	Devayani	Abinaya	Won
2005	Galatta Nakshatra Awards	Best Friend Female	Deepa Venkat	Usha	Won
2005	Film Fans Association Awards	Best TV Serial Supporting Actor	Abhishek Shankar	Baskar	Won
2005	Film Fans Association Awards	Best TV Serial Villain	Ajay Kapoor	Aadhithya	Won
2006	Tamil Nadu State Television Awards	Best Villain Male	Ajay Kapoor	Aadhithya	Won
2006	Tamil Nadu State Television Awards	Best Achiever	V. Thiruselvam	Tholkappiyan	Won
2006	Tamil Nadu State Television Awards	Best Music Director	Kiran		Won
2007	Tamil Nadu State Television Awards	Best Television Serial (First Prize)	Kolangal		Won
2007	Tamil Nadu State Television Awards	Best Actress	Devayani	Abinaya	Won
2007	Tamil Nadu State Television Awards	Best Supporting Actress	Sathyapriya	Karpagam	Won
2008	Vivel Chinna Thirai Awards	Best Screenplay	V. Thiruselvam	Tholkappiyan	Won
2008	Vivel Chinna Thirai Awards	Best Producer	B. Srinivasan		Won
2008	Vivel Chinna Thirai Awards	Best Actress	Devayani	Abinaya	Nominated
2009	Tamil Nadu State Television Awards	Best Story	V. Thiruselvam; P. R. Balasubramanian (Devi Bala)	Tholkappiyan	Won
2010	Sun Kudumbam Awards	Best Supporting Actor	V. Thiruselvam	Tholkappiyan	Won
2010	Sun Kudumbam Awards	Best Supporting Actress	Poornima Indrajith	Menaka/Chellamma	Won
2010	Sun Kudumbam Awards	Best Male Villain	Ajay Kapoor	Aadhithya	Won
2010	Sun Kudumbam Awards	Best Director	V. Thiruselvam	Tholkappiyan	Won
2010	Sun Kudumbam Awards	Best Director (Special Prize)	V. Thiruselvam	Tholkappiyan	Won
2010	Sun Kudumbam Awards	Best Screenwriter	V. Thiruselvam	Tholkappiyan	Won
2010	Sun Kudumbam Awards	Best Actress	Devayani	Abinaya	Nominated
2010	Sun Kudumbam Awards	Best Mother	Sathyapriya	Karpagam	Nominated
2010	Sun Kudumbam Awards	Best Father	Mohan Sharma	Eeswaramoorthy	Nominated
2010	Sun Kudumbam Awards	Best Mother-in-law	Nalini	Alamelu	Nominated

== Reception ==
Kolangal was one of the highest-rated Indian and Tamil soap opera which garnered ratings ranging between 23 and 26 TVR.
