= Avalum Naanum =

2018 Indian Tamil-language soap opera

- Genre: Soap opera Family; Romance; Melodrama
- Written by: Paniveedu Kumaran
- Screenplay by: Paniveedu Kumaran
- Directed by: Dhanush
- Starring: Mounika Devi; Sathyapriya; Amruth; Dharish; Sanjay Saravanan
- Theme music composer: A. JOHNSON
- Country of origin: India
- Original language: Tamil
- No. of episodes: 380

Production
- Editor: Vijay Muthu Krishnan
- Camera setup: Multi-camera
- Running time: approx. 22–24 minutes per episode
- Production company: TRM Sri Barati Associate

Original release
- Network: Vijay TV; Vijay TV HD
- Release: 26 February 2018 – 22 June 2019

Avalum Naanum (transl. Her and Myself; tamil: அவளும் நானும்) is a Tamil-language family soap opera starring Mounika Devi in a dual role opposite Amruth and Dharish, and is directed by Dhanush. It started airing on 26 February 2018 on Vijay TV in an afternoon programming block called "Vijay Matinee Thodargal".

The show is a family melodrama based on twin girls Nila and Diya (both played by Mounika Devi). It ended on 22 June 2019 after a run of more than 300 episodes.

== Synopsis ==
Nila and Diya (Mounika Devi) are identical twin sisters. Nila's parents try to force her to marry Praveen (Amruth) because he comes from a wealthy family even though they know Nila loves Vijay (Shri Mahadev) and wants to focus on her career. On her wedding day, she leaves a note for her father and leaves for Pondicherry to be with Vijay. Diya's father, Sathyamoorthy (Supergood Kannan), forces Diya to pretend to be Nila and marry Praveen for the sake of the family's reputation. After the wedding ceremony is over, Diya's boyfriend Aravind (Dharish) comes as a guest and discovers the twin switch. He tries to help Diya stand up to her parents because she can be a bit of a pushover.

Meanwhile, Nila marries Vijay, but he is killed in a road accident on the wedding day and she becomes a widow. Vijay's relatives, except for her father in law and brother in law, blame her for his death. She tries to return home but her mother Gayathri almost kills her in a fit of rage. Her father Saythamoorthy pretends to disown her to save her from her mother's wrath. Nila returns to Pondicherry with her father in law and earns the love and respect of her in-laws by saving her mother in law's life.

Diya wants to tell the truth and leave Praveen's house but her parents abandon her for some time and then emotionally blackmail her into keeping the secret. Aravind is brainwashed by his sister in law, Kavitha, who is very greedy and believes that Diya has betrayed him for money and consequently plans to get revenge on her. Diya also discovers that Aravind took money from her parents to stay quiet about the twin switch that results in her resenting him as well. During this time, Praveen constantly bothers Diya to accept him and claims to be in love with her even though he knows nothing about her, not even her real name. Diya eventually also falls in love with him. Diya understands Praveen's love for her and she accepts for the first night function where Diya and Praveen are supposed to consummate their marriage. Diya is a girl who believes in the concept of marriage. She even expressed her corroboration for it when she once mentioned it to Manasa stating that whatever wish a woman may have, a woman's life begins only with marriage. She goes on to say that a woman indeed is the one who takes care of the family along with bearing children that ensures the continuity of the family lineage with future generations. Aravind becomes furious after discovering that Diya and Praveen have consummated their marriage

Manasa, Praveen's sister falls in love with Aravind, who pretends to be in love with her so that he can attempt to marry her with the ulterior motives of becoming part of a rich family in order to get an employment at Manasa's father's company. He manipulates the whole family against Diya who tries everything to prove Aravind is a bad guy. Diya tries to stop their engagement by telling the truth about the twin switch to save Manasa from Aravind's trickery but her mother pushes her down the stairs and she falls into a coma. Nila also comes home in this time to try and help Diya stop the Aravind-Manasa engagement. Sathyamurthy and Gayathri emotionally blackmail Nila into pretending to be Praveen's wife until the engagement is over so Diya doesn't lose more respect in the family. After the engagement they learn that the doctor is uncertain if Diya will ever regain her consciousness.

Nila decides to keep up the facade as Praveen's wife until Diya wakes up so that she can stop Aravind and Kavitha's evil plan. Praveen claims to be in love with Nila but he doesn't even know which twin she is and tries to sleep with both of them. He gets very mad that Nila isn't interested in him and gets angry at her whenever she tries to help the rest of the family but not pay attention to him.

Kavitha, Aravind and Manimaaran(the union leader of Praveen's company) come up with a plan to scam the company. Aravind's brother Prabhakhar doesn't like their plan so he tries to expose the truth, but they keep him captive and eventually kill him. They also turn everyone in the family against Nila and she is made to leave the house until Manasa & Aravind's wedding is over. Diya wakes up from the coma and is very mad at Nila for her actions and wants Praveen back even though Praveen doesn't even recognize her as his real wife when she goes to meet him. Eventually Nila proves Kavitha, Aravind and Manimaaran were involved in murdering Prabhakhar, and Kavitha is arrested. Aravind goes to Praveen's house to tell the entire family the truth about the wedding day and twin switch before he also gets arrested. At the same time, Nila and Diya are heading to Praveen's house to tell them about Kavitha's arrest and try to get Diya back in the house as Praveen's wife the fake Nila. Aravind gets arrested because he tries to shoot Praveen but Nila saves Praveen and got shot in the neck. After a sequence of events, Praveen parents engaged Manasa to Vasanth. During Manasa and Vasanth's engagement everyone is aware of the truth concerning Nila and Diya.

Praveen's family is once again angry with Diya's family, and expels Diya from the family. Praveen's mother manipulates Praveen to file a mutual divorce or else would lodge a complaint with the police on the Nila and Diya incident of switching identities. Praveen agrees for a mutual divorce, and Diya simply accepts it. Praveen's mother finds a bride, Sandhya for Praveen once the divorce is finalised. Sandhya meets Diya and asks Diya to be her maid of honour which Diya accepts. Praveen realizes he loves Diya but is unable to express it because of his mother's pressure and persistence to marry Sandhya. Following a series of events, Sandhya and Nila make plans to test Praveen's love for Diya. The divorce was granted for Diya and Praveen. At the wedding, Sandhya says she cannot marry Praveen because Praveen has given his heart to Diya. Sandhya pushes Diya meanwhile Praveen ties the knot. The show ends with Diya saying she is pregnant.

== Cast ==
=== Main ===
- Mounika Devi as Nila Vijay and Diya Praveen (dual role)
- Amruth Kalam as Praveen Rajendran (Diya's husband)
- Dharish as Aravind (Diya's ex-boyfriend, main antagonist)
- Shri Mahadev as Vijay Ravishankar (Nila's husband, died in the serial, Ep: 1-34)

=== Nila's & Diya's family ===
- Supergood Kannan as Sathyamurthy (Nila's, Diya's father)
- Sri Latha as Gayathri Sathyamurthy (Nila's, Diya's mother)

=== Praveen's family ===
- Kiru Baji as Parvathy Rajendran (Praveen's mother)
- Shyam Gopal (Ep: 1-167) and Shridhar (Ep: 168-380) as Rajendran (Praveen's father)
- Reshma Reshu as Swetha (Praveen's elder sister)
- Koushik as Sundeep (Swetha's husband)
- Dharsha Gupta (Ep: 5-124) and Preethi (Ep: 125-185) and Suju Vasan (Ep: 186-266) and Fouziee (Ep: 267-380) as Manasa (Praveen's younger sister)
- Santhosh as Dinesh (Praveen's cousin, Ep: 69-70)

=== Aravind's family ===
- S.Kavitha as Kavitha Prabhakar (Aravind's sister-in-law, antagonist, Ep: 46-308)
- Neelakandan as Prabhakar (Aravind's elder brother, died in the serial, Ep: 46-225)

=== Vijay's family ===
- Sanjay Saravanan as Vasanth Kumar (Vijay's cousin)
- Sathyapriya as Bhanumathi (Vijay's, Vasanth's grandmother)
- Guru Hawkman as Ravishankar (Vijay's father and Nila's father in Law)
- Banu Bharathwaj as Madhavi Ravishankar (Vijay's mother)
- Balasubramani (Ep: 3-158) and Unknown (Ep: 263-380) as Umashankar (Vasanth's father, antagonist)
- Baby Joyce as Mythili Umashankar (Vasanth's mother)

=== Others ===
- Dhivya Sri Rengaraja as Sandhya (Ep: 347-380)
- Moses R Wilky as Manimaaran

== Production ==
Upcoming artist Mounika and Amruth who play the lead roles, are making their Tamil-language debuts with the series. Mounika Devi, who grew up in Andhra Pradesh, found it difficult to speak Tamil for her role. She played dual roles in the series and found it difficult to convincingly play both roles during the same take.

== Controversy ==
Following an issue regarding the trending #MeToo at the time between the director Dhanush and Mounika, the director left the series in February 2019.
