= Kairasi Kudumbam =

- கைராசிக்குடும்பம்
- Genre: Soap opera
- Written by: V.Padmavathy, V.Thiruselvam
- Screenplay by: V.Thiruselvam
- Directed by: V. Thiruselvam
- Starring: Shiva; Subathira; Vithiya; Sri Vidhya; Mohana
- Original language: Tamil
- No. of seasons: 1
- No. of episodes: 686

Production
- Producer: Thiruselvam Theaters
- Editor: G. Daniel Rajadurai
- Camera setup: Multi-camera
- Running time: approx. 20-22 minutes per episode

Original release
- Network: Jaya TV
- Release: 22 April 2015 – 24 November 2017

Kairasi Kudumbam (Tamil: கைராசிக்குடும்பம் transl. 'Lucky Family') is a 2015 IndianTamil-language soap opera that aired on Jaya TV. It was broadcast from 22 April 2015 to 24 November 2017 at 8:30 PM (IST) and ended with 686 Episodes. The show stars Shiva, Subathira, and Vithiya. The show is directed by V. Thiruselvam.

== Cast ==
- Shiva subramanian(eramana rojave) as Sivagnanam
- Subathira as Meenakshi
- Vithiya as Banumadhi
- Mohana as Ashika (Banumathi's friend)
- Bhagyalakshmi as Anandhi
- Srilekha Rajendran as Indirani, Meenakshi and Chitra's mother
- Vijay Krishnaraj as Meenakshi and Chitra's father
- Suresh as Shanmugam
- J.Durai Raj as Saravanan
- Thilla as Veeramani
- Parthan Siva as Sadagopan
- Jeevitha/Priyashree as Vyjayanthi
- Kiruthika as Chitra, Meenakshi's younger sister
- Srividya Natarajan as Santhi, Sivagnanam's younger sister
- Vijayaraj as Vairavan, Santhi's husband
