= Haripriya Isai =

Indian television actress and television presenter

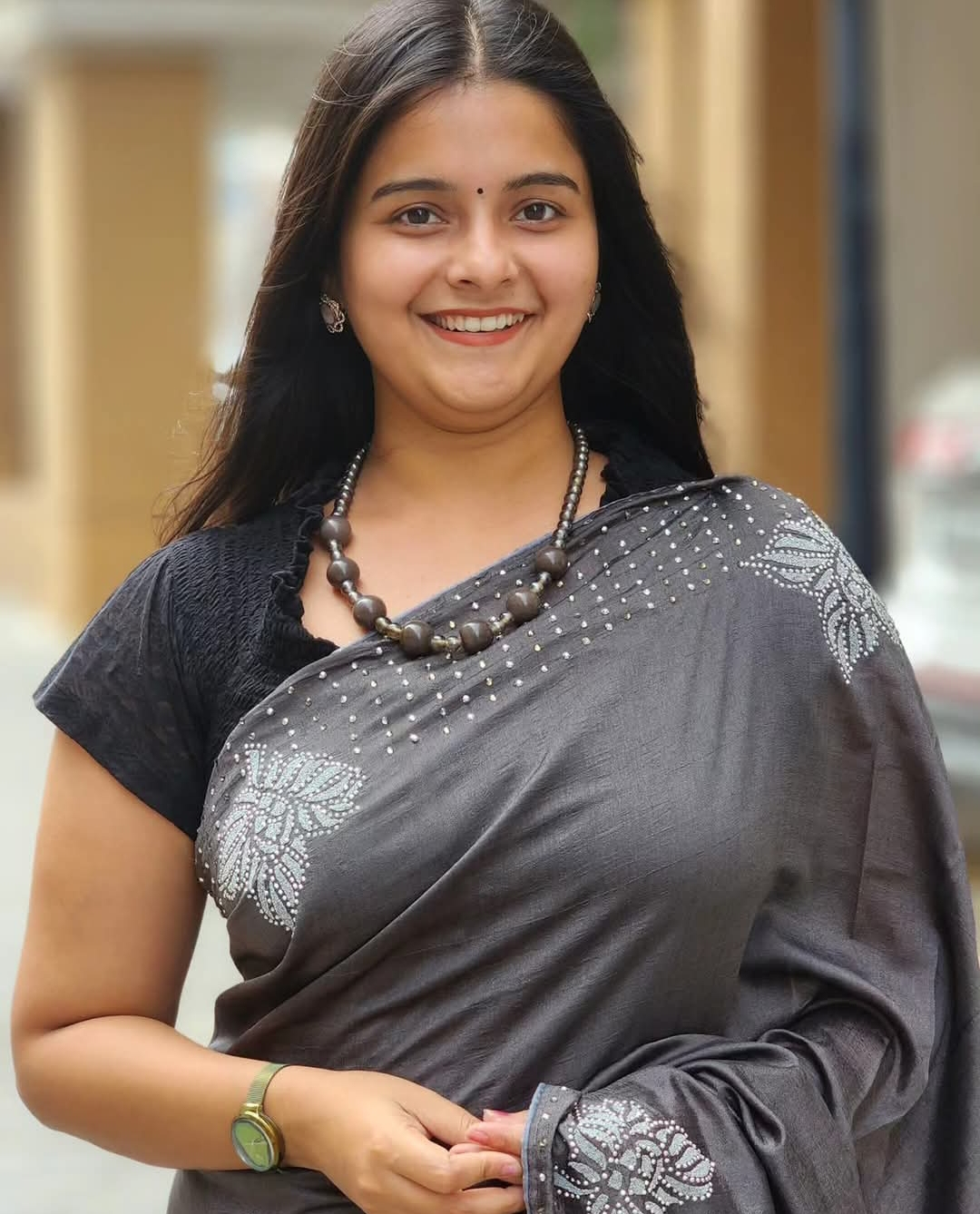
- Born: Haripriya Isai; 5 June 1992 (age 34)
- Other names: Isaipriya, Nandhini, Nakkal Raani
- Occupations: Actress; Television presenter
- Years active: 2011- present
- Known for: Priyamanaval; Ethirneechal
- Children: 1

Haripriya Isai (born 5 June 1992) is an Indian television actress and television presenter, who appears in Tamil launguage TV series. She made her television debut with Kana Kaanum Kaalangal, and later appeared in few television series. She is best known for her role as Nandhini on Ethirneechal.

== Career ==
In 2011, Haripriya started her career in a Tamil serial Kana Kaanum Kaalangal. Later in 2015 she appeared in Lakshmi Vandhachu. In 2016 she cast in Priyamanaval. She then played a negative lead role in 2019 series Kanmani. Later in 2022, Haripriya was cast as the parallel lead role in the Tamil soap opera Ethirneechal.

== Filmography ==
=== Television ===
Year	Serial(s)	Role(s)	Network(s)	Notes	Ref.
2011–2012	Kana Kaanum Kaalangal Kallooriyin Kadhai	Priya	Star Vijay	Debut series	
2012–2013	Merku Mambalathil Oru Kaadhal	Mahi	Zee Tamil		
2015	Mundhanai Mudichu	Anitha	Sun TV		
2015–2017	Lakshmi Vandhachu	Anushka Shakthivel	Zee Tamil		
2016	EMI-Thavanai Murai Vazhkai	Lekha	Sun TV		
2016–2017	Kalyanam Mudhal Kadhal Varai	Anuradha Manoj Kumar	Star Vijay		
2016–2019	Priyamanaval	Isaipriya Prabhakaran	Sun TV		
2017–2018	Vidhi	Mythili	Sun TV		
2018	Saravanan Meenatchi	Raadhika	Star Vijay		
2019–2020	Kanmani	Valarmathi	Sun TV		
2019	Aathma	Anitha	Zee Tamil		
2020	Thanthu Vitten Ennai	Amritha	Zee 5	Webseries	
2021	Senthoora Poove	Swathi	Star Vijay		
2022	Thalattu	Young Sivagami	Sun TV		
2022–2024	Ethirneechal	Nandhini Kathirvel	Sun TV		
2022–2023	Innisaiye	Host	Sun Life	Replaced by VJ Malar	
2024–present	Ethirneechal Thodargiradhu	Nandhini Kathirvel	Sun TV		
2025	Roja 2	Manimeghalai	Saregama TV Shows Tamil	Webseries	
2026 – present	Palayathu Amman	Krishnaveni	Jaya Tv		

=== Films ===
Year	Title	Role(s)	Notes
2021	Imaigal Sinthiya Oru Parvai	Nila	Short film
2022	Etharkkum Thunindhavan	Village girl	Film debut; Guest appearance
2022	Enna Solla Pogirai	Deepika	
2023	Karungaapiyam	Red saree girl	Guest appearance
2025	Varunan	Agni	
2025	Blackmail		
2026	Appa Kutty	Megala	

== Awards & nominations ==
Year	Serial	Award	Category	Result	Ref.
2023	Ethirneechal	Behindwoods Gold Icons	Best Lead Cast On Television	Won	
2023	Ethirneechal	Sun Kudumbam Viruthugal	Thanga Mangai	Won	
2024	Ethirneechal	Ananda Vikatan Television Awards	Best Comedian – Female	Won	
2025	Ethirneechal	Sun Kudumbam Viruthugal	Thanga Mangai	Won	
2025	Ethirneechal	SS Music Super Women Awards	Unstoppable Women – Television	Won	
2025	Ethirneechal	Blacksheep Tele Awards	Favourite Supporting Actress	Nominated	
2025	Ethirneechal	Blacksheep Tele Awards	Favourite Comedian – Female	Nominated	
2025	Ethirneechal	Ananda Vikatan Television Awards	Best Comedian – Female	Nominated	
