= Iravin Kangal =

- Directed by: Pop Suresh
- Written by: Balasubramani KG
- Produced by: Prathab
- Starring: Pop Suresh; Dolly Aishu
- Cinematography: Gita Karan
- Edited by: Imam
- Music by: Charles Dhana
- Production company: Prathab Enterprises
- Distributed by: Uthraa Productions
- Release date: 5 April 2024
- Country: India
- Language: Tamil

Iravin Kangal is 2024 Indian Tamil-language science fiction thriller film written and directed by Pop Suresh. The film stars Pop Suresh and Dolly Aishu. The film was produced by Prathab under the banner of Prathab Enterprises.

== Cast ==
- Pop Suresh as Victor
- Dolly Aishu
- Giri Dwarakish
- Selvakanthan
- Azhagu Raja
- Dharun

== Production ==
The film noted debuted to the director Pop Suresh

== Reception ==
Maalai Malar critic wrote that Pop Suresh, who plays the lead role of Victor, carries the entire film on his shoulders.

Dinakaran critic gave a mixed review.
