= Bombay Gnanam =

Indian actress

Gnanam Balasubramanian
- Other name: Bombay Gnanam
- Occupations: Television and film actor

Gnanam Balasubramanian, popularly known as Bombay Gnanam, is an Indian actress who appears in Tamil stage, television and film productions. She started her acting career as a stage artist in 1989 when she founded the Mahalakshmi Ladies Drama Group.

== Career ==
She has acted in over 50 Tamil television serials including Premi, Kolangal and Chidhambara Ragasiyam, Sahana, Ethirneechal and Ethirneechal Thodargiradhu (second season of it). She was awarded Kalaimamani in 2005.

=== Filmography ===
- Avvai Shanmugi (1996)
- Aahaa..! (1997)
- Yai! Nee Romba Azhaga Irukke! (2002)
- Nala Damayanthi (2003)
- Oru Naal Oru Kanavu (2005)
- Veyil (2006)
- Azhagiya Tamil Magan (2007)
- Jigarthanda (2014)
- Endaro Mahavanubhavalu - 2018 (Also director)
