= Priyamaana Thozhi (TV series) =

Indian television series

- Genre: Drama
- Written by: S.Parvin Banu
- Screenplay by: Dialogues; J.Deepa
- Directed by: K.Shiva (1–34); O.N.Rathnam (35–597)
- Starring: Sandra Babu; Vicky Roshan
- Theme music composer: N.R.Raghu Nandhan
- Opening theme: "Aayiram Aayiram"; Namitha Babu (Vocals); Pa.Vijay (Lyrics)
- Country of origin: India
- Original language: Tamil
- No. of seasons: 1
- No. of episodes: 604

Production
- Producer: Madhumalar Gurubaranm
- Cinematography: K.Anandraj
- Editors: Muralikrishnan; Raghu; Deepankar Barik
- Camera setup: Multi-camera
- Running time: approx. 20–22 minutes per episode
- Production companies: Sun Entertainment; VSAGA Pictures Pvt Ltd

Original release
- Network: Sun TV
- Release: 30 May 2022 – 5 May 2024

Priyamana Thozhi (transl. Lovable Female Friend) is a 2022–2024 Indian Tamil-language television series, starring Sandra Babu and Vicky Roshan in lead roles. It premiered on 30 May 2022, replacing Chithi 2 and airing on Sun TV from Monday to Saturday and ended with 604 episodes on 5 May 2024 and was replaced by Punnagai Poove serial. It is also available on the digital platform Sun NXT.

== Cast ==
=== Main ===
- Vicky Roshan as Aadhityakumar alias Aadhi: Damodharan's younger son; Aravindkumar and Keerthi's brother; Sanghavi's ex-fiancé; Pavithra's best friend and second husband (2022–2024)
- Sandra Babu as Pavithra Aravindkumar& Aadhityakumar: Aravindkumar widow; Aadhityakumar best friend and wife. (2022–2024)
- VJ Kaushik Gabriell as Aravindkumar alias Aravind: Damodharan's elder son; Aadhityakumar and Keerthi's elder brother; Pavithra's first husband (2022) (dead)
- Deepthi Rajendra as Sanghavi Arvind: Rajasekar's daughter; Aadhityakumar's ex-fiancé; Pavithra's arch-rival turned friend(post memory loss), Dr. Arvind wife (2022–2024)

=== Recurring ===
- Vanaja Bharath Kumar as Seetha (Seethamma): Aravindkumar, Aadhityakumar and Keerthi's aunt; Damodharan's sister (2022–2024)
- Bhaskar as Damodharan: Janaki's widower; Aravindkumar, Aadhityakumar and Keerthi's father; Rajasekar's friend (2022–2024)
- Balasubramani as Rajasekar: Sanghavi's father; Aadhityakumar and Pavithra's arch-rival; Damodharan's friend (2022–2024)
- Bindhu Pankaj as Radha: Sanghavi's mother (2022–2024)
- Kathadi Ramamurthy as Sundaram: Pavithra's grandfather (2022–2024)
- Mohammed Absar as Dr. Aravind (Sangavi's husband) (2023–2024)
- Sumathi Sree as Maraghatham: Pavithra's grandmother (2022–2024)
- Anjali Baskar → Kavya Shanmugam as Keerthi: Damodharan's daughter; Aravindkumar and Aadhityakumar sister; Manohar's cousin and wife (2022–2024)
- SK Karthick as Manohar alias Mano: Keerthi's cousin and husband (2022–2024)
- Deepa Babu as Vasuki: Mano's mother (2022–2024)
- Ganesh as Bhoopathy: Mano's father; Janaki's younger brother (2022–2024)
- VJ Malar as Vidhya: Pavithra's PA (2023–present)
- Krithika Annamalai as Inspector Nandhini: Aravindkumar classmate (2023–2024)
- Unknown as Maheshwari: Pavithra and Aadhityakumar helper (2023–2024)
- Vincent Roy as Sivasu: Deva's father; Pavithra's uncle (2022–2024)
- Geetha Saraswathi as Kamakshi: Sivasu's wife; Deva's mother (2022–2023)
- Barath Guru as Devarajan alias Deva: Pavithra's cousin; Shailu's father (2022–2023)
- Baby Dechina as Shailu: Deva's daughter (2022–2023)
- Chelladurai as Murugesan
- Rajasekar's henchmen; Maheshwari's husband (2022) (dead)
- Uma Rani as Janaki: Damodharan's wife; Aravindkumar, Aadhityakumar and Keerthi's mother (dead, photographic appearance)

=== Special appearances ===
- Gabrilla Sellus as Sundari (2022) (Pavithra and Aravindkumar marriage reception)
- Sriranjani as Shenbagam (2022) (Pavithra and Aravindkumar marriage reception)
- Shruthi Raj as Isaipriya (2022) (Pavithra and Aravindkumar marriage reception)
- Nithya Ravindran as Periyyayi (2023)

== Production ==
=== Casting ===
Malayalam Television actress Sandra Babu was cast in the female lead role as Pavithra. Vicky Roshan was selected to play the male lead as Aadhityakumar, making his first debut in male lead role. Kaushik Gabriell was cast in the parallel lead role as Aravindkumar.

Deepthi Rajendra was selected as the Negative lead as Sanghavi. While, Vanaja Bharath kumar, Kathadi Ramamurthy, Sumathi, Bindhu, Baskar, VJ Malar, Balasubramani, Deepa Babu and Anjali Baskar were also selected for supporting roles

=== Airing time ===
This serial was aired at 1:00 PM through Monday to Saturday. Particularly, The Climax episode was aired at 2:00 PM as One Hour Sunday Special on 5 May 2024.

== Soundtrack ==
Track list
No.	Title	Lyrics	Music	Artist	Length
1.	"Aayiram Aayiram ஆயிரம் ஆயிரம்"	Pa.Vijay	N. R Raghu Nandhan	Namitha Babu	3:00
