= Sandra Babu =

Indian actress

- Born: 4 January 2000 (age 26); Kasargod, Kerala, India
- Occupation: Actress
- Years active: 2018–present

Sandra Babu is an Indian television actress who primarily works in Malayalam and Tamil television serials.

== Television ==
Year	Show	Role	Channel	Language	Notes	Ref.
2018	Makkal	Devika	Mazhavil Manorama	Malayalam		
2019–2020	Tamil Selvi	Tamil Selvi	Sun TV	Tamil		
2019–2020	Chocolate	Shyamili	Surya TV	Malayalam		
2021–2023	Thoovalsparsham	Malavika Nandini / Thumbi	Asianet	Malayalam		
2022	Mounaragam	Thumbi	Asianet	Malayalam	Cameo Appearance	
2022–2024	Priyamaana Thozhi	Pavithra	Sun TV	Tamil		
2023	Ninnishtam Ennishtam	Anjali	Surya TV	Malayalam		
2024	Kanalpoovu	Janani	Surya TV	Malayalam		
2025–present	Durga	Durga	Zee Keralam	Malayalam		
