= Uppena (TV series) =

Soap opera

- Genre: Drama; Family
- Written by: Dialogues; Venkateshbabu M
- Directed by: Ramu Kona (1-16); Bachali Siva (17 - 688)
- Starring: Soniya Suresh; Sheela Singh; Swetha; Vijaya Kotla
- Opening theme: "Aa Uppenai" vocals Usha
- Country of origin: India
- Original language: Telugu
- No. of seasons: 1
- No. of episodes: 688

Production
- Producer: Ashajyothi Gogineni
- Cinematography: Adimalla Sanjeev(1-16); Rajarao Vallam
- Editor: Subbu Polisetty
- Camera setup: Multi-camera
- Running time: 20-22 minutes
- Production company: EG Creations

Original release
- Network: Gemini TV
- Release: 4 April 2022 – 22 June 2024

Uppena is an Indian Telugu language soap opera premiered on 4 April 2022 airing on Gemini TV every Monday to Saturday and ended on 22 June 2024. It is available for worldwide streaming on Sun NXT. The show stars Soniya Suresh, Sheela Singh, Swetha and Vijaya Kotla in leading roles. The serial is the official remake of Tamil critically acclaimed television series Ethirneechal which was aired on Sun TV.

== Plot ==
Chakravarthy and Parvati left their family as they married against their parents wishes. They were supported by Parvathi's brother. Janani was born and always lived under her father Chakravarthy's shadow. Janani met her best friend Gowtham in the college though her father didn’t like. Due to events, Gowtham left college makes Janani to feel depressed. She overcomes everything and became a topper. She lives with a sister Anjana and her cousins.

Gogineni Sivaram who is a business tycoon from Vijayawada came for a wedding proposal to Janani for his brother Abhiram. Initially Janani is not willing to marry, but later accepted after knowing Abhi’s innocence. All the in-laws of Gogineni's family are well educated but treated as housewives in the house. Janani doesn’t know the truth of the Gogineni brothers and Janani thinks Saraswathi, Gayathri and Vidya work in offices.

All brothers except Abhiram are misogynistic and abusive their wives. Their children and their sister Roopa also disrespected them. Despite warnings from Vasu and respective in-laws' parents, Janani married Abhiram. Sivaram assured a MD post for Janani for the new company. Finally Janani realises the true reality and Abhiram comforts her.

== Cast ==
=== Main ===
- Soniya Suresh as Janani, Abhiram's wife
- Sheela Singh as Saraswathi, Sivaram's wife
- Swetha as Gayathri, Raghuram's wife
- Madhu Krishnan / Vijaya Kotla as Vidya, Kalyanram's wife

=== Supporting cast ===
- Nanda Kishore as Gogineni Sivaram
- Sujith Gowda / Kalyan as Abhiram, Sivaram's youngest brother and Janani's husband
- Suresh as Raghuram, Sivaram's younger brother
- Chakravarthy as Kalyanram, Sivaram's younger brother
- Mounika / Aadya as Roopa, Sivaram, Raghuram and Kalyanram's sister
- Deepika as Bhanumathi, Sivaram, Raghuram, Kalyanram and Abhiram's mother
- Yarlagadda Sailaja / Fathima Babu as Ghattamaneni Visalakshi: Sivaram, Raghuram, Kalyanram and Abhiram's grandmother
- Mythili Raju as Vasu, Janani's cousin
- Baby Shravya as Aishwarya, Sivaram's daughter
- Baby Geethika as Apoorva, Raghuram's daughter
- Baby Gowthami as Ikyatha, Kalyanram's daughter
- Raj Kumar as Chakravarthy, Janani's father
- Jyothi Kiran as Parvathi, Janani's mother
- Lohith as Vishwanath, Janani's uncle
- Lavanya as Janani's aunt
- Sanyu / Gaurav Varma as Gowtham, Janani's friend
- Visweswara Rao as Saraswathi's father
- J L Srinivas as SKR, Sivaram's business rival
- Sailatha as Charulatha, SKR's wife
- Karthik Prasad as Bhargav, SKR's younger brother
- Javali as Anjana, Janani's sister
- Charan as Suraj, Janani's cousin
- Veerababu as Vinod, Roopa's fiancée
- Navya as Dharani, Abhiram's ex-fiancée
- Jyothi Swaroopa as Rani, Gogineni family house maid
- K S Raju as Panakalu, Sivaram's sidekick

== Adaptations ==
| Language | Title | Original release | Network(s) | Last aired | Notes | Ref. |
|---|---|---|---|---|---|---|
| Tamil | Ethirneechal எதிர்நீச்சல் | 7 February 2022 | Sun TV | 8 June 2024 | Original | |
| Telugu | Uppena ಜನನಿ | 4 April 2022 | Gemini TV | 22 June 2024 | Remake | |
| Malayalam | Kanalpoovu കനൽപ്പൂവ് | 24 July 2022 | Surya TV | 27 October 2024 | Remake | |
| Kannada | Janani ಜನನಿ | 15 August 2022 | Udaya TV | 27 October 2024 | Remake | |
| Bengali | Alor Theekana আলোর ঠিকানা | 19 September 2022 | Sun Bangla | 15 October 2023 | Remake | |
| Marathi | Shabbas Sunbai शाब्बास सूनबाई | 14 November 2022 | Sun Marathi | 15 July 2023 | Remake | |
