= Chithiram Pesuthadi (2013 TV series) =

Indian Tamil-language soap opera

- Genre: Soap opera
- Written by: V. Thiruselvam
- Screenplay by: V. Thiruselvam
- Directed by: V. Thiruselvam
- Starring: Rathi; Priyanka; Vidhiya; V. Thiruselvam; Sathyapriya
- Theme music composer: Navneeth Sundar
- Opening theme: "kuk Kuk Kudaram Ondril"; Shweta Mohan (Vocals)
- Country of origin: India
- Original language: Tamil
- No. of seasons: 1
- No. of episodes: 217

Production
- Producer: V. Thiruselvam
- Camera setup: Multi-camera
- Running time: approx. 26-28 minutes per episode (Monday to Friday)
- Production company: Thiruselvam Theatres

Original release
- Network: Jaya TV
- Release: 9 December 2013 – 17 October 2014

Chitiram Pesuthadi is an Indian Tamil-language soap opera that aired Monday through Friday on Jaya TV from 9 December 2013 to 17 October 2014 for 217 episodes.

The show starred Rathi, Priyanka, Vidhiya, V. Thiruselvam and Sathyapriya among others. It was produced, Written and director by V. Thiruselvam.

== Cast ==
=== Main cast ===
- Rathi (Epi:1-92) / Priyanka (Epi: 93-217) as Thenmozhi
- Vidhiya as Yazhini
- Hansika
- Ramya as Kunthavi
- V. Thiruselvam as Arunmozhi
- Pooja as Thamayanthi
- Sridevi as Manimehalai

=== Additional cast ===
- Sathyapriya
- Vijay Kirushnaraj
- Bharathy
- Mohan Vaidhya as Tamizhvaanan
- Piraksh Rajan
- Sharavan as Moorthy
- Pavakal
- Ramesh
- Giri
- Karpakam
