= Rule Number 4 =

- Release poster
- Directed by: Bosser Elvin
- Written by: Bosser Elvin
- Produced by: Simy Z
- Starring: Pratheesh Krishna; Shree Gopika; Mohan Vaidya
- Cinematography: David Jan
- Edited by: S. P. Ahamed
- Music by: Kevin D`Costa
- Production company: YSIMY Production
- Distributed by: Action Reaction Jenish
- Release date: 3 November 2023
- Country: India
- Language: Tamil

Rule Number 4 is a 2023 Indian Tamil-language film written and directed by Bosser Elvin. The film stars Pratheesh Krishna and Shree Gopika in the lead roles, with Mohan Vaidya and Jeeva Ravi among others in supporting roles. The film was produced by Simy Z under the banner of YSIMY Productions.

== Cast ==
- Pratheesh Krishna as Tamizh
- Shree Gopika as Kavitha
- Mohan Vaidya as Chinnamalai
- Jeeva Ravi as Ravi
- Kala Kalyani as a bank employee
- Birla Bose
- Kala Pradeep

== Production ==
Production on the film began in early 2020, with the film being produced by Simy Z under the banner of YSIMY Productions. Prathessh Krishna, the film's producer, also starred in the lead role alongside Shree Gopika, wo had earlier appeared in Nonsense (2018) and 90ML (2019) The cinematography was done by David Jan, while editing was handled by S P Ahamed.

== Reception ==
Dina Thanthi's critic stated that "Pratheesh Krishna is enjoying the character of falling in love and chasing his girlfriend.". A critic from Maalai Malar wrote that "Pratheesh Krishna, who plays the hero of the story, has given a natural performance."
