= Madhavi (TV series) =

- Genre: Soap opera
- Written by: V. Thiruselvam
- Screenplay by: V. Thiruselvam
- Directed by: V. Thiruselvam; S.N.Shakthivel
- Starring: Sara; Vanitha Krishnachandran; Seenu; Bhavana; Nalini; Subhalekha Sudhakar; Vandhana
- Theme music composer: Navneeth Sundar
- Opening theme: "Kadhal Oru Mayama"; Divya Ramani (Vocal); Aandal Priyadharsini (Lyrics)
- Composer: Navneeth Sundar
- Country of origin: India
- Original language: Tamil
- No. of episodes: 482

Production
- Producers: Sujatha Vijakumar; Vijakumar
- Cinematography: C. Denisten; B.Thiyagarajan
- Editor: D. Preamkumar
- Running time: approx. 20-22 minutes per episode
- Production company: Home Movie Makers

Original release
- Network: Sun TV
- Release: 21 December 2009 – 11 November 2011

Madhavi (Tamil: மாதவி) is a 2009 Indian Tamil-language soap opera starring Sara, Seenu, Bhavana, Nalini, Subhalekha Sudhakar and Vandhana and Vanitha Krishnachandran that aired on Sun TV for 487 episodes.

It was produced by Home Media and written and directed by V. Thiruselvam. It also aired in Sri Lanka Tamil Channel on Vasantham TV.

== Plot ==
The story of a young woman who is good in singing and wants to become a singer. She awaits an opportunity, saying that she is struggling as a chorus singer in the film industry due to her financial situation. Her dream is to see (Seenu) Manohar (her fiancé) pass the civil service examination to get out of all her financial troubles. Manohar is also jobless and penniless during his preparation for the exams and he completely depends on (Sara) Madhavi's money for his family's sustenance.

After a long struggle and preparations, Manohar succeeds in his dream clearing the civil service examination finally. After this, Madhavi ends up facing only with the trouble. When Manohar leaves for his training in different location, Manohar's family flung into crisis. His uncle, an opportunist tries to utilize this situation and decides to marry his daughter to Manohar. Thereby abducting Madhavi and intending to kill her.

== Cast ==
=== Main ===
- Sara as Madhavi
- Seenu as Manohar
- Bhavana

=== Recurring ===
- Nalini as Devaki
- Subhalekha Sudhakar as Madhavi’s father
- K. Natraj as Vazhavanthan
- Devipriya as Easwari
- Surekha
- Vandhana
- Sonia
- Mohan Vaidya
- T.R. Balu
- Puvana
- Kavitha Ayyer as Bhuvana
- Ramya
- Vanidha
- T.R Balu
- Vaiyenthi
- Thulashi
- Radha Rani
- Joker Thulasi

== Awards and nominations ==
Year	Award	Category	Recipient	Role	Result
2010	Mylapore Academy Television Awards 2010	Best Screenplay/Dialogue Writer	V. Thiruselvam		Won
2010	Mylapore Academy Television Awards 2010	Best Director	V. Thiruselvam		Won
2010	Mylapore Academy Television Awards 2010	Best Character Actress	Devipriya		Won
2010	Mylapore Academy Television Awards 2010	Best Cinematographer	Thiyagarajan		Won
2010	Mylapore Academy Television Awards 2010	K.Balachander Silver Rolling Trophy for All Rounder	V. Thiruselvam		Won
2017	Tamil Nadu State Television Awards for 2011	Best Actor	Senu	Manohar	Won
