= Janani (TV series) =

Indian Kannada-language soap opera

- Genre: Family; Drama
- Written by: Sri Devi Manjunath
- Story by: Dialogues: Sri Devi Manjunath
- Directed by: Honnesh Ramachandra
- Starring: Varshika Nayak; Shwetha B; Varshitha Seni
- Opening theme: Gudiya Huduki Horata Hennu; Anuradha Bhat (Vocals)
- Country of origin: India
- Original language: Kannada
- No. of seasons: 1

Production
- Producer: Chi. Guru Dutt
- Camera setup: Multi-camera
- Running time: 20–22 minutes
- Production company: Sharada Cinemas

Original release
- Network: Udaya TV
- Release: 15 August 2022 – 27 October 2024

Related
- Ethirneechal

Janani is a 2022 Indian-Kannada language family drama which premiered on Udaya TV on 15 August 2022 and ended on 27 October 2024, starring Varshika, Shwetha, Roopa and Varshitha Seni. The show is an official remake of critically acclaimed Tamil serial Ethirneechal.

== Cast ==
=== Main ===
- Varshika Nayak as Janani Pruthviraj
- Shwetha B as Bharghavi Dharmaraj
- Roopa (2022 - 2023) / Ruthu Sai as Vani Yatiraj
- Shilpa Iyer (2022-2023) / Varshitha Seni (2023 - ) as Anagha Keerthiraj

=== Supporting ===
- Muniraju as Dharma Raj
- Kiran Kinnu (2022 - 2023) / Bhavish Gowda (2023 - ) as Pruthvi Raj
- Pushpa Swami as Jayamma
- Shylashri (2022 - 2023) / Vijaya Latha K (2023 - ) as S.Tara Devi M.A.
- Lakshman (2022 - 2023) / Santosh (2023 - ) as Yati Raj
- Arunkumar Gowda as Keerthi Raj
- Bhanupriya Shetty as Aishwarya
- Pradeep Tiptur
- Divya Gopal
- Radhika Shetty
- Santosh Raj as Gowtham
- Shashank S Wazarkar as S K Raj Varma
- Sushma Shekhar as Bhuvaneshwari

== Production ==
- The serial marks the debut of actor Chi. Guru Dutt as a producer for the first time.

== Adaptations ==
Language	Title	Original release	Network(s)	Last aired	Notes	Ref.
Tamil	Ethirneechal எதிர்நீச்சல்	7 February 2022	Sun TV	8 June 2024	Original	
Telugu	Uppena ఉప్పెన	4 April 2022	Gemini TV	22 June 2024	Remake	
Malayalam	Kanalpoovu കനല്പ്പൂവ്	24 July 2022	Surya TV	27 October 2024	Remake	
Kannada	Janani ಜನನಿ	15 August 2022	Udaya TV	27 October 2024	Remake	
Bengali	Alor Theekana আলোর ঠিকানা	19 September 2022	Sun Bangla	15 October 2023	Remake	
Marathi	Shabbas Sunbai शाब्बास सूनबाई	14 November 2022	Sun Marathi	15 July 2023	Remake	
