= Sathyapriya =

Indian actress (born 1948)

- Born: Sathyavathi; 4 March 1953 (age 73); Vizianagaram, Andhra Pradesh, India
- Occupation: Actress
- Spouse: N. S. Mukunda (died)
- Children: Ravi Siddartha; Lakshmi

Sathyapriya (born Sathyavathi; 4 March 1953) is an Indian actress who predominantly works in Tamil and Kannada films along with few Telugu and Malayalam films.

== Career ==
Some of her films are Pudhea Paadhai (1989), Chinna Gounder (1992), Roja (1992), Baashha (1995) and Solla Marandha Kadhai (2002).

Later Sathyapriya acted in various TV shows like Kolangal, Chithiram Pesuthadi, Avalum Naanum, Kalyana Parisu, Mahalakshmi, Neethane Enthan Ponvasantham, Rajamannar Vagaiyara and Ethirneechal.

== Partial filmography ==
=== Tamil films ===
Year	Film	Role	Notes
1975	Manjal Mugame Varuga		
1975	Munniravu Neram		
1976	Perum Pugazhum	Radha	
1977	Enna Thavam Seithen		
1977	Dheepam	Asha	
1977	Thaaliya Salangaiya	Bhuvaneswari (Bhuvana)	
1977	Sainthadamma Sainthadu		
1978	Pilot Premnath		
1978	Kannan Oru Kai Kuzhandhai	Usha	
1978	Rajavuketha Rani		
1978	Vanakkatukuriya Kathaliye		
1978	Ival Oru Seethai		
1978	Manidharil Ithanai Nirangala	Devaki	
1979	Appothey Sonneyney Keetiya		
1979	Naan Nandri Solven		
1979	Muthal Iravu		
1979	Mambazhathu Vandu		
1980	Muyalukku Moonu Kal		
1982	Pagadai Panirendu	Renuka	
1983	Unmaigal		
1989	Pudhea Paadhai	Annapoorniyamma	
1989	Thennattu Vengai		
1990	Panakkaran	Pushpa	
1990	Paattali Magan		
1990	Nalla Kaalam Porandaachu	Maria	
1990	Anjali		
1990	Ethir Kaatru		
1990	Madurai Veeran Enga Saami	Nachiyar	
1990	Periya Veetu Pannakkaran		
1990	Mounam Sammadham		
1990	Durga		
1990	Aerikarai Poongaatre		
1990	Paattali Magan		
1991	Pudhu Manithan	Saradha	
1991	En Aasai Rasathi		
1991	Vasanthakala Paravai		
1991	Moondrezhuthil En Moochirukkum	Rosey	
1992	Rickshaw Mama		
1992	Agni Paarvai		
1992	Chinna Gounder	Sundari	
1992	Roja	Rishikumar's Mother	
1992	Pangali		
1993	Kizhakke Varum Paattu		
1993	Karuppu Vellai		
1993	Athma	Naveen's mother	
1993	Shenbagam		
1993	Suriyan Chandiran		
1993	Pathini Penn		
1993	Dharma Seelan	Nun	
1994	Rajakumaran	Vaidehi's mother	
1994	Chinna Madam	Gayathri's mother	
1994	Seevalaperi Pandi	Grams' wife	
1994	Aranmanai Kaavalan		
1994	Duet		
1994	Chinna Pulla	Valliammai's mother	
1994	Mettupatti Mirasu	Deivanai	
1994	Muthal Payanam		
1994	Veera Padhakkam		
1995	Baashha	Vijayalakshmi	
1995	Muthukulikka Vaariyala		
1995	Rajavin Parvaiyile		
1995	Periya Kudumbam	Shanthi's Mother	
1995	Ayudha Poojai	Krishnasamy's mother	
1995	Karnaa	Karnaa's adopted mother	
1995	Gandhi Pirantha Mann		
1995	En Pondatti Nallava		
1995	Maaman Magal	Muthurasu's mother	
1996	Kizhakku Mugam	Poongodi's mother	
1996	Namma Ooru Raasa		
1996	Krishna		
1996	Namma Ooru Raasa		
1997	Nesam	Madhu's mother	
1997	Suryavamsam	Subbulakshmi	
1997	Roja Malare	Lakshmi	
1998	Kondattam	Vidya's mother	
1998	Dhinamdhorum	Booma's mother	
1998	Harichandran	Harichandran's mother	
1998	Santhosham		
1998	Unnidathil Ennai Koduthen	Janaki	
1998	Desiya Geetham	Guru Amma	
1998	Uyirodu Uyiraga	Guest Appearance	
1998	Ponmaanai Thedi	Hamsavalli	
1998	Pooveli	Maha's mother	
1999	Unnai Thedi	Rajalakshmi	
1999	Ullathai Killathe		
1999	Padayappa	Nilambari's mother	
1999	Poomagal Oorvalam	Meenakshi	
1999	Nenjinile	Karunakaran's mother	
1999	Nee Varuvai Ena	Lakshmi	
1999	Ooty	Charulatha's mother	
1999	Kannupada Poguthaiya	Paarijaatham	
1999	Sundari Neeyum Sundaran Naanum	Mangamma	
1999	Unnaruge Naan Irundhal	Sathyavadi	
1999	Aasaiyil Oru Kaditham	Lakshmi's mother	
2000	Kandukondain Kandukondain	Manohar's mother	
2000	Unakkaga Mattum	Lakshmi's mother	
2000	Vetri Kodi Kattu	Valli's mother	
2000	Seenu	Seetha, Seenu's mother	
2000	Unnai Kann Theduthey		
2000	Maayi	Bhuvaneshwari's mother	
2001	Friends	Gautham's mother	
2001	Ninaikkatha Naalillai	Arun's mother	
2001	Poovellam Un Vasam		
2002	Amaiyappan		
2002	Unnai Ninaithu	Radha's mother	
2002	Ezhumalai	Nagalingam's sister	
2002	Solla Marandha Kadhai		
2002	Punnagai Desam	Priya's Mother	
2002	Bagavathi	Priya's mother	
2003	Kadhaludan		
2003	Lesa Lesa	Chandru's grandmother	
2003	Oru Thadava Sonna		
2003	Ennai Thalatta Varuvala		
2003	Vani Mahal		
2004	Jana	Mahalakshmi	
2004	Jore	Lingam's wife	
2005	Amudhey	Dhinakar's mother	
2005	Iyer IPS	Parameshwari's mother	
2005	Englishkaran		
2005	Aanai		
2005	Varapogum Sooriyane		
2005	Ambuttu Imbuttu Embuttu	Savithri	
2006	Kalvanin Kadhali	Tina's Boss	
2006	Chithiram Pesuthadi	Thiru's mother	
2006	Ilakkanam		
2006	Aattam	Karthik's mother	
2007	Adavadi	Bharath's mother	
2008	Thangam		
2009	Newtonin Moondram Vidhi		
2009	Karthik Anitha		
2010	Naane Ennul Illai		
2010	Goa	Samikannu's mother	
2012	Kadhal Paathai		
2012	Kathalar Kathai		
2013	Sibi		
2014	Vaayai Moodi Pesavum	Thambidurai's wife	
2014	Vazhum Dheivam		
2021	Ainthu Unarvugal		
2021	Arakkargal		Short film
2022	Kombu Vatcha Singamda		

=== Kannada films ===
Year	Film	Role	Notes
1976	Besuge	Liz	Credited as Anuradha
1977	Pavana Ganga	Yamuna	Credited as Anuradha
1977	Maagiya Kanasu	Teacher	
1977	Mugdha Manava		
1977	Veera Sindhoora Lakshmana		
1979	Dharmasere	Leela	
1983	Avala Neralu		
1983	Gandharvagiri	Guest Appearance	
1989	Premagni		
1990	Ekalavya		
1990	Durgashtami		
1990	Hosa Jeevana		
1992	Entede Bhanta		
1995	Karulina Kudi		
1996	Anuraga Devathe		
1997	Amrutha Varshini	Abhi's mother	
1997	Rangena Halliyage Rangada Rangegowda	Bangaram	
1997	Choo Baana		
1997	Balida Mane	Gangamma	
1998	My Dear Tiger		
1999	Chandrodaya	Divya's mother	
2000	Soorappa	Soorappa's mother	
2001	Kotigobba		
2002	Balagalittu Olage Baa		
2003	Chandra Chakori		
2003	Gokarna		
2003	Ondagona Baa		
2004	Kadamba		
2010	Prithivi	Gowri	
2013	Bangari		
2014	Paramashiva		

=== Malayalam films ===
Year	Film	Role	Notes
1978	Chakraayudham		
1983	Kanikonna		
1984	Thirakal	Sarala	
1992	Poochakkaru Mani Kettum	Gopika's mother	
1994	Shudhamadhalam	Unnimaya's mother	
1994	The City	Thangamani	
1994	Dadha	Padmakshi	
1995	Thacholi Varghese Chekavar	Rema	
1996	Pallivathukkal Thommichan	Thommichan's wife	
1996	Dilliwala Rajakumaran	Maharani	
1996	Lalanam	Vinod's mother	
1997	Innalakalilathe		
1997	Vamsam	Kochammini	
1997	Gangothri	Ramaiyer's wife	
1997	Manthra Mothiram	Meenakshi	
1998	Anuragakottaram	Mary	
2009	Venalmaram	Janu	
2014	Samsaaram Aarogyathinu Haanikaram	Adhikeshavan's wife	

=== Telugu films ===
Year	Film	Role	Notes
1977	Palle Seema		
1977	Janma Janmala Bandham	Krishna's cousin	
1989	Koduku Diddina Kapuram	Parvath	
1990	Puttinti Pattu Cheera		
1991	Palleturi Pellam		
1992	Prema Vijeta	Ganga	
1994	Angarakshakudu		
1997	Evandi Pelli Chesukondi	Geetha's mother	
1998	Suryavamsam	Justice Dakshana Murthy's wife	
1998	Evandi Pelli Chesukondi		
2001	Snehamante Idera	Gautham's mother	
2002	Lahiri Lahiri Lahirilo	Balaramaiah Naidu's wife	
2002	Siva Rama Raju	Siva Rama Raju's aunt	
2003	Gudachari No. 1		
2003	Oka Raju Oka Rani		

=== Hindi films ===
Year	Film	Role
1974	Balak Dhruv	Suruchi

=== Dubbing artist ===
Actress	Film	Language
Kaviyoor Ponnamma	Sathya	Telugu (dubbed)
Arundhati Nag	Merupu Kalalu	Telugu (dubbed)
Seema	Paravasam	Telugu (dubbed)
Srividya	Priyuralu Pilichindi	Telugu (dubbed)
Srividya	Alludu	Telugu (dubbed)
Shanthi Williams	Aparichitudu	Telugu (dubbed)
Sheela	Chandramukhi	Telugu (dubbed)
Rekha	Krrish	Tamil (dubbed)
Vadivukkarasi	Sivaji: The Boss	Telugu (dubbed)
Revathi Sankaran	Robot	Telugu (dubbed)

== Television ==
Serials

Year	Title	Role	Language	Channel
	Pagal Kanavu		Tamil	DD
1999–2000	Anubandham		Telugu	Gemini TV
2000	Punnagai		Tamil	Sun TV
2000	Micro Thodargal-Azhukku Vetti		Tamil	Raj TV
2001	Idho Boopalam		Tamil	Raj TV
2001	Srimathi		Telugu	Gemini TV
2003–2009	Kolangal	Karpagam	Tamil	Sun TV
2003	Anbu Manam		Tamil	Sun TV
2006–2007	Surya	Lakshmi	Tamil	Sun TV
2007–2008	Bharathi		Tamil	Kalaignar TV
2007	Swami Ayyappan	Lakshmi / Gurumatha	Malayalam	Asianet
2008–2009	Namma Kudumbam	Bhama	Tamil	Kalaignar TV
2009–2010	Roja Kootam		Tamil	Star Vijay
2009	Aliyanmarum Penganmarum		Malayalam	Amrita TV
2009	Kanmaniye	Sudhesi Mami	Tamil	Sun TV
2009–2012	Idhayam	Padma	Tamil	Sun TV
2011–2014	Muthaaram	Saradha	Tamil	Sun TV
2011–2012	Shanthi Nilayam	Sivakami	Tamil	Jaya TV
2013	Pokkisham	Lawyer	Tamil	Kalaignar TV
2013–2014	Vamsam	Vasantha	Tamil	Sun TV
2013–2014	Chithiram Pesuthadi		Tamil	Jaya TV
2018–2019	Avalum Naanum	Bhanumathi	Tamil	Star Vijay
2018–2019	Kalyana Parisu	Tripura Sundari	Tamil	Sun TV
2019	Run		Tamil	Sun TV
2019	Mahalakshmi	Vijayalakshmi	Tamil	Sun TV
2020–2021	Neethane Enthan Ponvasantham	Sharadha	Tamil	Zee Tamizh
2021	Rajamannar Vagaiyara		Tamil	Polimer TV
2022–2024	Ethirneechal	Visalatchi	Tamil	Sun TV
2024–Present	Ethirneechal Thodargiradhu	Visalatchi	Tamil	Sun TV
2026	Annamalai Kudumbam	Vellaiyammal	Tamil	Zee Tamil

Shows

Year	Title	Language	Role	Channel
2022	Vanakkam Tamizha	Tamil	Guest	Sun TV
2022	Porantha Veeda Pugundha Veeda	Tamil	Herself	Sun TV
2022	Rani Magarani	Tamil	Contestant	Sun TV
2023	Vanakkam Tamizha	Tamil		Sun TV
2023	Star Music Season 4	Tamil	Contestant	Star Vijay
2024	Naanga Ready Neenga Ready Ah	Tamil	Judge	Sun TV

== Dramas ==
- Dharma Jyothi
- Radham Kopam Varatha
- Swamiyar Aava Poore
- Ezhuswarangal
