= V. Thiruselvam =

Indian television director and actor

Thiruselvam Velusamy
- Born: Thiruselvam Velusamy; 11 February 1971 (age 55); Nadiyam, Peravurani Taluk, Thanjavur district, Tamil Nadu
- Occupation: Television director Actor
- Years active: 2001 – present
- Children: Priyadarshini

Thiruselvam Velusamy known professionally as V. Thiruselvam is an Indian television director and actor. Thiruselvam is best known for director and playing the role of 'Tholkapian' in the Tamil-language Family television series Kolangal.

== Career ==
During early 2012, Thiruselvam making his debut as a Television producer in 'Pokkisham' serial, That serial aired on Kalaignar TV from 2012 to 2013. He also played the role of the lead actor. In 2013 Writer and director another serial Chithiram pesuthadi in 2015 Kairasi Kudumbam for Jaya TV.

He also writes and screenplay the Vikatan TV YouTube channel's drama, 'Vallamai Tharayo' in 2021. It was India's first digital daily series. He had another breakthrough in 2022 by Sun TV's serial Ethirneechal.

== Television ==
Year	Title	Director	Writer	Actor	Producer	Role	Networks	Notes
2002–2004	Metti Oli	No (Co-Director)	No	Yes	No	Gnanaraj a.k.a. Santhosh	Sun TV	
2003–2009	Kolangal	Yes	Yes	Yes	No	Tholkaapiyan "Thols"	Sun TV	
2005–2006	Alli Rajiyam	Yes	Yes	No	No		Sun TV	
2009–2011	Madhavi	Yes	Yes	No	No		Sun TV	
2012–2013	Pokkisham	Yes	Yes	Yes	Yes	Vasanthan	Kalaignar TV	
2013–2014	Chithiram Pesuthadi	Yes	Yes	Yes	Yes	Arunmozhi	Jaya TV	
2015–2017	Kairasi Kudumbam	Yes	Yes	No	Yes		Jaya TV	
2020–2021	Vallamai Tharayo	No	Yes	No	No		Vikatan TV	
2022–2024	Ethirneechal	Yes	Yes	Yes	Yes	Jeevanantham	Sun TV	
2024–present	Ethirneechal Thodargiradhu	Yes	Yes	Yes	Yes	Jeevanantham	Sun TV	

== Awards and nominations ==
Year	Award	Category	Television Serials	Result
2006	Tamil Nadu State Television Awards	Best Achiever	Kolangal	Won
2007	Tamil Nadu State Television Awards	Best Television Serial (First Prize)	Kolangal	Won
2009	Tamil Nadu State Television Awards	Best Story	Kolangal	Won
2010	Sun Kudumbam Awards	Best Supporting Actor	Kolangal	Won
2010	Sun Kudumbam Awards	Best Screenwriter	Kolangal	Won
2010	Sun Kudumbam Awards	Best Director	Kolangal	Won
2010	Sun Kudumbam Awards	Best Director (Special Prize)	Kolangal	Won
2023	Sun Kudumbam Awards	Best Director	Ethirneechal	Won
2024	Ananda Vikatan Television Awards	Best Director - Critic's choice	Ethirneechal	Won
2025	Ananda Vikatan Television Awards	Best Screenplay	Ethirneechal	Won
