= Vidhi (TV series) =

- Genre: Drama
- Written by: Thavan Suppaiya; Marudhu Shankar (Dialogues)
- Screenplay by: C.U.Muthuselvan
- Story by: Lydia Paul
- Directed by: K. Shiva (1-101). G.Stalin (102-262)
- Creative director: A. Guru Baran
- Starring: Sirija; Rashmi Jayraj; Vibhu Raman; Ravi Raj; Anu; Yuvasri; Surjith Ansary; Lenin Anpan
- Theme music composer: Dhina
- Opening theme: "Vidhiye Vidhiye"
- Country of origin: India
- Original language: Tamil
- No. of seasons: 1
- No. of episodes: 262

Production
- Producer: San Media Ltd
- Cinematography: S.Ezhilselvan
- Editors: C.S. Rajapradeep; Muralikrishnan
- Camera setup: Multi-camera
- Running time: approx. 20-22 minutes per episode
- Production company: San Media Limited

Original release
- Network: Sun TV
- Release: 6 March 2017 – 20 January 2018

Vidhi (transl. Fate) is a 2017-2018 Indian Tamil-language family television series starring Sirija, Rashmi Jayraj, Vibhu Raman, Ravi Raj, Surjith Ansary and Anu. It replaced Nijangal and was broadcast on Sun TV on Monday to Saturday from 6 March 2017 to 20 January 2018 for 301 episodes. It was produced by San Media Ltd and directed by Stalin Iniya. The title track was composed by Dhina and sung by Karthik and Rita with lyrics by Vairamuthu. It ended on 20 January 2018.

== Synopsis ==
Vidhi is a Tamil romance and drama written by Thavan Suppaiya and Marudhu Shankar, who also wrote the dialogues for the characters. Lydia Paul developed the story, and Stalin Iniya and Guru Balan directed it. A typical Tamil soap which involves love, heartbreak, and romance won the hearts of the Tamil audience.

It aired on Sun TV on March 6, 2017, and it starts at 1 p.m. The title track and songs were written and composed by Dhina and Vairamuthu. Karthik, the Tamil singer, sang the song "Vidhiye Vidhiye" as his debut. The characters are Nila, played by Sirija; Rashmi; Raghu, played by Jagathish; and Ravi Raj, along with Azhagesan, Maragadham, and Dhinesh. They are the ones that play the leading roles and are vital to this show.

Nila is a housewife who is married to Raghu. Due to private reasons, both cannot bring a child into the world, so they decide to adopt one from an unmarried lady, Diya. Her husband, Siddharth, agrees to the adoption, but the twist arises when Raghu's sister, Chitra, marries him.

Problems find their way into this household as everyone notices the awkwardness of having the adopted child and his father in the same family but with different relationships. The feeling turns into discontentment, and slowly it becomes resentment between the two parties. Diya is not happy with her husband getting remarried, and that too with a close relative of the parent who adopted her child.

The animosity grows in the household, and the feelings turn into verbal insults and abuses of each other as they try to manage the situation. Siddharth is attracted to Chitra, and they are not willing to separate when her brother tries to convince her. Meanwhile, they consider taking away his child, but it is more complicated than that as the adoption papers are already signed and the agency managed the entire process.

To keep the child, the families must come to a consensus. They should be in agreement with each other. But staying calm is something that seems impossible in these situations. As the show goes on, the viewers can only be updated with each episode and find out what happens next.

== Cast ==
=== Main cast ===
- Sreeja as Dr.Nila Raghu
- Rashmi Jayraj as Dhiya Dev
- Vibhu Raman as Raghu
- Karan Sagar as Dev

=== Recurring cast ===
- Parthi as Magesh
- Ravi Raj
- Bombay Babu as Azhagesan
- Revathy Shankar as Maragadham
- Surjith Ansary as Dhinesh
- Anu as Chithra
- Yuvasri
- Sarath Chandra
- Mounica Devi
- Anitha
- Hemalatha
- Lenin Anpan
- Devipriya as Punithavathi
- Haripriya Isai as Mythili
- Sripriya
- Hema Rajkumar
- Shayrin
- David
- Surender
- Rajesh
- Vairavaraj

== Title song ==
The title suntv song was written by lyricist Vairamuthu, composed by Dhina and sung by Karthik and Rita.

=== Soundtrack ===
Track list
No.	Title	Lyrics	Music	Singer(s)	Length
1.	"Vidhiye Vidhiye (விதியே விதியே) Title Song"	Vairamuthu	Dhina	Karthik and Rita	3:00

== Production ==
The series was directed by Stalin Iniya. It was produced by San Media Ltd, along with the production crew of 2004-2018 Sun TV serials Ahalya (2004-2006), Bandham (2006-2009), Uravugal (2009-2012) and Bommalattam (2012-2016).
