= Ethirneechal (TV series) =

Indian television series

- Montage of Season 2
- Also known as: Ethirneechal Thodargiradhu
- Genre: Drama
- Written by: V. Thiruselvam; Dialogues: Damal Shrividhya
- Screenplay by: V. Thiruselvam
- Directed by: V. Thiruselvam
- Starring: Parvathy Venkitaramanan; Sabari Prasanth; Sirija; Priyadharshini; Haripriya Isai
- Theme music composer: Srinivas
- Opening theme: "Vidiyal Thedum Vinmeen Penne"; Sharanya Srinivas; Srinidhi (Vocals); Balachandran (Lyrics)
- Composers: "Background Music"; Selvam
- Country of origin: India
- Original language: Tamil
- No. of seasons: 2
- No. of episodes: 1410+

Production
- Executive producer: Sri Vidhya
- Producer: V. Thiruselvam
- Production location: Tamil Nadu
- Cinematography: Santhanam
- Editor: Aravind Anbalagan
- Camera setup: Multi-Camera
- Running time: approx. 22–24 minutes per episode
- Production companies: Sun Entertainment; Thiruselvam Theatres

Original release
- Network: Sun TV
- Release: 7 February 2022 – present

Ethirneechal (transl. Swimming against the tide) is an Indian Tamil-language drama television series that aired on Sun TV. The series starred actors Madhumitha Hirannaiah, Sabari Prasanth, Kaniha, Priyadharshini, and Haripriya Isai in lead roles. This show was produced by Sun Entertainment and Thiruselvam Theatres. Dialogues were written by Sri Vidhya and written and directed by V. Thiruselvam. The series is one of the most-popular and most-watched TV shows in Tamil Nadu since its launch. The series premiered on 7 February 2022 and ended on 8 June 2024 with 744 episodes.

The second season titled Ethirneechal Thodargiradhu (transl. Swimming against the tide 'Continues') premiered on 23 December 2024. It starred Parvathy Venkitaramanan, Sabari Prasanth alongside Sirija, Priyadharshini and Haripriya Isai.

== Series overview ==
Series	Episodes	Originally released	
Series	Episodes	First released	Last released
1	744	7 February 2022	8 June 2024
2	666+	23 December 2024	Present

== Synopsis ==
=== Season 1 ===
Nachiappan defies his rich, male chauvinist parents to marry the poorer Parvathi, and they raise their daughters Janani and Anjana in a joint family. Despite Nachiappan's controlling nature, he is wooed by a marriage proposal from business tycoon Gunasekaran alias AGS Aadhimuthu for his brother Shakthivel. Unaware of the mistreatment of Gunasekaran's daughters-in-law Eshwari, Renuka, and Nandhini & Janani Nachiappan falls for the lie that Janani will be appointed as MD in Gunasekaran's company. Eventually, Janani, a high achiever, marries Shakthivel, the youngest brother in the Aadhimuthu family.

As time passes, Janani learns the harsh reality of her in-laws' treatment of women. Her husband Shakthivel, haunted by childhood trauma, lacks the courage to confront his family. Janani's cousin Vasu warns her, but she proceeds with the marriage. Initially supportive, Shakthivel turns against Janani due to emotional manipulation from his elder brother Aadhi Gunasekaran alias AGS.

Janani's co-sisters Eshwari, Renuka, and Nandhini are also educated women married to uneducated husbands in the Aadhimuthu family. The sisters face restrictions and are forced to be housekeepers by their controlled husbands – Gunasekaran Aadhimuthu alias AGS, Gnanasekaran Aadhimuthu, Kathirvel Aadhimuthu, and Shakthivel Aadhimuthu. The story unfolds as Janani faces the challenges within her new family, aiming to bring about positive change with the help of Pattammal, Gunasekaran's grandmother.

Janani, standing against male chauvinism, leaves the Aadhimuthu household after Shakthivel doubted her character. Pattamal, who holds a 40% shares in Aadhimuthu properties and businesses, joins Janani against Gunasekaran for the rights of Janani and the other daughters-in-law.

Guided by advice from Pattammal, Janani returns to help her co-sisters to gain independence. Shakthivel realizes his mistakes, and the story unfolds as Janani strives to empower herself and her co-sisters against the backdrop of family dynamics and societal challenges. In a bid to get hold of the 40% property, Gunasekaran poisons Pattammal who is supposedly killed in a bomb blast planned by him. How Janani will strengthen herself and liberate her co-sisters forms the crux of the story.

At the end of season 1, Gunasekaran was arrested for his crimes. During the court proceedings, Pattammal entered the courtroom, shocking everyone, and testified against Gunasekaran, who was found guilty of all his crimes and was sentenced to lifetime imprisonment. Motivated by Pattammal, all the four daughters in law leave the Aadhimuthu household to pursue their dreams.

=== Season 2 ===
After 6 Months The Story Continues from the End of Season 1. After the defeat of Gunasekaran "AGS" Aadhimuthu, Janani and the rest of the women in the household leave to pursue their dreams. However, Gunasekaran, though defeated, continues to create obstacles for these women in subtle and disruptive ways. How Janani & her co-sisters are breaking down barriers to carve out their space in an exciting & empowering journey as they strive to earn their family's understanding and protect relationships forms the crux of the story.

== Cast and characters ==
=== Main ===
- Madhumitha Hirannaiah as Janani Sakthivel: Nachiyappan and Parvathi's eldest daughter; (2022–Jun.2024)
  - Parvathy Venkitaramanan as Janani Sakthivel: Nachiyappan and Parvathi's eldest daughter; (Dec.2024–present)
- Sabari Prasanth as Sakthivel "Sakthi" Aadhimuthu: Aadhimuthu and Visalatchi's youngest son; (2022–present)
- Kaniha as Eshwari Gunasekaran: Sethuraman and Savitri's daughter; (2022–Aug.2025)
  - Sirija as Eshwari Gunasekaran: Sethuraman and Savitri's daughter; (Mar.2026–present)
- Priyadharshini as Renuka Gnanasekaran: Alamelu's daughter; (2022–present)
- Haripriya Isai as Nandhini Kathirvel: Ramachandran and Valliammal's daughter; (2022–present)
- Diya Menon as Madhivathani Rajendran IAS: Raavanan's wife; (2025–present)

=== Recurring ===
- G.Marimuthu as Gunasekaran "AGS" Aadhimuthu: Aadhimuthu and Visalatchi's eldest son; (2022–Sep.2023)
  - Vela Ramamoorthy as Gunasekaran "AGS" Aadhimuthu: Aadhimuthu and Visalatchi's eldest son; (Oct.2023–present)
- Abhishek Shankar as Captain Oliver Devasagayam (2026-present) (Antagonist)
- Ashwin Dhakshin as Raavanan "Raana" Aadhimuthu: Aadhimuthu and Devaki's son; (2026–present) (Antagonist)
- Sathyapriya as Visalatchi: Aadhimuthu's first wife; Gunasekaran, Gnanam, Kathir, Sakthi and Aadhirai's mother (2022–present)
- Kamalesh PK as Gnanasekaran "Gnanam" Aadhimuthu: Aadhimuthu and Visalatchi's second son; (2022–present)
- Vibhu Raman as Kathirvel "Kathir" Aadhimuthu: Aadhimuthu and Visalatchi's third son;(2022-present)
- Sathya Devarajan as Aadhiraiselvi "Aadhirai" Aadhimuthu: Aadhimuthu and Visalatchi's daughter; (2022–Jan.2025)
- Monisha Vijay as Priyadharshini "Dharshini" Gunasekaran: Gunasekaran and Eshwari's daughter; (2022–present)
- Rithik Raghavendra as Priyadharshan "Dharshan" Gunasekaran: Gunasekaran and Eshwari's son; (2022–present)
- Aishwarya Rathinam as Aishwarya "Aishu" Gnanasekaran: Gnanasekaran and Renuka's daughter; (2022–June.2024)
  - Mai Jananee as Aishwarya "Aishu" Gnanasekaran: Gnanasekaran and Renuka's daughter; (Dec.2024–Mar.2025)
- Farzana Ansari as Thara Kathirvel: Kathirvel and Nandhini's daughter; (2022–June.2024)
  - Prajna Rani Aravind as Thara Kathirvel: Kathirvel and Nandhini's daughter; (Dec.2024–present)
- Bombay Gnanam as R. Pattammal MA: Aadhimuthu's mother; (2022–present)
- Vimalkumar J as Karikalan Ramalimgam: Ramalingam and Jhansi Rani's son; Aadhirai's ex-husband (2022–present)

=== Other cast ===
- V. Thiruselvam as Jeevanandham: Social activist; Eshwari's ex-love interest and friend; Kayalvizhi's widower; (2023–2025)
- Dhachani Santha Soruban as Kotravai IPS: A police officer (2024–present)
- Rajishree as Bhargavi: Gurunathan's daughter; (2025–2026)
- Vishnu Vasudev as Sethuraman: Savitri's widower; Eshwari's father; Dharshan and Dharshini's grandfather (2022–present)
- Bharathi Kannan as Kovai Subaiah: Visalatchi's younger brother (2022–present)
- Sherin Farhana as Anbukkarasi "Anbu" Periyasami: Poster Periyasami's younger daughter; (2025–present)
- Gayathri Raja as Arivukkarasi "Arivu" Periyasami: Poster Periyasami's elder daughter (2025–present)
- Lakshmikanthan Sridharan as Mullaivendan "Mullai": Arivukkarasi and Anbukkarasi's cousin (2023; 2024–present)
- Radhika Vairavelavan as Charubala Rajavarman: a lawyer; SKR's wife; Gunasekaran's ex-love interest (2022–present)
- Rukmani as Alamelu: a former nurse; Renuka's mother; Aishwarya's grandmother (2022–present)
- Subhashini as Valliammal Ramachandran: Nandhini's mother; Thara's grandmother (2022–present)
- Chandrasekhar as Ramachandran: Nandhini's father; Thara's grandfather (2022–present)
- Som Soumyan as Nachiyappan: Meyyappan and Umayal's brother; Parvathi's husband; Janani and Anjana's father (2022–present)
- Keerthana as Parvathi Nachiyappan: Thiruvengadam's sister; Nachiyappan's wife; Janani and Anjana's mother (2022–present)
- Goudham Krishnan as Gowtham: Janani's best friend; (2022–present)
- Vaishnavi Nayak as Nivashini "Vasu" Thiruvengadam: Thiruvengadam and Padmavathi's daughter; Janani and Anjana's cousin; (2022–present)
- Giri Dwarakish as Arasu: SKR's first younger brother (2022–present)
- Gaayathri Krishnan as Jhansi Rani Ramalingam: Ramalingam's second wife; Karikalan's mother (2022–2025)
- Baby Deepti Shri as Venba Jeevanandham: Jeevanandham and Kayalvizhi's daughter (2023–2025)
- Poster Nandakumar as Poster Periyasami: Gunasekaran's friend (2025) (Dead)
- VJ Thara as Anjana Sidharth: Nachiyappan and Parvathi's younger daughter; (2022)
  - Swetha Senthilkumar as Anjana Sidharth: Nachiyappan and Parvathi's younger daughter; (2024)
- Dinesh Mourougane as Sidharth Ramanathan: Umayal and Ramanathan's son; Keerthi's brother; Ramasamy, Krishna Swamy, Janani and Anjana's cousin; Anjana's husband (2024)
- Subramani as Killivalavan aka Valavan: Ex-police officer; Gunasekaran's crime partner; Kayalvizhi's murderer (2023–2024)
- Ziba Shirin as Farhana: Jeevanandham's sidekick (2023)
- Balaji as Thiruvengadam: Parvathi's brother; Padmavathi's husband; Sriram and Vasu's father (2022–2023; 2026)
- Vasavi as Padmavathi: Thiruvengadam's wife; Sriram and Vasu's mother (2022)
- Subramanian Gopalakrishnan as Sriram Thiruvengadam: Thiruvengadam and Padmavathi's son; Vasu's brother; Janani and Anjana's cousin (2022)
- Vasudevan Venugopal as Subramaniam Krishnamoorthy Rajavarman alias SKR: Arasu, Arun and Karthikeyan's brother; Charubala's husband; Gunasekaran's former MD turned business-rival (2022–2025)
- Chaanakyaa as Arunkumar alias Arun: SKR's second younger brother; Aadhirai's ex-lover (2022–2023)
- Madhu Karthik as Karthikeyan: SKR's youngest brother (2022–2023)
- Vj Sukumaran as Ashwin: Kevin’s friend (Dead) (2025)
- Vishva as Vishva: Raana's manager (2025)
- Priyadarshini Panneerselvam as Arundhati: Janani's friend (2026)
- Apollo Ravi as Kadambavanam: Gunasekaran's sidekick (2022–2024)
- Johithya as Ilaveni: Jeevanandham's sidekick (2023)
- Archana as Rani: Maid in Gunasekaran's house (2022)
- Sabarish Selvaraj as Kumar: Arasu's sidekick (2022–2023)
- Anbarasi as Anbarasi: Janani's friend (2022)
- RJ Nelu as Krishna Swamy Meyyappan: Meyyappan and Rajalakshmi's younger son; Ramasamy's brother; Janani, Anjana, Sidharth and Keerthi's cousin (2023–2024)
- Maaran Chandrasekaran as Ramasamy Meyyappan: Meyyappan and Rajalakshmi's elder son; Krishna Swamy's brother; Janani, Anjana, Sidharth and Keerthis cousin (2023–2025)
- Bindhu Pankaj as Umayal Ramanathan: Meyyappan and Nachiyappan's sister; Ramanathan's wife; Sidharth and Keerthi's mother (2023–2024)
- T. K. Kala as Meyyappan, Umayal and Nachiyappan's mother; Ramasamy, Krishna Swamy, Janani, Anjana, Sidharth and Keerthi's grandmother (2023–2024)
- VJ Keerthi as Keerthi Ramanathan: Umayal's daughter; Sidharth's sister; Ramasamy, Krishna Swamy, Janani and Anjana's cousin (2023–2024)
- Muthu Lakshmi as Rajalakshmi Meyyappan: Meyyapan's wife; Ramasamy and Krishnasamy's mother (2023–2024)
- Jillu Vikram as Vikram: Janani's friend (2022)
- Abinaya as Kathija: Janani's friend (2022)
- Merwen Balaji as Kedhar: Janani's friend (2022)
- Hema Dayal as Kundavai Duraisaami: Sakthivel's ex-fiancée and business partner (2022; 2025)
- Mohan Vaidya as Gurunathan: Bhargavi's father (2025) (Dead)
- Eniyan S as Neducheziyan: Nandhini's cousin brother (2025)
- Jayashree as Jayashree Chandrasekhar: Chairman of Dharshan's college (2022; 2025)
- Meena Kumari as Kayalvizhi: Jeevanandham's wife; Venba's mother (2023) (Dead)
- Sudha Pushpa as Savithri Sethuraman: Sethuraman's wife; Eshwari's mother; Dharshan and Dharshini's grandmother (Dead) (2022)
- Abhinaya Palaniswamy as Kalaiarasi: Pattamal's nurse (2023)
- Kotravai as Meenakshi: A lawyer of Eshwari (2024)
- V. Sailaja as Devaki: Aadhimuthu's second wife; Rana's mother (2025) (Dead)
- Veernivas Sree as Prasad: Aishwarya's best friend (2025)
- Bhavana as Young Eshwari (2022)
- Prashanth as Young Jeevanandham (2022)

== Production ==
=== Development ===
In later September 2021, Sun Network announced that it would distribute the new Tamil serial, to be produced by Sun Entertainment and Thiruselvam Theatres and written and directed by V. Thiruselvam. The dialogues for the series are written by Sri Vidhya.

=== Casting ===
Kannada and Telugu actress Madhumitha Hirannaiah was selected as the female lead but was later replaced by actress Parvathy Venkatiramanan in the second season. Tamil film actress Kaniha was cast as one of the main leads, making her comeback to acting in Tamil serials after 14 years but in August 2025 she quit the series and was later replaced by Sirijain March 2026. Priyadharshini and Haripriya were cast as the parallel leads. Bombay Gnanam was cast as a supporting role, making her comeback to acting in Tamil serials after 10 years.

Film director and actor G. Marimuthu was selected as the negative lead till his death on 8 September 2023. He was replaced by actor/writer Vela Ramamoorthy. Sabari Prasanth was selected as the male lead. While Keerthana, Kamalesh, Merwen, Goutham K S, Vibhu Raman and Sathyapriya were also selected for supporting roles. In end of December 2023, actress/playback singer T. K. Kala joined the cast as Janani's paternal grandmother.

== Reception ==
=== TRP Record ===
In BARC Era, This is the first ever Television Series in Whole South India to Became No.1 in Both UR and Urban Markets from a 9.30 PM Slot.

=== Season 1 ===
==== Critical Response ====
The series gradually gained more popularity and viewership in January 2023 by its screenplay, and mainly for the natural and realistic acting. Ethirneechal gave tough competition for ratings to its same channel's top rated soap Kayal.

==== TRP Ratings ====
The show got a TVR of 6.54 on launching week on 7 February 2022.

In July 2023, the series was the most watched Tamil-language television series with 11.55 TVR.

The show got a TVR of 7.84 on its Climax week and the Last episode fetched 8.59 TVR on 8 June 2024.

===== 2022 =====
2022 TRP Ratings
Week	Year	BARC viewership	
Week	Year	TRP	Rank
Week 6	2022	6.54	10
Week 7	2022	6.41	11
Week 8	2022	6.79	10
Week 9	2022	6.96	10
Week 10	2022	7.03	8
Week 11	2022	7.29	9
Week 12	2022	7.29	9
Week 13	2022	7.03	9
Week 14	2022	6.77	9
Week 15	2022	6.76	9
Week 16	2022	6.33	9
Week 17	2022	6.95	8
Week 18	2022	6.79	8
Week 19	2022	7.09	8
Week 20	2022	7.52	8
Week 21	2022	7.83	6
Week 22	2022	7.68	6
Week 23	2022	6.79	6
Week 24	2022	7.19	6
Week 25	2022	7.65	6
Week 26	2022	8.00	6
Week 27	2022	7.73	6
Week 28	2022	8.00	7
Week 29	2022	7.20	6
Week 30	2022	8.09	6
Week 31	2022	7.47	6
Week 32	2022	8.13	6
Week 33	2022	7.86	7
Week 34	2022	7.20	6
Week 35	2022	7.32	6
Week 36	2022	7.75	6
Week 37	2022	8.05	6
Week 38	2022	8.22	6
Week 39	2022	8.23	6
Week 40	2022	7.72	6
Week 41	2022	7.64	6
Week 42	2022	8.03	6
Week 43	2022	7.51	7
Week 44	2022	7.58	6
Week 45	2022	8.19	6
Week 48	2022	9.48	5
Week 49	2022	8.95	6
Week 50	2022	9.10	5
Week 51	2022	9.12	5
Week 52	2022	9.09	6

===== 2023 =====
2023 TRP Ratings
Week	Year	BARC viewership	
Week	Year	TRP	Rank
Week 1	2023	9.48	4
Week 2	2023	9.33	4
Week 3	2023	7.90	5
Week 4	2023	8.78	5
Week 5	2023	8.62	5
Week 6	2023	8.96	4
Week 7	2023	9.14	3
Week 9	2023	9.66	5
Week 10	2023	9.82	4
Week 11	2023	9.31	5
Week 12	2023	9.24	4
Week 13	2023	8.84	5
Week 14	2023	8.91	3
Week 15	2023	8.97	3
Week 16	2023	8.75	4
Week 17	2023	8.49	4
Week 18	2023	8.50	5
Week 19	2023	8.29	5
Week 22	2023	8.80	4
Week 23	2023	8.94	3
Week 24	2023	9.28	2
Week 25	2023	11.16	1
Week 26	2023	10.83	1
Week 27	2023	10.88	2
Week 28	2023	10.65	2
Week 29	2023	11.24	2
Week 30	2023	11.55	2
Week 31	2023	11.01	2
Week 32	2023	10.22	2
Week 33	2023	10.53	2
Week 34	2023	11.45	1
Week 35	2023	10.42	2
Week 36	2023	10.79	1
Week 37	2023	10.08	1
Week 38	2023	9.88	1
Week 39	2023	10.18	2
Week 40	2023	11.54	1
Week 41	2023	10.66	2
Week 42	2023	9.55	5
Week 43	2023	10.38	4
Week 44	2023	9.99	4
Week 45	2023	9.76	3
Week 46	2023	9.65	4
Week 47	2023	9.79	4
Week 48	2023	9.89	4
Week 49	2023	9.18	4
Week 50	2023	9.75	4
Week 51	2023	9.88	4
Week 52	2023	8.75	4

===== 2024 =====
2024 TRP Ratings
Week	Year	BARC viewership	
Week	Year	TRP	Rank
Week 1	2024	9.07	5
Week 2	2024	9.59	4
Week 3	2024	9.19	3
Week 4	2024	9.98	3
Week 5	2024	9.92	4
Week 6	2024	10.39	4
Week 7	2024	10.68	2
Week 8	2024	10.39	4
Week 9	2024	10.33	2
Week 10	2024	10.64	2
Week 11	2024	10.01	3
Week 12	2024	9.33	3
Week 13	2024	8.74	3
Week 14	2024	8.67	3
Week 15	2024	8.27	3
Week 16	2024	8.00	4
Week 17	2024	8.61	3
Week 18	2024	8.06	3
Week 19	2024	7.54	3
Week 20	2024	7.28	6
Week 21	2024	7.11	5
Week 22	2024	7.92	4
Week 23	2024	7.84	3

=== Season 2 ===
==== TRP Ratings ====
The show got a TVR of 8.01 on launching week on 23 December 2024.

In October 2025, the series was the second most watched Tamil-language television series with 9.80 TVR.

===== 2024/2025 =====
2024/2025 TRP Ratings
Week	Year	BARC Viewership	
Week	Year	TRP	Rank
Week 52	2024	8.01	8
Week 53	2024	7.16	8
Week 1	2025	7.59	8
Week 2	2025	6.52	9
Week 3	2025	7.09	8
Week 4	2025	6.92	9
Week 5	2025	7.23	7
Week 6	2025	7.01	7
Week 7	2025	7.26	7
Week 8	2025	7.35	6
Week 9	2025	7.37	6
Week 10	2025	6.80	9
Week 11	2025	7.50	6
Week 12	2025	6.87	6
Week 13	2025	7.01	7
Week 14	2025	7.20	6
Week 15	2025	7.20	6
Week 16	2025	6.90	7
Week 17	2025	6.63	9
Week 18	2025	6.96	6
Week 19	2025	6.53	8
Week 20	2025	6.05	10
Week 21	2025	6.52	9
Week 22	2025	7.08	7

== Accolades ==
=== Season 1 ===
Year	Award (Note: Awards, festivals and organizations are in Alphabetical order.)	Category	Recipient(s)	Result	Ref.
2023	Behindwoods Gold Icons	Best Lead Cast On Television	Madhumitha Hirannaiah, Kaniha, Priyadharshini, Haripriya Isai	Won	
2023	Sun Kudumbam Viruthugal	Favourite Heroine	Madhumitha Hirannaiah	Won	
2023	Sun Kudumbam Viruthugal	Favourite Villain - Male	G. Marimuthu	Won	
2023	Sun Kudumbam Viruthugal	Best Director	V. Thiruselvam	Won	
2023	Sun Kudumbam Viruthugal	Favourite Serial	Ethirneechal	Won	
2023	Sun Kudumbam Viruthugal	Thanga Mangaigal	Kaniha, Priyadharshini, Haripriya Isai, Madhumitha Hirannaiah	Won	
2023	Sun Kudumbam Viruthugal	Best Script Writer	Sri Vidhya	Won	
2023	Sun Kudumbam Viruthugal	Favorite Comedian	Vimal Kumar J	Won	
2023	Sun Kudumbam Viruthugal	Lifetime Achievement Actress	Bombay Gnanam	Won	
2024	Ananda Vikatan Television Awards	Best Supporting Actress	Kaniha	Won	
2024	Ananda Vikatan Television Awards	Best Comedian - Female	Haripriya Isai	Won	
2024	Ananda Vikatan Television Awards	Best Comedian - Male	Vimal Kumar J	Won	
2024	Ananda Vikatan Television Awards	Best Director	V. Thiruselvam	Won	
2024	Ananda Vikatan Television Awards	Best Serial	Ethirneechal	Won	
2024	Ananda Vikatan Television Awards	Television Talk Of The Year	G. Marimuthu	Won	
2024	Ananda Vikatan Television Awards	Best Cinematography	Santhanam	Won	
2024	Galata Nakshatra Awards	Best Television Show	Ethirneechal	Won	
2025	Sun Kudumbam Viruthugal	Ninaivil Neengatha Kathapaathiram	G. Marimuthu	Won	
2025	Ananda Vikatan Television Awards	Best Screenplay	V. Thiruselvam	Won	
2025	Ananda Vikatan Television Awards	Best Supporting Actress	Priyadharshini	Won	
2026	Tamil Nadu State Television Awards	Best Television Show (2022)	Ethirneechal	Won	
2026	Tamil Nadu State Television Awards	Best Character Actress (2022)	Kaniha	Won	
2026	Tamil Nadu State Television Awards	Best Villain (2022)	G. Marimuthu	Won	
2026	Tamil Nadu State Television Awards	Best Dialogue Writer (2022)	Sri Vidhya	Won	

=== Season 2 ===
Year	Award (Note: Awards, festivals and organizations are in Alphabetical order.)	Category	Recipient(s)	Result	Ref.
2025	Sun Kudumbam Viruthugal	Thanga Mangaigal	Kaniha, Priyadharshini, Haripriya Isai, Parvathy Venkitaramanan	Won	
2026	Indian Awards Television	Most Popular Actress	Kaniha	Won	
2026	Indian Awards Television	Best Serial Of The Year	Ethirneechal Thodargiradhu	Won	

== Adaptations ==
Ethirneechal has been remade in other languages such as in Telugu, Malayalam, Kannada, Bengali and Marathi. It is broadcast on Sun TV Network's group of channels in the respective language.

Language	Title	Original release	Network(s)	Last aired	Notes	Ref.
Tamil	Ethirneechal எதிர்நீச்சல்	7 February 2022	Sun TV	8 June 2024	Original	
Tamil	Ethirneechal Thodargiradhu எதிர்நீச்சல் தொடர்கிறது	23 December 2024	Sun TV	Present	Original	
Telugu	Uppena ఉప్పెన	4 April 2022	Gemini TV	22 June 2024	Remake	
Malayalam	Kanalpoovu കനൽപൂവ്	24 July 2022	Surya TV	27 October 2024	Remake	
Kannada	Janani ಜನನಿ	15 August 2022	Udaya TV	27 October 2024	Remake	
Kannada	Bhagyavantharu ಭಾಗ್ಯವಂತರು	6 July 2026	Sun Udaya	Present	Remake	
Bengali	Alor Theekana আলোর ঠিকানা	19 September 2022	Sun Bangla	15 October 2023	Remake	
Marathi	Shabbas Sunbai शाब्बास सूनबाई	14 November 2022	Sun Marathi	15 July 2023	Remake	
