= Janet Vidhi =

Indian squash player (born 1995)

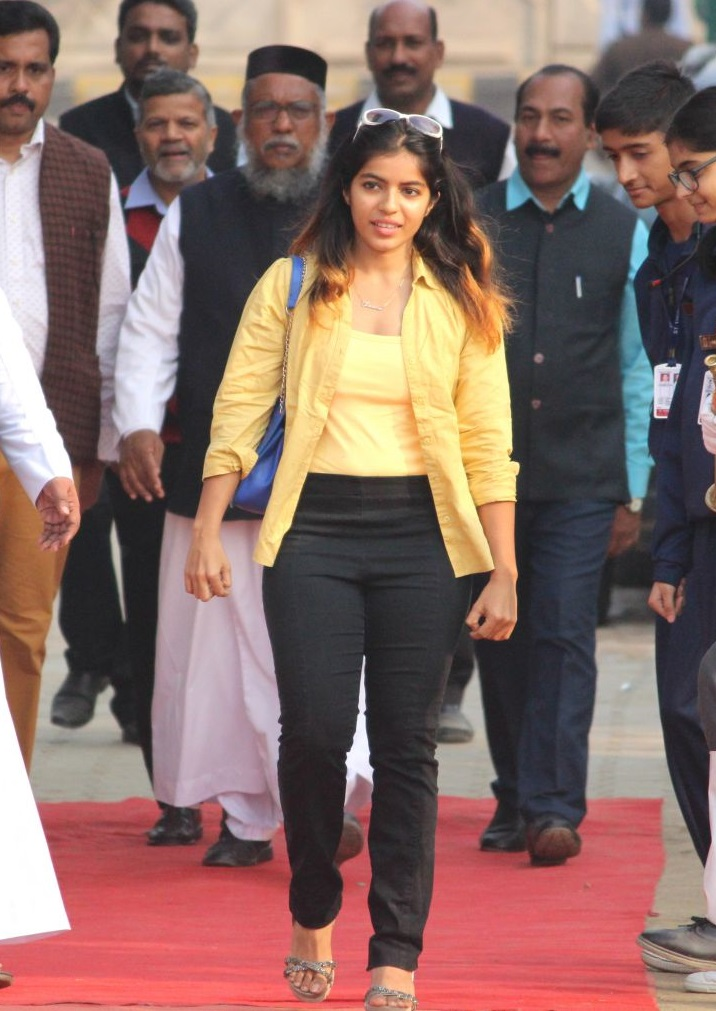

Personal information
- Full name: Janet Vidhi
- Born: 18 January 1995 (age 31) New Delhi, India
- Height: 1.56 m (5 ft 1 in)
- Weight: 55 kg (121 lb)
- Website: @janetvidhi

Sport
- Country: India
- Handedness: Left-handed
- Turned pro: 2014
- Coached by: Kamekish
- Retired: Active
- Racquet used: Technifiber carboflex

women's singles
- Highest ranking: 88 (April 2017)
- Current ranking: 195 (March 2020)
- Titles: Career Highlights and Awards: 9th Indian Woman in History to Enter World Top 100 Rankings, April 2017; India No. 3, November 2017; Played Semifinal in a PSA 5k tournament in Sarnia, Canada in November 2016; "Young Achiever Sport" Indo-Asean Award in 2018

Janet Vidhi (born 18 January 1995 in Delhi) is a professional squash player from India. She lives in Delhi. She is the 9th Indian woman squash player in history to enter the world top-100 rankings. She achieved her Best World Ranking of no. 88 (and consequently, India's No 3) as per the list issued by Professional Squash Association on 1 April 2017.

== Education and career overview ==
Janet won the title of ISP-Sprite All India Squash in 2009. Janet Vidhi of Delhi, who won the girls under-17 title with a four-game win over Pankhuri Malhotra. The sturdily built Janet dropped the third game and then doggedly fought to win the closely contested fourth to register a 11-9, 11-7, 8-11, 15-13 scoreline.

After studying from Air Force Bal Bharati School, She finished her graduation from University of Delhi in 2015. She is Squash professional since 2014.

She played Semifinal against Joshna Chinappa at the Senior Nationals in 2013

During her last tournament trip to Canada, she played semifinal at Sarnia from 15th to 19th Nov 2016. She played her best in the tournament. She won her first match of the main draw against Hannah Guthrie from Canada 11-4, 11-6, 11-5 (3-0). She played quarterfinal match with another Canadian player Paula Jenkins and defeated her with a score 11-8, 11-13, 14-12, 11-4 (3-1) to reach in Semi where she plays Emilia Soini (Finland). She was just two match away from PSA title. She lost to Emilia Soini.

She bagged the prestigious "Young Achiever Sport" Indo-Asean Award in 2018 which she received from External Affairs Minister Sushma Swaraj and Sports Minister Rajyavardhan Singh Rathore. She is a Full Time Professional Squash Player from India.

According to Janet Vidhi "Taking up sport professionally is one of the most challenging professions in India. When I joined professional circuit, there were maximum of 5 women from India but in March 2020 we have more than 30 women actively competing in professional squash circuit. I feel blessed to be able to inspire young girls from India." Also, she has shed light on the sport (Squash) during this interactive session with the children and the celebrity show host Mrs. NIDHI KUMAR conducted by Skoolz.
