= Priyamanaval =

Indian soap opera (2015-2019)

- Genre: Family; Romance
- Screenplay by: Amirthraj; Dialogues; Vasu Bharathi; Kavitha Bharathy
- Directed by: T.C. Bala Prasad (1-200); E. Vikramadithyan (201-1315)
- Starring: Praveena; Subhalekha Sudhakar; Mohammad Azeem; Haripriya Isai; Usha Elizabeth Suraj
- Theme music composer: Kiran
- Opening theme: "Priyamanaval"; Karthik (vocals); Yugabharathi (lyrics)
- Country of origin: India
- Original language: Tamil
- No. of episodes: 1315

Production
- Producer: Vikatan Televistas
- Cinematography: M.R. Saravana Kumar; S.Sakeethiya Seenu
- Camera setup: Multi-camera
- Running time: 21–25 minutes
- Production company: Vikatan Televistas

Original release
- Network: Sun TV
- Release: 19 January 2015 – 11 May 2019

Priyamanaval was an Indian Tamil-language soap opera starring Praveena and Subhalekha Sudhakar. It premiered on 19 January 2015 on Sun TV and ended on 11 May 2019. It was directed by E. Vikramadithyan and produced by Vikatan Televistas.

Usha Elizabeth Suraj played the negative role of Eshwari for about 800 episodes until 2017.

== Plot ==
Umayaal alias Uma is a Sri Lankan refugee marries her lover Krishnan alias Krishna, and together they become rich. Their married life is happy and they have four sons Natrajan "Natraj", Saravana Kumar "Saravanan", Dileepan "Dileepa", and Prabhakaran "Prabha". Uma and Krishnan alias Krishna have supported by Vaidyanathan alias Vaithi, Krishnan's maternal uncle's son. Vaidyanathan alias Vaithi disowned his parents after they tried to kill Krishna and Uma for their love, and he has been supporting both of them since then. Another supporter is Krishnan alias Krishna 's close friend Ayyavu, who with Krishnan alias Krishna starts a successful jewelry transport company with the help of Ayyavu's wife Eshwari.

Eshwari is not happy with having Krishna and Uma in partnership with the company and throws Krishnan alias Krishna out of the company. Uma gives Krishna her jewels and helps him start a new transport company named "UMAYAAL Alias UMA TRANSPORTS". Over time, Umayaal alias Uma Transports becomes successful and the couple grows rich. At the same time, Ayyavu faces loss and goes to jail, and his family become destitute. When Krishna learns of what has happened, he helps Ayyavu and offers him a job, working at Umayaal alias Uma Transports. He is highly loyal to Krishnan alias Krishna.

After 30 years of marriage, Umayaal alias Uma and Krishnan alias Krishna have a happy family, with their four adult sons - Natrajan "Natraj", Saravana Kumar "Saravana", Dileepan "Dileepa", and Prabhakaran "Prabha". Krishnan alias Krishna is now a local VIP and the couple are known for their generosity to the needy. Everyone respects them because of their impartiality towards the poor and rich. Umayaal alias Uma desires to lead a happy life with her four sons Natrajan "Natraj" and Saravanan "Saravana", Dileepan "Dileepa", and Prabhakaran "Prabha" and their wife's Avanthika, Bhoomika Kavitha, Swathi, and Isaipriya, and Uma and Krishnan's grandchildren Balachandran Maghizhni, Dwaraka.

Ayyavu, his brother ACP Rathnam and his daughter Sumathi are loyal and have a good friendship with Umayaal alias Uma family but Eshwari and their son Kannan are jealous of their wealth. Kannan plans to destroy their family and steal their assets. He is joined by Krishnan alias Krishna 's maternal uncle and his family who also seek revenge from them.

In the meantime,

Natrajan "Natraj" marries Avanthika

Saravana Kumar "Saravana" marries Bhoomika

Dileepan "Dileepa" marries Kavitha later Swathi

Prabhakaran "Prabha" marries Nandhini later Isaipriya alias Isai.

Just as they start to lead a happy married life, many challenges come across in life due to the torture given by Krishnan alias Krishna's uncle Vinayagm, his daughter Geetha, her husband DCP Giridharan alias Giri, Giri's brother Dharma etc. The family loses Kavitha who is killed by Dharma thus forcing Dileepan to a remarriage with another of his Kutti Mani 's maternal uncle's daughter Swathi. However, without losing hope, they win in their life, Climax scene Dharma is shot by Ulaganaayagi who goes to Jail 3 mathavkalukuppu pirkku

Natrajan "Natraj" & Avanthika son Balachandran

Dileepan "Dileepa" & Kavitha daughter named Dwaraka,

Prabhakaran "Prabha" & Isaipriya job in work happy ending.

== Cast ==
=== Main ===
- Praveena as Umayaal "Uma" Krishnan (Krishnan's wife, and Natraj, Saravanan, Dileepan and Prabhakaran mother)
  - Divya Ganesh as young Uma
- Subhalekha Sudhakar as Krishnan "Krishna" (Uma's husband, Ayyau's best friend, and Natraj, Saravanan, Dileepan and Prabhakaran father)
- VJ Vijay as Natrajan "Natraj" Krishnan (Krishnan and Uma's oldest son, Avanthika's husband and Balachandran's father)
- Sivaranjini Vijay as Avanthika Natrajan (Natraj's Wife, Balachandran's mother, Bhoomika's sister, Rajaram and Malliga's elder daughter)
- Dharish Jeyaseelan as Saravana Kumar "Saravanan" Krishnan (Uma and Krishnan Second son, Bhoomika's husband and Maghizhni's father)
- Kiran Mai as Bhoomika Saravana Kumar (Saravanan's wife, Maghizhni's mother, Avanthika's sister, Rajaram and Malliga's younger daughter)
- Vineeth Sundaram as Dileepan "Dileepa" Krishnan: (Uma and Krishnan's third son, Swathi's husband/ cousin, Kavitha's widower, Dwaraka's father)
- Niranjani Ashok / replaced by Navya Narayanan as Kavitha Dileepan: (Dileepan's first wife, niece) (dead)
- Abinavya Deepak as Swathi Dileepan: (Dileepan's 2nd wife, niece) / cousin (kuttimani and Radha's daughter)
- Mohammed Azeem / replaced by Karthik Vasudevan as Prabhakaran Krishnan (nicknamed Prabha or Prabhakar): Krishnan and Uma's youngest son, Isaipriya's cousin/husband
- Haripriya Isai as Isaipriya Prabhakaran (nicknamed Isai): Prabhakaran's wife and cousin

=== Supporting ===
- Preethi Kumar as Nandhini Rudramoorthy (Prabhakaran's ex-wife, Rudramoorthy's daughter, Vinayagam's niece) (dead)
- Hemanth Kumar as Kumar (Selvi's husband, Swarnam's stepson)
- Bhavana Mahadevappa as Tamilselvi (Selvi) Kumar (Kumar's wife, Kutti Mani and Radha's elder daughter, Swathi and Revathi's sister)
- V. Dasarathy as Kutti Mani aliasMani(Uma and Muthukumar's eldest brother, Radha's husband, Selvi, Swathi and Revathi's father)
- Seema as Revathi (Swathi and Selvi's sister, Kuttimani and Radha's younger daughter)
- Chandini Prakash as DSP Sasirekha IPS (Sasi) (Vinayagam daughter, Dileepan's ex-girlfriend)
- Venkat Subha as Vinayagam (Krishnan's uncle, Geetha, Vaithi's and Sasirekha's father) (dead)
- Ganesh /replaced by Ramnath as Rudramoorthy (Vinayagam's brother, Ram and Nandhini's father)
- Padhmini Saravanan /replaced by Agalaya Agal as Ulaganaayagi Vinayagam (Vinayagam's Wife, Geetha and Vaithi's mother)
- Meenakshi Muruha as Jaya Vinayagam (Vinayagam's second wife, Sasirekha's mother)
- VM Rajeshkannaa as Muthukumar alias Muthu (Isaipriya, Kathir and Isaikuyil's father, Uma and Kutti Mani's brother)
- Abishek Rathan as Kathirkaaman "Kathir" Muthu Kumar (Isaipriya and Isaikuyil's brother, Muthukumar's second son)
- Ultra Shree as Isaikuyil "kuyil" Muthu Kumar (Isai and Kathir's sister, Muthukumar's younger daughter)
- Parthan Siva as DCP Giridharan alias Giri (Geetha's husband, Vinayagam and Ulaganaayagi's son-in-law) (dead) & Dharmaraj alias Dharma (Giri's younger twin brother) (dead)
- Gowthami Vembunathan as Swarnam (Kumar's stepmother, Karpooram, Gowtham and Malar's mother)
- Sundar Annamalai as Karpooram (Kumar's stepbrother, Gowtham and Malar's elder brother, Swarnam's eldest son)
- Jayalakshmi as Thilaga Karpooram (Karpooram's wife, Priya's sister)
- Ameen Fakki as Gowtham (Kumar's stepbrother, Karpooram and Malar's brother, Swarnam's second son)
- Keerthi Vijay as Malar (Kumar's stepsister, Karpooram and Gowtham's younger sister, Swarnam's daughter)
- Vanitha Hariharan as Priya (Thilaga's sister)
- Giri Dwarakish as Vaithieeshwaran "Vaithi" (Vinayagam and Ulaganaayagi son, Geetha's Brother, Susila's husband)
- Nilani as Susila Vaithieeshwaran (Vaithi's wife)
- Krishna Kumar (Gunalan) as ACP Rathnam (Ayyavu's brother and Thenmozhi's husband)
- Caroline Hiltrud as Thenmozhi Rathnam (Rathnam's wife)
- VJ Sam as Kalaiselvan (Kalai) (Prabhakaran's friend)
- Rathnaraj as Chermadurai (Cherma) (Giri's ally)
- Sandhanalakshmi /replaced by Premalatha as Geetha Giridharan (Vinayagam and Ulaganaayagi daughter and Giridharan's wife) (dead)
- Harish G as Ramanathan (Ram) Rudramoorthy (Rudramoorthy's son, Vinayagam's nephew, Nandhini's brother)
- Narayanamurthy Deivanayagam as Subramaniam (Subbu) (Krishnan's former office staff) (dead)
- Egavalli as Sevandhi (Dharma's ally) (dead)
- Mahesh Subramaniam as Nirmal (Bhoomika's childhood friend)
- Usha Elizabeth Suraj /replaced by Babitha as Eshwari Ayyavu (Ayyavu's wife, Sumathi and Kannan's mother)
- Harish Adithya as Kannan Ayyavu (Ayyavu and Eshwari's son, Sumathi's brother) (dead)
- Veera Srinivasan (K. Veera) as Ayyavu (Krishnan's best friend, Eshwari's husband, Kannan and Sumathi's father, and Jambu's Father In Law) (dead)
- Uma Padmanabhan as Radha Mani (Kutti Mani's wife, Selvi, Swathi and Revathi's mother) (dead)
- Vishwanth as Jambulingeshwaran Jambu Manickavaasagam (Sumathi's husband, Ayyavu and Eshwari's son-in-law)
- Subbulakshmi as Sumathi Jambulingeshwaran (Jambu's wife, Kannan's sister, and Ayyavu and Eshwari's daughter)
- Ramki /replaced by KB Bala Subramani as Rajaram (Avanthika and Bhoomika's father, Malliga's husband)
- Balambiga as Malliga Rajaram (Rajaram's wife, Avanthika and Bhoomika's mother)
- Sathish Arunagiri as Sathish (dead)
- Tanuja Krishnappa as Valarmathi (Uma's friend)
- Karthick Chandra as ACP Kamalakannan (Rathnam's Replacement)
