= Tamil Nadu State Film Award for Best Choreographer =

Indian film award

The Tamil Nadu State Film Award for Best Choreographer is given by the state government as part of its annual Tamil Nadu State Film Awards for Tamil-language (Kollywood) films.

== Winners ==
Here is a list of the award recipients and the films for which they won.

Year	Choreographer	Film	Ref
1988	Mugur Sundar	Agni Natchathiram	
1989	D. K. S. Babu	Karagattakaran, Uthama Purushan	
1990	Mugur Sundar	Anjali	
1991	D. K. S. Babu	Chinna Thambi	
1992	Raghuram	Thevar Magan	
1993	Mugur Sundar	Gentleman	
1994	Raju Sundaram	Kaadhalan	
1995	B. H. Tharun Kumar	Muthu	
1996	K. Sivasankar	Poove Unakkaga	
1997	Lalitha-Mani	Pistha	
1998	Raju Sundaram	Jeans	
1999	Lawrence Raghavendra	Kannupada Poguthaiya	
2000	Brinda	Mugavaree	
2001	Chinni Prakash	Thavasi	
2002	Dinesh	King	
2003	Ashok Raja	Thirumalai	
2004	K. Sivasankar	Vishwa Thulasi	
2005	Kala	Chandramukhi	
2006	K. Sivasankar	Varalaru	
2007	Brinda	Deepavali	
2008	K. Sivasankar	Uliyin Osai	
2009	Dinesh	Yogi	
2010	Raju Sundaram	Paiyaa	
2011	Raghava Lawrence	Kanchana	
2012	Pandit Birju Maharaj	Vishwaroopam	
2013	Shobi Paulraj	Pandiya Naadu	
2014	Gayathri Raghuram	Nimirndhu Nil	
2015	Brinda	Thani Oruvan	

== See also ==
- Tamil cinema
- Cinema of India
