= Bansuri: The Flute =

- poster
- Directed by: Hari Viswanath
- Based on: Vanavillin Ambbu by Augusto
- Produced by: Mou Roychowdhury
- Starring: Anurag Kashyap; Rituparna Sengupta; Upendra Limaye
- Cinematography: Grzegorz Hartfiel
- Edited by: Sreekar Prasad
- Music by: Debojyoti Mishra
- Production companies: Vision 3 Global Pvt Ltd; HarryToonz Studio
- Release date: 16 April 2021
- Country: India
- Language: Hindi

Bansuri: The Flute is a 2021 Indian Hindi-language drama film written and directed by Hari Viswanath. Produced by Mou Roychowdhury, the film stars Anurag Kashyap, Rituparna Sengupta and Upendra Limaye in major roles.

The film began principal photography on 25 May 2019 and the first look poster was launched by Kashyap on his Instagram page. The film was released theatrically on 16 April 2021 in India.

== Summary ==
The film is based on a boy, who discovers what is running in his blood, after playing a violin, gets inspired and tries to excel like his father.

== Cast ==
- Anurag Kashyap as Sadashiv
- Rituparna Sengupta as Sapna
- Upendra Limaye as Maan Singh
- Danish Husain as Albert Rozario
- Masood Akhtar as Heeralal Mishra
- Meher Mistry as Mala
- Master Ankan Mallick as Madan
- Master Deepro Sen as David Rozario

== Production ==
After the award-winning film Radiopetti, director Hari Viswanath decided to make his second feature film after he had several casual talk with few members who were a part of 2015 Indian Panorama section of IFFI, Goa. Rituparna Sengupta was chosen to play the protagonist, a single mother. A meeting with Anurag Kashyap led to his casting as the leading man along with National award-winning actor Upendra Limaye. Actors Masood Akhtar and Danish Hussain were also signed to play other important roles.

Official filming started by the end of May 2019 and continued till end of June 2019. The film was shot entirely in dooars area of West Bengal like Aibheel, Chalsa, Jalpaiguri and Mateli with support from Goodricke tea estate. Veteran Sreekar Prasad and Tapas Nayak joined the film as editor and sound designer respectively. Debojyoti Mishra composed two songs for the lyrics written by Anupam Banerjee. While Papon was a singer for one, Anweshaa sung the second song. Production designing was taken care by Jayashree lakshminarayan and Polish cinematographer Grzegorz Hartfiel was signed as the cameraman of the film.

== See also ==
- Bansuri, an ancient side-blown bamboo flute
