= Nivas Adithan =

Indian actor

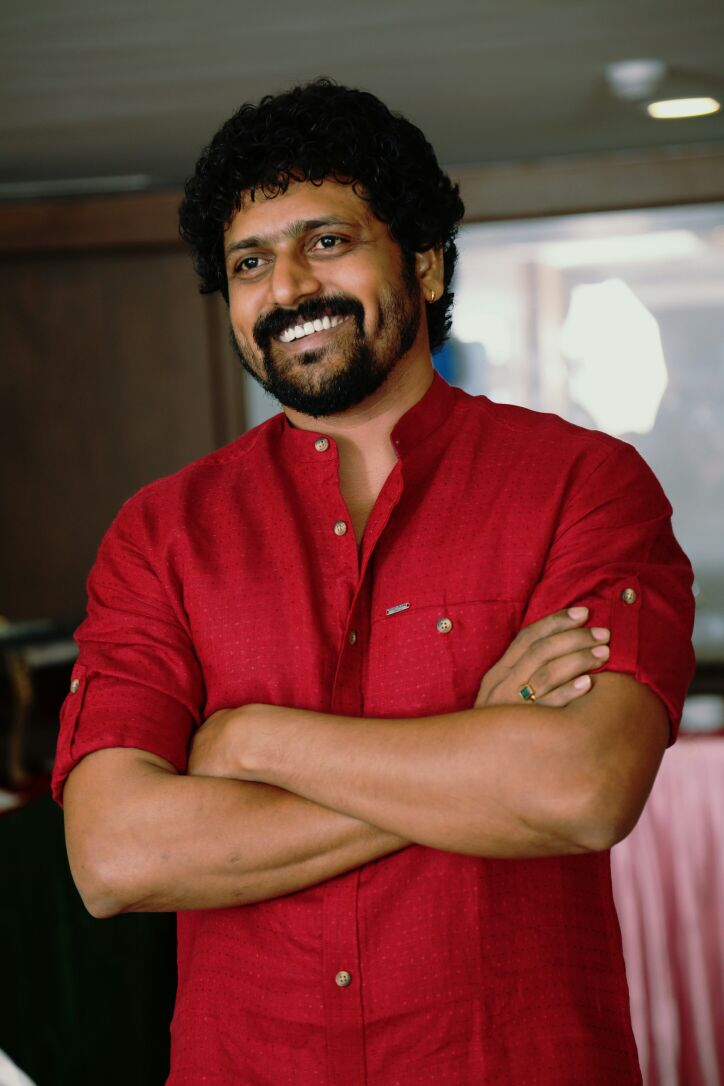
- Born: Karaikal, Puducherry, India
- Occupation: Actor
- Years active: 2012-present
- Father: Adithan

Nivas Adithan is an Indian actor who has appeared in Tamil language films and TV shows. He has played notable roles in Naanga, Taramani, Kaaka Muttai and Radiopetti.

== Early life ==
Nivas Adithan was born in Karaikal, Puducherry, India, into a family with a background in the film industry; his father, Adithan, was an actor in films such as Thaayum Magalum (1965) and a producer. He worked at Reliance Petrochemicals in Jamnagar, Gujarat.

== Career ==
Nivas was recommended into acting roles by choreographer Kala Master after a performance on the dance show Maanada Mayilada in 2010. He subsequently made his acting debut in Tamil cinema in Selva's Naanga, playing one of the lead roles.

In 2015, he appeared in the critically acclaimed Kaaka Muttai (The Crow's Egg). He also played a supporting role in Radiopetti.

== Filmography ==
=== Films ===
Year	Title	Role	Notes and Ref.
2012	Naanga	Mani	
2013	Thanga Meenkal		
2015	Kaaka Muttai	The children's father	
2015	Radiopetti	Saravanan	
2017	Paambhu Sattai		
2017	Sangili Bungili Kadhava Thorae	Sangli's son	
2017	Taramani	Jacob	
2019	Chithiram Pesuthadi 2	Mani	
2019	Jada	Opponent team leader	
2020	Yaadhumagi Nindraai	Ganesh	
2020	Ka Pae Ranasingam	Factory owner	
2022	Thattassery Koottam	Balasingham	Malayalam film
2023	Regina	Driver	
2023	Locker	Chakravarthy	
2025	Niram Marum Ulagil	Raayappan's son	
2025	Siragu	Father	
2025	Game of Loans	Daniel	
2026	Vaa Vaathiyaar	Nivas Adithan	

=== Television ===
Year	Title	Role	Notes	Ref.
2010	Maanada Mayilada	Contestant		
2025–present	Dhanam	Pugazhendhi		

=== Short films ===
Year	Title	Directed By	Notes	Ref.
2022	Kumaresan Collector	Nivas Adithan	Won several awards in short film festivals.	
