= Maanada Mayilada =

Television series

- Genre: Reality competition
- Directed by: Kala
- Presented by: Sanjeev; Keerthi Shanthanu
- Country of origin: India
- Original language: Tamil
- No. of seasons: 10

Original release
- Network: Kalaignar TV
- Release: 2007 – 2015

Maanada Mayilada is an Indian dance competition show airing from 2007 till 2015 on Kalaignar TV. The show was conceived, produced and directed by noted choreographer Kala Master. She is also one of the judges and the only constant judge throughout the show. Other judges have been Brinda, Khushbu, Rambha, Namitha, Simran, Mumtaj, Sudha Chandran, Meena. Prashanth and Srikanth. Sanjeev and Kiki Vijay have been the hosts for all seasons.

The choreographers for this dance show include Prem Master, Anthony Master, Rajesh Master, RameklkMaster, Chandru Master, Raghu Master, Sandy, Mani Master, Tamil Master, Bala Master, Nantha. Maanada Mayilada has alternative choreographers and sometimes the choreographers help each other during the seasons.

== Series overview ==
Season	Season premiere date	Season finale date	Winner	1st runner up	2nd runner up	3rd runner up
1			Sathish Krishnan & Jayashree	Raaghav & Preetha	Rajkant & Bhavana	None
2			Bala & Priyadharshini Neelakandan	Ganeshkar & Aarthi	Lokesh & Sujibala	None
3			Ranjith & Aishwarya Rajesh	Fayaz & Darshini	Azhar & Rajini	None
4		5 February 2010	Gokul & Neepa	Nivas Adithan & Kirithika	Lokesh & Swetha	None
5	21 February 2010	22 October 2010	Bala & Swetha	Rehman & Shivani	Kiran & Leelavathi	None
6			Sathya & Monica	Asif & Bhavana	Karthik & Soundarya	None
7		8 September 2012	Bobby & Swarna Thomas	Sujith & Ankitha	Puviarasu & Anusha	None
8	21 October 2012	6 July 2013	Asif & Monisha	Bhushan & Ramya	Rajesh & Meghna	None
9			Sathish and Ankitha Nayana	Fayaz and Nikitha	Surya and Remya	None
10			Ravi Phoenix and Ramya Kalathil	Karthik and Shalini	Vasanth and Pavithra Lakshmi	Ragis and Isaline

== Season 1 ==
The judges were originally Kala Master, Brindha Master, and Simran. Simran was replaced during the season with Namitha.

The Season 1 contestants were Sathish Krishnan and Jayashree (sdp) (reel couple), Raaghav and Preetha (real couple), Rajkanth and Bhavana, George and Sujibala, Rajkumar and Archana, Nitish and Swetha, Golden Suresh and Gaya.

The prizes for Season 1 were given away by actor Surya at the awarding ceremony held at Nehru Indoor Stadium, Chennai. The winning couple was trained by Sandy.

== Season 2 ==
The judges were Kala Master, Khushbu and Rambha.

The Season 2 contestants were Ranjith and Aishwarya, Lokesh and Sujibala, Bala and Priyadharshini Neelakandan (popular TV anchor and interviewer), Karthik and Neepa, Gokul and Kavi, Aakash and Shruthi, Ganeshkar and Aarthi (real life couple), Sai Prashanth and Swetha, Shakthi and Yoginee(famous television personality), Madhan and Priyanka. Later Rekha, Sureshwar and Madhu.

The prizes were given away by actor Vijay at the awarding ceremony at Nehru Indoor Stadium, Chennai.

== Season 3 ==
The judges were Kala Master, Rambha and Kushboo Sundar.

The Season 3 contestants were Fayaz and Dharshini, Azhar and Rajini, Ranjith and Aishwarya, Chaitanya and Raghavi, Nivas Adithan and Kirthika, Ashwanth and Suguna, Murali and Nisha (real couple), Raghava and Swetha, Ram and Priya, Ajay and Rekha, Arun and Apsara.

The prizes for Season 3 were given by actress Shriya Saran at Nehru Indoor Stadium.

== Season 4 ==
The judges for this season were Kala Master, Khushbu and Namitha.

The Season 4 contestants were Gokul and Neepa, Lokesh and Swetha, Nivas Adithan and Kirithika, Kiran and Pooja, Mahesh and Priyadharshini, Yuvraaj and Deepa, Rehman and Nikisha, Karthik and Soundharya, Kumaran and Apsara, Kiran and Sridevi.

The entertainers for this season were Prem Master, Mano and Sukumar.

In this season the format in choosing winners was changes. 50% judges marks and 50% votes were to be taken into consideration in declaring the winners for Season 4.

The finale took place on 5 February 2010 at Nehru Indoor Stadium, Chennai. The finale was attended by the chief minister of Tamil Nadu, Rambha, Raghuram, Devayani, Sripriya while the awards were given by Silambarasan.

== Season 5 ==
The fifth season began 21 February 2010 on Kalaignar TV. This season the first prize is a house, sponsored by Anugraha Integrated Township near Pondicherry.

The judges were Brindha Master, Kushboo, Rambha and Namitha.

The contestants were Azhar and Jennifer (choreographer Ramesh), Madhan and Pooja (choreographer Bala), Kumaran Thangarajan and Suhashini Raju (choreographer Anthony), Fayaz and Varsha (choreographer Anthony), Rehman and Shivani (choreographer Rajesh), Kiran and Leelavathi (choreographer Prem), Bala and Swetha (choreographer Sandy), Karthick and Pooja (choreographer Chandru)

The entertainers for this season were Gokul and Artist Tamizh.

Highlights of this season: Kala Master would longer be judging this show; she will just be a special judge in giving her comments, For the first time in any Indian reality show, one choreographer is going to take on two pairs, and Kala Master announced that there would be no eliminations until the semi-finals. This season cash prizes are given to audience members who watch the show regularly through Kalaignar TV.

At 150th week a major surprise came as the replacing judge of Rambha is Kushboo, because at that time Rambha was pregnant and married, so Kala Master decided to give her rest and welcome back Kushboo as a permanent judge.

The Season 5 prizes were given by Prabhu Deva and Nayantara. The awards ceremony was held in Abu Dhabi. The grand finale took place on 22 October 2010.

The Sandy got a cash amount as his pair Bala and Swetha won the 1st prize.

== Season 6 ==
The judges for this season were Kala Master, Mumtaj and Sudha Chandran.

== Season 7 ==
The judges for this season were Kala Master, Kushboo Sundar and Namitha

The Season 7 contestants were Bobby and Swarna, Puviarasu and Anusha, Raja and Anandhi, Sujith and Ankitha, Surya and Shivani, Deepak and Monisha, Aravind and swathisha ( pon Swathi ), and Suresh and Misha.

Kristen Rudisill was a guest performer on the celebration round.

The entertainers for this season were Gokul, choreographer Tamizh

The Season 7 prizes were given by Jayam Ravi and Aarthi. The awards ceremony was held in Stadium Melawati Shah Alam, Malaysia. The grand finale took place on 8 September 2012. The choreographer Anthony got a cash amount Best Choreographer as his pair Bobby and Swarna won the 1st prize.

== Season 8 ==
The judges for this season were kala master kushboo and prashanth

The Season 8 contestants were Asif and Monisha, Bhushan and Ramya, Santosh and Seetha, Rajesh and Meghna, Arjun and Akshaya, Raja and Rema, Aravind and Krithika(replaced by Anusha season 7 contestant), Vickey and hema (Malaysia Contestant), Rishi basatwar and minakshi.

The entertainers for this season were Gokul (Goksu); Winner of season 7 Bobby (Boksu) and Zozo.
