= Brinda Master =

Indian choreographer and filmmaker

- Born: Brinda Gopal; Erode, Tamil Nadu, India
- Occupations: Choreographer; director
- Years active: 1987–present
- Relatives: Kala (sister); Raghuram (brother-in-law); Gayathri Raguram (niece); Prasanna Sujit (nephew); Keerthi Shanthanu (niece)

Brinda Gopal, known professionally as Brinda Master, is an Indian dance choreographer and director who primarily works in South Indian cinema. She has choreographed dance sequences for various Indian films. She has won one National Film Award for Best Choreography, Tamil Nadu State Film Award for Best Choreographer, twice and Kerala State Film Award for Best Choreography, four times.

== Early life ==
Brinda Gopal was born into a family of seven girls to Mani Iyer, a caterer, and a homemaker in Erode. An elder sister Jayanthi, first started dancing and acted as heroine in two films – Uthiripookkal and Poottatha Pookkal. Brindha's second sister Girija, learned Bharatanatyam at Kalakshetra; and went to work with choreographers Thangam and later Raghuram Master, whom she married later, and also become an independent choreographer. Kala, a leading choreographer, is her elder sister.

One of her nephews, Prasanna Sujit, is also a film choreographer. One of her niece Gayathri Raghuram, daughter of late Raghuram Master and her sister Girija is also a choreographer and an actress. She has also introduced her another niece Keerthi, daughter of Jayanthi Master and wife of actor Shanthanu Baghyaraj, as an anchor in her dance reality show Maanada Mayilada.

== Career ==
Through the Bollywood film Insaf Ki Pukar she started her career as an assistant choreographer in 1987.She became independent choreographer with the 2000 Tamil film Mugavaree which features Ajith Kumar and Jyothika in lead roles. She was awarded the 'Tamil Nadu State Film Award for Best Choreographer by the state government at Tamil Nadu State Film Awards in 2000 for her work for that film.

== Selected filmography ==
Key
†	Denotes films that have not yet been released

As choreographer
Years	Title	Language	Notes	Ref.
1987	Insaf Ki Pukar	Hindi	Assistant choreographer	
1988	Aakhari Poratam	Telugu	Assistant choreographer	
1988	Janaki Ramudu	Telugu	Assistant choreographer	
1989	Prem Pratigyaa	Hindi	Assistant choreographer	
1991	Phool Aur Kaante	Hindi	Assistant choreographer	
1993	Jaagruti	Hindi	Assistant choreographer	
1997	Arunachalam	Tamil		
1997	Preminchukundam Raa	Telugu		
1998	Daya	Malayalam		
1999	Naanu Nanna Hendthiru	Kannada		
1999	Minsara Kanna	Tamil		
2000	Mugavaree	Tamil		
2003	Kaakha Kaakha	Tamil		
2004	Madurey	Tamil		
2005	Chandramukhi	Tamil		
2005	Udayananu Tharam	Malayalam		
2006	Aathi	Tamil		
2006	Sillunu Oru Kaadhal	Tamil		
2007	Deepavali	Tamil		
2007	Sivaji: The Boss	Tamil		
2007	Azhagiya Tamil Magan	Tamil		
2007	Vinodayathra	Malayalam		
2008	Calcutta News	Malayalam		
2008	Dasavathaaram	Tamil		
2008	Vaaranam Aayiram	Tamil		
2011	Engeyum Kadhal	Tamil		
2011	Velayudham	Tamil		
2013	Kadal	Tamil		
2013	Thalaivaa	Tamil		
2013	Bullett Raja	Hindi		
2014	Maan Karate	Tamil		
2014	PK	Hindi		
2015	Kaaki Sattai	Tamil		
2016	Rajinimurugan	Tamil		
2016	Remo	Tamil		
2017	Kaatru Veliyidai	Tamil		
2018	Kaala	Tamil		
2018	Sarkar	Tamil		
2019	Nerkonda Paarvai	Tamil		
2020	Darbar	Tamil		
2021	Sulthan	Tamil		
2021	Marakkar: Lion of the Arabian Sea	Malayalam		
2021	Annaatthe	Tamil		
2022	Don	Tamil		
2022	Ponniyin Selvan: I	Tamil		
2023	Ponniyin Selvan: II	Tamil		
2025	Thug Life	Tamil	Co-choreographer	
2026	Nari Nari Naduma Murari	Telugu		

As Actress
Year	Title	Role
1994	Nammavar	Nirmala

As director
Year	Title	Notes
2022	Hey Sinamika	Also choreographer
2023	Thugs	Also choreographer

Music Video
Years	Songs	Works	Notes
2022	"Gandhari"	Director & Choreographer	Music Video

== Awards and honours ==
Year	Award category	Winner	Ref.
1997	Filmfare Award for Best Choreography – South	Preminchukundam Raa	
1998	National Film Award for Best Choreography	Daya	
2000	Tamil Nadu State Film Award for Best Choreographer	Mugavaree	
2003	Filmfare Award for Best Choreography – South	Kaakha Kaakha	
2005	Kerala State Film Award for Best Choreography	Udayananu Tharam	
2007	Tamil Nadu State Film Award for Best Choreographer	Deepavali	
2007	Kerala State Film Award for Best Choreography	Vinodayathra	
2008	Kerala State Film Award for Best Choreography	Calcutta News	
2017	Vijay Award for Best Choreographer	Kaatru Veliyidai	
2021	Kerala State Film Award for Best Choreography	Marakkar: Arabikadalinte Simham	

== See also ==
- Indian women in dance
