= Kuzhanthaigal Munnetra Kazhagam =

2025 Tamil film by Shankar Dayal

- Theatrical release poster
- Directed by: Shankar Dayal
- Written by: Shankar Dayal
- Produced by: Arunkumar Sammantham; Shankar Dayal
- Starring: Yogi Babu; Senthil
- Cinematography: J. Laxman Kumar
- Edited by: Richard Kevin
- Music by: Saadhaga Paravaigal
- Production company: Meenakshi Amman Movies
- Distributed by: S Films Corporation
- Release date: 24 January 2025
- Running time: 119 minutes
- Country: India
- Language: Tamil

Kuzhanthaigal Munnetra Kazhagam (transl. Children's progressive federation) is a 2025 Indian Tamil-language political satire film written, directed and produced by Shankar Dayal (Note: Posthumous release) along with Arunkumar Sammantham under Meenakshi Amman Movies banner. The film stars Yogi Babu and Senthil in the lead roles in their maiden collaboration, alongside Imayavarman, Advaith Jai Masthaan, Subbu Panchu, Saravanan, Lizzie Antony, Chitra Lakshmanan, Mayilsamy and others in pivotal roles.

Kuzhanthaigal Munnetra Kazhagam released in theatres on 24 January 2025.

== Cast ==
- Yogi Babu as Aathimoolam
- Senthil
- Imayavarman
- Advaith Jai Masthaan
- Harika Peddada
- Bhavas
- Subbu Panchu as Chanakya
- Saravanan
- Lizzie Antony
- Chitra Lakshmanan
- Mayilsamy
- Pichaikkaran Moorthy
- Sonia
- Ashvin Raja

== Production ==
On 25 March 2024, Yogi Babu announced his next project titled Kuzhanthaigal Munnetra Kazhagam in the lead role as a politician to be written and directed by Shankar Dayal who previously directed Saguni (2012). The film features Senthil in an important role in his maiden collaboration with Yogi Babu, alongside Lizzie Antony, Saravanan, Subbu Panchu, Chitra Lakshmanan, Mayilsamy and others in pivotal roles.

The technical front includes the cinematographer J. Laxman Kumar, editor Richard Kevin and Sankar's band Saadhaga Paravaigal (SPS) in their feature film debut as music composers. On 19 December 2024, Shankar Dayal died after suffering a heart attack in the press meet stage, making his final film.

== Music ==
Kuzhanthaigal Munnetra Kazhagam

Soundtrack album by Saadhaga Paravaigal Sankar
- Released: 7 January 2025
- Genre: Feature film soundtrack
- Length: 15:24
- Language: Tamil
- Label: Zee Music
- Producer: Saadhaga Paravaigal Sankar

Singles from Kuzhanthaigal Munnetra Kazhagam
- 1. "Politics Therlana Bommeru" Released: 6 December 2024; 2. "Frienda Pola" Released: 27 December 2024

External audio
- Kuzhanthaigal Munnetra Kazhagam - Full Album on YouTube

The soundtrack is composed by Sankar's band Saadhaga Paravaigal. The first single "Politics Therlana Bommeru" sung by G. V. Prakash Kumar released on 6 December 2024. The second single "Frienda Pola" released on 27 December 2024. The entire album consisting of four songs was released on 7 January 2025.

All tracks are written by Shankar Dayal.

Track listing
No.	Title	Singer(s)	Length
1.	"Frienda Pola"	Junior Nithya, Saadhaga Paravaigal Shankar	3:54
2.	"Politics Therlana Bommeru"	G. V. Prakash Kumar	3:15
3.	"Nadaiyo Mella Mella"	Priyanka. N	3:56
4.	"Kumba Kumba"	Manasi	4:19
Total length:			15:24

== Release ==
=== Theatrical ===
Kuzhanthaigal Munnetra Kazhagam released in theatres on 24 January 2025.

=== Home media ===
The film began streaming on Aha from 7 March 2025.

== Reception ==
Virakesari rated the film two out of five. Sreejith Mullappilly of Cinema Express rated it one point five out of five and stated, "The kids do a decent job of playing characters with some arcs of their own, but their portions go on for too long, depriving the film of any momentum."
