= Parasuram (2003 film) =

- Poster
- Directed by: Arjun
- Written by: K. C. Thangam, Shankar Dayal (dialogues)
- Story by: Shanmugapriyan (base story), Arjun
- Produced by: K. Prabakaran
- Starring: Arjun; Abbas; Kiran Rathod; Gayathri Raghuram; Goundamani; Rahul Dev
- Cinematography: K. S. Selvaraj
- Edited by: P. Sai Suresh
- Music by: A. R. Rahman (Songs); Pravin Mani (Background Score)
- Production company: Anbalaya Films
- Release date: 30 May 2003
- Running time: 155 minutes
- Country: India
- Language: Tamil

Parasuram (/pərəsurɑːm/) is a 2003 Indian Tamil-language action film written and directed by Arjun. It stars himself in the lead role alongside Abbas, Kiran Rathod and Gayathri Raguram. The music was composed by A. R. Rahman.

== Plot ==
A case is entrusted to Assistant Police Commissioner Parasuram, a patriotic officer tough as a nail. His ladylove is Meena. He locks horns with Akash, who sends misguided youths to Pakistan for training and brings them back to subvert the peaceful state. Akash's identity is a secret, while Shiva pops in as Naghulan's brother and gives a speech against terrorism. Meena is a petty thief who has a soft corner on Parasuram. The rest of the story is all about how Parasuram nails the bad guys with excessive blood spewing.

== Cast ==
- Arjun as ACP Parasuram IPS
- Abbas as Shiva
- Kiran Rathod as Anjali
- Gayathri Raguram as Meena
- Goundamani as Sub Inspector Thangaraj
- Rahul Dev as Akash / Sankaran Kutty
- Rajesh as Director General of Police
- Shyam Ganesh as Naghulan, Shiva's elder brother
- Vennira Aadai Moorthy as Anjali's father
- Vaiyapuri as Anjali's uncle
- Ramji as Master
- Mansoor Ali Khan as Home Minister Vishwanathan
- Rajyalakshmi as ACP Parasuram's mother
- Charuhasan as Judge
- Vinu Chakravarthy as Kader Mohammed
- Indhu as Indira
- Vijay Krishnaraj as Police Inspector
- Mohan Vaidya
- Baburaj

== Production ==
The film was initially launched under the title Ashoka with Shaji Kailas as director and Samyuktha Varma as the lead actress alongside Arjun. Later both Shaji and Samyuktha opted out from the film due to creative differences with Arjun, with the latter himself taking over direction. The film was dubbed in Telugu as Police Karthavyam in June 2003.

== Soundtrack ==
The songs were composed by A. R. Rahman. The background score was composed by Pravin Mani.

Song	Singer(s)	Duration	Lyrics
"Dolna Dolna"	Hariharan and Sujatha Mohan	5:25	Pa. Vijay
"Kadhal Vettukili"	Karthik and Sadhana Sargam	5:58	Kabilan
"Chittukuruvi"	Swarnalatha, Arjun and Sriram Parthasarathy	5:48	Palani Bharathi
"Muppadhu Nimidam"	Unnikrishnan and Sujatha Mohan	4:32	Kabilan
"Jack And Jill"	Surjo Bhattacharya, Nithyasree Mahadevan and Mathangi	5:57	Palani Bharathi

== Reception ==
Sify criticised the lack of coherence in the script and wrote, "It is better if Arjun can invest his time and talent in something that is not as bad as Parasuram". The Hindu wrote, "Writer-director Arjun's intentions are noble. It is the execution that falters, especially in the last leg — for about three quarters of an hour before it is curtains". Chennai Online wrote "It's yet another 'patriotic' film, with a liberal dose of action from Arjun who doubles as director and hero. By now we know what Arjun is all about. An enviably maintained physique, a penchant for action scenes, and undisguised patriotic fervour. All this is re-established here. It's only the script that needed sprucing up".
