= Mugavaree =

2000 film by V. Z. Durai

- Theatrical release poster
- Directed by: V. Z. Durai
- Written by: Balakumaran (Dialogue)
- Screenplay by: V. Z. Durai
- Story by: V. Z. Durai
- Produced by: S. S. Chakravarthy; S. N. Raja
- Starring: Ajith Kumar; Jyothika
- Cinematography: P. C. Sreeram
- Edited by: Suresh Urs
- Music by: Deva
- Production company: NIC Arts
- Release date: 19 February 2000
- Running time: 156 minutes
- Country: India
- Language: Tamil

Mugavaree (transl. Identity/Address) is a 2000 Indian Tamil-language coming-of-age romantic drama film written and directed by V. Z. Durai (in his directoral debut) and produced by S. S. Chakravarthy. The film stars Ajith Kumar and Jyothika in the lead roles, with Raghuvaran, Vivek, Manivannan, and K. Viswanath in supporting roles. It revolves around the conflicting emotions of ambition, love and responsibility that a man goes through in his quest to become a successful music composer.

The music is composed by Deva, song lyrics were written by Vairamuthu, and cinematography was handled by P. C. Sreeram. Mugavaree released on 19 February 2000 and became a commercial success, winning two Tamil Nadu State Film Awards: Best Family Film and Best Choreographer (Brinda).

== Plot ==
Sridhar is from a middle-class family headed by his father. Shiva is Sridhar's elder brother and the breadwinner for the family, consisting of his wife Shantha and sister. Sridhar, upon completion of his graduation, aspires to become a music composer and tries hard to secure a chance in movies, but all his efforts go in vain. Sridhar's search for a chance continues for eight years. Despite that, his family members support him very well and encourage him whenever he feels dejected.

Sridhar meets and befriends Viji Chandrasekhar. Viji also likes Sridhar and his aspiration. Slowly, love blossoms between them. Viji gets introduced to Sridhar's family, and they too like her. However, Sridhar has plans of marrying her only after getting his first break in music. Viji also understands Sridhar and supports him. A CD shop owner is Sridhar's neighbour, and he also encourages him. Sridhar gets an opportunity to compose music for a film. He feels extremely happy and goes for recording. However, on the same day, the producer meets with an accident, and as he considers it an inauspicious sign, the film is dropped.

Viji's younger sister Sudha gets a good marriage alliance, but the groom's family finds it odd upon seeing Viji being unmarried. Viji's father requests Sridhar and Viji to get married so that it does not stop his younger daughter's wedding proposal. Viji's father asks Sridhar to leave away his dream of becoming a music composer as he has been already trying hard for years. He also offers him a job so that he can marry Viji.

However, Sridhar refuses to let go his dream. He is ready to sacrifice his love for the sake of his ambition. He requests Viji to marry someone else as he cannot give up his passion for music. One day, Shiva has a heart attack and is admitted to the hospital. The doctors say that Shiva has heart problems and needs rest. Sridhar is shocked to see his brother's condition. As Shiva was the only income earner in the family, now Shantha and Preitha decide to take up some jobs to help earn money for the family.

Sridhar worries seeing that, though he also feels proud about the love and affection shown by his family members towards him, as no one asked him to forego his ambition and take up some job despite this condition. However, Sridhar decides to go for a job so he could ease his family's financial burden. He informs this to the CD shop owner and leaves for an interview, giving up his ambition. A few years later, Sridhar secures a chance to compose music, becomes a leading music composer and marries Viji.

== Cast ==
- Ajith Kumar as Sridhar Pandian
- Jyothika as Viji Chandrasekhar
- Raghuvaran as Shiva Pandian
- K. Viswanath as Vijay Pandian, Sridhar's father
- Sithara as Shantha
- Vivek as Ramesh
- Manivannan as the CD Shop Owner
- Jai Ganesh as Chandrasekhar
- Fathima Babu as Viji's mother
- Suchindra as Durai (guest appearance)
- Nizhalgal Ravi as Dhurai's father
- Preetha as Sridhar's sister
- Soumya as Sudha
- Rajeev as Shiva's friend
- Cochin Hanifa as Music Director
- Ponnambalam as Muthupandi
- Mohan Raman as Shiva's boss
- Santhana Bharathi as RK Ram
- Sethu Vinayagam as Cinema Producer
- S. Kavitha as Viji's friend
- Halwa Vasu
- Scissor Manohar
- Chaplin Balu
- Chelladurai
- Master Mahendran as a child on the beach
- Kanal Kannan (special appearance)

== Production ==
The film director, V. Z. Durai, revealed that he had approached S. S. Chakravarthy to make the film with Ajith Kumar after failing to get noticed for a long period, getting rejected by four producers for the script. Chakravarthy was supportive and maintained a close link with the film from shoot till post-production.

== Soundtrack ==
The soundtrack was composed by Deva, with lyrics written by Vairamuthu. The song "Oh Nenje" is based on "Get Down (You're the One for Me)" by Backstreet Boys, "Poo Virinjachu" is based on "That Thing You Do!" from the film of the same name, and "Keechu Kiliye" is based on "Enemies" by Dr. Alban. Chennai Online wrote "The album seems to have been targeted at the youth and it can be said that Deva has succeeded in his endeavour" while calling the song "Keechu Kiliye" sung by Hariharan as "the best song of the album".

Track listing
No.	Title	Singer(s)	Length
1.	"Oh Nenje"	Hariharan, Swarnalatha	5:54
2.	"Poo Virinjachu"	P. Unnikrishnan, Anuradha Sriram	5:48
3.	"Keechu Kiliye" (Female)	Harini, Chorus	6:22
4.	"Yeh Nilave"	Unni Menon	4:13
5.	"Aandae Nootrandae"	Naveen	7:14
6.	"Keechu Kiliye" (Male)	Hariharan, Chorus	6:22
Total length:			35:53

== Release and reception ==
Mugavaree released on 19 February 2000. Shobha Warrier of Rediff.com gave the film a positive review citing that the real "winners" are "Ajith, the actor, and P. C. Sriram, the cinematographer". The critic claimed that Ajith Kumar "brilliantly portrays the vulnerable and sad Sridhar". Malathi Rangarajan of The Hindu wrote, "Strong theme, reasonably appealing treatment, appreciable acting and aesthetic camera work are the positive features" of the film.

The initial climax showed the character of Sridhar facing another roadblock on his journey towards becoming a music composer. Post-release, the climax was changed following public demand, showing a more favourable situation for Sridhar. Reviewing this version, Krishna Chidambaram of Kalki praised the sensibly written scenes and dialogues but panned the new climax. The film won the second prize for Tamil Nadu State Film Award for Second Best Family Film, whilst Brinda won for Best Choreographer.
