= Hari Viswanath =

Indian film director

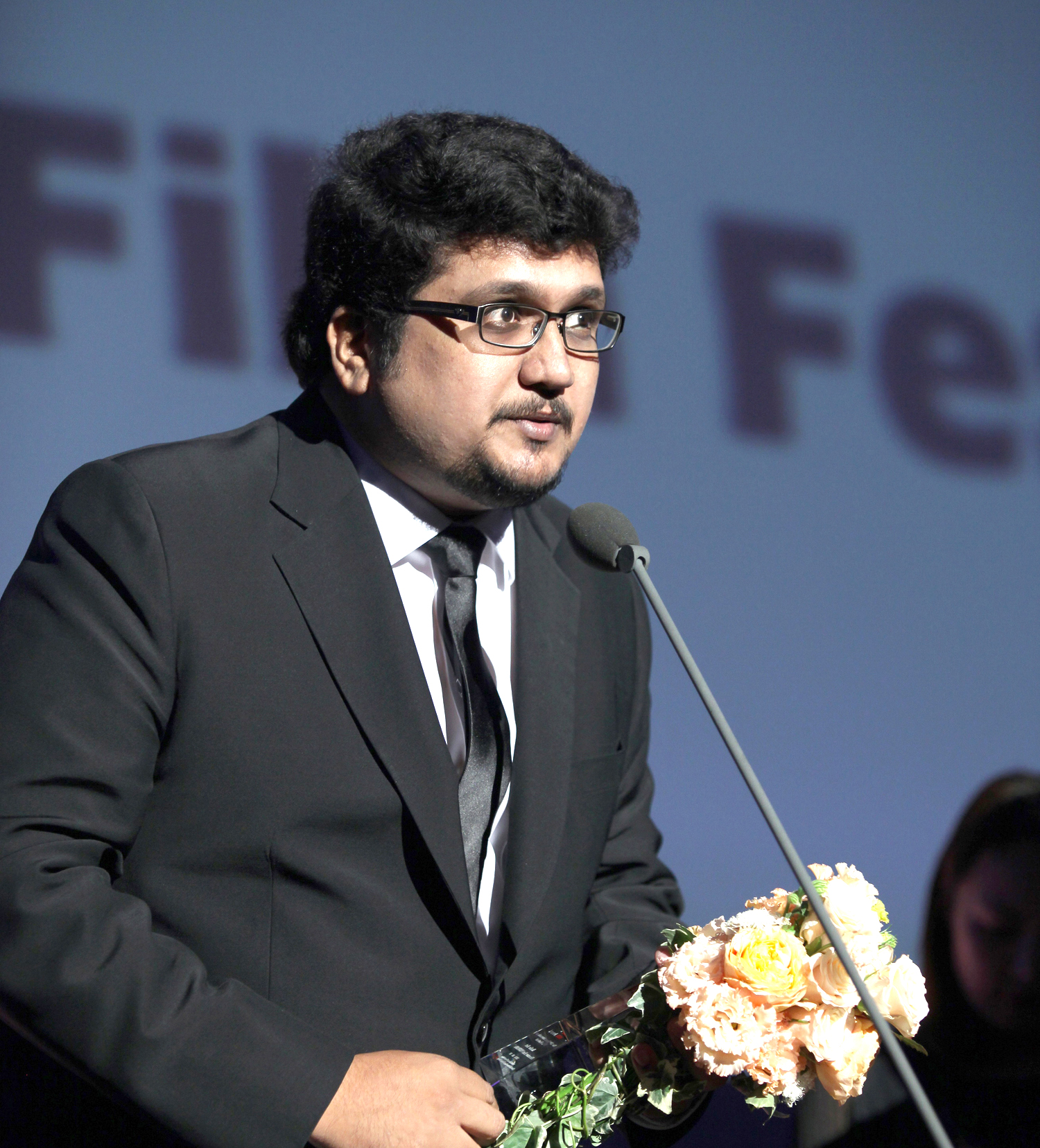
- Director Hari Viswanath
- Born: 18 December; Chennai, India
- Occupations: Film director, Screenwriter
- Years active: 2011 – Present

Hari Viswanath is an Indian film director, producer and screenwriter from Chennai, India. He is best known for his film Radiopetti ("Radio Set"), having won the "Audience Award Best Film" in the official competition at the Busan International Film Festival in 2015, which was later picked by Netflix. He was the jury member of Indian Panorama section of International Film Festival of India 2017 in Goa. Award-winning Films Radiopetti and Bansuri: The Flute has made him a notable director.

Radiopetti was officially selected as the only Tamil film for Indian Panorama for the 46th International Film Festival of India, held in Panaji, Goa. It also won the second "Best Film" award and a special jury award for "Best Acting" at the Chennai International Film Festival in 2015. The film also won the "Best Music" award at the 2016 ImagineIndia film festival in Spain and was officially selected in the 2016 Pune International Film Festival and in the eighth Panorama of Contemporary Indian Cinema, Auroville.

Hari's debut Hindi film Bansuri: The Flute, starred Anurag Kashyap and Rituparna Sengupta in lead roles.

== Biography ==
Born in Chennai, he is an engineer-turned-filmmaker. Hari's passion for film stems from accompanying his father to his theatre performances. Being closely associated with theatre crystallized his vision and path for himself. Inspired by real life incidents, he wrote and directed his debut short film "Idukkan" ("Sufferings") which won the "Best Short Film" award in the Norway Tamil Film Festival 2013. Ever since, he has been actively directing films and writing stories close to his heart.

== Filmography ==
Year	Film	Language	Credited as			Ref.
Year	Film	Language	Director	Writer	Producer	
2012	Idukkan	Tamil	Yes	Yes	Yes	
2013	Pesum Virus	Tamil	Yes	Yes	Yes	
2015	Radiopetti	Tamil	Yes	Yes	Yes	
2018	Monitor	Tamil	Yes	Yes	No	
2021	Bansuri: The Flute	Hindi	Yes	Yes	No	

== Awards ==
- Best Film (Audience Award) Busan International Film Festival 2015
- Best Film (second place) Chennai International Film Festival 2015
- Best Film - Government of Puducherry State Award
