= Thevar Magan =

1992 Indian film by Bharathan

- Theatrical release poster
- Directed by: Bharathan
- Written by: Kamal Haasan
- Produced by: Kamal Haasan
- Starring: Sivaji Ganesan; Kamal Haasan; Revathi; Gautami; Nassar
- Cinematography: P. C. Sreeram
- Edited by: N. P. Satish
- Music by: Ilaiyaraaja
- Production company: Raaj Kamal Films International
- Release date: 25 October 1992
- Running time: 158 minutes
- Country: India
- Language: Tamil

Thevar Magan (/ðeɪvər/ or /θeɪvər/ transl. Son of Thevar) (Note: The Mukkulathor people, who are also collectively known as Thevar, are native to the central and southern districts of Tamil Nadu, According to R. Muthulakshmi, Thevar literally means "celestial beings or divine-natured people".) is a 1992 Indian Tamil-language action drama film directed by Bharathan, and written and produced by Kamal Haasan. It stars Sivaji Ganesan, Haasan, Revathi, Gautami and Nassar; with Kallapart Natarajan, Kaka Radhakrishnan, Sangili Murugan and Vadivelu in supporting roles. The film's story involves a respected village chieftain's son who wants to open a business but his father wants him to help the villagers.

The script of Thevar Magan was completed in seven days; it was written using screenwriting software called Movie Magic. Haasan said The Godfather (1972) and the Kannada film Kaadu (1973) were inspirations for the film. P. C. Sreeram was the cinematographer and N. P. Satish edited the film, which was mostly made in Pollachi, with a few days' filming at Madras and Ooty.

Thevar Magan was released on 25 October 1992 – Diwali day; it received critical acclaim and completed a 175-day run at the box office. It was chosen as India's entry for the Best Foreign Language Film for the 65th Academy Awards but was not nominated. Thevar Magan won five National Film Awards, including Best Tamil Film, Best Supporting Actress for Revathi, and a Special Jury Award for Ganesan, which he declined. It was later remade in Hindi as Virasat (1997) and in Kannada as Thandege Thakka Maga (2006).

== Plot ==
Sakthivel returns home to his landlord father, Periyasamy Thevar's village in rural Madurai after completing his education in London. To his father's annoyance, he brings with him his westernised girlfriend Bhanumathi, hailing from Andhra Pradesh, to meet his family. Sakthi announces his plan to open a chain of restaurants in Madras and marry Banumathi, which saddens his father, as he wanted his son to help residents with his education. Periyasamy Thevar is a respected village chief whose younger half-brother, Chinnasamy Thevar, and nephew Mayan Thevar hold a grudge against him. Periyasamy's elder son, Muthuvel, though the oldest in his generation, is a drunkard. The entire village suffers from this long-standing family feud. Mayan always tries to outdo Periyasamy Thevar, as he believes Periyasamy to have poisoned Chinnasamy into paralysis.

Sakthi, despite reservations about the barbaric behavior persisting in the village, spends time there with Bhanu. They find an old temple, built by his great-grandfather, that has been closed off due to the feud between Periyasamy and Mayan over the first respect at the temple. Sakthi insists on entering with the help of his friend and servant, Isakki, who breaks open the temple. Mayan hears of this, and a riot erupts between the two village factions. To quell the situation, Periya Thevar contemplates apologizing to his opponents. Sakthi feels he or Isakki should apologize instead. Sakthi goes off to drop Bhanu at the station and, on his return, sees the riot. When Sakthi reaches home and asks for Isakki, he learns that Mayan's men have severed Isakki's left arm as punishment for opening the temple. To prevent further escalation, Sakthi, with his father's permission and with the help of his IAS friends in the government, legally opens the temple for all.

Slighted by this, Mayan hires goons to break a dam protecting a part of the village that supports Periya thevar. The goons use explosives to damage the dam, flooding half of the village and resulting in numerous deaths, including infants. This saddens Sakthi, who spots the goon who placed the explosives and gives chase. After capturing the goon, Sakthi hands him over to the police. The goon does not mention Mayan's involvement for fear of his own family's safety. Seeing the plight of the villagers, Sakthi changes his mind and decides to stay back with Periya Thevar. Weeks later, Mayan uses his clout to force a poor villager to close a portion of his land, preventing the public from easily reaching the main road. Sakthi and his father invite them for talks at the village panchayat to resolve the standoff.

In the panchayat, both sides repeatedly accuse the other. With no evidence, Mayan accuses Periya of orchestrating attacks on his brother's family and berates him. Disrespected and broken, Periya walks home and dies from a heart attack during sleep. Devastated and shocked about his father’s death and his disobedient behaviour, Sakthi takes over his father's duties as the village chieftain. The villagers express concern to Sakthi about having to daily circumnavigate the piece of land belonging to Mayan's side of the village, which causes a much longer travelling time. Sakthi reasons with the landowner Paramasivam to open it up for all villagers. Although understanding and willing, Paramasivam is Mayan's maternal uncle and is afraid of his nephew's backlash, especially because he has a daughter named Panchavarnam.

Sakthi assuages his fear by arranging the marriage between Panchavarnam and a Engineer from Madurai. Everybody involved happily agrees, and Paramasivam opens up the land. On the day of the wedding, however, the groom runs away, fearing Mayan. Paramasivam and Panchavarnam are distraught that if someone marries their daughter, they will live in constant fear. With her father's permission, Sakthi marries Panchavarnam, although he still has feelings for Bhanu. Mayan tries to counter Sakthi by getting Muthuvel drunk and obtaining his signature on ridiculous loan papers. The scheme is foiled in the last minute by Sakthi. Bhanu returns to meet Sakthi and learns about Sakthi's marriage. Although saddened, she understands the situation and leaves. Sakthi starts his new life with Panchavarnam. While Sakthi and Panchavaranam are returning from dropping off Banu at the station, a drive-by attempt is made on their life, which they narrowly escape. This brings them closer, and they start their marital intimacy.

A few weeks later, the HR&CE department plans the long-pending temple celebrations, and a problem arises about the first respect. Muthuvel is ineligible as he is a drunkard, and Mayan argues that he is the next eldest heir of the builder of the temple. Sakthi gives up the first respect for peace, but Mayan rejects it. He publicly taunts Sakthi that he will die soon and leaves. Weeks later, Sakthi is given the first respect, and the event starts. Sakthi's family learns that Panchavarnam is pregnant, and they are ecstatic.

Mayan plants a bomb during the temple chariot festival, causing deaths on both sides of the village. Enraged, both factions go after Mayan and his family. Sakthi protects the innocent family and helps them escape from the villagers. Appreciative of Sakthi's efforts to protect them, they disclose Mayan's hiding place. Sakthi locates Mayan and asks him to surrender to the police lest the villagers kill him, but Mayan refuses. Mayan blames Sakthi for his problems and tries to kill him. In the ensuing struggle, Sakthi accidentally beheads Mayan. The villagers offer to take the blame for Mayan's death, but Sakthi refuses and surrenders to the police. He asks the villagers to maintain peace, promote education for all, and leaves for jail, leaving the control in the hands of his sister-in-law.

== Cast ==
- Sivaji Ganesan as Periyasamy Thevar
- Kamal Haasan as Sakthivel Thevar
- Revathi as Panchavarnam
- Gautami as Bhanumathi
- Nassar as Maya Thevar (Mayan)
- Kaka Radhakrishnan as Chinnasamy Thevar
- Vadivelu as Isakki
- Kallapart Natarajan as Paramasivam
- Sangili Murugan as Subbiah
- Thalaivasal Vijay as Muthuvel Thevar
- S. N. Lakshmi as Kannatha, Mayan Thevar's mother
- Gandhimathi as Maragatham
- Renuka as Lakshmi, Sakthivel's sister-in-law
- Madhan Bob as Lawyer Kesavan
- Ajay Rathnam as S. Maruthupandi
- Neelima Rani as Meena, Mayan Thevar's daughter

== Production ==
=== Development ===
In the 1980s, Muktha Srinivasan planned to direct a film based on The Godfather (1972) with Sivaji Ganesan and Kamal Haasan but the project was abandoned after Haasan's associate Ananthu felt it would be a Ganesan-focused film rather than a Haasan film. Haasan later wrote a script, which eventually became Thevar Magan, in seven days, although he said he was challenged to write it in twelve. The film was initially titled Nammavar but was later renamed to its final title. Haasan also said it was inspired by The Godfather and the Kannada film Kaadu (1973). Due to his lack of experience in directing, Haasan approached Bharathan to direct Thevar Magan.

According to Haasan, Thevar Magan is the first film that was written using a screenwriting software called "Movie Magic". P. C. Sreeram was the cinematographer and N. P. Satish edited the film. Tirru worked as Sreeram's assistant and actor Tinku worked as assistant photographer.

=== Writing disputes ===
A significant controversy arose concerning Thevar Magan, with writer Kalaignanam alleging that its plot was originally his. According to Kalaignanam, he had previously discussed this very storyline with director Gangai Amaran, envisioning Haasan as the protagonist. However, the initial project was shelved. Later, when Thevar Magan was produced, Kalaignanam claimed Haasan appropriated his story and took sole credit for the writer. This contentious issue was first brought before the film council, then became the subject of a legal case. While Haasan reportedly reached an out-of-court settlement, Kalaignanam maintained he was unjustly defrauded, and Haasan ultimately kept the writer's credit for the film.

In 2016, Gangai Amaran said he was supposed to direct a film titled Adhi Veerapandian starring Haasan but Amaran's brother Ilaiyaraaja advised Haasan against accepting the film, feeling Amaran was "not a good filmmaker", and the film was shelved. Amaran said; "Kamal took the story of Adhi Veerapandian and remade it as Thevar Magan".

=== Casting ===
According to Haasan, casting was done "against everyone else's suggestion". In portraying Sakthi, Haasan wore colourful, buttoned-up shirts and jeans, and a medium-size beard and a mullet in the first half of the film. He grew a thick handlebar moustache and wore six yards (5.5 m) of village dhoti for the part of village head. The unit had originally wanted to cast either Vijayakumar or S. S. Rajendran for the character Periya Thevar but Haasan approached Sivaji Ganesan, who completed his scenes within seven days. Haasan persuaded Ganesan because it was his long-time desire to act in at least one film with him; Ganesan, who had retired from acting, agreed. Haasan described Thevar Magan as a "love story about Sivaji and me. I wanted to become him and he allowed me to become him".

Meena was approached to play the character Panchavarnam; she acted for a few days but was soon replaced by Revathi. Gautami played Sakthi's initial lover Bhanu; her voice was dubbed by K. R. Anuradha. Vadivelu, who played Isakki, said; "While shooting of Singaravelan, Kamal asked me to go to his Raaj Kamal office next morning and collect an advance payment for my role in his next film, Thevar Magan. But, I was not ready to wait until the next morning. So I went to his office the same evening after the shoot" and received a cheque for ₹5,000. Thalaivasal Vijay was cast as Sakthi's elder brother on Haasan's recommendation. Salim Ghouse was the initial choice for the role of the antagonist Mayan Thevar which ultimately went to Nassar. Neelima portrayed Mayan's daughter – it was her feature-film debut.

=== Filming ===
Thevar Magan was mostly filmed at Pollachi in 75 days, and for few days at Madras and Ooty. Some scenes were filmed at a palatial bungalow situated at Singanallur. Haasan has stated the scene in which a truck with a cargo of steel rods jutting out reverses into a car was initially written for Nayakan (1987) but could not be used there because producer Muktha Srinivasan would not let a car be damaged. Kalaignanam suggested the concept of one temple having two locks, which Haasan liked and added. Some scenes were filmed at Mariamman Temple in Sulukkal, Pollachi. Nassar filmed only seven scenes, of which two are major. Sreeram revealed, "after I heard the story from Bharatan, I wanted the whole film to have a rustic colour. So I took the extreme step of laying a whole road with coconut husk for a shot of one car going on the road in the beginning of the film". There was a scene where the bund has been breached by some people and in order to have a "wet, messy look", Sreeram and crew for six days had to "water the place before every shot". The film's end where Haasan gets into the train was shot at a railway station near Pollachi.

== Themes and influences ==
According to Haasan, Thevar Magan was inspired by The Godfather and Kaadu; journalist S. Shiva Kumar said he re-used The Godfather's "crucial emotional core of a reluctant son ascending a throne full of thorns". Baradwaj Rangan said Haasan's screenplay "uses small gestures to say a lot between the lines, without explaining everything in tiresome detail", and that Bhanu is frequently shown boarding and alighting from trains, establishing her status as an outsider.

== Soundtrack ==
Ilaiyaraaja composed the soundtrack of Thevar Magan and the lyrics were written by Vaali. It was released under the label AVM Audio. Embar Kannan performed the violin portions. The soundtrack has eight tracks with two alternatives. Haasan's six-year-old daughter Shruti made her singing debut with this film, singing one version of "Potri Paadadi Penne". Haasan credited Gangai Amaran for the idea of "Sandhu Pottu", which was initially intended for Adhi Veerapandian. "Manamagale Manamagale" is set in the Carnatic raga known as Shuddha Saveri, "Maasaru Ponne" is set in Mayamalavagowla, and "Inji Iduppazhagi" is set in Jaunpuri. It was later remixed by Smita for her album Kalakkal. The original song was re-used in the 2015 film of the same name.

Track listing
No.	Title	Singer(s)	Length
1.	"Potri Paadadi Penne" (Version 1)	T. K. S. Kalaivanan, Mano	4:57
2.	"Potri Paadadi Penne" (Version 2)	Sivaji Ganesan, Shruti Haasan	1:26
3.	"Sandhu Pottu"	S. P. Balasubrahmanyam, Kamal Haasan	5:10
4.	"Vaanam Thottu Pona"	S. P. Balasubrahmanyam	2:26
5.	"Vettaruva Thangi"	S. P. Balasubrahmanyam	2:38
6.	"Ada Puthiyathu Piranthadhu"	Malaysia Vasudevan	4:43
7.	"Inji Idupazhaga" (Solo)	S. Janaki	2:16
8.	"Inji Idupazhagi" (Duet)	S. Janaki, Kamal Haasan, Minmini	3:29
9.	"Manamagale Manamagale"	Swarnalatha, Minmini, Sindhuja	2:16
10.	"Masaru Ponnae Varuga"	Minmini, Swarnalatha	3:12
Total length:			32:33

== Release ==
Thevar Magan was released on 25 October 1992, Diwali day. The film was dubbed in Telugu as Kshatriya Putrudu. The film became controversial for identifying the Thevar community with glorified violence, and faced competition from other Diwali releases Pandian, Rasukutty, Senthamizh Paattu, Kaviya Thalaivan, Thirumathi Palanisamy, Thai Mozhi and Mangala Nayagan. Despite these, Thevar Magan was commercially successful and ran for 175 days, becoming a silver jubilee film. Dilip Kumar attended the film's silver-jubilee celebration. No print of Thevar Magan has survived but the film is available on home video.

=== Reception ===
Thevar Magan received critical acclaim. On 25 October 1992, The Indian Express said; "The formidable combination of Kamal Haasan and Sivaji Ganesan, the directorial talent of Bharathan, excellent cinematography of P. C. Sriram and music by the maestro [Ilaiyaraaja], have all gone into producing Thevar Magan". The Tamil magazine Ananda Vikatan in its review dated 8 November 1992 appreciated the film and said its naturalism is greatly enhanced by the giving of equal opportunity to all actors in the film. It rated the film 60 out of 100. K. Vijiyan of New Sunday Times wrote, "Devar Magan proved a satisfying experience at the cinema and well worth the wait". C. R. K. of Kalki praised the film for perfectly concentrating on character design, natural dialogues and the screenplay that carries these elements.

=== Accolades ===
Thevar Magan was chosen as India's entry for the Best Foreign Language Film for the 65th Academy Awards but was not nominated. The film was screened at the Toronto International Film Festival in 1994. Ilaiyaraaja was a strong contender for the National Film Award for Best Music Direction, which he lost to A. R. Rahman for Roja; the award was tied with eight votes each for Ilaiyaraaja and Rahman before the chairman of the jury Balu Mahendra voted in favour of Rahman. Ganesan had been awarded the Special Jury Award – Actor in the same ceremony but he refused to accept the award. Haasan claimed he convinced Ganesan not to accept it.

Award	Date of ceremony (Note: Date is linked to the article about the awards held that year, wherever possible.)	Category	Nominee(s)	Result	Ref.
National Film Awards	5 May 1993	Best Feature Film in Tamil	Kamal Haasan, Bharathan	Won	
National Film Awards	5 May 1993	Best Supporting Actress	Revathi	Won	
National Film Awards	5 May 1993	Best Female Playback Singer	S. Janaki	Won	
National Film Awards	5 May 1993	Best Audiography	N. Pandu Rangan	Won	
National Film Awards	5 May 1993	Special Jury Award – Actor	Sivaji Ganesan (declined)	Won	
Tamil Nadu State Film Awards	c. 1994	Tamil Nadu State Film Award for Best Film-(Second Prize)	Kamal Haasan	Won	
Tamil Nadu State Film Awards	c. 1994	Best Actor	Kamal Haasan	Won	
Tamil Nadu State Film Awards	c. 1994	Best Choreographer	Raghuram	Won	
Filmfare Awards South	13 October 1993	Best Actor – Tamil	Kamal Haasan	Won	
Filmfare Awards South	13 October 1993	Best Actress – Tamil	Revathi	Won	
Cinema Express Awards	14 June 1993	Best Film	Kamal Haasan	Won	
Cinema Express Awards	14 June 1993	Best Actress	Revathi	Won	
Film Fans Association	–	Best Actress	Revathi	Won	

== Remakes ==
Haasan initially planned to remake Thevar Magan in Hindi with Dilip Kumar in Ganesan's role but according to Haasan, Kumar found the theme "too violent" and refused the offer. Priyadarshan directed the Hindi remake Virasat (1997). S. Mahendar remade Thevar Magan in Kannada as Thandege Thakka Maga (2006).

== Legacy ==
Thevar Magan attained cult status in Tamil cinema. Rajan Krishnan, a scholar in film studies, said; "it was Kamal Hassan who brought that sickle bearing genre", and that "Thevar Magan ... inaugurated the era of the south being represented as primarily a sickle bearing space". Stalin Rajangam, who has extensively written on the caste component and narrative structures of Tamil films, said; "Thevar Magan was first of its kind with stronger idioms of caste and glorification of caste-based practices". Tamil writer S. Ramakrishnan said Thevar Magan captured "the very essence of the south Tamil Nadu's rural culture". Vadivelu called the film a "turning point" in his career.

Directors N. Lingusamy, Mysskin, Gautham Vasudev Menon, and S. J. Suryah called Thevar Magan one of their favourite films. Gauthami also listed it as her one of her favourite films. Sify, in its review of Sandakozhi (2005), compared Rajkiran's character with Ganesan's character in Thevar Magan. The July 2010 edition of magazine South Scope included Haasan's performance in 'Thevar Magan in its list of "Kamal's best performances". Silverscreen in its review of Vetrivel (2016) called the film "pretty much an unsophisticated copy of Thevar Magan".

In 2013, The Hindu listed the song "Potri Paadadi" among lyricist Vaali's songs in the list "Best of Vaali: From 1964 – 2013". Rediff listed the same song alongside "Madhavi Pon Mayilaal" from Iru Malargal (1967) and "Andha Naal Gnabagam" from Uyarndha Manithan (1968). On Haasan's birthday, 7 November 2015, Latha Srinivasan of Daily News and Analysis considered Thevar Magan to be one of the "films you must watch to grasp the breadth of Kamal Haasan's repertoire".

== See also ==
- List of submissions to the 65th Academy Awards for Best Foreign Language Film
- List of Indian submissions for the Academy Award for Best Foreign Language Film

== Bibliography ==
- Baskaran, S. Theodore (2015) [2008]. Sivaji Ganesan: Profile of an Icon. Wisdom Tree. ISBN 9788183281096.
- Dhananjayan, G. (2014). Pride of Tamil Cinema: 1931–2013. Blue Ocean Publishers. OCLC 898765509.
- Mathai, Kamini (2009). A. R. Rahman: The Musical Storm. India: Penguin Books. ISBN 978-0-670-08371-8.
- Muthulakshmi, R. (1997). Female Infanticide, Its Causes and Solutions. Discovery Publishing. ISBN 978-8-17141-383-6.
- Raj, Maya (July 2010). "Style Sutra: Kamal Haasan". South Scope.
- Rajadhyaksha, Ashish; Willemen, Paul (1998) [1994]. Encyclopaedia of Indian Cinema. British Film Institute and Oxford University Press. ISBN 0-19-563579-5.
- Velayutham, Selvaraj (2008). Tamil Cinema:The Cultural Politics of India's other film country. Routledge. ISBN 978-0-415-39680-6.
