= Vai Raja Vai =

2015 Indian film by Aishwarya R. Dhanush

- Movie poster
- Directed by: Aishwarya R. Dhanush
- Written by: Aishwarya R. Dhanush; Madhan Karky (dialogue)
- Produced by: Kalpathi S. Aghoram; Kalpathi S. Ganesh; Kalpathi S. Suresh
- Starring: Gautham Ram Karthik; Priya Anand; Vivek; Sathish; Daniel Balaji; Gayathri Raguram
- Cinematography: Velraj
- Edited by: V. T. Vijayan; T. S. Jay
- Music by: Yuvan Shankar Raja
- Production company: AGS Entertainment
- Release date: 1 May 2015
- Running time: 125 minutes
- Country: India
- Language: Tamil

Vai Raja Vai (transl. Place It King, Place It) is a 2015 Indian Tamil language black comedy crime thriller film written and directed by Aishwarya Dhanush, and produced by AGS Entertainment featuring an ensemble cast starring Gautham Ram Karthik, Priya Anand, Vivek, Gayathri Raguram and Daniel Balaji with S. J. Suryah, Taapsee and Dhanush playing guest appearances. The film was announced on 12 September 2013, along with the commencement of principal photography.

Yuvan Shankar Raja composed the film's soundtrack and score. The film's plot summary is a mix of Hollywood movies Next and 21.

The film was released on 1 May 2015 to mixed reviews from critics and was declared successful at the box office.

== Plot ==
Karthik is a middle-class boy gifted with extrasensory perception who works at an IT company. He has a girlfriend Priya. During school days, he scores good in the exams using his power, so his father asks him to suppress this power to avoid suspicion due to prior incidents. Then Karthik meets Pandian aka Panda at his office and befriends him. Panda, a gambler, learns of Karthik's power and asks him to play cricket gambling by using his power. Rangarajan aka Rande is in charge of cricket gambling under an unknown man known as Kumar. Karthik wins a crore in gambling and uses 10 lakhs for his elder sister Gayathri's marriage. Panda, Karthik and Sathish goes on a vacation to Goa to spend the gambling money. There, Rande threatens Karthik to play roulette in the Casino Royale ship. Initially Karthik hesitates, but Rande threatens him by kidnapping Priya. Karthik accepts to play. By this incident, Priya realises Karthik's power. To train Karthik, Shreya comes to help. Karthik plays the game and tricks Rande to take his place in gambling. The casino officials arrest Rande. Karthik, with his money won in the gambling with Panda, Sathish and Priya, escapes and goes back home. Shreya helps Rande escape from guards by the saying of Kumar. Rande traces Karthik and takes him to his place. There, Karthik uses his power to fight Rande's sidekicks and threatens Rande. At that time, a Rolls-Royce Phantom arrives and is revealed that the unknown man Kumar is Kokki Kumar, and he asks Karthik to play for him in politics.

== Cast ==
- Gautham Ram Karthik as Karthik
  - Saran Shakthi as Young Karthik
- Priya Anand as Priya
- Vivek as Pandian (Panda)
- Sathish as Sathish
- Daniel Balaji as Rangarajan (Rande)
- Gayathri Raghuram as Gayathri
- Vasanth as Karthik's father
- Sriranjani as Seetha, Karthik's mother
- Bose Venkat as Inspector Velraj
- M. S. Bhaskar as Karthik's uncle
- Manobala as Mano
- Kavithalaya Krishnan as Broker
- Mayilswamy
- Swaminathan
- Besant Ravi
- Vijay Babu as Priya's father
- Rindhuravi as Priya's mother
- Usha Elizabeth as Sana, Sathish's mother
- Priya Bhavani Shankar as News Reporter

=== Guest appearances ===
- S. J. Suryah as himself in the song "Vandha Kadha"
- Taapsee as Shreya
- Dhanush as Kokki Kumar

== Production ==
=== Casting ===
Initially, director Aishwarya's choice for the lead actor was Atharvaa, but due to schedule conflicts he was unable to work on the project, therefore, Gautham Karthik was signed to play the male lead. It was later announced that Priya Anand was going to be the female lead opposite Gautham in the film. Velraj was confirmed as cinematographer for the film.

Director Vasanth was cast as Gautham's father to make his acting debut, while choreographer Gayathri Raguram was signed to play Gautham's sister, making her return as an actress after a ten-year hiatus. Taapsee Pannu and Daniel Balaji were chosen to perform guest appearances in the film. Taapsee's role would be a surprise element in the film as for the first time she plays a character with a negative shade. She later stated that she was not playing the villain in the film but "an aloof girl who is a regular at casinos". In November 2014, Dhanush also shot for a cameo role, reprising the role he played in the film Pudhupettai, Kokki Kumar.

=== Filming ===
The film was mostly shot in Chennai, with major portions being shot at Pacifica Tech Park, OMR. The climax scenes were filmed in a cruise liner as the ship sailed a seven-night itinerary across Singapore, Thailand and Vietnam. In December 2013, the crew filmed a song in Osaka, Japan. Gayathri Raguram, besides acting in the film, choreographed the love duet. A few scenes and songs were also canned in Goa.

== Soundtrack ==
Vai Raja Vai

Soundtrack album by Yuvan Shankar Raja
- Released: 10 December 2014
- Recorded: 2013–2014
- Genre: Feature film soundtrack
- Length: 19:41
- Language: Tamil
- Label: Sony Music India
- Producer: Yuvan Shankar Raja

Yuvan Shankar Raja chronology
Poojai (2014)	Vai Raja Vai (2014)	Idam Porul Yaeval (2014)

Singles from Vai Raja Vai
- 1. "Move Your Body" Released: 18 August 2014

Yuvan Shankar Raja was chosen to compose the film's soundtrack and score, making his first collaboration with Aishwarya R. Dhanush. The soundtrack album featuring five tracks was released on 10 December 2014 in Chennai. Four months earlier, a single from the album, "Move Your Body", a song in the trap-and-bass genre, which was written by Aishwarya's husband, actor Dhanush and sung by Maestro Ilaiyaraaja, was released on YouTube on 18 August 2014. Besides Dhanush, Madhan Karky wrote two songs, while Gana Bala and Hiphop Tamizha wrote and performed each a song.

No.	Title	Lyrics	Singer(s)	Length
1.	"Vandha Kadha"	Gana Bala	Gana Bala	3:32
2.	"Pachchai Vanna"	Madhan Karky	Yuvan Shankar Raja	4:15
3.	"Pookkamazh"	Madhan Karky	Tanvi Shah, Yuvan Shankar Raja	3:58
4.	"Naam Vaazhndhidum (Title Track)"	Hiphop Tamizha	Hiphop Tamizha, Yuvan Shankar Raja	4:39
5.	"Move Your Body"	Dhanush	Ilaiyaraaja	3:17
Total length:				19:41

== Release ==
A first-look teaser of 70 seconds was released on 18 April 2014 which received a good response. The trailer was released alongside the soundtrack on 10 December 2014. The satellite rights of the film were sold to STAR Vijay.

=== Critical reception ===
The New Indian Express stated the film was "compact, breezy, stylish and a pleasant watch". Sify called the film "a perfect recipe of a full-on entertainer without even a dash of obscenity or violence...the film is smartly packaged as an exciting and stylish entertainer". The Times of India gave 3 stars out of 5 and wrote, "The film isn't perfect, far from it, it has a few weak spots that could have been disastrous but the confidence with which Aishwaryaa manages to narrate this story helps us tide over its issues".

The Hindu wrote that "her second film too suffers from bipolar disorder". Indo-Asian News Service gave 2 stars out of 5 and wrote, "Vai Raja Vai is a good effort gone completely awry", noting that "the first half is incredible fun" but that the film "goes haywire post interval". Rediff gave the same rating and wrote, "Despite a good storyline, young enthusiastic cast and an impressive technical crew, the film barely manages to hold your attention", calling the film a "let down".

== Box office ==
The film collected ₹3.35 crore (US$350,000) in Tamil Nadu in first day.
