= Repallelo Radha =

Indian Telugu-language romantic drama film

- Directed by: Sarath
- Based on: Repallelo Radha by Balabhadrapatruni Ramani
- Produced by: M. R. V. Prasad
- Starring: Dilip Tadeshwar; Gayathri Raghuram
- Music by: Koti
- Release date: 6 July 2001
- Country: India
- Language: Telugu

Repallelo Radha is a 2001 Indian Telugu-language romantic drama film directed by Sarath and starring newcomers Dilip Tadeshwar and Gayathri Raghuram (credited as Deeksha).

== Cast ==
- Dilip Tadeshwar
- Gayathri Raghuram
- Kaikala Satyanarayana
- Sujatha
- Gummadi
- Brahmanandam
- Chalapathi Rao
- Rama Prabha
- Tanikella Bharani
- Jhansi
- Sudhakar
- M. S. Narayana
- Ranganath
- Ananth

== Production ==
The film's story is based on the novel of the same name by Balabhadrapatruni Ramani that featured in the Andhra Prabha weekly. Ramani chose Dilip Tadeshwar, who appeared in Hindi music videos, to be the film's hero. Producer M. R. V. Prasad, who previously worked with Sarath for Sultan (1999) launched a new banner Priyadarshini Pictures for this film, which marked the return of Gummadi after a hiatus. The recording of the songs was scheduled to take place on 21 March 2001. The film was shot in Rajahmundry.

== Soundtrack ==
Repallelo Radha

Soundtrack album by Koti
- Released: 2001
- Genre: Feature film soundtrack
- Language: Telugu

Koti chronology
Nuvvu Naaku Nachav (2001)	Repallelo Radha (2001)	Adhipathi (2001)

Video Jukebox
- Repallelo Radha – Jukebox on YouTube

The soundtrack was composed by Koti. The song "Oh Papa" was based on "Rasputin". Nachaki of Telugu Cinema wrote "The album is again one good piece by Koti, but is very much dominated by the beat. The nativity of villages, as required by the theme of the movie, can be noticed in the compositions and lyrics".

Track listing
No.	Title	Lyrics	Singer(s)	Length
1.	"Raave Samajavaragamana"	Veturi Sundararama Murthy	Tippu, K. S. Chithra	3:56
2.	"Oh Papa Iropalo"	Veturi Sundararama Murthy	Devi Sri Prasad, K. S. Chithra	4:03
3.	"Oh Prema Na Priyathama"	Veturi Sundararama Murthy	Sriram Prabhu, K. S. Chithra	4:58
4.	"Gudi Gantale"	Sri Harsha	Sujatha Mohan	4:13
5.	"Paathika Daatani"	Bhuvana Chandra	Koti, Krishna Raj, Radhika, Sandhya	3:54
6.	"Yenchakka Unnave"	Veturi Sundararama Murthy	Varikuppala Yadagiri, Radhika

== Release ==
The film was a box office failure and producer M. R. V. Prasad who produced films with Nandamuri Balakrishna like Bala Gopaludu (1989) and Sultan never lost money on those films but lost money on this film. He was also deceived by a USA distributor who after screening the film for one month there, "lost" the print of the film and did not pay him.
