= Locker (film) =

- Theatrical release poster
- Directed by: Rajasekar Natarajan; Yuvaraj Kannan
- Starring: Vignesh Shanmugham; Niranjini Ashokan; Nivas Adithan
- Cinematography: Thanikai Dasan
- Edited by: Srikanth Kanaparthi
- Music by: Vykunth Srinivasan
- Production company: Narayanan Selvam Productions
- Distributed by: Action Reaction Jenish
- Release date: 24 November 2023
- Running time: 129 mins
- Country: India
- Language: Tamil

Locker is a 2023 Indian Tamil-language action drama film written and directed by Rajasekar Natarajan and Yuvaraj Kannan. Produced by Narayanan Selvam Productions, the film stars Vignesh Shanmugham, Niranjini Ashokan and Nivas Adithan in the lead roles. The film was released theatrically on 24 November 2023.

== Cast ==
- Vignesh Shanmugham as Jana
- Niranjini Ashokan as Pooja
- Nivas Adithan as Chakravarthy
- Subramanian Madhavan as an auditor
- Taj Babu as Kathir
- Prakash as Venkat
- Bennet
- Arumugham

== Production ==
The film was produced by Narayanan Selvam Productions, with director duo Rajasekar Natarajan and Yuvaraj Kannan signed on to make their debut.

== Release and reception ==
The film had a theatrical release on 24 November 2023 across Tamil Nadu. A reviewer from Times Now noted that "despite occasional moments of boredom and distraction, Locker succeeds in delivering a decent cinematic experience" and that "while it may not be groundbreaking or flawless, the movie manages to strike a balance between its various elements, creating an engaging cinematic journey". Critics from Zee News and Dinamalar gave the film mixed reviews, with the latter rating it at 2 out of 5.
