= Thandege Thakka Maga =

- VCD cover
- Directed by: S. Mahendar
- Story by: Kamal Haasan
- Based on: Thevar Magan
- Produced by: R. Pavan Kumar
- Starring: Ambareesh; Upendra; Laila; Sakshi Shivanand
- Cinematography: Krishna Kumar
- Edited by: P. R. Soundarrajan
- Music by: S. A. Rajkumar 3 songs sourced from Ilayaraja
- Production company: Sri Mahalakshmi Productions
- Release date: 31 March 2006
- Running time: 162 minutes
- Country: India
- Language: Kannada

Thandege Thakka Maga (transl. A befitting son) is a 2006 Indian Kannada-language action drama film directed by S. Mahendar. The film stars Ambareesh and Upendra along with Laila, Sakshi Shivanand and Ashish Vidyarthi in other prominent roles. It is a remake of the Tamil film Thevar Magan (1992). The film was a box office failure.

== Plot ==
Foreign-educated Satya, son of a village chieftain returns home after a long stay abroad. He is accompanied by his girlfriend, Sathya, with whom he intends to settle in a city and start a business. However, things get problematic when Sathya is forced to marry a woman from a lower caste after his father's sudden death.

== Cast ==
- Ambareesh as Chowdaiah
- Upendra as Sathya
- Laila as Pancharangi
- Sakshi Shivanand as Bhanu
- Ashish Vidyarthi as Dharmanna
- Srinivasa Murthy as Veeraiah
- M. N. Lakshmi Devi
- Ramesh Bhat
- Komal Kumar
- Bank Janardhan
- B. V. Radha
- Shankar Ashwath
- Chitra Shenoy

== Production ==
The film was launched on 20 February 2005 at Ashoka Hotel, Bangalore. KFCC president HD Gangaraju sounded the first clap, while Dharam Singh, the then Chief Minister of Karnataka, switched on the camera.

== Soundtrack ==
The music of the film was composed by S. A. Rajkumar. Three songs were reused from the original version which was composed by Ilaiyaraaja: "Jajiya Hoovu Chanda" is based on "Inji Idupazhagi", "Kaveri Seemyaga" is based on "Potri Paadadi" and "Nammoora Deepa" is based on "Vaanam Thottu", respectively. The song "Kailasada Aa Shivanigu" is based on "Vellipani Mutrathil" portion of song "Golukathu Radhai" from Anandham. The audio was launched at Chandrashekhar Patil playground at Gulbarga at 9 December 2005.

Track listing
No.	Title	Lyrics	Singer(s)	Length
1.	"Kaveri Seemeyaaga"	Doddarangegowda	S. P. Balasubrahmanyam
2.	"Dore Dore"	Kaviraj	S. P. Balasubrahmanyam
3.	"Savaalaku Savaalaku"	Kaviraj	Rajesh Krishnan
4.	"Jajiya Hoovu Chanda"	V. Nagendra Prasad	Rajesh Krishnan, K. S. Chithra
5.	"Dum Dama Dum Dama"	V. Nagendra Prasad	Shankar Mahadevan
6.	"Namma Oora Deepa"	Doddarangegowda	S. P. Balasubrahmanyam, Baby Vyshali
7.	"Kailasada Aa Shivanigu"	Kaviraj	Chorus

== Critical reception ==
The Hindu wrote, "Producer R. Pavan Kumar deserves a mention for his tasteful choice. However, director S. Mahendar has overlooked many sensitive aspects and the insightful social struggle poignantly delineated in the original. Comparing Thevar Magan with Tandege Takka Maga becomes inevitable as the latter poses some basic questions such as what role creativity plays in the direction of a film based on an already acclaimed biopic with the director being loyal frame-to-frame to the original with no fresh perspective to offer". R. G. Vijayasarathy wrote for Rediff.com, "Thandege Thakka Maga will please those who have not seen the original Tamil film".

Sify wrote, "This remake of the 14 years old Tamil classic Thevar Magan is passable. S.Mahender has been able to retain the Kannada nativity, with excellent performance from the lead cast plus excellent camerawork and music lifts the film". S. N. Deepak of Deccan Herald wrote, "Director Mahendar who successfully remade Ninagagi later failed in his attempts to do remakes or original Kannada films. Thandege Takka Maga lacks lustre. His efforts to adopt the story to Kannada could have been much more effective".
