= Regina (2023 film) =

Indian Tamil-language crime thriller film

- Theatrical release poster
- Directed by: Domin D. Silva
- Produced by: Sathish Nair
- Starring: Sunaina; Ananth Nag; Vivek Prasanna
- Cinematography: Pavi K. Pavan
- Edited by: Toby John
- Music by: Sathish Nair
- Production company: Yellow Bear Production
- Release date: 23 June 2023
- Country: India
- Language: Tamil

Regina is a 2023 Indian Tamil-language crime thriller film directed by Domin. D. Silva and produced by Sathish Nair under banner Yellow Bear Production. The film stars Sunaina in the titular role, along with Ananth, Nivas Adithan, and Vivek Prasanna in supporting roles.

== Premise ==
Regina learns that her husband Jo got killed in an unexpected heist, where she sets out to exact vengeance on the robbers and their leader.

== Cast ==
- Sunaina as Regina
- Ananth Nag as Jo
- Rithu Manthra as Julie
- Nivas Adithan as Driver
- Vivek Prasanna as Corrupt Police Officer
- Gajaraj as GM
- Bava Chelladurai as Social Activist
- Sai Dheena as Dheena
- Appani Sarath as Rajesh
- Silky Prema as Maari
- Pasupathi Raj as Writer

== Production ==
The film's shooting began in Pollachi, a town and taluk in Coimbatore district, and continued in several areas of Kerala during April 2022.

== Music ==
The music for the film was composed by Sathish Nair.

Track listing
No.	Title	Lyrics	Singer(s)	Length
1.	"Sooravali Pola"	Yugabharathi	Sid Sriram	4:40
2.	"Sceneu Gangu Da"	Ijaz	Shyam	3:10
3.	"Naam Ulaavum Oadai"	Vivek Velmurugan	Chinmayi Sripaada	3:08
4.	"Kodi Kodi Pagai"	Yugabharathi	Malathy	3:13
5.	"Sooravali Pola Female"	Yugabharathi	Vandana Srinivasan	4:40
6.	"Veezhndhen Enre Ninaithaayo"	Vincent Vijayan	Kalpana Raghavendar	2:21
Total length:				21:12

== Release ==
The film was released on 23 June 2023.

== Reception ==
Kirtana of ABP Nadu gave one point five stars out of five and wrote that "All in all, they made me feel like a mediocre movie that I have seen before". Anusha Sundar of The New Indian Express wrote that "There is an artificiality in the emotions, superficiality in characters, and reasoning behind their actions." and gave one point five out of five rating. Janani K of India Today rated 1.5 out of 5 and stated that "Sunaina’s performance and her transformation do not attract our attention either".

Padmakumar K of Onmanorama wrote that "The cinematic potential of the story could have been explored more. Nevertheless 'Ragina' succeeds as an engrossing thriller."
