= Shankar Dayal =

Indian director (d. 2024)

- Born: 1969 or 1970
- Died: 19 December 2024
- Occupation(s): Director, writer
- Years active: 2003–2024

Shankar Dayal (died 19 December 2024) was an Indian screenwriter and film director who worked in Tamil films. He made his directorial debut with Saguni (2012). He was known for his approach in showcasing societal themes and the plight of the political landscape.

== Career ==
Shankar began his career as a dialogue writer to films. He wrote dialogues for Arjun Sarja starrer Parasuram (2003) and for Jayam Ravi starrer Deepavali (2007).

He had a breakthrough in his film career through his maiden directorial venture Saguni, where he cast Karthi in the main lead role alongside comedian Santhanam in the supporting role. His first tryst with feature film direction, Saguni, became a profitable venture at the box office. Saguni focused more on the importance of corruption, mafia and political blame game despite the film's genre being an out-and-out political satire.

His second directorial venture titled Kuzhanthaigal Munnetra Kazhagam created a buzz in the social circles and the film fraternity as prominent comedians Senthil and Yogi Babu were roped into the important roles for the film; hence the duo were regarded as the fulcrums of the film, considering the speculations about the scope of the film content to be oriented and tilted mostly on the humor trajectory.

== Death ==
Dayal died on 19 December 2024, at the age of 54, after suffering a heart attack.

== Filmography ==
Year	Film	Director	Writer	Notes
2003	Parasuram	No	Dialogues	
2007	Deepavali	No	Dialogues	
2012	Saguni	Yes	Yes	
2025	Kuzhanthaigal Munnetra Kazhagam	Yes	Yes	Also producer
