= Bhagya Debata =

1995 film directed by Raghuram

- Promotional poster
- Directed by: Raghuram
- Written by: Raghuram
- Produced by: Raghuram, Lakshmi Chitram Films, Kolkata
- Starring: Mithun Chakraborty; Soham Chakraborty; Rajinikanth; Soumitra Chatterjee; Mamta Kulkarni; Puneet Issar; Rituparna Sengupta
- Cinematography: Debraj Ray
- Music by: Madhu Burman; Gopal Burman
- Distributed by: Venus Films
- Release date: 22 December 1995
- Country: India
- Language: Bengali

Bhagya Debata (transl. Angel of destiny) is a 1995 Indian Bengali-language action film directed by Raghuram, a dance choreographer in South Indian cinema, starring Mithun Chakraborty, Soham Chakraborty, Soumitra Chatterjee, Mamta Kulkarni, Rituparna Sengupta and Puneet Issar. Tamil film actor Rajinikanth made a special appearance and his only film where he has acted in Bengali language till date.

== Plot ==
The film is an action-drama about revenge. The protagonist Jagadish Mondal (Mithun Chakraborty) appears like a Robin Hood character, always there to help the poor. In normal life he is an ordinary man with a wife, but against corruption and crime he becomes Alfred.

== Cast ==
- Mithun Chakraborty as Jagadish/Alfred (dual role)
- Rituparna Sengupta as Sabitri, Jagadish's wife
- Soham Chakraborty
- Rajinikanth (Special appearance)
- Soumitra Chatterjee (Special appearance) as Somnath Bahaduri
- Mamta Kulkarni (Special appearance)
- Puneet Issar (Special appearance)

== Soundtrack ==
1. "Awaz Do Phir" Mohammed Aziz
2. "Bhagya Devta" Mohammed Aziz
