= Yaadhumagi Nindraai =

2020 Indian Tamil-language film directed by Gayathri Raguram

- Poster
- Directed by: Gayathri Raguram
- Produced by: Girija Raguram; Suja Manoj
- Starring: Gayathri Raguram
- Cinematography: Vishnu Ramasamy
- Edited by: Raymond Derrick Crasta
- Music by: Ashwin Vinayagamoorthy; Achu Rajamani
- Production company: Suja Movies
- Distributed by: ZEE5
- Release date: 19 June 2020
- Country: India
- Language: Tamil

Yaadhumagi Nindraai is a 2020 Indian Tamil-language film directed by Politician, choreographer and actress, Gayathri Raguram, who also plays the lead role. In the film, she plays Thamarai, a background dancer who aspires to become an actress. The film was released on ZEE5 after much delay. This film marks the directorial debut of Raghuram.

== Cast ==
- Gayathri Raguram as Thamarai
- Vasanth Kumar as Prasad
- Sindhu Krishnan as Sophia
- Nivas Adithan as Ganesh
- Latha Balakrishnan
- Abhishek Vinod

== Reception ==
Cinema Express gave the film one-and-a-half out of five stars and wrote that " Despite the many issues that the film tries to address, what we get from all of this is only an outward display of the woman’s struggles and a voice that falls flat". Dinamalar gave the film a rating of 2.5 out of five.
