= Punnagai Mannan =

1986 film by K. Balachander

- Theatrical release poster
- Directed by: K. Balachander
- Written by: K. Balachander
- Produced by: Rajam Balachander; Pushpa Kandaswamy
- Starring: Kamal Haasan; Revathi
- Cinematography: R. Raghunatha Reddy
- Edited by: Ganesh–Kumar
- Music by: Ilaiyaraaja
- Production company: Kavithalayaa Productions
- Release date: 1 November 1986
- Country: India
- Language: Tamil

Punnagai Mannan (transl. King of smiles) is a 1986 Indian Tamil-language musical romantic drama film written and directed by K. Balachander. The film stars Kamal Haasan and Revathi in the lead roles, with Srividya, Rekha, Delhi Ganesh, Sudarshan and Sundar Krishna Urs in supporting roles. Its plot revolves around a man who, after surviving a suicide attempt that killed his lover, finds new love, but their romance faces obstacles.

Haasan pitched to Balachander a story based on a true incident about two lovers' attempted suicide, with only the male surviving. Balachander expanded this story to make Punnagai Mannan. The film was released on 1 November 1986, Diwali day, and ran for over 25 weeks in theatres, becoming a silver jubilee hit.

== Plot ==
Lovers Sethu and Ranjani arrive at a cliff, where they plan to commit suicide due to opposition to their planned marriage from Ranjani's parents, who rejected Sethu, the son of a drunkard cook, as groom. Ranjani's parents threatened they would kill Sethu or commit suicide. Both Sethu and Ranjani jump from the cliff; Sethu becomes trapped in a tree and survives while Ranjani dies. Despite Ranjani's father's attempts to have Sethu jailed by framing him for having killed Ranjani, there is no evidence to prove it. Sethu is arrested for having attempted suicide.

A year later, Sethu is released. His well-wisher Padmini, who owns a dance school, provides him a job of dance instructor. Sethu regularly visits the cliff in remembrance of Ranjani. On his way there, he sees a girl who attempts suicide and stops her. He later meets the girl in a gallery; when where she introduces herself as Malini, Sethu ignores her. Malini again meets Sethu at a tourist spot where she photographs him without his knowledge. Sethu realises this and destroys her camera. Malini chases Sethu to his school as his student. Sethu repeatedly insults Malini but she falls in love with him.

Malini coincidentally meets Sethu's uncle "Chaplin" Chellapa, who dresses like Charlie Chaplin, and learns of Sethu's failed relationship, which increases her affection for Sethu. Chellapa helps her to win Sethu's affection. Malini is Sinhalese, because of which she faces trouble from her classmates, from which Sethu rescues her. Though Sethu regularly humiliates Malini, he begins to like her, and later realises he has started to love her. At the cliff, Sethu takes a sign of blessing from Ranjani for his new love from Ranjani, and confesses his love for Malini and proposes to her.

Malini continues to spend time with Chellapa, whose sense of humour she enjoys. This makes Sethu jealous so he attempts to mimic Chellapa's mannerisms but injures himself. Sethu finds out about Chellapa's own failed relationship, which he tried to forget by wearing a mask of Chaplin. Sethu and Malini unite Chellapa with his former lover Padmini, who never married. Sethu again experiences pressure from Malini's father because Malini is Sinhalese and Sethu is Tamilian. Malini travels from Sri Lanka to Tamil Nadu to join Sethu. Understanding the tight bond between Malini and Sethu, Malini's father approves their marriage.

Ranjani's father hears about Sethu's marriage and intends to kill him. On the day of Sethu's engagement, he gives Sethu's father a basket of apples in which a time bomb is placed, pretending it is a gift for his son. Sethu's father places the basket in Chellapa's car, in which Sethu and Malini leave to visit Sethu's cliff. Learning of the bomb's presence, Sethu's father and Chellapa try to stop Sethu and Malini but the explosion kills the couple. Chellapa later places flowers on the cliff, the place of their deaths.

== Cast ==
- Kamal Haasan in dual role as:
  - Sethu
  - "Chaplin" Chellapa
- Revathi as Malini (Voice dubbed by Sulakshana)
- Srividya as Padmini
- Rekha as Ranjani (Voice dubbed by K.R. Anuradha)
- Delhi Ganesh as Sethu's father
- Sudarshan as Ranjani's father
- Sundar Krishna Urs as Malini's father
- Charle as Father
- Babu Mohan
- Hussaini as a Sri Lankan Tamil
- Sundar as a dance student
- C. I. D. Sakunthala
- K. S. Jayalakshmi as Malini's mother
- Baby Kalpana as a little girl in a store

== Production ==
=== Development ===
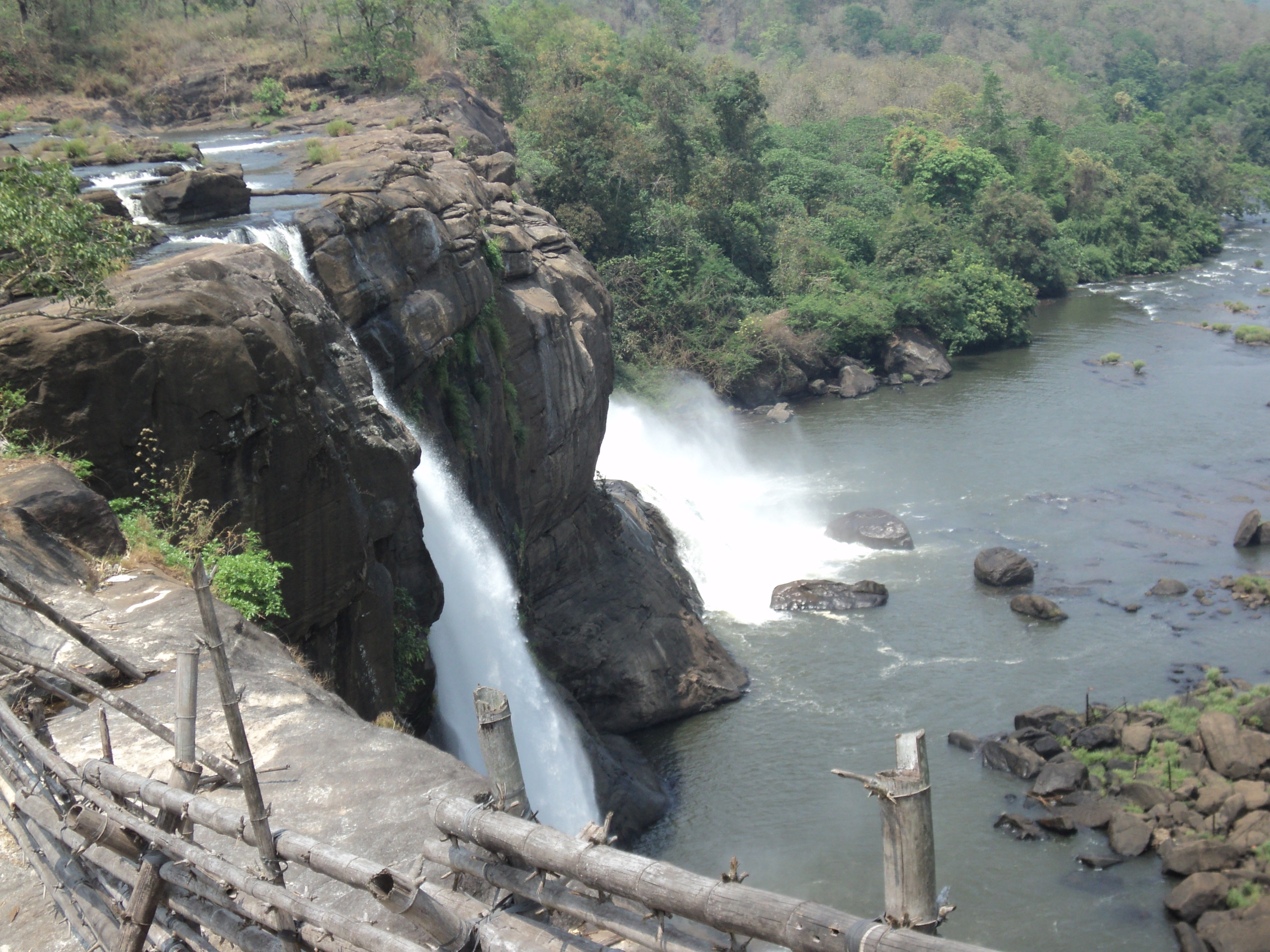
Athirappily Falls, where many scenes were shot.

K. Balachander, who directed the Telugu film Maro Charitra (1978) and its Hindi remake Ek Duuje Ke Liye (1981), wondered what a new story would be like if it starts from the end of Maro Charitra. Kamal Haasan, who starred in both films, pitched to Balachander a story based on a true incident about two lovers attempting suicide via poison, with the male surviving and the female dying. Balachander used these plot elements to make a film in Tamil titled Punnagai Mannan. By contrast, R. Sundaramoorthy said the film began production in 1978 with Poornima Jayaram but was subsequently dropped. Balachander described Punnagai Mannan as a contrast to Ek Duuje Ke Liye because it "was in response to people who argued why lovers should commit suicide".

=== Casting and filming ===
Haasan was cast in two roles; Sethu, and his uncle "Chaplin" Chellappa. Revathi was cast as Malini, a Sinhalese girl, and her voice was dubbed by Sulakshana. Rekha's character was named Ranjani after the Carnatic raga of the same name. G. M. Sundar made his feature-film debut as a dance student. Ramesh Aravind was cast as Malini's lover in flashbacks, but his scenes did not make the final cut.

Many scenes of Punnagai Mannan were filmed at Athirappilly Falls at Chalakudy, Kerala in 27 days. Balachander suggested Kala as a dance choreographer to fill in for Raghuram, her brother-in-law who was busy. Suresh Krissna, who worked as an assistant director, said of the picturisation of the song "Mamavukku", Haasan had the novel idea of lip sync being perfect while dance movements are fast. Krissna later used this idea in one of the song sequences in his film Annaamalai (1992). Stills Ravi worked on the production as a stills photographer.

The film includes a scene in which Haasan and Rekha, who was 16 years old at the time, kiss. In a 2019 interview, Rekha stated she was not told of the kiss before filming the scene. During the filming, Haasan suddenly grabbed and kissed Rekha on her lips. After the shoot, Rekha protested and asked to remove the scene but the crew did not comply. After Rekha's revelation, many people, including singer Chinmayi Sripada, considered Haasan's actions an act of sexual harassment.

== Soundtrack ==
Ilaiyaraaja composed the soundtrack for Punnagai Mannan and Vairamuthu wrote the lyrics for most of the songs. A. R. Rahman, who was then known as Dileep, played synthesizer on the soundtrack. Punnagai Mannan was one of the earliest Tamil films in which a sequencer was used. According to Ilaiyaraaja's son Karthik Raja, a Yamaha CX5M system was used around the time of the making of the film.

== Release and reception ==
Punnagai Mannan was released on 1 November 1986, Diwali day. The film faced issues with the censor board, who cut roughly 500 feet (150 m). On 14 November, The Indian Express wrote, "though the film was captivating, it did not seem to have much value as a thing of the past, as memory. And that is because both the plot and character are one-dimensional". Jayamanmadhan of Kalki negatively reviewed the film, particularly the climax, comparing it unfavourably with Balachander's earlier films. Despite competition from other Diwali releases including Maaveeran, Palaivana Rojakkal, Aruvadai Naal and Kannukku Mai Ezhuthu, Punnagai Mannan became a silver jubilee hit, running for over 25 weeks in theatres.

== Other versions ==
Punnagai Mannan was later dubbed into Telugu as Dance Master and into Hindi as Chacha Charlie.

== Bibliography ==
- Krissna, Suresh; Rangarajan, Malathi (2012). My Days with Baasha. Westland Ltd. ISBN 978-93-8162-629-0.
- Kamini, Mathai (2009). A. R. Rahman: The Musical Storm. India: Penguin Books. ISBN 978-0-670-08371-8.
- Ramachandran, Naman (2014) [2012]. Rajinikanth: The Definitive Biography. Penguin Books. ISBN 978-81-8475-796-5.
