= Radiopetti =

- ரேடியோப்பெட்டி
- Directed by: Hari Viswanath
- Written by: Hari Viswanath
- Produced by: HarryToonz Studio
- Starring: Lakshmanan; TVV Ramanujam; Shobana Mohan; Nivas Adithan
- Cinematography: Saravanan Natrajan
- Edited by: Venkatram Mohan
- Music by: Richard Ford
- Production company: HarryToonz Studio
- Release date: 2015
- Running time: 83 minutes
- Country: India
- Language: Tamil

Radiopetti (transl. Radio Set) is a 2015 Indian Tamil-language drama film directed by Hari Viswanath, starring Ramanujam TVV and Lakshmanan Koratur.

The film became the first Tamil film to win the KNN Audience Award in the official competition in Busan International Film Festival 2015, and was an official selection in Indian Panorama for 46th International Film Festival of India held at Panaji, Goa.

== Summary ==
Radiopetti is the story of a 70-year-old man, partially deaf and is extremely fond of the valve radio, a gift by his dad when he was a child and he sees his dad through the radio. He became psychologically disturbed when this radio is lost

== Cast ==
- Lakshmanan as Arunachalam
- Ramanujam TVV as Subramani
- Shobana Mohan as Lakshmi
- Nivas Adithan as Saravanan
- Baby Maya as Tharshini
- Master Rohan as Ashwin

== Production ==
=== Development ===
Hari Viswanath, a civil engineer by profession explained that the idea of making this film struck him only when he saw an old man, who couldn't hear well walking through the street as nobody paid attention to him. This made Viswanath thinking about the lives of elderly people and his own grandfather who always turn on his Murphy Radio as a routine affair. The radio tune signalled all activities of grandfather as well as Viswanath like praying, reading, going to school, time to eat and so on. Viswanath felt the agony of him when he just thought of losing the radio one day and felt the pain on how he will manage after losing the radio. Viswanath decided to mix this fictional thoughts and real experience into a film and thus Radiopetti began its journey.

=== Casting ===
Viswanath signed stage artiste Lakshmanan to play the lead role, Nivas Adithan, who has earlier done Ula and Kaaka Muttai, Shobana Mohan and TVV Ramanujam in important roles. Lakshmanan has already played the lead role in Viswanath's short film Idukkan.

=== Filming ===
Radiopetti was shot in Pondicherry and completed in a 15 days schedule within a budget of one crore.

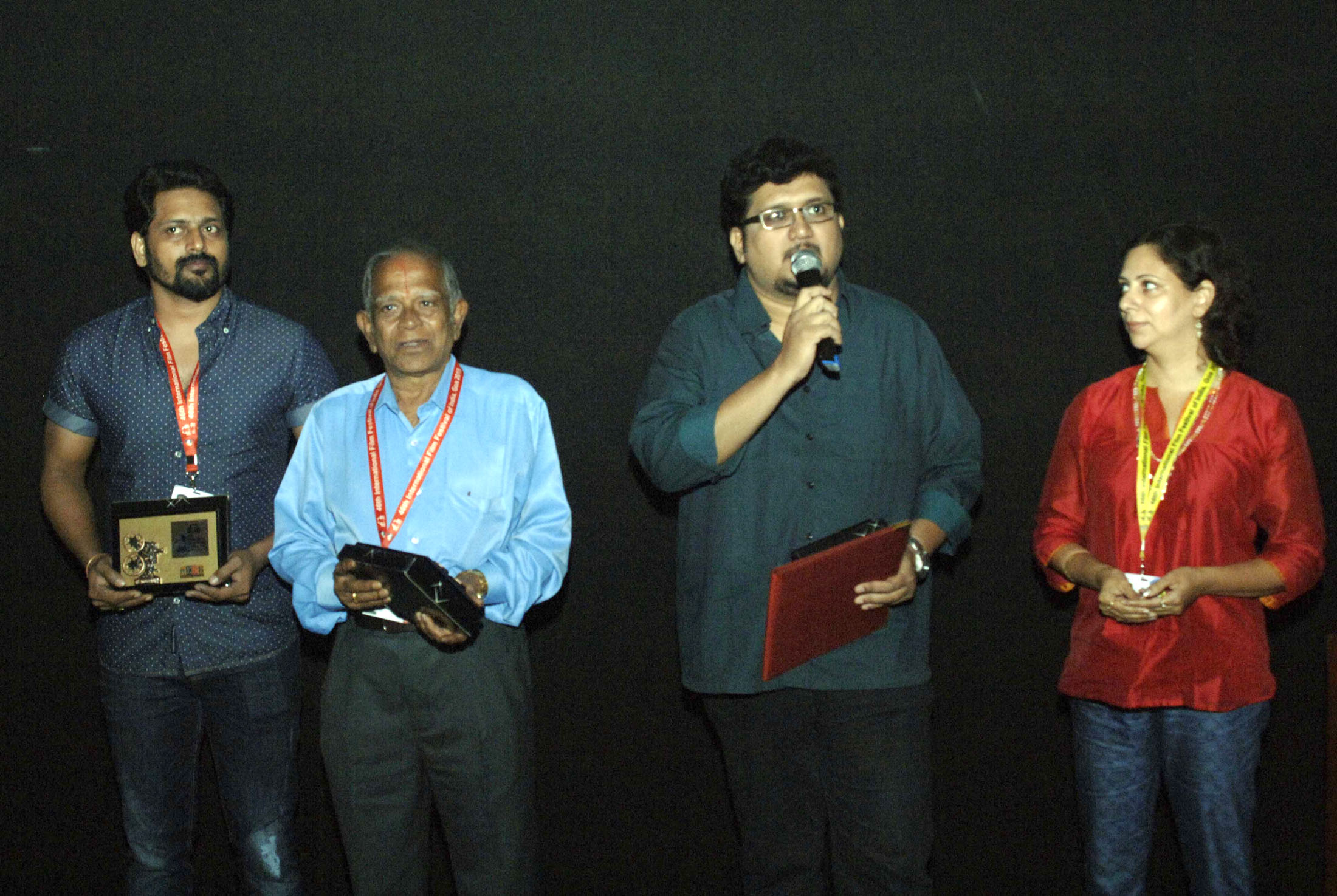
Film crew at IFFI (2015)

== Accolades ==
Year	Festival	Category	Result	Ref.
2015	Busan International Film Festival	Audience Award	Won	
2015	Busan International Film Festival	New Currents	Nominated	
2015	International Film Festival of India, Goa	Indian Panorama	Official Selection	
2016	Imagine India film festival, Madrid, Spain	Best Music	Won	
2016	Imagine India film festival, Madrid, Spain	Best Film	Nominated	
2016	Chennai International Film Festival	2nd Best Film	Won	
2016	Chennai International Film Festival	Special Jury Best Actor	Won	
2016	Chennai International Film Festival	Best Film	Nominated	
2016	Hidden gems film festival, Calgary, Canada	Best Director	Nominated	
2016	Auro film festival, Auroville		Official Selection	
2016	Pune International Film Festival		Official Selection	
2016	Film festival in Romania		Official Selection	
2016	Government of Puducherry 'Indian Panorama' Film Festival	Best Film	Won	
