= Raghuram =

Indian dance choreographer (1949–2013)

- Born: 1 May 1949
- Died: 30 November 2013 (aged 64)
- Other name: Raghuram Master
- Occupation: Choreographer
- Years active: 1949–2001
- Spouse: Girija
- Children: Suja Raguram; Gayathri Raghuram
- Relatives: Krishnaswami Subrahmanyam (grandfather); Padma Subrahmanyam (aunt); Kala (sister-in-law); Brinda (sister-in-law)

Raghuram (1 May 1949 – 30 November 2013) was an Indian dance choreographer, who choreographed more than a thousand songs in Indian films across various languages. He was born into a Tamil Brahmin Iyer family and is the grandson of actor Krishnaswami Subrahmanyam.

== Career ==
Raghuram began learning Kathakali, aged five from prominent dance expert Guru Gopinath, and then in 1956, he switched to learning Bharata Natyam under dancer K. J. Sarasa. He learned dance along with J Jayalalithaa, with the pair both having their arangetram (debut) in 1960. He debut in movies as a child actor in a movie Padikkadha Medhai (1960). It was during a duet performance with Jayalalithaa that Raghuram was asked to assist dance director A. K. Chopra for an M. G. Ramachandran movie. He then started out on his own in 1974 and went on to choreograph Tamil, Telugu, Malayalam and Hindi movies. He debuted choreographer in the Telugu film Kanne Vayasu. He has worked on several films with Kamal Haasan, early on in his career, choreographing celebrated work in Sagara Sangamam (1983) about a classical dancer, and in the romantic Hindi film Ek Duuje Ke Liye (1981).

Raghuram also went on the direct the 1995 Bengali film, Bhagya Debata, starring Mithun Chakraborty and Rajinikanth. He then featured alongside Kamal Haasan in Dasavathaaram (2008) as Appa Rao, a comedy cop. In 2000, he began work on a film on friendship starring Abbas, Vineeth and his daughter Suja Raghuram, but the film was later shelved. In 2012, an event named Amma Appa Guru Deivam was held to felicitate Raghuram's fiftieth year in the film industry. The event, heralded a success by the media, featured dance performances from actors and speeches from other film personalities.

== Personal life ==
Raghuram was born into an Iyer family and is the grandson of Krishnaswami Subrahmanyam, a Tamil film director of the 1930s, while his aunt Padma Subrahmanyam is a prominent classical dancer. Raghuram married Girija, another choreographer, and helped her sisters Jayanthi, Kala and Brindha make their breakthrough in the industry. He has two daughters, who are also involved in the film industry. His first daughter, Suja Raghuram, appeared in Kannada and Malayalam language films while also being a prominent television actress. Gayathri Raghuram, his second daughter, has also appeared in films as an actress and a choreographer.

== Death ==
Raghuram died on 30 November 2013, following a heart attack at his Chennai home.

== Filmography ==
=== As actor ===
Year	Film	Role	Notes
1960	Padikkadha Medhai		
1991	Gnana Paravai	Aandavar	
1996	Avvai Shanmughi	as himself (special appearance)	
1998	Kavalai Padathe Sagodhara		
2008	Dasavathaaram	Appa Rao	
2009	Ananda Thandavam	as Rathna's father	

=== As director ===
Year	Film	Language	Ref
1985	Viswanathan Velai Venum	Tamil	
1995	Bhagya Debata	Bengali	

=== As choreographer ===
Year	Film	Language	Ref
1986	Punnagai Mannan	Tamil	

=== As producer ===
Year	Film	Language	Ref
1982	Maattuvin Chattangale	Malayalam	
1983	Uruvangal Maralam	Tamil	
1984	Jayankara	Kannada	

== Award ==
Tamil Nadu State Film Awards

Year	Film	Category	Outcome	Ref
1992	Thevar Magan	Best Choreographer	Won	
