= Gayathri Raguram =

Indian politician and actress (born 1984)

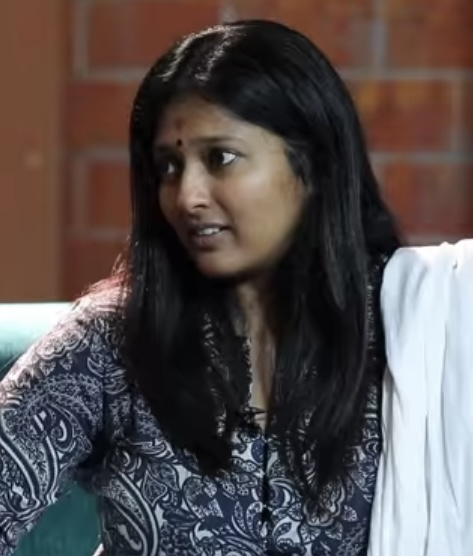
- Gayathri in 2021

Deputy Secretary of the AIADMK Women's Wing
- Incumbent
- Assumed office 2 March 2024 Serving with V. M. Rajalakshmi
- General Secretary: Edappadi K. Palaniswami
- Secretary: B. Valarmathi

Personal details
- Born: 22 April 1984 (age 42) Madras, Tamil Nadu, India (present day Chennai)
- Party: All India Anna Dravida Munnetra Kazhagam
- Other political affiliations: Bharatiya Janata Party (2014–2023)
- Spouse: Deepak Chandrasekhar (m. 2006; div. 2010)
- Parent: Raghuram
- Relatives: Krishnaswami Subrahmanyam (great-grandfather); Padma Subrahmanyam (grand-aunt); S. Krishnaswamy (grand-uncle); Kala (aunt); Brinda (aunt); Keerthi Shanthanu (cousin)
- Occupation: Actress, politician, choreographer

Gayathri Raguram (born 22 April 1984) is an Indian politician and deputy secretary of the AIADMK women's wing. Previously, she was a dance choreographer and actress who worked in the South Indian film industry.

== Personal life ==
Gayathri was born in a Tamil Brahmin Iyer family as the second daughter to dance choreographers Raghuram and Girija Raghuram. Her elder sister Suja is a dancer, who has also previously worked as an actress. She is the great-granddaughter of director Krishnaswami Subrahmanyam. Her mother, Girija comes from a family of choreographers, which includes Brinda and Kala.

=== Drunk and driving case ===
Gayathri was booked for a drunk and driving case in November 2019 by Abhiramapuram Traffic Control Police. Police reported that she left a party from a hotel in MRC Nagar organized for film personalities and was on her way home when she was intercepted by the police, she admitted that she had drunk alcohol when she was asked to blow into the breathing analyzer. A police officer later drove her to her house in Adyar and confiscated her car. A case under Section 185 of the Motor Vehicles Act was filed on her and she was also fined for the incident. Gayathri however claimed it was fake news. This incident drew strong criticism from BJP party cadres.

=== Twitter ===
On 26 October 2020, Raguram was permanently suspended from social media platform Twitter for violating Twitter's rules after posting a series of tweets relating to the controversy over VCK leader Thol. Thirumavalavan's statement on Manusmriti.

== Film career ==
=== Early work and shift to choreography (2001–2016) ===
Gayathri Raghuram started acting at the age of fourteen. Early in her career, she insisted on being known by her full name to avoid confusion with another actress, Gayatri Jayaraman, who was also active in the period.

Her debut film, Repallelo Radha featured her alongside newcomer Dileep. Her next film, Sakthi Chidambaram's comedy drama Charlie Chaplin (2002), featured her in an ensemble cast alongside Prabhu Deva, Prabhu and Abhirami. She was selected for the film after Gayatri Jayaraman opted out of the project. The film enjoyed commercial success, with a critic from The Hindu stating "the new heroine's expertise in dance is particularly impressive". In 2002, she appeared in three more films: the Kannada film Manasella Neene directed by choreographer Sundaram, the Tamil film Style alongside choreographer Raghava Lawrence and the Malayalam film, Nakshathrakkannulla Rajakumaran Avanundoru Rajakumari, where she starred opposite Prithviraj. Her four consequent releases in 2003 fared less well at the box office and failed to garner her more film offers. In concern of her performance in the horror film Whistle (2003), a critic from The Hindu wrote "Gayathri Raghuram's face is and her expressions are just right but rotundity seems to come in the way of wholesome appeal". Likewise, a critic wrote "Gayathri, as the garrulous friend of the hero, begins well, and even when you think she might have a solid role to play, she turns out to be just another weighty heroine in tow", in regard of her appearance in the Arjun-starrer Parasuram (2003). Subsequently, she quit films and relocated to pursue a qualification in Visual Communications in Iowa, USA.

Gayathri returned to the film industry in 2008 as a choreographer with films like Jayam Kondaan (2008) and Poi Solla Porom (2008) and has since worked in big budget productions including Madrasapattinam (2010), Deiva Thirumagal (2013), Osthe (2011) and Anjaan (2014). Her work in the crime thriller Kanthaswamy (2009) and the satire Tamizh Padam (2010) were well received by critics. By 2014, she had choreographed around 100 films and has regularly specialised in working on romantic montages.

Gayatri acted once more in Vai Raja Vai (2015) at the insistence of her friend Aishwarya Dhanush by portraying the sister of the film's lead character Gautham Karthik. Likewise, she made an extended guest appearance in director Bala's village drama Tharai Thappattai (2016), where she also featured in a karakattam-based song. After announcing her intentions of directing a film in 2012, she began work on her first directorial venture Yaadhumagi Nindraai during 2016.

=== Bigg Boss (2017) ===
In 2017, Gayathri was a contestant on the Tamil reality show Bigg Boss hosted by Kamal Haasan. She was evicted from the show o the 56th day, after having attracted widespread criticism for her behaviour inside the Bigg Boss House. In particular, her constant harassment and bullying of contestants Bharani, Julie and then Oviya were widely criticised. A police complaint was filed against her for using derogatory words against Oviya by saying that Oviya has seri behaviour (Slum behaviour) and hurting the sentiment of others, while on the show. Post her appearance on the show, Gayathri returned to choreography, and also appeared as a judge on the television show, Mrs Chinnathirai.

=== Retirement from cinema (2019–2021) ===
In 2020, Gayathri directed her first film titled Yaadhumagi Nindraai where she starred as the main and leading role in the film. The following year she appeared as a special appearance in the Telugu film Rang De, after Rang De she announced her retirement from the film industry as an actress and wanted to focus more on politics.

== Political career ==
=== BJP (2014–2023) ===
Taking office

In November 2015, Gayathri was appointed as Bharatiya Janata Party's secretary for arts in Tamil Nadu. She had earlier joined the party in 2014 in the presence of BJP president Amit Shah.

Gayathri Raghuram was made as president of Arts and Culture Wing of Tamil Nadu BJP in July 2020.

Controversy about past

BJP president Tamilisai distanced herself from Gayathri Raghuram in November 2018 when Gayathri landed into a controversy for drunk and driving. Tamilisai told reporters that the actor was no longer a party worker. Gayathri tweeted that Tamilisai threatened and blackmails women. Gayathri has ever since started a campaign against Tamilisai and has gone on television and party members and said that the BJP will grow in Tamil Nadu if the leadership is changed.

Established politician

As the state president of the arts and culture wing, during February 2022, she fired some of her wing's office-bearers and ordered appointment of new executives to replace them allegedly without permission of the party President K. Annamalai. Gayatri Raghuram's arbitrary act caused a controversy. However, Annamalai ordered that Gayathri's announcement is not valid and said that the old executives would continue. Gayathri Raghuram was expelled from the post by Annamalai in May 2022 and was not given any new post. She openly expressed her displeasure on social media, saying she was given the post of language cell convenor, but she turned it down. She said she was "ok" without a posting. She was then appointed as the leader of Tamil development wing of other states and abroad in June 2022.

Gayatri Raghuram in November 2022, condemned the party's OBC state president Surya Siva for abusing and giving death threats to BJP's Minority Morcha leader Daisy Saran, and criticized the party's state president Annamalai for giving the post to Surya Siva. Following this, Annamalai suspended her from the party for six months and issued a statement asking party men to avoid any contact with Gayatri Raghuram for the time due to her continued involvement in tarnishing the name of the party.

Quit politics

She quit the party on 3 January 2023, alleging that 'women in the party' are not safe under Annamalai.

=== AIADMK (2024–present) ===
On 19 January 2024, She joined the All India Anna Dravida Munnetra Kazhagam in the presence of its general secretary Edappadi K. Palaniswami. On 2 March 2024, She was appointed as the Deputy Secretary of AIADMK Women Wing.

== Filmography ==
=== Actress ===
Year	Film	Role	Language	Notes
2001	Repallelo Radha	Radha	Telugu	Credited as Deeksha
2002	Charlie Chaplin	Susi	Tamil	
2002	Manasella Neene	Renuka	Kannada	
2002	Nakshathrakkannulla Rajakumaran; Avanundoru Rajakumari	Aswathy	Malayalam	
2002	Style	Viji	Tamil	
2003	Maa Bapu Bommaku Pellanta	Mohana	Telugu	
2003	Parasuram	Meena	Tamil	
2003	Whistle	Anjali	Tamil	
2003	Vikadan	Gowri	Tamil	
2011	Vaanam	Herself	Tamil	Special appearance in the song "Who Am I?"
2012	Kadhalil Sodhappuvadhu Yeppadi	Yoga Instructor	Tamil	Special appearance in the song "Azhaipaya Azhaipaya"
2015	Vai Raja Vai	Gayathri	Tamil	
2015	Idhu Enna Maayam	Herself	Tamil	Special appearance in the song "Irukkirai"
2016	Tharai Thappattai	Herself	Tamil	Guest appearance in song "Aarambam Aavadhu"
2019	Aruvam	Scientist	Tamil	
2020	Yaadhumagi Nindraai	Thamarai	Tamil	Film released on ZEE5
2021	Rang De	Arjun's sister	Telugu	

=== Director and Producer ===
- Yaadhumagi Nindraai (2020)

=== Choreographer ===
- Jayam Kondaan (2008)
- Poi Solla Porom (2008)
- Panchamirtham (2008)
- Kanthaswamy (2009)
- Kola Kolaya Mundhirika (2009)
- Daddy Cool (2009)
- Madrasapattinam (2010)
- Tamizh Padam (2010)
- Anwar (2010)
- Osthe (2011)
- Makeup Man(2011)
- Salt N' Pepper (2011)
- I Love Me (2012)
- Scene Onnu Nammude Veedu (2012)
- No.66 Madurai Bus (2012)
- Aravaan (2012)
- Kadhalil Sodhappuvadhu Yeppadi (2012)
- Deiva Thirumagal (2013)
- Samsaaram Aarogyathinu Haanikaram (2013)
- SIM (2013)
- Thalaivaa (2013)
- Memories (2013)
- Anjaan (2014)
- Aranmanai (2014)
- To Noora with Love (2014)
- Iyobinte Pusthakam (2014)
- Nimirndhu Nil (2014)
- Kaaviya Thalaivan (2014)
- 100 Days of Love (2015)
- Kadavul Paathi Mirugam Paathi (2015)
- Chandrettan Evideya (2015)
- Ennu Ninte Moideen (2015)
- As I'm Suffering From Kadhal (2017)
- Thalaivi (2021)
- Maha

=== Television ===
- Chinna Chinna Aasai- Uravu (1995) - Baby Pooja
- Jodi Number One
- Dancing Khilladies
- Genes
- Kitchen Galatta
- Koffee with DD
- Odi Vilayadu Pappa (2016)-Judge
- Bigg Boss (2017)-Contestant - Evicted Day 56
- Mrs. Chinnathirai (2017)-Judge
- Divided (2018)-Contestant
- Bigg Boss 2 (2018) - Guest
