= Saguni =

2012 Indian film by Shankar Dayal

- Theatrical release poster
- Directed by: Shankar Dayal
- Written by: Shankar Dayal
- Produced by: S. R. Prabhu
- Starring: Karthi; Pranitha
- Cinematography: P. G. Muthiah
- Edited by: A. Sreekar Prasad
- Music by: G. V. Prakash Kumar
- Production company: Dream Warrior Pictures
- Distributed by: Studio Green; Vendhar Movies
- Release date: 22 June 2012
- Running time: 151 minutes
- Country: India
- Language: Tamil

Saguni is a 2012 Indian Tamil-language political satire film directed by Shankar Dayal (in his directoral debut) and produced by S. R. Prabhu. The film stars Karthi and Pranitha, while Santhanam, Prakash Raj, Kiran Rathod, Kota Srinivasa Rao, Radhika Sarathkumar and Nassar appear in supporting roles. It was released on 22 June 2012 to mixed reviews from critics and had an average run at the box office.

== Plot ==
The film starts with the IRP party's MLA meeting to select their new CM, where prominent leader and veteran Satyamoorthy is unanimously chosen as CM. He is then escorted to his car, where a party cadre accuses him of sexually harassing her by passing on a promiscuous video in a mobile phone. This leads to Satyamoorthy being heavily shunned by the public and causes the suicide of Satyamoorthy and his entire family. This entire sequence is a political plot planned by the same party's influential minister R. K. Boopathi. Two days earlier, Boopathi had asked Satyamoorthy to leave way for him as he has been waiting twenty years to directly become Chief Minister. Boopathi creates a scene at the funeral and then goes on to win MLA by-election in Satyamoorthy's constituency Karaikudi and becomes the Chief Minister of Tamil Nadu.

Meanwhile, Kamalakannan alias Kamal is forcibly taken as a passenger by auto driver Rajini Appadurai near Chennai International Airport, seeing Kamal's rich clothing. Rajini assumes that Kamal is rich and drives him around the city to be profited from him. Kamal is actually a farmer and also runs a free-meal service in his village near Karaikudi. He has come to the capital city to meet concerned politicians and plead them to halt a Railways project, by which he could lose his only ancestral property in his village. He is the grandson of a humble person who serves unlimited food to the guests and passersby every day.

Kamal stays in his paternal aunt Dr. Rani's house, and love blossoms between him and her daughter Sridevi. Their love affair is ended when Kamal promises to forever leave Sridevi on Rani's demand, when Sridevi goes on a foreign tour. Kamal meets Boopathi, who once visited their village during the by-election campaign and had promised to do good deeds when required. Kamal learns that Boopathi is the one behind the project for his mistress, whom he had used to kill Satyamoorthy. Kamal, disillusioned with the system, becomes a shrewd political analyst and campaigner and makes moneylender Ramani the Mayor of Chennai by helping in her campaigns. He later gets the contact of Perumal, who is the leader of the opposition political party. Meanwhile, he joins Perumal's party and makes him win the election, making him the CM of Tamil Nadu. Boopathi is finally arrested for being the reason behind for Sathyamoorthy's suicide with his family. Kamal, at last, saves his property with his intelligence and unites with Sridevi.

== Cast ==
- Karthi as Kamalakannan alias Kannan / Kamal
- Vijay Sri Hari as young Kamal
- Pranitha Subhash as Sridevi
- Santhanam as Rajini Appadurai / Pappu Kumaran
- Prakash Raj as Chief Minister of Tamil Nadu R. K. Boopathi
- Kota Srinivasa Rao as Perumal, Leader of Opposition, and Future CM of Tamil Nadu
- Radhika Sarathkumar as Ramani Aachi, The Mayor of Chennai City
- Nassar as Beedi Saamiyaar AKA Nellai Saamiyaar
- Roja Selvamani as Dr. Rani, Sridevi's mother
- Kiran Rathod as Vasundhara Devi
- V. S. Raghavan as Ramachandran / Thota Raghavaiah Chowdary
- Manobala as Indru Oru Thagaval
- Aadukalam Naren as Boopathi's assistant
- Chitra Lakshmanan as Boopathi's sidekick
- Meera Krishnan as Mobile Court Judge
- Nellai Siva as Policeman
- Chandra Mohan as Satyamoorthy, Former CM of Tamil Nadu (guest character)
- Delhi Ganesh as Lawyer (cameo appearance)
- Devadarshini as CM's daughter (cameo)
- Anushka Shetty as Police Officer N. Anushka (cameo)
- Andrea Jeremiah as Andrea (cameo)
- Vani Shree as Sridevi's friend and Appadurai's love sick
- Blade Shankar as Beedi Samiyaar's assistant

== Production ==
The film was first revealed in early April 2011, when it was reported that Karthi was considering a "social satire" script written by debutant film maker, Shankar Dayal, to be his next venture after the success of his previous film Siruthai. Karthi confirmed the news and revealed he would feature in a new get-up for the film, although expressing that the script was still in development. The film's title is a reference to Shakuni, a character in the Mahabharata. Kannada actress Pranitha who made her debut in Tamil with Udhayan, was confirmed for the lead female role.

Salim Ghouse was initially cast in the film. However, it was later announced that the makers were unimpressed with Ghouse's performance and replaced him with Prakash Raj. Filming began in May 2011. The climax was shot in Hyderabad in December. A song sequence was shot in Poland. There were rumours that the film was based on Neera Radia but the makers denied it. The team shot a scene at the famous shopping complex near Ashok Nagar in Chennai. The director and his crew were happy to complete the shoot before the place got uncontrollably crowded.

== Soundtrack ==
Saguni

Soundtrack album by G. V. Prakash Kumar
- Released: 2 June 2012
- Recorded: 2012
- Genre: Feature film soundtrack
- Length: 24:12 / 24:11
- Language: Tamil
- Labels: Gemini Audio; T-Series
- Producer: G. V. Prakash Kumar

G. V. Prakash Kumar chronology
Endukante... Premanta! (2011)	Saguni (2012)	Joker (2012)

The soundtrack was composed by G. V. Prakash Kumar. The song "Manasellam Mazhaiye" is based on the song "Chalisuva Cheluve" from the Kannada film Ullasa Utsaha composed by Prakash Kumar. The audio launch was to be held on 11 May, but postponed to 2 June. The Telugu version released on 5 June. Two songs along with the videos were launched on 25 May, Karthi's birthday. The song "Kandha Kaaravadai" has been downloaded 75,000 times. Pavithra Srinivasan of Rediff.com wrote that it was "run-of-the-mill and has nothing new to offer". Karthik Srinivasan of Milliblog wrote, "Saguni sees GV Prakash channeling his inner Harris Jeyaraj, particularly the one who works with director Hari".

Track listing
No.	Title	Lyrics	Singer(s)	Length
1.	"Kandha Kaara Vadai"	Paramu	Shankar Mahadevan, Karthi	5:11
2.	"Manasellam Mazhaiye"	Na. Muthukumar	Sonu Nigam, Saindhavi, G. V. Prakash Kumar	5:27
3.	"Vella Bambaram"	Viveka	Baba Sehgal, Priya Himesh	4:43
4.	"Pottadhu Pathala"	Annamalai	Velmurugan & Chorus	4:51
5.	"Annachi Ammachi"	Shankar Dayal	Pushpavanam Kuppusamy, Maya Manikandan & Chorus	4:00
Total length:				24:12

== Release ==
The distribution rights were bought by Vendhar Movies. The film was given a U certificate by the censor board without any cuts. It was initially slated to release in April 2012, but failed to meet the deadline and would be released on 22 June eventually. It was the sole Tamil release of the week, and the media felt this would ensure the film had a "terrific opening". The Telugu rights were bought by Bellamkonda Suresh.

== Critical reception ==
M. Suganth of The Times of India wrote, "While Saguni of the Mahabarata is considered the greatest gambler, this film could be called the great ambler as it coasts along from one plot point to another without really making any significant impression or making you care for its characters". Pavithra Srinivasan of Rediff.com wrote, "Saguni bills itself as a commercial entertainer, a breezy film with funny one-liners that doesn't really take itself seriously. For a spicy mass masala, that's enough". Baradwaj Rangan wrote for The Hindu, "Who writes these things? And why do they have so much contempt for the audience?". Reviewing the Telugu version Shakuni, Idlebrain.com wrote, "Plus points of the film are Karthi and political satires. On the flip side, one-side orientation (no all-round orientation) might make the commercial appeal of the film limited".
