= Kala Master =

Indian dance choreographer (born 1971)

- Born: Kala; 26 March 1970 (age 56); Chennai, India
- Occupations: Dance choreographer; reality television judge
- Years active: 1984–present
- Spouses: Govindarajan (m.1997; div.1999); Mahesh (m.2004–present)
- Children: Vidyuth (b.2007)
- Relatives: Brindha (sister); Raghuram (brother-in-law); Gayathri Raguram (niece); Prasanna Sujit (nephew); Keerthi Shanthanu (niece)

Kala, known professionally as Kala Master, is an Indian choreographer. She is the director and one of the three judges of the Indian reality dance talent show Maanada Mayilada. She was awarded the National Film Award for Best Choreography in 2000 for her folk dance sequences in the Malayalam film, Kochu Kochu Santhoshangal. She is also classically trained in Bharatanatyam, Kuchipudi and Kathak dance forms.

== Career ==
A trained classical dancer with the Nritya Kalanithi award for Bharatanatyam in 1990, Kala, a school dropout, entered the film industry through the influence of her brother-in-law, the choreographer Raghuram. Making her debut as an assistant choreographer at the age of 12 in 1982, she got a break during the making of Punnagai Mannan (1986) starring Kamal Haasan and Revathi, as director K. Balachander suggested Kala fill in for the busy Raghuram. She was then chosen again by Balachandar as the lead choreographer for Pudhu Pudhu Arthangal (1989).

She has since worked in over 4,000 songs in various languages including Tamil, Telugu, Malayalam, Hindi, Kannada, Oriya, Bengali, English, Italian and Japanese. She has referred to the song "Kozhi Koovum Neram achu" in Azhagan as one of her leading pieces of work and also called actress Bhanupriya as her favorite dancer. She was handed the opportunity to choreograph the Miss World 1996 beauty pageant held at Bangalore for which she received a special award of excellence. Moreover, she notes that a stage event in Malaysia featuring Prashanth and seven heroines, propelled her to fame. She was awarded the National Film Award for Best Choreography in 2000 for her folk dance sequences in the Malayalam film, Kochu Kochu Santhoshangal. She became the first to start a cinematic dance school named Kala's Kalalaya which has five branches in Chennai. She manages it along with her sisters. Kala's merit is in popularising a peculiar dance form, cobbled together with borrowings from classical, Indian folk, bhangra and western steps. She also won the Tamil Nadu State Film Award for Best Choreographer for her work in Chandramukhi.

She has since gone to specialise in directing dance reality shows, notably Maanada Mayilada, which has finished nine seasons.

== Selected filmography ==
=== Choreographer ===
Movie	Song	year	Ref.
Punnagai Mannan	Choreographer	1986	
Pudhu Pudhu Arthangal	Choreographer	1989	
Chandramukhi	Choreographer	2005	
Darbar	Choreographer	2020	
Kaathu Vaakula Rendu Kaadhal	Actor	2022	

=== Singer ===
Movie	Song	year	Ref.
Thiru Vi Ka Poonga	"Naalai Ellam Nalam"	2015	

== Personal life ==
Kala's elder sister, Jayanthi, first started dancing and acted as heroine in two films – Uthiripookkal and Poottatha Pookkal. Kala’s second sister Girija learned Bharatanatyam at Kalakshetra; and went on to work with choreographers Thangam and later Raghuram Master, whom she married afterwards, and also become an independent choreographer. Kala was the sixth daughter, while Brinda, a leading choreographer, is her youngest sister.

Kala was previously married to Govindarajan, the brother of actress Sneha.

== Television ==
Year	Show	Role	Channel
2006	Jodi Number One (season 1)	Judge	STAR Vijay
2006	Super Dancer	Judge	Amrita TV
2007	Super Dancer 2	Judge	Amrita TV
2007	Super Dancer JUNIOR	Judge	Amrita TV
2008	Odi Vilayadu Papa	Director / Judge	Kalaignar TV
2008–2013	Maanada Mayilada (1-8 seasons)	Director / Judge	Kalaignar TV
2014	D 4 Dance (Season 1)	Judge	Mazhavil Manorama (Malayalam)
2022	Pottikku Potti – R U Ready	Judge	Colors Tamil
