= Deepavali (2007 film) =

- Theatrical release poster
- Directed by: S. Ezhil
- Written by: S. Ezhil; Shankar Dayal (dialogues)
- Produced by: N. Linguswamy; N. Subash Chandrabose
- Starring: Ravi Mohan; Bhavana
- Cinematography: S. D. Vijay Milton
- Edited by: G. Sasikumar
- Music by: Yuvan Shankar Raja
- Production company: Thirupathi Brothers
- Release date: 9 February 2007
- Country: India
- Language: Tamil

Deepavali (transl. Diwali) is a 2007 Indian Tamil-language romantic action film directed and co-written by S. Ezhil and produced by Thirupathi Brothers. The film stars Ravi Mohan (credited as Jayam Ravi) and Bhavana in the lead roles, with Raghuvaran, Lal, Vijayakumar, and Cochin Haneefa in supporting roles. The music was composed by Yuvan Shankar Raja with cinematography by S. D. Vijay Milton and editing by G. Sasikumar. The film was released on 9 February 2007 and became a success.

== Plot ==
Billu is the son of Mudaliar. Mudaliar is much loved and respected by the people of his locality, and Billu is almost like a foster son to everyone there. Billu takes an instant liking for Susi the moment he sets his eyes on her at the railway station. Susi, who has arrived from Bangalore to Chennai, is all set to stay at Settu's place. Settu, who has worked for Susi's father Chidambaram, a dreaded criminal, has earlier changed ways but still respects him. Susi, who has wanted love and concern since she was young, is impressed by the bonding that the Royapuram residents share. When a godman predicts that Susi is the one for Billu, she is taken aback. She dreads her father and fears that things will go topsy-turvy if their relationship blossoms into love. Soon, she realizes she cannot hide her feelings towards Billu and enjoys being in the company of Billu and his friends, but the unexpected occurs.

Susi acts peculiar when a long-lost friend meets her at a restaurant. She denies knowing her, despite her friend Revathi's attempts to talk to her. Feeling insulted, Revathi walks away, much to the dismay and confusion of Billu and his friends. Susi, who gets emotionally high-strung, leaves the restaurant in a jiffy, too. Susi, at this juncture, reveals the truth to Billu. Affected with PTSD after an accident, Susi has forgotten events that happened in a span of three years. Billu, who takes her to Dr. Devasaghayam, learns that this condition can be cured, but when Susi gets cured, she will not be in a position to remember what happened and who she met at Chennai, including Billu.

This greatly disheartens Susi, and she persuades Billu to promise never to leave her, even if she were to forget him due to her condition. Billu promises her that he will never leave her, come what may. Billu's conversation with Chidambaram infuriates the latter, and he immediately arrives in Chennai with his goons. When he is all set to leave for Bangalore with his daughter, the residents rise to the occasion and flock against Chidambaram. Deciding to play it safe, Chidambaram agrees to the engagement between Billu and Susi and cunningly thrashes Billu after making him arrive at a place far from his locality, at the outskirts. The helpless Susi travels along with her father, escorted by his men, to Bangalore.

When Billu meets Susi at her residence, he gets nothing less than shocked as she has been cured, and she fails to recognize him, but Billu, who had given the word to his beloved that he would never leave her, is not the one to relent. In the end, he tries relentlessly to convince her, going to the extent of bringing her to Royapuram despite her resistance. Chidambaram comes there with his men, and a fight ensues. Billu is disheartened as Chidambaram drags Susi away, as Susi gets surprised by Billu and the Royapuram residents' behavior towards her earlier. She leaves her father's hands and suddenly runs to Billu. Billu becomes elated that Susi has regained her memories, but Susi reveals that she does not remember anything but believes whatever he says about her life in Chennai. They finally reunite.

== Cast ==
- Ravi Mohan as Billu Mudaliar
- Bhavana as Susi Chidambaram
- Raghuvaran as Dr. Devasaghayam (guest appearance)
- Lal as Chidambaram, Susi's father
- Vijayakumar as Mudaliar, Billu's father
- Cochin Haneefa as Sait
- Manobala as Villager
- Vaiyapuri as Villager
- John Amirtharaj
- Bose Venkat as Bangalore DCP Kempaiah Shetty
- Mahanadi Shankar as Soosai
- Besant Ravi as Billu's accomplice
- N. Radhakrishnan
- Ghajini Rajesh
- Devadarshini as Sumathi
- Jhanavi as Billu's mother
- Meenal as Revathy, Susi's friend
- Krishnamoorthy as Villager
- Robo Shankar as Billu's friend
- Funky Shankar [Malaysia] as Billu's friend
- Maaran as Billu's friend
- Cool Suresh as Billu's friend
- Lollu Sabha Udayakumar as a beeda seller
- Maayi Sundar
- Soori as Fish Seller
- Appukutty as Soosai's henchman
- Kadugu Ramamoorthy
- Kovai Senthil
- Suseenthiran as Thief

== Production ==
Deepavali was the first film to be produced by N. Lingusamy under his production company Thirrupathi Brothers. Some scenes and songs were shot at a set resembling Royapuram, consisting of houses, petty shops, and lanes. A duet was shot in Oman.

== Soundtrack ==
The music of Deepavali was scored by Yuvan Shankar Raja. The soundtrack was released on 5 January 2007, and was a major success upon release.

Track listing
No.	Title	Lyrics	Singer(s)	Length
1.	"Dhol Bhaje"	Na. Muthukumar	KK, Shweta Mohan	4:26
2.	"Kadhal Vaithu"	Na. Muthukumar	Vijay Yesudas	5:08
3.	"Kannan Varum Velai"	Yugabarathi	Madhushree, Anuradha Sriram, Bhavatharini	3:54
4.	"Pogadhey Pogadhey"	Na. Muthukumar	Yuvan Shankar Raja	5:30
5.	"Thoduven"	Kabilan	Maya, Haricharan, Raju Krishnamoorthy	5:47
Total length:				24:45

== Critical reception ==
Shwetha Bhaskar of Rediff.com wrote "On the whole, park your logic at the door and enjoy Deepavali". Sify wrote, "On the whole Deepavali is a heartless love story". Malini Mannath of Chennai Online wrote, "If there is any respite in the movie, it is the Ravi-Bhavana team who spares no effort to make their interactions lively and watchable. Otherwise 'Deepavali' is a vain attempt at re-lighting yesterday's burnt-out sparklers!". Lajjavathi of Kalki praised the acting of Jayam Ravi, Bhavana and other actors while also praising the comedy, cinematography, music, dialogues and art direction and director Ezhil for narrating a complex plot smoothly while calling the climax as natural.
