= Anbudan DD =

- Genre: Talk show
- Directed by: Johnny D'Souza
- Presented by: Divyadarshini
- Country of origin: India
- Original language: Tamil
- No. of episodes: 16

Production
- Camera setup: Multi-camera
- Running time: approx. 40–45 minutes per episode

Original release
- Network: Vijay TV
- Release: 1 April – 22 July 2017

Anbudan DD (transl. With Love DD) is an Indian Tamil-language talk show which aired on Star Vijay every Saturday at 18:00 (IST) from 1 April 2017 and 22 July 2017. The show is a continuation to the show Koffee with DD, and is hosted by Divyadarshini.

== Host ==
- Divyadarshini: who had appeared in many Tamil Shows Host, reality shows and Serials on television like Thadayam, Ahalya, Selvi, Arasi, Jodi Number One, Airtel super singer T20 and Koffee with DD.

== List of Episodes ==
Episodes	Celebrities	Notes	Surprise Guest	Telecast date
01	Sivakarthikeyan	Tamil film actor, comedian, television presenter, playback singer	Robo Shankar	1 April 2017
02	Arya	actor, producer	Shanthi	8 April 2017
03	Vijay Sethupathi	actor, producer, lyricist, dialogue writer	Bobby Simha	15 April 2017
04	Revathi	Actress, director, social worker		22 April 2017
05	Ramya Krishnan	Actress	Sidney Sladen	30 April 2017
06	Samuthirakani	Actor, director, screenwriter, Social activist	Vikranth	7 May 2017
07	Sneha & Prasanna	Actor	Her Family	13 May 2017
09	Jiiva	Actor, film producer	M. Rajesh	20 May 2017
09	RJ Balaji	RJ, Comedy Actor	A. L. Vijay	27 May 2017
10	Venkat Prabhu	Actor, film director, film producer, playback singer, screenwriter, lyricist		3 June 2017
11	Vikram Prabhu, Manjima Mohan		Movie Launching	10 June 2017
12	Jayam Ravi	Actor		24 June 2017
13	Jyothika	Actress	Nagma and with Her Mother and Friends	1 July 2017
14	R. Madhavan	Actor		8 July 2017
15	Shruti Haasan	Actress		15 July 2017
16	Anirudh Ravichander	Singer		22 July 2017
