= Gowri (TV series) =

- Genre: Drama; Mythology
- Written by: V. padmavathy Tamizhmaran Ashokan (dialogues)
- Screenplay by: V. padmavathy (1-300) Muthusamy Sakthivel
- Directed by: Parmeshwar
- Starring: Samyuktha; Naresh Eswar; Nandini; Puja
- Country of origin: India
- Original language: Tamil
- No. of seasons: 01
- No. of episodes: 775

Production
- Producer: M. B. Gowrish
- Cinematography: P. A. Muthukumaran; Munish M. Ishwaran
- Editor: R. P. Manikandan
- Camera setup: Multi-camera
- Running time: 22-25 mins per epi
- Production company: Rambo Visual Works

Original release
- Network: Kalaignar TV
- Release: 22 January 2024 – 25 July 2026

Gowri is a 2024 - 2026 Indian Tamil-language Mythology television series starring Sujitha in an extended cameo appearances, followed by Samyuktha, Nandini and Naresh Eswar in lead roles. Directed by Parmeshwar, the serial revolves around the life of Durga, a young girl whose fate is shaped by divine forces and human greed.

The show was produced by M. B. Gowrish under Rambo Visual Works. It premiered on Kalaignar TV from 22 January 2024 replacing the serial Vamsam, and ended on 26 July 2026, and airs from Monday to Saturday at 20:00. It is also shown on Kalaignar TV's YouTube channel.

== Plot ==
The series revolves around the journey of a young girl from the small Village Durga (Puja), the human form of the goddess, as she is divinely protected by Goddess Masaniamman against enemies who seek her destruction. The story revolves around Durga, evil her husband`s family.

== Cast ==
=== Main ===
- Samyuktha as Gowri
- Nandini (2024-2025) / Puja as Durga and Kanaga (2025-2026)
- Naresh Eswar as Ashok
- Priyanka Nalkari as Manga (2026)

=== Supporting ===
- Sathish as Aavudaiyappan
- Anju as Akila
- Venkatesh Venki as Deva
- Swetha as Sathya
- Mahesh as Arjun
- Ravi Rahul as Janarathanan
- Tanuja as Kaveri
- Thalapathy Dinesh as Kalan - Kalaputhir
- Punitha (2024-2025) / Vimalaish (2025)
- Anisha Shetty as Maya
- Gracy Thangavel as Draupadi Devi(2026)
- Akshitha Bopaiah as Rukmani(2026)

=== Cameo Appearances ===
- Sujitha as Karumariamman and Advocate Karpagambal and SP Ulaganayagi
- Laavanya
- Mounika Subramanyam as DSP Nandini
- Raaghav
- Preetha
- Papri Ghosh as DSP Umaiyaal
- Indhu Chowdhary

== Production ==
=== Development ===
After the drama Kannedhirey Thondrinal, Rambo Visual Works decide to produce a Mythology series 'Gowri'. It was the second serial production on Kalaignar TV of Rambo Visual Works. The first promo was released on 2 January 2024.

=== Casting ===
Actress Sujitha was cast as goddess Karumariamman and in May 2024 was cast as Karpagambal in cameo appearances. Nandini was cast in the female lead role of Durga. However, in December 2025, she committed suicide because of personal problems, and is replaced by Puja. Naresh Eswar plays the male lead alongside her. Baby Samyuktha was cast as Gowri is young version of Goddess Amman.

In August 2024, actress Mounika was joined as DSP Nandini. In July 2025, actress Indhu Chowdhary was cast in a special appearance. In In the same month, Punitha quit the show, she was replaced by actress Vimalaish. In 2026, actress Priyanka Nalkari was cast in an important role.
