= Nanjupuram =

2011 film by Charles

- Film poster
- Directed by: Charles
- Written by: Charles
- Produced by: Preetha
- Starring: Raaghav; Monica
- Cinematography: Antony
- Edited by: R. Sankar; V. Baalu
- Music by: Raaghav
- Production company: Ilusionz infinite
- Distributed by: Sri Thenandal Films
- Release date: 1 April 2011
- Country: India
- Language: Tamil
- Budget: ₹1.65 crore

Nanjupuram is a 2011 Indian Tamil-language thriller film directed by Charles, starring Raaghav and Monica in the lead roles, while Thambi Ramaiah and Aadukalam Naren play supporting roles. The film, which features music scored by Raaghav himself, was produced by his wife Preetha. It was released on 1 April 2011.

== Plot ==
Nanjupuram is a small village in Tamil Nadu surrounded by hills full of poisonous snakes. The village has two big shots: the village president and a good man who has a son named Velu. The president has an affair with the mother of a woman named Malar, and he often comes to Malar's house.

One day, while treating a snake-bitten girl from the village, the fearless Velu takes her to the opposite side of the hill, across the snakes. Malar also accompanies him. After getting treatment, Malar and Velu fall in love with each other. One day, when Malar is bathing with her friends in the river, a snake tries to attack her. Just then, Velu arrives and stamps the snake. The snake is brutally injured in its neck. The snake then slithers off, leaving Velu's parents and others struck with fear, as hurt snakes would take revenge on the assailant by killing them within 40 days of the attack. They build Velu a hut above 30 feet with dug land beneath it, but Velu often comes down and goes to the riverside at night to meet Malar when the guards are asleep.

One day, Velu's father finds out about this and asks the president to warn Malar. The president goes to her house and threatens Malar and her mother, demanding that Malar quickly find a bridegroom. They arrange her marriage, but Malar is unhappy with it. At the same time, Velu is threatened by the same snake returning and trying to kill him, so he does not go to meet Malar at the riverbanks. One day, when Malar's engagement is also over, she asks Velu's friend, a thief, to speak to him and ask him to come and meet her. The thief tells Velu that Malar is waiting for him and that the snake's return and all is just a fear. Velu strengthens his heart and goes to Malar, while the thief distracts the guards and makes them chase him. Velu and Malar decide to go out of the village to get married.

Just then, the snake comes and chases them. At the same time, the villagers realize their escape and search for them around the village. When the snake is about to kill Velu, the sun rises, marking the end of the 40th day; thus, the snake leaves. Unfortunately, the president and his henchmen find out about Malar and try to kill her. Velu shields her but gets attacked and dies. After Velu's death, Malar bears his child and gives birth to it. The film closes with Velu's young son playing with snakes, just like his dead father.

== Cast ==
- Raaghav as Velu
- Monica as Malar
- Thambi Ramaiah as the president of Nanjupuram
- Aadukalam Naren as Velu's father
- Priya
- Anuya Bhagvath in a special appearance

== Production ==
After director Charles and actor Raaghav decided to make Nanjupuram, they were able to raise funds upto ₹2 lakh (equivalent to ₹4.5 lakh or US$4,800 in 2026) through crowdfunding facilitated by their mutual friends; Raaghav's wife Preetha produced the film. Numerous snakes from different regions were brought in for filming. Both trained snakes and wild, untrained ones were used by the makers. Monica, the lead actress, had no difficulty filming around snakes, in part because of her experience on the survival reality series Anu Alavum Bayamillai. The story revolves around the protagonist having to spend 40 days in the eponymous village, but scenes related to the character's stay there on the first and fortieth day were shot in four successive days; Raaghav lost a substantial amount of weight to look "weak and worn out" for his character's fortieth day.

== Soundtrack ==
The soundtrack was composed by Raaghav, the lead actor. It is his first full-length film album after he composed one song for Yai! Nee Romba Azhaga Irukey! (2002).

Track listing
No.	Title	Singer(s)	Length
1.	"The Warriors Rap"	Raaghav	5:04
2.	"Thelaga Kottudhamma"	Archith, Preetha S.	4:45
3.	"Oorula Unakkoru Medai"	Pushpavanam Kuppusamy	5:33
4.	"Yaavarum"	Preetha S.	3:48
5.	"Anbe Unna"	JSK Sruthi, Kavitha	3:10
6.	"Yennatuma Vaanathula"	Raaghav	4:41
Total length:			27:01

== Release and reception ==
Nanjupuram was released on 1 April 2011 by Sri Thenandal Films. The New Indian Express wrote, "With a small budget, little-known actors and a debutant director at the helm, the film delivers much more than what one might expect." Writing for Sify, Udhav Naig wrote that Charles "needs a pat on the back for his efforts to showcase the perils of the society, in a rather highly fictional set up. Perhaps, a bigger budget, and a better back ground score (Raghav himself) would have enormously helped this film". Writing for Firstpost, Nandini Sen Gupta considered the film a success because of the popularity of snake-themed films in Indian cinema.
