= Nala Damayanthi (2003 film) =

2003 film by Mouli

- Theatrical release Poster
- Directed by: Mouli
- Written by: Kamal Haasan; Mouli
- Story by: Kamal Haasan
- Produced by: Chandra Haasan; Kamal Haasan
- Starring: R. Madhavan; Geetu Mohandas; Shrutika; Sriman; Anu Hasan
- Cinematography: Siddharth
- Edited by: Raja Mohammad
- Music by: Ramesh Vinayakam
- Production company: Raaj Kamal Films International
- Release date: 12 June 2003
- Running time: 138 minutes
- Country: India
- Language: Tamil

Nala Damayanthi is a 2003 Indian Tamil-language romantic comedy film directed by Mouli, and written and produced by Kamal Haasan. The film stars R. Madhavan in the lead role, with Geetu Mohandas and Shrutika playing supporting roles. The film follows the story of a naive Tamil cook stuck in Australia. It was released on 12 June 2003 to positive reviews. Madhavan later reprised his role in the film's Hindi remake Ramji Londonwaley (2005).

== Plot ==
Ramji Narayanaswami Iyer, a naive and docile Tamil Brahmin cook, dreams of marrying off his sister Bhagyam to a good family, as they are orphans and it becomes his sole responsibility. As per convention, he has to shell out dowry for the marriage and somehow falls short of the agreed sum. Incidentally, the groom's family happens to admire the food cooked by Ramji and plans him to send to Melbourne, Australia as a cook for a multimillionaire Australian-based Indian family. In return, he has to send part of his salary as compensation for the dowry he owes.

The millionaire dies of indigestion the day Ramji arrives, leaving him jobless and without his passport and visa, which had been stolen. Desperate to stay and earn, he starts working illegally as a cook in an Indian hotel owned by an NRI Badri, but to stay on, he needs to get a legal work permit as the immigration police are on his heels. Ivan, Badri's cunning lawyer friend, explains to him that the only way out is marriage with an Australian citizen. Ramji reluctantly agrees for a fake marriage with Ivan's fiancé Damayanthi, a free-spirited motorbiker of Sri Lankan Tamil Christian background, and they get married over the weekend. For all these gimmicks, Ivan charges heavy fees from Badri and deposits in the joint account of his with Damayanthi. Ramji converts to Christianity, becoming Robert, and then moves into Damayanthi's house.

The police believes this is a fake marriage and decides to refer the matter to the consulate. Constant stalking by the police forces the couple to stay together to avoid detection by authority. Damayanthi is initially troubled with the rural mannerisms of Ramji. To break the ice, Ramji cooks delicacies for Damayanthi and wins her heart. Over a period of time, with information from Ramji’s acquaintances Damayanthi realises that Ivan is fooling around with her with plans to usurp her money and properties.

Meanwhile, Ramji is not able to send the dowry installments as promised and Bhagyam’s in-laws throw her out. Damayanthi handles this situation smartly, sends all the money received for the fake marriage in their joint account to Bhagyam, and makes sure that Ramji’s trusted long-time friend takes care of Bhagyam after her marriage has ended. In their final confrontation with the consulate, Ramji emotionally answers more than he is asked at the immigration office, then is deported to India. Damayanthi eventually comes along to Palakkad and the film ends with a happy note where couple starts a restaurant. Actors Kamal Haasan and Jayaram come to inaugurate their restaurant and wish the couple luck.

== Cast ==
- R. Madhavan as Ramji Narayanaswami Iyer "Ramji"
- Geetu Mohandas as Damayanthi (Voice dubbed by Anu Hasan)
- Shrutika as Malathi
- Sriman as Badri
- Anu Hasan as Ammulu
- Dhivyadharshini as Bhagyam
- T.S. Ranganathan as Bhagyam's husband
- Bruno Xavier as Ivan (Voice dubbed by Thalaivasal Vijay)
- Mark Jensen as Hector
- Delhi Ganesh as Ramji's uncle
- Manobala as Passport Officer
- Mouli as Immigration Officer
- Santhana Bharathi as Flight Passenger
- Gurpreet Singh Dipak as Bhupinder (Customs Officer)
- Sashikumar as Kicha
- Bala Singh as Chettiyar
- Madhan Bob as Ramji's cousin
- Vaiyapuri as Ramji's cousin
- T. P. Madhavan as Bhagyam's father-in-law
- Bombay Gnanam
- Jeeva Iyer as Priest
- Kamal Haasan as himself
- Jayaram as himself
- Nassar as himself
- Vikram Dharma as Australian NRI (special appearance)

== Production ==
Kamal Haasan had written the script with himself in mind to play the lead role in the late 1990s, but never got down to making it because he felt it would not have been cost-effective. Through the project, he had aimed to reprise his character of the Palakkad Brahmin cook Kameshwaran from Michael Madana Kama Rajan (1990) and place him in funny situations occurring in a foreign country. The plot was reportedly based on Green Card (1990). He had briefly considered making the film in early 1999 with the title of Londonil Kameshwaran after Marudhanayagam had run into production troubles, but instead chose to prioritise his commitments for Hey Ram (2000). After the profitable Pammal K. Sambandam (2002), Mouli asked Kamal Haasan to re-collaborate with this particular script but Kamal Haasan was uninterested. R. Madhavan was selected by Kamal Haasan to replace him, after the pair had shot for Anbe Sivam together in the period. Geetu Mohandas was signed in February 2003 after Mouli had seen her picture in a magazine, and thus she made her comeback to the Tamil film industry after having appeared as the child in the 1988 film, En Bommukutty Ammavukku. While casting for the role of the lead actress, the makers had made several broadcasts over Radio Australia without success. Mouli had been insistent on casting a new actress in Tamil and subsequently considered Malayalam actresses Kavya Madhavan and Navya Nair before finalising Mohandas. The actress was also recommended to the team by actor Jayaram. Bruno Xavier, an Australia-based Sri Lankan Tamil actor, was selected to play the antagonist's role after a successful audition.

The film was shot predominantly in Sydney and Melbourne, Australia in February and March 2003 to make most of the daylight hours. Anu Hasan, daughter of producer Chandra Haasan as well as the niece of Kamal Haasan, helped with production duties and cut costs of the team's shoot in Australia, as well leading post-production works while also provided voice for the film's lead actress Geethu.

== Soundtrack ==
Nala Damayanthi

Soundtrack album by Ramesh Vinayakam
- Released: 10 May 2003
- Recorded: 2003
- Genre: Feature film soundtrack
- Length: 28:22
- Language: Tamil
- Labels: Ayngaran Music; An Ak Audio
- Producer: Ramesh Vinayakam

Ramesh Vinayakam chronology
University (2002)	Nala Damayanthi (2003)	Azhagiya Theeye (2004)
External audio
- Audio Jukebox on YouTube

The film's music was composed by Ramesh Vinayakam, which is his third Tamil project he signed. Actor Kamal Haasan sang an English folk song, titled "Stranded On The Streets", which was written by Pradeep Govind. The remaining songs were written by Vaali.

The soundtrack for the film was released on 10 May 2003. The album got positive reviews with the songs "Stranded On The Streets" and "Enna Ithu".

Track list
No.	Title	Lyrics	Singer(s)	Length
1.	"Thirumaangalya Dharunam"	Vaali	Sujatha Mohan, Sriram Parthasarathy, Saijanani	4:45
2.	"Pei Muzhi"	Vaali	Sharath, Sindhu	5:47
3.	"Sudupattadha"	Vaali	Kamal Haasan	6:18
4.	"Enna Ithu"	Vaali	Ramesh Vinayagam, Chinmayi Sripaada	5:14
5.	"Stranded On The Streets"	Pradeep Govind	Kamal Haasan	6:18
Total length:				28:22

== Release and reception ==
The film was a success at the box office and performed well in multiplexes across Chennai. Sify gave a verdict that the film was a "comedy caper" and a "clean comedy with some warm moments". The Hindu called the film a "decent offering", adding that "a logical storyline and a well thought out script by Kamal Hassan are definite scoring points that sustain viewers' interest till the end". Visual Dasan of Kalki wrote "Nala Damayanthi directed by Mouli is a homely kheer that is loved by everyone as it is chiseled out with a chisel without even an iota of drama". Chennai Online wrote "It was meant to be a hilarious scenario, but doesn't quite turn out that way". Cinesouth wrote "If you had gone to the theatres expecting the magic of Mouli, then, you would have had a rude shock. [..] the film would have been more interesting if Kamal had worked on the script and screenplay". Indiainfo wrote "NALADAMANTHI, a romantic comedy set in Australia, is neither perfect romantic love story nor comedy film; this kichidi is not that much taste. It offers only mild comedy. Though it has some hilarious moments, it lacks consistancy [sic] in the screenplay, which is major obstacle in the smooth flow of the story. Yet, the film is worth a watch as it offers a different kind of story".

Kamal Haasan stated that he intended of remaking the film in Hindi, with the title of Maharaj, but the project did not take off. Madhavan later wrote and starred in a Hindi version, Ramji Londonwaley, which released in September 2005.
