= Raaghav =

Indian actor

- Born: Venkataraghavan Ranganathan; Madurai, Tamil Nadu, India
- Occupations: Actor, music composer, anchor
- Years active: 2002–present
- Spouse: Preetha (m. 2002)

Venkataraghavan Ranganathan, better known as Raaghav on screen, is an Indian actor, television personality and musician in Tamil Nadu. Before his break into films, he appeared in season 1 of Jodi Number One.

== Career ==
Beginning his career with supporting roles in various films, he debuted as a lead actor in Nanjupuram. A gold medalist from College of Engineering, Guindy, Chennai (class of 1995), he pursued further studies at the University of Illinois Urbana-Champaign before returning to Chennai to work as a software engineer. Driven by his passion for media, he later transitioned to a career in acting.

He married his TV co-star Preetha. He and his wife appeared together in Jodi Number 1 in STAR Vijay and Maanada Mayilada in Kalaignar TV. In both the reality shows they were the 1st runner up.

== Filmography ==
Year	Film	Role	Notes
2002	Yai! Nee Romba Azhaga Irukke!	Raaghav	uncredited role; also composer for song "Oru Kadhal Vandhucho"
2002	Five by Four	Avinash	English film
2006	Jerry	Gausik	
2006	Vattaram	Vetrivel	
2007	Satham Podathey	Bhanu's brother	
2008	Chakkara Viyugam	Bose	
2008	Silambattam	Veeraiyan's son	
2010	Enthiran	Rowdy	
2010	Naane Ennul Illai	Ranjith	
2011	Nanjupuram	Velu	also music composer and producer also singer for songs "Warrior Rap" and "Ennattuma Vaanathula"
2011	Velayudham	Jai	
2011	Mambattiyaan		Cameo appearance
2012	Unnil Tholaindhein	Sivakumar	
2013	Naan Rajavaga Pogiren	Boxer	Cameo appearance
2013	Kalyana Samayal Saadham	Gowtham	
2017	Ticket	Avinash Ravichander	Also writer and director
2020	Dots		Malayalam film
2021	V	Madhav	
2021	Operation JuJuPi		
2026	Beep		

== Television ==
Serials

Year	Title	Role	Language	Channel
2002	Jee Boom Ba		Tamil	Vijay TV
2003	Alaigal	Raja/Rangarajan	Tamil	Sun TV
2008	Simran Thirai		Tamil	Jaya TV
2009	Arasi	Chezhiyan	Tamil	Sun TV
2012	Pillai Nila	Santhosh	Tamil	Sun TV
2018	Azhagu		Tamil	Sun TV
2020	Sembaruthi	JK	Tamil	Zee Tamil
2021	Anbe Vaa	Rahul	Tamil	Sun TV
2021	Pandavar Illam		Tamil	Sun TV
2022	Sevanthi	Mano	Tamil	Sun TV
2023	Geethanjali	Karthik	Telugu	Gemini TV
2023	Seetha Raman	Dance Master	Tamil	Zee Tamil
2023	Thavamai Thavamirunthu		Tamil	Zee Tamil
2023	Kannedhirey Thondrinal	Surya	Tamil	Kalaignar TV
2024	Gowri		Tamil	Kalaignar TV
2025	Sandhya Raagam	Muthuselvan IPS	Tamil	Zee Tamil

Shows

Year	Title	Role	Channel
2006	Jodi No.1	Contestant	Vijay TV
2007	Maanada Mayilada	Contestant	Kalaignar TV
2010	Rani Yaaru Raja Yaaru	Contestant	Sun TV
2015	Dance Jodi Dance	Contestant	Zee Tamizh
2021	Rowdy Baby	Contestant	Sun TV
2022	Vanakkam Tamizha	Guest	Sun TV
2022	Maathi Yosi	Contestant	
2026	Bigg Boss season 10	Contestant	Vijay TV
