= Indira (1995 film) =

1995 film by Suhasini Maniratnam

- Poster
- Directed by: Suhasini Maniratnam
- Screenplay by: Suhasini Maniratnam; Mani Ratnam
- Story by: Suhasini Maniratnam
- Produced by: G. Venkateswaran
- Starring: Arvind Swamy; Anu Hasan; Radharavi; Nassar; Janagaraj
- Cinematography: Santosh Sivan
- Edited by: B. Lenin; V. T. Vijayan
- Music by: A. R. Rahman
- Production company: GV Films
- Distributed by: Aalayam Productions
- Release date: 11 May 1995
- Running time: 137 minutes
- Country: India
- Language: Tamil

Indira is a 1995 Indian Tamil-language drama film co-written and directed by Suhasini Maniratnam. It features Arvind Swamy with Anu Hasan (Suhasini's cousin) in the title roles, Radharavi, Nassar and Ashwini. A. R. Rahman composed the film's score and soundtrack, while Santosh Sivan handled the film's cinematography.

== Plot ==
The film revolves around a group of villagers from Maranur, India, and their clash with a neighbouring village leader as their community begins to prosper. Soon, money and greed threaten a will for peaceful coexistence between the two rivalling communities. The main theme involves the role of the caste system and how the younger generation strives to overcome it.

== Cast ==
- Arvind Swamy as Thiyagu
- Anu Hasan as Indira
- Nassar as Sethupathy
- Ashwini as Soundaravalli Sethupathi's wife
- Radha Ravi as Kotamarayar
- Janagaraj as Accountant
- P. L. Narayana as Rajamanickam
- Chandrahasan as Minister
- Viji Chandrasekhar as Shanmugam's secret concubine
- Pasi Sathya as Villager
- T. V. Varadarajan as Government employee
- Monica as Younger Indira
- Crazy Venkatesh as Nallamuthu
- S. Lalitha as Indira's aunt
- Sempuli Jagan as Marimuthu
- Pravin as Shanmugam
- Ravi Shankar as Pichaimuthu
- Singapore Manimaran as Villager
- Shobana as Pregnant woman
- Vishnu Kumaraswami as Younger Thiyagu
- Priya V as a college student (cameo appearance; uncredited)

== Production ==
Suhasini offered the title role – Indira, to her cousin Anuradha, daughter of producer Chandrahasan, and the actress has since noted that "it was a heavy subject for a newcomer. But I was moved by the story line and there were occasions when I was overwhelmed with emotion. Not once did I use glycerine for tearful scenes". V. Priya worked as an assistant director during the making of the film.

== Soundtrack ==
Indira

Soundtrack album by A.R. Rahman
- Released: 1995
- Recorded: Panchathan Record Inn
- Length: 24:35
- Labels: Pyramid; T-Series
- Producer: A.R. Rahman

A.R. Rahman chronology
Bombay (1995)	Indira (1995)	Rangeela (1995)
External audio
- Audio Jukebox (Tamil) on YouTube
- Audio Jukebox (Telugu) on YouTube

All lyrics are written by Vairamuthu; all music is composed by A. R. Rahman.

Tamil track list
No.	Title	Singer(s)	Length
1.	"Nila Kaikiradhu" (Female)	Harini	3:22
2.	"Nila Kaikiradhu" (Male)	Hariharan	4:20
3.	"Odakara Marimuthu"	S. P. Balasubrahmanyam, Sirkazhi G. Sivachidambaram	3:57
4.	"Thoda Thoda Malarndhadhenna"	S. P. Balasubrahmanyam, K. S. Chithra	5:07
5.	"Ini Achcham Achcham Illai"	Sujatha Mohan, Anuradha Sriram, G. V. Prakash, Shweta Mohan, Esther	5:17
6.	"Munnerudhan"	T. L. Maharajan, Swarnalatha	2:02

All lyrics are written by P. K. Mishra; all music is composed by A. R. Rahman.

Hindi track list (Released under the title Priyanka)
No.	Title	Singer(s)	Length
1.	"Khili Chandni Hame"	Harini	3:22
2.	"Kili Chandni Hame"	Hariharan	4:20
3.	"Koi Yahan Bhanumati Koi Yahan Roopmati"	Udit Narayan, Mano	3:57
4.	"Thoda Thoda Pyar"	S. P. Balasubrahmanyam, K. S. Chithra	5:07
5.	"Yeh Jaati Paati Kaisi"	Sujatha Mohan, Anuradha Sriram, G. V. Prakash, Shweta Mohan, Aditya Narayan	5:17
6.	"Barasnewali Hai Barkha"	Mano, Swarnalatha	2:02
7.	"Thoda Thoda Pyar-2"	Hariharan, K. S. Chithra	5:07

== Release and reception ==
Indira won two Tamil Nadu State Film Awards, winning Santosh Sivan the award for Best Cinematographer as well as a Special Jury Award for the film itself. R. P. R. of Kalki wrote it is understood that Suhasini has a healthy way of thinking; whether she changes the fate of Tamil cinema or not, it will be favourable if she is not changed. Reviewing the film at the Indian Panorama section of the International Film Festival of India, S. R. Ashok Kumar of The Hindu wrote that "In certain scenes Anuradha Hassan does not look like a new find at all".
