= V (2021 film) =

2021 horror drama film

- Film poster
- Directed by: DaVinci Saravanan
- Produced by: Roopesh Kumar
- Starring: Raaghav; Luthiya
- Cinematography: Anil K Chami
- Edited by: V. T. Sreejith
- Music by: Elango Kalaivanan
- Production company: True Soul Pictures
- Release date: 8 January 2021
- Running time: 114 minutes
- Country: India
- Language: Tamil

V is a 2021 Indian Tamil-language horror drama film directed by DaVinci Saravanan and starring Raaghav and Luthiya in the lead roles. Produced by Roopesh Kumar, it was released on 8 January 2021.

== Cast ==
- Raaghav as Madhav
- Luthiya as Kanika
- Sabitha Anand
- R. N. R. Manohar
- Rishi
- Ashwini
- Nima
- Sathya Das
- Filjiya
- Rineesh
- Divian
- Devasurya

== Release and reception ==
The film was released across theatres in Tamil Nadu on 8 January 2021. National film critic Malini Mannath noted "surprisingly it managed to deliver much more than what one would have expected", adding "with hardly any lagging moments or wasted shots, the crisp story telling keeps one occupied for the most part". A reviewer from Maalai Malar noted that the film was "different". A review from film portal Film News 24x7 was also positive.
