= Pandavar Illam =

2019 Indian television series

- Genre: Family; Drama
- Created by: A.Gurubaran
- Written by: Selvam Subbaiah
- Screenplay by: Selvam Subbaiah
- Directed by: Selvam Subbaiah; O.N. Rathnam; Shiva
- Starring: Papri Ghosh; Aarthi Subash; Krithika Annamalai; Naresh Eswar; Guhan Shanmugam; Nesan Nepolean; Surendar Raaj; Mohammed Absar; Anu Sulash; Anisha Shetty
- Theme music composer: Dhina
- Opening theme: "Aayiram Kaalam"; Pa.Vijay (Lyrics); Mukesh Mohamed & Kavitha (Singers)
- Country of origin: India
- Original language: Tamil
- No. of episodes: 1216

Production
- Producer: Madhumalar Gurubaranm
- Cinematography: Venkatesh
- Editor: Murali Krishnan
- Camera setup: Multi-Camera
- Running time: approx. 22-25 mins per episode
- Production companies: Sun Entertainment; VSAGA Pictures Pvt Ltd

Original release
- Network: Sun TV
- Release: 15 July 2019 – 28 October 2023

Pandavar Illam (transl. The House of Pandavas) is a 2019 Indian-Tamil language TV drama series, which premiered on 15 July 2019 on Sun TV and ended on 28 October 2023, running for 4 years, and digitally streams on Sun NXT. It stars Papri Ghosh, Aarthi Subash, Krithika Annamalai, Naresh Eswar, Guhan Shanmugam, Nesan Nepolean, Surendar Raaj, Mohammad Absar, Anu Sulash and Anisha Shetty. The show is produced by VSAGA Pictures Pvt Ltd.

== Synopsis ==
The huge ancestral house of Periya Sundaram Pandavar (Delhi Kumar) and his five grandsons, Raja Sundaram Pandavar (Nesan Nepolean), Nalla Sundaram Pandavar (Mohammed Absar), Azhagu Sundaram Pandavar (Surendar raj), Anbu Sundaram Pandavar (Guhan Shanmugam) and Kutty Sundaram Pandavar (Naresh Eswar), is strictly barred for women. This 'only men' family takes a vow against marriage, after losing their elder brother, Shiva Sundaram Pandavar (Kamalesh PK)on his wedding day. On the other hand, a district level boxer Mrs. Kayal (Papri Ghosh) has her heart set on marrying Kutty Sundaram Pandavar (Naresh Eswar). The sequence continues with the marriage of all the other brothers, after the marriage of Kutty Sundaram Pandavar (Naresh Eswar), Raja Sundaram Pandavar (Nesan Nepolean) and Anbu Sundaram Pandavar (Guhan Shanmugam) get married. Then, they plan to marry Azhagu Sundaram Pandavar (Surendar raj) who has two choices of marrying Thenmozhi (Sailu Imran / Madhumitha Ilayaraja /Anisha Shetty) sister of Kayal or Rani (Tharshika Dinesh) cousin of Revathy. Finally after a lot of struggles, Azhagu Sundaram Pandavar (Surendar raj) marries Thenmozhi (SailuImran /Madhumitha Ilayaraja /Anisha Shetty). Then, the Grandfather of Pandavas Periya Sundaram Pandavar (Delhi Kumar) goes to a pilgrimage trip to Kasi in North India. Then, the daughter in laws of the house, introduce Maheshwari (Anu Neela) to Nalla Sundaram Pandavar (Mohammed Absar) as his cooking assistant and student. Slowly, they try to make Nalla and maze to get closer but a new character comes into picture, who is Manimegalai alias Roshini (Anu Sulash) A national level shooter and a boxer. Nalla Sundaram Pandavar (Mohammed Absar) starts liking her and they got married. Due to which all the Pandavas lose their house due to an agreement that if Nalla (Mohammed Absar) is not marrying Maheshwari (Anu Neela) then the Pandavas should give their house. So, these people after giving their house, comes to the city of Chennai. Now they start living there happily but also with few problems happening in a normal joint family and now Kayal (Papri Ghosh) and Roshini (Anu Sulash) are pregnant. The rest forms the crust of the story.

== Cast ==
=== Main ===
- Papri Ghosh as Kayalvizhi alias Kayal Kutty Sundaram: Kutty Sundaram Pandavar's wife; Thenmozhi's sister (2019 - 2023)
- Aarthi Subash as Malliga Anbu Sundaram: Anbu Sundaram Pandavar's wife; Shenbagam's sister (2019 - 2023)
- Krithika Annamalai as Revathy Sree Raja Sundaram: Raja Sundaram Pandavar's wife; Rani's Cousin (2020 - 2023)
- Delhi Kumar as Periya Sundaram: The Head of the Pandavas family; Siva Sundaram Pandavar, Raja Sundaram Pandavar, Nalla Sundaram Pandavar, Azhagu Sundaram Pandavar, Anbu Sundaram Pandavar and Kutty Sundaram Pandavar's grandfather (2019 - 2020)
- Naresh Eswar as Kutty Sundaram alias Kutty: KadaiKutty younger son of Pandavas family; Kayal's husband (2019 - 2023)
- Guhan Shanmugam as Anbu Sundaram alias Anbu: fourth son of Pandavas family; Malliga's husband (2019 - 2023)
- Nesan Nepolean as Raja Sundaram alias Rasu: eldest son of Pandavas family; Revathy's husband (2019 - 2023)
- Mohammed Absar as Nallabaagam Samayal Chakaravarthy Nalla Sundaram alias Nalla: second son of Pandavas family; Roshini's husband; Maheshwari's ex-fiancé (2019 - 2023)
- Anu Sulash as Roshini Nalla Sundaram (Manimeghalai): Nalla Sundaram Pandavar's wife (2021 - 2023)
- Surendar Raaj as Azhagu Sundaram alias Azhagu: third son of Pandavas family; Thenmozhi's husband (2019 - 2023)
- Sailu Imran (2019 - 2021) → Madhumitha Ilayaraja (2021 - 2022) → Anisha Shetty as Thenmozhi Azhagu Sundaram alias Thenu: Azhagu Sundaram Pandavar's wife; Kayalvizhi's younger sister (2022 - 2023)
- Rani as Jameen Vedhanayaki Shiva Sundaram alias Vedha: Shiva Sundaram Pandavar's wife; arch-rival of Pandavas family (2019 - 2021; 2023)
- Kamalesh PK as Shiva Sundaram alias Shiva : Raja, Nalla, Azhagu, Anbu and Kutty's elder brother (2019/2023)(Cameo)

=== Recurring ===
- Bharathi Kannan as Athi Veera Pandian: Kayalvizhi and Thenu's father (2019 - 2023)
- Sonia (2019 - 2022) → Swetha as Annapost Mullai Kodi Athiveerapandian: Kayalvizhi and Thenu's mother (2022 - 2023)
- S. N. Parvathy as Pattammal; Kayalvizhi and Thenu's grandmother (2019)
- Kathadi Ramamurthy as Mandhiramoorthy: Revathy's grandfather (2020 - 2023)
- Magima Devi as Sivagami: Revathy's mother (2020 - 2022)
- Tharshika Dinesh as Deivarani "Rani": Azhagu Sundaram Pandavar's ex-love interest and Revathy's cousin (2020)
- David Solomon Raja as Kodeeshwaran: Roshini's father (2021 - 2022)
- Premalatha as Saroja: Roshini's mother (2021 - 2022)
- K. S. Jayalakshmi as Valli Velan: Malliga and Shenbagam's mother (2019 - 2023)
- Vijay Krishnaraj as Velan: Malliga and Shenbagam's father (2019 - 2023) (Dead)
- Swapna Sharath as Shenbagam Shanmugam: Shanmugam's wife; Valli and Velan's daughter; Malliga's sister (2019 - 2023)
- Sharath as Shanmugam: Shenbagam's husband (2019 - 2023)
- Revathy Shankar as Deivanayagi Jameen Amma: Vedhanayaki's mother (2019 - 2021; 2023)
- Raja Senthil as Velu: Vedhanayaki's brother (2019 - 2020)
- Sudha as Selvi Velu: Velu's wife (2019 - 2020)
- Chitra Rebecca as Rambha: Pandavar Illam's house maid (2023)
- Anu Neela as Maheshwari alias Mahesh: Nalla Sundaram Pandavar's ex-fiancé (2020 -2021)
- Hema Srikanth as Kokila Vishwanathan: Maheshwari's mother (2020 - 2021)
- Unknown as Malathi: Raja Sundaram Pandavar's ex-love interest (2019 - 2022)
- Bala as Malathi's husband (2022)
- Surjith Ansary as Santhosh: Kutty's colleague (2023)

=== Special appearances ===
- Sonia Agarwal as Herself (2021)
- Raaghav as Himself (2021)
- Bavithra as Nila (2020)
- Hemanth Kumar as Karthick (2020)
- Vandana Michel as Neelambari (2020)
