= Ticket (2017 film) =

2022 film by Raaghav Ranganathan

- Directed by: Raaghav Ranganathan
- Produced by: Preetha Raaghav
- Starring: Raaghav Ranganathan; Karthik Kumar; Lakshmi Priyaa Chandramouli; Sanam Shetty
- Cinematography: Raja Bhattacharjee
- Music by: Navneeth Sundar
- Release date: 2017
- Running time: 90 mins
- Country: India
- Languages: Tamil; English

Ticket is a 2017 Indian comedy drama film written and directed by Raaghav Ranganathan, and produced by Preetha Raaghav. Shot in Tamil and English, the film features Raaghav in the lead role, alongside Karthik Kumar, Lakshmi Priyaa Chandramouli and Sanam Shetty.

The film was premiered at the London Indian Film Festival in 2017, with screenings held in London, Wembley and Birmingham. The movie was released in India in 2021.

== Cast ==
- Raaghav Ranganathan as Avinash Ravichander
- Karthik Kumar as Athif Hussain
- Lakshmi Priyaa Chandramouli as Shalini
- Sanam Shetty as Ria
- Babloo Prithiveeraj as a Local Don
- Aishwarya as Sona
- Vatsan Chakravarthy as Craig
- Kavithalaya Krishnan as Kumar
- Balaji Venugopal
- Shylaja Chetlur as Priya Francis

== Production ==
The film marked the directorial debut of Raaghav Ranganathan, who revealed that Ticket was a "thriller with a tinge of black humour". Raaghav played the lead role alongside Karthik Kumar, Lakshmi Priyaa Chandramouli and Sanam Shetty. The film began its shoot in mid-2015 and progressed throughout 2016. The title of the film was a play on the Tamil phrase "Ticket Vaangittaan!", alluding to death, a concept explored in the film.

Raaghav worked on the post-production of the film in early 2017, alongside his acting commitments for another project titled Beep.

== Release and reception ==
The film was premiered at the London Indian Film Festival in 2017, with screenings held in London, Wembley and Birmingham. Raaghav had sent the film for consideration to the organisers, and the film was selected to be screened. It became first independent Tamil film to be premiered at the Empire, Leicester Square theatre in London. A reviewer noted "Ticket may not be ground-breaking cinema, but it is the perfect bit of lighter counterbalance to other, more weighty festival offerings, and a solid directorial debut from Raaghav Ranganathan". The film was also appreciated for its pro-LGBT theme.

The film was initially set to have a theatrical release in 2017, but it did not materialise. Libra Productions' Ravindar Chandrasekaran announced that he had procured the rights of the film in March 2018, but the film later did not have theatrical release.
