= Anu Hasan =

Indian-British actress

Anu Haasan
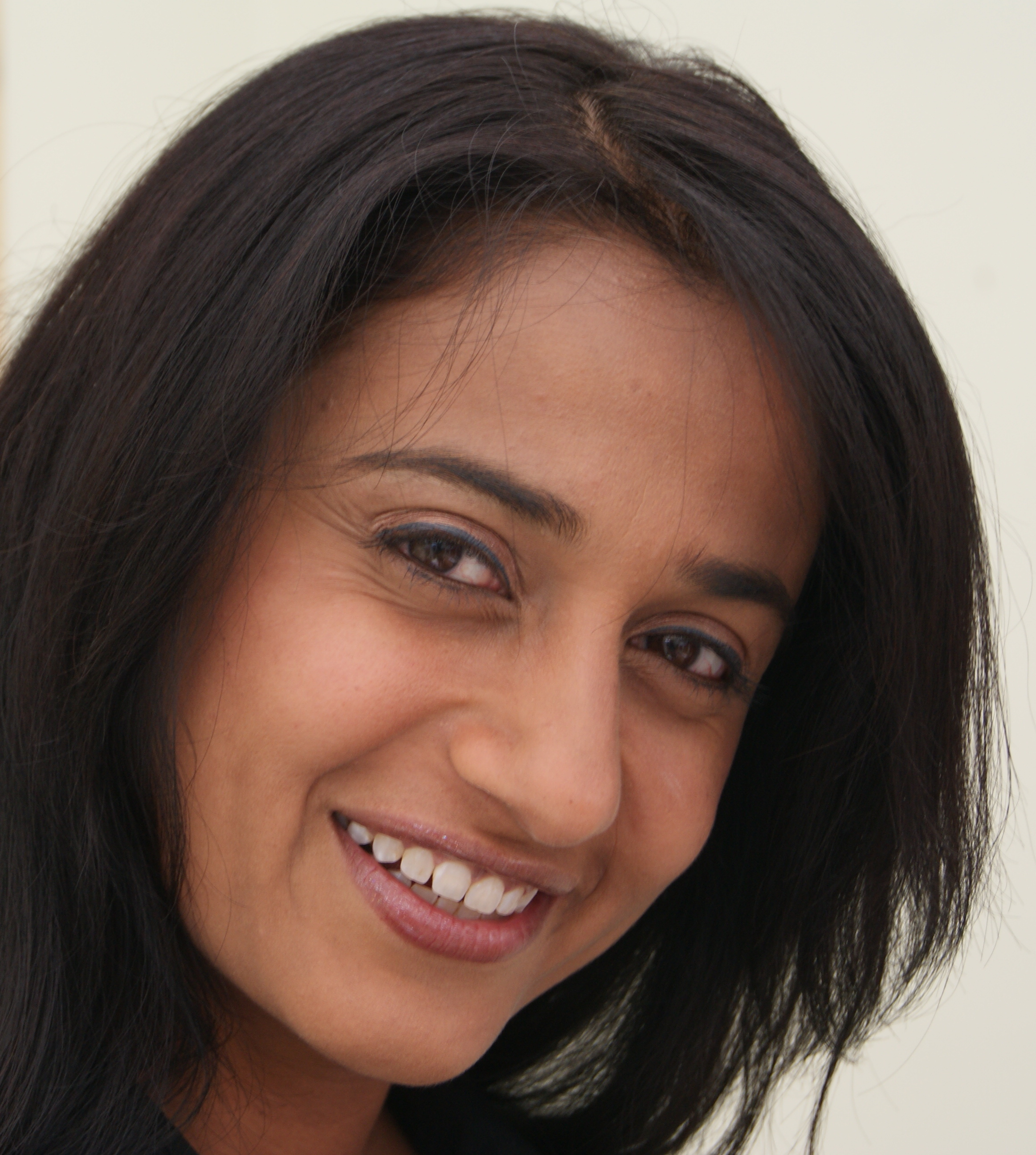
- Anu Hasan in 2012
- Born: Anuradha Chandrahasan; 15 July 1970 (age 56); Tiruchirappalli, Tamil Nadu, India
- Citizenship: United Kingdom
- Education: BITS Pilani
- Occupations: Actress; entrepreneur; presenter; writer; motivational speaker
- Spouse: Graham Jay (m. 2011)
- Father: Chandrahasan
- Relatives: See Haasan family

Anu Hasan (born Anuradha Chandrahasan) is an Indian-born British actress and TV anchor. She works predominantly in Indian and British cinema and television industry. She made her film debut in the critically acclaimed Indira (1995) and has since appeared in many Tamil films, playing minor roles. She hosted the celebrity talk show Koffee with Anu on the Tamil channel Vijay for three seasons.

== Early life ==
Anuradha was born to producer Chandrahasan and did her schooling at St.Joseph's Anglo Indian Girls Higher Secondary School, Trichy and RSK Higher Secondary School and earned a MSc degree in Physics and Management from BITS Pilani (1988–1993).

In 2011, she married British investment banker Graham Jay.

== Career ==
By 2000, she ventured into television, acting first in the series Anbulla Snehgidhiye, which was adapted from Chitra Banerjee Divakaruni's award-winning novel Sister of My Heart. She then starred in a number of TV series like Avan Aval Avargal, Ammaavukku Rendula Raagu and Vivahita (Malayalam), following which she turned anchor for the celebrity talk show Koffee with Anu (named after herself), aired on STAR Vijay. The show, which she hosted for over four years, soon became very popular and made her ultimately a household name in Tamil Nadu.

In 2014 she joined the Ask How India social movement and made a series of videos pertaining to social issues.

In addition, Anu has worked as a dubbing artiste, lending her voice for many non-Tamil-speaking actresses, including Raveena Tandon, Preity Zinta and Geetu Mohandas.

She writes a monthly column for Just for Women (India) magazine.

== Author ==
=== Books ===
- Sunny Side Up (2015) – Self Help English Book.

== Filmography ==
=== Films ===
Year	Title	Role	Language	Notes
1995	Indira	Indira	Tamil	
2001	Aalavandhan/Abhay	Vijay and Nandu's mother	Tamil/Hindi	Guest appearance, Bilingual film
2002	Run	Siva's sister	Tamil	Tamil Nadu State Film Award for Best Supporting Actress
2003	Nala Damayanthi	Ammulu	Tamil	
2003	Anjaneya	Paramaguru's sister	Tamil	
2008	Akku	Anu	Tamil	
2008	Santhosh Subramaniam		Tamil	Guest appearance
2008	Dhaam Dhoom	Sarasu	Tamil	
2009	Sarvam	Geetha Eashwar	Tamil	Guest appearance
2009	Aadhavan	Anu	Tamil	
2009	Evaraina Epudaina	Venkat's sister-in-law	Telugu	
2010	Maanja Velu	Mrs. Bose	Tamil	
2010	Irandu Mugam	Sarveswaran's wife	Tamil	
2010	Thottupaar		Tamil	
2011	Ko	Herself	Tamil	Cameo appearance
2011	Red Building Where The Sun Sets		English	
2012	Endukante... Premanta!	Revathi	Telugu (Note: Simultaneously shot in Tamil titled Yen Endral Kadhal Enben, but the Tamil version never saw a theatrical release.)	
2012	Dead Point	Anwar's mother	Arabic	
2012	Ullam		Tamil	
2013	Kunthapura	Gowri Iyer	Malayalam	
2014	1: Nenokkadine	Kalyani	Telugu	
2017	Valla Desam	Anu	Tamil	
2017	Is This Now	Ms. Murray	English	
2018	Keni	Suganthi	Tamil	
2018	Chi La Sow	Arjun's mother	Telugu	
2019	Vaakku		Malayalam	
2020	Putham Pudhu Kaalai	Saras	Tamil	Amazon Prime film; Segment Coffee, Anyone?
2023	Ustaad	Gayathri	Telugu	
2023	Bubblegum	Ramya	Telugu	
2025	Anaganaga	Rani Amma	Telugu	
2025	Patang	Shekar’s wife	Telugu	

=== Television ===
Title	Genre	Role	Language
Anbulla Snegithiyae	TV series		Tamil
Boom Boom Shakalaka	TV series		Tamil
Ammaavukku Rendula Raagu	TV series		Tamil
Vivahita	TV series		Malayalam
Koffee with Anu	Talk show	Host	Tamil
Rekha IPS	TV series	Rekha	Tamil
Tharkappu Kalai Theeratha	TV series	Appa	Tamil
Anu Alavum Bayam Illai	Reality show	Host	Tamil
En Samayal Araiyil	Reality show	Host	Tamil
Kannadi	Reality show	Host	Tamil
Golmaal Gouramma	TV series		Kannada
Hollyoaks	Soap opera	Kameela	English
Cucumber	Drama	Shoona Merchandani	English
My Jihad – Episodes 3 and 4	Drama	Noor	English
Ackley Bridge	Soap opera		English
EastEnders	Soap opera	Fatima Inzamam	English
Emmerdale	Soap opera		English
Vaanga Pesalam	Talk show	Host	Tamil
Bigg Boss 4	Reality show	Special guest	Tamil

=== Dubbing artist ===
- Preity Zinta (Uyire..)
- Raveena Tandon (Aalavandhan)
- Geethu Mohandas (Nala Damayanthi)
