= Papri Ghosh =

Indian actress

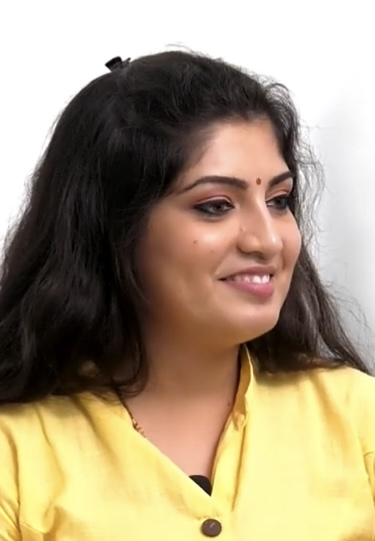
- Ghosh in 2017
- Occupations: Actress, Model
- Years active: 2009–present
- Spouse: Sandip (m. 2020)

Papri Ghosh is an Indian actress who works predominantly in Tamil, Bengali and Telugu films and serials.

== Career ==
Papri played the lead in the serial Pandavar Illam on Sun TV. She played a notable role in Touring Talkies and played minor roles in films like Bairavaa and Viswasam.

== Filmography ==
Year	Film	Role	Language	Notes
2009	Kaalbela	Unknown	Bengali	Uncredited role
2009	Krodh	Diya	Bengali	
2011	Bandhan	Nandini	Odia	credited as Priyadarshini Ghosh
2014	Dillunnodu	Simran	Telugu	credited as Priyadarshini Ghosh
2015	Touring Talkies	Hema	Tamil	Anthology film; segment Love @ 75
2015	Youthful Love	Unknown	Telugu	credited as Priyadarshini Ghosh
2016	Beparoyaa	Brishti	Bengali	
2016	Oyee	Gayathri	Tamil	
2017	Bairavaa	Shailaja Venkatesan	Tamil	
2017	Sakka Podu Podu Raja	Yamini	Tamil	
2018	Sarkar	Sundar Ramasamy's sister-in-law	Tamil	photo role
2019	Viswasam	Priya	Tamil	
2025	Baby and Baby	Manikkam's wife	Tamil	
2026	Parasakthi	Bindya Das	Tamil	

== Television ==
Serials

Year	Serial	Role(s)	Channel	Language
2018–2020	Nayagi	Kanmani	Sun TV	Tamil
2019–2023	Pandavar Illam	Kayalvizhi	Sun TV	Tamil
2020	Poove Unakkaga	Kayalvizhi (Special Appearance)	Sun TV	Tamil
2020	Chithi 2	Kayalvizhi (Special Appearance)	Sun TV	Tamil
2020	Magarasi	Kayalvizhi (Special Appearance)	Sun TV	Tamil
2021	Vanathai Pola	Kayalvizhi (Special Appearance)	Sun TV	Tamil
2022	Aruvi	Kayalvizhi (Special Appearance)	Sun TV	Tamil
2023	Siragadikka assai	Herself (Extended Special Appearance)	Sun TV	Tamil
2023	Kannedhirey Thondrinal	Aradhana (Special Appearance)	Kalaignar TV	Tamil
2023–2024	Sundari	Usha	Sun TV	Tamil
2024	Vontari Gulabi	Roja	Gemini TV	Telugu
2024	Gowri	Umaiyaal	Kalaignar TV	Tamil
2025–2026	Kaathuvaakula Rendu Kadhal	Ramya	Kalaignar TV	Tamil
2026	Karthigai Deepam	Priya	Zee Tamil	Tamil
2026–Present	Siragugal	Bhuvana	Sun TV	Tamil

Shows

Year	Serial	Role	Channel	Language
2020	Vanakkam Tamizha	Guest	Sun TV	Tamil
2021	Rowdy Baby	Contestant	Sun TV	Tamil
2021	Therika Vidalama	Herself	Sun TV	Tamil
2021	Vanakkam Tamizha	Guest	Sun TV	Tamil
2021	Poova Thalaiya	Contestant	Sun TV	Tamil
2021	Vanakkam Tamizha	Guest	Sun TV	Tamil
2021	Natchathira Saval	Herself	Sun TV	Tamil
2022	Vanakkam Tamizha	Guest	Sun TV	Tamil
2022	Maathi Yosi	Contestant	Sun TV	Tamil
2022	Singapenne	Contestant	Sun TV	Tamil
2022	Maathi Yosi	Contestant	Sun TV	Tamil
