= Chellakutti =

- Title card
- Directed by: K. Natraj
- Screenplay by: R. Thyagarajan
- Dialogue by: R. K. Dharmaraj
- Story by: R. K. Dharmaraj
- Produced by: C. Dhandayuthapani
- Starring: Sarath Babu; Sujatha; Ravichandran
- Cinematography: S. R. Govindan
- Edited by: M. G. Balu Rao
- Music by: Gangai Amaran
- Production company: Dhandayuthapani Films
- Release date: 21 October 1987
- Country: India
- Language: Tamil

Chellakutti (transl. Darling) is a 1987 Indian Tamil-language film directed by K. Natraj, written by R. Thyagarajan and R. K. Dharmaraj, and produced by Dhandayuthapani Films. The film stars Sarath Babu, Sujatha and Ravichandran, with Radha Ravi, V. Gopalakrishnan, Vennira Aadai Moorthy, Nalinikanth and Master Tinku in supporting roles. It was released on 21 October 1987.

== Plot ==
Vijay, a forest ranger, is wrongfully convicted for murder after opposing Gopal, a corrupt contractor who is abetted by DSP Rajesh and another forest ranger. Vijay's wife and son are left to fend for themselves but have the support of a child elephant. The family moves to Madras with the elephant. Eventually, the corrupt men are punished.

== Cast ==
- Sarath Babu as Vijay
- Sujatha as Vijay's wife
- Ravichandran as Gopal
- Radha Ravi
- V. Gopalakrishnan as DSP Rajesh
- Vennira Aadai Moorthy
- Nalinikanth as the corrupt forest ranger
- Master Tinku as Vijay's son
- Kovai Sarala
- Disco Shanti as an item girl
- Oru Viral Krishna Rao
- Usilai Mani
- Kullamani

== Soundtrack ==
The music was composed by Gangai Amaran.

Track listing
| No. | Title | Lyrics | Singer(s) | Length |
|---|---|---|---|---|
| 1. | "Chella Kutti Chinna Kutti Yaanai" | Gangai Amaran | K. S. Chithra | 4:50 |
| 2. | "Vaanam Paartha Vaazhapoove" | Pulamaipithan | P. Susheela, Gangai Amaran | 4:35 |
| 3. | "Kama Devanin Kadal Rani" | Na. Kamarasan | K. S. Chithra and chorus | 4:28 |
| 4. | "Thaayum Naane" | Muthulingam | K. S. Chithra | 4:44 |
| Total length: | | | | 18:37 |

== Release and reception ==
Chellakutti was released on 21 October 1987. The Indian Express wrote that the film "portrays the goodness and gratefulness of an elephant, in a very anthropomorphic way", that children would appreciate the fact that the "elephant is seen through very human eyes" and the narrative "is spiced with glamorous dances, songs and fights". Jayamanmadhan of Kalki wrote that the film was too derivative from the films of Sandow M. M. A. Chinnappa Thevar, that Amaran's music had nothing special, and criticised the item number featuring Disco Shanti.
