= Dhivyadharshini =

Indian television host and actress

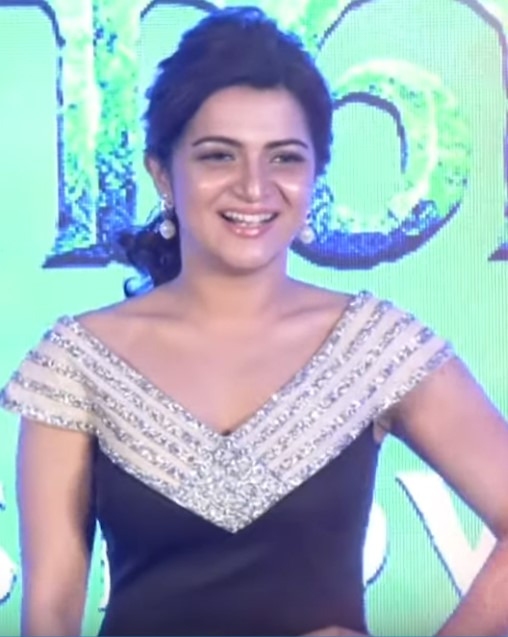
- Dhivyadharshini in 2019
- Born: Dhivyadharshini Neelakandan; February 17, 1985 (age 41); Thanjavur, Tamil Nadu, India
- Education: Our Lady's Matriculation School, Anna Adarsh College for Women
- Occupations: Actress; TV anchor Asst Professor
- Years active: 1990–present
- Known for: Koffee with DD
- Spouse: Srikanth Ravichandran (m. 2014; div. 2017)
- Relatives: Priyadharshini (sister)

Dhivyadharshini (born 17 February 1985), better known as DD is an Indian television presenter, host and actress. She predominantly works in Tamil television and film industry especially in Tamil entertainment. She has hosted numerous television shows such as Koffee with DD, Anbudan DD.

Initially making her debut as an actress, she featured in supporting roles in films including Kamal Haasan's production Nala Damayanthi (2003), before going on to work in television serials, drawing attention for her performances in the Raadan Media ventures Selvi and Arasi. Since 2007, she has regularly been a host for shows on Vijay TV and in 2014, began hosting Koffee with DD, her own show.

== Early life ==
Dhivyadharshini was born to K. Neelakandan and N. Srilatha. Her mother is from Kerala and father is from Tamilnadu. Her sister Priyadharshini is also a television host, while her younger brother is an airline pilot. She attended Our Lady's Matriculation Higher Secondary School and has since has continued part-time education at Anna Adarsh College, Chennai.

== Career ==
Dhivyadharshini made her debut as a television anchor in 1999, when she successfully auditioned to be the child anchor for Vijay TV's Ungal Theerpu. She made a breakthrough as an actress, portraying a serious character in K. Balachander's television serial Rekkai Kattiya Manasu, shown on Raj TV, and subsequently, her performance helped her to popularity and gain further acting assignments. After a few more cameo appearances in films, Dhivyadharshini moved back to television, where she played notable roles in the Raadan Media ventures Selvi and Arase. She has also contributed as a dubbing artist in films, notably voicing Vega Tamotia in Saroja (2008) and Piaa Bajpai in Goa (2010).

Since 2007, Dhivyadharshini has become one amongst the leading TV anchors as featured on Tamil television and has notably continued to host several reality TV shows on Vijay TV. She hosted the initial seasons of Jodi Number One alongside Deepak and Aravind Akash, as well being the initial host of Boys Vs. Girls.

== Personal life ==
She married her longtime friend & assistant director Srikanth Ravichandran. But the couple announced their split in 2017. They filed for divorce in a family court in Chennai subsequently. Dhivyadharshini has rheumatoid arthritis, which prevents her from long-distance walking.

== Filmography ==
Film

Year	Film	Role	Notes
1990	Shubhayathra	Raman's Child	Malayalam film; child actor
2003	Julie Ganapathi	Writer	
2003	Nala Damayanthi	Bhagyam	
2003	Whistle	Saravathy (Sara)	
2003	Five by Four	Namitha	English film
2008	Saroja	Special appearance in the song "Aaja Meri Soniye"	Guest appearance
2017	Pa. Pandi	Poonthendral's daughter	Guest appearance
2019	Sarvam Thaala Mayam	Anjana	
2022	Coffee with Kadhal	Varshini Santhosh	
2024	Joshua: Imai Pol Kaakha	Madhavi	
2026	Dhruva Natchathiram	Madhavi	Awaiting release
TBA	Kaadhal Conditions Apply	TBA	Delayed

Music Videos

List of music video credits as actor
Year	Title	Role	Notes	Ref
2018	Ulaviravu	Divya	Ondraga Original	

== Voice artist ==
Actress	Role	Film	Notes
Vega Tamotia		Saroja	
Piaa Bajpai		Goa	
Piaa Bajpai		Bale Pandiya	
Tulasi		Easan	
Preethi		Appa	
	Anna	Frozen II	Tamil dubbed version

== Television ==
=== Shows ===
Year	Title	Role	Channel
1999	Ungal Theerpu	Host	Star Vijay
2006–2014	Jodi Number One	Host (Season 1–3, 5–7)	Star Vijay
2009	Boys Vs Girls	Host (Season 1,2)	Star Vijay
2012	Jodi Number One	Contestant (Season 4)	Star Vijay
2012	Airtel Super Singer T20	Host	Star Vijay
2013–2017	Koffee with DD	Host	Star Vijay
2016	Achcham Thavir	Host	Star Vijay
2017	Anbudan DD	Host	Star Vijay
2017	Smart Wheel	Guest	Astro Vinmeen HD
2018	Jodi Fun Unlimited	Judge	Star Vijay
2018	Bigg Boss Tamil 2	Guest	Star Vijay
2018–2019	Enkitta Modhaade	Host	Star Vijay
2019–2020	Dancing Super Stars	Judge	Star Vijay
2019–2020	Speed Get Set Go!	Host	Star Vijay
2021	Bigg Boss Tamil 4 Kondattam	Host	Star Vijay
2021	6th annual Vijay Television Awards	Host	Star Vijay
2022	RRR Special	Host	Star Vijay
2022	Galatta Nakshatara Awards	Host	Kalaignar TV
2022	Bigg Boss (Tamil season 6)	Guest	Star Vijay

=== Serial ===
Year	Title	Role	Channel
2002	Irandavathu Kadaimai	Usha	Raj TV
2003–2004	Rekkai Kattiya Manasu	Vidhya	Raj TV
2003–2005	Thadayam	Subha	Sun TV
2004–2005	Ahalya	Gowri	Sun TV
2004–2005	Kanavugal Aayiram	Bharathi	Jaya TV
2005–2006	Selvi	Madhuvanthi	Sun TV
2006–2007	Kolangal	Anjalidevi	Sun TV
2007	Arasi	Madhuvanthi	Sun TV

=== Web series ===
Year	Title	Role	Channel	Notes
2023	Mathagam	Sofia	Disney+ Hotstar	

== Awards ==
=== Vikatan award ===
Ananda Vikatan, one of the leading weeklies of Tamil Nadu has been awarding the films, actors and technicians on various criteria.

Year	Work	Category	Outcome
2011	Home Sweet Home (Vijay TV)	Best Anchor — Female	Won

=== Vijay television awards ===
Year	Award	Category	Result	Notes
2014	Vijay Television Awards	Best Anchor - Female	Won	
2015	Vijay Television Awards	Best Anchor - Female	Won	
