= Akku (2008 film) =

2008 film by Maamani

- Title card
- Directed by: Maamani
- Written by: Maamani
- Starring: Ajay; Sriji; Rakshai; Riyaz Khan; Anu Haasan
- Cinematography: Chitti Babu K.
- Edited by: Gobar B. Venkatesh
- Music by: Sriram
- Production company: On Life Network
- Release date: 22 February 2008
- Running time: 90 minutes
- Country: India
- Language: Tamil

Akku is a 2008 Indian Tamil-language action thriller film directed by Maamani in his debut. The film stars Ajay, Sriji, Rakshai, Riyaz Khan and Anu Haasan, with Ram Khan, Harris, Vijay Kumar, Biju, Radio One Balaji, Jayashree, Lakshmi and Ammu Ramachandran playing supporting roles. It was released on 22 February 2008. The film's title is the name of the last vowel in the Tamil script, ஃ.

== Plot ==
Siva is an IT professional who grew up in an orphanage, and he falls in love with Bhanu. Her brother is a dreaded terrorist leader planning to bomb Chennai. Bhanu elopes with Siva as she is afraid that her brother would not permit their marriage, and they arrive in a forest, but they are soon caught by Bhanu's brother and the members of the terrorist organisation in the middle of the night. Bhanu's brother beats Siva up, takes him to the heart of the city, puts a bomb in his shoe and abandons him. Bhanu's brother tells him to keep running to stay alive. If Siva stops running or slows down, the bomb in his shoe would explode, killing him and also triggering a chain of explosions. The terrorist leader then calls the police, and he sends them a MMS to track down Siva. He also challenges them to save Siva and Chennai city.

A police team is pressed into service to defuse the bomb and save Siva and the city. The assistant commissioner of police Aadhi Narayanan, the bomb squad officer Anu, and the doctor Devi start following Siva in cars. The incident receives heavy media attention, and it is broadcast live by all the news channels. The dawn is coming with the sun, and Siva is exhausted. Meanwhile, Bhanu is locked in a room by her brother in his place and calls the police to save her. Devi ensures that he does not collapse from exhaustion, she provides him with energy tablets and oxygen supply. Anu even scans his shoe for the bomb and finds uranium in his shoe.

The terrorist leader orders the members of his organisation to stop Siva from running, and they try to kill him. The police manage to kill them, but one terrorist shoots with a RPG and the car of Aadhi Narayanan exploded. Aadhi Narayanan is severely injured after the attack. The police catch the terrorist and start torturing him to quickly obtain information from him. Meanwhile, the special force eventually finds out where Bhanu has been kidnapped and saves her. The special force and the terrorist organisation begin to exchange fire in the area. The terrorists, including Bhanu's brother, are killed, and the special force won the battle. Anu decides to defuse the bomb and leads Siva in a remote place where the police set up a treadmill for him. A tired Siva starts running on the treadmill, and Anu, who wears a bomb suit, orders the police to move away from the place. Siva is hooked by a crane and Anu orders him to jump, at that moment, she puts an adhesive surface under his shoes, and the crane lifted him at an unbelievable speed. The shoe soles stick to the adhesive surface tearing up his shoes, and the bomb exploded without causing any casualties. At the hospital, Anu meets an exhausted Siva and his lover Bhanu, and Anu congratulates him for his braveness.

== Cast ==
- Ajay as Siva
- Sriji as Bhanu
- Rakshai as Bhanu's brother
- Riyaz Khan as Aadhi Narayanan
- Anu Haasan as Anu
- Ram Khan as the Police inspector
- Harris
- Vijay Kumar
- Biju
- Radio One Balaji as a Radio jockey
- Jayashree as Devi
- Lakshmi as Priya
- Ammu Ramachandran as Savitha
- Appukutty as Man at the barbershop (uncredited role)

== Production ==
Maamani, who has worked under R. Balu, R. Parthiban and S. P. Jananathan, made his directorial with Akku, named after the last vowel in the Tamil script, under the banner of On Life Network. Newcomers Ajay, Sriji and Rakshai were cast to play the lead roles alongside established actors Riyaz Khan and Anu Haasan. Unlike other Indian films, this was not designed to have an interval, as the director did not want to slow down the screenplay. The camera was handled by Chitti Babu, Sriram composed the background score and G. B. Venkatesh edited the film.

== Critical reception ==
Sify said, "Akku is an attempt at a different type of thriller not seen in Tamil film genre which has human emotions and cinematic heroism to keep the audiences engrossed". S. R. Ashok Kumar of The Hindu wrote, "Sri Ram's background score is noteworthy, while the camera is ably handled by Chittibabu. Maamani should have thought about scripting the story in a more interesting manner to avoid the repetitive shots. Still, it's a bold attempt". Cinesouth lauded the film for its writing and direction, criticising no aspect. Aarani Yuvaraj of Kalki praised director Mamani and team for making a thriller film without any single boring moment.
