= Five by Four =

- Directed by: Roopa Swaminathan
- Screenplay by: Roopa Swaminathan
- Story by: Roopa Swaminathan
- Produced by: Sunit Tandon
- Starring: Divyadarshini; Hardeep Minhas; Preetha; Eashwar Rao; Cary Edwards; Sapna; Usha Seetharam
- Cinematography: Ravi Varman
- Edited by: S. Satheesh; J. N. Harsha
- Music by: Yuvan Shankar Raja
- Production company: National Film Development Corporation of India
- Release date: 2003
- Running time: 86 minutes
- Country: India
- Language: English

Five by Four is a 2003 Indian English film written and directed by Roopa Swaninathan. It stars VJs Cary Edwards, Sapna and Usha Seetharam, Eashwar Rao, television artistes Venkat, Preetha Raaghav and Divyadarshini and popular Kannada model Hardeep Minhas. The music was by Yuvan Shankar Raja and cinematography by Ravi Varman. The film in English was produced by the National Film Development Corporation of India (NFDC). It did not get a theatrical release, but was screened at the Shanghai International Film Festival, the Writers market at Santa Monica, and other venues.

== Cast ==
- Cary Edwards as Nayan
- Eashwar Rao as Ajay
- Venkat as the stranger
- Divyadarshini as Namitha
- Hardeep Minhas as Aishwarya
- Preetha as Shruti
- Sapna as Shikha Iyer
- Usha Seetharam as Meera
- Sujata Panju as Meenakshi
- Biniu Jha as Renu
- Prabhu as Martin
- Amar as Abhijeet

== Production ==
Roopa Swaminathan signed up with Penguin and was writing short stories for a book. She thought the stories could be made into a feature films and approached the National Film Development Corporation of India. The film consists of four stories about a gang of five girls. She first named the film "Five String Quartet". The film was shot entirely in Tamil Nadu. The director planned to shoot the whole film in 25 days, but completed it in 18 days as she had rehearsed with the actors for nearly four months. Swaminathan also wrote about her experience making the film in her book Stardust: Vignettes from the Fringes of Film Industry, which won the National Film Award for Best Book on Cinema.
