= Tinku (actor) =

Indian actor

- Born: Arunkanth; 13 August 1978 (age 48)
- Other names: Master Tinku, Trilok
- Occupation: Actor
- Spouses: Supriya (m. 2000; div. 2009) Kavitha (m. 2010)
- Children: 1
- Relatives: Sonia (sister); Bose Venkat (brother-in-law)

Tinku (born 13 August 1978) is an Indian actor. He began his acting career as a child artist and went on to act in films until he was 13. Other than acting, he is also the winner of the second edition of Jodi Number One, a dance-based reality television show.

He resides in Atlanta, Georgia, where he operates Tinku Dance Academy with his wife and daughter.

== Controversy ==
Prior to the release of the film Motta Shiva Ketta Shiva (2017), Tinku released a video on Facebook alleging that composer Amresh Ganesh had stolen a song titled "Hara Hara Mahadevaki" from a film that he and Robert were making titled Thaathaa Car-ai Thodadhae. Tinku alleged that Amresh had worked together with them to create the song during early 2015, but production troubles had shelved the film and subsequently Amresh had taken the song to a different project. In a press meet in February 2017, Amresh Ganesh refuted the claims and provided evidence of Tinku and Robert continuously trying to scam him by gathering funds for the shelved project. Amresh stated that he had developed the song free of cost and had paid for the duo to take part in a failed shoot of the song in Bangkok, before the film was stalled. Moreover, Amresh revealed that Robert had owned up to playing the song to music composer Srikanth Deva, and had attempted to include it in another shelved film titled Minor Kunju Kaanom which Tinku, Robert and Srikanth Deva were involved in.

== Partial filmography ==
=== Films ===
- Anbulla Rajinikanth (1984)
- Vaidehi Kathirunthal (1984)
- Japanil Kalyanaraman (1985)
- Adutha Veedu (1986)
- Uyire Unakkaga (1986) as Ramu alias Ramuvilass
- Aalappirandhavan (1987)
- Chellakkutti (1987)
- Paasa Paravaigal (1988)
- Varusham 16 (1989)
- Agni Paarvai (1992)
- Thevar Magan (1992)
- Naan Pesa Ninaipathellam (1993)
- Jaya (2002)
- Saroja (2008) as himself

=== Television ===
Serials

- Kana Kaanum Kaalangal (2006–2009) in a cameo appearance
- Kolangal (2003 – January 2009) as Arjun Eshwar
- Alai Osai (2002–2005)
- Ahalya
- Roja (2006) as Mukesh
- Lakshmi (2006–2008)
- Thirumathi Selvam (2007–2012) as Vasu (replaced by Dev Anand)
- Vairanenjam (2007–2009) as Madasamy (dubbed as aadajanma on Star Maa and Swarna manasu on Asianet)
- Thiyagam
- Naanayam
- Nimmathi
- Therkappu Kalai Theeratha

Other shows

- Jodi Number One
