= Valladesam =

- Directed by: N. T. Nantha
- Written by: N. T. Nantha
- Produced by: K. Raveendran; Emmanuel
- Starring: Anu Hasan; Nassar; David Yuvarajan
- Cinematography: N. T. Nantha
- Edited by: Deepak S. Dwaraknath
- Music by: L. V. Muthukumarasamy; R. K. Sundar
- Production company: Lakxshanna Pictures
- Release date: 22 September 2017
- Country: India
- Language: Tamil

Valladesam (transl. Highly Developed country) is a 2017 Indian Tamil-language action film written and directed by N. T. Nantha. The film stars Anu Hasan, with Nassar, Amit, David Yuvarajan and Akarshana portraying supporting characters. The film began production in early 2012 and had a theatrical release after several delays on 22 September 2017.

== Cast ==
- Anu Hasan as Anu
- Nassar
- Bala Singh
- V. I. S. Jayapalan
- Amit Tiwari
- David Yuvarajan as David
- Akarshana as Anjali
- Andrei Lenart as Andrei Blok
- Rory Locke as Alex Dela
- Pippa Winslow as Surgeon
- Kumud Pant as CID Officer

== Production ==
Anu Hasan first announced the project during an interview to The Hindu in May 2012, stating she had signed on to appear in a film titled Kanavugal Aayiram to be directed by London-based film maker Nantha Thurai. The film began shoot in London during late 2012 under the title of Aayiram Kanavugal and was also developed under its literal English translation 1000 Dreams, before undergoing a name change in late 2014 after a period of little progress. Following two years of inactivity, the team prepared the film for a theatrical release in September 2017.

== Soundtrack ==
Valla Desam

Soundtrack album by L. V. Muthukumarasamy & R. K. Sundar
- Released: 1 July 2016
- Recorded: 3 August 2015
- Length: 21:06
- Language: Tamil
- Label: Junglee Music
External audio
- Audio Jukebox on YouTube

The film's music was composed by L. V. Muthukumarasamy and R. K. Sundar, while the audio rights of the film were acquired by Junglee Music. The album was released on 3 August 2015 and featured five songs.

No.	Title	Lyrics	Music	Singer(s)	Length
1.	"Theyil Suttalum"	Muthu Vijayan	L. V. Muthukumarasamy	Silambarasan	03:44
2.	"Edho Edho Ennam"	Samaran	L. V. Muthukumarasamy	Suchitra	04:24
3.	"Manamae Manamae"	Mullai Nishanthan	L. V. Muthukumarasamy	Priya Himesh, Abhay Jodhpurkar	04:07
4.	"Vaa Thanimayil"	Samaran	R. K. Sundar	Padmalatha	04:15
5.	"Megam Kalaivathillai"	Samaran	R. K. Sundar	Palakkad Sreeram	04:40
Total length:					21:06

== Release and reception ==
The film was released across Tamil Nadu on 22 September 2017 during the most crowded release date of the year at the Chennai box office. The film drew largely negative reviews, with a critic from Sify.com writing that the film has "bad writing and amateurish making" and "ends up as a tedious watch mainly due to the bland writing". The critic added the film has "the potential for an edge of the seat action thriller but sadly the problem is that it literally offers nothing new and execution is below average". A critic from the Deccan Chronicle wrote "the problems of Valla Desam start early and despite having a lot of the elements required for a successful spy thriller in place, the dialogues and the characterization fall flat, and because of this, none of the personal tragedy and dangers tends to strike you as imminent. Likewise, a reviewer from The Times of India noted "Valla Desam aspires to be a tense spy thriller, but falls short in both the writing and making." Baradwaj Rangan of Film Companion wrote "It’s a great idea to bring the Vijayashanti brand of action-heroine back to the Tamil screen, but you have to make us invest in her as a person first. Anu’s family scenes are painfully perfunctory."
