= Preetha =

Indian actress and film producer

Preetha Raaghav
- Born: Preetha Subramanian
- Other name: Preetha Raaghav
- Occupations: Anchor, actress
- Spouse: Raaghav (m. 2002)

Preetha is an Indian television personality and film producer. She also hosted Cinema Karam Coffee on STAR Vijay and the popular cookery show Sunday Samayal on Sun TV.

== Career ==
While still in college she received an offer for acting in an advertisement. After a one-year career in advertisements Preetha began her television career with the serial Aalayam which aired on Sun TV in 1999. She has acted in several Tamil language serials that were screened on Sun TV. She also has participated in the first series of the dance reality show Jodi Number One along with her husband Raaghav in STAR Vijay. The couple was one of the three finalists.

Preetha produced the fantasy thriller film Nanjupuram which featured her husband Raaghav in the lead role. It was Raaghav's debut film. She also participated in the music show Gold Winner Isai Kudumbam and serials like Chithi (Sun TV) and Marumagal (Vijay TV). She acted in the serial Maanada Mayilaada on Kalaignar TV along with his husband. They both played the characters of terrorists. She is also a Mohiniattam and Bharatnatyam dancer.

Preetha's first film appearance was in Dumm Dumm Dumm (2001). She received her school education in Muscat, bachelor's degree in travel management from Ethiraj College for Women in Chennai. Master's degree in Social Work from DG Vaishnav College. While studying in DG Vaishnav College she married music director and television actor Raaghav. She studied at Ohio University on a scholarship. To earn her living in Ohio Preetha taught Public Speaking and Bharatnatyam. She also works as a soft-skills trainer in Wipro.

== Filmography ==
=== As an actress ===
Year	Film	Role	Notes
2000	Mugavaree	Sridhar's sister	Debut film
2001	Dumm Dumm Dumm	Charu	
2002	Yai! Nee Romba Azhaga Irukke!	Preetha	
2003	Five by Four	Shruti	

=== As a producer ===
- Nanjupuram (2011)
- Ticket (2017)

=== Television ===
Serials

Year	Title	Role	Channel
2000	Aalayam		Sun TV
2001	Chithi		Sun TV
2002	Marumagal		Vijay TV
2003–2004	Sahana	Rasi	Jaya TV
2009	Arasi	Malarvilli	Sun TV
2013–2014	Pasamalar	Uma	Sun TV
2021	Anbe Vaa	Baby	Sun TV

Shows

Year	Title	Role	Channel
2004–2006	Sunday Samayal	Host	Sun TV
2006	Jodi No. 1	Contestant	Vijay TV
2007	Maanada Mayilada	Contestant	Kalaignar TV
2021	Rowdy Baby	Contestant	Sun TV
