= Koffee With DD =

- Genre: Talk show
- Based on: Koffee with Karan
- Directed by: Divyamani
- Presented by: Divyadarshini
- Country of origin: India
- Original language: Tamil
- No. of seasons: 3
- No. of episodes: 70

Production
- Camera setup: Multi-camera
- Running time: 40–45 minutes

Original release
- Network: Star Vijay
- Release: 29 September 2013 – 15 January 2017

Koffee with DD is an Indian Tamil talk show hosted by television personality Dhivyadharshini (DD). It was previously hosted by Anu Haasan, from 2006 to 2013. The show aired on Star Vijay from 29 September 2013 till 15 January 2017. The show is the Tamil adaptation of Koffee with Karan.

== Episode list ==
=== Season 1 ===
Episode	Celebrity	Notes	Original Telecast Date
1	Nayanthara		29-Sep-13
2	Vijay Sethupathi		06-Oct-13
3	Dhanush		20-Oct-13
4	Dhanush and Sivakarthikeyan		27-Oct-13
5	Vishal and Lakshmi Menon		03-Nov-13
6	Yuvan Shankar Raja		10-Nov-13
7	Arya and Anushka Shety	To promote Irandam Ulagam	17-Nov-13
8	Anirudh		24-Nov-13
9	Pooja and Varalaxmi		01-Dec-13
10	GV Prakash		08-Dec-13
11	Vikram Prabhu and Prabhu Solomon		15-Dec-13
12	Venkat Prabhu and Prem G		22-Dec-13
13	Jiiva, Trisha and Ahmed		29-Dec-13
14	Sri Priya and Radhika		05-Jan-14
15	Gautam Karthik		12-Jan-14
16	Atharvaa		19-Jan-14
17	Gauthami and Khushboo		26-Jan-14
18	Andrea Jeremiah		02-Feb-14
19	Prasanna, Vimal and Soori	To promote Pulivaal	09-Feb-14
20	Udhayanithi		16-Feb-14
21	Sasikumar		23-Feb-14
22	Devayani and Nakhul		02-Mar-14
23	Amala Paul		09-Mar-14
24	Shriya Saran		16-Mar-14
25	Raju Murugan, Malavika Nair and Dinesh	To promote Cuckoo	23-Mar-14
26	Vivek		30-Mar-14
27	Anirudh		06-Apr-14
28	Vishal and Thiru	To promote Naan Sigappu Manithan	13-Apr-14
29	Madhu and Dulquer Salmaan	To promote Vaayai Moodi Pesavum	20-Apr-14
30	Vadivelu		27-Apr-14
31	GV Prakash and AL Vijay	To promote Saivam	04-May-14
32	Aadhi, Prem G and Vijay Vasanth		11-May-14
33	Ashok Selvan and Janani Iyer		18-May-14
34	Karunakaran and Rupa Manjari	To promote Yaamirukka Bayamey	25-May-14
35	Rana Daggubati		01-Jun-14
36	Soundarya Rajinikanth	To promote Kochadaiiyaan	08-Jun-14
37	Vikranth and Vishnu Vishal		15-Jun-14
38	Prathap Pothen and Yugi Sethu		22-Jun-14
39	Dhivyadharshini's Sangeet	Guests - Makapa, Priyanka, Bhavana, Ramya, Robo Shakar, Erode Mahesh, Thaadi Balaji, Jagan and Vignesh. DD's fiancé - Srikanth Ravichandran	29-Jun-14
40	Dhivyadharshini's Sangeet	Guests - Makapa, Priyanka, Bhavana, Ramya, Robo Shakar, Erode Mahesh, Thaadi Balaji, Jagan and Vignesh. DD's fiancé - Srikanth Ravichandran	06-Jul-14

=== Season 2 ===
Episode	Celebrity	Notes	Original Telecast Date
1	Jiiva and Thulasi	To promote Yaan (film)	05-Oct-14
2	Meena and Kala		12-Oct-14
3	SJ Suryah and Satyaraj	To promote Isai	19-Oct-14
4	AR Muragadoss		26-Oct-14
5	Arjun Sarja and Aishwarya Arjun		02-Nov-14
6	Siddharth	To promote Kaaviya Thalaivan	08-Nov-14
7	Vishnuvardhan and Krishna		16-Nov-14
8	Sibiraj and Prasanna		23-Nov-14
9	Prithiviraj, Radha Mohan and Vasanthabalan		30-Nov-14
10	Nadhiya and Amala		07-Dec-14
11	Myshkkin, Narain and Pandiarajan		14-Dec-14
12	KS Ravikumar and Cheran	To promote Lingaa	21-Dec-14
13	Vaibhav and VTV Ganesh	To promote Kappal	28-Dec-14
14	Sivakumar, Vasanth, Crazy Mohan and Yugi Sethu	Tribute to K. Balachandar	03-Jan-15
15	GV Prakash, Srushti Dange and Karunas	To promote Darling	11-Jan-15
16	Sarathkumar		18-Jan-15
17	Laila		25-Jan-15
18	Brindha		01-Feb-15
19	K Bhagyaraj and Poornima Bhagyaraj		08-Feb-15
20	Gautam Menon and Arun Vijay	To promote Yennai Arindhaal	15-Feb-15
21	Dhanush and K. V. Anand	To promote Anegan	22-Feb-15
22	Sivakarthikeyan and Sathish	To promote Kaaki Sattai	01-Mar-15
23	Ponvannan and Saranya		08-Mar-15
24	Veera and Regina Cassandra	To promote Rajathandhiram	15-Mar-15
25	Prashanth		22-Mar-15
26	Udhayanithi and Kiruthiga		29-Mar-15
27	Suhasini		05-Apr-15
28	Lakshmi Menon		12-Apr-15
29	Aishwarya Rajinikanth, Gautham Karthik and Priya Anand	To promote Vai Raja Vai	26-Apr-15

=== Season 3 ===
Episode	Celebrity	Notes	Original Telecast Date
1	R. Madhavan	To promote Irudhi Suttru	26-Jan-16

=== Specials ===
Celebrity	Notes	Original Telecast Date
Prabhu Solomon and D. Imman	Christmas Special. To promote Kayal	26-Dec-14
Shankar	Pongal Special. To promote I	15-Jan-15
Mani Ratnam, A. R. Rahman and Dulquer Salmaan	Tamil New Year Special. To promote O Kadhal Kanmani	14-Apr-15
Jyothika	May Day Special. To promote 36 Vayadhinile	01-May-15
Vikram and Samantha	Ayudha Pooja Special. To promote 10 Endrathukulla	21-Oct-15
Kamal Haasan	Deepavali Special. To promote Thoongaa Vanam	15-Nov-15
Ilayaraaja	Pongal Special	15-Jan-16
Arya, Sri Divya, Rana Daggubati and Bobby Simhaa	Valentines Day Special. To promote Bangalore Naatkal	14-Feb-16
Suriya, Nithya Menen and Vikram Kumar	May Day Special. To promote 24	01-May-16
Vikram and Anand Shankar	Independence Day Special. To promote Iru Mugan	15-Aug-16
Dhanush, Keerthy Suresh and Prabhu Solomon	Vinayagar Chaturthi Special. To promote Thodari	05-Sep-16
Silambarasan and Gautham Vasudev Menon	Deepavali Special. To promote Achcham Yenbadhu Madamaiyada	29-Oct-16
Suriya	New Year Special. To promote Si3	01-Jan-17
Vijay Sethupathi and Renjith	Pongal Special. To promote Puriyatha Puthir	15-Jan-17
