= Kannedhirey Thondrinal (TV series) =

Tamil language soap opera

- Genre: Soap opera Family
- Created by: Rambo Visual Works
- Written by: V. Padmavathy
- Screenplay by: V.padmavathy Dialogues Tamizhmaran
- Directed by: R. R. Karthikeyan; Parameshwar
- Creative director: M. B. Gowrish
- Starring: Malavika Avinash; Swetha Khelge; Jayshri Jue; Jeevan G Ranjit Babu
- Country of origin: India
- Original language: Tamil
- No. of episodes: 726

Production
- Producer: M. B. Gowrish
- Camera setup: Multi-camera
- Running time: 20-22 mins per episode
- Production company: Rambo Visual Works

Original release
- Network: Kalaignar TV
- Release: 27 June 2022 – 2 November 2024

Kannedhirey Thondrinaal is a Tamil-language family television series created by M. B. Gowrish under the production company Rambo Visual Works and directed by R.R. Karthikeyan, followed by Parmeshwar. This is Rambo Visual Works' first production work. The story starred Malavika Avinash, Swetha Khelge, Jayshri Jue and Jeevan G.

The series aired on Kalaignar TV from 27 June 2022 to 2 November 2024 and ended with 726 episodes.

== Cast ==
=== Main ===
- Swetha Khelge as Sakthi Shiva
- Malavika Avinash as Rudhra Devi Bhoominathan
- Jayshri Jue / Ramya Balakrishna / Jayshri Jue as Anitha (Dead)
- Jeevan Vaa as Shiva Manivannan

=== Supporting ===
- Kavitha Solairaja as Indumathi Manivannan (Main Antagonist)
- Tejas Gowda / Mohan as Santosh Manivannan
- Vaishu Jayachandhiran / Kavya Amira / Dhanalakshmi / Vaishu Jayachandiran as Divya Arun
- Ranjit Babu as Arun Ratnakumar
- Som Soumyan / Ramachandran Mahalingam as Ratnakumar aka Ratnam (Antagonist)
- Kovai Babu / Arvind Venkat / Krishna Kumar as Manivannan
- Shwetha B as Seetha Ratnakumar (Dead)
- Mohan Vaidya / Sivakumar as Ganesan
- Padmini Chandrashekaran as Lakshmi Ganesan
- Aikkia Balakrishnan as Gayathri Ganesan (Dead)
- Preethi Bubramani as Kalyani Ganesan

=== Cameo appearances ===
- Vadivukkarasi as Abirami
- Ravikumar as Seetha's father
- Raaghav as Surya
- Shanthi Arvind as Raja Rajeshwari
- Rekha Krishnappa as Aadhira
- Papri Ghosh as Dr. Aaradhana
- Sudha Chandran as Sarada Devi
- Prajin as Vikram
- Arun Chandra Kumar as Selva
- Shyam Viswanathan as Kesavan
- Ashwini Radhakrishna as Lawyer Yazhini
- Bharath Kalyan as Adv. Tiger Varadhachari
- Srividya as Rudra's mother (Posthumous photographic appearance)

== Production ==
=== Development ===
Rambo Visual Works, a new production company headed by M.B. Gowrish began the production of its first serial Kannedhirey Thondrinal on Kalaignar TV.

=== Casting ===
Actress Malavika Avinash was cast as Rudhra, a woman from a wealthy family. Newcomer actor 'Jeevan G Vaa' was cast as the male lead Shiva. Actress Jayshri was cast Main Antagonist as Anitha. On 10 March, Vadivukkarasi was cast as Abirami.

Actor Kovai Babu was cast as Manivannan, but was replaced by Arvind Venkat in May 2023. Vaishu Jayachandhiran was selected to portray a supporting role as Dhivya but in October 2023 she quit the show. Actress Kavya Amira was replaced her role. In June 2023, actor Raaghav entered the show as Surya, Sakthi's new love interest.

In September 2023, Actor Ravikumar joined the cast to play a supporting role, will play the role of Sakthi's grandfather. On 25 November 2023, Actress Papri Ghosh joined the cast to play the Doctor for a new story track. In end of November, Kavya Amira was replaced by Dhanalakshmi as Dhivya.

On 24 December 2023, actress Jayshri Jue was replaced by Ramya Balakrishna as Anitha. Jayshri Jue returned as Anitha on 19 May 2024, replacing Ramya Balakrishna. In February 2024, singer and actor Mohan Vaidya joined the cast to play a supporting role.
