= Chandrahasan =

Indian film producer (1937–2017)

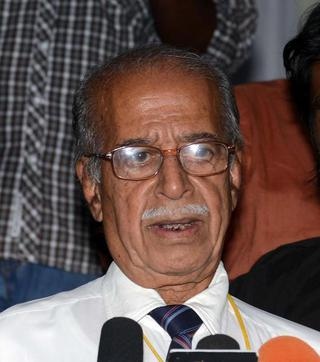
- Chandrahasan in 2013
- Born: 6 March 1936; Paramakudi, Ramnad district, Madras Presidency, British India (now Ramanathapuram district, Tamil Nadu, India)
- Died: 18 March 2017 (aged 81); London, England, United Kingdom
- Occupations: Film producer, actor
- Years active: 1981–2017
- Spouse: Geethamani (m. 1965; died 2017)
- Children: 2, including Anu Hasan
- Family: See Haasan family

Chandrahasan Srinivasan (6 March 1936 – 18 March 2017) was a film producer and actor from Tamil Nadu, India.

== Early life ==
He was born as the second of four children of advocate Srinivasan and Rajalakshmi in Paramakudi, a town in present-day Ramanathapuram district, Tamil Nadu. His elder brother Charuhasan and younger brother Kamal Haasan later worked predominantly as actors in the film industry, while his younger sister, Nalini Raghuram, became a classical dancer.

In contrast to Charuhasan (who practised as a singer, before being readied for a career as a lawyer), Chandrahasan maintained a very close relationship with his younger brother Kamal Haasan throughout his successful career as an actor.

== Career ==
In 1995, he appeared as an actor in his niece Suhasini Maniratnam's directorial debut Indira. The film featured his own daughter Anu Hasan in the title role alongside Arvind Swamy and Nassar. During the 2000s, Chandrahasan took a more active role in the management of Raaj Kamal Films International. During the problems faced during the release of Vishwaroopam (2013), Charuhasan had taken a pivotal role in mediating with the opposition.

Prior to his death, Chandrahasan completed acting in the lead role of a film titled Appathava Aattaya Pottutanga by debutant director Stephen Rangaraj. A tale of romance between two older individuals, Stephen cast Chandrahasan as he wanted someone who was known as a "respectable person" and because the romance should not be conveyed in the wrong light. The film, which featured him alongside Sheela, the mother of actor Vikranth, was completed in 2017 but had a direct release in OTT platform Sony Liv in 2021.

== Personal life ==
Chandrahasan was married to Geethamani and has a son, Nirmal Hasan, who is settled in the United States. His daughter, Anu Hasan, has appeared as an actress in Indian and British productions.

Geethamani died in January 2017, aged 73.

== Death ==
Following a cardiac arrest, Chandrahasan died aged 81 on 18 March 2017 in London, United Kingdom. Following the death of his wife in January 2017, Chandrahasan had travelled to stay with his son Nirmal in the United States, for a change of scenery. On his return, to avoid taking a twenty three hour journey to Chennai, he had made a brief stopover in London to visit his daughter Anu. He was staying at her residence during the time of his death. The family later held a quiet funeral upon the return of his body to Chennai, before holding a remembrance meet with film industry personalities in April 2017. Apart from family, other guests included Rajinikanth, Ilaiyaraaja and Prakash Raj. Kamal Haasan later described his brother as "a father figure".

== Filmography ==
As a producer

As an actor

| Year | Film | Role(s) | Language(s) | Notes | Ref. |
|---|---|---|---|---|---|
| 1981 | Raja Paarvai | Raghu's / Chandram's father | Tamil / Telugu | | |
| 1991 | Penn | | Tamil | Mini-series | |
| 1995 | Indira | Minister | Tamil | | |
| 2000 | Hey Ram | Mohan Gandhiraman | Tamil / Hindi | | |
| 2021 | Appathava Aattaya Pottutanga | Ramasamy | Tamil | Posthumous release | |
