= Yai! Nee Romba Azhaga Irukey! =

2002 film by Vasanth

- Poster
- Directed by: Vasanth
- Screenplay by: Vasanth
- Story by: Ashok Iyer
- Produced by: G. Venkateswaran
- Starring: Shaam; Sneha; Rajiv Krishna; Jaya Re
- Cinematography: S. Gopinath
- Edited by: V. T. Vijayan
- Music by: Original Songs:- Raaghav-Raja; Srinivas; Ramesh Vinayakam; Murugavel; Aravind–Shankar; Background score:- Sabesh–Murali
- Production company: GV Films
- Release date: 13 July 2002
- Country: India
- Language: Tamil

Yai! Nee Romba Azhaga Irukey! (transl. Hey! You are so beautiful!) is a 2002 Indian Tamil-language romantic musical film written and directed by Vasanth. Starring Shaam, Sneha, Rajiv Krishna and Jaya Re, the film narrates the story of four youngsters who go through unrequited love and respond differently to their failures. Produced by G. Venkateswaran through GV Films, it had a theatrical release on 13 July 2002 and was a box office failure.

== Plot ==
Hari, Raji, and Arthi are cousins. Hari gets a job in Chennai. He then comes to Chennai and instead of staying at Raji and Arthi's home he rents an apartment with his colleague Subbu. Raji doesn't like this and refuses to come to Hari's house until he visits her place. But they meet and catch up with each other now and then. Meanwhile, Hari meets another girl, Swapna, who plays pranks on people just for fun. During one such prank Hari and Swapna end up becoming friends. They both work in rival Ad agency. While doing a project Hari selects his cousin Raji's photo (of her eyes) over Swapna's which makes her upset. But to reconcile their friendship Hari sends Swapna's pics to Miss Chennai competition which she eventually wins. After a few days Hari, Raji and Swapna coincidentally meet in shopping place where Hari ends up fighting with a person who misbehaved with Raji. Raji gets angry and walks away. Hari drops off Swapna to her house where she proposes to Hari, to which Hari refuses. But he thanks her for making him realise that he is actually in love with his cousin, Raji. Hari apologises to Swapna. Raji goes to attend her childhood friend's marriage and when she comes back brings along her friend's brother and also her friend, Bharat. Bharat had proposed to a girl and when she rejected him, he took to drinking. To make him forget his grief Raji brings him to Chennai. Hari first mistakes that Raji is in love with Bharat. On his birthday, he asks her if she loves Bharat and when she clears off his misunderstanding, he immediately proposes to her. She rejects him.

Over the days, Raji and Hari behave in a very normal and usual manner which confuses Hari's friends. They confront him to which he replies that just because she doesn't love me, doesn't mean that I should snub her or treat her badly or take to drinking or some such means, that means that my love was never true. Love is not business or deal in which it is to be given only when you get it in return. Hari's friend, Swapna, who had earlier proposed to him joins his office and rebukes him, saying she doesn't talk to people who don't like her. One day she falsely complains to their boss about Hari misbehaving with her, for which Hari gets a warning from his boss. Hari never behaves badly with Raji or snubs her, in fact he goes out of his way to help. During one such incident when Raji gets injured during a festival, Hari carries her all the way to hospital and takes care of her. One evening Raji calls Hari saying that she and Bharat had gone to the beach and he drank so much that now he is sick and puking all over. She asks Hari to come and help her. Hari comes to the beach, in spite of the fact that he has a very important meeting to attend. Meanwhile, Raji calls again at Hari's office since it was getting late, which is answered by Swapna and Raji blurts out that Hari is coming to help her and will not be able to attend the meeting. Swapna assures Raji that Hari need not go for the meeting, she will attend it herself. On hearing this, Hari gets suspicious, which makes Raji think over and apologises to him for talking to Swapna and revealing that Hari is not going for the meeting. He tells her to not worry, and also takes Bharat to his flat and advises him to handle the love failure in a practical way. The next morning, Hari is sacked, since he did not attend the meeting which cost the company a very important project. Hari vigorously goes to Swapna's house and explains her that she should not waste her life on harassing him and should instead should find peace within.

Bharat, Hari and Raji set off to attend Bharat's lover's marriage. Despite Hari's consoling advice, Bharat commits suicide in the train. Hari does not attend his funeral. When Raji questions him, Hari replies by saying that Bharat took a wrong step and he doesn't like such people. Raji realises that Hari is a very good guy. In spite of she rejecting him, he has always helped her and is still in love with her. She falls for him. Hari is stabbed by some goons with whom he fought earlier. He is hospitalised.

But at the same time Raji's parents are preparing for her match making. Raji confesses to her father that she wants to marry Hari. At that moment, she gets a call from a hospital informing her about Hari's accident. Raji rushes to the hospital where the doctor informs her that Hari will be treated for his stab wounds, but he cannot be treated for his cancer, which is in the last stage. Raji cries over his sick bed, finally accepting his proposal. To this Hari smiles mischievously and the doctor reveals that he does not have cancer, they just played a prank to tease her. Hari and Raji hug each other.

== Cast ==
- Shaam as Hari
- Sneha as Raji
- Aahaa Rajiv Krishna as Bharat
- Chocklet Jaya Re as Swapna
- Vivek as Subbu
- Arsheetha as Arthi
- Madhan Bob as Mani
- Mohan Raman as Raji and Arthi's father
- Mohan Sharma as the managing director
- Kavithalaya Krishnan as Subbu's brother
- Uma as Uma
- Bombay Gnanam as Hari's mother
- Preetha as Preetha
- Vishwa Viswanathan as Ravi
- John Ranjith as Hari's friend
- Srinath as Ravi
- Ramya Krishnan as a doctor (special appearance)
- Jennifer as Yamini (special appearance in the song "Yamini Yamini")

== Production ==
Jyothika was to pair up with Shaam for the film but she was replaced by Sneha at Shaam's request, who later teamed up with Shaam in ABCD (2005) and Inba (2008). The makers chose to shoot the song "Thottu Thottu" in Syria, with the ancient ruins of Palmyra used as the backdrop.

== Soundtrack ==
Vasanth opted to use five new composers to compose a song each in the film. Leading playback singer Srinivas, who had previously composed private albums, made his first film song with "Inni Naanum Naanillai", singing it alongside Sujatha. He also introduced singer Sunitha Sarathy into playback singing, giving her a chance to a part of his composition. Ramesh Vinayakam made his debut with this film, he composed and sang "Thottu Thottu". Raaghav composed "Oru Kaadhal Vandhucho" along with Raja. Murugan (brother of singer Anuradha Sriram) who is a drummer and also sang "Nee Illai Endral" in Dheena composed "Poi Sollalam". Raaghav and Murugan played supporting roles in the film. "Oru Kaadhal Vandhucho" topped the charts, although the film's failure meant that Raaghav shifted his focus to acting.

Song	Composer(s)	Singers	Lyricist
"Yamini Yamini"	Aravind–Shankar	Harish Raghavendra	Pa. Vijay
"Thottu Thottu"	Ramesh Vinayakam	Ramesh Vinayakam, Srivardhini	Palani Bharathi
"Oru Kadhal Vandicho"	Raaghav-Raja	Shankar Mahadevan	Thamarai
"Inni Naanum Naanilai"	Srinivas	Srinivas, Sujatha, Sunitha Sarathy	Thamarai
"Poi Sollalam"	Murugan	P. Unnikrishnan, Anuradha Sriram	Pa. Vijay

== Reception ==
The Hindu wrote that "This is Shaam's second film after ``12B and he proves that he is complete hero material — good at dance and in expressions". Sify wrote that "On the whole Vassant has dished out an undernourished love story which lacks both style and soul". Malini Mannath of Chennai Online wrote that "And for the first half, the director keeps his narration closer to the issue. But then as the film progresses, it is like the director was distracted, loses focus of the theme, and the main issue gets sidelined in the process". Kalki, instead of publishing their own review, compiled and published the comments of viewers. Cinesouth wrote, "Tamil cinema has seen such stories countless number of times. 'Poove Unakkaaga' and 'Rojakootam' indirectly belong to this category. In those films, the incidents narrate the story. In this film, Vasanth's approach stops with the dialogues alone. A story like this hasn't been dragged properly with a good screenplay. As a result, the movie, especially the first half of it, fumbles along and gives us the feeling that the story is drifting along aimlessly".

The film received criticism for the climax, but is still considered an underrated film.
