= Jodi No.1 (TV series) =

Indian reality dance television show

- Promotional logo
- Genre: Reality; Dance show
- Presented by: Divyadarshini (1-4 & 7-8); Priyadharshini (5); Deepak (2-6); Aravind Akash (1); Sivakarthikeyan (5); Bhavana (5 & 10); Priyanka Deshpande (9); Rio Raj (10)
- Judges: Ramya Krishnan (1 & 5); Prashanth (1); Kala (1); Sangeetha (2-5); Silambarasan (2); Sundaram (2-3)
- Country of origin: India
- Original language: Tamil
- No. of seasons: 10

Production
- Running time: approx. 45-55 minutes per episode

Original release
- Network: Star Vijay
- Release: October 2006 – January 2019

Jodi Number One is an Indian Tamil-language dance competition reality television show broadcast on Star Vijay starting in 2006. The contestants are couples who are generally television stars in their own right, often from the television industry. Over twelve years, Jodi Number One has rolled out ten seasons.

== Series ==
Season	Anchors	Judges	Winners	Runners up
1	Divyadarshini & Aravind Akash	Prashanth, Ramya Krishnan, Kala	Prem & Pooja Madhu	Raaghav & Preetha Raaghav
2	Divyadarshini & Deepak Dinkar	Silambarasan, Sangeetha, Mugur Sundar	Tinku & Preethi Sanjeev	Venkat & Nisha
3	Divyadarshini & Deepak Dinkar	S. J. Suryah, Sangeetha, Mugur Sundar	Kiran & Priya	Sivakarthikeyan & Aishwarya
4	Divyadarshini & Deepak Dinkar	Jeeva, Aishwarya Dhanush, Sangeetha	Michael Thangadurai & Hemalata	
5	Deepak Dinkar & Priyadharshini	Radhika, Gautami, Shobana, Sangeetha	Prem Gopal & Premini	Sathish Krishnan & Divyadarshini
6	Deepak Dinkar, Sivakarthikeyan, Bhavana Balakrishnan	Ramya Krishnan	Manoj Kumar & Jayanth	Prem Gopal & Vivek
7	Divyadarshini	Ramya Krishnan, Kalyan (choreographer), Radha	Rafiq Raxx & Gabriella Charlton	Mani & Devipriya
8	Divyadarshini	Kalyan (choreographer), Radha	Amudhavanan & Anandhi	Lokesh & Sunita Gogoi
9	Priyanka Deshpande & Erode Mahesh	Kalyan (choreographer), Radha	Rahman & Sofia	Raymond Callanan & Moulika
10	Priyanka Deshpande & KPY Kuraishi	T. Rajendar, Sadha, Devayani	Manichandra & Felina	Adi & Sonali
11: Fun Unlimited	Rio Raj & Bhavana	Audience	Lokesh & Megna	Kumaran & VJ Chitra
12: Are U Ready	Rio Raj & Angelina	Meena, Sandy, Sridevi Vijaykumar	Dhanush & Justina	Vignesh & Raveena Daha

== Season 1 ==
The first season aired on every Friday to Saturday at 20:00 from October 2006. The show witnessed four real life couples and 4 fictional (real) life couples engage in a 13-weeks dancing competition. The panel of judges composed of dance master Kala, actor Prashanth and Ramya Krishnan chose the two finalists. The viewers themselves chose the third finalist. Divyadarshini and Aravind Akash serving as the hosts.

Prem Kumar and Pooja - The winners of the Wild Card round were judged the champions of Jodi No. 1 by the audiences. They received 10 lakhs as the prize money.

=== Hosts ===
- Divyadarshini - TV actress
- Aravind Akash - Film actor

=== Judges ===
- Prashanth - Film actor
- Ramya Krishnan - Film actress
- Kala - Choreographer

=== Couples ===
Order	Artists	Results
1	Prem and Pooja Madhu	Winners
2	Raaghav and Preetha Raaghav	1st Runner-up
3	Vijay Adhiraj and Rachana Adhiraj	2nd Runner-up
4	Deepak and Tharika	
5	Chetan and Devadarshini	
6	Rishi and Pooja	
7	Raj Kamal and Latha Rao	
8	Bharath Kalyan and Shilpa	

- The highlighted green rows are the Real Couples.
- The highlighted pink rows are the Reel Couples.

=== Guests ===
- Dhanush - Film actor
- Priyamani - Film actress
- Lakshmi Rai - Film actress
- Rahasya - Film actress
- Yogi B - Rapper
- Dr Burn - Rapper

== Season 2 ==
Jodi no.1 season 2 witnessed many small screen couples, with 8 new celebrity couples. The 8 couples were Kalaiselvan Tinku, Preethi Sanjeev, Yugendren, Hayma Malini, Sree, Krithika, Prithviraj, Uma Riyaz, Arvind, Lakshmi, Irfan, Monisha, Venkat, Nisha, Dev and Aishwarya. Silambarasan, Sangeetha and Raju Sundaram were the judges. Divyadharshini and Deepak Dinkar hosted the season. Tinku and Preethi were the winners of Jodi no. 1 season 2, receiving the 10 lakh prize, whereas Venkat and Nisha won the Best Performance award taking home the Chevy Spark.

=== Hosts ===
- Divyadharshini - TV actress
- Deepak Dinkar - TV actor

=== Judges ===
- Silambarasan - Film actor
- Sangeetha - Film actress
- Raju Sundaram - Choreographer

=== Couples ===
Order	Artists	Results
1	Tinku and Preethi Sanjeev	1st Place
2	Venkat and Nisha	2nd Place
3	Irfan and Monisha Ravishankar	3rd place
4	Dev and Aishwarya	
5	Prithviraj and Uma Riyaz	
6	Shreekumar and Krithika	
7	Aravind and Lakshmi	
8	Yugendran and Malini	

- The highlighted pink rows are the Reel Couples.
- The highlighted green rows are the Real Couples.

=== Guests ===
- Prabhu Deva - Film actor
- Ramya Krishnan - Film actress and Season 1 Judge
- Sneha - Film actress
- Suchitra - Playback singer
- Ragasya - Film actress
- Abbas - Film actor
- Priyamani - Film actress
- Shaam - Film actor
- Madhumitha - Film actress
- Jeeva - Film actor

== Season 3 ==
S. J. Suryah, Sangeetha and Raju Sundaram were the judges. Divyadharshini and Deepak Dinkar has once again been appointed as the host for the second time. Kiran and Priya as the winners.

=== Hosts ===
- Divyadarshini - TV actress
- Deepak - TV actor

=== Judges ===
- S. J. Suryah - Film actor
- Sangeetha - Film actress
- Raju Sundaram - Choreographer

=== Couples ===
Order	Artists	Results
1	Kiran and Priya	Winners [Kiran Best male dancer]
2	Lollu Sabha Jeeva / Sivakarthikeyan and Iswarya	Runner-Up
3	Rishi and Charmila	
4	Uday and Gayathri	
5	Iyyappan and Suhasini(best female dancer	
6	Badava and Haritha Gopi	
7	Dinesh and Haritha	
8	Pandi and Poornima	
9	Prajin and Chandra Lakshman	
10	Madhu and Hemalatha	

- The highlighted pink rows are the Reel Couples.
- The highlighted green rows are the Real Couples.

=== Guests ===
- Simran - Actress
- Jeeva - Actor
- Nila - Actress
- Lakshmi Rai - Actress

== Season 4 ==
Jeeva, Sangeetha and Aishwarya Rajinikanth were the judges. Divyadharshini and Deepak Dinkar has once again been appointed as the host for the third time. Michael Thangadurai and Hemalata as the winners.

=== Hosts ===
- Divyadarshini - TV actress
- Deepak - TV actor

=== Judges ===
- Jiiva - Film actor
- Aishwarya Rajinikanth - Film director
- Sangeetha - Film actress

=== Couples ===
Order	Artists	Results
1	Mahendran(Walked out)/Michael Thangadurai and Hemalata	Winners
2	Rajesh and Suhasini	
3	Sarath Chandran and Preethi	
4	Sanjay Jayaraman and Pooja	Best Individual Performer (Sanjay)
5	Nethran and Aruna Devi	
6	Venkat and Nisha	
7	Tinku and Santhoshi	
8	Ravindran and Pooja	

=== Guests ===
- Kamna Jethmalani - Film Actress
- Surya Sivakumar - Film Actor
- Sameera Reddy - Film Actress
- Divya Spandana - Film Actress
- Shanthnoo Bhagyaraj - Film Actor
- Srikanth - Film Actor
- Jai - Film Actor
- A. R. Murugadoss - Film Director

== Season 5 ==
The fifth season aired from October 2011. Prem Gopal and Premini as the winners.

=== Hosts ===
- Deepak - TV anchor
- Priyadharshini - actress

=== Judges ===
- Radhika - Film actress
- Gautami - Film actress
- Shobana - Film actress and a Choreographer
- Sangeetha - Film actress

=== Couples ===
Order	Artists	Results
1	Prem Gopal and Premini	Winners (1st Place)
2	Sathish Krishnan and Divyadarshini	1st Runners Up (2nd Place)
3	Manikandan and Rajni	2nd runner-up (3rd place)
4	Wong and Sunita Gogoi	Top 4 Finalist (4th Place)
5	Sri Kar and Priya	
6	Suresh and Jaya Lakshmi	
7	Sheriff and Sai Pramoditha	

Guests

- Sangeetha - Film actress
- Shaam - Film actor
- Raghava Lawrence - Film actor
- Sandhya - Film actress
- Karthik Sivakumar - Film actor
- Tamannaah Bhatia - Film actress
- Arya - Film actor
- Pooja - Film actress

== Season 6 ==
=== Directed By ===
- Daniel Aloysius Xavier

=== Produced by ===
- DStudio

=== Hosts ===
- Sivakarthikeyan - TV Host and Actor
- Bhavana Balakrishnan - TV Host
- Deepak Dinkar - TV Host

=== Judges ===
- Ramya Krishnan - Film actress (Main Judge)
- Shanthnoo Bhagyaraj -Film Actor (Intro & Mix Your Strength Round Judge)
- Prasanna (actor) -Film Actor (Group Formation Round Judge)
- Sneha - Film actress (Dasavathram, Navarasam, Classics & Animals Round Judge)
- Meena - Film actress (Rajini Special Round Judge)
- Shaam - Film Actor(Fusion round)
- Sangeetha - Film actress (Tamil Nadu Round, Devotional Round and Romance Round)
- Bhanu Priya - Film actress (Remix Round)
- Khushbu - Film actress (Social Issues and Filmy Round)
- Kalyan (choreographer) (Semifinal, first wild card round and second wild card round)
- Bharath - Actor (first final and grand final)

=== Rounds ===
- 1st Round - Mix Your Strength
- 2nd Round - Group Formation
- 3rd Round - Dasavathram Round
- 4th Round - Rajini Special
- 5th Round - Fusion
- 6th Round - Navarasam
- 7th Round - Tamil Nadu
- 8th Round - Devotional
- 9th Round - Romance
- 10th Round - Classics
- 11th Round - Animals
- 12th Round - Remix
- 13th Round - Social Issues
- 14th Round - Filmy Round

=== Couples ===
Order	Artists	Remarks	No Of Best Performances
1	Jeya Lakshmi and Moulika	Best Jodi (Group Formation & Navarasam Round) / Jaya Lakshmi Best Performer in (Classic Round, Filmy Round and Semifinal)	Jodi - 2 / Individual - 3
2	Swetha and Leelavathi	Best Jodi (Rajini Round) / Leelavathi Best Performer in Devotional Round	Jodi - 1 / Individual - 1 (Eliminated)
3	Jacqueline and Shivashankari	Best Jodi in Social Issues Round / Jacqueline Best Performer in (Animals Round and Social Issues Round) / Shivashankari Best Performer in Remix Round	Jodi - 1 / Individual - 3 (Eliminated in semifinal)
4	Abhinaya and Nethran	Abhinaya Best Performer in (Dasavatharam Round / Wild card round 1).	Individual - 2 (Eliminated)
5	Issac and Logan		Quit from competition
6	Prem Gopal and Vivek	Best Jodi (Romance Round, Animals Round, Filmy Round and Semifinal) / Vivek Best Performer in (Fusion Round and Semifinal) / Prem Gopal Best Performer in Remix round	Jodi - 4/ Individual - 3/ 2nd Place
7	"Rinson" and "Rafiq"	Best Jodi (Fusion Round & Devotional Round) / Best Performer Henna (Guest Performer) in Tamil Nadu round / Rafiq (Romance Round and Filmy Round) / Rinson (Classic Round and finals 1)	Jodi - 2 / Individual - 4 (Eliminated)(Qualified to final)/3rd Place
8	Prabhu and Tyson	Prabhu Best Performer in Navarasam Round	Individual - 1(Eliminated)
9	Ajeesh Rahman and Aneesh Rahman	Best Jodi (Dasavatharam, Tamil Nadu Round, Classic Round & Remix Round) / Aneesh Best Performer in (Rajini Special Round, Social Issues & Romance Round) / Ajeesh Best Performer in Animals Round)	Jodi - 4 / Individual - 4/ 3rd Place
10	Manoj Kumar and Nirmal / Jayanth	Manoj Best Performer in (Wild card round 1)/ Jayanth Best Performer in (Wild card round 2)	Individual -2 (Eliminated)(Qualified to final) winner in Jodi season 5 title

=== Eliminated Jodi's ===
Order	Artists	Reasons
1st	Abhinaya and Nethran	Not in sync. Needed a lot of improvement.
2nd	Manoj Kumar and Nirmal	Nirmal not giving his best. But Manoj was given a 2nd chance to dance with another pair in wild card round.
3rd	Swetha and Leelavathi	Swetha injury. Leela was given 2 choices either to dance with another pair or dance with Swetha if she recovers by wild card round.
4th	Prabhu and Tyson	Not in sync. Performance wasn't consistent.
5th	Issac and Logan	Quit from competition as the Singapore boys have to go back to Singapore for their National Service: ARMY.
6th	Jayalakshmi and Moulika	Eliminated in first final

== Season 7 ==
The seventh season aired from October 2014. This Jodi season 6 was different from the previous seasons. Each couples paired with choreographer and an actor. SOL Productions produced the seven as well.

=== Directed By ===
- Daniel Aloysius Xavier

=== Creative Team ===
- Sithara
- Rahul Vijay
- Manivannan
- Rajesh Narayanan

=== Hosts ===
- Divyadarshini - TV actress

=== Judges ===
- Ramya Krishnan - Film actress
- B. Saroja Devi - Veteran actress - episode 2 (Classical round)
- Radha - Film actress
- Ambika - Film actress
- Poornima Jayaram - Film actress - episode 4 (90s round)
- Bharath - Film actor - episode 5 (2000 round)
- Kalyan (choreographer)

=== Winners ===
- First Place: Rafiq Raxx and Gabriella
- Second Place: Mani and Devipriya
- Third Place: Robo Shankar and Sandhya
- Fourth Place: Sathya and Shilpa

=== Couples ===
Order	Artists	Results
1	Pooja (TV actress) and Anwar (Choreographer)	Eliminated in Short Film Round
2	Nagendra Prasad (Choreographer) and Anandhi (TV actress)	Eliminated in Semi Finals
3	Rafiq Raxx (Choreographer) and Gabriella (TV actress)	Pre-Finalist, Finalist and Winners
4	Raja (Choreographer) and shivani (TV actress)	Left the competition for medical reasons
5	Sathya (Choreographer) and Shilpa (TV actress)	Eliminated in Devotional Round but re-entered in Wild Card Round to Pre-Finals
6	Manoj / Chandru (Choreographer) and Swetha (TV actress)	First to be eliminated but reentered in Wild Card Round to Pre-Finals. Eliminated in Pre-Finals.
7	Dev (TV actor) and Monika (Choreographer)	Eliminated
8	Robo Shankar (Mimicry Artist) and Sandhya (Choreographer)	Pre-finalist and Finalist
9	Abinay (Model) and Jacqueline (Choreographer)	Eliminated
10	Mani (Choreographer) and Devipriya (TV actress)	Pre-finalist and Finalist

== Season 8 ==
This Jodi season 8 was different from the previous seasons. All couples are actors with a few exceptions. Also for the first time, elimination is as individuals rather as a pair. One male and female contestants each with the lowest cumulative scores are eliminated each week. The first contestants to be eliminated this way are Vetri and Shalini.

=== Creative Team ===
- Sithara
- Rahul Vijay
- Manivannan
- Sugenthiren

=== Hosts ===
- Divyadarshini - TV actor

=== Judges ===
- Radha - Film actress
- Radhika - Film actress - episode 4 (Folk Round)
- Kalyan (Choreographer)
- Sreedhar - Choreographer (Old Songs Round)
- Gayathri Raguram - Choreographer (Old Songs Round)

=== Winners ===
- First Place: Amudhavanan and Anandhi
- Second Place: Lokesh and Sunita Gogoi
- Third Place: Siddarth and Priya
- Fourth Place: Yuvraj and Jennifer

=== Couples ===
Order	Artists	Remarks
1	Vetri (TV actor) and Shalini (TV actress)	This jodi was eliminated together in Old Songs Round.
2	Sai Prasanth and Shivani (TV Actress)	Sai Prasanth was eliminated in Cinema Round. Shivani was then paired up with Vadivel Balaji.
3	Vadivel Balaji (Comedian) and Nandhini (TV Actress)	Nandhini was eliminated in Cinema Round. Vadivel Balaji was then paired up with Shivani.
4	Sai Sakthi (TV Actor) and Julie (TV Actress)	This jodi was eliminated together in Situation Round.
5	Yuvraj (Actor/Dancer) and Suchi Bala (Actress)	Suchi Bala was eliminated in Party Round. Yuvraj was then paired up with Jennifer.
6	Karthik (TV Actor) and Jennifer (TV Actress)	Karthik was eliminated in Party Round. Jennifer was then paired up with Yuvraj.
7	Amudhavanan (Comedian) and Kuyili/Asha (TV Actress)	Asha was eliminated in celebration round. Amudhavanan was then paired with Shivani.
8	Vadivel Balaji (Comedian) and Shivani (TV Actress)	Vadivel Balaji was eliminated in celebration round. Shivani was then paired up with Amudhavanan.
9	Vijay (TV Actor) and Anandhi (TV Actress)	Vijay and Anandhi were eliminated due to their low marks in semifinal rounds.
10	Lokesh (Actor/Dancer) and Sunita Gogoi (Dancer/Actress)	Top 1 Runner
11	Siddarth (TV Actor) and Priya (TV actress)	Top 2 Runner
12	Amudhavanan (Comedian) and Anandhi (TV Actress)	Both paired up together in Wildcard round

== Season 9 ==
The eighth season aired from 25 October 2014 to 12 September 2015 and ended with 46 Episodes. Radha and Kalyan were the judges. Priyanka Deshpande and Erode Mahesh hosted the season. Rahman and Sofia as the winners.

=== Hosts ===
- Priyanka Deshpande
- Erode Mahesh

=== Judges ===
- Radha(actress)
- Kalyan

=== Couples ===
Order	Artists	Results
1	Rahman and Sofia	Winner
2	Raymond Callanan and Moulika	
3	Karthik and Yamini / Preethi	
4	Prabhu / Manikandan and Soundarya	
5	Robo shankar and Asha	
6	Mano and molica	
7	Kajal and Sai Raymond	
8	Syam and Nakshathira	

== Season 10 ==
It started on 12 November 2016 and ended on 16 April 2017 with 44 Episodes. T. Rajendar, Sadha and Devayani were the Main judges. Priyanka Deshpande and KPY Kuraishi hosted the season. The show Directed by Daniel Aloysius Xavier. DStudio produced the ninth season as well. Manichandra and Felina as the winners.

=== Creative Team ===
- Sithara
- Rahul Vijay
- Manivannan
- Prabhu
- Sugenthiren
- Vimal
- Dipshi Blessy
- Grace Veronica

=== Host ===
- Priyanka Deshpande - TV Anchor
- KPY Kuraishi

=== Judges ===
- T. Rajendar
- Sadha
- Devayani
- Radha (Special Judge)
- Namitha (Special judge)

=== Rounds ===
- Old Memories Round
- Tentkotta Round
- Celebration Round
- Thannila Gandam Round (only for Real Jodis)
- Ponggal Special
- Fusion Round
- Kid's Special Round
- Masala Mix (Reel) / Folk (Real)
- Solli Adi Round
- Horror Round
- 80s Club Mix Round
- Mass Hero Round
- Group Formation Round
- Semifinal Round

=== Winners ===
- First Place: Manichandra and Felina
- Second Place: Adi and Sonali
- Third Place: Sunita and Priya
- Fourth Place: Alena and Shajid

=== Couples ===
Real Jodi
Reel Jodi

Order	Team	Results
1	Prabu and Malini	This Jodi was eliminated in the Thannila Gandam Round.
2	Aravesh and Soundarya	This Jodi was eliminated in the Fusion Round
3	Thadi Balaji and Nithya	This Jodi was eliminated in the Kid's Special Round
4	Naveen and Nisha	Eliminated
5	Venkat Renganathan and Ajantha	This Jodi was eliminated in the Folk Round.
5	Anand and Bharatha	This Jodi was eliminated in the Masala Mix Round.
7	Mani Master and Lalitha Master	This Jodi gave up their place to avoid the elimination of Rio Raj and Shruthi.
8	Mahesh and Rhema	This Jodi was eliminated in the Mass Hero Round.
9	Heath and Ritwa	This Jodi was eliminated in the Group Formation Round.
10	Yuvaraj and Gayathri	This Jodi withdrew due to Gayathri's medical reasons.
11	Amit and Sriranjini	This Jodi was eliminated in the semifinal round
12	Anjana and Abhinaya	This Jodi was eliminated in the semifinal round
13	Rio Raj and Shruthi	Fifth place
14	Alena and Shajid	Fourth place
15	Sunita and Priya	Second Runners up
16	Adi and Sonali	First Runners up
17	Manichandra and Felina	Title Winners

== Season 11 ==
The tenth season aired from 4 November 2018 to 13 January and ended with 20 Episodes. Bhavana and Rio Raj hosted the season. The show Directed by Daniel Aloysius Xavier. DStudio produced the tenth season as well. Lokesh and Megna as the winners.

=== Host ===
- Rio Raj (former contestant)
- Bhavana

=== Judges ===
- Audiences (For the first time audiences will cast their votes and judge every performance.)

=== Team Captains ===
- Yashika Aannand
- Mahat Raghavendra
- Divyadharshini
- Ma Ka Pa Anand

=== Creative team ===
- Rahul Vijay
- Sugenthiran
- Lakshman Kumar
- Sridharan
- Martin
- Jerome
- Durgadhasan
- Sandra
- Mukund
- Arun

=== Rounds ===
- Introduction Round (non-competitive)
- Jodi-Patti Thiruvizha Round (non-competitive)
- Blockbusters Round
- Old Songs Round
- Romance Round
- Festival/Celebration Round
- Re-creation Round
- Horror Round
- Ticket to Finale (rankings based on average score by audiences and team captains)
- Grand Semi Finale (rankings based on average score by audiences and team captains)

=== Couples ===
All Ranking and Marking will be added here

Red = Danger Zone

Couples	Scores for each week																					
Couples	1		2		3		4		3+4^{1}		5		6		5+6^{2}		7^{3}		8^{4}		Finalist	Grand Finale
Lokesh & Megna	8th	82	3rd	95	3rd	97	1st	96	1st	193	5th	93	1st	99	1st	192	7th	90	1st	100	Finalist 3	Winner
Kumaran & Chitra	4th	88	5th	93	5th	96	5th	88	5th	184	9th	90	1st	99	3rd	189	2nd	97	Ticket to Finale		Finalist 2	1st Runner-Up
Ramar & Rhema	2nd	96	4th	94	1st	99	7th	86	4th	185	7th	91	4th	96	4th	187	1st	100	Ticket to Finale		Finalist 1	2nd Runner-Up
Vishal & Sreethu	11th	78	8th	86	8th	95	4th	90	4th	185	7th	91	4th	96	4th	187	3rd	93	1st	100	Finalist 4	2nd Runner-Up
Atheesh & Utara	3rd	90	2nd	93	2nd	98	3rd	93	3rd	191	2nd	96	6th	89	6th	185	4th	92	3rd	96	Finalist 5	3rd Runner-Up
Britto & Anila	1st	98	1st	98	3rd	97	2nd	95	2nd	192	3rd	95	3rd	97	1st	192	5th	91	4th	94	Finalist 6	4th Runner-Up
Azeem & Shivani	9th	80	10th	83	5th	96	7th	86	6th	182	5th	93	7th	86	8th	179	Eliminated		Wild Card	94	Finalist 7	5th Runner-Up
Rakshan & Jacqueline	7th	84	9th	85	9th	92	5th	88	7th	180	3rd	95	8th	84	8th	179	5th	91	5th	92	Eliminated	Evicted
Madhan & Archana	5th	87	7th	89	5th	96	9th	82	8th	178	1st	97	9th	83	7th	180	7th	90	5th	92	Eliminated	Evicted
Shankarapandian & Krithika	6th	85	6th	92	10th	90	9th	82	9th	172	Eliminated								Wild card	90	Eliminated	Evicted
Amruth Kalam & Mounika	10th	80	11th	74	Eliminated																	Evicted
Kuraishi & Nandhini	Last place	72	Eliminated																			Evicted

^1: Since Week 3 had no elimination, the marks will be added with Week 4 and the team with the lowest marks will be eliminated.

^2: Since Week 5 had no elimination, the marks will be added with Week 6 and the team with the lowest marks will be eliminated.

^3: There will be no elimination on Week 7. But there will be two tickets directly to finale (1st and 2nd) based on marks given by Judges and Leaders.

^4: Guest performance by Kumaran and Divyadharshini for Rowdy Baby song.

=== Guests ===
- Vijay Antony - Grand Opening
- Aishwarya Dutta - Re-creation Round
- Aishwarya Dutta - Grand Finale

=== Grand Finale^{a} ===
- Winner - Lokesh & Megna
- 1st runner-up - Kumaran & Chitra
- 2nd runner-up - Vishal & Sreethu and Ramar & Rhema (points tied)
- 3rd runner-up - Atheesh & Uthra
- 4th runner-up - Britto & Anila
- 5th runner-up - Azeem & Shivani

^a: Star Vijay also celebrated "20 years of Dhivyadharshini" illustrating her career as an anchor in Vijay Television for the past 20 years during the Jodi Fun Unlimited Grand Finale. Dhivyadharshini was presented with a family portrait depicting her late father whom she lost at a young age in addition to a memorabilia award with illustration of all the shows that she hosted.

== Jodi R U Ready? ==
The tenth season aired from 20 January 2024 Angelina and Rio Raj hosted the season.

=== Host ===
- Rio Raj (former contestant)
- Angelina

=== Judges ===
- Meena
- Sandy
- Sridevi Vijaykumar
- Laila
- Nikki Galrani (Ep 23-24, 27-)

=== Contestants ===
#	Jodi		Week entered	Week exited	Status	Zone	Encounter faced	Top Jodi Won - Week
#	Contestants	Celebrities	Week entered	Week exited	Status	Zone	Encounter faced	Top Jodi Won - Week
1	Dhanush	Justina	Week 2		Finalist	–	1	3 (Week 9, 12, 13)
2	Vignesh	Raveena Daha	Week 2		Finalist	–	1	2 (Week 5, 7)
3	Priyadharshan	VJ Tarshika	Week 2		Finalist	–	2	2 (Week 6, 8)
4	Vinith	Krishna Shilpa	Week 2		Finalist	–	1	1 (Week 3)
5	Prajwal	Ramya Kole	Week 2		Finalist	–	2	2 (Week 4, 10)
6	Kabeer	Doley	Week 2	Week 14	Evicted	Diamond Zone	5	—
7	Rishi	Deepika Deedoll	Week 2	Week 13	Evicted	Diamond Zone	2	1 (Week 11)
8	Mohan	Divyadharshini	Week 2	Week 8	Encountered	Gold Zone	3	—
8	Mohan	Divyadharshini	Week 11	Week 12	Evicted	Diamond Zone	3	—
9	Prashanth	Thamizhselvi	Week 2	Week 4	Encountered	Silver Zone	3	—
9	Prashanth	Thamizhselvi	Week 7	Week 10	Re-encountered	Gold Zone	3	—
9	Prashanth	Thamizhselvi	Week 11		Evicted	Diamond Zone	3	—
10	Kalai	Deepika Damu	Week 2	Week 9	Encountered	Gold Zone	5	—
10	Kalai	Deepika Damu	Week 11		Evicted	Diamond Zone	5	—
11	Shubham	Reshma	Week 2	Week 6	Encountered	Silver Zone	2	—
11	Shubham	Reshma	Week 7		Evicted	Gold Zone	2	—
12	Sohail	Shubangi	Week 2	Week 5	Encountered	Silver Zone	1	—
12	Sohail	Shubangi	Week 7		Evicted	Gold Zone	1	—
