= List of Tamil-language television channels =

This is a list of television stations in the Tamil language.

== India ==
=== Government owned channel ===
- DD Podhigai - GEC from Doordharshan for Tamil Nadu

=== General entertainment channels ===
- Colors Tamil - part of JioStar
- Jaya TV - part of Jaya TV Network
- Kalaignar TV - part of Kalaignar TV Network
- Makkal TV
- Mega TV - part of Mega TV Network
- Polimer TV
- Puthuyugam TV - part of New Generation Media Corporation
- Raj TV - part of Raj Television Network
- Star Vijay - part of JioStar
- Sun TV - part of Sun TV Network
- Thanthi One - part of Dina Thanthi
- Vendhar TV - part of SRM Group
- Zee Tamil - part of Zee Entertainment Enterprises

=== Movie channels ===
- &flix - part of Zee Entertainment Enterprises - with Tamil audio feed
- J Movies - part of Jaya TV Network
- KTV - part of Sun TV Network
- Mega 24 - part of Mega TV Network
- Raj Digital Plus - part of Raj Television Network
- Sony Pix - part of Sony Entertainment Television - with Tamil audio feed
- Star Movies - part of JioStar with Tamil audio feed only on Saturdays
- Vijay Super - part of JioStar
- Zee Thirai - part of Zee Entertainment Enterprises

=== Music channels ===
- Raj Musix - part of Raj Television Network
- Star Vijay Music - part of JioStar
- Sun Music - part of Sun TV Network

=== Classic channels ===
- Murasu TV - part of Kalaignar TV network
- Sun Life - part of Sun TV Network

=== News channels ===
- Captain News - part of Captain Media Network
- Janam TV Tamil - owned by Janam Multimedia Limited (launching in 2023)
- Lotus News - Seventh Vision India Private Limited
- News Tamil 24×7 - owned by Splus Media Private Limited
- News18 Tamil Nadu - part of Network 18
- News7 Tamil - part of VV Group
- Polimer News
- Seithigal 24/7 - part of Kalaignar TV (P) Ltd.
- Sun News - part of Sun TV Network
- Thanthi TV - part of Dina Thanthi

=== Comedy channels ===
- Adithya TV - part of Sun TV Network
- Sirippoli - part of Kalaignar TV (P) Ltd.

=== Kids channels ===
- Cartoon Network - with Tamil audio feed
- Cartoon Network HD+ - with Tamil audio feed
- Chutti TV - part of Sun TV Network
- Discovery Kids - with Tamil audio feed
- Disney Channel - with Tamil audio feed
- Disney Junior - with Tamil audio feed
- ETV Bala Bharat - part of ETV Network
- Hungama TV - with Tamil audio feed
- Marvel HQ - with Tamil audio feed
- Nickelodeon - with Tamil audio feed
- Nickelodeon Sonic - with Tamil audio feed
- Pogo - with Tamil audio feed
- Sony Yay - with Tamil audio feed

=== Sports channels ===
- Sony Ten 4 - with Tamil audio feed
- Star Sports 1 Tamil - separate channel for Tamil, part of JioStar

=== Infotainment channels ===
- Animal Planet - with Tamil audio feed
- D Tamil (Discovery Tamil) - separate channel for Tamil, part of Warner Bros. Discovery India
- Discovery HD - with Tamil audio feed (HD version)
- Fox Life - with Tamil audio feed
- History TV18 - with Tamil audio feed
- Nat Geo Wild - with Tamil audio feed
- National Geographic - with Tamil audio feed
- Sony BBC Earth - with Tamil audio feed
- Travel XP Tamil - separate channel for Tamil, part of Celebrities Management Private Limited

=== Shopping channels ===
- HomeShop18 Tamil - 24x7 home shopping channel

=== Devotional ===
- Sri Sankara TV - Tamil and Kannada Hindu spiritual channel
- SVBC 2 - Tamil Hindu spiritual channel

== Malaysia ==
- Astro Box Office Movies Thangathirai - Tamil's hottest movies channel
- Astro Vaanavil - Tamil entertainment channel
- Astro Vellithirai - Tamil movie channel
- Astro Vinmeen HD - Tamil entertainment channel in HD
- Zee Tamil - General Entertainment Channel

== Singapore ==
- MediaCorp TV12 Vasantham - part of government owned MediaCorp TV12
- Vannathirai
- Zee Tamil

== Sri Lanka ==
- Nethra TV - entertainment; government owned by the SLRC, timeshift programming with Channel Eye
- Shakthi TV - entertainment; part of privately owned MTV Channel network, broadcasting in Sri Lanka
- Star Tamil TV - general entertainment; part of privately owned Voice of Asia Network
- Udhayam Tv - entertainment, privately owned by the SATIS Agency (Pvt) Ltd
- Vasantham TV - general entertainment; part of government owned Independent Television Network group

== Canada ==
- ATN Jaya TV - cable TV
- Star Vijay - cable TV
- Tamil One - cable TV, previously known as Tamil TV
- Tamil Vision International - cable TV
- TET - a part of Raj TV

== International ==
- Deepam TV - pro-Tamil; previously known as Thendral TV and Tharisanam TV
- IBC Tamil - London based news channel
- Tamil Television Network - France based

== Internet Protocol Television ==
- TVI On Demand

== All Tamil HD channels ==
=== India ===
- Colors Tamil HD
- KTV HD
- STAR Vijay HD
- Sun Music HD
- Sun TV HD
- Zee Tamil HD

=== Canada ===
- TET

=== Malaysian Peninsula ===
- Astro Vinmeen HD
- MediaCorp TV12 Vasantham HD

=== Audio feed ===
==== Kids ====
- Cartoon Network HD+
- Nick HD+

==== Infotainment ====
- Discovery HD
- Fox Life HD
- History TV 18 TRUE HD
- Nat Geo HD
- Nat Geo Wild HD

== See also ==
- List of Kannada-language television channels
- List of Malayalam-language television channels
- List of Tamil-language radio stations
- List of Telugu-language television channels
