= Television in Tamil language =

Television in the Tamil language traces its origins back to the 1990s. Key genres of television shows encompass serials, news programs, variety shows, game shows, movies, and documentaries. Many Indian-Tamil television programs are accessible on satellite and multicultural channels in overseas territories such as Sri Lanka, Malaysia, Singapore, Europe, the Middle East, and Australia. The pioneering private channel was Sun TV from India.

== History ==
The inception of Tamil language small-screen programming began in 1963 in Singapore and the 1980s in India. Initially, broadcasts ran from 7:15 pm to 11:15 pm daily, featuring programs in Singapore's four official languages (Tamil, Malay, Chinese, and English). Tamil programming initially aired on Channel 5 and later also on Channel 8. On 30 March 1973, Channel 8 became the dedicated Tamil-language service, with limited programming, after a decision taken by RTS to streamline the language sof the two channels. When Channel 8 started on 31 August 1963 with a pilot schedule, it aired the Tamil film Naan Petra Selvam. In India, there was only one national channel, the government-owned Doordarshan, which commenced broadcasting programs in Indian languages in the 1980s, although television signals had reached Chennai, the capital of Tamil Nadu, on 15 August 1975. Dubbing of Hindi series to Tamil became mandatory at DD Chennai in 1985.

The 2000s marked the golden era for the Tamil language television industry, witnessing phenomenal growth in every dimension.

== Television by country ==
=== India ===
The first Tamil television channels, Sun TV and DD Podhigai, were launched on April 14, 1993, in India. Businessman Kalanithi Maran established the first Tamil language TV station, Sun TV, which commenced broadcasting on April 14, 1993, initially offering four-and-a-half hours of programming per day under a time-sharing agreement with ATN. However, in January 1997, it transitioned to a 24-hour programming channel. The Sun TV Network recently launched a DTH service, making its channels available in several countries outside India.

On October 14, 1994, Raj TV was launched by Rajendran and became the second most popular channel in Tamil in the early 2000s. The same year, another channel called Golden Eagle Communication was launched by N. P. V. Ramasamy Udayar, which was later acquired by Star India in 2001. Star India took over the channel and rebranded it as Star Vijay.

On August 22, 1999, Jaya TV was launched in honor of the former Chief Minister of Tamil Nadu, J. Jayalalithaa.

The most recent channels and networks in the Tamil-based Indian broadcasting industry include Jaya TV, Kalaignar TV, Zee Tamil, Polimer TV, Colors Tamil, Vendhar TV, Makkal TV and Puthuyugam TV. Currently, the major four cable general entertainment channels that dominate the TRP rivalry are Sun TV, Star Vijay, Zee Tamil, Kalaignar TV, and Colors Tamil.

=== Singapore ===
Singapore Television Twelve split the former Channel 12 on September 1, 1995, with the existing channel being replaced by Prime 12, including Tamil-language programming on its schedule. The first Singapore Tamils channel, Vasantham Central, was launched on January 30, 2000. It was founded and is owned by MediaCorp. On October 19, 2008, Vasantham Central was relaunched as Vasantham.

=== Malaysia ===
The first Tamil Malaysians channel was Astro Vaanavil. It was launched on June 1, 1996, and created by Astro. The second general entertainment channel was Astro Vinmeen HD. It was launched on October 18, 2013. The channel is co-owned by Southeast Asia's second richest man, Ananda Krishnan, and Astro Malaysia Holdings.

Astro Vellithirai also launched on 16 April 2007 and is special for Tamil movie fans.

=== Sri Lanka ===
The Sri Lankan Tamils channel emerged in the early 2000s. On October 20, 1998, Shakthi TV was launched by Capital Maharaja. It quickly became the most popular channel in Sri Lanka.

=== France ===
The first France-based Tamil language satellite television channel, Tamil Television Network, was launched in June 1997. Its main audience was Sri Lankan Tamils living in Europe, the Middle East, and Australia. It was the first Tamil-language TV station outside India. The channel ceased broadcasting on May 2, 2007, when Globecast stopped relaying the channel.

=== Canada ===
The first Canadian-based Tamil language channel, Tamil One, was launched on September 6, 2001. Its main audience comprised Sri Lankan Tamils. The second entertainment channel, Tamil Vision International, based in Toronto, Ontario, was launched on September 7, 2001. It stands as the largest Tamil media outlet in North America.

The third entertainment channel, Tamil Entertainment Television, was officially launched on December 13, 2012, on Bell Fibe TV. It holds the distinction of being the first 24-hour Tamil channel in North America to broadcast in HD.

=== United Kingdom ===
IBC Tamil Television was launched in April 2015 at a ceremonial event in London. It became the second Tamil channel in the United Kingdom after Deepam TV. The channel was inaugurated with over 1500 people in attendance. Deepam TV had been launched in June 2000 and broadcasts round the clock from its studios in Hayes.

In 2015, the company announced an investment of £2 million in state-of-the-art digital studio equipment. As a result, the channel now produces nearly all its video content in HD through its studios in the UK, India, and Sri Lanka.

=== Australia ===
The first Australian-Tamil television channel, Sigaram TV, was launched in the early 2000s. However, in September 2006, due to bankruptcy, Sigaram TV ceased operations, and its existing subscribers were acquired by Tharisanam TV. In Europe, for a brief period in mid-2008, Tharisanam TV changed its name to Thendral TV due to a change in management. However, in Australia, the channel continued to operate as Tharisanam TV.

In October 2008, the channel rebranded as Global Tamil Vision. Today, Global Tamil Vision stands as one of the largest Tamil TV networks in the world.

== Streaming service (OTT) ==
Online video streaming, also known as Over-the-top (OTT) services like Hotstar, Sun NXT, ZEE5, Amazon Prime Video, Mediacorp, MX Player, and others, gained popularity among Tamil people after 2020 due to the COVID-19 pandemic. This trend posed a threat to the Tamil television drama industry.

== Channels by country ==
=== General entertainment ===
Channel	Launch	Owner	Country
Sun TV	14 April 1993	Sun TV Network	India
Raj TV	14 October 1994	Raj Television Network	India
Star Vijay	24 November 1994	Disney Star	India
Kalaignar TV	15 September 2007	Kalaignar TV Private Limited	India
Mega TV	19 November 2007	Mega TV Network	India
Vasanth TV	5 May 2008	Vasanth & Co Group	India
Zee Tamil	12 October 2008	Zee Entertainment Enterprises	India
Polimer TV	2009	Polimer Media Private Limited	India
Puthuyugam TV	23 October 2013	SRM Group	India
Vendhar TV	24 August 2014	SRM Group	India
Vaanavil TV	14 February 2016	Unknown	India
Colors Tamil	19 February 2018	Viacom18	India
Blacksheep TV	15 January 2023	Kalaignar TV Private Limited	India
M Nadu TV	15 January 2023	TN Networks private limited	India

== See also ==
- List of Tamil-language television channels in India
- List of Tamil-language television channels
- Tamil television drama
