= List of Tamil soap operas =

This is an incomplete list of Tamil television soap operas, broadcast on nationwide networks Sun TV, STAR Vijay, Kalaignar TV, Zee Tamil, Jaya TV, Raj TV, Polimer TV, Puthuyugam TV, Vendhar TV, Mega TV, Makkal TV, DD Podhigai, Captain TV, Vasanth TV, Shakthi TV, Vasantham TV, Nethra TV, MediaCorp Vasantham, Astro Vaanavil, Astro Vinmeen HD, IBC Tamil, Global Tamil Vision, and Deepam TV.

== By debut year ==
=== 2023 ===
Opening		Title	Tamil Title	Network(s)	Status	Ref
January	23	Siragadikka Aasai	சிறகடிக்க ஆசை	Star Vijay		
January	23	Mahanathi	மகாநதி	Star Vijay		
February	6	Kaalavarai	காலவரை	Mediacorp Vasantham	Ended	
February	6	Bharathi Kannamma 2	பாரதி கண்ணம்மா 2	Star Vijay	6 February 2023	
February	20	Seetha Raman	சீதா ராமன்	Zee Tamil		
February	21	Yaar? 4	யார்? 4	Mediacorp Vasantham	Ended	
February	27	Malar	மலர்	Sun TV		
March	6	Mr. Manaivi	மிஸ்டர் மனைவி	Sun TV		
March	20	Aaha Kalyanam	ஆஹா கல்யாணம்	Star Vijay		
March	27	Ponni	பொன்னி	Star Vijay		
April	24	Modhalum Kaadhalum	மோதலும் காதலும்	Star Vijay		
May	8	Sandakozhi	சண்டக்கோழி	Zee Tamil		
May	17	Dear Diary	டியர் டைரி	Mediacorp Vasantham	Ended	
May	18	Vinaivazhi	வினைவழி	Mediacorp Vasantham	Ended	
May	22	Anna	அண்ணா	Zee Tamil		
June	26	Pudhu Vasantham	புது வசந்தம்	Sun TV		
July	17	Ranjithame	ரஞ்சிதமே	Kalaignar TV		
July	24	Meena	மீனா	Sun TV		
August	7	Kizhakku Vaasal	கிழக்கு வாசல்	Star Vijay		
August	28	Idhayam	இதயம்	Zee Tamil		

== 0–9 ==
Title	Original release	Cast	Episodes	Network(s)	Genre
10 Manik Kathaigal; 10 மணிக் கதைகள் (Ethir Veetu Payan, Theriyaamal Oru Kolai, Meendum Varuven, Kannamoochi, Karai)	6 January 2014 – 30 May 2014	Aravind Akash, Sanjeev, Vijay Adhiraj, Reshma Pasupuleti	102 (seasons: 05)	Sun TV	Thriller, Crime, Comedy, Romance, Drama
63 Nayan Margaal; 63 நாயன்மார்கள்	16 February 2014 – 5 June 2014	Sanjaym Santhoshi, Lavanya, Bhuvaneswari, Sai Shakthi	71	Thanthi TV	Social-Mythology
7aam Uyir; 7ஆம் உயிர்	1 June 2015 – 31 March 2016	Lakshmi, Suzane, Sowpna	210	Vendhar TV	Thriller
7C; 7ஆம் வகுப்பு சி பிரிவு	7 May 2012 – 20 September 2013	Stalin, Senthil Kumar, Subathira, Aishwarya	343 + 9 Farewell Episode	Vijay TV	school, Comedy
777	2009	Shilpa, Babloo Prithiveeraj, Shipa, Rithiya, Bhanuprakash	20+	Polimer TV	Family, Drama

== A ==
Title	Original release	Cast	Episodes	Network(s)	Genre
Aachi International ஆச்சி இன்டர்நேஷனல்	5 January 1997 – 28 January 1998	Manorama, Crazy Mohan, Maadhu Balaji, Shivam, Vasukhi, Deepa Venkat, Kamala Kamesh	56	Sun TV	Comedy
Aaha ஆஹா	7 May – 14 September 2012	Bhanupriya, Seema, Benito Alex, Vani Bhojan	93	Vijay TV	Romance, Family
Aaha Kalyanam ஆஹா கல்யாணம்	20 March 2023 – 3 October 2025	Mounika Vikram Shri, Akshaya Kandamuthan, Gayathri Sri	643	Vijay TV	Romance, Family
Aanpavam ஆண்பாவம்	3 February – 15 June 2012	Rajesh, Meera Krishnan, Indraja, Aishwarya, Sujibala, Barath Kalyan	93	Sun TV	Family
Aaram Arivu ஆறாம் அறிவு	27 June – 28 August 2016	Shafinah Banu, Karthik Moorthy, Janani Devi, Dhurrgah Mathivanan	32	MediaCorp Vasantham	Thriller
Aarthi ஆர்த்தி	3 January 2005 – 27 December 2008	Sithara, Vijay Adhiraj, Raja Ravindra, Y.Vijaya	1054	Raj TV	Family
Aasai ஆசை	6 January 2002 – 21 January 2005	Priya Mahalaskhmi, Sarath Sinivasan, Premsai, A.Santhy, Rajkanth, Neelima Rani	735	Sun TV	Family
Aasai ஆசை	6 June 2005 – 2 November 2007		577	Vijay TV	Family
Aathira ஆதிரா	30 March 2015 – 24 June 2016	Sree Vani, Charutha Baiju, Kanmani, Jai Dhanush, Boopathy	313	Sun TV	Horror, Revenge
Abhayam அபாயம்	1995–2003	Neelima Rani, Manjari, Vasuki, Rajasekhar, Manohar	300	Sun TV	Family
Abhi Tailor அபி டெய்லர்	19 July 2021 – 19 August 2022	Reshma Muralidharan, Madhan Pandian	398	Colors Tamil	Drama
Abhiyum Naanum அபியும் நானும்	26 October 2020 – 25 February 2023	Riya Manoj, Vidhya Mohan, Nidhish	726	Sun TV	Drama
Abirami அபிராமி	18 January 2010 – 30 December 2010	Gautami, Kalpana, Shanthi Williams, Krishna Kumar	175	Kalaignar TV	Family, Revenge
Acham Madam Airyppu Brindhavanam அச்சம் மடம் ஐரிப்பு பிருந்தாவனம்	2001–2004	Neelima Rani, Vanaja, Rajkandh, Manohar	323	Sun TV	Family
Adhe Kangal அதே கண்கள்	17 February – 26 September 2014	Maheswari, Bharathi	156	Jaya TV	Horror, Thriller
Adhiparasakthi ஆதி பராசக்தி	2009–2010	Sukanya, Abitha, Sathish, Bhuvaneswari, Birla Bose	41	Raj TV	Devotional, Mythology
Adhiparasakthi ஆதி பராசக்தி	24 September 2010 – 25 March 2011	K. R. Vijaya, Praveena, O.A.K. Sundar, Anand, Mohan Vaidhya, Dr. Sharmila	211	Vijay TV	Devotional, Mythology
Adugiran Kannan ஆடுகிறான் கண்ணன்	3 February 2003 – 21 January 2005	Chetan, Abishek, Gayathiri, Dr. Sharmila, Venu Arvind	426	Sun TV	Family
Agal Vilakkugal அகல் விளக்குகள்	18 February 2002 – 2003	Rajashree, Vadivukkarasi, Anju, Pallavi, Nithya Ravindran	491	Sun TV	Family
Agni Natchathiram அக்னி நட்சத்திரம்	27 May 2019 – 3 April 2021	Varshini Arza, Gayathri Raj, Vasanth Kumar, Raj Kumar Manoharan	414	Sun TV	Family
Agni Pravesham அக்னி பிரவேசம்	14 September 2009 – 23 April 2010	Yuvarani, Deepa Venkat	785	Jaya TV	Family
Agni Paravai அக்னி பறவை	4 November 2013 – 16 May 2014	Simran, Madhumila, Manush, Dr. Sharmila	134	Puthuyugam TV	Family, Drama
Agni Satchi அக்னி சாட்சி	2002–2004	Easwari Rao, Venu Aravind, Devipriya	677	Vijay TV	Family, Drama
Ahalya அகல்யா	3 May 2004 – 22 September 2006	Manjari, Shyam Ganesh, Sakthi Kumar, Abser, Sanjeev, Dinki, Dhivyadharshini, Shreekumar	616	Sun TV	Family, Drama
Akka அக்கா	15 September 2014 – 9 April 2015	Kausalya, Nithya Das, Vadivukkarasi, Rajesh	143	Jaya TV	Family
Akka Thangai அக்கா தங்கை	2007–2008	Sujitha, Rajkumar, Srikanth, Bhavani	250+	Kalaignar TV	Family, Drama
Akshaya அக்ஷயா	1999-1999		37	Sun TV	Family, Drama
Alai Osai அலை ஓசை	1 April 2001 – 31 December 2004	Venu Arvind, Vijay Adhiraj, Devadarshini, Santhoshi, Priya, Subhalekha Sudhakar	875	Sun TV	Family, Drama
Alaigal அலைகள்	29 October 2001 – 28 May 2003	Venu Arvind, Jayachitra, Vadivukkarasi, M. N. Nambiar, A. L. Raghavan, Raaghav, Nizhalgal Ravi	403	Sun TV	Revenge, Family, Drama
Alaipayuthey அலைபாயுதே	23 December 2009 – 2010	Kausalya, Babloo Prithiveeraj, Fathima Babu, Lakshmi, Gowtham	200+	Jaya TV	Psychological thriller, Family, Drama
Alaipayuthey அலைபாயுதே	16 January – 30 March 2017	A. Panneeirchelvam, Puravalan Narayanasamy, Jenani, Jayaganesh	43	MediaCorp Vasantham	Romance, Family, Drama
All in All Alamelu ஆல் இன் ஆல் அலமேலு	30 April – 12 November 2012	Nalini, Kumareshan, Swaminathan, Roopa Sree, Shopnam	133	KTV	Comedy
Ambigai அம்பிகை	2002–2006	Roopa Sree, Manjari, Kavitha, Neepa		Sun TV	Family, Drama
Amma அம்மா	6 October 2002 – 30 April 2004	Bhanupriya, Ajaykapoor, Ajay Rathnam, Vadivukkarasi	613	Sun TV	Family
Amman அம்மன்	9 May 2009 – 30 February 2010	Yamuna, Gayathiri, Rajasekar, Bharath Kalyan	80	Sun TV	Devotional, Mythology
Amman அம்மன்		Praveena	334	Vijay TV	Devotional, Mythology
Amudha Oru Aacharyakuri அமுதா ஒரு ஆச்சரியக்குறி	4 June 2012 – 30 August 2013	Renuka, Kavithalaya Krishnan, Kavya, Apser, Shilpa	266	Kalaignar TV	Family, Drama
Ananda Bhavan ஆனந்தபவன்	2001–2002	Chetan, Delhi Kumar, Sachu, Kavithalaya Krishnan, Vanaja, Anand	60	Sun TV	Comedy
Anandham ஆனந்தம்	24 November 2003 – 27 February 2009	Sukanya, Brinda Das, Delhi Kumar, Kamalesh, Saakshi Siva, Vanaja, Janavi.	1297	Sun TV	Family, Revenge, Drama
Anantham Vilayadum Veedu ஆனந்தம் விளையாடும் வீடு	17 November 2008 – 26 June 2009	Mounika, Subhalekha Sudhakar, Devipriya	250+	Kalaignar TV	Family, Drama
Anantharamanin Thirumanam ஆனந்தராமனின் திருமணம்	1999–2002	Subhalekha Sudhakar, Y. G. Mahendra, Kutty Padmini	360+	Sun TV	Comedy, Family, Drama
Anbe Vaa அன்பே வா	15 June 2009 – 11 February 2010	Arjun, Sonu Satheeshkumar, Abirami, Hemalatha, Arun Piravu, Gowtham, Rajasekhar	122	Vijay TV	Romance
Anbu Manam அன்பு மனம்	1998–2000	Revathi, Gayatri Jayaraman, Siva Kumar		Sun TV	Family
Anbulla Snegithey அன்புள்ள சிநேகிதி	2001–2002	Anu Hasan, Swarnamalya	102	Sun TV	Friendship, Family, Drama
Andal Alagar ஆண்டாள் அழகர்	8 September 2014 – 6 May 2016	Rishikesh, Kalyani, Stalin, Ramya	416	Vijay TV	Romance, Family
Andha Pathu Naatkal அந்த 10 நாட்கள்	16 July 2012 – 27 July 2012	Srividhya, Kumar, Aarthi	10	Sun TV	Thriller
Anitha Vanitha அனிதா வனிதா	2005	Vanaja, Gayatri	67	Sun TV	Comedy
Anjali அஞ்சலி	27 November 2006 – 25 April 2008	Mallika, Prajin, Devadarshini, Poovilangu Mohan, Subhalekha Sudhakar	358	Sun TV	Psychological thriller, Family, Melodrama
Anni அண்ணி	2003 -2005	Malavika Avinash, Subhalekha Sudhakar, Deepak Dinkar	339	Jaya TV	Family
Annakodiyum Aindhu Pengalum அன்னக்கொடியும் ஐந்து பெண்களும்	23 February 2015 – 9 December 2016	Shruthi Raj, Lakshmi, Venkat, Deepa, Jagathish	460	Zee Tamil	Legal drama, Romance, Family
Annamalai அண்ணாமலை	11 February 2002 – 21 January 2005	Radhika, Sivakumar, Viji Chandrasekhar, Shyam Ganesh, Ponvannan, Devadarshini	757	Sun TV	Family, Melodrama
Annamalai Season 1 அண்ணாமலை 1	22 December 2014 – 31 March 2015	James Kumar, Karthik Samasundram, Bharathi, Varman, Sri, Jemes Dorairaj	48	MediaCorp Vasantham	Historical, Romance, Family Drama
Annamalai Season 2 அண்ணாமலை 2	29 June 2015 to 1 October 2015	James Kumar, Karthik Samasundram	52	MediaCorp Vasantham	Historical, Romance, Drama, Family
Annamalai Season 3 அண்ணாமலை 3	28 December 2015 – 31 March 2016	Sri Venkatarageaven, Karthik Samasundram, James Kumar, Gayathri Segaran	52	MediaCorp Vasantham	Historical, Romance, Family Drama
Anupallavi அனு பல்லவி	26 April 2010 – 12 January 2012	Abhishek, Yuvasri, Deepa, Sangeetha	445	Sun TV	Family, Melodrama
Apoorva Raagangal அபூர்வ ராகங்கள்	10 August 2015 – 7 July 2018	Shruthi Raj, Mithun	859	Sun TV	Melodrama, Family
Appa அப்பா	29 May – 21 November 2003	Mohan Sharma, Deepa Venkat, Vagai Chandrasekhar, Vadivukkarasi, Neelima Rani, Meenakumari, Nithya Ravindran		Sun TV	Family
Appa அப்பா	2007	Kamlesh, Devipriya		Kalaignar TV	Family
Appanum Aathalum அப்பனும் ஆத்தாளும்	2011–2012	Sukanya, Viknesh, Rama	100+	Kalaignar TV	Family
Arangetram அரங்கேற்றம்	26 May – 10 October 2014	Sivaranjani, Sham, AC.Murali, Vijay Pirasanth	91	Puthuyugam TV	Suspense, Melodrama, Revenge
Arasi அரசி	2 January 2007 – 11 September 2009	Radhika, Siva Chandran, Venu Arvind, Santhoshi, Ajay Rathnam, Latha	685	Sun TV	Family, Police procedural
Asai Nilavu ஆசை நிலவு	2008–2009			Kalaignar TV	Family
Aranmanai Kili அரண்மனை கிளி	24 September 2018 – 27 March 2020	Monisha, Surya Darshan, Pragathi, Neelima Rani	462	Vijay TV	Melodrama
Arundhati அருந்ததி	10 October 2016 – 6 January 2017	Reshmi, Senthilnathan	75	Raj TV	Mystery, Thriller
Arundhathi அருந்ததி	13 May 2019 – 9 November 2019	Nikitha Rajesh, Darshak Gowda, Sonia Bose	150	Sun TV	Mystery, Thriller
Athu Mattum Ragasiyam அது மட்டும் ரகசியம்	2005–2006	Devadarshini, Neepa, Sneha Eshwar, Nambiar		Sun TV	Horror, Thriller, Devotional
Atthai அத்தை	2005–2006	Urvashi, Bhanu Chander, Rajeev, Roopa Sree, Dhivyadharshini	378	Sun TV	Family, Comedy
Athipookal அத்திப்பூக்கள்	3 December 2007 – 14 December 2012	Devadarshini, Sandhya, Sathish, Venkat	1272	Sun TV	Melodrama, Family
Athiyaayam அத்தியாயம்	25 September – 21 December 2017	Jabu deen Faruk, Varman Chandra Mohan, J. Arabvind Naidu	49	MediaCorp Vasantham	Workplace, Family
Aval அவள்	7 November 2011 – 15 March 2013	Sanjeev, Mahalakshmi, Lakshmy Ramakrishnan, Sreekala	339	Vijay TV	Melodrama, Family
Avalum Penthane அவளும் பெண்தானே	2004–2008		344	Zee Tamil	Family
Aval Appadithan அவள் அப்படித்தான்	7 November 2011 – 15 March 2013	Easwari Rao, Shilpa, O.R. Sundhar	109	Jaya TV	Revenge, Family
Aval Oru Minsaram அவள் ஒரு மின்சாரம்	26 October 2009 – 16 30 April 2010	Sharavani, Rajasekhar, Shivan Sinivasan, Shanthi Williams, G. Rani	100+	Kalaignar TV	Family
Avalukendru Oru Manam அவளுக்கென்று ஒரு மனம்	2008–2009	Santhoshi, Gowshik	100+	Zee Tamil	Family, Melodrama
Avalum Naanum அவளும் நானும்	26 February 2018 – 22 June 2019	Mounika, Amruth	380	Vijay TV	Melodrama
Avarkal அவர்கள்	6 January 2002 – 2 November 2007	Premsai, Gayathri Shastry, Sanjeev, Nithya Ravindran, Deepa Venkat, Neelima Rani, Manohar	1351	Sun TV	Family
Azhagana Natkal அழகான நாட்கள்	2008	Chaithanya, Neepa, Venkat, Iswarya, S.N.Lakshmi, A. C. Murali Mohan, Nithya Ravindran, Amarasikamani	150+	Kalaignar TV	Romance
Azhagana Ratchasi அழகான ராட்சசி	2007			Zee Tamil	Family
Azhagi அழகி	10 October 2011 – 4 March 2016	Viji Chandrasekhar, Kamal Deep, Soniya, Ilavarasan, Madhumitha	1101	Sun TV	Family, Melodrama
Azhagiya Tamil Magal அழகிய தமிழ் மகள்	28 August 2017 – 14 June 2019	Sathya Sai, Puvi Arasu, Subalakshmi	457	Zee Tamil	Romance, Sport, Family
Azhagiya Thamizh Magal அழகிய தமிழ் மகள்	26 September – 9 December 2016	Vikneswary Se, Bharathi, Narain, Leena, Shamini Gunasagar, Mahalakshmi	43	MediaCorp Vasantham	Family, Romance
Azhagu அழகு	20 November 2017–present	Revathi, Thalaivasal Vijay, Shruthi Raj, Gayatri Jayaraman, Aishwarya	478	Sun TV	Family

== B ==
Title	Original release	Cast	Episodes	Network(s)	Genre
Badri				Sun TV	
Baktha Vijayam பக்தவிஜயம்			200	Jaya TV	Social-Mythology
Bala Ganapathy பால கணபதி	14 September – 18 December 2015	Haripriya	65	Vijay TV	Fantasy, Drama
Bhairavi பைரவி		Neelima Rani	100		Social-Mythology
Bhairavi Aavigalukku Priyamanaval பைரவி ஆவிகளுக்கு பிரியமானவள்	29 January 2012 – 10 September 2017	Nithya Das, K. R. Vijaya, Aishwarya, Suhashini	285	Sun TV	Supernatural, Fantasy, Thriller, Procedural drama, Mystery
Bhantham பந்தம்	25 September 2006 – 29 May 2009	Rinthiya, Nalini, Deepak Dinkar, Neepa, Shreekumar	678	Sun TV	Family
Bharathi பாரதி	2007–2008	Kalyani, Sanjay, Kaveri	150+	Kalaignar TV	Family, Revenge
Bharathi Kannamma பாரதி கண்ணம்மா	25 February 2019 – 4 February 2023	Roshni Haripriyan, Arun Prasath, Raksha Chauhan, Lisha Khelge, Farina Azad, Sweety, Akhil, Roopa Sree, Rishi Keshav	1036	Star Vijay	Family, Drama
Bhavani பவானி	11 May 2009 – 23 April 2010	Bhavana, Neelima Rani, Subhalekha Sudhakar, Vadivukkarasi	116	Kalaignar TV	Family, Drama
Bommalattam பொம்மலாட்டம்	15 October 2012 – 22 October 2016	Sirija, Shreekumar, Absar, Preethi, Delhi Kumar	1150	Sun TV	Family, Romance, Drama
Brindavanam பிருந்தாவனம்		Sujitha, Ambika		Mega TV	Family
Bumperkulukal பம்பர் குலுக்கல்		Nirosha, Anand Babu		Jaya TV	Family, Melodrama

== C ==
Title	Original release	Cast	Episodes	Network(s)	Genre
Chandralekha சந்திரலேகா				Mega TV	
Chandralekha சந்திரலேகா	6 October 2014 – 8 October 2022	Shwetha Bandekar, Nagashree GS, Meenakumari, Baby Athina, Bhuvaneswari, Surekha, Rishi, Saakshi Siva	2304	Sun TV	Family, Melodrama, Romance
Chellakili செல்லக்கிளி	2 December 2013 – 12 April 2014	Vithiya, Saakshi Siva, Nalini	109	Sun TV	
Chellamadi Nee Enakku செல்லமடி நீ எனக்கு	11 December 2006 – 5 September 2008	Ajay Kapoor, Gayathri Priya, Sri Devi, Krithiga, Vadivukkarasi, Devi Priya	400	Sun TV	Family, Romance
Chellamay செல்லமே	14 September 2009 – 18 January 2013	Radhika, Radha Ravi, Saakshi Siva, Delhi Ganesh, Vijayalakshmi (Kannada actress), Devipriya	845	Sun TV	Family
Chidambara Rahasiyam சிதம்பர ரகசியம்	2004–2006	Krishna, Asok, Abirami, Arun	100+	Sun TV	Social-Mythology, Thriller, Devotional
Chinnathirai சின்னத்திரை	2014–2017			Shakthi TV	Drama
Chinna Papa Periya Papa Season 1–3 சின்ன பாப்பா பெரிய பாப்பா 1–3	2005–2007	Sripriya, Kalpana, Nirosha, M. S. Bhaskar, Mohan Raman, Seema, Pallavi Menon, Nalini, Devadarshini	216	Sun TV	Comedy
Chinna Papa Periya Papa Season 4 சின்ன பாப்பா பெரிய பாப்பா 4	15 November 2014 – 5 May 2018	Nalini, Nirosha, Jangiri Madhumitha, Chitra, Vetri	Sun TV	174	Comedy
Chithi சித்தி	20 December 1999 – 10 November 2001	Radika, Sivakumar, Anju, Latha Sethupathi, Yuvarani, Subhalekha Sudhakar, Hemalatha, Poovilangu Mohan, Ajay Rathnam, Riyaz Khan, Vijay Adhiraj, Deepa Venkat, Tharika	467	Sun TV	Family, Revenge
Chithi 2 சித்தி 2	27 January 2020 – 28 May 2022	Preethi Sharma, Nandan	580	Sun TV	Family, Revenge
Chithra சித்ரா	2007–2008	Anusha	150+	Deepam TV	Family
Chithiram Pesuthadi சித்திரம் பேசுதடி	9 December 2013 – 17 October 2014	Rathi, Priyanka, Vidhiya, V. Thiruselvam, Sathyapriya	217	Jaya TV	Family
Chinthamani சிந்தாமணி	2 January 2024	Maanya Anand, Arun, Vinitha Jaganathan, Venkat Subramanian, Sri Priyanka, Anandaraj	Sun TV		
Costly Mapillai காஸ்ட்லி மாப்பிள்ளை	2000	Kovai Anuradha, Sachu, Venu Arvind, Chanthirakala, Vatsala Rajagopal	45	Sun TV	Comedy

== D ==
Title	Original release	Cast	Episodes	Network(s)	Genre
Deepangal தீபங்கள்	14 July 2008 – 8 May 2009	Rajkanth, Vanaja, Bhavana, Nalini		Kalaignar TV	Family, Melodrama
Deivam Thandha Veedu தெய்வம் தந்த வீடு	15 July 2013 – 26 May 2017	Sudha Chandran, Roopa Sree, Meghna Vincent, Sravan Rajesh	992	Vijay TV	Family, Melodrama, Romance
Deivamagal தெய்வமகள்	25 March 2013 – 2018	Vani Bhojan, Krishna, Rekha Krishnappa	1466	Sun TV	Family, Romance, Melodrama, Revenge
Devathai தேவதை				Raj TV	Horror
Devathai தேவதை	1 July 2013 – 20 August 2016	Subhadra, Bhagya, T. Durairaj, Shobana	924	Sun TV	Family
Dharmayutham தர்மயுத்தம்	2008–2009	Kausalya, Deepa Venkat, Nizhalgal Ravi, Ajay, Gayathripriya, O.A.K. Sundar	200+	Mega TV	courtroom
Dharmayutham தர்மயுத்தம்	2 August 2012 – 11 January 2013	Abbas, Karthik Kumar, Anuja Iyer, Lakshmi Priyaa Chandramouli, Ravi Raghavendra, Raja Krishnamoorthy	104	Vijay TV	courtroom, Romance
Dhik Dhik Dhik திக் திக் திக்	1999	Sivakumar	40	Sun TV	Thriller, Crime
Dhik Dhik Dhik திக் திக் திக்	2007			Vijay TV	Horror
Dhinam Dhinam Deepavali தினம் தினம் தீபாவளி	2007–2008	Nalini, Sadhana, Oorvambhu Lakshmi, Pandu, Balaji, Aarthi, Chaplin Balu	150+	Mega TV	Comedy
Dinesh Ganesh தினேஷ் கணேஷ்	1990s	Kathadi Ramamurthy, Delhi Ganesh, Oorvambhu Lakshmi, Sulakshana		Doordarshan	Comedy
Dr. Narendiranin Vinodha Vazhakku டாக்டர். நரேந்திரனின் வினோத வழக்கு	1980s	Sarath Babu, Y. G. Mahendra, Poornam Viswanathan		Doordarshan	courtroom, Psychological thriller

== E ==
Title	Original release	Cast	Episodes	Network(s)	Genre
EMI-Thavanai Murai Vazhkai இ.எம்.ஐ தவணை முறை வாழ்க்கை	7 March – 29 July 2016	Shyam Sunder, Naresh, Vijay, Vikram, Haripriya, Pop Suresh, Naren Ram, Bhavani	104	Sun TV	Workplace, Romance
Enakkaga Vaa எனக்காக வா	1998–1999	Chandrasekhar, Devi Sri, Shivam, Radhabhai	365	Sun TV	
Ennakul Oruthi எனக்குள் ஒருத்தி		Vinothini, Suresh Chakravarthi, Balaji		Jaya TV	
En Iniya Iyanthira என் இனிய இயந்திரா	1991	Charu Haasan, Sivaranjani, Nila		Doordarshan	Fantasy, Family
En Iniya Thozhiye என் இனிய தோழியே	10 November 2014 – 26 February 2016	Srithika, Apsar, Ekavalli, Jeyaram, Reshma Pasupuleti, Apsara	332	Raj TV	Friendship, Melodrama, Family
Ennuyire என்னுயிரே	7 December 2015 – 30 March 2016	Aravind Naidu, Nithiya Rao, Jobu Deen Faruk and Bharathi Rani Arunachalam	62	MediaCorp Vasantham	Romance, Psychological thriller
En Peyar Meenakshi என் பெயர் மீனாட்சி	6 September 2010 – 4 March 2011	Harsha, Sidharth, Ravinthiran, Sindhu, Balaji, Vadivukkarasi, Delhi Ganesh	120	Vijay TV	Family, Romance
Ennavale என்னவளே	Radhika Preethi, Thaman Kumar, Nikhila Rao, Shamili Sukumar	19 February 2024	Sun TV	Family, Revenge	
En Peyar Ranganayaki என் பெயர் ரங்கநாயகி	7 February 2000 – 7 January 2002	Abhishek Shankar, Chetan, Indhu, S.N Lakshmi, M. S. Bhaskar	675	Sun TV	Family
En Thangai என் தங்கை	4 May 2015 – 2 January 2016	Pandiarajan, Ramya, Anu Mohan, Lakshmi Raj	405	Raj TV	Family
Enakkul Avan எனக்குள் அவன்	1999–2002		456	Sun TV	
Enga Veettu Penn எங்க வீட்டுப் பெண்	8 June – 30 October 2015	Harshitha, Y. G. Mahendra, Kavithalaya Krishnan, Yuvashree, Sonia, Birla bose	102	Zee Tamil	Family
Enga Veettu Penn எங்க வீட்டுப் பெண்	8 June – 30 October 2015	Harshitha, Y. G. Mahendra, Kavithalaya Krishnan, Yuvashree, Sonia, Birla bose	102		
Engiruntho Vandhaal எங்கிருந்தோ வந்தாள்		Geetha, Kavya Shekar, Bhanu Chander, Vijay Adhiraj		Jaya TV	Family, Romance, Drama
Ethanai Manithargal எத்தனை மனிதர்கள்	31 December 2000 – 2002	Sivakumar, Sarath Babu	502+	DD Podhigai	

== G ==
Title	Original release	Cast	Episodes	Network(s)	Genre
Galatta Kudumbam 1 கலாட்டா குடும்பம் 1	1999	Mounika, Ilavarasan, Kathadi Ramamurthy	47	Sun TV	Comedy
Galatta Kudumbam 2 (Galatta Sirippu) கலாட்டா குடும்பம் 2 (கலாட்டா சிரிப்பு)	1999	S. Ve. Shekher, Vanitha Vijayakumar, Sairam, Crazy Kumar, S. Ve. Shekher,	29	Sun TV	Comedy
Ganga Yamuna Saraswati கங்கா யமுனா சரஸ்வதி	2006–2008	M. S. Viswanathan, Manivannan, Renuka, Thalaivasal Vijay, Sithara, Pallavi	391	Raj TV	Family, Melodrama
Ilaigal காயத்ரி	6 December 2021 30 December 2027	Prem, Prakash, Sivakarthiyen, Rekha Lokesh, Vadivelu	1843	Vikatan TV	Family
Gayathri காயத்ரி	20 January 2004 – 7 November 2014	Neema, Veenu, Vijay, Akhila, Ragavi, Varalakshmi	201	Zee Tamil	Family, Melodrama
Geethanjali கீதாஞ்சலி	2009–2011	Deepa Venkat, Rajasekar, Banumathi, Shilpa, Bharath	450	Raj TV	Melodrama, Family
Girija MA கிரிஜா எம்.ஏ.	4 December 2006 – 2007	Priya Raman, Abhishek Shankar	150+	Jaya TV	Workplace, Family
Gokulathil Seethai கோகுலத்தில் சீதை	22 September 2008 – 23 October 2009	Sanghavi, Babloo Prithiveeraj, Delhi Kumar, Sulakshana	200+	Kalaignar TV	Psychological thriller, Melodrama, Family
Gopi கோபி		Bhanupriya, Vijay Adhiraj, Jeeva, Master. Bharathkumar, Mohan Raman,		Sun TV	Family
Gopuram கோபுரம்		Sarath Babu, Sadhana, Amritha, Tilakji, Vijay krishna raj, Deepa Venkat	321	Sun TV	Family
Gowravam கௌரவம்		Vadivukkarasi		Raj TV	Family
Guhan குகன்		Ravi Raghavendra, Sathish, Ravi Rakul, Chetan, Yuvasri, Dr. Sharmila	70+		Family

== I ==
Title	Original release	Cast	Episodes	Network(s)	Genre					
Idhayam இதயம்	10 August 2009 – 3 February 2012	Seetha, Nithya Das, Shreekumar, Nalini, Sanjeev	627	Sun TV	Family, medical, Romance, Drama					
Iru Malargal இருமலர்கள்	22 September 2025	Hima Bindhu, Santhosh, Jeevitha, Arun Karthi, Maanya Anand	030	Sun TV	Family, medical, Romance, Drama	Idho Boopalam இதோ பூபாளம்	1990s	Malaysia Vasudevan, S. P. B. Charan, Yugendran, Venkat Prabhu, Krishnan, Inba,	5	Family, Romance, Drama
Idhu Oru Kadhal Kadhai இது ஒரு காதல் கதை	28 March 2005	Prajin, Saravanan, Deepa	150+	Vijay TV	Romance					
Ilakkanam Maarudho இலக்கணம் மாறுதோ	1990s	Pratap K. Pothen, Nirosha, Vadivukkarasi, Kuyili	5		Family, Melodrama					
Ilakkanam Marumo இலக்கணம் மாறுமோ	5 November 2012 – 2013	Kavya, Aishwarya, Vicky, Vijay Anand	100+	Jaya TV	Family, Drama					
Ilavarasi இளவரசி	19 January 2010 – 1 November 2014	Santhoshi, Shrikar, Rachitha Mahalakshmi, Subhalekha Sudhakar, Anuradha	1263	Sun TV	Family, Melodrama, Romance					
Illatharasi இல்லத்தரசி	2013	Santhoshi	50+	Captain TV	Family					
Inai Kodugal இணை கோடுகள்										
Indhira இந்திரா	10 January 2000 – 30 April 2004	Gowthami, Vanaja, Rajeev, Baby prahasitha, Ravi Kumar, Premi	1166	Sun TV	family, romance, thrilling					
Inthavaanuku இந்த வானுக்கு	1990s									
Irandam Chanakyan இரண்டாம் சாணக்யன்	2002	Venu Arvind, Mohan Raman, Dr. Shamili, Sangeetha	51	Sun TV	Social-Mythology, Family					
Iru Kudukal இரு கூடுகள்		Sujitha		Mega TV (Tamil)	Family					
Iru Thaikku Oru Pillai Pirapathu Undu இரு தாய்க்கு ஒரு பிள்ளை பிறப்பது உண்டு				Sun tv	Family					

Ilakkiya 10 October Present

2022

== J ==
Title	Original release	Cast	Episodes	Network(s)	Genre
Jathimalli ஜாதி மல்லி					Family, Drama
Jalakreedai ஜலக்கிரீடை				Sun TV	Drama
Janani ஜனனி		Khushbu		Sun TV	Drama
Jananam ஜனனம்	2008–2009	Seetha, Chandra Bose, Jaya Sathya	150+	Mega TV	Thriller, Drama
Jannal: Ammavukku Rendula Ragu ஜன்னல்: அம்மாவுக்கு ரெண்டுல ராகு	1999	Sukanya, Seema, Anu Hasan, Kuyili	21	Raj TV	Family, Melodrama, Comedy
Jannal: Adutha Veetu Kavithai ஜன்னல்: அடுத்த வீட்டு கவிதை	1999	S. P. Balasubrahmanyam, Lakshmi, Poovilangu Mohan	39	Raj TV	Family, Melodrama
Jannal: Marabu Kavithaigal ஜன்னல்: மரபு கவிதைகள்	1999	Sukanya, Kuyili, Ravikumar (actor), T. V. Varadarajan	55	Raj TV	Family, Melodrama
Jannal: Sila Nijangal Sila Nyayangal ஜன்னல்: சில நிஜங்கள் சில நியாயங்கள்	1999	Nizhalgal Ravi, Poovilangu Mohan, Renuka	42	Sun TV	Family, Melodrama
Jeevan ஜீவன்	1990				
Jenmam X ஜென்மம் எக்ஸ்	1990				Thriller, Drama
Jeyam ஜெயம்	2008–2009	Nalini, Sudha Chandran		Jaya TV	Family, Melodrama, Revenge
Jeyippathu Nijam ஜெயிப்பது நிஜம்					

== K ==
Title	Original release	Cast	Episodes	Network(s)	Genre
Kaalabairavan காலபைரவன்	9 December 2013 – 25 August 2014	Sanghavi, Ragavan, Roopa Sree	177	Jaya TV	Thriller, Mystery, Police, Family
Kadamai Kanniyam Kattupaadu கடமை கண்ணியம் கட்டுப்பாடு	2014	Prajin, Suzane George, Syed Anwar Ahmed	10	Puthuyugam TV	Police, Crime
Kadambari காதம்பரி	2012	Sudha Chandran, Mithuna, Balaji	90+	Jaya TV	Mystery, Revenge
Kolangal-2 கோலங்கள்-2	14 October 2024	Devayani, Chandra Lakshman, Nirosha, Varun Udhai, Sri Priyanka, Nikhila Rao	300+	Sun TV	Family, Drama
Kadhal Pagadai காதல் பகடை	1996–1998	Rahman, T. V. Varadarajan, Renuka, Venu Arvind, Mohini, Mohan V. Ram	65	Sun TV	Romance, Family, Melodrama
Kadhalikka Neramillai காதலிக்க நேரமில்லை	26 November 2007 – 2008	Chandra Lakshman, Prajin, Srinath, Attakathi Dinesh, Aadukalam Naren, O. A. K. Sundar	155+	Vijay TV	Romance
Kaialavu Manasu கையளவு மனசு	1990	Prakash Raj, Geetha	55	Sun TV	Romance, Melodrama
Kairasi Kudumbam கைராசிக்குடும்பம்	22 April 2015 – 24 November 2017	Prakash Raj, Geetha	686	Jaya TV	Family
Kakki காக்கி	22 September 2008 – 2009	Karate Raja, Mathiazhagan	80+	Vijay TV	Action, Police
Kalasam கலசம்	14 July 2008 – 26 June 2009	Ramya Krishnan, Sudha Chandran, Kutty Padmini, T. S. B. K. Moulee	234	Sun TV	Revenge
Kalathu Veedu களத்து வீடு	2 November 2015 – 25 March 2016	Shankara Pandian, Devi Priya, Sivan Srinivasan, Anila	102	Vijay TV	Romance, Family, Drama, Revenge
Kalki கல்கி	2004–2006	Khushbu, Abhishek, Shyam Ganesh, Pooja, Gandhimathi, Delhi Ganesh, Aravind Akash	300+	Jaya TV	Drama
Kallikattu Pallikoodam கள்ளிக்காட்டு பள்ளிக்கூடம்	19 October 2009 – 6 May 2010	Sreeja, Ashwin	126	Vijay TV	Teen, School
Kalyana Parisu கல்யாண பரிசு	2008–2009	Gayathri Priya, Abser	300+	Kalaignar TV	Family, Drama
Kannana Kanne கண்ணான கண்ணே	2 November 2020 – 4 March 2023	Nimeshika Radhakrishnan, Rahul Ravi	727	Sun TV	Family, Drama
Kalyana Parisu கல்யாண பரிசு	10 February 2014 – 27 March 2020	Srithika, Arnav, Keerthi	1840	Sun TV	Family, Drama
Kalyanam கல்யாணம்	2 March – 7 August 2009	Meena, Yuvarani, Saakshi Siva, Delhi Kumar, Shanthi Williams	110	Sun TV	Family, Drama, Mystery
Kalyanam கல்யாணம்	4 April – 23 June 2016	Karthikeyan Somasundram, Nithya Shree, Jaya Ganesh Isuran	45	MediaCorp Vasantham	Family, Romance
Kalyanam (season 2) கல்யாணம் 2	3 July – 21 September 2017	Karthikeyan, Nithya Shree, Jayaram, Vishnu M. Anandh	45	MediaCorp Vasantham	Family, Romance
Kalyanam Mudhal Kadhal Varai கல்யாணம் முதல் காதல் வரை	3 November 2014 – 27 January 2017	Priya Bhavani Shankar, Amit Bhargav, Nivashini	583	Vijay TV	Family, Romance
Kalyani கல்யாணி				Vijay TV	Family
Kalyani கல்யாணி	2012–2013	Santhoshi, Raja, Vandhana, Swapana, Shree Devi, Nesan	210	Kalaignar TV	Family
Kana Kaanum Kaalangal கனா காணும் காலங்கள்	30 October 2006 – 28 April 2009	Hemalatha, Irfan, Shiva, Lingeswaran	500+	Vijay TV	Coming-of-age, Teen, Romance
Kana Kaanum Kaalangal Oru Kallooriyin Kadhai கனா காணும் காலங்கள் ஒரு கல்லூரியின் கதை	2011–2012	Karthik, Nisha Krishnan, Vetri, Irfan	250+	Vijay TV	Coming-of-age, Teen, Romance
Kanaa Kaanum Kaalangal Kalloori Saalai கனா காணும் காலங்கள் கல்லூரி சாலை	2013–2014	Kavin, Vetri, Irfan	200+	Vijay TV	Coming-of-age, Teen, Romance
Kana Kandenadi Thozhi கனா கண்டேனடி தோழி	2007–2008			Jaya TV	Family
Kanavarukaaga கணவருக்காக	25 October 2004 – 18 August 2006	Sujitha, Srinivas, Sulkshashana, Manjari	414	Sun TV	Family, Drama
Kanavugal Ayiram கனவுகள் ஆயிரம்	2004 – 2005	Vijayalakshmi, Dhivyadharshini	150+	Jaya TV	Teen, Family
Kanchana காஞ்சனா	23 July – 9 November 2012	Pooja Ramachandran, Kuyili	70	Vijay TV	Horror
Kanden Seethayai கண்டேன் சீதையை		Kausalya		Vijay TV	Thriller, Family
Kanmaniye கண்மணியே	28 October 2008 – 16 April 2010	Sadhana, Illavarasan, Shilpa, Bhuvana, Srisha, Neepa	340	Sun TV	Family, Drama
Kanmany கண்மணி	5 April 2004 – 13 January 2007	Shreekumar, Shamitha, Vanaja	700	Vijay TV	Family
Kannamma கண்ணம்மா	2 November 2015 – 29 April 2016	Sonia, Pollachi Babu, Kiruthika	100+	Kalaignar TV	Family
Kannamoochi கண்ணாமூச்சி					
Karthigai Pengal கார்த்திகை பெண்கள்	30 July 2012 – 23 August 2013	Shruti, Dr. Sharmila, Bhanu Chander	266	Sun TV	Family
Karunamanjari கருணமஞ்சரி	2009–2010	Sudha Chandran, Ajay Rathnam, Vanaya, Puspalatha	182	Raj TV	Family, Drama
Karuppu Vettai கருப்பு வேட்டை				Polimer	Thriller
Kasalavu Nesam காசளவு நேசம்	1999	Venu Arvind, Revathi Sankaran		Sun TV and Raj TV	Family
Kasthuri கஸ்தூரி	21 August 2006 – 31 August 2012	Easwari Rao, Niya, Latha, Delhi Ganesh, Neelima Rani, Sujatha Panju, Jai Krishnan	1,532	Sun TV	Melodrama, Revenge
Kathu Karupu காத்து கருப்பு				Vijay TV	Thriller, Document
Kavarimaangal கவரிமான்கள்		Sithara, Birla Bose		Jaya TV	Family
Kaveri காவேரி		Madhoo, Delhi Ganesh, Ajay Rathinam, Fathima Babu÷		Sun TV	Family
Kayitham காயிதம்	23 November 2013 – 16 May 2014	Divya Padmini, Dheena	139	Puthuyugam TV	Family
Keladi Kanmani கேளடி கண்மணி	6 April 2015 – 7 October 2017	Arnav, Krithika Krishnan, Sai Priyanka ruth	767	Sun TV	Family
Kelunga Maamiyare கேளுங்க மாமியாரே	2001–2002	Gayathri	457	Sun TV	Comedy
Kodi Mullai கொடி முல்லை	1 June 2009 – 14 October 2011	Devayani, Shri Durga, Nithya Ravindran, Abhilash, Charu Hassan	785	Raj TV	Family, Revenge
Kokila Enge Pogiraal கோகிலா எங்கே போகிறாள்	1997–2001	Easwari Rao		Sun TV	Family
Kolangal கோலங்கள்	24 November 2003 – 4 December 2009	Devayani, Nalini, Chandra Lakshman, Deepa Venkat	1,533	Sun TV	Family, Melodrama, Revenge
Krishna Cottage கிருஷ்ணா காட்டேஜ்		Nalini, Malavika Avinash		Jaya TV	Comedy
Krishna Laddu Thinna Aasaiya கிருஷ்ணா லட்டு தின்ன ஆசையா	2013–2014	Sandra Amy		Puthuyugam TV	Comedy
Krishnadasi கிருஷ்ணதாசி	14 February 2000 – 25 October 2002	Gemini Ganesan, Nagesh, Nalini, Ranjitha	359	Sun TV	Romance, Family
Kudumbam குடும்பம்		Ambika, Gayathri, Vadivukkarasi		Sun TV	Family
Kudumbam Oru Kovil குடும்பம் ஒரு கோவில்				Vijay TV	Family
Kula Deivam குலதெய்வம்	11 May 2015 – 13 April 2018	T. S. B. K. Moulee, Vadivukkarasi, Srithika	897	Sun TV	Family
Kulavilakku குலவிளக்கு	2002–22 October 2004			Sun TV	Family
Kungumam குங்குமம்	2002–18 June 2004	Khushbu		Sun TV	Family
Kurunji Malar குறிஞ்சி மலர்	2013 – 25 September 2014	Vijay babu, Aishwarya, Sai Latha	240	Kalaignar TV	Family

== L ==
Title	Original release	Cast	Episodes	Network(s)	Genre
Lakshmi லட்சுமி	24 July 2006 – 8 June 2008	Meena, Vijay Adhiraj, Lakshmi Gopalaswamy	483	Sun TV	Family, Drama
Lakshmi Kalyanam லட்சுமி கல்யாணம்	7 February 2017 – 23 June 2017	Yuvarani, Deepika, Sathiya Sai, Ashwin Kumar, Shyam	98	Vijay TV	Romance, Family
Lakshmi Vanthachu லட்சுமி வந்தாச்சு	2 February 2015 – 24 November 2017	Vani Bhojan, Saran Rajesh, Haripriya, Sulakshana	720	Zee Tamil	Family, Meloderama
Latchiyam லட்சியம்	2008–2009	Manjari, Deepa Venkat, Devan	250+	Kalaignar TV	Family
Lollu Sabha லொள்ளு சபா	2004–2007	N. Santhanam, Swaminathan, Lollu Sabha Jeeva, Lollu Sabha Balaji, Manohar	156	Vijay TV	Comedy
Lakshmi Stores லட்சுமி ஸ்டோர்ஸ்	24 December 2018 – 25 January 2020	Khushbu, Nakshathra Nagesh, Hussain	322	Sun TV	Family, Drama

== M ==
- Maadhu— Cheenu
- Maama Maaple
- Madhavi
- Madipakkam Madhavan
- Madisaar Maami
- Madurai
- Magal
- Mahaangalum Adhisayangalum
- Mahabharatham
- Mahalakshmi
- Mahan
- Maharani
- Mahanadhi
- Malargal
- Malli
- Mama Mapillai
- Mamiyar Thevai
- Manathil Uruthi Vendum
- Mangai
- Mangalyam
- Manikoondu
- Manjal Magimai
- Mannan Magal
- Manthira Vaasal
- Maragatha Veenai
- Marakka Mudiyuma
- Marmadesam
- Marmadesam – Edhuvum Nadakkum
- Marmadesam-Vidaathu Karuppu
- Marudhani
- Masala Kudumbam
- Maya
- Mayavi Mareechan
- Meendum Jeeno
- Meera
- Megala
- Mella Thiranthathu Kathavu
- Merku Mambalathil Oru Kaadhal
- Metti Oli
- Micro Thodargal
- Mohini
- Mr. Brain
- Mr.Thenaliraman
- Mudhal Mariyaadhai
- Mudivalla Arambam
- Muhurtam
- Mullum Malarum
- Mundhanai Mudichu
- Mundru Mugam
- Muthaaram
- Muthukkal (1996)
- My Dear Bootham
- My Name Is Mangamma
- Mythili

== N ==
- Naan Aval Illai
- Naanal
- Naanayam (1991)
- Naanayam (2007–2008)
- Nadhaswaram
- Nagamma
- Nagamma (Raj TV)
- Nagavalli
- Nalla Neram
- Nambikkai
- Namma Kudumbam
- Naam Iruvar Namakku Iruvar
- Nathi Enge Pogirathu
- Nayanmargal
- Nee Naan Aval
- Nenjathai Killadhe
- Netraya Manithargal (1988)
- Nila
- Nila Surian (MediaCorp Vasantham)
- Nilavai Pidipom
- Nimmathi
- Nimmathi Ungal choice-1 (1997)
- Nimmathi Ungal choice-2 (Kannamavin Kadhai)
- Nimmathi Ungal choice-3 (Triveni Sangamam)
- Nimmathi Ungal choice-4 (Mavilai Thoranam)
- Nimmathi Ungal choice-5 (Manasaatchi)
- Nishakanthi

== O ==
- Office
- Oru Kai Osai
- Oru Kaidhiyin Sila Kilai Kathaigal
- Oru Manithanin Kathai (1986)
- Oru Penninn Kathai (1998)
- Oviya

== P ==
- Pandian Stores
- Paarijatham
- Paartha Gnabagam Illayo
- Paasam
- Paava Mannippu
- Panam
- Panchavarna Kili
- Pandavargal
- Panjami
- Paasamalargalae
- Pasamalar
- Pattikal Jakkirathai
- Penn
- Penn (Makkal TV)
- Perai Solla Va
- Pillai Nila
- Pirivom Santhippom Season 1
- Pirivom Santhippom Season 2
- Priyasaki
- Poi Solla Porom
- Pondatti Thevai
- Ponnoonjal
- Poo Vilangu
- Porandha Veeda Pugundha Veeda
- Premi
- Priyamanaval
- Pudhayal Bhoomi
- Pudhu Pudhu Arthangal
- Puthu Kavithai
- Pudhumai Pengal
- Puguntha Veedu
- Puriyaamal Pirinthom
- Pushpanjali

== R ==
- Raguvamsam
- Raja Rajeswari
- Rajakumari
- Ramanujar
- Ramany vs Ramany
- Ramany Vs Ramany Part 2
- Ranga Vilas
- Rekha IPS
- Rekkai Kattiya Manasu
- Rettai Vaal Kuruvi
- Revathi
- Roja (Jaya TV)
- Roja (Mega TV)
- Roja
- Roja Kootam
- Romapuri Pandian
- Rudhraveenai
- Rudra
- Rudram
- Run

== S ==
- Sabitha Allies Sabapathi
- Sahana
- Sakthi
- Sakthi
- Saradha
- Saravanan Meenatchi Season 1
- Saravanan Meenatchi Season 2
- Sathileelavathi
- Selvangal
- Selvi
- Savithri
- Samsaram
- Sembaruthi
- Senthoorapoove
- Shanthi Nilayam
- Sherlock Mami
- Simran Thirai
- Singaaram Theru
- Sirappu Pattimandram
- Srippulogam
- Sithara
- Siva
- Siva Manasula Sakthi
- Siva Ragasiyam
- Sivamayam
- Sivasakthi
- Sivasankari
- Sollathan Ninaikiren
- Sondha Bandham
- Sontham
- Sondhame Endrallum
- Soolam
- Soorya IPS
- Soundaravalli
- Sorgam
- Sridevi
- Sundharakandam
- Suryaputhri
- Surya
- SuryaVamsam (Sun TV)
- Suryavamsam
- Sutramum Natpum
- Super Sundari
- Sumangali

== T ==
- Take It Easy Vazhkai
- Thadayam
- Thamarai
- Thangam
- Thangamana Purushan
- Thanthira Bhoomi
- Tharkappu Kalai Theeratha
- Thavam
- Thayumanavan
- Thee
- Theekkul Viral
- Theerka Sumangali
- Thekkathi Ponnu
- Thendral
- Thenmozhiyal
- ThenNilavu
- Thirumagal
- Thiru Mangalyam (Kalaignar TV)
- Thiru Mangalyam (Zee Tamil)
- Thirumathi Selvam
- Thiruppaavai
- Thiruvilayadal
- Thiyagam
- Thulasi (Kalaignar TV)
- Thulasi (Zee Tamil)
- Thuppaki Munaiyil Thenilavu

== U ==
- Udhayam
- Uravugal
- Uravugal Sangamam
- Uravugal Oru Thodarkathai
- Uravukku Kai Koduppom
- Uthiri Pookal
- Uyirin Niram Ootha
- Uyirmai

== V ==
- Vaadagai Veedu
- Vaazhkkai Kovilgal
- Valaiyosai
- Vallamai Tharayo (MediaCorp Vasantham)
- Vaira Nenjam
- Vaidhegi
- Vairaakkiyam
- Vallamai Tharayo
- Valli
- Vamsam
- Vanakkam Chennai
- Vani Rani
- Vanthale Maharasi
- Vanthana Thanthana
- Varam
- Varisukal
- Vasantham
- Vasool Chakravarthy
- Vazhve Mayam
- Veettukku Veedu
- Velai (1998)
- Velaikkaran
- Velan
- Vellai Thamarai
- Vennila
- Veppilaikkaari
- Vilakku Vacha Nerathula
- Vinayagar
- Visaranai
- Vishalam
- Vazhnthu kaatukiren
- Vazhkai

== Y ==
- Yaaradi Nee Mohini
- Yathumaki Nindrai
- Yazhini

== See also ==
- List of Tamil-language streaming television series
- Tamil television drama
