= List of Tamil-language television channels in India =

This is a list of Tamil-language television channels in India.

== Government-owned channels ==
Channel	Launch	Video	Audio	Owner
DD Tamil	1979	SD+HD	Stereo | 2.0	Doordarshan, Prasar Bharati
DD Pudhucherry	1976	SD	Stereo | 2.0	Doordarshan, Prasar Bharati

== General entertainment ==
Channel	Launch	Video	Audio	Owner
Sun TV	1993	SD+HD	Stereo | 2.0	Sun TV Network
Raj TV	1994	SD	Stereo | 2.0	Raj Television Network
Star Vijay	1994	SD+HD	Stereo | 2.0	JioStar
Jaya TV	1999	SD+HD	Stereo | 2.0	Jaya TV Network
Makkal TV	2006	SD	Stereo | 2.0	Makkal Tholai Thodarpu Kuzhumam
Kalaignar TV	2007	SD	Stereo | 2.0	Kalaignar TV Network
Mega TV	2007	SD	Stereo | 2.0	Mega TV Network
Polimer TV	2007	SD	Stereo | 2.0	Polimer Media
Vasanth TV	2008	SD	Stereo | 2.0	Vasanth & Co Group
Zee Tamil	2008	SD+HD	Stereo | 2.0	Zee Entertainment Enterprises
Puthuyugam TV	2013	SD	Stereo | 2.0	SRM Group
Vendhar TV	2014	SD	Stereo | 2.0	SRM Group
Colors Tamil	2018	SD+HD	Stereo | 2.0	JioStar
Thanthi One	2024	SD	Stereo | 2.0	Metronation Chennai Television Pvt Ltd
Sony Vizha	2026	SD+HD	Stereo | 2.0	Sony Pictures Networks India

== Movies ==
Channel	Launch	Video	Audio	Owner
Raj Digital Plus	1998	SD	Stereo | 2.0	Raj Television Network
KTV	2001	SD+HD 2.0	Stereo | 2.0	Sun TV Network
Mega 24	2007	SD	Stereo | 2.0	Mega TV Network
J Movies	2008	SD	Stereo | 2.0	Jaya TV Network
Murasu TV	2012	SD	Stereo | 2.0	Kalaignar TV Private Limited
Star Vijay Super	2016	SD+HD	Stereo | 2.0	JioStar
Zee Thirai	2020	SD+HD	Stereo | 2.0	Zee Entertainment Enterprises
Star Vijay Takkar	2022	SD	Stereo | 2.0	JioStar

=== Audio feed ===
Channel	Video	Audio	Owner
Sony Pix	SD+HD	Stereo | 2.0	Culver Max Entertainment

== Music ==
Channel	Launch	Video	Audio	Owner
Sun Music	2004	SD+HD	Stereo | 2.0	Sun TV Network
Mega Music	2007	SD	Stereo | 2.0	Mega TV Network
Isaiaruvi	2008	SD	Stereo | 2.0	Kalaignar TV Private Limited
Jaya Max	2008	SD	Stereo | 2.0	Jaya TV Network
Raj Musix	2008	SD	Stereo | 2.0	Raj Television Network

== Classic ==
Channel	Launch	Video	Audio	Owner
Sun Life	2013	SD	Stereo | 2.0	Sun TV Network

== News ==
Channel	Launch	Video	Audio	Owner
Sun News	2000	SD	Stereo | 2.0	Sun TV Network
Jaya Plus	2008	SD	Stereo | 2.0	Jaya TV Network
Kalaignar Seithigal	2008	SD	Stereo | 2.0	Kalaignar TV Private Limited
Raj News 24X7	2008	SD	Stereo | 2.0	Raj Television Network
Polimer News	2009	SD	Stereo | 2.0	Polimer TV Network
Thanthi TV	2012	SD	Stereo | 2.0	Metronation Chennai Television Pvt Ltd
News7 Tamil	2014	SD	Stereo | 2.0	VV Group
News18 Tamil Nadu	2015	SD	Stereo | 2.0	JioStar
News J	2017	SD	Stereo | 2.0	Mantaro Network
News Tamil 24×7	2022	SD	Stereo | 2.0	SPlus Media Private Limited

== Comedy ==
Channel	Launch	Video	Audio	Owner
Adithya TV	2009	SD	Stereo | 2.0	Sun TV Network
Sirippoli TV	2009	SD	Stereo | 2.0	Kalaignar TV Private Limited
Raj Nagaichuvai	2024	SD	Stereo | 2.0	Raj Television Network

== Kids ==
Channel	Launch	Video	Audio	Owner
Chutti TV	2007	SD	Stereo | 2.0	Sun TV Network
Blacksheep TV	2022	SD	Stereo | 2.0	Kalaignar TV Private Limited
ETV Bal Bharat	2021	SD	Stereo | 2.0	ETV Network

=== Audio feed ===
- Cartoon Network - with Tamil audio feed
- Discovery Kids - with Tamil audio feed
- Disney Channel - with Tamil audio feed
- Disney Jr. - with Tamil audio feed
- Hungama TV - with Tamil audio feed
- Nickelodeon - with Tamil audio feed
- Nickelodeon Sonic - with Tamil audio feed
- Pogo - with Tamil audio feed
- Sony YAY! - with Tamil audio feed
- Super Hungama - with Tamil audio feed
- Epic Kids - with Tamil audio feed
- ETV Bal Bharat - with Tamil audio feed

== Sports ==
- Sony Sports Ten 4 Tamil
- Star Sports 1 Tamil
- Star Sports 2 Tamil

== Infotainment ==
- Animal Planet - with Tamil audio feed
- Discovery Channel HD - with Tamil audio feed (HD version)
- D Tamil - separate channel for Tamil
- National Geographic - with Tamil audio feed
- Nat Geo Wild - with Tamil audio feed
- Sony BBC Earth - with Tamil audio feed
- Travel XP Tamil - separate channel for Tamil

== Devotional ==
- Jothi TV - Tamil Hindu spiritual channel
- Nambikkai TV - Tamil Christian spiritual channel
- Sri Sankara TV - Tamil and Kannada Hindu spiritual channel
- SVBC 2 - Tamil Hindu spiritual channel

== High-definition channels ==
- Colors Tamil HD
- DD Tamil HD
- Jaya TV HD
- KTV HD
- Star Vijay HD
- Star Vijay Super HD
- Star Sports 1 Tamil HD
- Star Sports 2 Tamil HD
- Sun Music HD
- Sun TV HD
- Zee Tamil HD
- Zee Thirai HD
