= List of Kannada-language television channels =

Below is the list of current satellite television channels in Kannada language, a Dravidian language widely spoken in the South Indian state of Karnataka. Apart from those in the below list, many other Kannada channels exist that are limited to certain cities or districts, run by local cable TV operators.

== State government-owned channel ==
Channel	Launch	Video	Audio	Owner	Notes
DD Chandana	1994	SD	Stereo | 2.0	Doordarshan, Prasar Bharati	Official channel of the State Government of Karnataka

== General entertainment ==
Channel	Launch	Video	Audio	Owner	Notes	
Sun Udaya	1994	SD+HD	Stereo | 2.0	Sun TV Network	First Kannada satellite channel to go on air Launched as Udaya TV, re-branded in March 2026	
Colors Kannada	2000	SD+HD	Stereo | 2.0	JioStar (formerly ETV Network)	Launched as ETV Kannada, re-branded in March 2015	
Zee Kannada	2006	SD+HD	Stereo | 2.0	Zee Entertainment Enterprises	First mainstream satellite channel in Kannada.	
Star Suvarna	2007	SD+HD	Stereo | 2.0	Asianet Star Communications, a subsidiary of JioStar (formerly Star India)	Launched as Suvarna; re-branded as Star Suvarna in July 2016	
Colors Super	2016	SD	Stereo | 2.0	JioStar	Second Kannada GEC from Viacom 18; launched in July 2016	
Zee Power	2020	SD	Stereo | 2.0	SD+HD	Zee Entertainment Enterprises	Replaced Zee Picchar On 23 Aug 2025

=== Defunct entertainment channels ===
Channel	Launch	Defunct	Video	Audio	Owner	Notes
Kasthuri TV	2007	2023	SD	Stereo | 2.0	Kasthuri Medias Pvt ltd	Kasthuri TV is the first Kannada family entertainment TV channel in Kannada, promoted by a Kannadiga.
Kalki Kannada	2015	2017	SD	Stereo | 2.0	White Horse Network Services	24X7 GEC channel in Kannada

== Movies ==
Channel	Launch	Video	Audio	Owner	Notes
Udaya Movies	2000	SD	Stereo | 2.0	Sun TV Network	Formerly known as Ushe TV. First movie channel in Kannada.
Star Suvarna Plus	2013	SD	Stereo | 2.0	JioStar	Second Kannada GEC from Asianet; known as Suvarna Plus until July 2016
Colors Kannada Cinema	2018	SD	Stereo | 2.0	JioStar	First regional movie channel from Viacom 18
Public Movies	2018	SD	Stereo | 2.0	Writemen Media	Third channel from Writemen Media

=== Defunct movie channels ===
Channel	Launch	Defunct	Video	Audio	Owner	Notes
Zee Picchar	2020	2025	SD	Stereo | 2.0	Zee Entertainment Enterprises	24x7 Kannada movie channel from Zee Entertainment Enterprises

== Music ==
Channel	Launch	Video	Audio	Owner	Headquarters	Notes
Udaya Music	2006	SD	Stereo | 2.0	Sun TV Network	Chennai, Tamil Nadu	Formerly known as Udaya 2 / U2
Raj Musix Kannada	2009	SD	Stereo | 2.0	Raj Television Network	Chennai, Tamil Nadu	First venture from Raj Television in Kannada
Public Music	2014	SD	Stereo | 2.0	Writemen Media	Bengaluru, Karnataka	Second venture from the company after Public TV

== Comedy ==
Channel	Launch	Video	Audio	Owner	Notes
Udaya Comedy	2009	SD	Stereo | 2.0	Sun TV Network	Launched initially as Sun Direct exclusive channel

== Kids ==
Channel	Launch	Video	Audio	Owner	Notes
Chintu TV	2009	SD	Stereo | 2.0	Sun TV Network	Launched initially as Sun Direct exclusive channel
Nickelodeon	2018	SD	Stereo | 2.0	JioStar	Kannada feed was launched in September 2018
Nickelodeon Sonic	2018	SD	Stereo | 2.0	JioStar	Kannada feed was launched in September 2018
Discovery Kids	2019	SD	Stereo | 2.0	Warner Bros. Discovery India	Kannada feed was launched in 2019
ETV Bal Bharat	2021	SD	Stereo | 2.0	ETV Network	launched in April 2021
Sony Yay	2021	SD	Stereo | 2.0	Sony Pictures Networks India	Kannada feed was launched in 2021
Pogo	2022	SD	Stereo | 2.0	Warner Bros. Discovery India	Kannada feed was launched in 2022
Cartoon Network	2023	SD	Stereo | 2.0	Warner Bros. Discovery India	Kannada feed was launched in 2023

== Infotainment & lifestyle ==
Channel	Launch	Video	Audio	Owner	Notes
Saral Jeevan	2016	SD	Stereo | 2.0	CG Parivar Global Vision	Claimed to be first Kannada infotainment channel
Ayush TV	2017	SD	Stereo | 2.0	Kamadhenu Telefilms	Claimed to be Kannada's first wellness and lifestyle channel
Discovery Channel	2019	SD	Stereo | 2.0	Warner Bros. Discovery India	Kannada feed was launched in 2019
National Geographic	2021	SD	Stereo | 2.0	JioStar	Kannada feed was launched in 2021

== Spiritual ==
Channel	Launch	Video	Audio	Owner	Notes
Sri Sankara TV	2008	SD	Stereo | 2.0	Kamadhenu Telefilms	Hindu devotional channel with Kannada & Tamil feed
Sri Venkateswara Bhakti Channel 2	2008	SD	Stereo | 2.0	Tirumala Tirupathi Devasthanams Trust	Hindu devotional channel with Kannada & Tamil feed

== Sports ==
Channel	Genre	Launch	Video	Audio	Owner	Notes
Star Sports 1 Kannada	Sports	2018	SD	Stereo | 2.0	JioStar	First sports channel in Kannada; launched on 29 December 2018
Star Sports 2 Kannada	Sports	2018	SD	Stereo | 2.0	JioStar	Replaced Star Sports First on 15 March 2025.

== News ==
Channel	Launch	Video	Audio	Owner	Notes
TV9 Kannada	2006	SD	Stereo | 2.0	ABCL Broadcasting	First 24X7 news channel in Kannada
Asianet Suvarna News	2008	SD	Stereo | 2.0	Asianet News Network	Known as Suvarna News 24X7 until January 2016
Kasthuri News 24	2011	SD	Stereo | 2.0	Kasthuri Medias Pvt ltd	Second venture from the company Kasthuri Medias after Kasthuri TV
Public TV	2012	SD	Stereo | 2.0	Writemen Media	First channel from Writemen Media
BTV News	2014	SD	Stereo | 2.0	Eaglesight Telemedia and Btvkannada Pvt Ltd	
News 18 Kannada	2014	SD	Stereo | 2.0	ETV Network & Network 18	Known as ETV News Kannada until September 2017
Raj News Kannada	2014	SD	Stereo | 2.0	Raj Television Network	Second venture from the company after Raj Musix Kannada
Prajaa TV Kannada	2015	SD	Stereo | 2.0	Samparka Infomedia	
Republic Kannada	2017	SD	Stereo | 2.0	Republic Media Network(Formerly VRL Media)	Formerly Digvijaya news 24×7
TV5 Kannada	2017	SD	Stereo | 2.0	Rana Broadcasting	Kannada channel from TV5 group
Power TV	2018	SD	Stereo | 2.0	Powersmart Media(OPC)	
News 1st	2020	SD	Stereo | 2.0	Olecom Media	
Vistara News	2022	SD	Stereo | 2.0	Vistara Media Private Limited	Vistara News was launched in November 2022
Zee Kannada News	2023	SD	Stereo | 2.0	Zee Media	Launched on 10 April 2023 (as a TV channel)

=== Defunct news channels ===
Channel	Launch	Defunct	Video	Audio	Owner	Notes
Udaya News	2000	2019	SD	Stereo | 2.0	Sun TV Network	First Kannada news channel; was also known as Udaya Varthegalu
Samaya News	2010	2018	SD	Stereo | 2.0	RSM Broadcasters	Known as Samaya 24X7 until 2013
Janasri News	2011	2018	SD	Stereo | 2.0	Yash Broadcasting Industries	
NewsX Kannada	2018	2019	SD	Stereo | 2.0	ITV Network	First regional venture for South India by ITV Network

== High-definition ==
There are currently four High-Definition channels in Kannada.

Channel	Genre	Launch	Broadcast	Video	Audio	Owner
Colors Kannada HD	GEC	3 May 2016	Own schedule	Full HD	Stereo | 2.0	JioStar
Udaya TV HD	GEC	6 March 2017	Simulcast	Full HD	Dolby Digital | 5.1	Sun Network
Star Suvarna HD	GEC	16 July 2017	Own schedule	Full HD	Dolby Digital Plus | 7.1	JioStar
Zee Kannada HD	GEC	3 November 2018	Own schedule	Full HD	Stereo | 2.0	Zee Entertainment Enterprises

== See also ==
- Media in Karnataka
- List of Kannada films
- List of Kannada magazines
- List of Kannada newspapers
- List of Kannada radio stations
- Lists of television stations in India
- Lists of global television channels
