= Pengal Neram =

- Title card
- Genre: Entertainment; Cookery
- Directed by: Raj TV
- Starring: Shri Usha
- Country of origin: India
- Original language: Tamil
- No. of seasons: 1
- No. of episodes: 854

Production
- Producer: Raj TV
- Production company: Raj Network

Original release
- Network: Raj TV
- Release: 21 October 2012 – present

Pengal Neram is a Tamil Entertainment show that premiered on 21 August 2012 and airs Monday through Friday on Raj TV. This show showcases the talents of women in various fields including cookery, art, craft, household chores.
