= Kasthuri TV =

- Country: India
- Broadcast area: Parts of Asia and Europe
- Network: Kasthuri Medias Pvt. Ltd.
- Headquarters: Bengaluru, Karnataka, India

Programming
- Language: Kannada

Ownership
- Owner: Anitha Kumaraswamy (Managing director)
- Sister channels: Kasthuri News 24

History
- Launched: 26 September 2007; 18 years ago
- Closed: 2023; 3 years ago

Links
- Website: www.kasthuritv.co.in

Availability

Streaming media
- JioTV: (India)

Kasthuri TV is a 24-hour General Entertainment channel broadcasting in Kannada-language. Based in Bengaluru, Karnataka, India, the channel is a part of Kasthuri Medias Pvt. Ltd.

== History ==
Kasthuri TV is a 24-hour Kannada Language Entertainment Television Channel was launched On 26 September 2007. This is the first Channel by a Kannidaga. Mrs.Anitha Kumaraswamy wife of former Karnataka Chief Minister H. D. Kumaraswamy is managing director of Kasthuri Medias Pvt. Ltd, initially airing 60 percent news and 40 percent entertainment programs.

Kasthuri TV is the only TV channel owned by a Kannadiga. All other Kannada TV channels are owned by other language people.

Taking pride that Kasthuri TV will be the first Kannada channel to have been started by a Kannadiga, Mr.H.D.Kumaraswamy said the idea was conceived by him in 1995, when he was producing films.

Mrs.Anitha Kumarswamy has promised to launch two more 24-hour TV channels, devoted to music and news.

"The channel will maintain its independence while telecasting news and views of political developments," says Mrs.Anitha Kumaraswamy, whose business interests include film production and distribution.

"In that way, we will not function like many other channels of other languages, which are controlled by politicians," she averts. Being Mr. H.D.Kumaraswamy's wife does not make her compromise on the values she has believed in. "My channel will be primarily a pro-Kannada Channel. This is the first Kannada TV channel owned by a Kannadiga. This is our major USP. All other Kannada channels are owned by people from other states. I have engaged the best people in my endeavour to give the best entertainment and news value to viewers," she says.

== Channels ==
Channel	Category	SD/HD Availability	Notes
Kasthuri TV	GEC	SD	
Kasthuri News 24	News	SD	
Kasthuri Gold	Movies	SD	tentatively launching March 2023
Kasthuri Music	Music	SD	tentatively launching March 2023

== Current Shows ==
- Baa Guru Tindi Tinnona
- Directors Special

== Former Shows ==
=== Serials ===
- Rajkumari
- Sreeni Loves Paadu
- Nagamandala
- Mamateya Kareyole
- Etu Ediretu
- Annayya
- Parinaya
- Jai Anjaneya
- Charulatha
- Chakravyuha
- Mangala Gowri
- Chandramukhi
- Asadhya Aliyandru
- Mouna Mathadaga
- Mannina Runa
- Anju Mallige
- Panjarada Gili
- Kavya Kasturi
- Nagamani
- Sai Baba
- Suppanathi Subbi
- Nee Nadeva Haadiyalli
- Aa Ooru E Ooru
- Mumbelaku

=== Cookery Shows ===
- Banuvarada Baadoota
- Kasthuri Kitchen
- NalaPaka

=== Reality Shows ===
- Miss Mahalakshmi
- Prerana
- Jabardast
- Chinnada Bete Season 2
- Henmakle Strongu Guru
- Jackpot Season 2
- Kabbadi
- Naane Rajkumari
- Chinnada Bete Season 2
- Comedy Ustad
- Kala Belaku Stars Of Karnataka
- Just Sangeetha
- Comedy Darbar
- Citizen
- Kamanabillu
- Rani Maharani Season 3
- Halli Duniya
- Saptaswara Season 3
- Rock N Roll
- Rani Maharani Season 2
- Seere Beka Seere
- Superstar
- Comedy Stars
- Jackpot
- Hrudayageethe Baredeninu
- Saptaswara Season 2
- Rani Maharani
- Dream Girl
- Super Samsara
- Idu Yaaru Bareda Katheyo
- D For Danger
- Geethanjali
- Jana Jana Kanchana
- Adurstha Lakshmi
- Preethiyinda Ramesh
- Talk Of The Town
- Haasyada Rasa
- Dum
- Saptaswara

=== Dubbed Shows ===
- Suryaputra Karna
- Hrudaya Geethe
- Aruna Raga
- Aa Rathri
- Crime Patrol

== See also ==
- List of Kannada-language television channels
- Television in India
- Media in Karnataka
- Media of India
