= Raj Musix Telugu =

Telugu language Television Channel

- Headquarters: Chennai, Tamil Nadu, India

Ownership
- Owner: Raj Network
- Sister channels: Raj TV, Raj News, Vissa, Raj Music Karnataka

Links
- Website: http://www.rajtvnet.in

Raj Musix Telugu is a Telugu language music channel, operated by the Raj Network in India. It was launched in March 2010. It is popular for Telugu movie songs and interactive shows. The channel is available on major cable and dish networks, and is also broadcast on the internet through TVU Networks.

== See also ==
- List of Telugu-language television channels
- Raj Network
