= Prakarana Tanikha Hantadallide =

Kannada suspense thriller film

- Theatrical release poster
- Directed by: Sundar S
- Written by: Sundar S
- Produced by: Chintan Kambanna
- Starring: Mahin Kuber; Raj Gagan; Chinthan Kambanna; Mutturaj T
- Cinematography: Mohan MS, Jagdish R
- Edited by: Nani Krishna
- Music by: Shiom
- Production company: Karadaayaama Studios
- Release date: 18 October 2024
- Country: India
- Language: Kannada

Prakarana Tanikha Hantadallide (English: The Case is Under Investigation) is a 2024 Kannada-language suspense thriller film. It was both written and directed by Sundar S and produced by Chintan Kambanna. It stars Mahin Kuber, Raj Gagan, Chinthan Kambanna, and Mutturaj T as lead characters. Prakarana Tanikha Hantadallide was released in theaters on 18 October 2024.

== Synopsis ==
Set against the dark backdrop of the drug trade, Prakarana Tanikha Hantadallide follows a determined police officer, portrayed by Mahin Kuber, as he investigates a series of brutal murders that shake the city. The narrative begins with the discovery of a decapitated body in a public area, identified as the brother of a local doctor. As the investigation unfolds, another chemist is found dead under similarly gruesome circumstances. With the body count rising, the police race against time to uncover the truth behind the murders, which are intricately linked to a drug mafia network.

== Production ==
The film was created by a group of theatre actors and was shot in multiple locations, including Bengaluru and Kanakapura. Produced under the banner of Karadaayaama Studios, the motion poster was released on their YouTube channel on 4 August 2024. The technical crew behind the film included cinematographers Mohan MS and Jagdish R, editor Nani Krishna, and music composer Shiom.

== Cast ==
- Mahin Kuber
- Raj Gagan
- Nata Gagan
- Chintan Kambanna
- T. Mutturaj
- B.J. Madhu
- Shivu Byra
- R. Ganesh
- Pradeep Kumar

== Reception ==
Shashiprasad SM from Times Now rated the film 2.5/5, noting that it "falls flat as a one-time watch" despite the earnest performances of its cast.

Madan Kumar from TV9 Kannada commented on the predictable twists in the story, suggesting that while it could have benefitted from more innovation, it remains a decent watch for a small film.

Priya Kerwashe of Asianet rated it 3/5, praising Mahin Kuber's performance and highlighting the need for more creativity in depicting crime situations.
