= Gokulathil Seethai (2008 TV series) =

- Genre: Soap opera
- Written by: dialogue Babu Yogeshwaran
- Screenplay by: Babu Yogeshwaran
- Directed by: C.J Basker
- Starring: Sanghavi; Babloo Prithiveeraj; Delhi Kumar; Sulakshana
- Theme music composer: Dhina
- Opening theme: "Kartinile"; Sadhana Sargam
- Original language: Tamil
- No. of episodes: 200+

Production
- Producer: Bhupathy
- Cinematography: R. Raghunatha Reddy
- Camera setup: Multi-camera
- Running time: approx. 20-22 minutes per episode
- Production company: Srithan Productions

Original release
- Network: Kalaignar TV
- Release: 22 September 2008 – 23 October 2009

Gokulathil Seethai is a 2008 Indian Tamil-language soap opera starring Sanghavi, Babloo Prithiveeraj, Delhi Kumar and Sulakshana. It replaced Attam Pattam and it aired on Kalaignar TV from on 22 September 2008 to 23 October 2009. This is the series through which Sanghavi made her debut into the television.

The show was directed by C.J Basker. It also aired in Australia Tamil channel on Global Tamil Vision. From 2017 the show was relaunched in Mega TV.

== Synopsis ==
The story starts in Palani with middle class girl named Sita. Gokul proposed to Sita and they get married with Sita's family's approval. However soon after getting married Sita learns of Gokul's psychosis and Sita decides to leave Gokul. Sita elopes from Gokul's house and starts a new life in Chennai but Gokul follows her there and again creates havoc in her life. Gokul plans to kill Sita.

== Cast ==
=== Main ===
- Sanghavi as Sita
- Babloo Prithiveeraj as Gokul

Sita Family

- Delhi Kumar (Sita's father)
- Meera Krishnan(Sita's mother)
- My Dear Bootham Abhilash (Sita's younger brother)
- Srithika (Sita's sister)

=== Supporting ===
- Ajay Rathnam
- Sulakshana
- Prajin/Sai Prashanth
- Balaji
- Manjari
- Usha
- Sanmukasundharam
- Ashok
- Sathish
- Durka
- Siva Kavitha

== Production ==
The series was directed C.J Basker, along with the directed crew of 1991-2010 Sun TV Serials Chithi (1999-2001), Manaivi (2004-2006), Anjali (2006-2008).

== Title track ==
The title track of this particular series was recorded in Mumbai.

It was composed Dhina and sung by Sadhana Sargam.

=== Soundtrack ===
Track list
No.	Title	Music	Singer(s)	Length
1.	"Katrinile (காற்றினிலே) Title Song"	Dhina	Sadhana Sargam	4:00

== Awards ==
The Mylapore academy 40th annual Television awards function, were held on September 20, 2009 at the Narada Gana Sabha Auditorium.

Year	Award	Category	Recipient	Result
2009	The 40 Mylapore Academy Awards	Best Dialogue	Babu Yogeshwaran	Won
2009	The 40 Mylapore Academy Awards	Best Screenplay	Babu Yogeshwaran	Won

== International broadcast ==
The Series was released on 22 September 2008 on Kalaignar TV. The Show was also broadcast internationally on Channel's international distribution. It airs in Sri Lanka, Singapore, Malaysia, South East Asia, Middle East, Oceania, South Africa and Sub Saharan Africa on Kalaignar TV and also aired in United States, Canada, Europe on Kalaignar Ayngaran TV.

- The show was relaunched in Mega TV at 20:30 (IST).
- In Australia Tamil Channel on Global Tamil Vision.
