= Thendral (disambiguation) =

Thendral is an Indian Tamil-language drama serial telecast on Sun TV.

Thendral may also refer to these Indian films:

- Thendral Sudum, a 1989 Tamil film
- Thendral Varum Theru, a 1994 Tamil film
- Thendral (film), a 2004 Tamil film
- Nadodi Thendral, a 1992 Tamil film
- Thendral Veesum, a 1962 Tamil film
- Thendral Vandhu Ennai Thodum, Tamil serial in Vijay TV.
- Thendrale Ennai Thodu, a 1995 Tamil film

== See also ==
- Global Tamil Vision, also known as Thendral TV, a European Tamil-language television channel
