= News Malayalam 24×7 =

Indian Malayalam Language Satellite Television Channel

News Malayalam 24x7
- Country: India
- Headquarters: Nettoor, Kochi, Kerala

Programming
- Language: Malayalam
- Picture format: 1080i (HDTV)

Ownership
- Owner: SPlus Media Limited (Thamizhaga Cable TV Communication Limited (TCCL))
- Key people: Sakilan Padmanabhan (chairman); Aboobacker Siddique Mechery (managing director); Ajith Kumar Ajanthalayam (Chief executive officer); M. P. Basheer (Chief editor); T. M. Harshan; Sanish Elayidom (news director)
- Sister channels: News Tamil 24×7

History
- Launched: 29 May 2024; 2 years ago

Links
- Website: newsmalayalam.com

News Malayalam 24x7 is an Malayalam language 24x7 television news channel which was owned by Chennai based television network, SPlus Media Private Limited (An subsidiary of Tamilnadu leading cable TV network Thamizhaga Cable TV Communication Limited (TCCL)) who operates their Tamil language news channel News Tamil 24×7. It was launched on 29 May 2024 and the channel airs news, discussions and reports without debates and the channel's tagline is സത്യം പറയട്ടെ (transl. Tell the Truth).

== See also ==
- List of Malayalam-language television channels
- Television in India
- Media in Kerala
- Mass media in India
