= Samaya TV =

Samaya News 24X7
- Country: India
- Headquarters: Bengaluru, Karnataka, India

Programming
- Language(s): Kannada

Ownership
- Owner: Ravipati Broadcasters Private Ltd.

History
- Launched: 20 June 2010; 14 years ago

Links
- Website: www.samayatv.in

Samaya News 24X7 (ಸಮಯ ನ್ಯೂಸ್ 24X7) was a Kannada television news channel that was the first of its kind to be owned by and targeted toward Kannadiga viewers. It was launched on 20 June 2010 with the tag line "Naija Suddigaagi" ("For real/true news"). Within one year, Samaya News 24X7 became the second-most viewed news channel in Karnataka. The channel was later bought by Karnataka's Industrial Minister Murugesh Nirani.

On 25 November 2013, Samaya 24X7's name was changed to Samaya News. It was made available as a direct-to-home platform on 25 January 2014. It is hosted by service providers Videocon D2H on channel 840 and Airtel Digital on channel 859. On 25 February 2014, Samaya News was made available to Sundirect customers on channel 273.

Samaya News changed hands and Management several times and was found itself in the controversies

== See also ==
- List of Kannada-language television channels
- Television in India
- Media in Karnataka
- Media of India
