= Public Music =

Indian Kannada-language television channel

PUBLiC Music
- Headquarters: Bengaluru, Karnataka, India

Programming
- Language(s): Kannada

Ownership
- Owner: Writemen Media Pvt Ltd

History
- Launched: 28 September 2014

Links
- Website: http://publicmusic.in/

Public Music is a 24-hour Kannada music channel presented by Public TV and Lahari Recording company. The channel went on air on 28 September 2014 and is based on Kannada culture. The piled up stock of Lahari Recording with every area of music is the main attraction.

== See also ==
- List of Kannada-language television channels
- Television in India
- Media in Karnataka
- Media of India
