= Just Sangeetha =

Just Sangeetha is a musical TV show in Kannada, telecast on Kasthuri TV. It is a first of its kind show format in South India.

The show features various well-known bands and artists from across Karnataka and also talented upcoming artists. The show is a confluence of culture, styles and genres of music wherein artists perform the version songs and also the covers. Various music genres like Hindustani Classical, Jazz, Carnatic, Reggie, Ghazal, Janapada Geete, Shastriya Sangeeta, Qawwali, rock, Indi-pop, Thumri, Sufi, Hip-hop, folk, devotional and more all blended into one color called Just Sangeetha.

== Featured artists ==
- Raghu Dixit
- Faiyaz Khan (Sarangi Player)
- Archana Udupa
- Hum-Drum (M. D. Pallavi Arun, Keith Peters, Sumith Ramachandran, Arun Kumar)
- Praveen D Rao
- Swarathma
