= Tharisanam TV =

Tamil-language satellite TV channel

- Country: Australia
- Broadcast area: Europe, Australasia, Middle East, North Africa

Programming
- Language: Tamil

Ownership
- Owner: Synergy Media Group

History
- Launched: January 2007
- Closed: 22 June 2008

Tharisanam TV was a Tamil language satellite television channel. Its main audience were Sri Lankan Tamils living in Europe, Australia and the Middle East.

== Launch ==
Tharisanam TV was initially launched on Thai Pongal day in January 2007 in Australasia, broadcasting via the Optus B3 satellite. The channel started broadcasting in Europe, Middle East and North Africa via the Eutelsat's Hot Bird satellite on 21 May 2007. Initially the channel broadcast programmes from Makkal TV, a Tamil Nadu satellite channel.

== Closure ==
Tharisanam's link to the Hotbird satellite was via an Israeli Satellite link company. The Sri Lankan government complained to the Israeli government because of Tharisanam's alleged links to the Tamil Tigers. The Israeli government exerted political pressure on the satlink company. Tharisanam ceased broadcasting on 22 June 2008 when the satlink company ceased relaying the channel.
