= Koppiyam =

- Also known as: Koppiyam - Unmaiyum Pinnaniyum
- Genre: Anthology; Crime
- Presented by: Karthika; Sivakumar
- Country of origin: India
- Original language: Tamil
- No. of seasons: 1
- No. of episodes: 2200+

Production
- Running time: 60 minutes

Original release
- Network: Raj TV
- Release: 2 October 2012 – 28 March 2021

Koppiyam is an Indian Tamil-language anthology and crime show that premiered on 2 October 2012 on Raj TV which shows the claims of paranormal happenings around Tamil Nadu. As of 2021, it is still on-air. It airs through weekday nights. The show has exceeded 2200 episodes and it ended on 28 March 2021.
