= Kalki Kannada =

- Country: India
- Broadcast area: India
- Headquarters: Bengaluru, India

Programming
- Language(s): Kannada
- Picture format: 1080p (HDTV)

Ownership
- Owner: White Horse Network Services Private Limited (WHN)

History
- Launched: 1 November 2015

Links
- Website: Official website

Kalki Kannada TV was a Kannada-language 24/7 General Entertainment television channel, owned by White Horse Network Services Private Limited (WHN). The channel went on air officially on Karnataka Rajyotsava day, 1 November. The channel claimed to have all its programs in HD quality and that it offers completely original shows with no remakes from any other shows of any language.

== Shows ==
=== Non - fiction ===
- Abhishekam, (a devotional show which shows various temples of Karnataka)
- Vishwaroopa, (a devotional show with philosopher and astrologer, Savithru Sharma)
- Paddu's Kitchen, (an exclusively vegetarian cookery show on hosted by actress, Padmaja Rao)
- Music Mall, (live interactive show where viewers can call and win prizes by answering cinema related quiz)
- Surabhi, (a women's show that discusses women related issues such as their health, beauty, fitness, parental issues, child health etc)

=== Fiction ===
- Anubhandha
- Amnoru
- Sevanthi Sevanthi
- Puttamalli
- Nee Iralu Jotheyali
