= Ayush TV =

Indian Kannada-language television channel

- Country: India
- Headquarters: Bengaluru,

Ownership
- Owner: AYUSH TV PRIVATE LIMITED

History
- Launched: 15 January 2017; 9 years ago

Links
- Website: www.ayushtv.com

Ayush TV is an Indian 24 hour health and wellness channel broadcast in Kannada language, focusing on holistic medicine and therapies. It is a free-to-air channel that is available via cable and satellite.

== History ==
The channel was inaugurated by Baba Ramdev on 16 January 2017 at Freedom Park, Bengaluru. Other guests who were present during the inauguration included Union Cabinet Minister for Programme Implementation and Statistics D. V. Sadananda Gowda, MLA's N.A.Haris, Dinesh Gundu Rao, Kannada film actor Upendra, B.M.Hegde, CEO of Sringeri mutt V.R.Gowrishankar, Vishweshwar Bhat, M.Harikrishnan (Managing Director of Ayush TV), G.Srinivasa (Director of Ayush TV) and a host of other dignitaries. The channel has been incepted by Kamadhenu Telefilms Pvt Limited who had started Sri Sankara TV. AYUSH TV completed its 3rd anniversary on 15 January 2019.

== Social impact ==
The channel aims to inculcate and promote the use of holistic medicine which has been forgotten of late due to the emergence of modern medicine.

== Bengaluru Maha Utsava 2019 ==
Ayush TV and Sri Sankara TV organized Bengaluru Maha Utsava 2019 at Freedom Park, Bangalore from 14 August 2019 to 3 September. The event aimed at promoting Indian culture, traditions and alternate form of medicine, i.e., Ayurveda, Yoga & Naturopathy, Unani, Siddha & Homeopathy saw a huge footfall. The idea of this event was appreciated by Hon'ble Prime Minister of India Narendra Modi & Minister of Environment, Forest and Climate Change and Minister of Information and Broadcasting Prakash Javadekar.

== Frequency details ==
| Name | Frequency |
|---|---|
| Channel | Ayush TV |
| Satellite | Gsat at 66 degrees east |
| Transponder | 4C (LM4CV) |
| Down Link Frequency | 3845 MHz |
| Symbol Rate | 28.800 MSPS |
| Video PID | 5401 |
| Audio PID | 5402 |
| Polarization | Vertical |
| Transponder | Tata Communication |
| Antenna Size | 9.2 Meters |
| Compression Channel | MEPG 4 420 |
| Contact Address | Kamadhenu Telefilms Private Limited, 8/5-2, New BEL Road, Near-FM Silks, RMV Extension, Bengaluru:560054 |
