= Raj News Kannada =

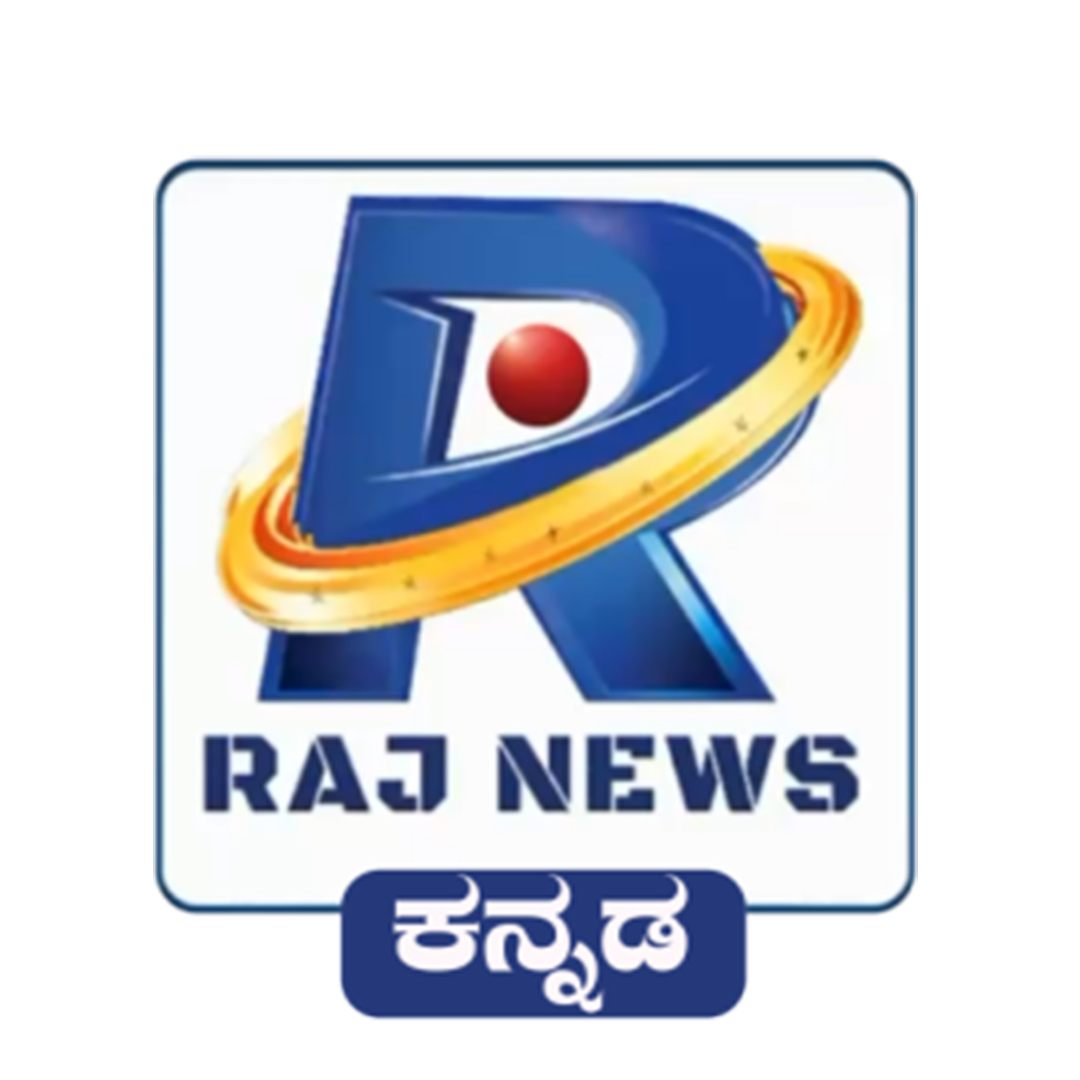
- Headquarters: Chennai, Tamil Nadu, India

Ownership
- Owner: Raj Television Network Ltd.
- Sister channels: Raj, Raj News, Raj Music

Links
- Website: https://rajnewskannada.com

Raj News Kannada is a 24-hour Kannada news channel news presented by Chennai-based Raj Television Network in Karnataka.It is taken over by Raj Television Network Ltd. It is available on major DTH platform videcon d2h, Tatasky, Airtel. and all cable networks

== See also ==
- List of Kannada-language television channels
- Television in India
- Media in Karnataka
- Media of India
