= Blacksheep TV =

Indian Tamil-language television channel

Kalaignar Chithiram
- Country: India; Sri Lanka
- Broadcast area: India
- Network: Kalaignar TV Private Limited
- Headquarters: Teynampet, Chennai, Tamil Nadu, India.

Programming
- Language: Tamil
- Picture format: 1080i HDTV (downscaled to 576i for the SDTV feed)

Ownership
- Owner: M. Karunanidhi
- Sister channels: Kalaignar; Kalaignar Seithigal; Kalaignar Murasu; Kalaignar Isaiaruvi; Kalaignar Sirippoli

History
- Launched: 3 June 2010; 16 years ago

Links
- Website: Official Website

Kalaignar Chithiram is an Indian Tamil-language kids television channel owned by Kalaignar TV Private Limited. The target audience of this channel are small children. It was launched on 3 June 2010.

== See also ==
- Kalaignar TV
