= Azhagiya Thamizh Magal =

Indian Tamil-language soap opera

- Genre: Soap opera
- Starring: Vikneswary Se; Bharathi; Narain; Leena; Shamini Gunasagar
- Theme music composer: Vicknesh Saravanan
- Country of origin: Singapore
- Original language: Tamil
- No. of seasons: 2
- No. of episodes: 43

Production
- Production location: Singapore
- Camera setup: Multi-camera
- Running time: approx. 20-22 minutes per episode 1 hour Last Episode

Original release
- Network: MediaCorp Vasantham
- Release: 26 September – 9 December 2016

Azhagiya Thamizh Magal (transl. 'Beautiful Tamil daughter') is a 2016 Singaporean Tamil-language soap opera, starring Vikneswary Se, Bharathi, Narain, Leena, Shamini Gunasagar, Mahalakshmi and among others. It aired on MediaCorp Vasantham every Monday to Thursday at 22:00 starting 26 September 2016 and 9 December 2016.

== Cast ==
- Vikneswary Se as Gowthami
- Bharathi as Radhika Prabhu
- Narain as Prabhu
- Vimala Velu as Amala Murali
- Vighnesh Wadarajan as Murali
- Leena as Poornima Rajesh
- Punithan as Rajesh
- Duraishiva as Girish Rajesh Teacher
- Grijisha as Deepika Rajesh
- Prakash as Girish Rajesh
- Shamini Gunasagar as Revathy
- Varman Chandramohan as Santhosh
- Shafinah Banu as Deepika's teacher
- Mahalakshmi as Sunthari
- Jamuna Rani as Prabhu's mother
- Jabu Deen Faruk as Mahen
- Malathy Madavan

== Original soundtrack ==
Background Score and Song were composed by Vicknesh Saravanan.

=== Soundtrack (OST) ===
Tracklist
No.	Title	Lyrics	Music	Singer(s)	Length
1.	"Azhagiya Thamizh Magale.."	Jaya Radhakrishnan	Vicknesh Saravanan	Kasthuri Saravanan	1:30

== Broadcast ==
Series was released on 26 September 2016 on Mediacorp Vasantham. It airs in [Singapore] on Mediacorp Vasantham, Its full length episodes and released its episodes on their app Toggle, a live TV feature was introduced on Toggle with English Subtitle.

== Awards ==
Pradhana Vizha 2022

- Best Young Star - Aashinnyaa
