= Ilavarasi (TV series) =

Indian television series

- Genre: Soap opera
- Written by: Ponkumaran
- Screenplay by: Guru.Sampath Kumar
- Directed by: N.Santanam (1-150); O.N Rathnam (150-500); M.K Arunthavaraja (500-1200); Sulaiman K.Babu (1200-1263)
- Starring: Santhoshi; Shrikar; Rachitha Mahalakshmi; Subhalekha Sudhakar; Anuradha Krishnamoorthy
- Theme music composer: Kiran (Theme Music/Background Music); CS.Jai kishan (Background Music)
- Opening theme: "Porantha Veettukkulla"; Nithyasree Mahadevan (Vocal); Snehan (Lyrics)
- Country of origin: India
- Original language: Tamil
- No. of seasons: 2
- No. of episodes: 1,263

Production
- Producer: Radhika
- Cinematography: RK.Vikraman
- Camera setup: Multi-camera
- Running time: approx. 20-22 minutes per episode
- Production company: Radaan Mediaworks

Original release
- Network: Sun TV
- Release: 18 January 2010 – 1 November 2014

Ilavarasi or Elavarasi (transl. Princess) is a 2010 Indian Tamil-language soap opera that aired Monday through Saturday on Sun TV from 18 January 2010 to 1 November 2014.

This 1263-episode show starred Santhoshi, Shrikar, Rachitha Rachu, Subhalekha Sudhakar, Arun Kumar and Anuradha Krishnamoorthy. It was produced by Radaan Mediaworks Radhika and director by N.Santanam, O.N Rathnam, M.K Arunthavaraja and Sulaiman K.Babu. It also airs in London Tamil Channel on IBC Tamil from 2016 and in Thanthi One from 20 May 2024.

== Plot ==
The story about Elavarasi (Santhoshi), a hard working woman who is the daughter of a carpenter. Born in a poor background with meager means, she works hard and overcomes unforeseen hurdles and obstacles in life and still takes good care of her family Illavarasi is a kind-hearted woman who comes from humble beginnings. The serial shows the family drama where the protagonist has to overcome unforeseen obstacles and still take care of her family.

== Cast ==
=== Main ===
- Santhoshi as Ilavarasi
- Manush Manmohan and Shrikar as Subramani
- Rachitha Mahalakshmi as Mahalakshmi IPS (Maha)

=== Supporting ===
- Yoginee and Keerthana as Nandhini (Anni)
- Sai Prashanth as Roshan
- Mahalakshmi as Philomeena, Chezhiyan's wife
- Bharath as Chezhiyan, Philomeena's husband
- Vasanth Gopinath as Shanmugam
- Rajashree as Jayanthi
- Vetri Velan as Shaam
- Krithika Laddu as Eshwari
- Swapna as Anamika
- Akhila as Kayalvizhi
- Arun Kumar Rajan as Swaroopan
- Srilatha as Bhanu (Swaroopan's mother)
- Archana Suseelan as Pooja / Narmadha
- Murali Krish as Krishna (Leela's husband)
- Sridevi Ashok and Sreesha and Srividya as Leela (Illavarasi's sister)
- Neelima Rani as Akilandeshwari 'Akila'
- Revathi Shankar as Rajeshwari
- Nithya Ravindran as Shyamala (Philomena's foster mother)
- Ramachandran as Philomena's foster father
- Sri Vidya Shankar as Philomena's biological mother
- Revathi Priya as Philomena's sister
- Vicky Krrish as Selva
- Jyothi as Deepa
- Giridhar Thirumalachary as Selva's father
- Padhmini Saravanan as Parvathi
- Raviraj as Deepa's father
- Subhalekha Sudhakar as Mohan Sharma
- Anuradha Krishnamoorthy as Lawyer Tamizharasi
- Sumangali as Jayanthi's mother (step mother of Ilavarasi)
- Pasi Sathya
- Dev Anand as Sivakumar
- Bhavani as Krishna's mother
- Kavya Varshini
- Asritha Kingini as Nirmala
- Kalpana Shree
- Rani
- Manjula Paritala
- Ravishankar as Elango
- Madhu Mohan as Chandramohan, Pooja's father
- Muthukuppusamy Rajashekar
- Azhagu as Selvapandi
- Kathadi Ramamurthy as Ilavarasi's father
- V.C. Jeyamani as Subramani's father

== Awards and nominations ==
Year	Award	Category	Recipient	Role	Result
2014	Sun Kudumbam Awards	Best Supporting Actress	Anuradha Krishnamurthy	Tamizharasi	Won
2014	Sun Kudumbam Awards	Best Son-in-Law	Arun Kumar Rajan	Sorupan	Won
2014	Sun Kudumbam Awards	Best Brother Award	Vasanth	Shanmugam	Nominate
2014	Sun Kudumbam Awards	Best Mamiyar	Padmini	Parvathy	Nominate

== See also ==
- List of programs broadcast by Sun TV
