= Kasthuri News 24 =

Indian Kannada-language television news channel

- Country: India
- Headquarters: Bengaluru, Karnataka, India

Programming
- Language(s): Kannada

Ownership
- Owner: Kasthuri Medias Pvt. Ltd.

Links
- Website: www.kasthurinews.com

Kasthuri News 24 is a Kannada News Channel (21 November 2011). It is the sixth Kannada news channel. It was launched by Anitha Kumaraswamy. The channel is a free to air channel. The channel is available for viewing via cable and satellite.

== See also ==
- List of Kannada-language television channels
- Television in India
- Media in Karnataka
- Media of India
