= Ennuyire (TV series) =

- Genre: Soap opera
- Screenplay by: Prema Pon Rajoo
- Directed by: Roja Tamilmaran; Kumaran Sundram
- Starring: Aravind Naidu; Nithiya Rao; Jobu Deen Faruk; Bharathi Rani Arunachalam
- Country of origin: Singapore
- Original language: Tamil
- No. of seasons: 1
- No. of episodes: 62

Production
- Producers: Roja Tamilmaran; Kumaran Sundram
- Editors: Steven Savdarajan; Prakash D
- Camera setup: Multi-camera
- Running time: approx. 22–24 minutes per episode
- Production company: Mediacorp Eaglevision

Original release
- Network: MediaCorp Vasantham
- Release: 7 December 2015 – 30 March 2016

Ennuyire (transl. Oh, my life) is an Indian Tamil-language soap opera that aired Monday through Thursday on MediaCorp Vasantham from 7 December 2015 to 30 March 2016 at 10:00PM SST for 62 episodes.

The show starred Aravind Naidu, Nithiya Rao, Jobu Deen Faruk and Bharathi Rani Arunachalam among others. It was produced and director by Roja Tamilmaran and Kumaran Sundram.

== Plot ==
The story of Ennuyire follows the lives of Gautham and Sathiya, the adopted sons of Aadhi, an illegal moneylender. Gautham falls in love with Harini and the incidents that results after that, forever alters the relationship between both brothers. Will Gautham be able to safeguard his love in the face of danger? This is a tale of how love can push a man beyond his limitations when faced with adversities.

== Cast ==
=== Main cast ===
- Shamini Gunasagar
- Aravind Naidu as Gautham
- Nithiya Rao
- Jobu Deen Faruk as Sathiya
- Bharathi Rani Arunachalam
- Morganavel Selvarajoo

=== Additional cast ===
- Balakumaran
- Vikneswary Se
- Kokila
- Subramaniyam
- Duraishiva as Guest Appearance
- Elias Mikhail
- Vaishnavi Chelvan
- Alikhan
- Vinathi Naidu
- Santhy
- Jegan
- Shafie Regum

== Original soundtrack ==
=== Soundtrack ===
Track list
No.	Title	Lyrics	Singer(s)	Length
1.	"Ennuyire Ennai Thindumada"	Jaya Rathakrishnan	Kausik Iyer	1:42
2.	"Hey Bro"	Jaya Rathakrishnan	Kausik Iyear, Dhivashini G	3:20
3.	"Yendi Yendi"	Jaya Rathakrishnan	Vicknesh Saravanan	1:30
4.	"En Uyire"	Jaya Rathakrishnan	Nishmen Nair
5.	"Mouna Pene"	Jaya Rathakrishnan	Vicknesh Saravanan

== Awards ==
Pradhana Vizha 2016

  - Best Direction (Drama) - Kumaran Sundaram
