= Tamil Entertainment Television =

Canadian Tamil-language television channel

- Tamil Entertainment Television logo
- Country: Canada
- Broadcast area: National
- Headquarters: Toronto, Ontario

Programming
- Picture format: 1080i (HDTV)

Ownership
- Owner: Tamil Entertainment Television Inc.

History
- Launched: December 13, 2012

Links
- Website: tethd.tv

Tamil Entertainment Television (TET) is a Canadian exempt Category B Tamil language specialty channel. It is an entertainment channel and is owned by Tamil Entertainment Television Inc.. TET is the first 24hr Tamil channel in North America to broadcast in HD.

Programming consists of serials, news, movies, music, religious programming, talk shows and more. Foreign programs are sourced from TET's official media partner- Raj TV, a Tamil channel from Chennai, India. TET also features original Canadian programming including news, talk shows and programs aimed at youth.

== History ==
Tamil Entertainment Television officially launched on December 13, 2012 on Bell Fibe TV. It launched on Rogers Cable on November 21, 2013.
