= Captain TV =

Indian Tamil-language television channel

- Country: India
- Network: Captain Media Private Limited
- Headquarters: Chennai-600 095, Tamil Nadu, India

Programming
- Language: Tamil

Ownership
- Owner: Captain Media

History
- Launched: 14 April 2010; 16 years ago
- Closed: 3 August 2023; 3 years ago

Captain TV was a 24-hour television channel started on 14 April 2010 by Desiya Murpokku Dravida Kazhagam which is a political party in the Indian state of Tamil Nadu. The managing director of Captain Media is LK Sudhish, brother-in-law of Vijayakanth who was the party's president and a Tamil actor.

Captain TV, a standalone Tamil General Entertainment Satellite Television Channel was launched on 14.4.2010, Equipped with latest technical Infrastructure. It was founded and is owned by Desiya Murpokku Dravida Kazhagam former chief captain Vijayakanth. Captain Tv & Captain News discontinued its broadcasts on 3 August 2023.

== Formerly broadcast ==
=== Dubbed soap operas ===
- Jai Sree krishna
- Mahaveera Hanuman
- Ammuvin cholla Thudikkum Manasu
