= Kalaignar Seithigal =

Indian TV channel

- Headquarters: Chennai, Tamil Nadu, India

Programming
- Language: Tamil

Ownership
- Owner: Kalaignar TV Private Limited
- Parent: Kalaignar TV
- Sister channels: Kalaignar, Kalaignar Sirippoli, Kalaignar Isai Aruvi, Kalaignar Murasu, Kalaignar Asia, Blacksheep TV

Links
- Website: kalaignarseithigal.com

Kalaignar Seithigal is an Indian television channel owned by Kalaignar TV Private Limited. The channel has a news format and is broadcast in Tamil.
