= Raj Music Karnataka =

Raj Musix Kannada
- Headquarters: Bengaluru, Karnataka, India

Ownership
- Owner: Raj Network
- Sister channels: Raj TV, Raj News, Vissa

Links
- Website: http://www.rajtvnet.in

Raj Music Kannada is a 24-hour music channel presented by Chennai-based Raj Television Network in Karnataka. This is the third Music channel for Karnataka. The channel went on air on 6 March 2009. Raj TV has tied up with MQ Networks Pvt. Ltd., a professionally managed multi media company for exclusively handling the Raj Music Karnataka operations in Karnataka. The channel became inactive and dull after a few months. However the channel was re-launched by the network on 14 February 2011. The channel was renamed as Raj Music Karnataka from Raj Musix Kannada along with the change in logo.

== See also ==
- List of Kannada-language television channels
- Television in India
- Media in Karnataka
- Media of India
