= News Tamil 24×7 =

Indian Tamil Language Satellite Television Channel

News Tamil 24x7
- Country: India
- Network: SPLUS Media Private Limited
- Headquarters: Chennai, Tamil Nadu, India

Programming
- Language: Tamil
- Picture format: 1080i (HDTV)

Ownership
- Owner: SPLUS Media Limited
- Sister channels: News Malayalam 24×7

History
- Launched: 23 January 2022; 4 years ago

Links
- Website: newstamil.tv

News Tamil 24x7 is a Tamil language news channel based in Chennai, Tamil Nadu, India. Launched on 23 January 2022, by SPlus Media Private Limited (An subsidiary of Tamilnadu leading cable TV network Thamizhaga Cable TV Communication Private Limited (TCCL)), the channel focuses on providing news, discussions, and reports in the Tamil language. The channel uses the tagline "Meiporul Kanbathu Arivu" (transl. Knowledge is Seeing Reality).

== Programming ==
The channel airs 24x7 news with a focus on regional, national, and international topics. Programming includes panel discussions, political commentary, and special reports.

== Controversies ==
In November 2023, a reporter from News Tamil 24x7 and others were involved in an incident at a pub in Chennai, leading to police complaints and FIRs being filed under various sections of the Indian Penal Code. The incident drew widespread media attention due to allegations of harassment and misconduct by some channel crew members.

== Distribution ==
News Tamil 24x7 is available on several local cable networks across Tamil Nadu but is not yet listed with major DTH providers. The channel is accessible on platforms like TCCL, TACTV, SCV, and others.

== Sister Channels ==
News Tamil 24x7 is part of a network that also includes News Malayalam 24x7, which began broadcasting in 2024.
