= Kalaignar TV (company) =

Indian Tamil-language media company

Kalaignar TV Private Limited
- Type: Private
- Industry: Mass media
- Founded: 6 June 2007 (19 years ago)
- Founder: M. Karunanidhi
- Headquarters: Chennai, Tamil Nadu, India
- Key people: Amirtham; Srinivasan Elangovan
- Products: Broadcasting; publishing; radio

Kalaignar TV Private Limited is a Tamil mass media company headquartered in Chennai, Tamil Nadu. Established on 14 April 1992 by M. Karunanidhi, it owns a variety of television channels in Tamil language and also radio station. Kalaignar TV launched its paid channel on 7 September 2022.

== History ==
On 15 September 2007 Kalaignar TV Private Limited launched Kalaignar TV is a general entertainment channel and Kalaignar Seithigal, is a 24-hour news channel. On 22 February 2008, it launched a music channel named Isaiaruvi. In September 2009, its sibling channel Sirippoli TV was launched, which airs non-stop Comedy channel. On 3 June 2010, launched Chithiram TV is a 24×7 Tamil Kids Channel. From 12 December 2022 It Was Fully Modified By Black Sheep Programs

On 26 January 2012, launched Murasu TV, is a 24-hour movie channel. . On 12 December 2022, launched Blacksheep TV is a General Entertainment Channel Replacing Kalaignar's Chithiram TV Programs

== Owned channels ==
=== On air channels ===
Channel	Launched	Category	SD	Ref
Kalaignar TV	15 September 2007	General Entertainment	SD	
Kalaignar Isaiaruvi	22 February 2008	Music	SD	
Kalaignar Seithigal	30 November 2008	News	SD	
Kalaignar Asia	2009	General Entertainment only in East Asia	SD	
Sirippoli	21 February 2009	Comedy	SD	
Murasu TV	26 January 2012	Movies	SD	
Chithiram TV	3 June 2010	Kids	SD	

=== Defunct channels ===
Channel	Launched	Defunct	Category	SD	Ref	Notes
Blacksheep TV	13 December 2022	24 October 2026	General Entertainment	HD		Replaced by Chithiram TV
