= Deepam TV =

European Tamil-language television channel

- Country: United Kingdom
- Broadcast area: Europe, Middle East, North Africa, worldwide via DeeBox
- Headquarters: Hayes, Middlesex

Programming
- Language: Tamil

Ownership
- Owner: Norcey Media network
- Sister channels: Thiracharal, Isaicharal, Deepam News, Kalakalappu

History
- Launched: 12 June 2000

Links
- Website: deepamtv.tv

Availability

Deepam TV is a UK-based Tamil Channel in Europe Tamil language digital satellite Free to Air (FTA). Its main audience are Tamils and Sri Lankan Tamils living in Europe and Asia.

The channel was launched in June 2000. The channel broadcasts 24 hours a day from its studios in Hayes (west London). The channel is available across Europe, West Asia and North Africa via Eutelsat's Eurobird 9 satellite. Also it is watchable worldwide via DBX. The channel is licensed to broadcast by Norwegian Media authority (Medietilsynet).

in 2013, Deepam Television Network has started four more 24 hours channels such as Isaicharal (Music Channel) Thiracharal (Movie Channel), Kalakalappu (comedy Channel) Deepam News (News Channel). These Channels are in full HD, watchable via DeeBox.

Deepam Radio Deepam Television network has started their online Radio in 2013. It is also available in DeeBox.
