= IBC Tamil =

London-based multimedia company

- IBC Tamil
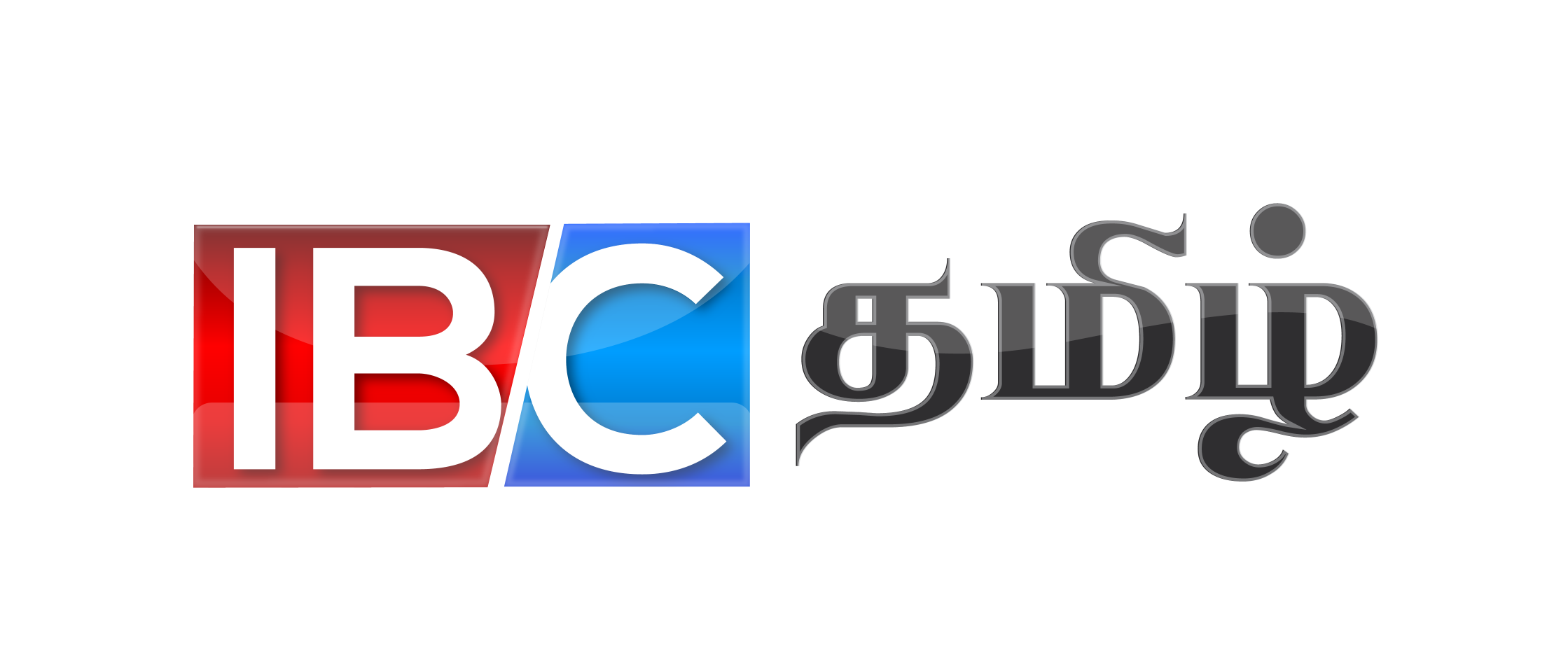
- Founded at: 1997, United Kingdom
- Type: Media
- Headquarters: United Kingdom
- Location: London
- Services: TV, Radio, Online
- Website: ibctamil.com

IBC Tamil (International Broadcasting Corporation - Tamil) is a mass media company offering 24-hour television, radio and online services to the Tamil diaspora. Headquartered in London, the company is licensed and regulated under European media law.

In 2015, the company announced that it invested £2 million in state-of-the-art digital studio equipment. The channel now produces nearly all its video content in High Definition (HD) through its studios in UK, India & Sri Lanka. IBC Tamil is available on several third party DTH satellite and OTT platforms around the world such as Asian Television Network, YuppTV and YouTube

== History ==
IBC Tamil was founded by Mr.A.C.Tarcisius and launched as a radio station in London on 9th June 1997 at WRN - Vauxhall, continued to voice for the Tamil diaspora around the world. From 2014 onwards, it is owned and run by London Tamil Media Ltd who, in April 2015, expanded the organization to include the television channel as well as a revamped news website updated round the clock.

== IBC Tamil Television ==
IBC Tamil Television was launched in April 2015 at a ceremonial event in London. Over 1500 people including prominent media personnel, celebrities and leading artists in the Tamil community attended the launch.

=== TV shows – current affairs and infotainment ===
==== IBC Tamil News ====
- Vanakkam Thamil
- Puthu Velichcham
- Gnayiru Vanakkam
- Unmayin Tharisanam
- Yaathum Oore
- Eela Thamilarum Sarvathesa Arasiyalum
- Ilavarasi
- Muranum Mudivum
- Vanakkam Thaainaadu
- Agam Puram
- Sarvathesa Pulanayvu
- Oorodu Uravaada
- Dineshin thedal
- Varthaga Nooku
- Airoppiya Neram
- France Neram
- Kaalakkuri

==== TV shows – Game shows and entertainment ====
- Nadana Raajas
- Thangakural thedal
- Paattukku Paattu
- Thamilukku thangam
- Short film express
- Kaasu mela
- Vanna Chittukkal
- Anthi Varum Neram (5 shows a week)
- Nadanthathu ennannaa
- Thiraikku pinnal
- Aaniye Pudunga Venam
- Kollywood Pakkam
- Vaadaa malar
- Ithaya Veenai
- Top 10 songs
- Nilavai Pidippom (Kids Show)
- Marma Kuzhal
- Patthodu Pathinondu
- Vilayadukalam
- The Lasya's Vrindrani Awards

== IBC Tamil Radio ==
Established in 1997, IBC Tamil radio is considered the largest and most popular radio station the Tamil diaspora. Its core audience is estimated to be over one million.

== IBC Tamil News website ==
Ibctamil.com is a news website updated round the clock. The website covers all prominent events in World Affairs with a focus on Sri Lanka and South India. This website is ranked top 100 websites in Sri Lanka.
