= Sri Sankara TV =

Indian television channel

Sri Sankara
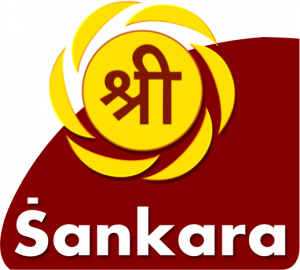
- Country: India
- Headquarters: Bengaluru, Chennai

Programming
- Languages: Kannada, Tamil

Ownership
- Owner: Kamadhenu Telefilms Private Limited
- Sister channels: Ayush TV

History
- Launched: 21 December 2008; 17 years ago

Links
- Website: www.srisankaratv.com

Sri Sankara TV is a national multilingual spiritual channel launched on 21 December 2008 owned and operated by M/S Kamadhenu Telefilms Private Limited. Since its inception in 2008, it has broadcast programmes depicting and promoting Indian culture and traditions. The channel programming includes programmes on Hindu Religion, Bhajans and religious discourses.

== Entry into Guinness World Records for longest variety show ==
It entered the Guinness World Records for 'The Longest Variety Show' which lasted 100 hours, 49 minutes and organized by Ranjini Kalakendra and Sri Sankara TV on 6–10 February 2015. During the 5 days and 4 nights a total of 4,156 artists joined the record attempt. The participants covered more than 100 varieties of 16 main art disciplines for a total of 751 performances.

== Bhajana Samrata ==
Sri Sankara TV has been consistently organizing 'Bhajana Samrata', a national level 'Bhajana' rendering competition successfully for the past six years. The winners of this competition are felicitated with cash awards and certificates from renowned personalities in the field of music, film and arts. Some of the celebrity judges of grand finale of Bhajana Samrata during the previous editions are Anup Jalota, Sudha Ragunathan and Sri K.S.Mallikarjuna Bhagavathar, Kavitha Krishnamurthy and many other elite personalities in the field of music.

== Bengaluru Maha Utsava 2019 ==
Sri Sankara TV & Ayush TV organized Bengaluru Maha Utsava 2019 - a conclave of religious, cultural and health extravaganza at Freedom Park, Bangalore from 14 August to 3 September 2019. The idea of this event promoting Indian culture, traditions and AYUSH form of medicine was appreciated by Hon'ble Prime Minister of India Narendra Modi & Union Minister for Environment, Forest and Climate Change and Minister of Information and Broadcasting Prakash Javadekar.

== Frequency details ==
Name	Frequency
Channel	Sri Sankara TV
Satellite	Intelsat 17 at 66 degrees east
Transponder	Tata Communication
Down Link Frequency	4015 MHz
Symbol Rate	30.000 MSPS
FEC	(3/4)
Video PID	1701
Tamil Audio PID	1702
Kannada Audio PID	1703
Polarization	Vertical
PCR PID	1701
SCR Status	FTA
Audio Count	2
Antenna	Dish
Contact Address	Kamadhenu Telefilms Private Limited, 8/5-2, New BEL Road, Near-FM Silks, RMV Extension, Bengaluru:560054
