= Kalaignar TV =

Indian television channel

Kalaignar
- Country: India
- Headquarters: Chennai, Tamil Nadu, India and Asia (except Malaysia)

Programming
- Picture format: 1080i HDTV (downscaled to 576i for the SDTV feed)

Ownership
- Owner: Kalaignar TV Private Limited
- Sister channels: Kalaignar Seithigal, Sirippoli, Murasu TV, Chithiram TV, Isaiaruvi

History
- Launched: 15 September 2007; 19 years ago

Kalaignar TV is an Indian Tamil-language general entertainment pay television channel based in Chennai, Tamil Nadu. The channel was launched on 15 September 2007 as Kalaignar, and is named after former Chief minister of Tamil Nadu M. Karunanidhi. Malaysia feed of Kalaignar ceased transmission on 1 June 2020.

In the past, the channel also used to be aired on Astro Channel 223 in the Chakravarthy package.

== History ==
The channel was launched by former Chief minister of Tamil Nadu M. Karunanidhi on 15 September 2007.

== Current broadcasts ==
Name	Premiere date
Vaa Thamizha Vaa	11 June 2023
Gowri	22 January 2024
Kaathu Vaakula Rendu Kaadhal	25 August 2025
Rudra	29 September 2025

The channel is re-telecasting seven serials Azhagi, Nadhaswaram, Ullam Kollai Poguthada, Ini Ellam Vasantham, Kolangal, Thendral and a cooking show Katrathu Samayal

== Former broadcasts ==
- Abirami
- Amudha Oru Aacharyakuri
- Bhavani
- Gokulathil Seethai
- Kannamma
- Kannedhirey Thondrinal
- Kurinji Malar
- Maanada Mayilada (Season 1–10)
- Madipakkam Madhavan
- Meenakshi Sundaram
- Mohini
- Naanal
- Paartha Gnabagam Illayo
- Pavithra
- Ponni C/O Rani
- Ramanujar
- Ranjithame
- Rekha IPS
- Samaikka Suvaikka
- Suryaputhri
- Thekkathi Ponnu
- Vaazhthu Kaatuvom
- Vilakku Vacha Nerathula
