= Raj TV =

Indian television channel

Raj TV ராஜ் TV
- Country: India
- Broadcast area: List: India, Sri Lanka, Singapore, Vietnam, Canada, Hong Kong, Europe, Mauritius, South Africa, Thailand.
- Headquarters: Chennai, Tamil Nadu, India

Programming
- Language: Tamil
- Picture format: 1080i (HDTV)

Ownership
- Sister channels: List: Raj TV US Raj Musix Raj Digital Plus Raj News 24X7 Vissa Raj digital Plus Raj News Raj Musix Telugu Raj News Kannada Raj Music Karnataka Raj Musix Malayalam TET

History
- Launched: 14 October 1994; 32 years ago

Links
- Website: RajTV.tv Raj Nexas

Raj TV is a Tamil language Indian general entertainment channel based in Chennai, India, which was launched on 14 October 1994. Rajtv became as the second most popular channel in Tamil.

It is available through digital and mobile entertainment platform, Raj Digital TV App.

The channel features a variety of soap operas, game shows, newscasts, films and shows of general entertainment. It airs serials such as Ganga Yamunaa, Mann Vasanai, Poovizhi Vasalile, Kanchana and Indira-Puthumai Penn. It airs Rajageetham (a reality show), Koppiyam (an anthology series), and Agada Vigadam (a debate show).

== Soaps ranking ==
Rank	Show	Status
1	Mann Vasanai	On-air
2	Poovizvhi Vasalile	On-air

== Films produced ==
- Chinna Chinna Kannile (2000)
- Athey Manithan (2000)
- Sigamani Ramamani (2001)
- Kadhalna Summa Illai (2009)
- Mariyadhai (2009)
- Magane En Marumagane (2010)

== International ==
Raj TV started broadcasting in the US as Raj TV US. Raj TV US is an American Category B specialty channel. It broadcasts programs from Raj TV as well as local American content.

Raj TV US was licensed by the ABC on 1 January 2014 as Tamil People's TV. It officially launched on 1 January 2014 as Raj TV US, via Cable One, DISH Network, Cablevision. Raj TV US was scheduled to be broadcast on the Comcast cable network.

Raj TV applied for TV broadcasting license in Sri Lanka and later dropped the idea, the license was then transferred to launch TV Derana in Sri Lanka.

== Partnership ==
Raj TV has joined a mutual partnership with Colors TV to dub its soap operas in Tamil. The agreement was signed in June 2015 at Chennai. Under the partnership serials of Colors such as Balika Vadhu, Udaan, Shastri Sisters, Thapki Pyaar Ki and Swaragini were dubbed in Tamil as Mann Vasanai, Poovizhi Vasalile, Kanchana, Indira and Ganga Yamunaa excluding the previously dubbed Colors serials like Alaipayuthey, Azhagiya Laila, Sindhu Bhairavi, Karuthamma, Gouravam, Jai Shri Krishna.

== See also ==
- List of television stations in India
