= Raj Television Network =

Indian satellite television network

Raj Television Network Limited
- Type: Public
- Traded as: BSE: 532826; NSE: RAJTV
- Industry: Mass media
- Founded: 14 October 1994
- Founders: Raajendhran, Ragunathan
- Headquarters: Chennai, Tamil Nadu, India
- Products: Broadcasting
- Operating income: 15 crore
- Net income: 35 crore
- Website: www.rajtvnet.in

Raj Television Network is an Indian satellite television network established on 3 June 1994 and is based in Chennai, India. It owns television channels across four South Indian languages Tamil, Telugu, Kannada and Malayalam. Its flagship channel is Raj TV.

== History ==
In 1983, four brothers established a video cassette lending company named Raj Video Vision. In 1984, the group started acquiring rights for Tamil films. In 1987, Rajendra an integrated studio was opened by Raj group and were used by independent movie and TV serial producers. The group used the studio to export 35 mm films and teleserials to Singapore, Malaysia, United Kingdom, UAE among others. Raj television network was established on 3 June 1994 with the launch of the Tamil channel Raj TV on 14 October 1994.

== Owned Channels ==
Channel	First aired	Language	Genre	SD/HD/4K
Raj TV	1994	Tamil	General Entertainment	SD+HD
Raj Digital Plus	1998	Tamil	Movies	SD
Raj Musix	2004	Tamil	Music	SD
Raj News	2004	Tamil	News	SD
Raj Nagaichuvai	2024	Tamil	Comedy	SD
Vissa TV	2003	Telugu	General Entertainment	SD
Raj News Telugu	2010	Telugu	News	SD
Raj Musix Telugu	2013	Telugu	Music	SD
Raj News Kannada	2000	Kannada	News	SD
Raj Musix Kannada	2009	Kannada	Music	SD
Raj Musix Malayalam	2018	Malayalam	Music	SD
Raj News Malayalam	2022	Malayalam	News	SD

Shut down channel

Channels	Language	Genre	Notes
Raj Pariwar	Hindi	General Entertainment Channel	25 December 2013
