= Mega TV (India) =

Indian Tamil-language television channel

Mega TV மெகா தொலைக்காட்சி
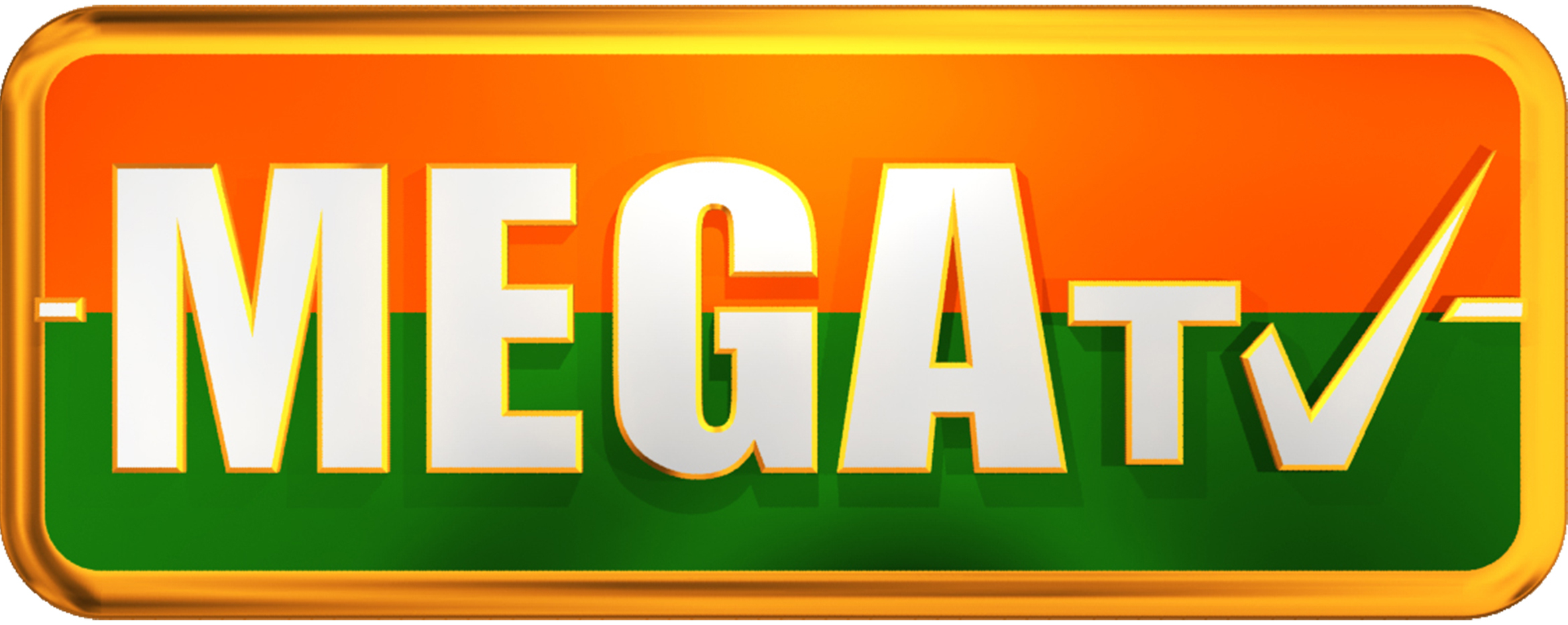
- Mega TV
- Headquarters: Chennai, Tamil Nadu, India

Programming
- Language: Tamil

Ownership
- Sister channels: Mega Musiq; Mega 24

History
- Launched: 19 November 2007

Mega TV (Tamil: மெகா டிவி) is a Tamil Language satellite television channel based in Chennai, India. It is the flagship channel of the Mega TV Network, launched on 19 November 2007. It is founded by Former Union minister of India K. V. Thangkabalu. The channel features a variety of infotainment shows, music programs, newscasts and classic films.

== History ==
Mega TV was launched by All India Congress Committee President Sonia Gandhi in New Delhi on 19 November 2007.

== List of films ==
- Neeyum Naanum (2010)
- Virunthali (2010)
- Sattam Oru Iruttarai (2012)
- Touring Talkies (2015)
- Thunai Mudhalvar (2015)
