= Global Tamil Vision =

European Tamil-language television channel

GTV
- Country: Australia (Head Office)
- Broadcast area: Europe, Australasia, Middle East, North Africa

Programming
- Language: Tamil

Ownership
- Owner: GTV - Synergy Media Group

History
- Launched: July 2008
- Closed: April 2, 2019
- Former names: Tharisanam TV (In Australia), Thendral TV (In Europe)

Global Tamil Vision (GTV) was a Tamil language digital satellite television channel. Its main audience are Sri Lankan Tamils living in Europe, Australia and the Middle East.

Tharisanam TV Australia was launched in January 2007 after the closure of Sigaram TV Australia in September 2006 due to Sigaram's bankruptcy. Tharisanam TV acquired the existing subscribers from Sigaram TV.

In May 2007 when the France-based pay TV, Tamil Television Network (TTN) was shut down, Tharisanam TV acquired the assets and subscribers of Tamil Television Network (TTN) and expanded its service to Europe. However Tharisanam TV Europe was not broadcasting the same programmes that were broadcast in Australia and New Zealand.

In Europe for a short period of time during mid-2008 Tharisanam TV's name was changed to Thendral TV due change of management. However, in Australia, the channel continued to operate as Tharisanam TV.

The channel changed its name to Global Tamil Vision in October 2008. The channel was available across Europe, Middle East and North Africa via Eutelsat's Hot Bird 8 satellite. The channel was available in Australia via Globecast TV. The channel was licensed to broadcast by Ofcom, the British TV regulator.

== Closure ==
The channel was dissolved via compulsory strike-off on 2 April 2019.
