= Makkal TV =

Indian Tamil-language TV channel

- Country: India
- Headquarters: Chennai, Tamil Nadu, India

Programming
- Language(s): Tamil

Ownership
- Owner: Makkal Tholai Thodarpu Kuzhumam Ltd

History
- Launched: 6 September 2006
- Closed: August 2016 (HyppTV); 1 April 2022 (Astro and NJOI)

Links
- Website: makkal.tv

Makkal TV is a Tamil language TV channel. It was launched on 6 September 2006 and is promoted by Makkal Tholai Thodarpu Kuzhumam. Pattali Makkal Katchi leader Ramadoss is the founder of TV and T.Bhuvaneswari is the Vice President and Administrator of the Channel.

== Programs ==
- Chinna Chinna Aasai
- Theethum Nandrum
- 7 Naal 7 Suvai
- Akkarai Seemai Aalayangal
- Kuttram
- Jannalukku Veliye
- Azhagiya Tamizh Magan/Magal
- Aadal Arasigalin Sangamam
- Kaalai Vanakkam
- Andam
- Rettai Vaal Kuruvi (Live Game Show)
- Achamillai
- Nam Nattu Samayail
- Malarum Bhoomi
- Uppum Orappum
- Pennay Unagaka
- Pattimandram
- Elakkiya pithan Pattimandram telecast in makkal TV in special function days

=== Dubbed Soap Operas ===
- Sayeera
- Neethane En Ponvasantham
- Neelambari
