= Parasakthi =

Parasakthi or Parashakti is a form of the Hindu goddess Shakti.

It may also refer to:

- Parashakthi Temple, Michigan, United States
- Parasakthi (1952 film), Indian film by Krishnan–Panju
- Parasakthi (2026 film), Indian film by Sudha Kongara
  - Parasakthi (soundtrack), soundtrack album by G. V. Prakash Kumar
- Adi Parasakthi, supreme Hindu goddess
  - Aathi Parasakthi, a 1971 Indian Tamil-language film based on the Hindu deity

== See also ==
- Shakti (disambiguation)
- Sakthi (disambiguation)
- Meendum Parasakthi, a 1985 Indian Tamil-language film
