= Kalyana Parisu (TV series) =

- Genre: Soap opera
- Written by: Vision Time Team; Dialogues by Joegeorge; P.A. Raghavan; P.R. Dhakshina Moorthy
- Screenplay by: Kumaresan
- Directed by: R.Nandhakumar (1-121); A.Ramachandran (RC) (122-200); A.P.Rajendhiran (201-1145); P.Selvam (1146-1634); Ponnai G.G.Madhan (1635-1716); Harish Adithya (1717- 1840)
- Creative director: R. Usha Kumar
- Starring: (Season- 1); Neha Gowda; Eshwar; Shruthi Shanmuga Priya; Sridevi Ashok (Season-2); Srithika Saneesh; Arnav; Keerthi Jai Dhanush; Kamal; Swathi Reddy
- Theme music composer: C. Sathya
- Opening theme: "Kalyana Parisu"; Rita (vocals); Vairamuthu (lyrics)
- Country of origin: India
- Original language: Tamil
- No. of seasons: 2
- No. of episodes: 1840

Production
- Producer: Vaidehi Ramamurthy
- Cinematography: S.Gunasekar; E.Manikandan; M.Raja Murugesan
- Editors: M.S.Thiyagarajan; Manikandan Ravi; M.N.Perumal; G.Pandi Durai; G. Sakthi Vel
- Camera setup: Multi-camera
- Running time: approx. 21-25 minutes per episode
- Production company: Vision Time India Pvt Ltd

Original release
- Network: Sun TV
- Release: 10 February 2014 – 27 March 2020

Kalyana Parisu (transl. Wedding gift) is a 2014 Indian Tamil-language soap opera that aired on Sun TV.The show was produced by Vision Time India Pvt Ltd and directed by Harish Adhitya. It premiered on 10 February 2014 and ended on 27 March 2020 for 1840 episodes.

The first season focused on Gayathri, Subbulakshmi and Surya, who were married. The second season premiered on 10 September 2018 and ended on 27 March 2020 for 1840 episodes. The second season sequel and next generation story of Kalyana Parisu 1 reflect the lives of Vidhya and Ashok (son of Gayathri).

== Series overview ==
Season	No. of episodes	Originally broadcast (India)	
Season	No. of episodes	Series premiere	Series finale
1	1381	10 February 2014	8 September 2018
2	459	10 September 2018	27 March 2020

== Plot ==
Season 1

This season is a family and triangular love story. Gayathri, Renuka and Subbulakshmi (Subbu) are good friends, but their friendship does not last long. Surya is married to both Subbulakshmi and Gayathri, due to unexpected circumstances. How life turns chaotic for all three is the story.

Season 2

This season is a village family romance revenge story. Vidya strives to take care of her family while working at Ashok's home. Though she is in love with her childhood friend Ashok, he does not understand Vidya and his stepmother Subbulakshmi 's feelings and wants to marry Shwetha (Keerthi Jai Dhanush) who falls in love with him. Later he marries Vidya due to unexpected circumstances. How Ashok and Vidhya live together is the story.

== Cast ==
=== Season 1 (2014–2018) ===
Main cast

- Neha Ramakrishna Gowda as Gayathri Surya (Surya's first wife)
- Sridevi Ashok as Subbulakshmi Surya (Surya's Second wife)
  - Shruthi Shanmuga Priya (2018) as Subbulakshmi (Replacement for Sridevi)
- Eshwar Ragunathan as Surya Dharmalingam (Gowtham's brother, Gayathri and Subbulakshmi's husband)
- M. Amulaya as Renuka Suresh (Gayathri and Subbulakshmi's friend)
  - Akila Prakash (2017–2018) as Renuka (Replacement for Amulaya)
- Master Bidami Shah as Ashok Surya (Gayathri's son) and Gowtham Surya (Subbulakshmi' son) (Dual Roles) (2017–2018)

Additional cast

- Sadhana as Gomathy Dharmalingam (Gowtham and Surya, Vanitha's mother;Died in serial)
- Andrews Jesudoss as Dharmalingam (Gowtham and Surya, Vanitha's father)
- Srividhya Nanjan as Vanitha Azhaguraja (Gowtham and Surya's sister)
- Guhan Shanmugam as Azhaguraja (Vanitha's husband)
- Gajesh as Dhandapany (Renuka's assistant)
- Ravi Varma as Suresh (Renuka's husband)
- Narasimha Raju as Annamalai (Gayathri's father)
- Bhavani / Dharini as Lakshmi Annamalai (Gayathri's mother)
- Gokul as Selvam (Subbu's elder brother)
- Sri Kala Parmasivam as Rani Selvam(Selvam's wife)
- Sudha as Suresh's mother
- Anuradha as Rajalakshmi (Prasad's aunt)
- Sathyapriya as Thirupurasundari Rajamanickam (Dharmalingam's sister, Mallika's mother)
- Bombay Babu as Rajamanickam (Thirupurasundari's husband, Mallika's father)

Former cast

- Arun Kumar Rajan as Gowtham Dharmalingam (Surya's brother;died in serial)
- Sai Swetha as Vaishali
- Thalaivasal Vijay as Ramana
- Avinash Yelandur as Gurukkal (Temple priest, died in the serial)
- Lakshmi Narayanan as Gowri
- Krish as Rajadurai (Vaishali's husband, died in the serial)
- Krithika as Sandhya (died in the serial)
- Sreeja as Anbarasi Prasad
- Pollachi Babu as Anbarasi's brother
- Sangeetha Shetty as Tara
- Manush Manhmohan as Prasad
- Jayalakshmi as Angala Parameshwari
- --- as Vasanth (Anbarasi's former lover, died in the serial)
- Vibhu Raman as Vijay (Renuka's former lover, died in the serial)
- Rindhya as Durga (Mutaiyah's Wife)
- VC Jeyamani as Rangarajan, Mutaiyah's father (died in the serial)
- Srilatha as Paravathi Rangarajan(Muthaiyah's mother)
- Deepa Nethran as Sathish's mother
- Sunitha as Abhinaya (Abhi), Muthiya's sister
- Kalaranjini as Gajalakshmi
- A. Sakunthala as Parasakthi
- Nalini as Hostel Warden

=== Season 2 (2018–2020) ===
Main cast

- Srithika Saneesh as Vidhya Ashok (Arjun and Lakshmi's first daughter)
- Arnav as Ashok Surya (Surya and Gayathri's son) and Gowtham Surya @ Rocky (Surya and Subbulaksmi's son)
  - Master Bidami Shah as child Ashok & child Gowtham
- Keerthi Jai Dhanush as Swetha Arjun (Arjun and Shyamala Devi's daughter)

Recurring Cast

- Swathi Reddy as Kalyani Vetrimaran (Vidhya's sister, Arjun and Lakshmi's middle daughter)
- Pandi Kamal as Vetrimaran Ramanathan (Kalyani's husband, Vishalakshi and Ramanathan's son)
- R.Poongkodi as Dharani Azhaguraja (Vanitha and Azhaguraja's daughter)
- Sumangali as Vishalakshi Ramanathan (Vetrimaran's mother)
- as Mani (Vishalakshi's elder brother, Vetrimaran's uncle)
- Shanthi as Lakshmi Arjun (Vidhya's, Kalyani's & Vasuki's mother)
- Sathish as Arjun (Vidya, Vasuki, Kalyani and Swetha's father, Lakshmi and Shyamala's husband)
- Shilpa as Shyamala Devi Arjun (Swetha's mother)
- Nivedhitha Pankaj as Vasuki (Vidhya's younger sister, Arjun and Lakshmi's youngest daughter)
- Sai Gopi as Sundaram (Lakshmi's brother; Saravanan's father)
- "Bhandham" Saval Ram as Suruli (Sundaram's assistant)
- Suruli as Swami (Shyamala's assistant)
- "Ahalya Mali" as Nathuram Settu (Poonam and Malini's father)
- Karthick as Saravanan Sundaram (Geetha's husband, Sundaram and Karpagam's son)
- Asritha Kingini as Geetha Saravanan (Saravanan's wife, Mallika and Ramachandran's daughter)
- Chandrasekharan as Naidu (Rocky's adoptive uncle)
- Karthick Raj as Mugundhan

Former cast

- Neha Gowda as Thayamma @ Gayathri Surya (Surya's first wife, Ashok's mother) (Replaced by Gayathri Devi)
- Shruthi Shanmugam Priya as Subbulakshmi Surya (Surya's second wife, Ashok's step-mother and Gautham's mother) (Replaced by Vanitha Krishnachandran)
- Eshwar Raghunathan as Surya Dharmalingam (Gayathri and Subbulakshmi's husband, Ashok and Gautham's father, Died in serial)
- Shari as Gomathy Dharmalingam (Surya's mother, Ashok and Gautham's grandmother, Died in serial)
- R.Poongkodi as Vanitha Azhaguraja (Surya's sister, Dharani's mother Died in serial)
- Guhan Shanmugam as Azhaguraja (Dharani's father)
- Saithra Gruthika as Kalyani (Vidhya's sister) (Replaced by Swathi Reddy)
- --- as Valli (Swetha's spy)
- ---- as Poonam (died in serial)
- ---- as Vimal (Poonam's fiancé)
- Sathyapriya as Thirupurasundari Rajamanickam (Dharmalingam's sister and Mallika's mother)
- Ranjini Pradeep as Malini (Poonam's elder sister, Died in serial)
- C. Ranganathan as Ramanathan (Vetrimaran's father, Died in serial)
- Gayathri Devi as Gayathri Surya @Thayamma (Surya's 1st wife, Ashok's mother and Gautham's step mother)
- Vanitha Krishnachandran as Subbulaksmi Surya (Surya's 2nd wife, Gautham's mother And Ashok's step mother)
- Androos Jesudas as Dharmalingam (Surya's father, Ashok and Gautham's grandfather)
- Ravikanth as Dhandapaany (Thayamma's assistant)
- Vinod as Ranjith (Geetha's Ex fiancée)
- Issac Varkees as Ramachandran (Mallika's husband, Geetha's father)
- Mona Bedre as Mallika Ramachandran (Thirupurasundari and Rajamanickam's daughter)
- Priya as Karpagam Sundaram (Saravanan's mother)
- Kavya Varshini as Valli (Saravanan's elder sister)
- Birla Bose as Valli's husband

== Casting ==
Season 1

Season 1 is a family story produced by Vision Time Pvt Ltd which airs on Sun TV. Kannada TV actress Neha Gowda was selected to portray the lead role of Gayathri. Sridevi was chosen after her great performances in many shows on Tamil television. Later Sruthi Shanmuga Priya replaced the role of Subbulakshmi in Episode 1080. Amulaya makes her debut in Tamil serials as Renukha. Later Akila replaced the role of Renukha in Episode 440. Eshwar was selected to portray the lead role of Surya. Sreeja of Bommalattam serial fame was selected to portray the main role of Anbarasi in Episode 1198. Other supporting cast members include Sadhana, Narasimha Raju, Anuradha, Sudha, Kalaranjini and Bhavani.

Season 2

Season 2 is a village family romance revenge story. Srithika Saneesh was selected to portray the new lead role of Vidhya, who is known for the serials Nadhaswaram and Kula Deivam. Arnav was chosen due to his performance in Sakthi and Keladi Kanmani. Other supporting cast members include Vanitha Krishnachandran, Shanthi, Sathyapriya, Androos Jesudas, Birla Bose and C. Ranganathan.

== Production ==
The series was directed by R.Nandhakumar, A.Ramachandran, A.P.Rajendhiran, P.Selvam and Ponnai G.G.Madhan. It was produced by Vision Time, along with the production crew of 2007–2019.

- Editors: M.S.Thiyagarajan, Manikandan Ravi, M.N.Perumal, G. Sakthi Vel
- Cinematography: S.Gunasekar, E.Manikandan, M.Raja
- Producer: Vaidehi Ramamurthy
- Dialogues: Joegeorge, Pa.Raghavan, P.R.Dhakshina Moorthy

== Soundtrack ==
The title song was written by lyricist Vairamuthu, composed C. Sathya and sung by Rita. The song was released on 10 February 2014 on Sun TV and on Vision Time's official YouTube channel on 8 August 2014.

Track list
No.	Title	Lyrics	Music	Singer(s)	Length
1.	"Kalyana Parisu (கல்யாண பரிசு) Title Song"	Vairamuthu	C. Sathya	Rita	3:20
2.	"Nattu Vassa Poo Sediyai (நட்டு வச்ச பூ செடியை)"				1:20
3.	"Ivan Thana (இவன் தானா)"				3:50
