= Four Samosas =

2022 film

- Directed by: Ravi Kapoor
- Written by: Ravi Kapoor
- Produced by: Ravi Kapoor, Rajiv Maikhuri, Venk Portula, Craig Stovel
- Cinematography: Aakash Raj
- Edited by: Anisha Acharya
- Music by: Sagar Desai
- Production companies: Marginal Mediaworks, Junglee Films, Creative Rebel Productions, Khrisp Entertainment
- Distributed by: IFC Films
- Release date: 2 December 2022
- Running time: 80 minutes
- Language: English

Four Samosas is a 2022 English language action comedy and romance film set in Artesia, California. It was written and directed by Ravi Kapoor. The film’s cast includes Venk Potula, Sonal Shah, Sharmita Bhattacharya, Nirvan Patnaik, Karan Soni, Summer Bishil, and Meera Simhan.

The film was premiered at the 2022 Tribeca Festival and was theatrically released on 2 December 2022.

== Plot ==
The movie opens with four disguised thieves running out of a store: Juneja's Cash & Carry. Yellow text displays on the screen "Four Samosas....and the ill-advised grocery store heist." Then it cuts to "a few days earlier", where Vinny (Venk Potula) is working with customers in a Sari store, and sharing his rhymes with his coworker.

Vinny, Anjali (Sharmita Bhattacharya), and Zak (Nirvana Patnaik) meet at the Chaat House, where Zak works. Zak shares the news that Rina (Summer Bishil), Vinny's ex-girlfriend is now engaged. Then Vinny finds out that it's Sanjay (Karan Soni), the goat-dung-repurposer, is Rina's husband-to-be. Vinny confronts Rina in her salon before storming out.

Vinny's cousin, Nikki (Maya Kapoor), is preparing a performance for the Little India Cultural Night, and asks Vinny for advice. After their chat, Vinny decides he needs to "get a life." Vinny explains his plan to Zak: steal from Rina's wealthy father in order to "reappropriate the wealth." This would allow him to send money to his ailing aunties, and Zak could go live his dreams as an actor in Bollywood. Anjali overhears and joins the plan as a chance to hangout with her crush, Zak.

The diamonds are in a safe in Mr. Juneja's office in the Cash and Carry. Anjali does reconnaissance by tricking Mr. Juneja (Tony Mirrcandani) into an interview for her newspaper. Meanwhile, Zak puts on a song and dance show by the checkouts. With Mr. Juneja distracted, Anjali is left alone in the office with the safe.

They seek the help of Paru (Sinai Shah), a former engineer who studied at IIT, for her help cracking the safe's combination lock. In order to borrow tools, the crew enters into a series of contests with local activists including a dance off, Ladoo eating contest, oral arguments, and rap battle. They get the tools and agree to steal the diamonds the following day. Vinny seeks a blessing from his father (Ravi Kapoor), a priest, in advance of the heist, hoping to be told not to do it.

Once in disguise, Vinny, Paru, Anjali, and Zak enter the Cash & Carry before it closes and hide until they are locked in. The four spend hours trying to open the safe with various tools but with no luck. Then Vinny tries Rina's birthday as the combination, and it opens. They make it out of the store with diamonds and celebrate at Vinny's.

Rina stops by the Sari shop and accuses Vinny of stealing the diamonds. The crew decides they could sell the diamonds back to Mr. Juneja, since they are illegal and won't be able to call the police about their theft. They call the store and arrange a meetup, asking for $40,000.

Anjali, dressed as an old man, goes to exchange with Mr. Juneja on the baseball field. Chaos ensues as they discover he brought fake cash, and Vinny didn't even bring the real diamonds. Zak is taken away by Mr. Juneja, future son-in-law Sanjay, and Sanjay's henchman Billu (Havish Ravipati) and questioned in the grocery store.

The four go back to Vinny's to get the diamonds and return them to Mr. Juneja but Vinny's mom, Kamala, has used them for making King Ashoka’s prop crown sparkly. They find the performers in the park, and Sanjay steals the crown back, returning it to Mr. Juneja.

The four realize they don't need the money they would've gotten from selling the diamonds, and Vinny bursts out that the heist was really always about Rina.

Vinny decides to help his cousin Nikki with her Little India cultural show performance, and the two audition with a duet. He also assembles a crew (the four) for his own performance. Vinny performs a song dedicated to Rina, seeking to win her back. She doesn't respond initially, but then compliments him afterwards and invites Vinny to her shop for a free eyebrow threading.

The crew all heads to the Chaat House.

== Cast ==
- Aly Mawji as Deep
- Ajit Mehta as Debating revolutionary
- Havish Ravipati as Billu
- Kamal Khan as Jogger
- Karan Soni as Sanjay
- Maya Kapoor as Nikki
- Meera Simhan as Kamala
- Nirvan Patnaik as Zak
- Poonam Basu as Pushpa
- Ravi Kapoor as Priest
- Samrat Chakrabarti as Sunny/Salim
- Sharmita Bhattacharya as Anjali
- Sharayu Mahale as Dancing revolutionary
- Shivani Thakkar as Sheila
- Sonal Shah as Paru
- Sujata Day as Preeti
- Summer Bishil as Rina
- Venk Potula as Vinny

== Critical reception ==
Beatrice Loayza for The New York Times stated "“Four Samosas” is all about the team’s goofs." Noel Murray of Los Angeles Times opined "... the film hits its stride about halfway through its running time before sputtering down the stretch." Lena Wilson of TheWrap found cinematography issues and wrote in her review "In one sequence, the gang swaggers down a street in slow motion. When a full-speed passerby reveals they’ve just been walking extremely slowly, they snap out of it and start moving normally. This is the nonverbal equivalent of explaining a joke." Daniel Kirkham of SLUG Magazine felt "messy script" and wrote that "It’s a messy script, at times both over-written and under-considered, and it could have done with a revision or two to balance out those tendencies."
