= Thomas Donnelly =

Thomas Donnelly may refer to:

- Thomas Donnelly (Saskatchewan politician) (Thomas F. Donnelly, 1874–1948), Canadian member of Parliament
- Thomas Donnelly (sergeant-at-arms) (1764–1835), New York legislative officer
- Thomas Donnelly (Alberta politician) (1933–1997), Alberta MLA
- Thomas Dean Donnelly, American screenwriter
- Thomas F. Donnelly (New York City) (1863–1924), New York politician and judge
- Thomas Wallace Donnelly (1932–2025), American entomologist
- Tom Donnelly (rugby union) (Thomas Mathew Donnelly, born 1981), New Zealand rugby union player
- Tommy Donnelly (footballer), Irish association football player
- Tom Donnelly (Scottish footballer) (born 1947),
- Tom Donnelly (Australian footballer), Australian rule footballer
- Tom Donnelly (runner), winner of the 1968 distance medley relay at the NCAA Division I Indoor Track and Field Championships

== See also ==
- Tommy Donnelly, a character from the NBC series The Black Donnellys
- Giselle Donnelly (born Thomas Donnelly, 1953), American writer and director of the Center for Defense Studies at the American Enterprise Institute
