= Black Dutch =

Black Dutch may refer to:

- Black Dutch (genealogy)
- Afro-Dutch people
