= Arnav Amjath =

Indian model and Tamil-language actor

Arnav
- Born: Amjath Khan; 26 April 1989 (age 37); Aranthangi, Pudukottai, Tamil Nadu, India
- Occupation: Actor
- Years active: 2014-2020; 2022-present

Arnav (born as Amjath Khan; 26 April 1989) is an Indian television actor. He made his debut in serials with Sakthi. He is known for his anti-hero role as Arya in that serial. He later acted in the serial Keladi Kanmani in which his role as Yugendran, a caring husband, was well received. He also participated in Bigg Boss 8.

== Television ==
Year	Show	Role	Channel	Notes
2014–2015	Sakthi	Arya	Sun TV	Anti-Hero Role
2015–2017	Keladi Kanmani	Yugendran "Yugi"/Vijayan "Vijay"/Aryagan/Jeeva	Sun TV	Main Lead
2015–2016	Priyasakhi	Anbazhagan "Anbu"	Zee Tamizh	Main Lead
2018–2020	Kalyana Parisu 2	Ashok/Gautham (Rocky)	Sun TV	Main Lead
2019	Azhagu	Ashok	Sun TV	Special Appearance
2022–2024	Chellamma	Siddharth	Star Vijay	Lead
2024	Bigg Boss 8	Contestant	Star Vijay	Evicted Day 14
2024	Veera	Saravana velu	Zee Tamil	Special Appearance

=== Web series ===
Year	Show	Role	Platform	Notes
2020	Singa Penne	Arjun	ZEE5	

== Awards and honours ==
Year	Serial	Role	Award	Category	Result	Notes
2015	Sakthi	Arya	Serial Awards	Best Actor	Won	
2015	Sakthi	Arya	University of Swahili	Honorary Doctorate	Won	
2017	Keladi Kanmani	Yugendran; Vijayan; Jeeva; Aryagan	Vels Nakshatra	Best Actor	Won	
2019	Kalayana Parisu	Ashok; Gautham (Rocky)	Sun Kudumbam Viruthugal	Azhagiya Nayagan	Won	
2019	Kalyana Parisu 2	Ashok; Gautham (Rocky)	Sun Kudumbam Viruthugal	Best Actor	Nominated	
2019	Kalyana Parisu 2	Ashok; Gautham	Sun Kudumbam Viruthugal	Best Pair	Nominated	Nominated with Srithika
