= Sonal Shah =

Sonal Shah may refer to:

- Sonal Shah (actress) Indian-American actress
- Sonal Shah (economist) (born 1968), Indian-American economist
- Sonal Shah, wife of Indian home minister Amit Shah
