= Ratko: The Dictator's Son =

- Directed by: Savage Steve Holland
- Written by: Robert Mittenthal; Michael Rubiner
- Produced by: Barry Layne; Paul Hertzberg
- Starring: Efren Ramirez; Adam West; Katrina Bowden
- Cinematography: William D. Barber
- Edited by: Sherwood Jones; Justin Kanew; Cindy Parisott
- Music by: Amjad Albasel
- Production companies: CineTel Films; Intermedia; National Lampoon Productions; National Lampoon Inc. Ratko BC Productions
- Distributed by: National Lampoon Inc.
- Release date: April 6, 2010
- Country: United States
- Language: English

National Lampoon's Ratko: The Dictator's Son is a 2010 American teen comedy film directed by Savage Steve Holland. The film was produced by Intermedia Films and Cinetel Films and was distributed by National Lampoon Inc. It was filmed in Vancouver, British Columbia.

The film was released direct to DVD on April 6, 2010.

== Plot ==
Ratko Volvic (Efren Ramirez), the son of an affluent Eastern European dictator (Adam West), enrolls for the freshman semester at an American university. His exotic accent and hedonistic lifestyle soon establish him as the most colorful character on campus. But when Ratko falls hard for student activist Holly (Katrina Bowden), he begins to question his father's true character and where all his wealth actually came from.

== Cast ==
- Efren Ramirez as Ratko Volvic
- Adam West as Kostka Volvic
- Katrina Bowden as Holly
- Ildiko Ferenczi as Shota Volvic
- Lucia Oskerova as Teuta Volvic
- Blake Anderson as Derek
- Curtis Armstrong as Dushkan
- Jeffrey Ballard as Jeremy
- Tyler Boissonnault as Jason
- Christine Danielle as Christine Connolly
- Rob deLeeuw as B.J. Biff
- John DeSantis as Skender
- Adam Devine as Chris
- Dennis Haskins as Dean Sitlong
- Emily Ingersoll as Natalie
- Victor Cohn-Lopez as Victor
- Haley Mancini as Sydnie
- Brandon Jay McLaren as Juwaan
- Sonal Shah as Layla
- Daniel-Ryan Spaulding as Evan
- Marika Taylor as Jasmine
- Yee Jee Tso as Nick
- Jay Brazeau as Professor Grubbspeck
- Olivia O'Lovely as Maid #1
