= Manesha Chatarji =

Indian actress (born 1990)

- Born: 29 Aug 1990 (age 36); Kolkata, India
- Education: Mithibai College
- Occupations: Actress, model, producer
- Years active: 2007–present

Manesha Chatarji is an Indian actress known for her roles in Hindi, Telugu, Tamil, and Odia TV shows and films.

She made her Hindi debut from the film "World Cupp 2011" (2009) in the lead role. She then appeared in the second highest-grossing film of the year "Wanted" (2009) as a commissioner's daughter.

She has worked predominantly in the Tamil movie industry. Manesha has appeared in popular movies including World Cupp 2011 and Thambivudaiyaan.

She has appeared in Sita Rama Nka Bahaghara Kali Jugare (Odia; 2017) and Sitaramula Kalyanam Chuthamu Raarandi (Telugu; 2017).

== Early life ==
Manesha Chatarji was born on August 30, 1988, in Kolkata (formerly Calcutta), India. She went to school in Mumbai, graduating from Mithibai College, where she pursued a fashion design course. She has 1,600 followers on Instagram.

== Career ==
Manesha Chatarji is best known for her role in the Bollywood movie Wanted, in which she starred as the General's daughter alongside Salman Khan. She has also appeared in several television commercials and magazine ads.

In 2009, Manesha appeared in Thambivudayaan, along with Aditya Anbu, Nizhalgal Ravi, Charu Haasan, and Kadhal Dhandapani. The film was directed by Raja Mahesh.

That same year, Manesha starred in her first Hindi movie, World Cupp 2011, a Bollywood sport and crime film directed by debutante director Ravi Kapoor. Ravi Kapoor and Manesha Chatarji were chosen for the leading roles. After a one year break, Manesha joined the cast of Sakthi, a Tamil soap opera broadcast on Sun TV. This serial was an adaptation of a Hindi serial named Dil Se Di Dua... Saubhagyavati Bhava?. The show ran from June 2014 to March 2015 with a total of 205 episodes.

In 2015, Manesha Chatarji was cast in two movies, the Telugu film Udyanavanam 2 and the Tamil film, Tea Kadai Bench. In 2016, she signed on for two more Telugu movies, Anthuleni Prema and Sita Rama nka Bahaghara Kali Jugare (Odia). In 2017, her first Odia movie, Sita Rama nka Bahaghara Kali Jugare, was released; Chatarji played the lead role with co-star Sabyasachi Mishra.

The Telugu version of Sitaramula Kalyanam Chuthamu Raarandi is currently in post-production. In 2018, Manesha became the co-producer on India's first teen fantasy movie, 1978 A Teen Night Out. The most recent movie in which Manisha Chatarji has acted is Sita Rama Nka Bahaghara Kali Jugar.
