= Black Irish (folklore) =

Mythical ethnic identity

In the United States, the term "Black Irish" was initially used in the 19th century to derogatorily describe Irish refugees of the Great Famine. It later shifted into a term used to describe people of Irish descent who have black or dark brown hair and olive skin. This meaning is not commonly used in Ireland, where "Black Irish" more refers to Irish people of sub-Saharan African descent.

The most common use of the term "Black Irish" is tied to the myth that they were descended from Spanish sailors shipwrecked during the Spanish Armada of 1588. However, no anthropological, historical, or genetic research supports this story. Some theorists assert that the term was adopted in some cases by Irish Americans who wanted to conceal interracial unions with African Americans, paralleling the phrase "Black Dutch" which was also used in the United States to hide racial identity. Likewise, the concept of "Black Irish" was also used by some Aboriginal Australians and Torres Strait Islanders to racially pass themselves into Anglo-Celtic Australian society. In the earlier parts of the 19th century, "Black Irish" was sometimes used in the United States to describe biracial people of African and Irish descent.

By the 20th century, "Black Irish" had become an identity played out by Irish-American authors such as Robert E. Howard. In 21st-century Ireland Black Irish is used primarily to refer to Irish nationals of African descent, and the alternative meaning is not commonly used.

== Origins of the term ==
Researching in 2022, Professor Mary M. Burke of University of Connecticut found that the term "Black Irish" emerged in the United States as early as the 1830s, although was popularised in the 1840s following the Great Famine. In this first iteration, "Black Irish" referred to post-famine Irish immigrants who were considered inferior, uncivilised and willing to intermingle with African-Americans, unlike the pre-famine Irish-Americans, who were more racially aligned with Anglo-Americans. "Black Irish" was a term used to block the post-famine Irish from acceptance into white American society.

By the early 20th century, the term "Black Irish" became less racial and more romantic in meaning. The academic Christopher Dowd describes the Black Irish identity as being "performed" by early 20th-century Irish-American authors such as F. Scott Fitzgerald, James T. Farrell, Margaret Mitchell, and Robert E. Howard. These authors "became Irish in the same way that all Irish Americans do—by ascribing certain traits to an imagined Irish community", popularising, exploring, and expanding upon the myth of the 'Black Irish' in their writings. The authors altered the term "Black Irish" from implying the Irish were less than white to an ethnic term that suggested parts of the Irish population, marked by black hair, were more markedly brooding and depressed.

== Spanish Armada origin myth ==
The primary origin myth of the Black Irish proposes that a strain of Irish people with black hair and dark complexions were the descendants of Spanish sailors shipwrecked during the Spanish Armada of 1588. In reality, of the roughly 5,000 Spanish sailors who were recorded as being wrecked off the coast of Ireland and Scotland, the few that survived the wrecks were either murdered by local Irish people, handed over to English troops to be executed or immediately returned to Spain, and thus could not have impacted the Irish gene pool in any significant manner.

In 1912, Irish author James Joyce asserted a different version of the myth, suggesting in an article that the residents of Galway were of "the true Spanish type" owing to their interaction and trade with the Spanish in the medieval era.

== Genetic studies ==
Two genetic studies conducted in the 2010s found little if any Spanish traces in Irish DNA, with population geneticist Dan Bradley of Trinity College Dublin rejecting the Spanish origin myth.

== Use of the term by interracial descendants ==
Some researchers have suggested the term "Black Irish" was also used in the 19th and 20th centuries by Irish Americans in the United States who wanted to conceal interracial children produced with African Americans. Academics researching the multi-racial Melungeon ethnic identity and other Native American groups in the southern United States found that "Black Irish" and "Black Dutch" were amongst a dozen myths about "dark" European ancestors used to disguise the African heritage of interracial children. A primary source told researchers, "They would say they were "Black Dutch" or "Black Irish" or "Black French", or Native American. They’d say they were anything but Melungeon because anything else would be better ... because to be Melungeon was to be discriminated against."

In 1932 Irish priest John J. Williams wrote "Whence came the Black Irish of Jamaica?", in which he applied the term "Black Irish" to interracial Afro-Irish Caribbean people on islands such as Jamaica and Montserrat. Williams suggested that Black Caribbeans with Irish surnames were the result of intermarriage. Contemporaries of Williams uncomfortable with the idea of interracial communities countered that the Irish surnames were the result of slaves adopting the surnames of their masters. Modern researchers believe both theories can be simultaneously accurate.

In the early to mid-20th century, the myth of the 'Black Irish' was used occasionally by Aboriginal Australians to racially pass themselves into white Australian society.

== Modern use of the term ==
In the 1950s, Malcolm X of the Nation of Islam would occasionally assert, alongside claiming Italians were descended from Carthaginian Africans and the Spanish were descended from the Moors, that the Irish were also of Black descent by invoking the 'Black Irish' myth in conjunction with the Spanish-Moors argument.

The term remains an ethnonym within Irish America, where it is frequently invoked within Irish American crime fiction and neo-noir television such as The Black Donnellys to develop a thematic foreboding overtone, often in discussion with Irish American anxieties of ethnic obsolescence. The Black Donnellys jests at the terms mythic origins by claiming that the Spanish Armada myth covers a deeper myth about a pre-Celtic race of dark skinned people that the Celts intermarried with.

In 21st-century Ireland, Black Irish is now more commonly used to refer to Irish nationals of African descent. According to the 2022 census, 67,546 people identify as Black or Black Irish with an African background, while 8,699 people identify as Black or Black Irish with any other Black background.

In 21st-century America, Burke suggests the term "Black Irish" has been used in America to stress the idea that Irish people (and therefore Irish-Americans) are exclusively white. By stressing the idea that "Black Irish" can only refer to white Irish people with black hair, Irish people of Black racial origins are marginalised.

== Within the Irish language ==
The Irish language uses the word gorm (literally "blue") to describe those with melanated skin. The more modern insertion of duine de dhath or person of color into the Irish language vocabulary was created due to associations between dubh (literally "black") and the devil and confusion about describing people of colour as "blue" in a bilingual society.
