= Sakthi =

Sakthi may refer to:

- Sakthi (1972 film), a Malayalam film by Crossbelt Mani
- Sakthi (1980 film), a Malayalam film by Vijay Anand
- Sakthi (1997 film), a Tamil film
- Sakthi (2011 film), a Telugu film
- Sakthi (TV series), an Indian Tamil soap opera
- Sakthi Group, an Indian conglomerate company
- R. C. Sakthi (1940-2015), Indian filmmaker and actor

== See also ==
- Shakti (disambiguation)
