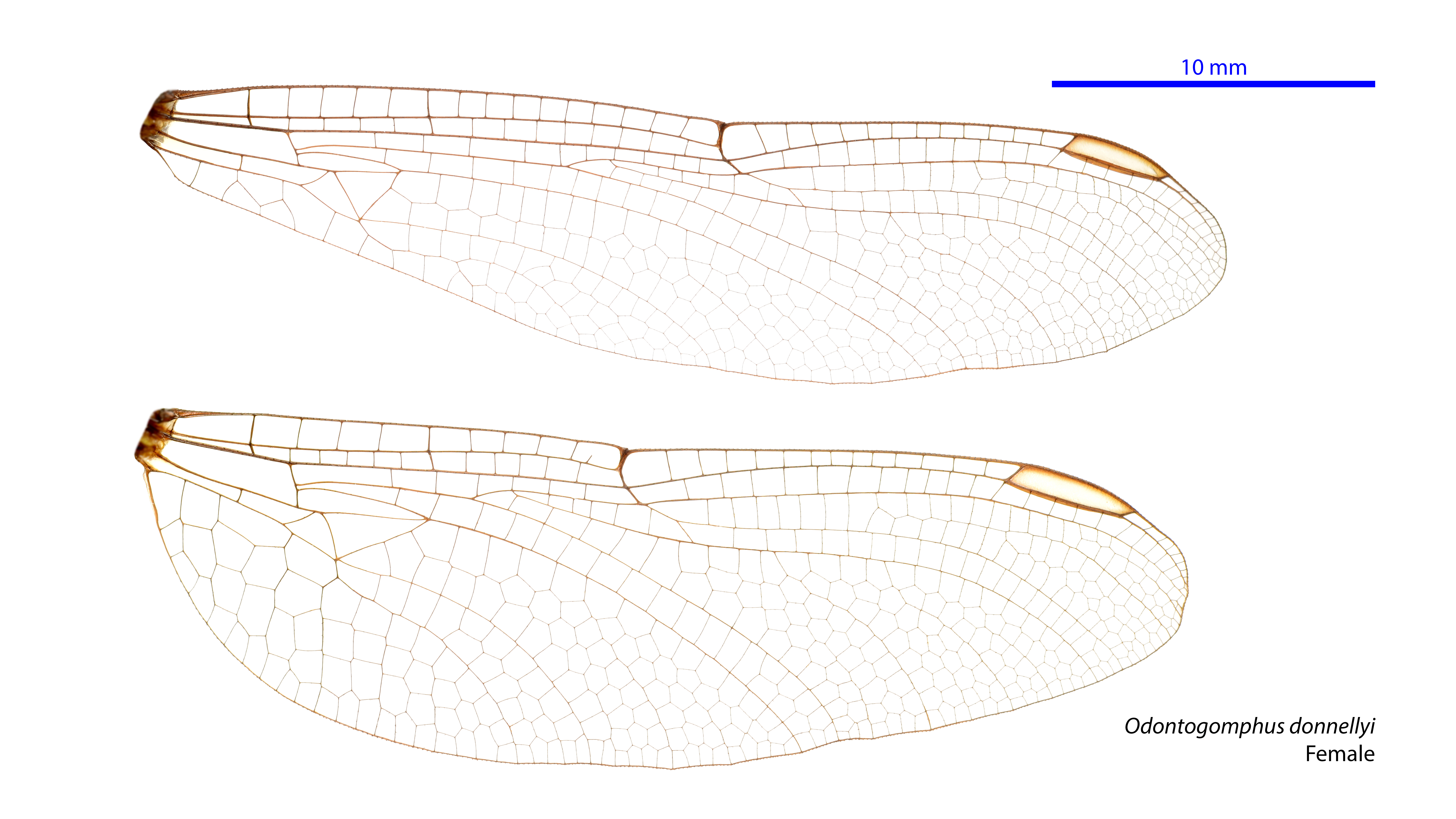
- Wings of a female Pinchtail, Odontogomphus donnellyi

Scientific classification
- Kingdom: Animalia
- Phylum: Arthropoda
- Clade: Pancrustacea
- Class: Insecta
- Order: Odonata
- Suborder: Anisoptera
- Family: Gomphidae
- Genus: Odontogomphus; Watson, 1991

= Odontogomphus =

Genus of dragonflies

Odontogomphus is a genus of dragonflies in the family Gomphidae, endemic to north-eastern Queensland, Australia. The single known species is a medium-sized and slender dragonfly, with black and greenish-yellow markings.

== Species ==
The genus includes only one species:

- Odontogomphus donnellyi Watson, 1991 - Pinchtail

== Etymology ==
The genus name Odontogomphus is derived from the Greek ὀδών (odōn, "tooth"), combined with Gomphus, a genus name derived from the Greek γόμφος (gomphos, "peg" or "nail"). The name refers to tooth-like projections near the tip of the abdomen.

== See also ==
- List of Odonata species of Australia
