= World Cupp 2011 =

- Directed by: Ravi Kapoor
- Produced by: S.A GEMS PVT. LTD
- Starring: Ravi Kapoor; Prem Chopra; Manesha Chatarji
- Release date: 18 December 2009
- Country: India
- Language: Hindi

World Cupp 2011 is a 2009 Indian Hindi-language sports crime film directed by debutante Ravi Kapoor. Starring Ravi Kapoor, Prem Chopra and Manesha Chatarji in the lead roles, the film deals with match fixings and involvement of the Underworld. The film was released theatrically on 18 December 2009.

== Plot ==
The backdrop of the film is sports. The film deals with the game of Cricket. Antagonism for World Cup 2011, the Indian team is going on and teams from different countries are participating. One of the very strong players Ravi Indulkar from India.

In the end of the last decade of the 20th century, a slow but sure dispute between gangsters created roughness in the underworld. Some very high-profile people and businessman were extorted, but the media covered this news extensively and the government took a strict action against the underworld.

And the braking impact was created when home minister R.R. Patil completely banned the dance bars in Mumbai.

In such conditions when circumstances were not so good. Then underworld centralized attention on sports as a source of making money, and they aimed the most glamorous game "Cricket". Ravi Kapoor is playing the main lead, as Caption Ravi Indulkar of the Indian Cricket team. His four friends Rajpal, Hiten, Irfan and Balwinder, they fix a World Cupp match held in 2007 against Pakistan with a bookie- Shobhan. And then the twist as always they are exposed by press reporter Balakrishnan. BICI bans the caption Ravi Indulkar and his four teammates for four years. Ravi's girlfriend Soha also leaves him because of his deeds and in the meantime Ravi also loses his dad.

The coach once again gives chance to Ravi and his four teammates after proving their patriotism to play World Cupp 2011. Once again India faces its arch rivals Pakistan in final. Everyone has a doubt in their mind and as we know history repeat itself, king of bookies Shobhan once again tries to fix the match with the help of Ravi. This time Ravi refuses his offer, in retaliation he kidnaps Ravi's girlfriend Soha who is Physiotherapist of Indian cricket team. As soon as Ravi learns of Soha's kidnapping he informs the Home minister who then puts an encounter specialist on this job. The encounter specialist rescues Soha at the risk of his life. On the other hand, Ravi is struggling to win World Cupp 2011.

== Cast ==
- Ravi Kapoor - Ravi
- Puneet Vasishtha - Special appearance
- Manesha Chatarji - Soha
- Zakir Hussain - Bookie Shobhaan
- Smita Jaykar - Ravi's mother
- Suresh Oberoi - Coach
- Prem Chopra - BICI Chairman
- Aadesh Shrivastav - Guest appearance

== Soundtrack ==
The music was composed by Aadesh Shrivastava and released by Saregama. All lyrics were written by Sameer.

World Cupp 2011

Soundtrack album by Aadesh Shrivastava
- Released: 31 Dec 2009
- Recorded: 2009
- Genre: Soundtrack
- Length: 42:41
- Label: Saregama
- Producer: Aadesh Shrivastava

Aadesh Shrivastava chronology
Love Kaa Taddka (2009)	World Cupp 2011 (2009)	Raajneeti (2010)

Track list
No.	Title	Singer(s)	Length
1.	"My Heart Says To Me"	Aadesh Shrivastava	6:06
2.	"Cheers Bol"	Aadesh Shrivastava	3:50
3.	"Forever"	Vijayta Pandit, Shaan	6:05
4.	"Suruma Mohabatwala"	Aasma	4:42
5.	"Kahan Ho Bhaiya"	Shankar Mahadevan	6:32
6.	"Lets Rock India"	Shaan, Aadesh Shrivastava	4:52
7.	"Bindaas Bala"	Shraddha Pandit, Bob	4:27
8.	"My Heart Says To Me (Version 2)"	Javed Ali	6:07
Total length:			42:41

== Reception ==
The film received mostly negative reviews from critics. However it has now attainted cult-like status after YouTuber 'The Covert Indian' made a roast video on the movie's ridiculous plot-line and laughable cricket action.
