= Raama Raavanan =

- Directed by: Biju Vattappara
- Written by: Biju Vattappara
- Produced by: Raaffi Mathirra
- Starring: Suresh Gopi; Mithra Kurian; Biju Menon; Nedumudi Venu
- Cinematography: Jibu Jacob
- Edited by: Samjith Mohd
- Music by: Kaithapram
- Production company: Ifar International
- Distributed by: Beebah Creations
- Release date: 30 July 2010
- Running time: 125 minutes
- Country: India
- Language: Malayalam

Raama Raavanan is a 2010 film based on the novel Manomi by Madhavikutty. It is directed by Biju Vattappara and produced by Raaffi Mathirra under the banner Ifar International. It stars Suresh Gopi, Mithra Kurian, Nedumudi Venu, Biju Menon, Sudheesh, Baburaj, Sonia, Krishna, Lena and others. The film was released on 30 July 2010.

== Story ==
The story takes place in two countries: India and Sri Lanka. Annadurai was living with family in Sri Lanka. When the fight between the Tamilians and Sinhalese broke out, he fled to India with his family. There he lived in Tamil Nadu-Kerala border. When he was in Lanka he gave protection to a Sinhalese child named Manomi, who lost her mother. After some years she reaches Annadurai's residence. But the whole family except Annadurai hated her. During this period, Thiruchelvam, a member of LTTE sought shelter in Annadurai's house. His acquaintance with Manomi led to love. Manomi and Thiruchelvam love each other. Thiruchelvam reminded her that LTTE was against Sinhalese and it would affect their relationship. Other members of his gang also opposed the relationship with Manomi as he was assigned to carry out a mission.

== Cast ==
- Suresh Gopi as Thiruchelvam
- Mithra Kurian as Manomi
- Nedumudi Venu as Annadurai
- Biju Menon as SP Surya Narayanan
- Baburaj as Kathireshan
- Mehad Babu as Subru
- Master Habeeb M.R. as Abi
- Lena as Malli
- Narayanankutty
- Sona Nair
- Vadivukkarasi
- Krishna
