= Betsy Beutler =

American actress

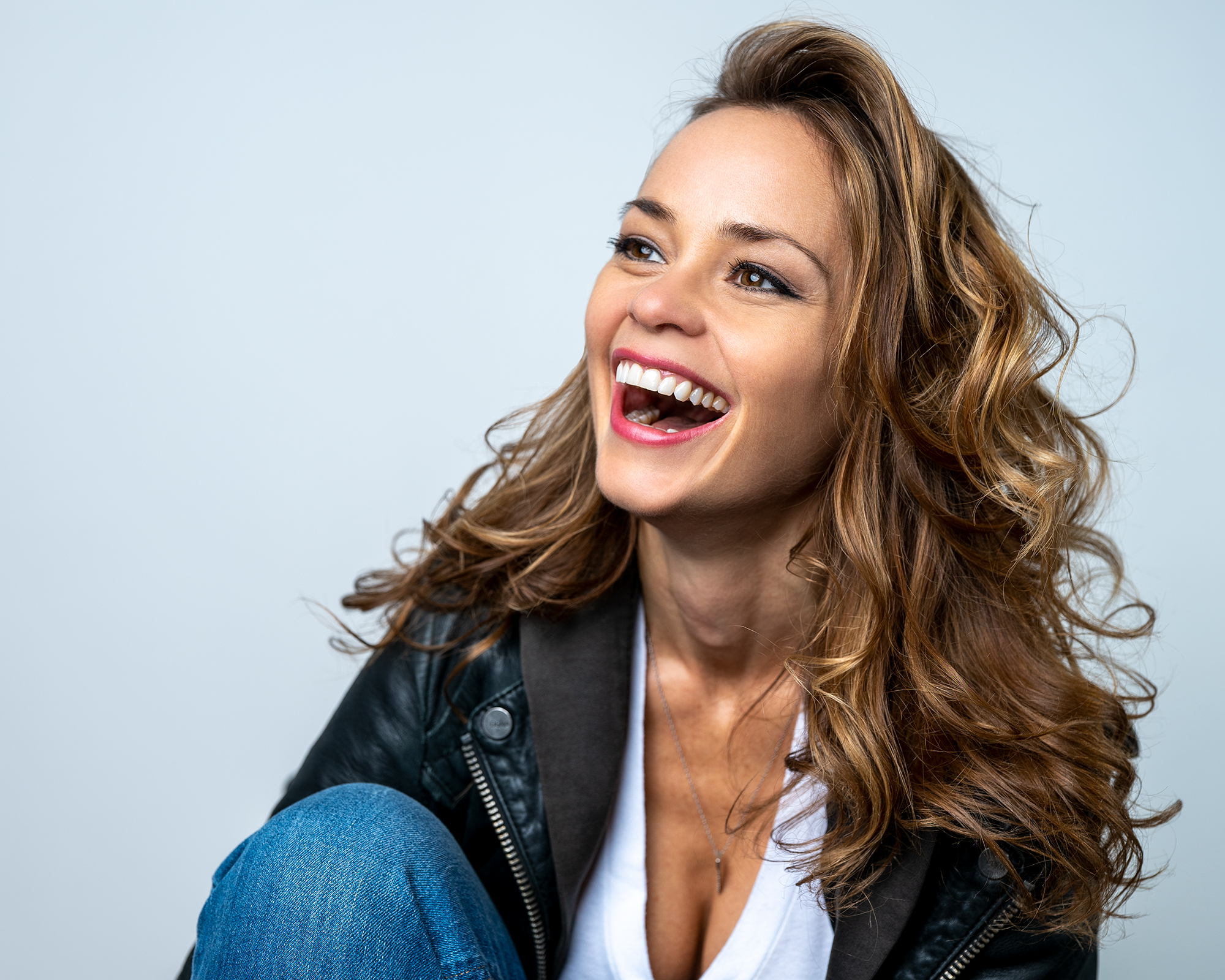
- Beutler in 2020
- Born: Oklahoma, U.S.
- Occupation: Actress
- Years active: 2004–present
- Website: betsybeutler.com

Betsy Beutler is an American actress. She has had roles on Scrubs and its spin-off web series Scrubs: Interns (both 2009), and The Black Donnellys (2007), as well as guest appearances on Legit (2014), You're the Worst (2015), Law & Order: Special Victims Unit (2017) and Blindspot (2017). She also starred in the film Inside Game (2019).

== Life and career ==
Beutler was born in Oklahoma. A series regular on The Black Donnellys, which filmed in New York City, She moved to Los Angeles after its cancellation and was cast in Scrubs.

== Filmography ==
Year	Film	Role
2007	Spinning into Butter	Lee
2007	Wasting Away	Cindy
2008	Smooch	Randi Spotswood
2013	The Playback Singer	Jade
2013	Partners	Katie
2014	Last Look	Susan / Patricia
2018	The Brawler	Donna
2019	Inside Game	Debbie Battista
2021	Last Call	Carla
2021	Christmas vs. The Walters	Kate
2022	Sanctioning Evil	Ann
2025	Moments of Youth	Darcy Crenshaw

=== Television ===
Year	Film	Role	Notes
2004	Third Watch	Brandy Pinkerton	1 Episode
2005	Law & Order: Special Victims Unit	Kidnap Victim	1 episode
2006	One Life to Live	Nina	2 episodes
2006	As the World Turns	Skylar	1 episode
2006	Law & Order	Nicole Milton	1 episode
2007	The Black Donnellys	Joanie	11 episodes
2007	The Bronx Is Burning	Stacy Moscowitz	1 episode in mini-series
2007	Cold Case	Regie Kunze '82	1 episode
2009	Random! Cartoons	Parsley	1 episode
2009	Scrubs: Interns	Katie	6 episodes
2009	Scrubs	Katie	7 episodes
2010	In Security	Lorna Collins	TV movie
2010	Becoming Famous	Jessica	1 episode
2013	Partners	Katie	TV movie
2014	Legit	Sara	2 episodes
2015	You're the Worst	Cory	2 episodes
2016	Pitch	Jackie Lawson	1 episode
2017	Blindspot	Tess Bartell	1 episode
2017	Hawaii Five-0	Nurse Anna	1 episode
2017	Rosewood	Myra Reeves	1 episode
2017	Law & Order: Special Victims Unit	Julie Wade	1 episode
2025	Countdown (American TV series)	Val Sparks	1 episode

=== Video games ===
Year	Title	Voice Role
2009	Dragon Age: Origins	Dagna / Nola / Nessa's Mother
2018	Red Dead Redemption II	The Local Pedestrian Population
