= Note Out =

- Note Out - release poster
- Directed by: Kutty Naduvil
- Written by: Kutty Naduvil; Y. V. Rajesh
- Produced by: Joseph George
- Starring: Nishan; Mithra Kurian; Bijukkuttan; Anoop Chandran; Sumesh; Shiya
- Cinematography: Dilip Raman
- Music by: Vinu Thomas
- Production company: Thekkadiyil Films
- Distributed by: Thekkadiyil Films; Play House Release
- Release date: 14 January 2011
- Country: India
- Language: Malayalam

Note Out is a 2011 Malayalam comedy film directed by debutant Kutty Naduvil starring Nishan and Mithra Kurian in the lead roles. The music of the film has been composed by Vinu Thomas with lyrics written by Anil Panachooran. The film was released on 14 January 2011. The film is produced by Joseph George in the banner of Thekkadiyil Films, who also distributes the film through Play House Release.

== Plot ==
Note Out tells the story of a group of youngsters led by Pavithran who lead a care-free life with neither much aspirations nor any definite goals. A smart young girl happened to come across their life which leads to so many unexpected incidents.

== Cast ==
- Nishan as Pavithran
- Roslin as Pavithran's mother
- Mithra Kurian as Maya
- Jagathy Sreekumar as S. I. Eerally
- Suraj Venjaramood as Vasu
- Bijukuttan as Ajeesh/Aji
- Subbalakshmi
- Anoop Chandran
- Alikkoya
- K. T. C. Abdulla
- Raghavan Purakkadu
- Joseph George
- Shibinas
- Lishoy as Pavithran's Father
