= Scrubs: Interns =

- Created by: Bill Lawrence
- Written by: Devin Mahoney; Melody Derloshon; Ryan Kemp
- Directed by: Eren Celeboglu
- Starring: Sonal Shah; Betsy Beutler; Eliza Coupe; Todd Bosley
- Opening theme: "Don't Tell Me" by The Blanks
- Country of origin: United States
- No. of seasons: 1
- No. of episodes: 12

Production
- Running time: 3–5 minutes
- Production company: ABC Studios

Original release
- Network: ABC.com
- Release: January 1 – June 2, 2009

Related
- Scrubs

Scrubs: Interns is an American web series from ABC based on the comedy-drama series Scrubs in its eighth season, which originally aired on ABC.com; each episode would premiere the day a new Scrubs episode aired on TV. The webisodes originally premiered between January 1 and April 8, 2009, with two additional episodes being released on the season eight DVD and Blu-ray set, on May 26 and June 2, 2009.

The webisodes feature four interns in their first year at Sacred Heart Hospital – Katie Collins (Betsy Beutler), Denise "Jo" Mahoney (Eliza Coupe), Howie Gelder (Todd Bosley) and Sonja "Sunny" Dey (Sonal Shah), who "directs" the series as a video diary project. Ed Dhandapani (Aziz Ansari) is mentioned in passing but only appears in the final webisode.

Each of the main cast members of Scrubs appears in at least one webisode. Two recurring cast members, Ted and The Todd, also make appearances.

Some of the episodes relate directly to the main series. For example, "Screw You with Ted and the Gooch" consists largely of an unabridged scene from "My Lawyer's in Love."

== Cast ==
- Sonal Shah as Sonia "Sunny" Dey (12 episodes)
- Eliza Coupe as Denise "Jo" Mahoney (9)
- Betsy Beutler as Katie Collins (8)
- Todd Bosley as Howie Gelder (8)
- Sam Lloyd as Ted Buckland (6)
- Neil Flynn as The Janitor (4)
- Robert Maschio as Dr. Todd Quinlan (4)
- John C. McGinley as Dr. Perry Cox (1)
- Zach Braff as Dr. John "J.D." Dorian (1)
- Sarah Chalke as Dr. Elliot Reid (1)
- Donald Faison as Dr. Chris Turk (1)
- Judy Reyes as Nurse Carla Espinosa (1)
- Ken Jenkins as Dr. Bob Kelso (1)
- Taran Killam as Jimmy the Overly Touchy Orderly (1)
- Kate Micucci as Stephanie Gooch (1)
- Aziz Ansari as Ed Dhandapani (1)
- Philip McNiven as Roy (1)
- George Miserlis as Crispin (1)
- Paul Perry as Randall (1)
- Devin Mahoney as Chubby guy (1)
- Eren Celeboglu as Patient (1)

== Theme song ==
The theme song of Scrubs: Interns is "Don't Tell Me" by The Blanks (known as Ted's Band or The Worthless Peons on Scrubs).

== Webisodes ==
No.	Title	Directed by	Written by	Original release date
1	"Our Intern Class"	Eren Celeboglu	Devin Mahoney	January 1, 2009
Sunny introduces herself, Katie, Denise, Ed, and Howie in her video diary and the new interns sit through Ted and Dr. Cox's orientation.
2	"Our Meeting with J.D."	Eren Celeboglu	Melody Derloshon	January 7, 2009
Denise and Katie talk about their sex lives, J.D. lectures the new interns on hospital jargon and Sunny receives a mysterious note.
3	"Our Meeting in the Broom Closet"	Eren Celeboglu	Melody Derloshon	January 13, 2009
The interns meet with The Janitor in his office where he sets some ground rules for their behavior.
4	"Screw You with Ted and the Gooch"	Eren Celeboglu	Melody Derloshon	January 27, 2009
Sunny has her day off and shows footage of Ted and Stephanie singing.
5	"The Late Night with Jimmy Show"	Eren Celeboglu	Ryan Kemp	February 3, 2009
Jimmy takes Sunny's camera and hosts a fake talk show.
6	"Our Meeting with the Braintrust"	Eren Celeboglu	Devin Mahoney	February 10, 2009
Sunny visits the Braintrust headquarters where The Janitor tells Sunny about his and Ted's comedy show Legal Custodians and says that Sunny should write the pilot.
7	"Legal Custodians Outtakes"	Eren Celeboglu	Ryan Kemp	March 18, 2009
The Janitor has a hard time getting Ted to cooperate while making Legal Custodians while The Todd can't stay behind the scenes on the set.
8	"Our Bedside Manner"	Eren Celeboglu	Devin Mahoney	March 25, 2009
Elliot meets with Denise and Sunny about their bedside manners.
9	"Our Meeting with Turk and the Todd"	Eren Celeboglu	Ryan Kemp	April 1, 2009
Turk and The Todd tell the interns how to tell the differences between surgeons and medical doctors.
10	"Our Final Advice"	Eren Celeboglu	Ryan Kemp	April 8, 2009
Dr. Kelso shares some final advice with Sunny on how to enjoy her time as a doctor and the interns reflect on the lessons they have learned around Sacred Heart.
11	"Our Meeting with Carla"	Eren Celeboglu	Melody Derloshon	May 26, 2009
Carla explains to the interns how to respect the nurses.
12	"Legal Custodians Episode"	Eren Celeboglu	Melody Derloshon	June 2, 2009
The Janitor and Ted introduce the first episode of Legal Custodians.
