= Shakti (disambiguation) =

Shakti, in Hinduism, is the "Universal Power" that underlies and sustains all existence.

Shakti or Shakthi may also refer to:

== Films and television ==
- Sakthi (1972 film), an Indian Malayalam film released in 1972 starring V. Ravichandran and Sheela
- Sakthi (1980 film), an Indian Malayalam film released in 1980 starring Jayan and Seema
- Shakti (1982 film), Bollywood film starring Dilip Kumar, Amitabh Bachchan, and Anil Kapoor
- Sakthi (1997 film), 1997 Tamil film
- Shakti (2002 film), a Bollywood film starring Karisma Kapoor, Nana Patekar, and Aishwarya Rai
- Shakti (2004 film), a Bengali-language film
- Shakti (2011 film), a Tollywood film starring Ileana D'Cruz
- Shakti (2012 film), a Kannada-language film
- Shakti (2019 film), an Argentine Spanish-language short film
- Sakthi (TV series), an Indian Tamil-language soap opera
- Shakti – Astitva Ke Ehsaas Ki, an Indian socio-drama TV series

== Music ==
- Shakti (band), musical group with John McLaughlin and L. Shankar
  - Shakti (Shakti album)
- Shakti (David S. Ware album), a 2009 album by saxophonist David S. Ware
- Shakti Records, former music label of Narada Productions

== Fiction ==
- Shakti (comics), a fictional character published by Raj Comics
- Shakti Haddad, alter ego of Cerebra, fictional superhero in the Marvel Comics universe
- Shakti Kareen, a fictional character from Mobile Suit Victory Gundam

== People ==
- Shakthi (cinematographer), Tamil cinematographer
- Shakthi (playwright), aka S Shakthidharan, Sri Lankan/Australian playwright and screenwriter
- Shakti Bahadur Basnet (born 1971), Nepalese politician
- Shakti Chattopadhyay (1934–1995), Bengali poet
- Shakti Kapoor (born 1952), Bollywood actor
- Shakti Mohan, dancer and actor
- Shakti Raj, Indian politician
- Shakti Samanta (1926–2009), Bollywood director and producer

== Computing ==
- SHAKTI (microprocessor), open-source RISC-V computer from India
- Shakti Software, company and database system by Arthur Whitney (computer scientist)

== Other uses ==
- Mission Shakti, the anti-satellite missile test conducted by India in 2019
- Operation Shakti, round of nuclear tests conducted by India in 1998

== See also ==
- Prem Shakti (1994 film), Bollywood film starring Shakti Kapoor
- Shaak Ti, a fictional character in the Star Wars universe
- Shakhty, town in the eastern Donbass area of Russia
- Shakta pithas, places of worship consecrated to the goddess Shakti
- Sakthi (disambiguation)
