= Suriyan Satta Kalloori =

- Directed by: R. Pavan
- Written by: R. Pavan (dialogues)
- Screenplay by: R. Pavan
- Story by: Sivasakthi Pandian
- Produced by: Sivasakthi Pandian
- Starring: Kajni; Mithra Kurian
- Cinematography: U. K. Senthil Kumar
- Edited by: S. Surajkavee
- Music by: Deva
- Production company: S. S. Movie Makers
- Release date: 25 September 2009
- Running time: 140 minutes
- Country: India
- Language: Tamil

Suriyan Satta Kalloori (transl. Suriyan, Law College) is a 2009 Tamil language action drama film directed by R. Pavan. The film stars newcomers Kajni and Mithra Kurian, with Radha Ravi, Pawan, M. S. Bhaskar, Ganja Karuppu, Aarthi, Kadhal Sukumar and Chaams playing supporting roles. The film, produced by Sivasakthi Pandian, was released on 25 September 2009.

== Plot ==
The film begins with Suriyan (Kajni) getting into a fight with another cellmate and then remembering about his past.

Suriyan was a model law college student and also the chairman of the student council. Everyone liked him in the college. He and the new student Mahalakshmi (Mithra Kurian) fell in love with each other. Suriyan initiated a proposal for instituting a national 'Best Student' award and travels to Delhi to submit his proposal to the central government. In the meantime, Vetrichelvan (Pawan), with the support of a politician, joins as a student in the same college. Upon his arrival, Thiruchelvan eve teased the college girls, humiliated the professors, and violated the college rules on purpose. Suriyan first tried a soft method to change Vetrichelvan, but it failed, so Suriyan had to use his fists to teach him a lesson. Vetrichelvan was admitted to the hospital in a serious condition, and his twin brother Kalaichelvan (Pawan), a local don, decided to take revenge on Suriyan.

Kalaichelvan posed as Vetrichelvan, entered the college, and acted as a good student. The twin brothers then started playing with Suriyan and confused everyone. They even created a conflict between Suriyan and Mahalakshmi. Suriyan then found out about their trick. During a fight, Suriyan killed the twin brothers in front of Mahalakshmi's eyes to save her as she was abducted. In court, Suriyan, who did not want to disrespect the law, confessed that he had killed them and was sentenced to the death penalty.

Back to the present, the government accepts Suriyan's 'Best Student' project and wants to award Suriyan of the first award. The film ends with Mahalakshmi, the college students, the college principal, and the professors mourning the death of Suriyan.

== Cast ==
- Kajni as Suriyan (Suriyanarayan)
- Mithra Kurian as Mahalakshmi
- Radha Ravi as College Principal
- Pawan as Vetrichelvan and Kalaichelvan
- M. S. Bhaskar as Saama Iyer
- Ganja Karuppu as Idithangi
- Aarthi as Booma
- Kadhal Sukumar as Raghu
- Chaams as Kethu
- Rajyalakshmi as Suriyan's mother
- Besant Ravi as Ravi
- Selvaraj
- Sujibala in a special appearance
- Srikanth Deva in a cameo appearance
- Deva in a cameo appearance

== Production ==
Sivasakthi Pandian, who had produced films like Kadhal Kottai (1996) and Vetri Kodi Kattu (2000), returned after a brief exile with Suriyan Satta Kalloori, a film directed by newcomer R. Pavan. Newcomer Kajni, son of the producer Kaja Mohideen, and Malayalam actress Mithra Kurian were signed to play the lead roles. Actors like Pawan, Radha Ravi, M. S. Bhaskar, Ganja Karuppu, and Aarthi were roped in for playing prominent roles. U. K. Senthil Kumar took care of camera works while Deva scored the music and the editing was handled by S. Surajkavee.

== Soundtrack ==
Suriyan Satta Kalloori

Soundtrack album by Deva
- Released: 2009
- Recorded: 2009
- Genre: Feature film soundtrack
- Length: 23:49
- Producer: Deva

The film score and the soundtrack were composed by Deva. He took 21 days to complete the re-recording. The soundtrack, released in 2009, features 5 tracks with lyrics written by Kabilan and R. Pavan.

Track	Song	Singer(s)	Lyrics	Duration
1	"Kalaai Kalaai Kalaaikkirai"	Udit Narayan, Janani Bharadwaj	Kabilan	5:28
2	"Guru Brahmma Guru Vishnu"	Hariharan, Sadhana Sargam	Kabilan	4:46
3	"Kaadhal Panna Poriya"	Deva	Kabilan	4:06
4	"Masakki Masakki"	Nirthiya	Kabilan	4:46
5	"Theeka Theeka Theekana"	Chinnaponnu	R. Pavan	4:43

== Release ==
The film was released on 25 September 2009 alongside four other films.

=== Critical reception ===
S. R. Ashok Kumar of The Hindu said, "One does welcome the story, written by producer Sivasakthi Pandian, which has such a message. The director in his screenplay also has many loose ends that ultimately leave a lot of questions unanswered". Pavithra Srinivasan of Rediff.com rated the film 1 out of 5 and wrote, "Suriyan Satta Kalloori tries to address real problems and gives solutions but it's done in such a cheesy, clichéd fashion, with wooden acting and special effects that the message itself is hopelessly lost".

=== Box office ===
The film took a below average opening at the Chennai box office.
