= Miss India America =

- Directed by: Ravi Kapoor
- Written by: Ravi Kapoor; Meera Simhan
- Produced by: Megha Kadakia; Saurabh Kikani
- Starring: Tiya Sircar; Hannah Simone; Kosha Patel; Meera Simhan; Bernard White; Satya Bhabha; Cas Anvar; Kunal Sharma; Anjali Bhimani
- Cinematography: Alan Caudillo
- Edited by: Varun Viswanath
- Music by: Amritha Vaz
- Production companies: Mr. Kicks and Lady Megs; Simhan and Kapoor
- Distributed by: MarVista Entertainment
- Release dates: 27 February 2015 (Cinequest Film Festival); 14 March 2016 (US)
- Running time: 93 minutes
- Country: United States
- Language: English

Miss India America is a 2015 American comedy-drama film directed by Ravi Kapoor, starring Tiya Sircar and Hannah Simone.

== Cast ==
- Tiya Sircar as Lily Prasad
- Hannah Simone as Sonia Nielson
- Kosha Patel as Seema
- Meera Simhan as Gita Prasad
- Bernard White as Sam Prasad
- Satya Bhabha as Sanjay
- Cas Anvar as Deep Panday
- Kunal Sharma as Karim
- Anjali Bhimani as Pinky Matthews
- Anushka Rani as Nita Nanji
- Sameera Rock as Reshma Mathur
- Anna George as Divya Nielson
- Rima Rajan as Preeti Grewal
- Chriselle Almeida as Bindu Kapoor
- Nandini Minocha as Bindu's mother
- Vikki Gurdas as Renu Nanji
- Kevin Symons as Dr. Mike
- Sonal Shah as Volunteer 1
- Kristina Anapau as Soap Opera Patient
- Rachna Khatau as MC
- Rizwan Manji as Balu Patel

== Reception ==
Justin Lowe of The Hollywood Reporter wrote that the film has "genuine charm" and praised the script and the performances of Sircar and Simone.

Allen Pham of the Daily Trojan called the film "campy" and "enjoyable".

Ben Sachs of the Chicago Reader wrote that the film "hews closely to Hollywood formula despite being an independent production."

The film won Best Screenplay at the Los Angeles Asian Pacific Film Festival and the CAAM Fest Narrative Jury Award for Best Feature.
