= Priyasaki (TV series) =

- Genre: Soap opera
- Written by: C.U. Muthuselven
- Directed by: Parameshwar; Ramana gopi
- Starring: Arnav Amjathkhan; Mithra Kurian; Nikila Rao; Ashwin Kumar; Arun Kumar Rajan; Raj Mohan; Nithya Ravindran; Raja; Minnal Deepa; Sai Madhavi
- Country of origin: India
- Original language: Tamil
- No. of episodes: 242

Production
- Producers: Tamillarsi Muthusselven; K.Jodhy
- Editors: J. Sathiya Murthi; Sajin C
- Camera setup: Multi-camera
- Running time: 22 minutes

Original release
- Network: Zee Tamil
- Release: 8 June 2015 – 20 May 2016

Priyasaki is a soap opera that aired on Zee Tamil from 8 June 2015 to 20 May 2016 for 242 episodes. The show starred Mithra Kurian, Nikila Rao, Arnav, Arun Kumar and among others. The show Directed by Parameshwar.

== Plot ==
Divya is working in an event management company and out of her meagre income she manages her family. She pays all college fees and expenditures of her younger sister Kirthika and her younger brother. Her father Chandrashekar does not pay a pie to the family. He repeatedly tries his luck in Real Estate along with other friends, but fails to make any headway. He tells his family that one day he will become a millionaire and his wife believes it.

Divya the heroine of this serial falls in love with Karthick. Both their family accept their love and fix their marriage. Love between the two strengthens. They both are helped as a mediator in their love by Gayathri. Karthick leaves for Singapore on urgent project work.

As fortune have it Divya is adopted by a rich businessman Rajarathinam. Subbulaxmi the wife of Rajarathinam had entered into the life of Rajarathinam 20 years back in order to take revenge on him. Divya is a stumble block to her so she plans and throws her out from the house.

== Cast ==
- Mithra Kurian as Dhivya
- Nikhila Rao in a dual role as
  - Dhivya - She replaced Kurian in the role of Dhivya as face transplantation. The difference in appearance was explained by the character having plastic surgery.
  - Sathya - Old role played by her, from aired time
- Arnav as Anbazhagan "Anbu"
- Ashwin Kumar as Karthik
- Arun Kumar Rajan as Prabu
- Shalini as Rakshana
- Ferozkhan as Ashok
- Raj Mohan as Chandrasekar (Dhivya's father)
- Nithya as Dhamayanthi (Dhivya's mother)
- Raja as Rajarathinam (One who adopt's Dhivya)
- Ravi Shankar Anbu's brother-in-law
- Gayathri Yuvraaj as Abhi
- Shabnam
- Surekha
- Sai Madhavi as Abhi's 1st Elder sister
- Minnal Deepa as Abhi's sister
- Balasubramani
- Kamal Hassan
