= Wanted (2009 film) =

2009 Indian film by Prabhu Deva

- Theatrical release poster
- Directed by: Prabhu Deva
- Written by: Shiraz Ahmed
- Story by: Puri Jagannadh
- Based on: Pokiri (2006) (Telugu) by Puri Jagannadh
- Produced by: Boney Kapoor
- Starring: Salman Khan; Ayesha Takia; Prakash Raj; Vinod Khanna; Mahesh Manjrekar
- Cinematography: Nirav Shah; Sethu Sriram
- Edited by: Dilip Deo
- Music by: Songs: Sajid–Wajid; Score: Salim–Sulaiman
- Production companies: Eros International; BSK Network & Entertainment
- Distributed by: Sahara One Motion Pictures
- Release date: 18 September 2009
- Running time: 178 minutes
- Country: India
- Language: Hindi
- Budget: US$5 million
- Box office: US$12 million

Wanted is a 2009 Indian Hindi-language action thriller film directed by Prabhu Deva, who was the director of the remake of Tamil film Pokkiri (2007). Produced by Boney Kapoor. The film is a remake of Telugu film Pokiri (2006), stars Salman Khan, alongside Prakash Raj, Ayesha Takia, Vinod Khanna, Mahesh Manjrekar with Arvind Swamy, Govinda and Anil Kapoor making special appearances. The soundtrack was composed by Sajid–Wajid, while the musical score was handled by Salim–Sulaiman. The cinematography and editing were handled by Nirav Shah and Sethu Sriram and Dilip Deo, respectively.

The film was shot primarily in Mumbai, with songs filmed in Australia and other foreign countries.

Wanted was released on 18 September 2009 to positive reviews from critics with praise for its cast performances, music, and action sequences. The film grossed around US$12 million.

== Plot ==
In Mumbai, two rival gangs headed by Gani Bhai, a Dubai-based crime boss, and Datta Pawle commit extortion, contract, and coercion to take control of the city's land mafia. The newly appointed Commissioner of Police Ashraf Taufiq Khan starts busting down crimes in the city.

Radhe, a money-minded rogue living with his friends in Mumbai, thrashes Gani Bhai's henchmen Genghis, as Pawle assigned Radhe a contract to thrash Genghis. Later, Radhe joins Gani Bhai's gang for monetary reasons. Radhe falls in love with Jahnvi, an aerobics teacher who lives with her widowed mother, Lakshmi, and younger brother Ballu. Sonu Gates, a software engineer, lives above Jahnvi's house and frequently tries to convince Jahnvi to marry him. Daulat Talpade, a corrupt Senior Inspector and Gani Bhai's informer, lusts for Jahnvi and is determined to make her his mistress despite Jahnvi's objections.

Radhe's first assignment with Gani Bhai's gang is to eliminate Pawle's gang member, but the police arrive at the spot. Radhe engages the cops long enough for the others to finish the task and flee, where he also helps Jahnvi escape from Talpade. Jahnvi is impressed and befriends Radhe, where soon love blossoms between the two. When Jahnvi tries to express her feelings to Radhe, they are attacked by members of Pawle's gang, whom Radhe finishes off. Jahnvi is shocked to learn that Radhe is a gangster with no qualms about killing people. Later, Talpade arranges for some thugs to pretend to assault Jahnvi in order to force Jahnvi to accept Talpade's demands, since no family would accept her as their daughter-in-law. Radhe learns about this and thrashes Talpade secretly. Gani Bhai arrives from Dubai, kills Pawle, and meets Radhe to discuss the killing of a minister by blowing up a school. Radhe disagrees with the plan as it would involve killing innocents.

In the middle of their argument, the police raid the club, arrest Gani Bhai, and torture him. Gani Bhai's gang members retaliate by kidnapping Ashraf's daughter, drugging her, and creating a gang rape video of her, which they threaten to release to the media if Gani Bhai is not released, forcing Ashraf to release Gani Bhai. Ashraf's daughter, in her drugged state, reveals that her father had placed an undercover cop as a mole in Gani Bhai's gang.

The gang members learn that Rajveer Shekhawat, the son of retired Inspector Shrikant Shekhawat, has gone undercover to eliminate mafia gangs and is now a part of their gang. Enraged, Gani Bhai kills Ajay, believing that he is Rajveer. However, it is revealed that Ajay was actually Shrikant's adopted son. Gani Bhai kills Shrikant to lure the real Rajveer. When Rajveer actually turns up, everyone, especially Jahnvi and Talpade, is shocked to see that Rajveer is actually Radhe.

Rajveer had gone undercover by posing as Radhe and had killed all the gangsters under Ashraf's orders. After Shrikant and Ajay's funerals, Radhe forces Talpade to call Gani Bhai and learn that Gani Bhai is in Binny Mills. Radhe arrives at Binny Mills and starts eliminating Gani Bhai's gang members, rescuing Ashraf's daughter in the process. In a final confrontation, Radhe kills Gani Bhai by slashing his throat with a broken glass window. Radhe shoots Talpade and tells the following words: Ek bar joh maine commitment kar di uske baad toh main khud ki bhi nahi sunta (transl. Once I am committed, I won't even listen to my own words).

== Cast ==
- Vinod Khanna as Shrikant Shekhawat
- Salman Khan as ACP Rajveer Shekhawat Indian Police Service IPS / Radhe
- Ayesha Takia as Jahnvi Verma, Radhe's love interest.
- Mahesh Manjrekar as Inspector Daulat R. Talpade
- Sarfaraz Khan as Aslam Khan
- Inder Kumar as Ajay Shekhawat, Shrikant's son.
- Prakash Raj as Shamshuddin Asgar Gani "Ghani Bhai"
- Mahek Chahal as Shaina
- Govind Namdev as DCP Commissioner of Police Ashraf Taufiq Khan
- Aseem Merchant as Golden Bhai
- Harry Josh as Genghis Khan, Golden Bhai's henchman.
- Manoj Pahwa as Sonu Gates
- Sajid Ali as Radhe's friend
- Raju Mavani as Datta Pawle
- G. V. Sudhakar Naidu as Shiva, Datta Pawle's henchman.
- Prateeksha Lonkar as Lakshmi Verma
- Anupam Shyam as Dilip Topi
- Vinod Talwar as Ashok Gulati
- Vijay Patkar as Ganesh
- Manesha Chatarji as Ashraf's daughter
- Anil Kapoor in the song "Jalwa" (special appearance)
- Govinda in the song "Jalwa" (special appearance)
- Prabhu Deva in the song "Jalwa" (special appearance)

== Production ==
Asin and Ileana D'Cruz were approached for the role of Janhvi, but they rejected the offer, and the role went to Ayesha Takia. Nana Patekar was offered the role of Gani Bhai, but due to his busy schedule, the role went to Prakash Raj, who was seen in the original remake. In a recent 'Jhalak Dikhhla Jaa 11' episode, Boney Kapoor revealed how his third pitch convinced Salman Khan to do Wanted. After two failed attempts, Boney urged Salman to watch the film, leading to its iconic success. The parts of the film were shot in Greek Islands of Rodos, Santorini, and Paros.

== Music ==
Wanted

Soundtrack album by Sajid–Wajid
- Released: 10 August 2009 (India)
- Recorded: 2008–09
- Genre: Feature film soundtrack
- Label: T-Series
- Producer: Sajid–Wajid

Sajid–Wajid chronology
Kal Kissne Dekha (2009)	Wanted (2009)	Main Aurr Mrs Khanna (2009)

Professional ratings
Review scores
Source	Rating
Bollywood Hungama	2.5/5 stars

The music of the film was given by Sajid–Wajid. The album received mixed to negative reviews from critics, with some songs seeing a positive response. The songs "Jalwa", "Love Me Love Me", and "Le Le Maza Le" became a huge hit among the audiences.

No.	Title	Lyrics	Singer(s)	Length
1.	"Ishq Vishq (Main Yahan Tu Bhi Yahan)"	Sameer	Kamaal Khan, Sunidhi Chauhan, Suzanne D'Mello	04:48
2.	"Dil Leke"	Arun Bhairav	Shaan, Shreya Ghoshal, Suzanne D'Mello	04:35
3.	"Le Le Mazaa Le"	Wajid Ali, Shabbir Ahmed	Suzanne D'Mello, Sowmya Raoh, Hrishikesh Kamerkar, Nikita Nigam, Carlyta Mouhini	04:11
4.	"Jalwa"	Jalees Sherwani	Wajid Khan, Earl Edgar D'Souza	04:31
5.	"Tose Pyaar Karte Hai"	Shabbir Ahmed	Wajid Ali, Sunidhi Chauhan	03:47
6.	"Most Wanted Track"	Salman Khan	Salman Khan, Sajid-Wajid & Brodha V	04:26
7.	"Love Me Love Me"	Jalees Sherwani	Wajid Ali, Amrita Kak	04:06
8.	"Dil Leke" (Remixed by Dj A-Myth)	Arun Bhairav	Shaan, Shreya Ghoshal	03:15
9.	"Ishq Vishq" (Remixed by Dj A-Myth)	Sameer	Kamaal Khan, Sunidhi Chauhan, Suzanne D'Mello	04:04
10.	"Jalwa On The House" (Remixed by Dj Akbar Sami)	Jalees Sherwani	Wajid Ali, Earl D'Souza	04:15
11.	"Tose Pyar Karte Hai" (Remixed by Dj Akbar Sami)	Shabbir Ahmed	Wajid Ali, Earl D'Souza, Sunidhi Chauhan	04:53
12.	"Love Me Love Me" ((Mama Papa Mix) remixed by Dj Akbar Sami)	Jalees Sherwani	Wajid Ali, Amrita Kak	04:43

== Reception ==
=== Critical response ===
Wanted received positive reviews from critics.

Nikhat Kazmi of The Times of India gave 4/5 stars and wrote "With this film, the knuckle-crushing action flick roars back in an improved avtaar." Taran Adarsh of Bollywood Hungama gave 4/5 stars and wrote "Wanted is a full on masala film, which takes you back to those days when popular cinema reigned supreme, when the sole motive of the film-maker was to entertain." Indicine gave 3/5 stars, calling it "watchable for Salman Khan" and the "best out and out action flick of Bollywood." Raja Sen of Rediff gave 3/5 stars and wrote "Wanted is a modern-day rarity, a actioner that really doesn't spend any time trying to class up its tackiness or pretend to make sense. Khan might be having fun, but the fact a film like Wanted underscores is how badly Bollywood needs a breed of younger leading men."

=== Accolades ===
2010 Filmfare Awards

- Best Action – Vijayan Master

2010 IIFA Awards

- Nominated: IIFA Award for Best Movie – Boney Kapoor
- Nominated: IIFA Award for Best Actor – Salman Khan
- Nominated: IIFA Award for Best Performance in a Negative Role – Prakash Raj

Stardust Awards

- Best Film of the Year – Action / Thriller – Boney Kapoor

Star Screen Awards

- Best Action – Vijayan Master

== Legacy ==
Wanted's success kick-started Salman Khan's career as an action hero and boosted his super-stardom. This film started Khan's tradition of releasing his films on the occasion of Eid. His dialogue from the film "Ek bar joh maine commitment kar di uske baad toh main khud ki bhi nahi sunta" (transl. Once I have made a commitment, I won't listen to myself) became one of his most iconic dialogues. This film also started the trend of Khan going shirtless in his climax fight scenes, which includes films like Dabangg, Bodyguard and Ready.
