= Mithra Kurian =

Indian actress

- Born: Dalma Kurian; Perumbavoor, Kerala, India
- Occupation: Actress
- Years active: 2009–present
- Known for: Body Guard
- Spouse: William Francis (Music director) (m. 2015)
- Parent(s): Kurian; Baby
- Relatives: Danny Kurian (brother)

Mithra Kurian (born Dalma Kurian), is an Indian actress who works in Malayalam and Tamil films. Her notable works include Body Guard (2010) and Kaavalan (2011).

== Career ==
She first appeared in a supporting role in the 2004 Malayalam movie, Vismayathumbathu, in a single scene as Nayanthara's friend, directed by Fazil. She then appeared in 2005 film Mayookham directed by T. Hariharan, following which she took a break from acting and concentrated on her studies. She was then cast by director Siddique in a supporting role for his Tamil film Sadhu Miranda (2008), after he saw Mithra on a cover of an issue of the magazine Grihalakshmi. Afterwards, she starred in another Tamil film, the low-budget venture Suriyan Satta Kalloori (2009), which was panned by critics.

Mithra subsequently appeared in notable Malayalam films, and gained considerable attention, by her choice of characters in films like Gulumal: The Escape (2009) and Body Guard (2010). She was the lead actress in the comedy flick Gulumal, which turned out to be a superhit movie. She appeared as a supporting character in the Dileep-starrer Bodyguard, again under Siddique's direction, which became another hit. Gaining critical acclaim for her performance as Sethulakshmi, she was selected by Siddique to reprise the role in its Tamil remake, Kaavalan, as well. She went to act in a few more Tamil and Malayalam films.

=== Other works ===
She has judged popular reality shows Dance Party and Mummy and Me both on Kairali TV.

After her marriage, she made her debut into TV serial in Tamil with Priyasaki.

== Personal life ==
Mithra was born as Dalma to Malayali Syrian Christian parents Kurian and Baby, at Perumbavoor, Kerala. She has a younger brother, Dani Kurian. She completed her Bachelor of Business Administration (B.B.A.). She is a distant relative of Nayantara. In January 2015, she married her long-time beau William Francis at a ceremony in Kochi.

KSRTC officials filed a complaint against Mithra accusing her of assaulting and verbally abusing one of its staff. The complaint states that Mithra, along with her friends entered KSRTC bus stand premises, where entry of non-KSRTC vehicles are barred. The complaint says she assaulted driver Ramdas for scratching her car.

== Filmography ==
=== Films ===
Year	Film	Role	Language	Notes
2004	Vismayathumbathu	Sarala Menon	Malayalam	
2005	Mayookham	Unni's sister	Malayalam	
2008	Sadhu Miranda	Lakshmi	Tamil	Uncredited role
2009	Suriyan Satta Kalloori	Mahalakshmi	Tamil	
2009	Gulumal: The Escape	Saira	Malayalam	
2010	Body Guard	Sethulakshmi	Malayalam	Winner Vanitha Film Awards for Best Supporting Actress
2010	Raama Raavanan	Manomi	Malayalam	
2011	Note Out	Maya	Malayalam	
2011	Kaavalan	Madhu	Tamil	Nominated–Filmfare Award for Best Supporting Actress – Tamil
2011	Ulakam Chuttum Valiban	Kalyani	Malayalam	
2012	Masters	Sheetal	Malayalam	
2012	Grandmaster	Bindhya	Malayalam	
2013	Kantha		Tamil	
2013	Sandhithathum Sindhithathum	Yeshwanth's daughter	Tamil	Cameo Appearance
2013	Ladies and Gentleman	Chinnu	Malayalam	
2014	Oru Korean Padam	Eva	Malayalam	
2015	Buddhanin Sirippu	Nethra	Tamil	
2019	Nandhanam	Divya	Tamil	

=== Television ===
Year	Film	Language	Channel	Role	Notes
2010	Sa Re Ga Ma	Malayalam	Asianet	Participant	Game show
2013	Ruchibhedam	Malayalam	ACV	Celebrity Presenter	Cookery show
2014	Mummy and Me	Malayalam	Kairali TV	Judge	Reality show
2014	Dance Party	Malayalam	Kairali TV	Judge	Reality show
2015-2016	Priyasakhi	Tamil	Zee Tamil	Divya	TV serial
2017-2018	Azhagu	Tamil	Sun TV	Aishwarya	TV serial
2021–2022	Amma Makal	Malayalam	Zee Keralam	Sangeetha	TV serial, Won, Kalabhavan Mani Memorial Awards 2022 - Best Actress
