= Odontogomphus donnellyi =

Pinchtail

Conservation status
- Data Deficient (IUCN 3.1)

Scientific classification
- Kingdom: Animalia
- Phylum: Arthropoda
- Clade: Pancrustacea
- Class: Insecta
- Order: Odonata
- Suborder: Anisoptera
- Family: Gomphidae
- Genus: Odontogomphus; Watson, 1991
- Species: O. donnellyi

Binomial name
- Odontogomphus donnellyi Watson, 1991

Species of dragonfly

Odontogomphus donnellyi is a species of dragonfly of the family Gomphidae, known as a pinchtail. It is endemic to north-eastern Queensland, Australia, where it inhabits rainforest streams. It is a medium-sized and slender dragonfly with black and greenish-yellow markings.

Odontogomphus donnellyi is the only known species in the genus Odontogomphus.

== Etymology ==
The genus name Odontogomphus is derived from the Greek ὀδών (odōn, "tooth"), combined with Gomphus, a genus name derived from the Greek γόμφος (gomphos, "peg" or "nail"). The name refers to tooth-like projections near the tip of the abdomen.

In 1991, Tony Watson named this species donnellyi, an eponym honouring T. W. Donnelly (1932–2025), a geologist and odonatologist who collected the original specimens.

== Gallery ==
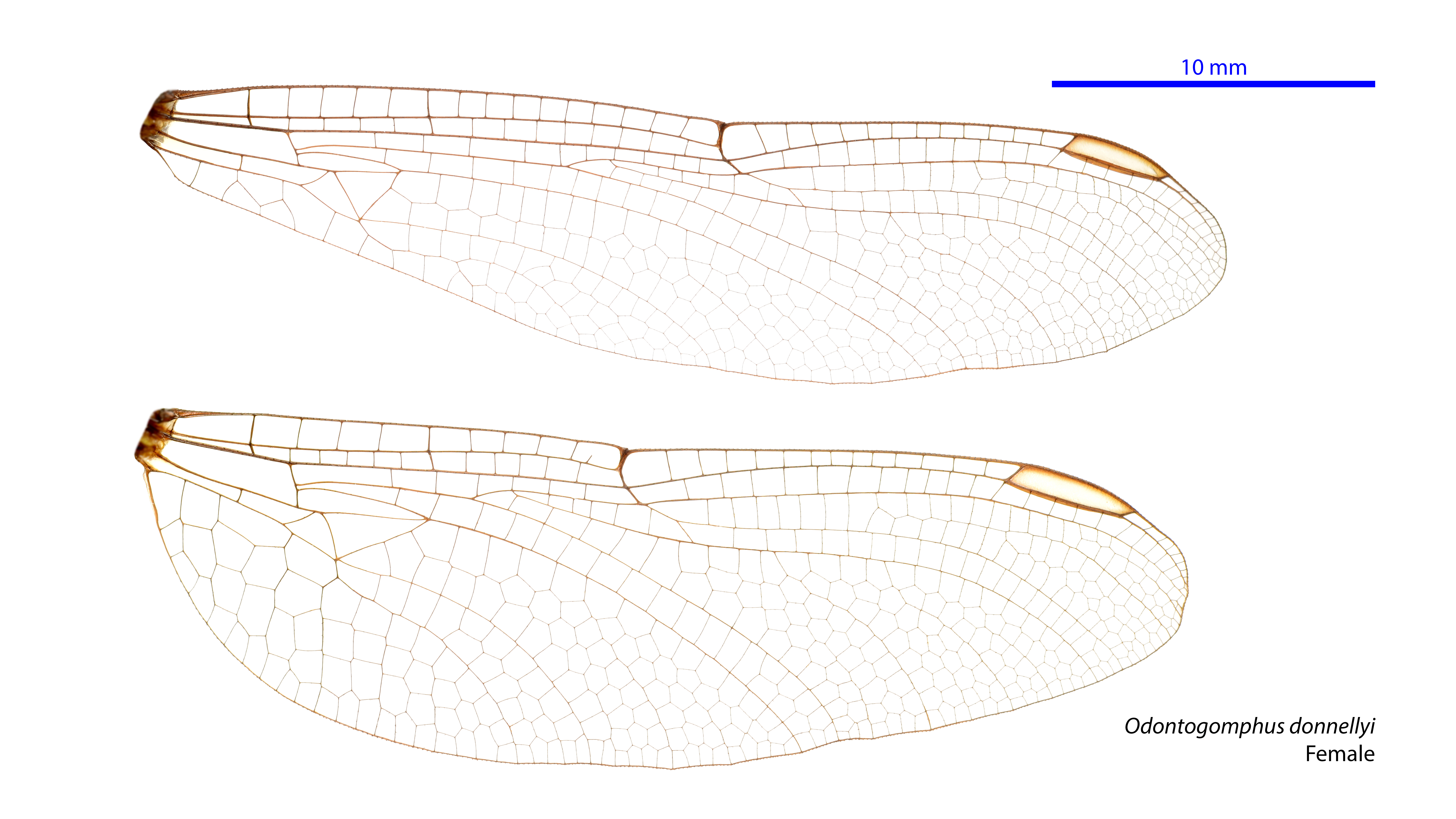
Female wings

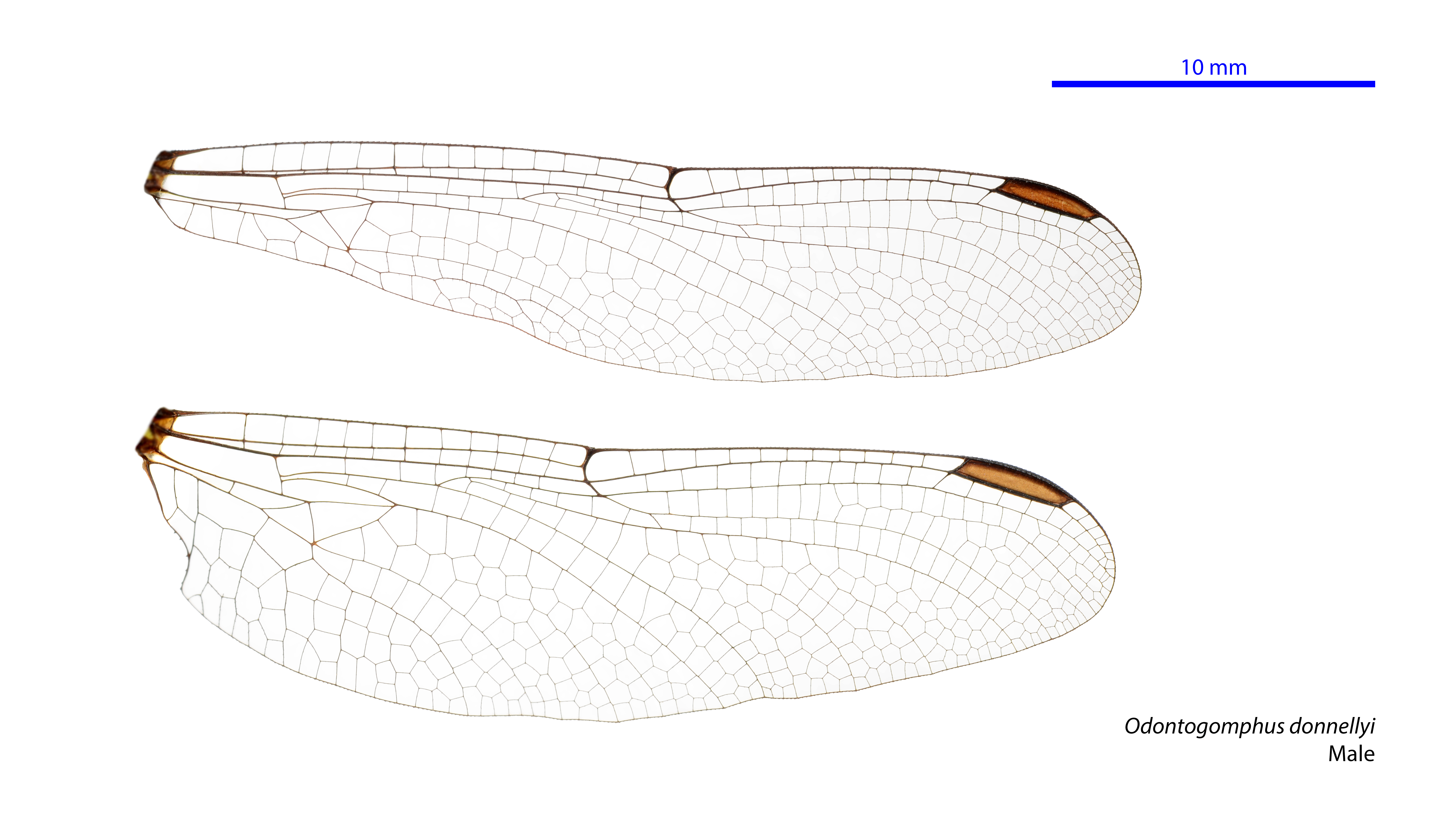
Male wings

== See also ==
- List of Odonata species of Australia
