= 1978 – A Teen Night Out =

- Theatrical Release Poster
- 1978 A Teen Night Out
- Directed by: Aziz Zee
- Written by: Mohit Shrivastav
- Produced by: Kunal Shamshere Malla; Suresh Thomas
- Starring: Yash Rajpara; Apurva Godbole; Gaurav Sharma; Vaishnavi Kadam; Rishabh Raj; Muskaan Tomar; Sunny Yadav; Rohit Mugullu; Maliha Malla; Sonyaa Twinks; Abuzar Akhtar
- Production companies: KSM Film Productions; Crescendo Films
- Distributed by: Lav Singh
- Release date: 3 May 2019
- Country: India

1978 – A Teen Night Out is a 2019 Indian Bollywood film, directed by Aziz Zee, produced by Kunal Shamshere Malla and Suresh Thomas, and co-produced by Manesha Chatarji, presented by Theatre King. The film features the TV actress Sonyaa and playback singer Abuzar Akhtar.

== Plot ==
A Teen Night Out is a racy, supernatural, terrifying, suspense story of a NIGHT OUT at a film studio by a group of teens based in 1978. The film follows seven teenagers who find their lives in jeopardy after getting trapped in a haunted mansion.

== Cast ==
- Yash Rajpara
- Apurva Godbole
- Gaurav Sharma
- Vaishnavi Kadam
- Rishabh Raj
- Muskaan Tomar
- Sunny Yadav
- Rohit Mugallu
- Maliha Malla
- Sonyaa Twinks
- Abuzar Akhtar
- Rishabh raj
