= Thomas Wallace Donnelly =

American Entomologist (Odonatologist)

Thomas Wallace "Nick" Donnelly (23 December 1932 - 7 May 2025). was an American odonatologist and geologist. He obtained a BSc in Geology at Cornell University and went on to complete a Master’s degree at California Institute of Technology. Finally, he obtained his PhD from Princeton University. His dissertation described the geology of Saint Thomas and Saint John in the American Virgin Islands. After completing his PhD he taught at Rice University for seven years. From 1966 until his retirement in 1996, Donnelly worked at Binghamton University.

== Work in Odonatology ==
Donnelly began publishing on dragonflies in the 1960s. Throughout his life, Donnelly described four new Damselfly genera including two within Coenagrionidae (Enacantha and Melanobasis) and two within Isostictidae (Cnemisticta and Titanosticta). He also described a number of new Odonata species including nine Gomphidae and six Platystictidae. In total, Donnelly described 65 new odonate species.

Donnelly was also a founding member of the Dragonfly Society of the Americas and served as president and interim editor for their quarterly newsletter, Argia. It was in Argia that Donnelly first announced the dot-map project, which aimed to map the distribution of odonate species across the United States of America. Subsequently, he published his observations in a three part series. This initiative also helped spark the creation of Odonata Central, a citizen science inniative focused on expanding understanding of odonate distribution, biogeography, biodiversity and identification in North America

== Odonate Species Named in his Honour ==
- Argia donnellyi Garrison & von Ellenrieder, 2015
- Cora chirripa donnellyi Bick & Bick, 1990
- Drepanoneura donnellyi von Ellenrieder & Garrison, 2008
- Epigomphus donnellyi González-Soriano & Cook, 1988
- Hemicordulia tenera donnellyi Kosterin, Karube & Futahashi, 2015
- Odontogomphus donnellyi Watson, 1991

== Books ==
Donnelly, T.W., 1970. The Odonata of Dominica British West Indies. Washington
