= Daniel-Ryan Spaulding =

Canadian comedian

Daniel-Ryan Spaulding is a Canadian comedian.

== Early life and education ==
Spaulding was born in Burnaby, British Columbia, and grew up in a suburb of Vancouver attending public schools that emphasized anti-bullying. He majored in theater at Queen's University at Kingston, and first performed standup comedy at age 23 at a gay bar in Vancouver.

== Career ==
Spaulding's 2014 video "If Gay Guys Said the Stuff Straight People Say..." gained over 2 million views on YouTube, exposing microaggressions and straight privilege. The HuffPost praised the video's "brilliant" lines including "Ugh! That's so straight!" and ran a second piece when Spaulding released a followup video. While living in Amsterdam, Spaulding created over 130 episodes of a video series called "It's Berlin" in which he delved into the psychology of Berliners. Lola magazine described Spaulding as "one of Berlin's iconic personalities".

Spaulding's 2023 video "Birthday & New Beginnings After Gastric Sleeve Surgery!" marked his foray into working as a health and wellness content creator.

Spaulding performed his one-man show "Power Gay" at the 2023 Edinburgh Fringe's Just the Tonic at the Caves, in Europe and Tel Aviv, and at New York City's Redeye.

=== Politics ===
In late 2023, Spaulding gained attention for his pro-Israel activism, when his video about the October 7 attacks gained over 9 million views on social media.

== Personal life ==
Spaulding lost over 200 pounds (91 kilograms) after achieving sobriety and having gastric sleeve surgery in 2022. He also underwent a hair transplant in Turkey.
