= Black Dutch (genealogy) =

Polyphyletic ethnonym in the United States

Black Dutch is a term with several different meanings in United States dialect and slang. It generally refers to racial, ethnic or cultural roots. Its meaning varies and such differences are contingent upon time and place. Several varied groups of multiracial people have sometimes been referred to as or identified as Black Dutch, most often as a reference to their ancestors. The Dictionary of American Regional English defined black Dutch as "A dark-complexioned people of uncertain origin."

Genealogist and journalist James Pylant wrote that "a blanket definition cannot be given for every American family claiming descent from the Black Dutch." Common interpretations of Black Dutch ancestry include Jewish, Spanish Dutch, Dutch Indonesian, Native American, Mulatto, Sub-Saharan African, and others.

Jimmie H. Crane wrote in 2006 that term Black Dutch appears to have become widely adopted in the Southern Highlands and as far west as Texas in the early 19th century by certain Southeastern families of mixed race ancestry, especially those of Native American descent. When used in the South, it usually did not imply West or Central African admixture, although some families who used the term were of tri-racial descent.

In addition, some mixed-race persons of European and West or Central African descent identified as Portuguese or Native American, as a way to explain their variations in physical appearance from Europeans and to be more easily accepted by European-American neighbors. By the late 18th century, numerous free mixed-race families were migrating west, along with white Americans, to the frontiers of Virginia and North Carolina, where racial castes were less strict than in the plantation country of the Tidewater.

== Melungeon ==
Late 20th-century research by Paul Heinegg found that 80 percent of people listed as free people of color in North Carolina censuses from 1790–1810 could be traced back to free Black people in Virginia in colonial times. Based on his research, he found that most such free Black families before the American Revolution were descended from unions in the working class – between white women (whose status made their children free by the principle of partus sequitur ventrem) and African men: free, indentured servants and slaves. Since the late 20th century, DNA tests of people from core Melungeon families, as documented in the Melungeon DNA Project coordinated by Jack Goins, have shown most individuals are of European and African descent, rather than Native American ancestry. This is a confirmation of Heinegg's genealogical research, summarized in his Free African Americans in Virginia, North Carolina, South Carolina, Maryland and Delaware (1995–2005).

== Native Americans passing for white ==
James Pylant wrote: "While there were instances of Black Dutch being used to disguise African ancestry in white families, the oft-circulated claims of Native Americans' widepreading camouflaging as Black Dutch is disputed by Larry Echo Hawk, Assistant Secretary of Indian Affairs, who found no such evidence."

As early as the 18th century, ethnic Germans and Irish/Scots-Irish migrated from Pennsylvania into Virginia through the Shenandoah Valley and settled in the backcountry of the Appalachian Mountains, areas considered the frontier compared to Tidewater Virginia and the Low Country of the coast. They likely continued to use their term of "Black Dutch" to refer to swarthy-skinned people or, more generally, political opponents. Historically, mixed-race European-Native American and sometimes full blood Native American families of the South adopted the term "Black Dutch" for their own use, and to a lesser extent, "Black Irish," first in Virginia, North Carolina, and Tennessee. As the researcher Paul Heinegg noted, the frontier was also the area of settlement of mixed-race families of African and European ancestry, who also used the terms.

Crane theorized that people might have attempted to "pass" and avoid being removed to Indian Territory or stigmatized by what became a majority Anglo-American society. Some Native Americans, mainly from the Five Civilized Tribes of the Southeast, claimed "Black Dutch" or "Black Irish" heritage in order to purchase land in areas which United States treaties and other laws had reserved for people of European descent. Once they owned the land, such families who had escaped forced removal would not admit to their Native American heritage, for fear of losing their property.

== Black Dutch in the Midwest and Deep South ==
Over time, Crane wrote, the term "Black Dutch" migrated with certain families of mixed ancestry from North Carolina, Kentucky, and Tennessee to Missouri and Arkansas, as well as to Mississippi, Alabama, Texas, and Oklahoma, where its original meaning became lost. Many people born in the 20th century have claimed Black Dutch heritage, sometimes in addition to Native heritage. Unlike families in Pennsylvania or Virginia, most of the mixed-race Black Dutch families of the Deep South have English, Scots, or Irish surnames, and have no German ancestry in their families, Crane wrote.

== See also ==
- Melungeon
- Black Irish
- Ramapo Mountain People
- Jersey Dutch
