= The Black Donnellys =

2007 American drama series

- Genre: Drama
- Created by: Paul Haggis; Robert Moresco
- Developed by: Scott Corwon; Paul Haggis
- Starring: Jonathan Tucker; Thomas Guiry; Olivia Wilde; Billy Lush; Michael Stahl-David; Kirk Acevedo; Keith Nobbs; Kate Mulgrew; Peter Greene; Michael Rispoli; Kevin Conway
- Country of origin: United States
- Original language: English
- No. of seasons: 1
- No. of episodes: 13 (7 aired online)

Production
- Executive producers: Paul Haggis; Robert Moresco
- Running time: 46 minutes
- Production companies: Blackfriars Bridge; NBC Universal Television Studio; IMPACTS Entertainment

Original release
- Network: NBC
- Release: February 26 – May 14, 2007

The Black Donnellys is an American drama television series that debuted on NBC on February 26, 2007, and last aired on May 14, 2007. The Black Donnellys was created by Paul Haggis and Robert Moresco, and stars Jonathan Tucker, Olivia Wilde, Billy Lush, Tom Guiry, Kirk Acevedo, Michael Stahl-David, and Keith Nobbs.

The series follows four young Roman Catholic Irish-American brothers in New York City's Hell's Kitchen neighborhood and their involvement with petty and organized crime, specifically the Irish Mob. Set in the present day, the show draws heavily upon Irish-American history and themes of family and loyalty. The pilot episode illustrates a clear tension and rivalry between Irish and Italians. The episodes are narrated by a childhood friend, Joey "Ice Cream", whom the show depicts as an unreliable narrator.

In creating the show, Haggis, a native of London, Ontario, strongly referenced his hometown's local history about the real-life Black Donnellys and the massacre associated with their name. In the pilot episode, Joey says the neighborhood is populated primarily by "Black Irish", whom he calls "a race of dark-haired people" the Celts had failed to wipe out in Ireland. The series portrays Hell's Kitchen as a traditionally working-class neighborhood with a deeply entrenched ethnic Irish population and an Irish Mob with control over illegal gambling and loansharking, and heavy involvement in the unions.

On April 9, 2007, the show was pulled from NBC’s primetime line-up. On April 14, the series was officially cancelled, but the remainder of the episodes were made available on the NBC website and on iTunes. On June 5, 2007, it was announced that HDNet had acquired the rights from NBC Universal to broadcast all 13 episodes of the series, beginning June 13, 2007. A DVD collection entitled "The Black Donnellys: The Complete Series" was released on September 4, 2007.

== Characters ==
- Thomas "Tommy" Donnelly (Jonathan Tucker) – Tommy is the second oldest brother in the Donnelly family. He is known to step up as the leader of the four brothers and often cleans up his brothers' trouble-making messes. His care-taking nature stems from an incident in childhood when he ran over his brother Jimmy's leg after stealing a car. He promised God that if Jimmy walked again, he, Tommy, would take care of him thereafter. Tommy wants to become an artist, and has been going to art school. Huey Farrell, the boss of the Irish Mob, had been paying for his tuition. When Huey dies, the money is revoked by Huey's brother Dokey Farrell, who suspects Tommy of killing his brother. Tommy is in love with Jenny Reilly, a childhood friend with whom he has a complicated and strained relationship. He struggles between taking care of his family and doing what he wants.
- James "Jimmy" Donnelly (Tom Guiry) – The oldest of 4 brothers, Jimmy is a troublemaker and drug user, often involved in criminal activity, and known for making stupid decisions. He walks with a permanent limp, incurred when a speeding, runaway car crushed his leg, when he was young. (Jimmy does not know who was driving the car; only Joey Ice Cream and Tommy know that it was actually little Tommy.) Jimmy believes he should be the leader of the Donnelly brothers, but his constant temper flare-ups cause people to believe him incapable of leadership, so they follow Tommy. This constant battle for being in charge causes friction between the two brothers throughout the season.
- Jenny Reilly (Olivia Wilde) – A childhood friend of Tommy and rest of the Donnelly boys', Jenny runs a local diner with her father. She and Tommy have a complicated and strained relationship. Jenny married a schoolteacher who, unbeknownst to her, stole from drug dealers to pay his student loans and ended up stuffed in an oil drum. No one has the heart to tell Jenny.
- Kevin Donnelly (Billy Lush) – Kevin is the second youngest of the Donnelly brothers. He is a gambler whose gut instincts are extremely lucky. The problem is, he never follows his gut. He doubts every bet that he makes, and therefore loses every bet except one: the only bet he has won in his entire life occurred the day before his father died, when he asked Kevin to pick a horse to bet on in a horse race. The horse won, and as it was the last thing his father did with him, it caused Kevin to believe he is lucky. His gambling debt to Louie Downtown created the chain of events that lead to the season finale. Kevin is often caught between helping Tommy and Jimmy. He is very loyal to his brothers and is much more of a follower than a leader.
- Sean "Seanny" Donnelly (Michael Stahl-David) – Seanny is the youngest of the brothers and is noted for his popularity with women. In the season premiere, Sean is severely beaten by Nicky Cottero in reaction to Jimmy's kidnapping of Louie Downtown. Sean would like to help his brothers with "business", but they try to keep him out of the loop to keep him safe.
- Nicky Cottero (Kirk Acevedo) – Nicky is an Italian gangster currently attempting to take over the area formerly controlled by his mentor, Sal. He befriends the Donnellys to try to take down both Dokey and Alo.

Kate Mulgrew as Helen Donnelly.

- Joey "Ice Cream" (Keith Nobbs) – Joey is the jailhouse narrator and a lifelong friend of the brothers. He is typically willing to help them out in their times of need. Something of a Scheherezade figure, he is a classic example of an unreliable narrator, revising his story frequently when called on iffy details.
- Helen Donnelly (Kate Mulgrew) – Helen is the Donnelly brothers' widowed mother. She watches out the most for young Sean, but she fiercely defends all her sons and turns a blind eye to their acts of revenge. While the boys feel she needs protecting, she gives hints of being much more capable and streetwise than they would ever guess.
- Derek Timothy "Dokey" Farrell (Peter Greene) – Dokey is an Irish gangster who controls his deceased older brother's turf. He gained the nickname Dokey while growing up and being reportedly "The King of the Hokey Pokey" = "Hokey-Pokey Dokey". He is known for carrying an axe and chopping off people's toes. He wants more than anything to gain the prestige and respect his brother had, but has trouble putting up with the aggression of the Italians and the wayward ways of the Donnellys.
- Al "Alo" Onatero (Michael Rispoli) – Alo is the boss of the Italian mob.
- Ian Reilly (Kevin Conway) – Jenny's father.
- Robert "Bobby" Donnelly (John Bolger) – Bobby is the Donnelly brothers' deceased father. He and Huey were the bosses of the Irish neighborhood when the Donnelly brothers were kids, though Bobby was the head of the union local, a position that earned significant respect for himself and his family.
- Terrance "Whitey" Waylon (Kevin Corrigan) – Whitey is Bob the Mouth's nephew and Jimmy's business partner. Jimmy stabs him to death after discovering Whitey has been sleeping with Joanie and out of fear that he may have given up information to the police or Dokey.
- Samson Dawlish (James Badge Dale) – A suitor of Jenny's who becomes obsessed. He works for a delivery service that serves Reilly's diner, and makes a point of delivering extra food for Jenny free of charge.
- Hugh William "Huey" Farrell (Chris Bauer) – Huey is an Irish gangster who formerly controlled the Irish neighborhood. He was killed in the pilot episode.
- Louie Downtown (Joe D'Onofrio) – Louie Downtown is a low level bookie who doesn't mean anything to anyone, except that he's the nephew of the Italian mob boss Sal Minetta. Louie is kidnapped by Jimmy, Kevin, and Sean because Kevin owes him money. They hold Louie for ransom to the Italians, but when the Italians discover the Donnelly brothers are behind the kidnapping, Nicky Cottero severely beats Sean. In response to the attack, Jimmy shoots Louie to death.
- Joanie (Betsy Beutler) – Joanie is Jimmy's drug addicted girlfriend. She seems to want a better life for herself and Jimmy but frequently backslides. She cheats on Jimmy with Whitey. When Jimmy finds out, he kills Whitey.
- Nadine (Jamie Bonelli) – Nadine is Sean's love interest. She met Sean while selling him and Jimmy a jukebox for The Firecracker. She is helping Sean study for his GED.
- Robert "Bob the Mouth" Kelly (Peter Gerety) – Bob is a neighborhood bookie and Terrance "Whitey" Waylon's uncle. He frequently "solves" his problems with a grill iron. Jimmy owes him money through Whitey.
- Councilman Jack Trevor (Tom Mason) – Jack is the neighborhood's representative in the New York City Council. He is originally from the neighborhood and was cozy with Huey and Bobby Donnelly back in the day. He helped orchestrate Sal and Huey's real estate scheme and is having an affair with his chief of staff, Trish Hughes.
- Detective Frank Stein (Ned Eisenberg) – Frank is a NYPD detective at the 28th Precinct. He arrests Jimmy for armed robbery in the pilot episode and is tasked with the Huey-Sal homicide case in the following episode. Unlike his colleague, Det. Geckel, he is not on Dokey's payroll, and it is implied he has been trying to build a case against the Irish Mob for a long time.

== Cast ==
=== Main ===
- Jonathan Tucker as Thomas "Tommy" Donnelly
- Tom Guiry as James "Jimmy" Donnelly
- Billy Lush as Kevin Donnelly
- Michael Stahl-David as Sean "Seanny" Donnelly
- Olivia Wilde as Jenny Reilly
- Keith Nobbs as Joey Ice Cream
- Kirk Acevedo as Nicky Cottero
- Peter Greene as Derek "Dokey" Farrell

=== Recurring ===
- Kate Mulgrew as Helen Donnelly
- Michael Rispoli as Al "Alo" Onatero
- Chris Bauer as Hugh "Huey" Farrell
- Molly Schaffer as Kate Farrell
- Seamus Davey-Fitzpatrick as Matthew Farrell
- Betsy Beutler as Joanie
- Kevin Conway as Ian Reilly
- James Badge Dale as Samson Dawlish
- Kevin Corrigan as Whitey
- Jamie Bonelli as Nadine
- Chris Kipiniak as Sharkey
- Peter Gerety as Bob the Mouth
- Brian Tarantina as Vinnie Culiari
- Patrick Brennan as Earl
- Lauren Bittner as Mary Ann Maxwell
- Elizabeth Gillies as Young Jenny

== Production ==
Producer Bobby Moresco conceived of the series as inspired from his experiences growing up in New York's Hell's Kitchen. Co-creator Paul Haggis also wanted to reference the real-life Black Donnellys, an Irish family from Lucan near his hometown of London, Ontario who were murdered in the 1800s because of ongoing feuds with local residents. Said Haggis, “This black Irish family of low-lifes and criminals was purportedly murdered by a community of good Protestant folks, and everyone covered it up. There were elements of that that I really wanted to be able to infuse into this story, and I think as we wrote, the tragedy of these characters started to bubble up, and more similarities started to come." EZ Streets, a short-lived series Haggis and Moresco had created in 1996, also centered on mob activity and explored similar themes. Haggis and Moresco began developing the idea for The Black Donnellys prior to EZ Streets' cancellation, but did not begin to work on the show until March 2006, when their film Crash became nominated for Oscars and they received offers to produce the series.

Of the series' Hell's Kitchen setting, Haggis said "we decided to create a fictional neighborhood, and you’ll see that we have elements of Manhattan, Queens, and Brooklyn, and made it all look like one neighborhood. That seems very similar to what we did with EZ Street in which we took portions in Detroit and Chicago and L.A., and made a city that you couldn’t recognize."

== Broadcast ==
The series was originally set to debut as part of NBC's fall 2006 primetime lineup, but was delayed to January 2007 to relieve ER during its hiatus. ER's fall 2006 ratings proved to be so successful that NBC decided to scrap the hiatus, and The Black Donnellys was subsequently pushed to March 2007. When Studio 60 on the Sunset Strip was put on hiatus due to faltering ratings, The Black Donnellys premiered as its mid-season replacement in February 2007.

== Episodes ==
No.	Title	Directed by	Written by	Original release date	U.S. viewers (millions)
1	"Pilot"	Paul Haggis	Paul Haggis & Robert Moresco	February 26, 2007	8.4
Tommy, the Donnellys' only honest man, has to make a difficult choice — fight for his family or turn his back on them and keep to the straight and narrow – as he becomes embroiled in a plot hatched by his brother Jimmy to help out his brother Kevin. Kevin owes money to the wrong guys, and Jimmy tries to pay it off for him by abducting his bookie. Nicky Cottero, working for mob boss Sal takes matters into his own hands, leading to drastic consequences for the Donnelly brothers.
2	"A Stone of the Heart"	Paul Haggis	Kim Clements & Paul Haggis	March 5, 2007	6.9
As Sean's fate becomes clear to the Donnelly siblings, an antsy Jimmy stews in a holding cell. Meanwhile, an unsettled Tommy finds comfort in Jenny as their friendship begins to morph into something more serious. Nicky grasps control of the Italian mob.
3	"God Is a Comedian Playing to an Audience Afraid to Laugh"	Dan Lerner	Robert Moresco & Jeff F. King	March 5, 2007	N/A
Kevin's attempts various ways to bail Jimmy out of jail, despite Tommy's protests. Meanwhile, due to a shortage of beds, Sean is moved out of ICU and Tommy desperately needs to find a way to get his brother back in. Dokey, Alo and Nicky come close to a confrontation. This episode was deemed too "intense" for network TV and was instead made available to watch on NBC.com.
4	"The World Will Break Your Heart"	Deran Sarafian	Bob Lowry & Kim Clements	March 12, 2007	6.5
Tommy is plagued with guilt when Kate, widow of Irish mob kingpin Huey, asks him to host her slain husband's wake. Meanwhile, Kevin and Joey go on a quest to find booze for the wake; Huey's brother Dokey begins to suspect that drug-addled Jimmy may be his sibling's killer.
5	"Lies"	Gloria Muzio	Sean Whitesell	March 19, 2007	5.5
Tommy realizes the Italian's new mob boss Nicky Cottero means business on collecting his debt when he threatens the boy's mother, Helen. After exhausting all options, Tommy takes Dokey's bribe and while visiting Huey's widow, steals a box that Dokey wants. Jimmy and Joey Ice Cream find the former Louie Downtown's cellphone and, after realizing he was running a gambling circuit, start to collect on his payments. Sean finally comes home from the hospital while Jenny wakes up after sleeping with Samson and gets blown off by Tommy when she tries to explain.
6	"Run Like Hell"	Ed Sherin	Laurie Hutzler & Gary Lennon	March 26, 2007	5.4
Tommy gets pulled into Jimmy and Kevin's bookmaking action when he realizes the guy about to get busted for not paying is his friend Maxwell. When Tommy decides to track the money down himself, he gets played by his friend and ultimately ends up doing the busting. As Jimmy has Kevin toss Louie Downtown's phone, we meet Whitey who helps him transfer the numbers — but a flash into the future shows this relationship is headed for trouble. Jenny discovers her father's medical condition when the diner deposits never make it to the bank.
7	"The Only Thing Sure"	David Straiton	Allan Steele	April 2, 2007	5.3
Tommy and Jimmy have a role-reversal when it's Jimmy who's painting the bar and protecting Sean from the business. Meanwhile, Tommy is collecting on payments with Kevin. A flashback to Kevin's childhood shows why he believes he's truly lucky as a gambler. Jenny struggles to maintain the family's diner and watch over her ailing father.
8	"In Each One a Savior"	Anthony Hemingway	Rafael Alvarez & Mick Betancourt	April 9, 2007	N/A
While Tommy helps a woman who wants to evict drug dealers from her building, he discovers that this simple thing is much more complicated than he thought. Meanwhile, Jimmy continues his attempts to take over the neighborhood and stoops to a new low when he demands payment from Jenny. During the meantime, Nicky finds out what really happened to Louie Downtown.
9	"All of Us Are in the Gutter"	TJ Scott	Alissa Haggis & Amanda Moresco	April 16, 2007	N/A
Tommy is finally able to do the only thing he wants to do, art. With the help of Kate, he gets a job at an art studio. But when he thinks he's now able to separate himself from the "business" of his family, he learns that it won't happen. Nicky, who decided not to kill Kevin, wants to use Louie Downtown's cell phone and offers a partnership to the Donnellys but will only deal with Tommy.
10	"When the Door Opens"	Jeff F. King	Robert Moresco	April 23, 2007	N/A
Things go horribly wrong for the Donnellys when their loyalty is put to the test.
11	"Wasn't That Enough?"	Kevin Bray	Alissa Haggis & Amanda Moresco	April 30, 2007	N/A
Tommy helps the Reillys after their diner is put up for eviction. Tommy and Kevin find out more about their father's past and how he died.
12	"The Black Drop"	Dan Minahan	Paul Haggis & Sean Whitesell	May 7, 2007	N/A
Tommy finishes helping out the Reilly's get their eviction overturned. Meanwhile, he learns more about who killed his father. Jimmy tries to deal with Dokey on his own.
13	"Easy Is the Way"	Robert Moresco	Paul Haggis & Sean Whitesell	May 14, 2007	N/A
Tommy tries to get his family and run away, before Dokey gets to them, but Jimmy has different plans for Dokey. Jenny ends the threats from Samson once and for all.

== Critical reception ==
Critics had praise for the cast and the pilot episode in particular. Troy Patterson of Slate wrote, "The next four episodes are nowhere near as patient and controlled as that cinematic pilot, but, man, are they Irish: the wakes, the neon shamrock, the epigraphs from W.B. Yeats and D.P. Moynihan. And the show keeps this magnificent blarney up even as it swipes half its ideas from the playbooks of Scorsese and The Godfather." In Slant Magazine, Emily St. James wrote, "It’s not horribly original stuff, but on basic network television, where the same handful of shots seems to turn up on every show, it feels strikingly fresh." John Leonard of New York called it "accomplished and absorbing television".

Criticism was directed at the storytelling and characters, which some described as heavy-handed and too reliant on Irish-American clichés. Writing for Salon, Heather Havrilevsky said "while The Sopranos and Brotherhood make [drama series about organized crime] look easy, The Black Donnellys makes it excruciatingly clear just how difficult it is to tell a soulful story about criminals", adding that among the series’ flaws are its "attempts to make crime seem sort of romantic and cool." Others said the Donnelly brothers were not believable as Irish-American mobsters, with Matthew Gilbert of The Boston Globe likening the show to "a network version of The Sopranos with pretty boys". The Los Angeles Times' Paul Brownfield likened the depiction of Hell's Kitchen to "Scorsese's Creek" and the New York Post's Linda Stasi said it felt anachronistic.

Tim Goodman of the San Francisco Chronicle said, "It may be that what Moresco and Haggis are after here is a coming-of-age story about how the best intentions of life must take a backseat to family loyalty. But there's so much amiss here in the tone it's hard to tell...It's clear that 'The Black Donnellys' doesn't know what it wants to be. It's damning enough that the show isn't 'The Sopranos' or 'Brotherhood' or even 'EZ Streets.' But until it figures what play to make -- dumb-luck Irish clan struggles to get out of troubles of its own making or young mob family forced to find its way -- viewers won't know what to make of it."

Jonathan Tucker’s performance received praise, with Maureen Ryan of the Chicago Tribune saying he "manages to give the lead brother, Tommy, a compellingly mournful aura despite the show’s thin writing" and Gilbert commenting he makes "Tommy's moral struggle palpable". Gilbert added, "As the temperamental brother Jimmy, who undoes any peace that Tommy builds in the neighborhood, Tom Guiry has a Sean Penn-like intensity."

On review aggregator Rotten Tomatoes, season 1 has an approval rating of 40% based on 30 reviews. The site’s critics consensus reads, "The Black Donnellys has Irish swagger to spare and an appealing cast, but the series' overreliance on signature tropes of better mob stories only underscores its lack of authenticity and imagination."

== Home media ==
The Black Donnellys: The Complete Series was released on DVD on September 4, 2007. The set contains all 13 episodes, including the 7 unaired episodes.

== International broadcasters ==
Country	TV Network(s)	Series Premiere	Weekly Schedule
United States	NBC	February 26, 2007	Mondays, 10 pm
Canada	Global Television Network	February 26, 2007	Sundays, 10 pm Mondays, 10 pm
Finland	Canal+, Sub	September 2, 2007	Mondays, 11 pm
Germany	TNT Serie	September 5, 2007	Wednesdays, 8:15 pm
Ireland	RTÉ Two	August 14, 2007	Tuesdays, 11:20 pm
United Kingdom	ITV2 (part of XXL Thursday)	September 27, 2007	Thursdays, 11 pm (originally 9 pm)
Spain	Canal+, Calle 13 and MTV Spain	October 11, 2007	Thursdays, 9:30 pm
Mexico	AXN	November 5, 2007	Mondays, 8:00 pm
Argentina	AXN	November 6, 2007	Tuesday, 8:00 pm
Brazil	AXN	November 6, 2007	Tuesday, 9:00 pm
Peru	AXN	November 6, 2007	Tuesday, 8:00 pm
Thailand	Star World	2007	Sundays, 9 pm (THAI/WIB)
Slovenia	POP TV	January 2, 2008	Wednesday, 10:45 pm
Australia	Showcase	May 21, 2008	Wednesday, 9:30 pm
Portugal	Fox Crime; TVI	May 2008	Wednesdays
Sweden	Kanal 5	June 1, 2008	Sunday, 9:55 pm
Chile	MEGA, AXN	June 23, 2008	Monday, 1:30 am
Italy	Italia1	September 8, 2008	Sunday, 12:35 am
Russia	The Star	October 13, 2008	Monday-Thursday, 10:40 pm
India	Star World	November 2008	
New Zealand	C4	December 29, 2008	Monday, 8:30 pm
Hungary	TV2, Viasat6	January 7, 2009	Wednesdays, after 11:00 pm
Belgium	Canvas	March 23, 2009	Mondays, 11:45 pm
Belgium	La Deux	May 2010	Sundays, 8:30 pm
Netherlands	RTL 7	April 10, 2009	Fridays, 9:25 pm
Croatia	Nova TV	November 5, 2009	Monday-Thursday, 1:20 am
Greece	Alter Channel	April 2010	Saturday-Sunday, 3:00 am
