= Ravi Kapoor =

British actor of Indian heritage (born 1969)

- Born: 27 June 1969 (age 56); Liverpool, England
- Occupations: Actor; Director; Writer; Producer
- Years active: 1992 – present
- Spouse: Meera Simhan

Ravi Kapoor (born 27 June 1969) is a British actor and filmmaker. He is known for his roles in the ABC series Gideon's Crossing (2000–2001) and the NBC series Crossing Jordan (2001–2007). He directed the films Miss India America (2015) and Four Samosas (2022).

Kapoor has worked in both the United Kingdom and the United States.

== Early and personal life ==
Kapoor was born in Liverpool and is of Punjabi Indian heritage. He trained at East 15 Acting School. Kapoor is married to actress Meera Simhan.

== Filmography ==
=== Film ===
- 1992: Wild West – Ali Ayub
- 1997: Bribery and Corruption – Detective Sergeant Kahn
- 2009: World Cupp 2011 – Ravi Indulkar
- 2012: Flight – Dr. Kenan
- 2018: Book Club – Dr. Kapoor
- 2021: The Starling – Dr. Manmohan
- 2022: Four Samosas – Priest
- 2023: Family Switch – Mr.Hollis

=== Television ===
Ravi Kapoor television credits
Year	Title	Role	Notes	Ref.
1996	The Peacock Spring	Hem	TV movie	
2000–2001	Gideon's Crossing	Dr. Siddhartha "Sid" Shandar	20 episodes	
2001–2007	Crossing Jordan	Dr. Mahesh "Bug" Vijay	Regular role	
2008	My Name Is Earl	Indian Doctor	2 episodes	
2008	Numb3rs	Phil Sanjrani	1 episode	
2009	24	Muhtadi Gohar	3 episodes	
2009	Fringe	Dr. Nayak	1 episode	
2009	Grey's Anatomy	Sunder Atluri	1 episode	
2009	Heroes	Young Dr. Chandra Suresh	2 episodes	
2010	The Mentalist	Gupta	1 episode	
2014	NCIS	Bashir Malik	Episodes: "Kill Chain" & "Double Back"	
2015	The Young and the Restless	Dr. Samir Jain	1 episode	
2015	The Brink	PM Bashar	1 episode	
2018	Sharp Objects	Dr. Hafia	TV miniseries	
2019	The Good Doctor	Minesh Goyal	1 episode	
2019	Elementary	Dr. Garret Halsey	1 episode	

== Directing ==
- 2009: World Cupp 2011
- 2015: Miss India America
- 2022: Four Samosas
