= Keladi Kanmani (TV series) =

- Genre: Soap opera
- Written by: C. U. Muthuselvan; Ezhilarvardan (dialogues)
- Screenplay by: C.U.Muthuselvan; Devi Bala
- Story by: C.U.Muthuselvan; Devi Bala
- Directed by: O. N. Rathnam (1-332); P. Selvam (333-767)
- Creative director: Madhu Mohan
- Starring: Arnav; Divya Sridhar; Krithika Krishnan; Sadhana; Shefaali Shamili
- Theme music composer: Kiran
- Opening theme: "Akaya Ellai Neeye"
- Composer: K. Kiran Kumar
- Country of origin: India
- Original language: Tamil
- No. of seasons: 2
- No. of episodes: 767

Production
- Producer: Cine Times Entertainment
- Cinematography: Meenatchippatti P. Kasinathan
- Editors: Bala; Subash B. Vishwa
- Camera setup: Multi-camera
- Running time: approx. 20-22 minutes per episode
- Production company: Cine Times Entertainment

Original release
- Network: Sun TV
- Release: 6 April 2015 – 7 October 2017

Keladi Kanmani is a 2015 Indian Tamil-language soap opera starring Arnav, Divya Sridhar, Krithika Krishnan, Shefaali Shamili and Sadhana. It aired on Sun TV from 6 April 2015 to 7 October 2017 for 767 episodes. The series was produced by Cine Times Entertainment. Season 1 was directed by O. N. Rathnam and season 2 by P. Selvam.

== Plot ==
=== Season 1 ===
Bhavani has a mentally challenged daughter, Maya. Bavani's husband Nandakumar divorces her and marries another woman. Bhavani raises Maya alone with much difficulty. One day when Bhavani cannot solve all her problems, she commits suicide. To save her, Yugendran (also known as Yugi) comes and marries Maya. Yugi's mother does not accept Maya as her daughter-in-law as Maya is mentally challenged. Despite the rocky relationship and the problems between Yugi and Maya, their love was always unconditional. One day, the priest tells Bhavani, she will need to visit a holy place to do some prayers to make her daughter become a normal women. Bhavani would bring Maya to that place and do all the prayers.

The season comes to an end when Maya's mother sacrifices her life to god to make Maya a normal woman. When Maya wakes up, her mother will die. Maya will know nothing of her previous life when she awakens. She will be brought to the temple's leader Chidambaram's house and he will adopt her as his daughter. In there, she is renamed to Mahalakshmi and season 2 will begin.

=== Season 2 ===
A non-married girl Mahalakshmi is asked to walk around the village naked to fulfill the god's wishes. To save Maha from the embarrassment, Vijayan comes to the temple and marry Maha. Maha is now married and can no longer do the vows. Vijay's family has a curse from the snake. Whoever tries to marry Vijay or his sibling will die. But Maha is special, she has the power of the snake god. Vijay's father and older brother is unhappy about Vijay's decision on marrying the girl and will try to kill her. But, she escapes from their every attempts with help of Nagathamman. Meanwhile, Naagamanimaalai, an Icchadhari Snake enters into Vijay's family to take revenge. Here, now she reveals her past that She and her husband Aryan were Icchadhari Snakes and they were killed by Vijay's ancestor. Now, she comes again to take revenge on the family and wants to remarry her husband, as he is in form of Vijay at Present. Naagamanimaalai enters into Vijay's family as name of Nageshwari, who is Vijay's cousin. Later, Nagathamman, Snake goddess comes to Vijay's home to save that family from Nagamanimaalai. Finally, Naagathamman destroys Nageshwari's powers and turned her as a normal human being. Finally, She marries Jeyamani, Vijay's elder brother. Now, the new story line starts that Jeeva, who is exactly looks like Vijay. Jeeva is an IPS Officer of Narashingapuram, who wants to save the people from the Sena's family in that Village. Unfortunately, he died already. So, Vijay turns himself as Jeeva and solve the remaining problems that happens in the Village. Finally, Sena is shot by the police and Vijay joins with Maha and his family.

== Cast ==
=== Season 1: (Episodes 1–332) ===
- Krithika Krishnan as Maya Yugendran
- Sadhana as Bhavani: Maya's mother
- Arnav as Yugendran "Yugi"
- Puviarasu as Prakash, Maya's ex-love interest
- Sai Priyanka Ruth as Priyanka: Yugi's younger sister
- Shanthi Williams as Bhagyam: Yugi's mother
- Manikandan as Pratap: Priyanka's husband
- Jai Ram as Velu: Yugi's friend
- Preethi Kumar as Vaishali: Maya's step-sister
- M. Ramachanthiran as Nandakumar: Maya and Vaishu's father, Bhavani's ex-husband
- Sujatha Panju as Rekha: Nandu's second wife and Vaishu's mother
- Krithika Annamalai as Malathi Pachai: Yugi's elder sister
- Sukkiran as Pachaimuthu: Malathi's husband and Yugi's brother-in-law
- Joker Thulasi as Ethiraj: Pachai's father
- Bharath Guru as Dilli: Pachai's brother
- Reena as Shantha "SK" Kumari
- Sathiyasai as Bhargavi, nicknamed Kuttyma: Yugi's youngest sister
- Renuka as Malar: Bhavani's housemaid)
- Jacob Kevins as Gautham: Kuttymah's boyfriend
- Krishna Kishore as Inbha: Pratap's elder brother
- Mahalakshmi VJ as Varsha: Pratap's elder sister
- Jegan

=== Season 2: (Episodes 333–767) ===
==== Main cast ====
- Divya Sridhar (Episodes 545-767) as Maya alias Mahalakshmi "Maha" Vijayan
  - Krithika Krishnan (Episodes 1-333) as Maya (archival footage of season 1)
  - Shefaali Shamili (Episodes 333-525) as Maya alias Mahalakshmi "Maha" Vijayan (Replaced by Divya Sridhar)
- Arnav as Vijayan "Vijay"/ Aryagan "Arya" (Icchadhari Snake) and Jeeva IPS. Yugi's medium

==== Recurring cast ====
- Feroz khan as Jayamani (Vijay's Eldest Brother)
- Nancy Jennifer as Naga Manimalai, Fake Nageshwari "Eshwari", an Icchadhari snake, later turns a human form
- Sheela as Muthupechi: Vijay's mother
- Vineetha Shalini as Shalu: Vijay's Youngest Sister
- Jayalakshmi as Ambika: Vijay's Eldest Sister
- Gracy as Eshwari: Maha's adoptive Sister
- Vittal Rao as Chidambaram: Maha's adoptive Father
- Azhagu as Thillainayagam: Vijay's father
- Divya Ganesh as Chembaruthi: Jeyamani's ex-wife
- Geetha Ravishankar as Chembaruthi's mother
- Gayathri as Jeeva's mother
- Thilla as Bairavan
- Shyamili as Jeeva's love interest
- Gopi as Paarthaa
- Pandiaraj as Sena

== Original soundtrack ==
=== Title song ===
It was written by lyricist Yugabharathi, composed by the music director Kiran. It was sung by Chinmayi.

=== Soundtrack ===
Track listing
No.	Title	Lyrics	Singer(s)	Length
1.	"Akaya Ellai Neeye (ஆகாய எல்லை நீயே)"	Yugabharathi	Chinmayi	3:27

== See also ==
- List of programs broadcast by Sun TV
