= Meera Simhan =

English actress and screenwriter

Meera Simhan is an English film and stage actress and writer. She appeared in Date Movie (2006) and several television and stage productions. She had a recurring role in Anger Management in 2013 and 2014. She was born in England and is now based in Los Angeles. She is married to actor Ravi Kapoor.

She had a recurring role in The Flash.

Simhan's one-woman show, Miss India America was the basis of Kapoor's 2015 feature film directorial debut, Miss India America, for which she co-wrote the screenplay and had a supporting role. The film won Best Screenplay at the Los Angeles Asian Pacific Film Festival and the CAAM Fest Narrative Jury Award for Best Feature.

In 2022, she was cast in the ABC comedy pilot "The Son in Law" as the mother-in-law. It was ultimately not picked up.
