= University of Swahili =

University in Llano Bonito, Panama

University of Swahili Foundation
- Type: Foundation University
- Established: 2014
- Rector: Dr. Abdulmajeed Mohamad
- Director: Dr. Subramonian
- Location: Panama City, Panama
- Website: http://uos.university

University of Swahili Foundation is an Indo-American University in Llano Bonito, Panama. It comprises more than 70 departments and its main campus is in India.

== History ==
It was founded in Panama in 2014. The institute is registered with the Public Registry of Government of Panama, and is accredited by the INQAAHE, Spain (International Accrediting Organization) to provide accredited courses to local and overseas students up to Doctoral Level. The University of Swahili Foundation is the only research university that is legally registered in Panama by the Public Registry of the Government of Panama for higher education.

The university office was established in the Azuero Business Center to offer higher education courses. It is listed in the Department of Economic and Social Affairs, United Nations. It focuses on the priority areas of science, arts, fashion, technology and engineering, and communications technology, computer programming, automation and control and other major disciplines. The co-operation of the Panamanian Government, private sector and society allows the University of Swahili to maintain a state of the art academic offer.

== Curriculum ==
University of Swahili offers courses for higher education in PhD, D. Lit and D. Science for the following.

- Arts & Social Science
- Engineering & Applied Science
- Business & Management
- Computing & Information Technology
- Hospitality & Tourism Management
- Commerce
- Education
- Journalism & Mass Communication
- Public Health

== Admission ==
University of Swahili offers admissions to a range of research degree programs ranging from Ph.D. to D.Litt.

== Accreditation ==
The University is accredited by INQAAHE, Spain (International Accrediting Organization). Chartered Campus in India as this an Indo-American University. University of Swahili is accredited by the Public Registry of Government of Panama under Article 37 of Panama Foundation Law 25 of 1995. It award credentials as per article 8 of the charter of the foundation. University of Swahili, Panama is listed by Department of Economic and Social Affairs, United Nations. This is the only International Accrediting Organization recognised by all governments.
