= Sonal Shah (actress) =

American actress

- Born: Wheaton, Illinois, U.S.
- Occupations: Actress, voice artist
- Years active: 2004–present

Sonal Shah is an American actress and voice artist who may be best known for her recurring role as Dr. Sonja "Sunny" Dey on the series Scrubs.

== Early life and education ==
Shah was born and raised in Wheaton, Illinois. Her parents, Bhadresh and Mrudula Shah, are Gujarati Jains who moved from Mumbai, Maharashtra, India to the United States in 1970.

Shah graduated from Wheaton Warrenville South High School. She was named the 1998 DuPage County Fair Queen in July 1998.

Shah graduated cum laude from Loyola University in Chicago with a major in theatre, minors in psychology, biology and chemistry, and a concentration in pre-medicine. While a student at Loyola, Shah joined the Alpha Sigma Alpha sorority. "I sincerely planned to go to medical school," Shah told a Wheaton, Illinois newspaper in March 2009. "I love studying science, but I realized that my passion for performing outweighed my passion for wanting to be a doctor."

After graduation, Shah became a staple in the Chicago Theatre Community and performed with The Tony Award Winning Goodman Theatre among others. She is a founding member of Rasaka Theatre Company, which explores South Asian plays and playwrights, and supplemented her acting education at The Moscow Art Theatre School at Harvard University.

== Acting career ==
Shah moved to Los Angeles in 2006 and began appearing in commercials and sketch comedy. She also has acted with Second City theatres in Chicago and Los Angeles.

In 2009, Shah began appearing on Scrubs as Dr. Sonja "Sunny" Dey, who is one of the young interns newly cast in the show's eighth season. In addition, Shah appeared in the show's webisode series Scrubs: Interns. Shah returns as a guest star on the ninth season of Scrubs, in the fifth episode.

Shah also has a role in the 2009 teen comedy film Ratko: The Dictator's Son, a National Lampoon production.

== Selected filmography ==
Year	Title	Production	Role
2004	World of Weird	Short film	Jenny
2004	Homecoming	Short film	Mona
2006	The PTA	Unsold pilot	Waif
2007	Robot Love	Short film	Silver Robot
2009	Ratko: The Dictator's Son		Layla
2009	Scrubs: Interns	12 episodes	Sunny
2009	Scrubs	8 episodes	Sunny
2011	Losing Control Danger		
2011	The Old Leave Behind	Short film	Jess
2011	Snooze, Charlie	Short film	Charlie
2011	Sati Shaves Her Head	Short film	Sati
2011	Ek Bar Phir, Ek Saath Phir	Short film	Aishwarya
2012	The First Date	Short film	Amanda
2012	Incident on Marmont Avenue	Short film	Becca
2012	...Or Die	Short film	Parv's Friend
2012	Squad 85	3 episodes	Reporter
2013	Baby Mentalist	TV short	Reporter
2013	Back to School Night	Video short	Mrs. Patel
2013	Black Coffee	Short film	Ms. Flag
2013	Barrel 28	Short film	Veronica
2013	Reunion	Short film	Beth
2013	Straight Out of the Closet	TV movie	Alecia
2014	Bro	Short film	Olivia
2014	Transparent	1 episode	Female Student
2014	Spring Training	Short film	Kelly
2015	The Startup	1 episode	Sophie
2015	Miss India America		Volunteer 1
2015	Grace and Sumitra	Unsold pilot	Sumitra
2016	Showcase: One Network's Search for White Diversity	Video short	Network Executive
2016–2018	The Powerpuff Girls	3 episodes	Sapna (voice), Additional Voices
2016	New Girl	1 episode	Flight Attendant
2016	The Day Of	Short film	Chandra
2013	Anarkali Blossoms	Short film	Satya
2015	Limitless Love	Short film	Dr. Vicky
2016	Princess Rehab	Short film	Jamie
2017	Mike Boy		Darsha
2020	Definition Please		Dr. Ali
