= Sakthi (TV series) =

Sakthi Tamil serial

- சக்தி
- Genre: Soap opera Psychological thriller Romance; Drama
- Directed by: Sadhasivam Perumal 1-205
- Starring: Manesha Chatarji; Arnav Amjath; Fawaz Zayani; Manu Murali
- Theme music composer: Kiran
- Opening theme: "Devathai Naanaga"; Chinmayi (vocals); Yugabharathi (lyrics)
- Country of origin: India
- Original language: Tamil
- No. of seasons: 1
- No. of episodes: 205

Production
- Producer: S. Siddique
- Production locations: Tamil Nadu , Kerala
- Cinematography: Sudheer Babu; Raj Babu; Meenatchippatti P. Kasinathan
- Editor: Singai. V. Raju
- Camera setup: Multi-camera
- Running time: approx. 20-22 minutes per episode
- Production company: Cine Times Entertainment

Original release
- Network: Sun TV
- Release: 2 June 2014 – 27 March 2015

Related
- 10 Mani Kathaigal; Aathira; Dil Se Di Dua... Saubhagyavati Bhava?; Soubhagyavathy (Surya Tv)

Sakthi (Tamil: சக்தி) was a Tamil language soap opera on Sun TV. The show premiered on 2 June 2014. It was an adaptation of the Hindi serial Dil Se Di Dua... Saubhagyavati Bhava?. The show starred Manesha Chatarji and Arnav Amjath.

The show was produced by Cine Times Entertainment and directed by Sadhasivam Perumal. The show last aired on 27 March 2015. It had also aired in Sri Lanka on the Tamil channel Shakthi TV.

== Cast ==
- Manesha Chatarji as Shakthi
- Arnav Amjath as Arya
- Lalitha Patty as Patty
- Fawaz Zayani as Jeeva
- Manu Murali as Kumar
- Anuradha Krishnamoorthi as Logeshwari
- Aadarsh Nair as Prabhakar
- Aswini Achu as sub inspector of police, Anu
- Mohan Sharma as Rajagopal
- Arun Bhai as Peter
- Usha Sai as Saranya
- Yuvasri Lakshmi as Shakthi's sister

== Awards and honours ==
Year	Award	Category	Recipient	Role	Result
2014	Sun Kudumbam Awards	Sun Kudumbam Devathaigal Award	Manesha Chatarji	Shakthi	Won
2014	Sun Kudumbam Awards	Sun Kudumbam Best Dubbing Artist Award Male	Dasarathy	Arya (Arnav)	Nominated
2014	Sun Kudumbam Awards	Sun Kudumbam Best Dubbing Artist Award Female	Geetha	Patty (Lalitha)	Nominated
2014	Sun Kudumbam Awards	Sun Kudumbam Best Cinematographer Award	Sudheer Babu	Arya	Nominated
2015	Serial Awards	Best Actor	Arnav	Arya	Nominated

== See also ==
- List of programs broadcast by Sun TV
