= Thangamagal (TV series) =

- Genre: Drama
- Written by: Selva Vadivel (dailogues)
- Screenplay by: Msphaniraaj
- Story by: Msphaniraaj
- Directed by: Haris Athitya
- Starring: Ashwini Aanandita; Yuvan Mayilsamy
- Composer: Vallavan
- Country of origin: India
- Original language: Tamil
- No. of seasons: 1
- No. of episodes: 479

Production
- Producers: Vani Moorthi Palaparthy; Abishek Palaparthy
- Cinematography: Ma.Po. Anandh
- Editor: K. Sukumar
- Camera setup: Multi-camera
- Running time: approx. 22-25 minutes per episode
- Production company: Beyond Cinemas

Original release
- Network: Star Vijay
- Release: 22 January 2024 – 10 August 2025

Thangamagal: Ilam Devadhaigalin Kadhai (Golden Girl: A Tale of Young Angels) is a 2024 Indian Tamil-language television series starring Ashwini Aanandita and Yuvan Mayilsamy in lead roles. Accustomed to a life of luxury and devoid of remorse, Hasini is forced to work as a housemaid to seek forgiveness from a grieving family—unaware that the man she serves unknowingly longs for her as his dream lover.

It airs on Star Vijay from 22 January 2024 on Monday to Saturday and ended on 10 August 2025 on Sunday. It is also available on the digital platform Disney+ Hotstar.

== Plot ==
Hasini is a daddy's girl who gets anything she wants and has no regrets in her luxurious city life. Her mother cares for her, but is harsh as she is a lawyer. On the other hand, Muthupandi is a loan shark who resides in a village and gets into fights with others. His sister is unhappy with her marriage and eagerly pushes to get his nieces married so she can stake her claim in Ramasamy's will and inherit his properties.

During Dheeraj's birthday, his friends offer Hasini alcohol under the guise of soft drinks as she doesn't drink alcohol. Hasini then proceeds to drive under the influence, and at the same time, Ramasamy is on the phone to Muthupandi's sister talking about the will. However, Hasini ends up running Ramasamy over due to her drunken state and he dies at the scene.

Upon her mother finding out about this, she subjects her to seek the forgiveness of Muthupandi's family or else she will be disowned as her daughter. In turn, she joins their house as a maid to seek their forgiveness. However, Muthupandi and his nieces are not willing to forgive the person who killed their father. Whilst it is unknown to them that Hasini killed him, the story pivots around how Hasini seeks their forgiveness.

== Cast ==
=== Main ===
- Ashwini Aanandita as Hasini alias Anjali alias Noor Jahan, Muthupandi's wife, who accidentally killed Raamaswamy in a car accident
- Yuvan Mayilsamy as Muthupandi, Hasini's husband Ramasaamy's brother-in-law

=== Recurring ===
- Neepa Siva as Ranganayagi, Ramasamy’s second wife. Meenakshi, Dharani and Divya’s stepmother, Vasu’s mother. Muthupandi's sister (Main Antagonist)
- Gayatri Jayaraman (2024 - 2025) → Jeevitha Krishnan (2025) as Bhairavi , Dheeraj's Mother (Antagonist)
- Sai Rithu as Meenakshi, Ramasamy’s eldest daughter, Renganayagi’s eldest stepdaughter, Dharani and Divya’s sister, Vasu’s first half sister
- Maanas Chavali as Dheeraj, Hasini's ex-fiancé, Meenakshi's husband
- Shiyara Shalini as Dharani, Ramasamy’s second daughter, Renganayagi’s second stepdaughter, Meenakshi’s younger sister, Divya’s older sister, Vasu’s second half sister
- Lokesh Bhaskaran as Dr.Ajay, Dharani's love interest, later becomes her husband.
- Manusri Karthikeyan as Divya, Ramasamy’s youngest daughter, Renganayagi’s youngest stepdaughter, Meenakshi and Dharani’s youngest sister, Vasu’s third half sister
- Gracy Thangavel / Unknown as Kavya, Muthupandi's friend who helps Anjali find an accommodation in the village
- Birla Bose as Velayutham (Antagonist)
- Ajay Rathnam as GK, Hasini's father, a huge businessman
- Ambani Shankar as Jelabi, Muthupandi's friend
- Bhuvaneshwari Bernard as Nagamani, Ranganayagi's friend (Antagonist)
- VJ Annamalai as Krishna, one-sided love of Dharani.
- Sumathishree as Mariamma, Krishna's mother
- Vinodhini Vaidyanathan as Vaishali, Hasini's mother, a lawyer who makes her realize her wrongdoing by making her apologize to Muthupandi's family (dead).
- Thalaivasal Vijay as Ramasamy, Muthupandi's brother-in-law who is run over by Hasini (dead).
- Lailaa as Thara, Dheeraj's girlfriend (dead).

== Production ==
=== Casting ===
Yuvan Mayilsamy, the son of late comedian Mayilsamy, was cast in the main male lead role of Muthupandi - his first role as a newcomer in the industry, whilst Ashwini Aanandita was cast in the female lead role of Hasini after her notable performances in Namma Veetu Ponnu.

=== Release ===
The initial promo gave a brief look at Muthupandi's family and showed Hasini working as a maid in their house as she had nowhere else to go and was happy to take anything, this was released on 4 January 2024. The second and third promos gave a brief look into Muthupandi's life, with his mother and sister describing his character. The fourth promo features Reshma Muralidaran, as Renuka from Kizhakku Vaasal, giving context behind the serial; the final promo gives insight into Hasini's life.

=== Promotion ===
Star Vijay promoted this serial, as well as Chinna Marumagal, through Bigg Boss Season 7 during an episode aired on 5 January 2024.
