= Chinnanchiru Kiliye =

- Genre: Melodrama
- Written by: Dialogues: Anandh; Initial Concept; Vikatan Televistas
- Screenplay by: V.K. Amirtharaj
- Directed by: S. Anandh Babu
- Starring: Swathika; Naresh Raj; Rowthiram Syed; Harsha Nair; Jangiri Madhumitha
- Music by: Aron Suresh
- Country of origin: India
- Original language: Tamil
- No. of episodes: 350

Production
- Producers: Sundaram; Bhavani
- Cinematography: Guna Ramesh
- Editor: AJ
- Camera setup: Multi-camera
- Running time: 22–24 minutes
- Production company: Seyon Media

Original release
- Network: Zee Tamil
- Release: 21 June 2025 – present

Chinnanchiru Kiliye is a 2025 Indian Tamil-language family Melodrama television series starring Swathika, Naresh Raj, Rowthiram Syed, Harsha Nair and Jangiri Madhumitha It premiered on Zee Tamil on 21 June 2025, and airs on Monday to Saturday at 19:00 and streams digitally on ZEE5. It is produced by Sundaram and Bhavani, and directed by S. Anandh Babu.

== Plot ==
The story is about a self-made, middle-class woman, Indhu, who vows never to bow or borrow. However, she marries Karna, who is a young debt collector. It is about how, who marries into a male-dominated family by a twist of fate, fights for her rights and wins.

== Cast ==
=== Main ===
- Naresh Raj as Karunakaran Alais Karna
- Swathika as Indhumathi Alais Indhu
- Rowthiram Syed as Kirubakaran: Deenadayal first's son
- Shivam as Divakaran : Deenadayal second's son
- Abitha / Harsha Nair as Suguna Kirubakaran
- Jangiri Madhumitha as Jayanthi Divakaran

=== Recurring ===
- Vincent Roy as Deenadayal : Kirubakaran,Divakaran & Karnakaran's father
- Punitha Balakrishnan as Deepa :Indhumathi's elder sister
- --- as Painter Balu : Indhumathi and Deepa’s father
- --- as Ganesan
- Ajith kumar as Vishva : Kirubakaran & Suguna's Second son
- Simran Advani as Chitra : Kirubakaran & Suguna's First daughter
- Ajith Kumar as Bhaskar
- Thidiyan as Bullet Pandi: Karna's friend
- Sai lavanya/Anandi Ganesan as Buvana : Jayanthi's yonger sister & karna's one-side love interest
- Ganesh as Karthik: Deepa’s Husband
- Unknown/Sudha Pushpa as Karthik's mother
- Sarth as Kathir Chitra's ex-fiancé (Deceased) Antagonist
- Hema as Selvi : Indhumathi's friend
- Indu as Lakshmi Teacher

=== Special Appearance ===
- Sujitha as Lakshmi
- Vinodhini Vaidyanathan as Judge
- Rekha Harris as Usharani
- Gaayathri Krishnan as Meenakshi, Indhu and Deepa’s deceased mother.
- Sneha Nambiar as Seethalaksmi, Karna’s deceased mother
- Anand Selvan as Shiva IPS: Karna's friend
- Jayanthi Mala as Thenmozhi
- Anitha Sampath as Anchor
- Suganthi Priya Krishnan as fake Karuna's girl friend

== Production ==
=== Casting ===
Newcomer actress Swathika plays the lead role as Indhu in the series, alongside actor Naresh Raj was cast as the male lead Karna, marking his first series as a lead actor. Thirumathi Selvam fame Abitha was cast as Sugana, marking her return after Maari. Jangiri Madhumitha was cast as Jayanthi, marking her full-fledged return to television series after a five-year hiatus.

In August 2025, Sujitha was cast as Lakshmi in special appearances. In January 2026, Rekha Harris was cast as Usharani in special appearances.

=== Release ===
On 21 June 2025, the first Launch promo was released, which gave a brief insight in both Karna and Indhu's lives. It began airing on Zee Tamil, from 21 June 2025 on Monday to Saturday at 19:00, replacing Gettimelam time slot.
