= Deivamagal =

Indian Tamil-language soap opera

- Genre: Soap opera Crime thriller
- Screenplay by: V. K. Amirtharaj; C. U. Muthuselvan; Dialogues: Ezhil Varadhan; Vasu Bharathi; Nandhan Sridharan
- Directed by: S. Kumaran
- Creative director: Radhika Srinivasan
- Starring: Vani Bhojan; Krishna; Rekha Krishnappa
- Theme music composer: Kiran
- Opening theme: "Kaalai Ezhunthathum"
- Country of origin: India
- Original language: Tamil
- No. of episodes: 1,466

Production
- Producer: B. Srinivasan
- Cinematography: S.T. Martz
- Editor: S. Nielstein
- Camera setup: Multi-camera
- Running time: 22 minutes
- Production company: Vikatan Televistas Pvt Ltd

Original release
- Network: Sun TV
- Release: 25 March 2013 – 17 February 2018

Deivamagal (transl. God's daughter) is an Indian Tamil language soap opera starring Vani Bhojan, Krishna and Rekha Krishnappa in the lead roles. It was broadcast on Sun TV initially from Monday to Friday and later extended to Saturday from 25 March 2013 to 17 February 2018 for 1,466 episodes. The show replaced S. Kumaran's soap, Thirumathi Selvam and was replaced by Nayagi.

The show is produced by Vikatan Televistas Pvt Ltd and director by S. Kumaran. This serial was shot in Pollachi, Chennai, Chengalpet, Hyderabad, Kerala, Puducherry, Cuddalore and Climax scene shot in One Island. This is the first TV serial shot in the Bay of Bengal. The show started The show was re-telecastied from January 19, 2026, to May 30, 2026, at 10:30AM (Indian Standard Time) in Sun TV.

== Plot ==
The story mainly revolves around Prakash and his wife Sathyapriya fighting against his eldest sister-in-law Gayathri and her conspiracies against their families to acquire Prakash's ancestral property, the Jai Hind Vilas.

Sathyapriya grows up in rich family in the village of Poongodi. Her parents Sundaram and Sampoornam were loving. She has two younger siblings, Dharani and Anjali. Sundharam arranges marriage for Sathya with Karthik, a businessman. Unfortunately, Karthik and Sathya's wedding is halted. Due to this, Sundharam dies of a heart attack. After her father's death, Sathya and her family moved to her uncle Devaraj's house in Chennai. There, Sathya and her family suffer much because of Devaraj's greedy wife Saroja. Saroja starts to take revenge on Sathya's family as Sundaram had rejected her son, Suresh's, marriage proposal with Sathya. Saroja determines to chase Sathya and her family from her house.

Then there is Jaihind Vilas family where Chidambaram is head of the family and proud fan of Mahatma. Chidambaram and his wife, Janaki, have four children. The elder Kumar is married to Gayathri, and they have a daughter Monisha. The second son Raju is lazy and sleeps at home all day. He has a wife Thilaga, who stays with her mother. They have their only daughter, and the youngest, Ragini, who goes to college. Their third son, Prakash, is short-tempered. Prakash's attempts to pass exams and get a government job are spoiled by Gayathri. Gayathri rules the family. The family is forced to do all the work for her except Prakash. Gayathri wants to take the Jai Hind Vilas property all for herself. Prakash is aware of this and obstructs her attempts to get the property. Gayathri, works as a GM in star hotel where Sathya joins to work to support her family.

Devaraj and Sampoornam want Sathya and Suresh to get married, but Saroja disapproves of it and arranges a marriage alliance with another girl. Meanwhile, Sathya gets introduced to Prakash's parents and Prakash himself. Her meeting with Prakash and subsequent sessions does not go well. Nevertheless, they become good friends, after Sathya saves Prakash even though he wanted to abuse her. Prakash protects Sathya's sister Dharani from some youths with evil intentions. This leads to him to fall for her innocence, and he decides to marry her. Dharani, who is in love with her cousin Suresh, does not like it. In the meantime, Prakash arranges house for Sathya's family after Saroja chases them out. Sathya meets Karthik and works at his office, unaware that Karthik is the MD. Karthik's mother, Annapoorani realizes her mistake for stopping Sathya's marriage to her son and decides to get Sathya married to Karthik, as Karthik still loves her, despite Sathya resenting Annapoorani and her family for what they did. Saroja lures Annapoorani with false promises that she will get Sathya married to Karthik, taking INR 10 lakh and some jewelry and safekeeps them for Suresh's marriage.

On the wedding day of Prakash and Dharani, Gayathri provokes Dharani to elope with Suresh. When she does, Gayathri humiliates Prakash by saying that not even a single girl wants to marry him. Prakash gets angry and forces Sathya to marry him, to win over Gayathri. Sathya accepts as Sampoornam begs her, marrying Prakash for her mother's wishes, while Prakash is happy to think that he has defeated Gayathri in the challenge. Later, Prakash takes his wife Sathya with him to his house Jai Hind Vilas. At the temple, Suresh marries Dharani and brings her to Devaraj's home, but Saroja chases them out. Later Karthik learns about Sathya's marriage with Prakash, leaving him heartbroken. Annapoorani too learns about this and confronts Saroja, who denies the claims made by the former and calls her crazy. Sathya learns about her workplace and confronts Karthik, who admits that he wanted to marry her, but ditched his intentions upon learning what happened

Sathya, Sampoornam and Anjali disown Dharani. Devaraj accepts Suresh and Dharani. Saroja wants to separate Dharani from her son but Dharani outwits her. A further argument between Prakash and Suresh leads to a rocky relationship between the two families. Meanwhile, Sathya and Prakash understand and fall in love with each other. Prakash gets into a quarrel with Sathya's mother and prevents her from meeting her mother. Unable to go against Prakash, Sathya agrees. Sathya gets pregnant, and meanwhile, Saroja plans to separate Dharani from Suresh. She puts poison in her own drink and accuses Dharani of mixing it. Suresh chases Dharani from their house and she attempts suicide.

A lady saves Tharani from killing herself. But she is revealed to be an evil woman who plans to sell Dharani. Prakash saves Dharani from the lady. Dharani does not understand them and stays adamant with them. Annapoorani, wanting revenge, gets Devaraj's approval to get Sujatha married to Karthik, much to Saroja's fury, who vows to stop the alliance. Due to several things, Sathya has a miscarriage, and hides it from Prakash. No one knows the truth apart from Sathya's mother, sister and Prakash's sister-in-law, Thilaga. When Sampoornam accidentally blurts out the truth, Prakash is infuriated and chases Sathya out. He refuses to talk to her. When finally, after accepting fate, he changes his mind and goes to propose to her, but he is stabbed by some goons who messed with Sathya and Prakash in the past but survived. Meanwhile, Saroja frames Sujatha as a kleptomaniac and stops the alliance, triggering a rocky relation between Devaraj and Annapoorani's families. Sathya and Prakash start to care more for each other. Meanwhile, Suresh still suspects Dharani of poisoning his mother. Later, when Saroja' conspiracies are exposed, Devaraj, Suresh and Sujatha disown Saroja and expel her, Vijaya and Ganesan from their house. Suresh later accepts Dharani and her innocence, and Sujatha and Karthik get married.

Prakash and Sathya join the government and become officers besides the troubles given by Gayathri. Later, Prakash shows the true colors of Gayathri in front of Jai Hind Vilas family and then, Kumar beats and expels her from Jaihind Vilas. Now, Gayathri joins her hands with Nambi, a businessman who loves Gayathri. Gayathri again troubles Prakash and Jaihind Vilas with help of Nambi but Prakash and Sathya stand against her and manage her evil plans to save his property from her. Kumar then marries Akila, a widow, and has a son, while Gayathri creates many obstacles in their life but Prakash protects the family. Sathya becomes pregnant again. Gayathri was losing everything and was defeated by Prakash. Further, frustrated Gayathri kidnapped Nambi. Then, Sathya was arrested during pregnancy. Later, Prakash found all of Gayathri's evil acts and saved Nambi from her and had Sathya released, but Gayatri shot Nambi from a distance and escaped.

During the mean time, Gayathri is abscond and an IPS officer Mantra (look alike of Gayathri) is appointed to find Gayathri. Gayathri killed Mantra and went to her place to disguise as Mantra. Sathya and Prakash found Mantra is killed and applied the case in court. Court appoints a new officer ACP Samuel Raja to find the truth behind Mantra and Gayathri. After a few struggles, Gayathri is arrested, but escapes from police with a pistol and shoots Akila in front of Kumar and Prakash and kidnaps Moni. The next day she had kidnapped Maha and decides to kill her to win Prakash. Prakash and Sathya search for the two kids along with the ACP Samuel Raja. First they rescued Moni but While rescuing Maha, Prakash shoots Gayathri as a self-defense and sentenced to prison for six years. After that, Prakash and Sathya lived happily with their children in the Jaihind Vilas.

== Cast ==
=== Main ===
- Vani Bhojan as Sathyapriya "Sathya" Prakash; Main Protagonist (1-1466)
- Krishna Raghunandan as "Prakash" Chidambaram; Main Protagonist (42-1466)
- Rekha Krishnappa in dual roles:
  - as Gayathri Kumar alias "Anniyar"; Main Antagonist (42-1466)
  - as Mantra Devi IPS, Gayatri's look alike, killed by Gayathri (1267-1417)

=== Recurring ===
- Rajyalakshmi / Surekha as Sampoornam: Sathyapriya, Dharani and Anjali's mother (1-1466)
- Shabnam as Dharani: Suresh's wife. Sathya's first younger sister (1-1306)
- Usha Sai as Anjali: Gunasekaran's wife. Sathya and Dharani's younger sister. (1-1466)
- Sabitha Anand as Saroja: Devaraj's wife, Suresh and Sujatha's mother, Dharani's mother-in-law, Sathyapriya, Anjali's aunt (1-1336)
- Auditor Sridhar as Devaraj: Saroja husband, Suresh and Sujatha's father, Sampoornam's elder brother, Dharani's father-in-law. Sathyapriya, Anjali's uncle (1-1466)
- SVS Kumar as "Chidambaram": Prakash, Kumar, Raju and Ragini's father, a Gandhian (42-1466)
- Vennira Aadai Nirmala as "Janaki": Chidambaram's wife, Kumar, Raju, Ragini and Prakash's mother (42-1466)
- Prakash Rajan as Kumar Chidambaram, Prakash's eldest brother (42-1466)
- Arvind Khathare as Raju Chidambaram, Prakash's second eldest brother (42-1466)
- Anitha Venkat / Sindhu Shyam as Thilagavathy "Thilaga": Raju's wife, Prakash's second sister-in-law (42-1466)
- Nisha Krishnan / Vanitha Hariharan as Ragini: Vasanth's wife, Prakash's younger sister. (42-1466)
- Siddhanth Venkatesh as "Suresh": Devaraj's son, Dharani's husband, Sathyapriya, Anjali's cousin (2-1040)
- Sunitha Srinivasan as Sujatha: Devaraj and Saroja's daughter. Karthik's wife and Sathyapriya, Dharani, Anjali's cousin. (2-1336)
- Subramanian Gopalakrishnan / Yesakkiappan as Karthikeyan "Karthik": Annapoorani's son, Sathya's ex-fiancé, Sujatha's husband. (1-1336)
- Anuradha as Annapoorani: Karthik's mother, Sujatha's mother-in-law. (1-1466)
- Suhasini as Vinodhini: Gayatri's younger sister, Moorthy's ex-wife, who commits suicide. (42-1429)
- Ganesh as "Moorthy": Vinodhini's ex-husband, Sathyakala's husband (42-1466)
- Suchitra as Akila: Kumar's second wife, who was killed by Gayathri (925-1435)
- Revathee Shankar as Usha Rani (380-1466)
- Sivalingam Babu as Shankar: Usha Rani's husband (380-1466)
- VJ Sam / Raghul Kanagaraj as Vasanthakumar "Vasanth" Shankar: Usha Rani's son, Ragini's husband (375-1466)
- R. Radha as Sathyakala: Sathyapriya's ex-rival; Moorthy's second wife (1-40, 1074–1466)
- Udumalai Ravi as Ekambaram: Prakash's friend and the councilor of his area (375-1418)
- Ashok Kumar as Ashok, Prakash's friend (42-1466)
- Manush Manmohan as Arivudai Nambi, killed by Gayatri (700-1085)
- Suresh Joshua as Gunasekaran Dharmalingam, Anjali's husband (1152-1466)
- Sreeja as Monisha Kumar, Kumar and Gayathri's daughter. (42-1466)
- Sanjana Sree as Mahalakshmi Prakash: Prakash and Sathya's daughter. (1282-1466)
- Krithika as Mahalakshmi Raju: Raju and Thilagavathi's daughter (500-1466)
- Sribala as "Ravi": Akhila's brother-in-law (931-1466)
- Meesai Rajendran as Dharmalingam "Lingam" (1123-1465)
- Apollo Ravi as "Ganesh", Saroja's tenant and sidekick, Moorthy's best friend who goes to jail for being involved in Gayathri's plan to kill Sathya by kidnapping and confining her in the boot of his car while she was pregnant. (25-1229)
- Gracey as Vijaya Ganesh, Saroja's tenant and sidekick (25-1330)
- Anbalaya Prabhakaran as Sundaramoorthy "Sundaram", Sampoornam's late husband, Sathya, Dharani and Anjali's father. (1-43)
- Raju Sathish as Sathish, Prakash's friend
- Saravanan as Saravanan, Prakash's friend
- Sai Vairam as Senthil, Prakash's friend
- Karthick Chandra as Assistant Commissioner of ACP Samuel Raja
- Aravish as Sathishkumar "Sathish" Prabhakaran (707-927)
- Nivisha as Sangeetha Sathish Prabhakaran, Moorthy's niece (650-927)
- Sekar Muthu Raja as Aravindkrishnan "Aravind", Minister Nallathambi's relative (853-921)
- Sasikala Shree as Vasanthi
- Ameya Nair as Anamika, Prakash's ex-girlfriend, who was killed in a bomb blast (1290-1365)
- Balaji as Amar, IPS Mantra Gayatri Devi's husband
- Mercy Leyal as Malarvizhi Venkatesh, Nambi's sister
- Bhavani as Sathyakala's mother
- Durai Mani as Velliangiri, Sathyakala's ex-husband, who is killed by Gayathri
- Deepa as Mangamma, a supporter of Gayathri in the climax (1450-1464)

== Adaptations ==
Language	Title	Original release	Network(s)	Last aired	Notes
Tamil	Deivamagal தெய்வமகள்	25 March 2013	Sun TV	17 February 2018	Original
Malayalam	Bhagyalakshmi	3 February 2014	Surya TV	27 August 2016	Remake
Telugu	Oohalu Pallakkilo	2014	Gemini TV	2016	Remake
Bengali	Debi দেবী	13 September 2021	Sun Bangla	6 February 2022	Remake
Marathi	Thoda Tuza Ani Thoda Maza थोडं तुझं आणि थोडं माझं	17 June 2024	Star Pravah	12 September 2025	Remake
Hindi	Ram Bhavan राम भवन	29 January 2025	Colors TV	11 July 2025	Remake

== Awards and nominations ==
Deivamagal awards and nominations
Awards and nominations
Award	Wins	Nominations
Vikatan Awards	4	
Sun Kudumbam Awards	16	9
Tamil Nadu State Television Awards	4	

Totals (Note: Certain award groups do not simply award one winner. They acknowledge several different recipients, have runners-up, and have third place. Since this is a specific recognition and is different from losing an award, runner-up mentions are considered wins in this award tally. For simplification and to avoid errors, each award in this list has been presumed to have had a prior nomination.)
- Wins: 24
- Nominations: 9

Year	Award	Category	Recipient	Role	Result
2013	Tamil Nadu State Television Awards	Best Serial	Deivamagal		Won
2013	Tamil Nadu State Television Awards	Best Negative Role Female	Rekha Krishnappa	Gayathri	Won
2013	Tamil Nadu State Television Awards	Best Dubbing Artist-Male	Sabari for Krishna	Prakash	Nominated
2013	Tamil Nadu State Television Awards	Best Dubbing Artist-Female	Renuka Kathir for Vani Bhojan	Sathya Priya	Won
2014	Sun Kudumbam Awards	Best Serial	Deivamagal		Won
2014	Sun Kudumbam Awards	Best Mamanaar	S. V. S. Kumar	Chidambaram	Won
2014	Sun Kudumbam Awards	Best Screenplay	Ve. Ki. Amirtharaj		Won
2014	Sun Kudumbam Awards	Best Director	S. Kumaran		Won
2014	Sun Kudumbam Awards	Best Negative Role Female	Rekha Krishnappa	Gayathri	Won
2014	Sun Kudumbam Awards	Devathaigal	Vani Bhojan	Sathyapriya	Won
2014	Sun Kudumbam Awards	Best Actor Male Lead	Krishna	Prakash	Nominated
2014	Sun Kudumbam Awards	Best Actress Female Lead	Vani Bhojan	Sathyapriya	Nominated
2014	Sun Kudumbam Awards	Best Mamiyaar	Vennira Aadai Nirmala	Janaki	Nominated
2014	Sun Kudumbam Awards	Best Supporting Actor Male	Auditor Sridhar	Devaraj	Nominated
2014	Sun Kudumbam Awards	Best Supporting Actor Female	Sindhu Shyam	Thilaga Raju	Nominated
2014	Sun Kudumbam Awards	Best Sister Award	Shabnam	Dharani	Nominated
2014	Sun Kudumbam Awards	Best Comedian Male	Ganesh	Moorthy	Nominated
2014	Sun Kudumbam Awards	Best Dialogue Writer	Vasu Bharathi		Nominated
2014	Sun Kudumbam Awards	Best Dubbing Artist-Male	Krishna	Prakash	Nominated
2014	Sun Kudumbam Awards	Best Dubbing Artist-Female	Vani Bhojan	Sathyapriya	Won
2015	Vikatan Awards	Best Serial	Deivamagal		Won
2016	Vikatan Awards	Best Serial	Deivamagal		Won
2017	Vikatan Awards	Best Serial	Deivamagal		Won
2018	Vikatan Awards	Best Serial	Deivamagal		Won
2018	Sun Kudumbam Viruthugal	Best Actress	Vani Bhojan	Sathyapriya	Won
2018	Sun Kudumbam Viruthugal	Best Actor	Krishna	Prakash	Won
2018	Sun Kudumbam Viruthugal	Best Villain	Rekha Krishnappa	Gayathri	Won
2018	Sun Kudumbam Viruthugal	Best Director	S.Kumaran		Won
2018	Sun Kudumbam Viruthugal	Best Serial	Deivamagal		Won

== Reception ==
In the first eight weeks of 2017, the series was the highest-rated primetime Tamil television series. In weeks 42 and 43 of 2017, it was at second position.
