= Abitha =

Indian film and television actress

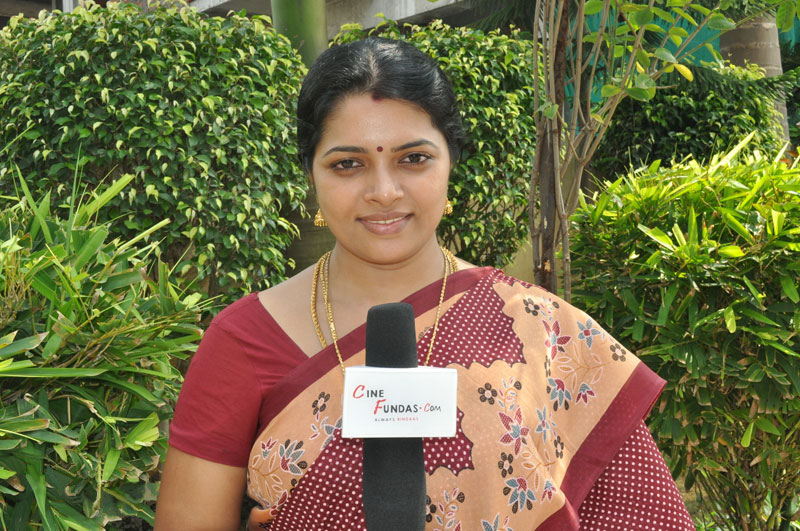
- Born: Jenila
- Other name: Janeesha
- Occupation: Actress
- Spouse: Sunil
- Children: 2

Abitha is an Indian actress who appears in Tamil language films and television serials. She appeared in notable productions including Sethu alongside Vikram. She is famous for her role as Archana in the serial Thirumathi Selvam, which aired from 2007 to 2013 in Sun TV starring opposite Sanjeev. She was the winner of Sun Kudumbam Viruthugal for Best Actress twice by Sun Kudumbam Viruthugal for Thirumathi Selvam in the years 2010 and 2012.

== Career ==
As a teenager, Abitha used to go and see the television serial, Nancy starring Sanghavi, being filmed near her house in Thiruvottiyur. The director of that serial recognised her and spoke to her parents, roping her in to play the heroine's sister in their next TV serial Criminal. After doing a couple of serials, she did a low-budget film titled Golmaal as the sister of the lead lady and then B-Grade film titled Devadasi in Malayalam. At that time, director Bala roped her in for a leading role in Sethu alongside Vikram, which she signed after Keerthi Reddy and Rajshri had dropped out. Bala renamed her Abitha from her original name of Jenila for the film, after the character she was portraying. The film opened in December 1999 at a single noon show at a suburban theatre but built up through word-of-mouth publicity and ran for over one hundred days at several cinema halls across Chennai, becoming a critical and commercial success. Sethu won the National Film Award for Best Feature Film in Tamil and secured wins in the Best Film category at the Filmfare Awards and the Cinema Express Awards, while Abitha won critical acclaim for her role of a Tamil Brahmin girl. After Sethu's success, Abitha was flooded with offers but chose to complete her studies and finish her PG in Sociology from Annamalai University. She revealed that by the time she decided to come back she had lost her contacts in the industry and was thereafter seen in only a couple of insignificant projects.

She appeared alongside veteran actor Ramarajan in Seerivarum Kaalai before starring in Poove Pen Poove alongside newcomer Ishaq Husseini. After the failure of those films she played the role of Arjun's sister in Arasatchi. Other films in the period, such as Pirantha Naal with Prakash Raj, Kashmir with Abhinay and Kandhavel with Murali were not completed and indefinitely shelved. In 2005, she got another breakthrough and signed on to play the lead role in Kannamma scripted by Karunanidhi, but to do so she unceremoniously opted out of another film titled Ullakadathal. Subsequently, the producers of that film complained and got her banned by the Producer's Council, leaving her out of both films. Later that year she featured in Unarchigal alongside Abbas and Kunal.

Abitha was selected the best actress of Sun TV in the first two editions of Sun Kudumbam awards held in the years 2010 and 2012 for her performance as Archana in the show. She also starred in the serial Thangamana Purushan. She got married in 2009 and continued to work in serials following her marriage.

== Filmography ==
Year	Title	Role	Language	Notes
1997	Ettupatti Rasa	Ponrasu's daughter	Tamil	Credited as Janeesha
1998	Golmaal	Reshma	Tamil	Credited as Janeesha
1997	Masmaram	Jasmine	Malayalam	Credited as Janeesha
1999	Devadasi	Mala	Malayalam	Credited as Janeesha
1999	Sethu	Abithakuchalambal (Abitha)	Tamil	Nominated- Filmfare Award for Best Tamil Actress
2001	Seerivarum Kaalai	Kamakshi	Tamil	
2001	Poove Pen Poove		Tamil	
2002	Puthiya Alai		Tamil	
2004	Arasatchi	Shwetha Ashok Mehta	Tamil	
2004	Aagodella Olledakke		Kannada	
2006	Unarchigal	Amrutha	Tamil	
2006	Suyetchai MLA	Lakshmi	Tamil	
2007	Nam Naadu	Sathya's wife	Tamil	
2017	En Kadhal Devathai		Tamil	
2023	Thee Ivan		Tamil	

== Television ==
Year	Title	Role	Channel	Language
1997	Criminal		Doordarshan	Tamil
1998	Gokulam Colony			Tamil
2002	Varam	Swarna	Sun TV	Tamil
2002–2006	Nagamma		Gemini TV	Telugu
2003	Kungumam		Sun TV	Tamil
2003–2005	Priyanaka		ETV	Telugu
2005	Kadamattathu Kathanar	Unnimaya	Asianet	Malayalam
2006–2007	Raja Rajeshwari	Raja Rajeshwari	Sun TV	Tamil
2006–2007	Sorgam	Surya	Sun TV	Tamil
2007–2013	Thirumathi Selvam	Archana	Sun TV	Tamil
2008–2010	Thangamana Purushan	Raasi	Kalaignar TV	Tamil
2008	Manikoondu	Special Appearance	Sun TV	Tamil
2009	Simran Thirai	Shalini	Jaya TV	Tamil
2009–2010	Adhiparasakthi	Renuka Devi	Raj TV	Tamil
2011	Thendral	Archana	Sun TV	Tamil
2013–2014	Ponnunjal	Nandhini Vishwa	Sun TV	Tamil
2013–2014	Muthaaram	Ranjini Murali	Sun TV	Tamil
2019	Lakshmi Stores	Dr. Shyamala / Shanthi	Sun TV	Tamil
2022–2023	Maari	Deivanai	Zee Tamil	Tamil
2022	Super Mom Season 3	Contestant	Zee Tamil	Tamil
2025–2026	Chinnanchiru Kiliye	Suguna	Zee Tamil	Tamil
