= Sun Kudumbam Viruthugal =

- Awarded for: Achievements in Television
- Date: 2010
- Site: Chennai
- Country: Tamil Nadu (India)
- Hosted by: Main hosts 2010: Kasthuri; Rishi; Main hosts 2012: Deepak Dinkar; Aishwarya; Main hosts 2014: Deepak Dinkar; Devadarshini; Main hosts 2018: RJ Vigneshkanth; Nakshathra; Main hosts 2019: Athulya; Aadhavan; Main hosts 2022: Sathish; Dhanya Balakrishna
- Final award: 2025

Television/radio coverage
- Network: Sun Network

Sun Kudumbam Viruthugal (Sun Family Awards) is an awards ceremony held to honour the cast and crew of the television serials which air on Sun TV, presented by Sun Network. The first awards ceremony happened in 2010 and it is a biennial award ceremony.

== Nominations ==
The top four performances in all serials, including the serials that have ended the past year, in different categories are chosen by jurors. During February and March, the nominees are interviewed on Sun TV and viewers are asked to cast their votes by text messaging their favourite actor in each category. The actor receiving the highest votes are proclaimed winner of the award in that category. Technical awards are given to backstage technicians, such as screenwriters and directors, by Sun Network and are not chosen by viewers.

== Awards ==
=== General awards ===
- Best Overall Performance Award

The Sun Kudumbam Best Overall Performance Award is given by Sun Network as part of its annual Sun Kudumbam Awards for artistes in television serials aired on Sun TV.

| Year | Actor | Serial | Role |
|---|---|---|---|
| 2010 | Radhika | Arasi | Arasi; Selvi |

- Special Jury Award
- Best Serial Award
- Lifetime Achievement Award
- Natchathira Special Award

=== Performance awards ===
- Best Actor
- Best Actress
- Best Supporting Actor
- Best Supporting Actress
- Best Brother
- Best Sister
- Best Father
- Best Mother
- Best Mamiyar
- Best Mamanar
- Best Male Villain
- Best Female Villain

=== Technical Awards ===
- Best Serial
- Best Director
- Best Screenwriter
- Best Dialogue Writer
- Best Cinematographer
- Best Music Director
- Best Editor

== Sun Kudumbam Viruthugal 2010 ==
The Sun Kudumbam Awards 2010 were given for 22 categories, of which there were 8 main awards, 8 performance awards and 6 technical awards. The nominations and victories were based on votes via text messaging. The award ceremony was hosted by actress Kasthuri and Rishi.

Thirumathi Selvam won 10 awards including Best Serial. Other winners were Arasi and Best Director V. Thiru Selvam for Kolangal with five awards, Thangam with three awards and Sivasakthi and Metti Oli with one.

== Sun Kudumbam Viruthugal 2012 ==
The second edition of Sun Kudumbam Viruthugal 2012 was held on end December 2012. The award ceremony was hosted by actor Deepak Dinkar and Aishwarya. Actress Radhika Sarathkumar won Lifetime Achievement Award

Winners are listed first and highlighted in boldface.

| Best Serial | Special Jury Award | | |
|---|---|---|---|
| **Thirumathi Selvam** | **Delhi Kumar**; **Chetan**; **Radhika**; **Vadivukkarasi** | | |
| Best Son-in-law | Best Daughter-in-law | | |
| **Sathish** - "Manokar" from **Athipookal**; Deepak Dinkar - "Thamilarasu" from Thendral; Sharavan - " Laksupathi " from Uthiripookkal; Shreekumar - "Shekhar" from Pillai Nila | **Srithika** - "Malar" from **Nadhaswaram**; Sujitha - "Meenatchi" from Maruthani; Kaveri - "Abirami" from Thyagam; Durga - "Kavitha" from Mundhanai Mudichu | | |
| Best Female Villain Character | Best Comedian | **Rani** - "Indrasena" from **Valli**; **Rekha Krishnappa** - "Gayathri" from **Deivamagal** | **Muneesh Raja** - "Sammandham" from **Nadhaswaram**; Pollachi Babu - "Karthik" from Thangam; Shyaam - "Anand" from Thendral; Bhanu Chander - "Murthi" from Karthigai Pengal |
| Best Jodi | Dubbing Artist Male | | |
| **Deepak Dinkar & Shruthi Raj** - "Tamil & Thulasi" from **Thendral**; Shreekumar & Divya Padmini - "Shekhar & Hema" from Pillai Nila; Sanjeev & Abitha - "Selvam & Archana " from Thirumathi Selvam; Thirumurugan & Srithika - "Gopi & Malar" from Nadhaswaram | **Shankar** - from **Chellamay**; Ravi Shanker - from Ilavarasi; Vasu - from Thangam; Vijaykumar - from Uthiripookkal | | |

== Sun Kudumbam Virudhugal 2018 ==
The fourth edition of Sun Kudumbam Viruthugal 2018 was held on end December 2018. The award ceremony was hosted by RJ Vigneshkanth and Nakshathra

| Best Actor | Best Actress |
|---|---|
| Krishna | Vani Bhojan Nithya Ram |
| Best Serial | Best Villi |
| Deivamagal | Rekha Krishnappa |
| Azhagana Ratchasi | Best Sister |
| Naagasree GS, VJ Sangeetha | Sripriya |
Vidhya Mohan
| Best Supporting Actor | Best Father |
| Riyaz Khan | Thalaivasal Vijay |
| Best Mother | Best Comedy Actor - Male |
| Praveena | Murali Krishnan |
| Best Comedy Actor Female | Multi-Talented |
| Geetha Hema Srikanth | Thirumurugan |
| Sun Natchathiam Special | Best Supporting Actor Female |
| Nirosha Ramki | Nirosha Ramki |
Best Mamanar
Delhi Kumar Poovilangu Mohan

== Sun Kudumbam Virudhugal 2019 ==
The fifth edition of Sun Kudumbam Viruthugal 2019 was held on end 5 January 2020. The award ceremony was hosted by Athulya and Aadhavan.

| Best Sister | Thanga Mangai |
|---|---|
| Benzie Pranklin - Anushya | Khushbu Sundar |
| Best Brother | Best Mother |
| Thirumurugan - gopi - Kalyana Veedu | Meera Krishna - Vasanthi Nayagi |
| | Best Villain |
| Raadika | Suresh Krishnamoorthi - Kalivaradhan Nayagi |
| Best Mother-in-law | Best Daughter-in-law |
| Gayathri Shastry - Kalpana Roja | Shruthi Raj - Sudha Azhagu |
| Best Villi | Real |
| Sangeetha - Poorna Azhagu | Krishna and Chaya Singh |
| Popular Hero | Popular Heroine |
| Sibbu Suryan - arjun Roja Krishna - Shakthivel Run | Nakshathra Nagesh - Bhagyalakshmi Lakshmi Stores |
| Best Heroine | Best Actor |
| Priyanka Nalkari - Roja Roja | Sanjeev - Kannan Kanmani |
| Best Grandmother | Best Screenwriter |
| Kovai Kamala | Thirumurugan Kalyana Veedu |
| Best Grandfather | |
| Delhi Kumar - Periyasundaram Pandavar Illam | Solomon Papaya |
| Best Supporting Actor Male | Best Supporting Actor Female |
| Jishnu Menon - Akash Kanmani | Papri Gosh - Kanmani Nayagi |
| Best Music Director | Best Son-in-law |
| Hari | Pandi Kamal - Vetrimaran Kalyana Parisu |
| Best Producer | Best Jodi |
| Raadikha Thirumurugan | Leesha Eclairs and Sanjeev - Soundarya and Kannan Kanmani |
| Best Female Family Head | Best Director |
| Poornima Bhagyaraj - Vijayalakshmi Kanmani | S. Kumaran Nayagi P.Selvam Azhagu |
| Raja & Bharathi Bhaskar Sirappu Pattimandram | Vadivukkarasi and Devayani |
| Best Young Villi | Popular Serial |
| Shamily Sukumar - Priya Roja | Roja |
| Popular Couple | Best Romantic Couple |
| Priyanka Nalkari and Sibbusuryan - Roja and Arjun Roja | Nakshatra Nagesh and Hussain Ahmed Khan - Bhagyalakshmi and Ravi Lakshmi Stores |

== Sun Kudumbam Virudhugal 2022 ==
The sixth edition of Sun Kudumbam Viruthugal 2022 was aired as two parts wherein the Part 1 of the awards night aired on 17 April 2022 and Part 2 by 24 April 2022. Sathish and Dhanya Balakrishna as the Host.

== Sun Kudumbam Virudhugal 2023 ==
The sixth edition of Sun Kudumbam Viruthugal 2023 was aired as three parts, the first part aired on 11 June, the second part aired on 18 June and the third part aired on 28 June. The hosts this time around were Rishi, Diya Menon, VJ Aswath and Bavithra.

== See also ==
- List of Asian television awards
- Vijay Television Awards
