= Hemalatha =

Indian actress (born 1990)

- Born: 13 November 1987 (age 38); Chennai, Tamil Nadu, India
- Other name: Hema
- Occupations: Film actress, Television Actress and Dancer
- Years active: 1995–2015

Hemalatha, often credited as Hema, is a former Indian actress and dancer who works in Tamil cinema. She is acclaimed for her roles in the popular soap opera Kana Kaanum Kaalangal on STAR Vijay and in the drama serial on Sun TV Thendral. She was the winner of the reality dance show Jodi Number One in Season 4 along with Michael Thangadurai.

== Career ==
Hemalatha was born in Tamil family, started her career as a child actress. She made her début in films in the Rajinikanth starrer Baashha and then acted in the Sarath Kumar starer Suryavamsam. Her first Tamil serial was when she played the role of Baby Kaveri in Chithi. She played the role of Raghavi, a high school student, in Kana Kaanum Kaalangal and later the role of Deepa in the prime time serial Thendral, which made her a household name and established her as one of the top television actresses.

== Filmography ==
Year	Title	Role	Notes
1995	Baashha	Mark Antony's daughter	Child Actress
1996	Poove Unakkaga	girl in song "Sollamalae"	Child Actress
1996	Tamizh Selvan		Child Actress
1997	Suryavamsam	Shaktivel Gounder Jr	Child Actress
1998	Iniyavale	Rani	Child Actress
1998	Unnidathil Ennai Koduthen		Child Actress
1998	Thulli Thirintha Kaalam	girl in song "Deewana"	Child Actress
1999	Poomagal Oorvalam		Child Actress
1999	Sethu		Child Actress
2002	Album	Geetha, Jeeva's Sister	Child Actress
2003	Anbe Un Vasam	Hema	
2003	Kaadhal Kondein	Devi	
2004	Madhurey	Susheela's Sister	
2005	Ji	Bhuvana's Friend	
2006	Parijatham	Subathra's Friend	
2006	Thimiru		
2006	Adaikalam	Amudha	

== Television ==
Year	Serial	Role	Channel
1999–2000	Chithi	Baby Kaveri	Sun TV
2004–2006	Manaivi	Viji	Sun TV
2006–2009	Kana Kaanum Kaalangal	Raghavi	STAR Vijay
2007–2011	Magal	Janani	Sun TV
2009	Jodi Number One	Contestant	STAR Vijay
2009–2010	Anbe Vaa	Angel	STAR Vijay
2009–2015	Thendral	Deepa Prabhakar	Sun TV
2010–2015	Mudhanai Mudichu	Vedhavalli	Sun TV
