= Seerivarum Kaalai =

2001 film by Ramarajan

- VCD cover
- Directed by: Ramarajan
- Written by: Ramarajan
- Produced by: Selva Saroja Subbaiah
- Starring: Ramarajan; Abitha
- Cinematography: K. S. Selvaraj
- Edited by: L. Kesavan
- Music by: Sirpy
- Production company: Kanna Cine Arts
- Release date: 13 April 2001
- Country: India
- Language: Tamil

Seerivarum Kaalai (transl. Menacing Bull) is a 2001 Indian Tamil-language action drama film written and directed by Ramarajan. The film stars himself and Abitha, with Manorama, Vichithra, Mansoor Ali Khan and Anandaraj in supporting roles. It was released on 19 April 2001.

== Plot ==
Kaalaiyan is a do-gooder with a helping hand living in a Puliangudi town. Kaalaiyan falls in love with his sister's friend Kamakshi who is tortured and harassed by her sister-in-law Rukku, while Kamakshi's mother and brother are helpless spectators. After the initial hesitation the timid Kamakshi also reciprocates Kaalaiyan's love. Rukku does not want Kamakshi to marry Kaalaiyan. The duo elopes and gets married. After a violent bashing up of Kaalaiyan and Kamakshi by Rukku's men, the doctors warn Kaalaiyan that Kamakshi's health would be endangered if she were to bear a child. But Kamakshi drugs Kaalaiyan and seduces him. She conceives, but there is nothing to worry. The doctors are proved wrong and she delivers twins. It is time for Kaalaiyan and the gang to hold up their two fingers in "victory" style.

== Cast ==
- Ramarajan as Kaalaiyan
- Abitha as Kamakshi
- Manorama
- S. S. Chandran as Kaalaiyan's Father/Kamakshi's Teacher
- Sathyapriya as Kaalaiyan's Mother
- Mansoor Ali Khan as Kamakshi's brother
- Vichithra as Rukku (Kamakshi's Sister-in-law)
- Alex
- Anandaraj as Police Inspector
- Senthil as Police Constable
- Master Haja Sheriff
- Gundu Kalyanam
- Pasi Sathya
- Vellai Subbaiah

== Production ==
.

== Soundtrack ==
The soundtrack was composed by Sirpy.

| Song | Singers | Lyrics |
|---|---|---|
| "Em Manasiley" | Mano, Sujatha | Muthulingam |
| "Kaalaiyan Varaanda" | Malaysia Vasudevan | Gangai Amaran |
| "Nalla Pillaiya" | Srinivas | Pulamaipithan |
| "Raathiri Nadu Raathiri" | S. P. B. Charan, Harini | Rajarishi |
| "Re Re Retaikkili" (Lady) | K. S. Chithra | Gangai Amaran |
| "Re Re Retaikkili" (Men) | S. P. Balasubrahmanyam | Gangai Amaran |
| "Thuninja Thuninja" | Mano, Krishnaraj | Pulamaipithan |

== Critical reception ==
Malini Mannath of Chennai Online wrote, "[..] it's not as if the film is all that bad. The early part is humorous, Ramarajan being quite comfortable in the lighter scenes. If only he had concentrated more on the script, than in merely thrusting lines with political overtones, the movie would have been better". Cinesouth wrote, "One can easily guess the way in which the scenes are strung together. The screenplay is out of control. There is dearth of comedy. The fans are ill at ease because of these surroundings. Director Ramarajan tests the patience of the audiences. There is no scope for any great performance of acting." Visual Dasan of Kalki wrote that even though Ramarajan's hard work is evident in both the dialogues and the screenplay, because of the old plot, they could not avoid the frequent yawns.
