= Ashwini Aanandita =

Indian actress and model

- Born: 25 July 1996 (age 30); Bangalore, Karnataka, India
- Other name: Ashwini S
- Education: Dreamzone School Of Creative Studies, Banaswadi
- Occupations: Model; Actress; Dancer
- Years active: 2013 – present
- Notable work: Namma Veetu Ponnu; Thangamagal

Ashwini Aanandita (born 25 July 1996) is a model, South Indian television actress and dancer who predominantly appears in Tamil and Kannada television shows. She got her major breakthrough in the reality show Halli Hyda Pyateg Banda Season 2 aired on Star Suvarna as she became the finalist. She is best known as Meenakshi Karthik in Namma Veetu Ponnu and as Hasini in Thangamagal both being telecast in Star Vijay.

== Early life and education ==
Ashwini was born on 25 July 1996 in Bangalore, Karnataka. Her mother tongue is Kannada. She did her schooling in Vagdevi Vilas School, Bangalore and later completed her graduation in Dreamzone School Of Creative Studies, Banaswadi, Bangalore.

== Career ==
In 2013, Ashwini started her career as a model and in 2014 she was featured in the reality show Pyate Hudgir Halli Life Season 3 aired on Star Suvarna and again the next year in 2015 she participated in Halli Hyda Pyateg Banda Season 2 where she received attention as she became one of the finalists.

In 2021, she participated in Dance Jodi Dance Season 1 a dance competition reality television show broadcast on Zee Tamil along with a celebrity partner Mathan Pandian. The same year she appeared as a female protagonist named Meenakshi Karthik, in the soap-opera Namma Veetu Ponnu broadcast in Star Vijay, and her role in the drama was highly praised. Namma Veetu Ponnu was last aired on 25 March 2023 and after that she made a cameo appearance in Kaatrukkenna Veli as Shivani, the male lead character's one-sided lover.

In 2024, she again was cast as the lead female protagonist in the soap opera Thangamagal in Star Vijay for the role of Hasini, a quintessential "daddy's girl" is forced to take the role of a household maid in the village. She was also seen in the streaming television series Uppu Puli Kaaram, an official remake of the South Korean series My Father Is Strange.

== Filmography ==
=== Reality shows ===
Year	Show	Role	Language	Channel	Notes	Ref.
2014	Pyate Hudgir Halli Life Season 3	Contestant	Kannada	Star Suvarna		
2015	Halli Hyda Pyateg Banda Season 2	Contestant	Kannada	Star Suvarna	3rd runner-up	
2015	Athirshta Lakshmi	Contestant	Tamil	Zee Tamil		
2016-2017	Dance Jodi Dance Season 1	Contestant	Tamil	Zee Tamil	along with Celebrity partner Madhan Pandian	
2022	Oo Solriya Oo Oohm Solriya	Contestant	Tamil	Star Vijay	Episode 16	
2022	Villathi Villain Naanga Vera Maari	Contestant	Tamil	Star Vijay		
2023	Anda Ka Kasam	Contestant	Tamil	Star Vijay	Episode 23	
2023	Start Music season 4	Contestant	Tamil	Star Vijay	Episode 20	
2024	Start Music season 5	Contestant	Tamil	Star Vijay	Episode 2; to promote Uppu Puli Kaaram	
2024	Cooku with Comali season 5	Guest	Tamil	Star Vijay	Episode 18; to promote Uppu Puli Kaaram	
2024	Pandigai Palagaram Are U Ready	Guest	Tamil	Star Vijay		
2024	Tik Tik Tik	Contestant	Tamil	Star Vijay		
2024	Company	Contestant	Tamil	Star Vijay		

=== Television serials ===
Year	Show	Role	Language	Channel	Note	Ref.
2021–2023	Namma Veetu Ponnu	Meenakshi Karthik	Tamil	Star Vijay		
2023	Bharathi Kannamma	Herself	Tamil	Star Vijay	Cameo appearance	
2023	Kaatrukkenna Veli	Shivani	Tamil	Star Vijay	Special appearance	
2024–2025	Thangamagal	Hasini alias Anjali	Tamil	Star Vijay		

=== Other works ===
Year	Title	Role	Platform	Language	Note	Ref.
2022	Ponmagal Vandaal - Cover Version	Lead Dancer	YouTube	Tamil	Released by Star Music	
2023	Vaadi Vaadi	Lead cast	YouTube	Tamil	Music Video co-starring Arun Karthi	
2024	Uppu Puli Kaaram	Keerthi	Disney+ Hotstar	Tamil	Web-series	

== Awards and nominations ==
Awards and nominations received by Ashwini Aanandita
Year	Award	Category	Work	Result	Ref.
2023	8th Annual Vijay Television Awards	Best Daughter-in-law	Namma Veetu Ponnu	Nominated	

== See also ==
- List of Indian television actresses
