= Sethu (film) =

1999 Indian film by Bala

- Theatrical release poster
- Directed by: Bala
- Written by: Bala
- Produced by: A. Kandasamy
- Starring: Vikram; Abitha
- Cinematography: R. Rathnavelu
- Edited by: Raghu Babu
- Music by: Ilaiyaraaja
- Production company: Sharmatha Productions
- Release date: 10 December 1999
- Running time: 130 minutes
- Country: India
- Language: Tamil

Sethu (/seɪθu/) is a 1999 Indian Tamil-language romantic drama tragedy film, written and directed by Bala (in his directorial debut). The film stars Vikram and Abitha. The score and soundtrack were composed by Ilaiyaraaja, with cinematography by R. Rathnavelu and editing by Raghu Baabu.

Sethu, released on 10 December 1999, initially began running as a single noon show in a suburban theatre, but gradually built up audiences through word-of-mouth publicity. The film became a sleeper hit and Vikram's first major breakthrough film. It won the National Film Award for Best Tamil Feature Film and the Best Film award at the Filmfare Awards and the Cinema Express Awards. Bala and Vikram also won several awards for their contributions. The film was remade in Kannada as Huchcha, in Telugu as Seshu and in Hindi as Tere Naam.

== Plot ==
The film centres around Sethu, a tough and macho college student nicknamed as Chiyaan, who leads the Student Union and has a violent temper. He lives with his older brother Vasudevan, a magistrate whom he does not get along well. He roams with his circle of "yes sir" friends. Only his sister-in-law seems to truly understand him.

The story begins with Sethu winning the Student Union election as college chairman and getting into a fight with his rival contenders during the celebrations. Sethu is shown to be an aggressive and violent young man. But he begins to change after meeting Abitha, a timid Brahmin girl. Initially teasing her, he grows fond of her innocence and falls in love. Even his friends notice a positive change in him. Sethu also uses his college chairman powers to help Abitha to take an exam she had been earlier denied.

Meanwhile, Abitha’s sister returns home after facing dowry abuse from her husband. She struggles to repay a loan and rebuild her life. Around the same time, Sethu awkwardly confesses his love to Abitha. She is completely stunned and unable to respond, but Sethu assumes she reciprocates. He later learns she is engaged to a quiet and submissive priest. Feeling insecure, he threatens the priest to back off and the priest complies out of fear.

One day, when Sethu tries to present a romantic gift to Abitha, she openly rejects him and lets him know that she does not view him in such way. Unable to bear the truth, he lashes out at her which prompts her to scold him. Feeling dejected, he spends the night drinking with his friends who advise him to shed his rough behavior and to behave more timid in front of her. The next day, Sethu beats up his rival at the college who earlier bullied his friend but stops short at the last minute after seeing Abitha, who had witnessed it. His friends noticing the profound effect in him, confront him about his loyalty to their friendship where tempers flare up where Sethu gets into a scuffle with them after one of the friend passes a crude remark about Abitha. Realizing that his love for Abitha is causing him to act recklessly, he later apologizes and makes amends to his friends. However, he still continues his days remaining heartbroken about Abitha.

At this juncture, Sethu discovers and busts a local brothel operation where a patron had misbehaved with his friend's sister. He beats the brothel owners up and informs the police for raid. While searching one of the brothel rooms, he accidentally stumbles into Abitha’s sister who is completely unaware that she had been conned into prostitution in exchange for her dowry loan. Sethu is unaware about her identity as Abitha's sister as well. While initially scornful and mistaking her for a prostitute, he quickly realizes she is innocent and rescues her discretely. Grateful for the help, she tells Sethu about her dowry abuse and about her husband after he enquires her. Sethu than goes off into the night. Meanwhile, Abitha's fiancé who had witnessed the entire incident and the grave help Sethu had done that night, comes to understand his good morals. The next day, Sethu beats up the Abitha's sister husband and threatens him to accept his wife back, which he does. Realising his altruistic character, Abitha's fiance explains to Abitha about Sethu's role on that fateful night where he rescued her sister. He also points out to her that his priest profession would not sustain her life with him. Hearing this, Abitha realises that Sethu, despite his roughness, has a good heart.

However, Sethu, desperate and impulsive, kidnaps Abitha to an abandoned building and expresses his deep feelings for her. Understanding the depth of his love, Abitha finally succumbs to his love and accepts him. His love finally succeeded, Sethu is overjoyed and ecstatic about his newfound love.

Just when things seem to turn in Sethu’s favour, he is suddenly attacked by the brothel goons who seek revenge on him for trying to ruin their business. They brutally assault him and take turns to beat him up. Sethu is completely overpowered in the fight and gets crippled to the ground. They then drag his body and smash his head with blunt force on a rock, bloodying his head. The severe impact causes a small region of his brain to lacerate and suffer critical damage to its insides. They then dump his body on the rock leaving him in a bloody and gruesome condition.

Sethu is admitted into a mental institution where his condition is considered beyond recovery by the doctors. He is then sent to a remote mental asylum at Yerwardi where the traditional ayurvedic treatment might prove a chance to cure him.

Sethu's life completely flips upside down where at the ashram, he is barely recognisable. He is shaven bald, emaciated and chained to the walls wearing tattered clothing. Gradually over time, his brain heals from the injuries and Sethu recovers back to normal. However, his pleas on being recovered falls on deaf ears. His attempt to escape backfires as he obtains serious wounds on his leg after suffering a fall. Abitha who has not seen him for a long time, visits him secretly, but leaves distraught at his condition. Ironically, Sethu recognises her upon waking up and tries to call out to her but she leaves unable to hear him due to the screams and noises of the other patients in the asylum.

Convinced Sethu will never return to normal, Abitha’s father and Sethu's brother Vasudevan persuade her to marry her former fiancé. Abitha is deeply distraught and torn between the decisions. Meanwhile, Sethu attempts to escape again and this time round, he is successful. He limps to Abitha’s house to reunite with her. But there, he finds marriage decorations and a crowd. Confused and disoriented, he makes his way in to catch a glimpse and finally he sees Abitha lying on the ground still, adorned with garlands with people crying over her - she had committed suicide.

Devastated and deeply distraught, Sethu limps away in silence. His friends and family run after him in tears, but he doesn’t respond nor sees them. The ashram wardens arrive and take him back. The film ends with Sethu stepping into the van to head back to the mental asylum as he has no reason to live after losing his true love.

== Cast ==
- Vikram as Sethu a.k.a. Chiyaan
- Abitha as Abitha Kujalambal (voice dubbed by Savitha Reddy)
- Sivakumar as Vasudevan
- Sriman as Das
- Anju Mahendran as Sethu's friend
- Sriram as Sriram
- Vijaya Bharathi (aka Bharathi) as Latha
- Lavanya as Kamakshi, Abitha's sister
- Rasheed Ummer as Abitha's brother-in-law
- Mohan Vaithya as Abitha's uncle
- Manobala as Tamil Teacher
- Rajashree as Raji
- Hemalatha as Vasudevan's daughter
- Kavitha Tinku as Abitha's friend
- S. S. Raman as Abitha's father
- Anwar Alikhan as Brothel goon
- Jyothi Lakshmi as the old lady dancer in the "Gaana Karunkuyile" song
- Sasikumar as a college student (uncredited role)
- Ameer Sultan as a college student (uncredited role)

== Production ==
=== Development ===
After working as an assistant director under Balu Mahendra for seven years, Bala decided to make his directorial debut and wrote a script loosely based on an incident involving of one of his friends who had fallen in love, lost his mind and ended up at a mental asylum. The film, produced by A. Kandasamy, was initially titled Akilan but eventually retitled Sethu. Cinematography was handled by R. Rathnavelu and editing by Raghu Babu.

=== Casting ===
Bala offered the lead role of Sethu to his then roommate Vignesh, who did not accept. Murali and J. D. Chakravarthy was also considered, but the role ultimately went to Vikram. Keerthi Reddy was initially signed on as the lead actress, but was later replaced by Rajshri and then subsequently Abitha. To prepare for the character, Vikram shaved his head, thinned down to half his size by losing 21 kilograms and grew out his nails and even exposed himself under the sun for hours for skin darkening as the script demanded it. Vikram lived off fruit juice for six months and once he lost the desired weight, he maintained the look by subsisting on a scanty diet: an egg white, one glass of beetroot or carrot juice and a single dry chapati through the day. Bala dissuaded Vikram from accepting other film offers during this period and also asked him to cease working as a dubbing artist. M. S. Bhaskar lent his voice for S. S. Raman who appeared as a temple priest.

=== Filming ===
The film's launch was held in April 1997 and production lasted close to two years as the film languished in production hell. The FEFSI strike of 1997 halted filming across the Tamil film industry from June to December 1997 and as a small budget film, Sethu was unable to progress during the period. When the strike was called off, the producer left the project. Vikram and Bala's then assistant, Ameer Sultan, pled with the producer to return, with filming resuming in January 1998. After further slow progression, the film was finally completed by June 1999. Cinematographer R. Rathnavelu said he gave the asylum scenes a predominantly green tone for the intense psychological impact.

The filming was primarily held at Kumbakonam where scenes were shot at Vishnupuram, Konerirajapuram, Udayalur and Thyagarajapuram agraharam while scenes in the asylum were shot at Thiruvizhimizhilai Veezhinadeswarar temple and Thiruvidaimarudhur Maha Lingasamy temple. To film the scenes of the title character's college, the makers checked at least 60 colleges before finalising one in Kumbakonam. They were unable to secure permission to film in mental institutions and could not afford to create sets resembling those places, so they filmed in temples instead.

== Soundtrack ==
The music was composed by Ilaiyaraaja. The music rights were later bought by Sony Music South.

Track listing
No.	Title	Lyrics	Singer(s)	Length
1.	"Enge Sellum Intha"	Arivumathi	Ilaiyaraaja	05:07
2.	"Gaana Karunkuyile"	Ponnadiyan	Kovai Kamala	05:13
3.	"Kadhalenna Kadhalenna"	Palani Bharathi	Swarnalatha	05:13
4.	"Maalai En Vethanai"	Arivumathi	P. Unnikrishnan, Arunmozhi, S. N. Surendar	05:04
5.	"Saranam Bhava"		Sujatha	01:59
6.	"Sethuvukku Sethuvukku"	Mu. Metha	Arunmozhi	02:27
7.	"Sikaadha Sitrondru"	Palani Bharathi	P. Unnikrishnan, Arunmozhi, S. N. Surendar	05:12
8.	"Vaarthai Thavari Vittai"	Arivumathi	Ilaiyaraaja	03:01
9.	"Nenachu Nenachu"	Mu. Metha	P. Unnikrishnan	00:47
Total length:				34:03

== Release ==
The film struggled to find a distributor and only after sixty-seven screenings did the film manage to find a buyer, with most refusing the film due to its perceived tragic climax. At that time, Bala and Vikram used money from Vikram's wife, Shailaja, to organise press previews. Despite garnering good reviews, no one was interested in purchasing the film and it remained finished but unreleased. The film ultimately released on 10 December 1999, and initially began running at a single noon show in a suburban theatre, but gradually built up audiences through word-of-mouth publicity, becoming a sleeper hit. The film ran over 100 days at several cinema halls across Chennai, with Vikram being mobbed by people on the streets as a result of the film's success.

=== Critical reception ===
Sethu received positive reviews from critics. Malathi Rangarajan of The Hindu wrote, "AN AWARD winning performance by Vikram, a clear storyline, taut screenplay, powerful dialogues, crisp direction, superb background score – Sethu offers all these and much more". K. N. Vijayan from the New Straits Times described the film as an "unforgettable experience" and described Vikram's performance as "praise-worthy". Kanchana Prakash Rao of Kalki praised the first half but felt the film loses credibility after Sethu gets hurt, panning the film's second half and the ending. Thamarai Manalan of Dinakaran wrote, "Bala, who has directed this film, having himself written the story, screenplay and dialogue, has given a complete, perhaps more than complete, film that throbs with poetic eloquence and thus has uniformly stunned the audiences".

=== Accolades ===
Sethu won the National Film Award for Best Tamil Feature Film, while also securing wins in the Best Film – Tamil category at the Filmfare Awards and the Cinema Express Awards. Bala won the Tamil Nadu State Film Award for Best Director and the Filmfare Award for Best Director – Tamil. The performance also drew accolades for Vikram who won the Filmfare Special Award – South and the Tamil Nadu State Film Award Special Prize for his portrayal of the title character. He was reportedly a strong contender for the National Film Award for Best Actor in a Leading Role but lost to Mohanlal. Bala won the Dinakaran Cinema Award for Best Newface Director.

== Legacy ==
Sethu was a milestone in Vikram's career. The film's success made Bala one of the most sought after directors in Tamil cinema. It continued the trend of films with themes that focused on realism and nativity. K. Jeshi, a journalist for The Hindu, placed it in the category of films which propagates social issues, like Kaadhal (2004), Veyil (2006), Mozhi (2007) and Paruthiveeran (2007). Post-Sethu, Vikram has said that the film would always remain close to him regardless of its commercial success and that it put him on the "right path", with Vikram choosing to adapt the prefix of Chiyaan to his screen name. Owing to its success, the film was remade in Kannada as Huchcha (2001), in Telugu as Seshu (2002), and in Hindi as Tere Naam (2003).

== Bibliography ==
- Dhananjayan, G. (2011). The Best of Tamil Cinema, 1931 to 2010: 1977–2010. Galatta Media. OCLC 733724281.
