= Uppu Puli Kaaram =

- Poster
- Genre: Romantic; Family; Comedy; Drama
- Based on: My Father Is Strange by Lee Jung Sun
- Screenplay by: A. C. Karnamurthy; Dialogues: Arunbharathy; Albin Prashanth Raj
- Story by: Ananda Vikatan
- Directed by: M. Ramesh Baarathi; Chidambaram Manivannan
- Starring: Ponvannan; Vanitha Krishnachandran; Naveen Muralidhar; Ayesha Zeenath; Ashwini Aanandita; Deepika Venkatachalam; Krishna Raghunandhan; Raj Ayappa; Pranav Mohan
- Theme music composer: Arun Suradhaa
- Composers: Sheik; MS Lamb; Balasarangan KC
- Country of origin: India
- Original language: Tamil
- No. of seasons: 1
- No. of episodes: 128

Production
- Executive producer: B. Radha
- Producers: B. Srinivasan; Raadhika Srinivasan
- Production locations: Chennai; Palakkad; Mumbai
- Cinematography: R. V. Parthiba Krishna; Manikandan Ramamoorthy
- Editors: P. M. Achuthan; Siddhartha Ravindranaath
- Camera setup: Multi-camera
- Running time: approx.20–22 minutes per episode
- Production company: Vikatan Televistas Pvt Ltd

Original release
- Network: Disney+ Hotstar
- Release: 30 May 2024 – 2 January 2025

Related
- My Father Is Strange; Brothers and Sisters

Uppu Puli Kaaram (transl. Salt Sour Spicy) is a 2024 Indian Tamil-language television series, which is an official remake of the South Korean series My Father Is Strange. Directed by M. Ramesh Baarathi and Chidambaram Manivannan for Disney+ Hotstar. The show revolves around modern love, with stories on relationships in the modern generation.

The principal characters of the series include Ponvannan, Vanitha Krishnachandran, Naveen Muralidhar, Ayesha Zeenath, Ashwini Aanandita, Deepika Venkatachalam, Krishna Raghunandhan, Farina Azad, Raj Ayyappa and Pranav Mohan. It is scheduled to premiere on Disney+ Hotstar on 30 May 2024 and ended with 128 episodes on 2 January 2025. It also airs on Star Vijay from 26 October 2025 on every Sunday at 5:00 PM. A spiritual successor of the web series titled Brothers and Sisters was released on 27 May 2025.

== Cast ==
- Ponvannan as Subramani/Kasinathan "Kasi" (Annam Mess owner), Subbu's husband, Udhay, Chinmayi, Keerthi and Yashika's father
  - Yashwanth Sathu as young Subramani/Kasinathan "Kasi"
- Vanitha Krishnachandran as Subbalakshmi "Subbu" (Annam Mess co-owner), Subramani/ Kasi's wife, Udhay, Chinmayi, Keerthi and Yashika's mother
  - Swetha as young Subbalakshmi "Subbu"
- Naveen Muralidhar as Udhay (IAS), Subramani/ Kasi and Subbu's son, Chinmayi's younger brother Keerthi and Yashika's elder brother, Suchi's husband
- Ayesha Zeenath as Chinmayi (Criminal Advocate), Kasi and Subbu's eldest daughter, Udhay's older sister, Keerthi and Yashika's elder sister, Shiva's wife
- Ashwini Aanandita as Keerthi (Gym trainer turned Sales & Marketing Head), Kasi and Subbu's second daughter, Udhay and Chinmayi's younger sister, Yashika's elder sister, Mahi's love interest
- Deepika Venkatachalam as Yashika (Intern in 7Star TV, Thippu's manager), Kasi and Subbu's youngest daughter, Udhay, Chinmayi and Keerthi's younger sister, Thippu's love interest turned wife
- Raj Ayappa in double role as
  - Thippu (Actor in 7Star TV), real Subramani and Yashoda's son, Yashika's love interest turned husband
  - Subramani, Thippu's father, Yashoda's deceased husband, Kasi's friend
- Krishna as Shiva (Non-fiction dept exec in 7Star TV), Chinmayi's husband, Kasi and Subbu's son-in-law, Chandrasekhar and Sharmila's son, Udhay, Keerthi and Yashika's brother-in-law
- Pranav Mohan as Mahendran "Mahi" (Gym trainer), Keerthi's love interest, Mohan's son, Raj's twin brother
- Sonia as Sharmila (Kasi and Subbu's premise owner), Chandrasekhar's wife, Shiva's mother, Chinmayi's mother-in-law
- P. R. Varalakshmi as Saroja Devi, Subbu and Kalyan's mother, Kasi and Ramya's mother-in-law, Udhay, Chinmayi, Keerthi and Yashika's grandmother
- KPY Yogi as Kalyan (Freelance photographer), Subbu's younger brother, Ramya Kalyan's husband, Gowtham's father, Udhay, Chinmayi, Keerthi and Yashika's maternal uncle
- Akhila Prakash as Ramya Kalyan, Kalyan's wife, Subbu's sister-in-law, Gowtham's mother
- Kannadhasan Shanmugam as Rajendran "Raj", Mahi's twin brother, Mohan's son
- Monkey Ravi as Sam
- Arvind Khathare as Chandrasekhar, Shiva's father, Sharmila's husband, Chinmayi's father-in-law
- Sheva Raj as George
- Ramnath as director
- KPY Thidiyan as Anirudh (7Star TV staff), Shiva's friend and colleague
- Ranjith Ayyasamy as Sunil, Thippu's co-actor
- VJ Kalyani as Sheela (7Star TV staff), Shiva and Anirudh's colleague
- Sheela as Sharmila's friend
- Param Guhanesh as Gowtham, Kalyan and Ramya Kalyan's son, Udhay, Chinmayi, Keerthi and Yashika's cousin, Saroja Devi's grandson
- Chandrasekar Koneru as Mohan, Mahi and Raj's father, Energy Drink Business Owner and CEO
- Priyadarshini Rajkumar as Yashoda, Thippu's mother and real Subramani's widowed wife
- Perarasu as Yashoda's lawyer (Cameo appearance)

== Soundtrack ==
The first theme song was released on 15 May 2024 on the Disney+ Hotstar YouTube Channel.

Track list
No.	Title	Lyrics	Music	Artist	Length
1.	"Uppu Puli Kaaram Kudumba Paatu உப்பு புளி காரம் குடும்ப பாட்டு"	Adesh Krishna	Arun Suradhaa	Sharanya Srinivas; Anjana Balakrishnan; Deepak Blue; Arun Suradhaa	0:39
