= Uthiripookkal (TV series) =

- Cover photo
- Genre: Soap opera
- Written by: E. Vikkiramaathithan; C.U .Muthuchelvan
- Screenplay by: C. U. Muthuchelvan Dialogues by Pa. Raghavan
- Directed by: E. Vikkiramaathithan
- Creative director: Sujatha Vijayakumar
- Starring: Chetan; Vadivukkarasi; Manasa
- Theme music composer: Ilakkiyan (Title Song); Kiran (Background Score)
- Opening theme: "Ulladhellam Solla Poren"; Solar Sai (Vocal); Yugabharathi (Lyrics)
- Country of origin: India
- Original language: Tamil
- No. of seasons: 1
- No. of episodes: 476

Production
- Producers: Sujataa Vijaykumar; K.Vijaykumar
- Editor: Singai V. Raju
- Camera setup: Sakithya Seenu
- Running time: approx. 20-22 minutes per episode
- Production company: Home Movie Makers

Original release
- Network: Sun TV
- Release: 14 November 2011 – 4 October 2013

Uthiri Pookal is a 2011 Tamil-language soap opera that aired on Sun TV from 14 November 2011 to 4 October 2013 on Monday through Friday at 06:30PM (IST) for 476 episodes. It had been receiving the highest ratings of Tamil serials and received high praising from viewers.

The show starring by Chetan, Vadivukkarasi, Maanasa Hemachandran, Sharavan, Karna, Sadhasivam, Harikrishnan and producer by Home Movie Makers Sujataa Vijaykumar, K.Vijaykumar and directed by E. Vikkiramaathithan.

It is the story of a good individual who adopts three children and brings them up with care and affection. It was also aired in Sri Lanka Tamil Channel on Shakthi TV. The show was re-telecastied from March 1, 2021, to March 25, 2022, at 09:00AM (Indian Standard Time).Chetan's performance as Sivanesan was highly praised by the viewers and the show received highest ratings at 6.30 pm slot. Chetan won the Tamil Nadu state award for his portrayal of Sivanesan. Uthiripookal was selected as best serial of 2012 and won the Tamil Nadu state award.The show was retelecasted at the same channel from May 30, 2026 at 9:00 AM.

== Cast ==
Main

- Chetan as Sivanesan
- Vadivukkarasi as Alamelu
- Manasa as Sakthi
- Shravan Dwaraganath as Lakshmipathy

Recurring

- Akila Prakash as Sushi
- Shamilly Sukumar as Megha
- Hari Ruthran as Dilipan
- L. Raja as Dhakshinamoorthy
- Srilekha as Valliammai
- Revathypriya as Karuna
- Nithya Ravindran as Manonmani
- Dev Anand Sharma as Sathish
- Shyaam as Elango
- Shabnam as Shalini
- Mahalakshmi as Priya
- Bharathy as Bhagya Lakshmi
- Roopa Shree as Jamuna
- Srirubi as Nila
- Swetha as Suguna
- Revathi Priya as Karuna
- Karna as Sadhasivam
- Sadhasivam as Pandi Durai

== Awards and nominations ==
Year	Award	Category	Recipient	Role	Result
2012	Sun Kudumbam Viruthugal	Best Editor	Singa V. Raja		Nominated
2012	Sun Kudumbam Viruthugal	Dubbing Artist Male	Vijayakumar		Nominated
2012	Sun Kudumbam Viruthugal	Best Background Music	Kiran		{(Won
2012	Sun Kudumbam Viruthugal	Best Son in-Law	Sarvan	Laksupathi	Nominated
2012	Sun Kudumbam Viruthugal	Best Supporting Actor Award	Sarvan	Laksupathi	Nominated
2017	Tamil Nadu State Television Awards for 2012	Best Serial	Uthiripookal		Won
2017	Tamil Nadu State Television Awards for 2012	Best Actor	Chetan	Shivanesh	Won
2017	Tamil Nadu State Television Awards for 2013	Best Editor	V. Karthik		Won
2017	Tamil Nadu State Television Awards for 2013	Best Music Director	Elakkaiyan		Won
2017	Tamil Nadu State Television Awards for 2013	Best Director	E. Vikkiramaathithan		Won
