= Vikatan Group =

Indian news magazine

- Founded: 1926; 100 years ago
- Headquarters: Chennai
- Key people: S. S. Vasan
- Website: www.vikatan.com

The Vikatan Group is an Indian media conglomerate based in Chennai, Tamil Nadu. Its flagship Tamil-language weekly magazine Ananda Vikatan was launched in 1926.

== History ==
Ananda Vikatan was started by Pudhoor Vaidyanadha Iyer in February 1926 as a monthly publication. The issue for December 1927 was not published due to financial difficulties. In January 1928, S. S. Vasan bought the rights from Iyer and relaunched the publication in February 1928 in a new format. He paid ₹200 (equivalent to ₹49,000 or US$510 in 2026) at the rate of ₹25 per letter in the Tamil-language name (ஆனந்த விகடன்) of the publication to buy the rights. He built it into a weekly and sales soon rose. Veteran journalist, media personality and Vasan's son S. Balasubramanian served as editor, managing director and publisher of the magazine for nearly fifty years till 2006. He also started the "Manavar Thittam" or student journalism scheme that has been active for the last thirty years and counting. He also launched Junior Vikatan, a biweekly Tamil investigative journal in the 1980s. Balasubramanian later served as chairman emeritus of the Vikatan Group after retiring from active involvement and handing over the reins to his son B. Srinivasan.

== Publications ==
Ananda Vikatan is the group's flagship magazine. It also publishes various other magazines including Aval Vikatan, Chutti Vikatan, Doctor Vikatan, Junior Vikatan, Motor Vikatan, Naanayam Vikatan, Pasumai Vikatan, Sakthi Vikatan and TimePass. Cinema Vikatan is the group's YouTube channel that covers cinema.

== Visual media ==
=== Television ===
Vikatan Televistas was launched by Vasan Publications in the late 1990s starting with Tamil mega-serials on Sun TV such as Thirumathi Selvam and Thendral. From 2008 to 2016, they have also produced Telugu, Malayalam and Kannada serials for Gemini TV, Surya TV and Udaya TV respectively, all of which are part of the Sun TV Network. In 2020, during the COVID-19 pandemic it withdrew from Sun TV and decided to move and proceed with other channels, too. Since 2021, it has produced and made stories for Star Vijay. It debuted with shows such as Thamizhum Saraswatiyum and Siragadikka Aasai. In 2023, it also debuted in Kalaignar TV with the show Ranjithame.

In 2024, Vikatan Televistas debuted in Hindi television industry by co-producing Udne Ki Aasha for StarPlus.

TV serials produced by Vikatan
Name	First aired	Last aired	Number of episodes	Network	Language
Akshaya	1999		50	Sun TV	Tamil
Panchavarnakilli	2000			Sun TV	Tamil
Pushpanjali	2000		38	Sun TV	Tamil
Anandha Bhavan	2000		60	Sun TV	Tamil
Alaigal	29 October 2001	23 May 2003	403	Sun TV	Tamil
Avargal	6 January 2003	2 November 2007	1077	Sun TV	Tamil
Appa	26 May 2003	21 November 2003	125	Sun TV	Tamil
Kolangal	24 November 2003	4 December 2009	1533	Sun TV	Tamil
Alli Rajyam	16 May 2005	21 July 2006	60	Sun TV	Tamil
Thirumathi Selvam	5 November 2007	22 March 2013	1360	Sun TV	Tamil
Nilavilakku	1 January 2008	8 November 2011	1006	Surya TV	Malayalam
Devatha	12 January 2009	31 May 2013	1142	Gemini TV	Telugu
Thendral	7 December 2009	17 January 2015	1340	Sun TV	Tamil
Sravani Subrahmanyam	18 July 2011	27 July 2012	266	Gemini TV	Telugu
Ilam Thennal Pole	28 November 2011	20 July 2012	170	Surya TV	Malayalam
Thangali	5 December 2011	4 October 2013	472	Udaya TV	Kannada
Deivamagal	25 March 2013	17 February 2018	1466	Sun TV	Tamil
Bhagyalakshmi	3 February 2014	27 August 2016	804	Surya TV	Malayalam
Priyamanaval	19 January 2015	11 May 2019	1315	Sun TV	Tamil
Nayaki	19 February 2018	31 October 2020	718	Sun TV	Tamil
Run	5 August 2019	30 March 2020	197	Sun TV	Tamil
Thamizhum Saraswathiyum	12 July 2021	19 April 2024	717	Star Vijay	Tamil
Siragadikka Aasai	23 January 2023		1000+	Star Vijay	Tamil
Ranjithame	17 July 2023	14 December 2024	436	Kalaignar TV	Tamil
Budget Kudumbam	22 January 2024	7 March 2025	100	DD Podhigai	Tamil
Udne Ki Aasha	12 March 2024		800+	StarPlus	Hindi
Chinnanchiru Kiliye	21 June 2025 (only initial concept)		250+	Zee Tamil	Tamil
Kanaa Kandenadi	19 January 2026	26 June 2026	121	Star Vijay	Tamil

=== Films ===
The company ventured into film production as Vikatan Talkie with the comedy film Siva Manasula Sakthi, starring Jiiva and Anuya, in 2009. It was followed by the commercially unsuccessful film Vaalmiki in the same year. The media house still produces a variety of programs for television and has branched out into various streams of media content with an online digital broadcast of snippets of news, views, interviews, etc.

=== Web series ===
Name	First aired	Last Aired	Number of episodes	Network
November Story	2021	2021	7	Disney+ Hotstar (Tamil)
Uppu Puli Kaaram	30 May 2024	2 January 2025	128	Disney+ Hotstar (Tamil)
Brothers and Sisters	27 May 2026	present	4	JioHotstar (Tamil)
Lingam	26 June 2026	present	8	JioHotstar (Tamil)

== Ananda Vikatan Awards ==
The awards ceremony has been held since 2008, with the most recent being in January 2019.
