= Brothers and Sisters (2026 TV series) =

Indian TV series

- Genre: Romantic; Family; Comedy; Drama
- Screenplay by: A. C. Karnamurthy; Dialogues: Albin Prashanth Raj; Rajkamal Bharathi
- Story by: A. C. Karnamurthy
- Directed by: Chidambaram Manivannan
- Starring: Bose Venkat; Gayathri Shastry; Pramodini Pammi; Nikhila Sankar; Luthuf; Shravnitha Srikanth; Kishore; Riyan Joe Jerry; Raj Ayyappa; Siddharth Babu; Namritha MV
- Composer: Saran Raghavan
- Country of origin: India
- Original language: Tamil
- No. of seasons: 1
- No. of episodes: 100

Production
- Executive producer: Jyothishna M
- Producers: Raadhika Srinivasan; B. Srinivasan
- Production locations: Chennai; Mysore; Ahmedabad
- Cinematography: Manikandan Ramamoorthy
- Editor: B. Chandru
- Running time: approx.20–22 minutes per episode
- Production company: Vikatan Televistas Pvt Ltd

Original release
- Network: JioHotstar
- Release: 27 May – 11 November 2026

Related
- Uppu Puli Kaaram

Brothers and Sisters is an Indian Tamil-language romantic family comedy drama television series, which is an spiritual successor of the web series Uppu Puli Kaaram (2024). This series is directed by Chidambaram Manivannan for JioHotstar. The story revolves around a close-knit but secret-laden family as a brother and his three sisters embark on a hilarious, emotional mission to manage their father.

The principal characters of the series include Bose Venkat, Gayathri Shastry, Pramodini Pammi, Nikhila Sankar, Luthuf, Shravnitha Srikanth, Kishore, Riyan Joe Jerry, Raj Ayyappa, Siddharth Babu and Namritha MV. It premiered on JioHotstar on 27 May 2026 and ended on 11 November 2026 after 100 episodes

== Plot ==
The Ponmalar household, led by the strict textile businessman Shanmuga Sundaram "SS" and his warm-hearted wife Ponmalar, appears happy and tightly knit on the surface. They have four children with distinct personalities: Jayshree (a lawyer), Harini(an IT employee), Jagadeesh "Jaggu" (a DJ), and Meera (an aspiring cricketer).

Their peaceful routines are upended when a shocking revelation emerges: their father has a hidden affair. United by their love for their mother and a desire to protect their family, the siblings band together, taking an oath to expose the affair and shield their family from breaking apart.

== Cast ==
- Bose Venkat as Shanmuga Sundaram "SS" (Ponmalar Textiles owner): Ponmalar's first husband, Girija's second husband, Jayshree, Harini, Meera, Jaggu's father and Madhu's stepfather
- Gayathri Shastry as Ponmalar: Shanmuga Sundaram's first wife, Jayshree, Harini, Meera and Jaggu's mother, Madhu's stepmother and Azhagar's sister
- Pramodini Pammi as Girija: Shanmuga Sundaram's second wife and Mohan's ex-wife, Madhu's mother and Jayshree, Harini, Meera and Jaggu's stepmother
- Nikhila Sankar as Jayshree (Lawyer): Shanmuga Sundaram and Ponmalar's eldest daughter, Girija's stepdaughter, Harini, Meera and Jagadeesh's elder sister, Madhu's stepsister, Priyan's love interest and Manoj's ex-lover
- Luthuf as Harini (IT Employee): Shanmuga Sundaram and Ponmalar's second daughter, Girija's stepdaughter, Jayshree, Meera and Jaggu's sister, Madhu's stepsister and Siddharth's love interest
- Shravnitha Srikanth as Meera (Aspiring Cricketer): Shanmuga Sundaram and Ponmalar's youngest daughter, Girija's stepdaughter, Jayshree, Harini and Jaggu's sister, Madhu's stepsister and Ashwin's friend and love interest and Vivek's friend
- Kishore as Jagadeesh "Jaggu" (DJ): Shanmuga Sundaram and Ponmalar's son, Girija's stepson, Jayshree, Harini and Meera's brother, Madhu's stepbrother, Meenu's love interest
- Namritha MV as Madhumitha "Madhu" (Event Management Head): Girija and Mohan's daughter and Shanmuga Sundaram's stepdaughter, Ponmalar's stepdaughter, Jayshree, Harini and Meera's stepsister and Jaggu's stepsister, Jayshree and Vivek's friend
- Riyan Joe Jerry as Priyadarshan "Priyan" (Car Mechanic Head): Jayshree's love interest and Manoj's ex-friend
- Raj Ayyappa as Siddharth "Siddhu" (HR Head): Velpandi and Kalavathi's son, Harini's love interest and Stephen and Roshni's friend
- Siddharth Babu as Ashwin (Aspiring Cricketer): Punniyakodi and Lakshmi's son, Meera and Vivek's friend
- Shaliny as Meenakshi "Meenu": Jaggu's love interest and Thangam's daughter
- Ayaz Khan as Vivek (Photographer): Meera, Madhu and Ashwin's friend
- RJ Munna as Ganesan: Preethi's husband and Priyan's brother-in-law
- Jayshree Senthil as Preethi: Ganeshan's wife and Priyan's sister
- Bhanu Prakash as Velpandi (Commissioner of Police): Kalavathi's husband and Siddharth's father
- Tharini as Kalavathi: Velpandi's wife and Siddharth's mother
- Soundar as Punniyakodi (Astrologer): Lakshmi's husband and Ashwin's father
- Manimegalai as Lakshmi: Punniyakodi's wife and Ashwin's mother
- Vijayasarathy as Mohan: Madhu's biological father and Girija's estranged husband
- Ranjana Nachiyaar as Thangam (Gangster): Meenu's mother
- Hamar Nath as Stephen (IT Employee): Siddharth, Harini and Roshini's friend
- Syama Harini as Reshmi (Lawyer): Jayshree and Manoj's friend
- Ramesh Aravind as Manoj (Lawyer): Jayshree's ex-boyfriend and Priyan's ex-friend
- Ridaah as Roshni (HR Head's PA): Siddharth, Harini and Stephen's friend
- Reka Raj as Rekha (Textiles staff): Shanmuga Sundaram's staff member
- Hitesh S. Bharadwaaj as Sasi (DJ): Jaggu's friend
- Praveen Kumar as Meera and Ashwin's cricket coach
- Jinadhattan as Saba: Priyan's colleague

== Production ==
=== Development ===
In April 2026, JioHotstar announced Brothers and Sisters, a Tamil family drama web series created and directed by Chidambaram Manivannan. The series was developed as a spiritual successor to Uppu Puli Kaaram (2024), with Manivannan returning to explore themes of family relationships, sibling bonds and everyday domestic life through a new story and set of characters and positioning it as a continuation of the long-format family storytelling style popularized by the earlier series. The technical crew included music director Saran Raghavan, cinematographer Manikandan Ramamoorthy and art director Vasu Dhevan.

The series is directed by Chidambaram Manivannan and written by A. C. Karnamurthy. It is produced by Vikatan Televistas, a production company known for producing Tamil television serials such as Siragadikka Aasai, Thamizhum Saraswathiyum and Uppu Puli Kaaram.

=== Casting ===
The series stars Bose Venkat and Gayathri Shastry were cast in the lead roles, alongside Raj Ayyappa, Nikhila Sankar, Luthuf, Kishore, Shravnitha Srikanth, Siddharth Babu, Pramodini Pammi and Namritha MV.

=== Release ===
The first trailer was released on 25 April 2026, featuring the Ponmalar family as they navigate personal conflicts and unexpected challenges arising from a long-buried family secret.

It was announced that the series would be released in Tamil and other Indian languages and made its streaming debut on 27 May 2026.

== Reception ==
Siddartha Toleti of M9 News wrote that, "On a hot, summer day with overwhelming viewing options, Brothers and Sisters is a safe, convenient choice, tailored for family-friendly viewing. The story is minimal, the atmosphere is light, it deals with relatable characters in a few stock situations and has its target audience entertained without trying too hard". Sree of OTT Release wrote that, "Not a “perfect binge,” but definitely an emotionally messy, sometimes slow, sometimes powerful family drama. If you like stories that feel more real than refined, this one might stick with you longer than expected".
