= Krishna (TV actor) =

Indian actor

- Born: Krishna Raghunandan; 1 August 1982 (age 44); Chennai, Tamil Nadu, India
- Education: Kendriya Vidyalaya, Birla Institute of Technology, Noida
- Occupation: Actor
- Years active: 2001–present
- Known for: Deivamagal (2013–2018)
- Spouse: Chaya Singh (m. 2012)
- Parent(s): Raghunandan; Nalini Raghunandan

Krishna (born as Krishna Raghunandan) is an Indian film and television actor. He is best known for playing the lead role in the Deivamagal (2013–2018) as Prakash which telecasted on Sun TV.

== Early life and education ==
Krishna was born in Chennai. His parents had migrated from Tamil Nadu to New Delhi after his birth, and he grew up in New Delhi. He obtained his formal education from Kendriya Vidyalaya and Birla Institute of Technology, Noida. He also did a three-month course in acting from Asian Academy of Film & Television (AAFT) Noida.

== Career ==
After completing his degree in Delhi, he flew to Chennai to begin a career in acting. His first role was in the Tamil serial Sahana, a sequel of Sindhu Bhairavi directed by K. Balachander. He portrayed the character Surya, son of JKB.

Krishna was offered to perform the role of a cancer patient in Kamal Haasan starrer Vasool Raja MBBS but couldn't sign the project. He was later offered a role in director Saran's Idhaya Thirudan. In 2010 he played a negative role named Jeeva in the Tamil movie Anandhapurathu Veedu.

He acted in the TV serial Deivamagal where he played the protagonist role of Prakash, and in the suspense-thriller serial, Chidambara Rahasiyam where he played the character Somu both broadcast on Sun TV. In 2019 he acted in the TV serial Run. In 2020 Krishna acted in Nayagi (Season 2) as Ezhil. He now is acting in Thalattu.

== Personal life ==
He is married to Indian actress Chaya Singh. Their marriage was held in June 2012.

== Filmography ==
Year	Film	Role	Notes
2006	Azhagiya Asura	Sanjay	
2006	Idhaya Thirudan	Krishna	
2006	Oru Kadhal Seiveer	Anand	
2008	Pathu Pathu	P. T. Arun	
2009	Balam	Balaji	
2009	Eeram	Mr. X	
2010	Anandhapurathu Veedu	Jeeva	
2025	Pallavapuram Manai En 666	Tharun	

== Television ==
Serials

Year	Title	Role	Language	Channel
2003–2004	Sahana	Surya	Tamil	Jaya TV
2004–2006	Chidambara Rahasiyam	Someshwaran	Tamil	Sun TV
2005	Selvi	Chandru	Tamil	Sun TV
2007	Naan Aval Illai	Murali	Tamil	Kalaignar TV
2008	Alaipayuthe	Srikanth	Tamil	Jaya TV
2011	No.23 Mahalakshmi Nivasam	Rohit	Telugu	Gemini TV
2012–2014	Kanchana Ganga	Akash	Telugu	Maa TV
2012–2015	Sivasankari	Rudran	Tamil	Sun TV
2013–2018	Deivamagal	Prakash	Tamil	Sun TV
2019–2020	Run	Shakthivel	Tamil	Sun TV
2020	Nayagi	Ezhil	Tamil	Sun TV
2021–2023	Thalattu	Vijayakrishnan	Tamil	Sun TV
2021	Kannana Kanne	Vijayakrishnan (Special Appearance)	Tamil	Sun TV
2022	Aruvi	Himself (Special Appearance)	Tamil	Sun TV
2022	Ilakkiya	Vijayakrishnan (Special Appearance)	Tamil	Sun TV
2023–2024	Sundari	Vetrivelan	Tamil	Sun TV
2025–present	Vinodhini	Vasudevan	Tamil	Sun TV

Shows

Year	Title	Role	Language	Channel
2016	Comedy Junction	Himself	Tamil	Sun TV
2017	Asathal Chutties	Himself	Tamil	Sun TV
2020	Vanakkam Tamizha	Guest	Tamil	Sun TV
2020	Vanakkam Tamizha	Guest	Tamil	Sun TV
2021	Vanakkam Tamizha	Guest	Tamil	Sun TV
2021	Poova Thalaya	Contestant	Tamil	Sun TV
2021	Vanakkam Tamizha	Guest	Tamil	Sun TV
2022	Vanakkam Tamizha	Guest	Tamil	Sun TV
2022	Maathi Yosi	Contestant	Tamil	Sun TV
2022	Mathappu Mamiyar Pattas Marumagal	Vijayakrishnan	Tamil	Sun TV
2022	Vanakkam Tamizha	Guest	Tamil	Sun TV
2022	Super Samayal	Contestant	Tamil	Sun TV
2023	Puthandu Aasai	Vijayakrishnan	Tamil	Sun TV
2023	Vanakkam Tamizha	Guest	Tamil	Sun TV

Web Series

Year	Title	Role	Language	Network
2024–2025	Uppu Puli Kaaram	Shiva	Tamil	Disney+ Hotstar

=== Theatre ===
- Oru Koodai Paasam (2009) – Directed by K.Balachandher

== Awards and nominations ==
Year	Award	Category	Role	Result
2004	Mylapore Academy Awards	Best Actor Male Lead	Somu-Chidambara Rahasiyam	Won
2014	Sun Kudumbam Awards	Best Actor Male Lead	Prakash-Deivamagal	Nominated
2018	Galatta Nakshathra Awards	Best Actor Male Lead	Prakash-Deivamagal	Nominated
2018	Sun Kudumbam Awards	Best Actor Male Lead	Prakash-Deivamagal	Won
2018	Sun Kudumbam Awards	Best Popular Jodi ( shared with Vani Bhojan )	Prakash and Sathya-Deivamagal	Nominated
2019	Sun Kudumbam Awards	Best Popular Hero	Shakthi Vel-Run	Won
2022	Sun Kudumbam Viruthugal	Best Hero	Vijay-Thalattu	Won
2022	Sun Kudumbam Viruthugal	Best Couple	Vijay – Isai for Thalattu	Nominated
2022	Sun Kudumbam Viruthugal	Favourite Hero	Vijay – Thalattu	Nominated
