= Namma Veetu Ponnu =

2021 Indian Tamil-language TV series

- Genre: Drama
- Written by: Leena Gangopadhyay (dialogues); Sangeetha Mohan (episodes 1-69); S. Maruthu Shankar; Selva Vadivel (episodes 304-478)
- Directed by: Praveen Bennett (Episode 1-207); Gunasekhar (Episode 208-478)
- Starring: Surjith Kumar; Ashwini Aanandita
- Country of origin: India
- Original language: Tamil
- No. of episodes: 478

Production
- Executive producers: Ram Kumaradhas; Sharvani Kumaradhas; A. Abdullah; Ayesha Abdullah
- Producer: Saravanan
- Cinematography: Venkatesh
- Editor: R. Rajesh Kumar
- Camera setup: Multi-camera
- Running time: 22 minutes
- Production company: Global Villagers

Original release
- Network: Star Vijay
- Release: 16 August 2021 – 25 March 2023

Namma Veetu Ponnu (transl. The Girl from Our House) is a 2021 Indian television drama that premiered on Star Vijay and streams on Disney+ Hotstar. It was produced by Global Villagers. It is an official remake of Khorkuto, which aired on Star Jalsha. It was premiered on 16 August 2021 and ended on 25 March 2023 with 478 episodes.

== Synopsis ==
It is a family drama revolving around a girl, Meenakshi, who crosses paths with a scientist, Karthik who belongs to a middle-class joint family, and everything changes. Apart from a love story, It narrates the tale of a joint family, its roots, and beliefs.

"Namma Veettu Ponnu" intricately spins the tale of Karthik and Meenakshi, two individuals whose lives are shaped by vastly different backgrounds and temperaments. Karthik, the epitome of responsibility, is molded by the warmth and values of his tight-knit joint family. Raised amidst love and tradition, he holds deep reverence for familial bonds, a quality ingrained in his being. On the other hand, Meenakshi emerges from a solitary upbringing as the only child, her disposition colored by stubbornness and a fiery temper.

Their worlds collide unexpectedly at a family gathering, sparking a heated exchange that reveals the stark contrast in their personalities. Despite their initial clash, the chemistry between them is palpable, drawing the attention of their relatives who see potential in their union. Thus, begins the orchestration of plans to unite them in matrimony.

As the narrative unfolds, viewers are enveloped in the intricate web of fate as Karthik and Meenakshi navigate the complexities of their relationship. Will their divergent personalities find common ground amidst the trials they face? Can love transcend their differences, or will adversity threaten to tear them apart? These questions lie at the heart of their journey as they embark on a path toward discovering the true essence of companionship amidst the backdrop of family dynamics and personal growth.

== Cast ==
=== Main ===
- Ashwini Aanandita as Meenakshi Karthik – Chezhiyan and Gayatri's daughter; Divya's cousin; Anu's best friend; Karthi's wife
- Surjith Kumar (Season 1) → Arun (Season 2) as Karthik "Karthi" Vasudevan – Vasudevan and Nandini's son; Malar's brother; Shiva, Pavithra and Anu's cousin; Meenakshi's husband
- Srividya Natrajan as Sakthi, Velan’s wife - a woman who is determined to stand up for her rights in society.
- Vigneshwaran (Season 2) as Abi Velan and Sakthi's daughter

=== Supporting ===
- Sherin Jaanu / Lailaa as Divya – Selvi's daughter; Meenakshi's cousin; Karthi's best friend who one-sidedly loves him
- Ravi Chandran as Velayudham aka Velu – The Head of the Family; Vasudevan, Thiyagu and Paaru's brother; Visalam's husband; Shiva and Pavithra's father. Vadivu's father-in-law.
- Nithya Ravindran / Revathee Shankar as Visalatchi "Visalam" Velayudham – Velu's wife; Shiva and Pavithra's mother. Vadivu's mother-in-law.
- Tamil Selvi / Sri Priya as Nandhini Vasudevan – Vasudevan's wife; Karthi and Malar's mother. Meenakshi's mother-in-law.
- Venkat Subramanian as Thiyagarajan aka Thiyagu – Velu, Vasudevan and Paaru's brother; Kallu's husband; Anu's father
- VJ Sandhya as Kalyani "Kallu" Thiyagarajan – Thiyagu's wife; Anu's mother
- Amrutha Abishek as Parvathy aka Paaru – Velu, Vasudevan and Thiyagu's sister; Mahesh's wife
- Vetri Velan as Mahesh – Paaru's Husband
- Vaishali Taniga as Malarvizhi "Malar" Vasudevan Kalaiyarasan – Vasudevan and Nandhini's daughter; Karthi's sister; Shiva, Pavithra and Anu's cousin; Kalai's wife
- VJ Pappu as Kalaiyarasan aka Kalai – Devagi's son; Malar's husband
- Arunima Sudhakar as Anuradha "Anu" Thiyagarajan – Thiyagu and Kalyani's daughter; Shiva, Pavithra, Karthi and Malar's cousin; Meenakshi's best friend
- Praveen Nandagopal / Jack as Shivakanth "Shiva" Velayudham – Velu and Visalam's son; Pavithra's younger brother. Karthi, Malar and Anu's cousin; Vadivu's husband.
- Shabnam as Vadivukarasi "Vadivu" Shivakanth – Shiva's wife
- M. J. Shriram as Dr. Chezhiyan – Selvi's brother; Gayatri's husband; Meenakshi's father
- Priyadharshini / Banumathi as Selvi – Chezhiyan's sister; Divya's mother; Meenakshi's aunt
- Prakash Rajan as Divya's father and Selvi's estranged husband
- Sujatha Panju / Kiruba as Dr. Gayatri Chezhiyan – Chezhiyan's wife; Meenakshi's mother
- Manoj Kumar as Vasudevan – Velu, Thiyagu and Paaru's brother; Nandhini's husband; Karthi and Malar's father
- Magesh as Dinesh – Meenakshi's close friend
- Gayatri Devi as Devagi – Kalai's mother
- Salma as Devi – Mahesh's sister-in-law
- Arun (Season 1) as Bharathi – Pavithra’s son; Visalatchi and Velayadhum's grandson
- Yamuna Chinnadurai as Dr. Jeevapriya (Jeeva) – Meenakshi's collegemate

== Adaptations ==
Language	Title	Original release	Network(s)	Last aired	Notes	Ref.
Bengali	Khorkuto খড়কুটো	17 August 2020	Star Jalsha	21 August 2022	Original	
Tamil	Namma Veetu Ponnu நம்ம வீட்டு பொண்ணு	16 August 2021	Star Vijay	25 March 2023	Remake	
Marathi	Thipkyanchi Rangoli ठिपक्यांची रांगोळी	4 October 2021	Star Pravah	18 November 2023	Remake	
Malayalam	Palunku പളുങ്ക്	22 November 2021	Asianet	30 December 2022	Remake	
Hindi	Kabhi Kabhie Ittefaq Sey कभी कभी इत्तेफाक से	3 January 2022	StarPlus	20 August 2022	Remake	
Kannada	Jenugudu ಜೇನುಗೂಡು	21 February 2022	Star Suvarna	30 September 2023	Remake	
