= Azhagu =

- Directed by: K. Vijayan
- Produced by: A. Sundaram
- Starring: Sarath Babu; Sumathi; Rathi Devi
- Music by: G. K. Venkatesh
- Production company: Seshasayee Films
- Release date: 1984
- Country: India
- Language: Tamil

Azhagu (Tamil pronunciation: [aɻaɡu] transl. Beauty) is a 1984 Indian Tamil-language film directed by K. Vijayan and produced by A. Sundaram of Seshasayee Films. The film stars Sarath Babu, Sumathi and Rathi Devi.

== Cast ==
- Sarath Babu
- Sumathi
- Rathi Devi

== Soundtrack ==
Soundtrack was composed by G. K. Venkatesh. and Lyrics by Vaali

Track listing
No.	Title	Singer(s)	Length
1.	"Devi Vandaal"	S. P. Balasubrahmanyam, S. Janaki
2.	"Mounamulla Mayakkam"	P. Jayachandran, S. Janaki
3.	"Azhagenum"	P. Susheela

== Reception ==
Jayamanmadhan of Kalki wrote purely amateurish approach on one hand, aimless story structure on the other hand make the film toss and turn.
