= Thendral =

- Genre: Soap opera
- Screenplay by: Guru. Sampathkumar; C. U. Muthuselvan; Dialogues: Guru. Sampathkumar Ezhilvaradhan
- Story by: Ananda Vikatan
- Directed by: S. Kumaran
- Starring: Shruthi Raj; Deepak Dinkar; Hemalatha
- Theme music composer: Kiran
- Opening theme: "Poradave"; Karthik (Vocals); Yugabharathi (Lyrics)
- Country of origin: India
- Original language: Tamil
- No. of seasons: 1
- No. of episodes: 1,340

Production
- Producer: Vikatan Televistas Pvt Ltd
- Cinematography: S. T. Maads
- Editors: Sasi K. Basanth; G. V. Rajan; B. Chandru; S. Neilston; Palanisamy
- Camera setup: Multi-camera
- Running time: Approx. 20 minutes
- Production company: Vikatan Televistas Pvt Ltd

Original release
- Network: Sun TV
- Release: 7 December 2009 – 17 January 2015

Thendral (transl. Breeze) is a 2009 Indian Tamil-language soap opera that aired Monday through Friday on Sun TV. It was broadcast from 7 December 2009 to 17 January 2015 for 1,340 episodes. The show stars Shruthi Raj and Deepak Dinkar and revolves around a girl's struggle in a middle-class family, focusing on the importance of women's education. It was produced by Vikatan Televistas Pvt Ltd and directed by S. Kumaran. The show replaced Kolangal after it went off-air and was replaced by Priyamanaval in 2015.

Thendral was amongst the first Tamil serials to go viral on the internet. The Indian newspaper Business Standard described it as the "first youthful prime time daily soap in Tamil". Thendral has been highly acclaimed and has won many awards. After a nine-year hiatus, the show returned from 10 December 2018 on Vikatan Prime Time YouTube channel every day. It was re-telecasting on Colors Tamil and Kalaignar TV from 16 May 2022. From January 2026, the series had reboot as Kanaa Kandenadi which has aired in Vijay TV.

== Plot ==
This serial revolves around the main character Thulasi (Shruthi Raj). Thulasi's mother left her when she was a child for the sake of money and, ever since, her family has shunned her, especially her father and stepmother. The only family member that genuinely cares for her is her grandmother (S. N. Lakshmi). Thulasi's only dream is to continue her studies to become an engineer and help her family, and she gets the highest marks in her 12th board exams. Thulasi's father Muthumanikam a.k.a. Manikam (Subhalekha Sudhakar) dreams about seeing his son, Mohan (Ayyappan) becoming an engineer, yet his dreams are put on hold due to the lack of money. Knowing this, a break-inspector and a goon in his 40s, Velayudham (Nizhalgal Ravi) approaches them to help Manikam's dream come true, on one condition: that is if he agrees to get Thulasi married to him. A greedy Manickam coaxes Thulasi that the only way she can wipe away the sin committed by her mother, who had fled away with another man, is by marrying Velayudham. Stung by guilt, Thulasi agrees to marry Velayudham despite their age difference. Velayudham, in return, offers Manickam a massive amount of cash. But fate has other plans, and so by mistake, the photos of Thulasi and that of another girl Lavanya (Neelima Rani) mix up in a photo studio and ends up in the hands of the hero – Tamizharasu (Deepak Dinkar). Lavanya happens to be the sister of Tamizharasu. On seeing Thulasi's photo, she conveys that she would like to have a sister-in-law as beautiful as Thulasi. Attracted by Thulasi's beauty and the frequent taunts by Lavanya, Tamizharasu falls in love with Thulasi. Thulasi refuses to accept Tamizharasu's love and publicly insults him at his bank.

Meanwhile, Tamizharasu's mother wants him to marry a rich girl of her choice so that she can be the controller of her second daughter-in-law. Her relationship with the eldest-daughter-in-law Sudha is not in good terms, and so she wants Tamizharasu to marry a rich girl who is ready to be within the line drawn by her. She selects Charulatha (Srividya), the adopted daughter of a wealthy businessman, as the prospective bride. Tamizharasu is deeply saddened by Thulasi's refusal and so he accepts the engagement between Charu and him. However, through a string of events, Thulasi falls for Tamizh when he stops her marriage with Velayudham and joins her in an engineering college, paying the fees for her. Nevertheless, the marriage between Charu and Tamizh is arranged; Charu surrenders herself to Tamizh and sees him as her husband already, but Tamizh only loves Thulasi.

A sudden turn of events sees Tamizh marrying Thulasi at a temple without the consent of his family. The turn of events shatters Charu, and slowly she turns into a psychopath after directly witnessing the marriage between Tamizh and Thulasi. She develops a deadly vengeance towards Thulasi as she assumes that it was Thulasi who snatched Tamizharasu from her. Charu brainwashes Rukkumani into conspiring to separate Tamizharasu and Thulasi. Thulasi catches the plot and explains Charu's mentality to Tamizharasu, but Charu cleverly outwits Thulasi. Tamizh thinks that Thulasi has no trust in him and their relationship turns sour. Tamizh is ready to divorce her, but Thulasi begs Tamizh for a last chance to prove Charu's dirty thoughts and succeeds in exposing her true face and Thamizh starts hating Charu. In disappointment and vengeance, Charu tries to commit suicide, losing all her memory in the process and is incapable of attending even to her own needs. A furious Thamizh starts hating Rukkumani and leaves her house along with Thulasi.

Thulasi's biological mother, Bhuvana lives with her second husband, Lakshmanan, a doctor by profession and their son Prabhakar. Bhuvana had helped Lakshmanan become successful man and they own a hospital in which she is the chairman. Bhuvana is also a greedy and evil woman who only thinks money to be superior. Thulasi and Bhuvana's first meeting does not go well although they did not know the relationship between them. Soon after, Lakshmanan's first wife, Sundari (Yuvarani) who also happens to be Tamizh's former boss learns that Thulasi is Bhuvana's daughter. In a fierce fight between Thulasi and Bhuvana, the latter slaps her. Bhuvana plans to take revenge on Thulasi and breaks Thulasi's hand using her henchmen. Later, Thulasi and Bhuvana learn the real bond between them through Manikam, but Bhuvana despises Thulasi and says that she considers her not a daughter but a humiliation. Heartbroken, Thulasi decides to take revenge on Bhuvana by separating her from Lakshmanan and his wealth. At last, Bhuvana pretends to be having cancer so that her husband, son, Thulasi, and the others will pity her. She even goes to the extent of pretending to be a lovable mother to Thulasi. She separates Thulasi and her father, which results in Manikkam's suicide attempt after he misunderstands that Thulasi had betrayed him and had joined her mother.

Nevertheless, Thulasi, Thamizharasu and Sundari all find out that Bhuvana is lying. They resolve and successfully exposes the truth to Prabha and Lakshmanan. They chase Bhuvana away from their house, but Bhuvana plays a revenge game on Lakshmanan by setting up a fire in his hospital, and she cunningly makes him jailed for her crime. Lakshmanan and Sundari's 60th Marriage Ceremony is halted due to Lakshmanan's imprisonment. Lakshmanan asks Varadhan, his driver, to get his daughter Deepa (Thulasi's best friend) married to Prabhakar so that his honour will be saved. Deepa sacrifices her dreams and marries Prabhakar.

Kalyani (an auto driver and Thulasi's other close friend) and Mohan's love story too comes up. Mohan wants to marry Kalyani but Padma hates her due to being poor and financially unstable than them and having been provoked by Rukkumani. Nevertheless, Kalyani marries Mohan against Padma's wishes. Deepa divorces Prabhakar as he suspects her of being in love with Kanagu (he is Tamizh's friend and had a crush on Deepa). Finally, he repents his mistake and turns into a new leaf. Padma too realises her mistakes and apologizes wholeheartedly to Thulasi.

Charu, having survived her fall, has become crazy and believes that Thamizh is living with her. Rukkumani again tries to separate Tamizh and Thulasi by planting her past memories with Tamizh. Thulasi goes into prison for a crime she didn't commit because of Maya, Charu's real mother. Maya decides to separate Tamizh and Thulasi by drugging Tamizh and making him forget Thulasi. Thulasi, however, saves Tamizh at the correct time, and Charu and her mother die thereafter. Tamizh's mother still dislikes Thulasi but is forced to accept her as her daughter in law as she has no other choice.

The rest of the story involves around how Thulasi, alongside her now understanding husband Tamizharasu, overcome all the other trials and tribulations. The serial ends on a happy note with Thulasi becoming pregnant.

== Cast ==
=== Main cast ===
- Shruthi Raj as Thulasi Thamizharasu (Kuttymma), Tamil’s wife, Muthumanikkam and Bhuvana's daughter; Padma's stepdaughter; Mohan, Prabhakar and Pavithra's half-sister; Deepa and Kalyani's best friend.
- Deepak Dinkar as Thamizharasu a.k.a. Tamil (Kuttyppa), Thulasi's husband; Rukkumani's son; Lavanya and Puvi's brother.

=== Recurring cast ===
- Hemalatha as Deepa Prabhakar; Thulasi and Kalyani's bestfriend; Prabhakar's wife; Varatharajan and Indira's daughter
- Suzane George (1-878) / S. R. Kaviya Varshini Arun (879- 1340) as Kalyani Mohan; Mohan's wife; Thulasi and Deepa's best friend ; Sakunthala’s daughter; An auto driver.
- Adams as Prabhakar; Laxmanan and Bhuvana's son. Thulasi's half-brother. Deepa's husband.
- Ayyappan as Mohan Muthumanikkam; Kalyani's husband; Thulasi's stepbrother; Pavithra's brother
- Shanthi Williams (1-487)/ K. S. Jayalakshmi (488-1340) as Rukkumani; Thamizh, Puvi and Lavanya's mother who harbors hatred against Thulasi and considers her as an unlucky woman and tries to have her separated from Thamizh by any means of situation, but is forced to accept her following Charu's death (Antagonist)
- Subhalekha Sudhakar as Muthumanikkam; Thulasi, Mohan and Pavithra's father, Padma's husband and Bhuvana's former husband.
- Sadhana as Padma Muthumanikkam, Thulasi's stepmother. Mohan and Pavithra's mother. She hates Thulasi and had been the main cause of problems in the latter's life, but eventually realises her folly and reforms (Antagonist 1-1066/Protagonist 1070-1340)
- Aishwariyaa Bhaskaran (264-590) / Sudha Chandran (593-731;810) as Bhuvaneshwari "Bhuvana" Laxmanan. Thulasi and Prabhakar's mother. Laxmanan's second wife. Muthumanikkam's first and ex-wife. A money-minded woman who hates Thulasi and refuses to accept her as a biological daughter; Sundari's arch-rival. (Antagonist) (Jailed)
- Neelima Rani (7-617) / Shalu Kurian(618-1053) / Bhagyalakshmi (1054-1305) as Lavanya Nithish's wife, Tamizh and Puvi's younger sister.
- Shyam Sundar as Nithish, Lavanya's husband, Giriprakash's son, Charu's cousin.
- Srividya (75-554)/(1148-1241)as Charulatha Veera Raghavan, Nithish's cousin sister. Tamil’s obsessive and psychotic former fiance. She hates Thulasi and tries to separate Tamil and Thulasi. (Antagonist) Died. Accidentally killed by Maya.
- Aarthi (Devi Krupa) as Shyamala (Bujjimma)
- Shyam Viswanathan as Anand (Bujjippa), Tamil’s best friend. Shyamala’s husband.
- Sujatha Panju as Indira Varatharajan, Deepa’s mother.
- S. Rajasekar(1-995) as Varatharajan. Deepa’s father. A righteous man who supports his daughter’s decisions. (Died)
- Sujitha "Suji" (1-1105)/Sathya Sai Krishnan(1107-1340) as Pavithra Muthumanikkam, Thulasi’s younger step-sister.
- S. N. Lakshmi(1-578) as Thulasi's grandmother (passed away)
- Antony Raj as Puviarasu "Puvi", Tamil and Lavanya’s elder brother. Sudha’s husband. (7-1325)
- Lakshmi Vasudevan (7-74) / Bhavya Kala (75-900) as Sudha, Puvi's wife and Rukkumani's eldest daughter-in-law who is a clever woman and hates Rukkumani, Thulasi's sister figure who supports her and Tamil.
- Egavalli as Amirtha Varadharajan, Deepa's first younger sister
- Kiran Mai/ Akila Ramanamoorthy as Banu Varadharajan, Deepa's second younger sister
- V. Saranya (Swetha Venkat) as Revathy Saravana Kumar, Kalyani's first younger sister
- Preethi Menon Dayana (Preethi V.) as Malathy, Kalyani's second younger sister
- Yuvarani Ravindra as Thiripura Sundhari Laxmanan. Laxmanan's first wife. Bhuvana's arch-rival and Tamizh's former boss.
- Premi as Sakunthala, Kalyani, Revathy and Malathy's mother. (Died) (2-834)
- Ushapriya (K. Priya) as Thiripura Sundhari's mother
- A. C. Murali Mohan as Laxmanan, Sundhari and Bhuvana's husband. Akhil and Prabhakar's father. (296-731) (Dead)
- Giridhar Thirumalachary as Giriprakash, Nithish's father
- Viji Kannan as Nithish's mother
- Madhu Mohan as Veera Raghavan, Charu's adopted father
- Mohana Priya as Gayathri, Charu's adopted mother
- Veena Nair as Maya (1014-1241) (Antagonist) Charu's biological mother (dead)

=== Other cast ===
- Gopalakrishnan as Saravana Kumar, Revathy's husband
- Gayathri Yuvraaj (Y. Gayathri) as Nila (981-1331)
- Sabarish as Vicky, Nila's love interest
- A. Revathi as Nila's grandmother
- T. V. V. Ramanujam as Saravana Kumar's father
- Uma Mageshwari as Saravana Kumar's first elder sister
- Vaijayanthi as Saravana Kumar's second elder sister
- Unknown as Sekhar, Pavithra's ex fiancée (Antagonist)
- Unknown as Narmadha
- Raja as Kanagasabai "Kanagu"
- Sundar as Joseph
- Akhila as Roja Kanagasabai
- Hema as Hema
- Unknown (403)/Sweety (726-765)/Shamily Sukumar (766-874)as Suchi, Prabhakar's ex-girlfriend.(Antagonist)
- Iswarya Menon as Shruthi, Prabhakar's cousin. (Antagonist)
- Swaminathan as Venkatachalam
- K. R. Vatsala as Thilaga, Velayudham's elder sister
- Nizhalgal Ravi as Velayudham, Thilaga's brother (Antagonist)
- Kovai Anuradha as Anand's father
- Mumtaz Pakoda Kader as Anand's mother
- Vijay Anand as Gautham
- C. N. Ravi Shankar as Kalyani's fiancé
- Ilavarasan / Bhanuprakash as Vishwa
- Sabarna Anand as Ambika
- Shobana / Suhasini as Shyamala's sister
- N. Subramanian (Sakthivel) as Venkatraj
- Chithra as Shyamala's sister-in-law
- Thalapathy Dinesh as Shyamala's first elder brother
- Yuvraj as Lokeswaran, Shyamala's second elder brother
- Suruli Manohar as Sivagadacham
- Udumalai Ravi as Gothandam, Velayudham's assistant
- Baby Kavitha as Pooja
- V. Krishnan as Sudha's father
- Shereen Taha as Sakshi (Antagonist)
- V. Sri Latha as Seetha, Sakshi's mother (Antagonist)
- R. Raveendran "R. Ravi" (Jeeva Ravi) as Sakshi's father (Antagonist)
- Vishwam as the Central Minister
- N. Vinod as Sathyamoorthy "Sathya"
- Dhanasekaran (Mullai) as Namachivayam "Namachi"/Gowri's husband, Antagonist
- Nilani as Gowri, Antagonist
- Ashwanth Thilak as Avinash
- Sharmila Thapa as Tejeswari "Teju" (Kanaga)
- Robo Chandru as Azhagam Perumal
- Rajendranath (Meesai Rajendran) as Dharman
- Baboos as Sub Inspector
- Bagyanjali as Gomathy
- Jayanthi (Jenuya) as Bhavani
- Andrew Jesudoss as Venkatesh
- Rajkumar as Ganesha Pandian "GP"
- Annadurai Kannadasan as Commissioner
- Jhayasundari as Commissioner's wife
- Gokul as Commissioner's son
- Divya Prabha as Commissioner's daughter
- Moses as a food inspector
- Pushpalatha as Roja's mother
- Priya as Narmadha
- Lalitha as Sivaprakasam's mother
- Mithun Raj as Vetri
- Premalatha as a CBI officer
- Mohammed Afzal as a CBI officer
- Premrasan as a lawyer
- Krishna Kumar as Kanagu's brother
- Tamil Selvi as Kanangu's sister-in-law
- S. Gokulthilak as Gokul, Charulatha's suitor
- V. Vishwanath (Vishwa) as Charulatha's suitor
- S. Ramakrishnan as Mariyappan
- Venkatakrishnan as Sekar's father
- Eswari as Sekar's mother
- R. Selvanathan as Sridharan
- Moses as Parandhaman
- Vaani as Nithish's grandaunt
- K. Anjalatchi as Logu
- Gemini as Counselor
- M. Ravi as a police assistant commissioner
- Jagadeesan as a police inspector
- Manikandaraj Major as a police assistant commissioner
- David Solomon Raja as a police commissioner
- C. Rajaappasamy as Murugesan
- S. Palaniappan as Dharman's assistant
- Jayanthi Shankar as Porkodi
- Y. P. Gajjendran as Lakshmikanth
- Jayashree Nair as Nila's mother
- Babu Bilal "Bobby" as Shyam
- Haaris as Keshav Prasad "Keshav"
- M. Rani as Saravana Kumar's aunt
- Ashwin as Sivaprakasam "Siva"
- Rudran Praveen as Srinivasan "Seenu"
- Aravish as Aadhikesavan "Aadhi"
- G. V. E. Krishna "Krish" as Guruprasad "Guru"
- Vasantha as a jail warden
- R. Sundira Vali as a prisoner

== Production ==
=== Casting ===
Shruthi Raj was approached for the female lead, initially she refused, but Shruthi Raj reconsidered her decision after realizing that this series will be produced by a well reputed company like Vikatan Televistas as a replacement for the time slot of their highly successful series Kolangal. Moreover, she was also interested with the story narrated by S. Kumaran. Shruthi Raj made her acting debut in television with this series. Television actor and anchor Deepak Dinkar, who is very well known for playing supporting roles and negative roles in many serials, was signed to play the male lead Thamizharasan, marking his 2nd collaboration with both the director and company after the successfully running series Thirumathi Selvam in which he was already playing a supporting role with grey shades.

== Reception ==
The Indian newspaper Business Standard describes it as the "first youthful prime time daily soap in Tamil". Thendral has been highly acclaimed and has won many awards. Thendral was amongst the first Tamil Serials to go viral on the internet.

== Awards ==
Year	Award	Category	Recipient	Role	Result
2010	Tamil Nadu State Television Awards	Best Television Serial (Second Prize)	Thendral		Won
2010	Tamil Nadu State Television Awards	Best Actor	Deepak Dinkar	Thamizharasu	Won
2010	Tamil Nadu State Television Awards	Best Actress	Shruthi Raj	Thulasi	Won
2010	Tamil Nadu State Television Awards	Best Villain Male	Nizhalgal Ravi	Velayudham	Won
2010	Tamil Nadu State Television Awards	Best Achiever	Subhalekha Sudhakar	Muthu Manikkam	Won
2010	Tamil Nadu State Television Awards	Best Editing	B. Chandru		Won
2010	Vikatan Awards	Best Mega Serial	Thendral		Won
2011	Tamil Nadu State Television Awards	Best Villain Female	Srividya	Charulatha	Won
2011	Tamil Nadu State Television Awards	Best Dialogue writer	Ezhilvaradhan		Won
2011	Mylapore Academy Awards	Best Production House	Vikatan Televistas		Won
2011	Mylapore Academy Awards	Best Actor	Deepak Dinkar	Thamizharasu	Won
2011	Mylapore Academy Awards	Best Actress	Shruthi Raj	Thulasi	Won
2011	Mylapore Academy Awards	Best Character Actor	Subhalekha Sudhakar	Muthumanikkam	Won
2011	Mylapore Academy Awards	Best Actor in a Negative Role	Nizhalgal Ravi	Velayudham	Won
2011	Mylapore Academy Awards	Best Actress in a Negative Role	Shanti Williams	Thamizharasu, Puviarasu and Lavanya's mother	Won
2011	Mylapore Academy Awards	Best Music Director	Kiran		Won
2012	Tamil Nadu State Television Awards	Best Villain Female	Sadhana	Padma	Won
2012	Sun Kudumbam Viruthugal	Sun Kudumbam Best Jodi Award	Deepak Dinkar & Shruthi Raj	Thamizharasu & Thulasi	Won
2012	Sun Kudumbam Viruthugal	Sun Kudumbam Best Director Award	S. Kumaran		Won
2012	Sun Kudumbam Viruthugal	Sun Kudumbam Best Serial Award	Thendral		Nominated
2012	Sun Kudumbam Viruthugal	Sun Kudumbam Best Actor Award	Deepak Dinkar	Thamizharasu	Nominated
2012	Sun Kudumbam Viruthugal	Sun Kudumbam Best Actress Award	Shruthi Raj	Thulasi	Nominated
2012	Sun Kudumbam Viruthugal	Sun Kudumbam Best Son in Law	Deepak Dinkar	Thamizharasu	Nominated
2012	Sun Kudumbam Viruthugal	Sun Kudumbam Best Comedian Award Male	Shyam	Anand	Nominated
2012	Sun Kudumbam Viruthugal	Sun Kudumbam Best Supporting Actress Award	Hemalatha	Deepa	Nominated
2012	Sun Kudumbam Viruthugal	Sun Kudumbam Best Screenwriter Award	C. U. Muthuselvan		Nominated
2014	Mylapore Academy Awards	Best Serial	Thendral		Won
2014	Sun Kudumbam Viruthugal	Sun Kudumbam Best Actor Award	Deepak Dinkar	Thamizharasu	Won
2014	Sun Kudumbam Viruthugal	Sun Kudumbam Devathaigal Award	Shruthi Raj	Thulasi	Won
2014	Sun Kudumbam Viruthugal	Sun Kudumbam Best Jodi Award	Deepak Dinkar & Shruthi Raj	Thamizharasu & Thulasi	Won
2014	Sun Kudumbam Viruthugal	Sun Kudumbam Best Dialogue Writer Award	Ezhilvaradhan		Won
2014	Sun Kudumbam Viruthugal	Sun Kudumbam Best Actress Award	Shruthi Raj	Thulasi	Nominated
2014	Sun Kudumbam Viruthugal	Sun Kudumbam Best Supporting Actress Award	Hemalatha	Deepa	Nominated

== Crossover ==
Thendral had a crossover with Thirumathi Selvam as a special episode on 1 May 2011.

== See also ==
- List of programs broadcast by Sun TV (India)
