= Thirumathi Selvam =

2007 Tamil drama

- Genre: Soap opera
- Written by: V. K. Amirtharaj
- Screenplay by: V. K. Amirtharaj; S. L. Amalraj
- Story by: S. Kumaran
- Directed by: S. Kumaran
- Creative directors: M.V. Kumar; B. Radha
- Starring: Abitha; Sanjeev; Rindhya
- Theme music composer: D. Imman (Title Song); Kiran (Background Score)
- Opening theme: "Sooriyanae Chandhiranae"; Shweta Mohan (Vocal); Yugabharathi (Lyrics)
- Country of origin: India
- Original language: Tamil
- No. of seasons: 1
- No. of episodes: 1,360

Production
- Executive producers: A. Sundaram; K. Prabhuu
- Producers: Radhika Srinivasan; B. Srinivasan
- Production location: Chennai
- Cinematography: S. T. Martz
- Editors: Sasi K. Basant; G. V. Rajan; B. Chandru; S. Nielstein
- Running time: approx. 16 minutes
- Production company: Vikatan Televistas

Original release
- Network: Sun TV (2007-2013) re-telecast Kalaignar TV (2021-2023)
- Release: 5 November 2007 – 22 March 2013

Related
- Pavitra Rishta

Thirumathi Selvam (transl. Mrs. Selvam) is a 2007 Tamil television soap opera directed by S. Kumaran and produced by Radhika Srinivasan & B. Srinivasan for Vikatan Televistas. It stars Abitha and Sanjeev in the lead roles with Rindhya, Gautami and Vadivukkarasi played supporting roles. It premiered on 5 November 2007 and initially aired weekday afternoons on Sun TV, before being moved to 8PM on 1 December 2008. The serial ended on 22 March 2013 with 1360 episodes. Thirumathi Selvam is currently re-airing on Kalaignar TV from 29 March 2021.

The story revolves around the lead character Selvam and showed how his good qualities, hard work, and love for his wife Archana and care for his best friend Nandhini and how that made him reach great heights. Then, it shows how money, fame, and power lead to his downfall.

The serial was remade in Hindi as Pavitra Rishta under Balaji Telefilms, which aired on Zee TV, in Telugu as Devatha, Kannada as Jokali and in Malayalam as Nilavilakku which aired from 2009 to 2013 on Surya TV.

== Plot ==
The story revolves around Selvam, an uneducated mechanic and Archana, and how their lives intertwine after an arranged marriage. Selvam hails from a lower-middle class family. His family consists of his father Poongavanam, his step-mother Bhagyam, younger half-siblings Vasu and Rani. Poongavanam is a useless man who spends his days drinking and Selvam is the sole-breadwinner. Bhagayam genuinely loves Selvam and they all live united. Periyavar is Poongavanam's older brother who lives in another house and is well-respected by the family. Nandini is a rich girl who is Selvam's childhood friend who secretly likes him but Selvam does not harbour any feelings for her. Meanwhile, Archana hails from a well-to-do middle class family. Her parents Sivaraman and Sivagami care about Archana, who had stopped her studies so that her younger siblings can study well. Her older brother Vinoth is married to Jayanthi, a cunning woman, and they have a daughter. Archana's younger sisters are Kaviya and Priya. Jayanthi wants her older brother, Dina to marry Archana by faking his credentials but he is found to be a drug smuggler and they marriage is halted, which causes friction for Jayanthi between Sivagami and Vinoth. Even, Jayanthi's mother Sinthamani hates Archana. To take revenge, Jayanthi and Sinthamani meet Selvam's family and try to reason with them to fake his studies and employment as a graduate and engineer to get Archana married. Selvam had seen Archana before and falls for her and thus, Periyavar too accepts to cheat the family for better. It is only after marriage Archana learns the truth. She stays with her mother but goes back to Selvam's house after Periyavar apologises and all. Sivagami hates Selvam and ill-treats him on many occasions. Archana slowly starts to settle and the two unite. Vasu runs away with Revathy who is the daughter of a high-profile man. Soon, Bhagyam is brainwashed by Sinthamani and she starts hating Selvam. Things take turn, and Selvam and Archana leave the house. Nandini and Selvam's friend help them and they start a car re-sale business which blooms and Selvam becomes wealthy. Everyone accepts all but Selvam's attitude starts changing. He starts suspecting Archana. All this is caused by Nandini, who feels insulted after Sivagami slaps her publicly for interfering in Selvam and Archana's lives. Many things occurs and Archana leaves Selvam and unites with a do-gooder Karunaikumar. Archana's parents and Bhagyam dies and Nandini dies too after Selvam kills her for cheating him and learning of all truths. Selvam gets arrested and loses his fortunes. He then returns to Archana a year later after his release and is alone. Archana rejects and berates him and even his father and siblings side with Archana. Selvam is left alone and even Siva and his wife don't care about him. Selvam sits under the same tree where he only had his tools to repair cars after he is kicked out of his house by Bhagyam, and this time around, Archana is not with him and he has nothing in his life.

== Cast ==
=== Main ===
- Abitha as Archana Selvam – Selvam's wife – female lead. A loving and caring wife.
- Sanjeev Venkat as Selvam, Archana's husband and Nandhini's best friend – male lead, a mechanic, He loved his wife Archana. But soon he completely changed into ruthless, and he lost all his wealth and family.

=== Recurring ===
- Rindhya (2007–2009; 2012–2013) as Nandhini
  - a businesswoman, Selvam's best friend, Initially, one-sidedly loves him but changes after he married Archana. She and her father helped Selvam and Archana for their growth (episodes 1–1116)
  - But she later turns into an antagonist, because of Archana's mother, Vasu and Bhagyam (episodes 1117–1355) (died in the serial)
    - Latha Rao (2010–2011) as (Temporarily Replaced Rindhya's role as Nandhini)
- K. R. Vatsala (2007–2008); Goutami (2008–2013) as Bhagyam Poongavanam, Selvam's stepmother, Vasu and Rani's mother. She sends Selvam to work for their family at a very young age disrupting his studies. Usurps Selvam’s properties and oust him and his wife from their home. She also turns Nandini against Archana which led to Nandini separating Archana and Selvam (main antagonist) (died in serial).
- Vadivukkarasi as Sivagami, Archana, Vinod, Kavya and Priya’s mother. Selvam, Jayanthi and Cherry’s mother-in-law. (Died. Killed in bomb blast by Nandhini). A mother who loves and cares for Archana among all of her four children. Her motherly love towards Archana blinds her conscience which turns Archana’s life upside down.
- Vizhuthugal Santhanam as Sivaramakrishnan a.k.a. Sivaraman, Archana, Vinod, Kavya and Priya’s father (died in the serial). Sivagami’s husband.
- V C Jeyamani as Poongavanam; Selvam's foster father and Vasu and Rani's father
- Ceylon Manohar as Rangarajan, Nandhini's father, Selvam's well-wisher (died)
- Tinku (2007–2012); Dev Anand Sharma (2012–2013) as Vasu – Selvam's foster younger brother, Revathy's husband. Evil, carefree and money-minded. Plots to spoil Selvam’s life. Later, turns into a good person and helps Archana.
- Deepak Dinkar as Cherry, Kavya's husband (Antagonist) (Jailed)
- Ragavi as Jayanthi, Archana's sister-in-law who provokes Bhagyam along with Chinthamani against Archana and Selvam, and leaves away India along with Vinoth after being hoodwinked by Dinakaran (main antagonist). Always plots to spoil her mother-in-law, Sivagami’s happiness.
- Supergood Kannan as Karunai Kumar, Archana's well-wisher, owner of Karunai Illam orphanage.
- Peeli Sivam as Narayanan (Periyavar), Poongavanam's elder brother, Selvam's paternal uncle (died)
- Birla Bose as Vinothkumar "Vinoth" Sivaraman, Archana's brother
- Kavitha (2007–2010); Shivani (2010–2013) as Kavya Sorimuthu Aiyanaar; Cherry's wife, Archana's sister
- Nikitha Murali as Baby meenakshi
- Archana (2007–2010); Kavya Varshini Arun (2010–2012) as Priya Dina, Archana's younger sister, Dina's ex-love interest (Died. Killed by Cherry)
- Aparna as Rani, Selvam's foster younger sister
- Sakthi Saravanan as Akash, Rani’s husband.
- Soori as Amirtham, Selvam's assistant
- Swapna Sharath as Revathy Vasudevan, Vasu's wife, Rajashekar's daughter. A righteous woman who morally supports Archana and Selvam even risking her marital life with Vasu.
- Vijay Anand as Dinakaran "Dheena", Chinthamani's son, Jayanthi's elder brother (antagonist)
- Priya as Chinthamani, Jayanthi and Dina's mother who works along with Jayanthi and Bhagyam to create problems for Archana and Selvam, and is later cheated by her son, Dinakaran (antagonist)
- Satish (2008–2011); Arvind Khatare (2011–2013) as Chezhiyan "Chezhiyan", Nandhini's ex-husband
- Shravan as Dileepan, Kavya's ex-love interest
- Ramachandran Mahalingam as Ambattur Rajashekar, Revathy's father, a gangster who holds kangaroo courts. Initially, a gangster who disapproves of Vasu and Revathy’s marriage. Later accepts them and plots against Selvam. He later turns into a new leaf realising his mistake.
- Akila as Bhanumathi Shekhar, Archana and Selvam's old neighbor and well-wisher, Shekar's wife.
- Apsara as Kavitha, Jayanthi's colleague
- Golden Suresh as Madhan Lal Seth
- Sheela as Parvathi, Kumar's mother
- Lenin as Raj Kumar, Kumar's father
- Venkat as Ranjith Kumar
- Sreedhar as Chandrashekar "Shekar", Bhanu's husband, Archana and Selvam's old neighbor
- Baby Harini as Ramya, Jayanthi and Vinodh's daughter
- Laxmi Rattan as Sushil Kumar, Selvam's business partner
- CN.Ravi Shankar as Muthu kumar
- T.Rajeswari as Dileepan's mother
- Sri Latha as Akash and Saroja's mother
- Ganesh Babu as Saroja's husband and Akash's brother-in-law

== Awards and honours ==
Thirumathi Selvam awards and nominations
Awards and nominations
Award	Wins	Nominations
Mylapore Academy Award	1	1
Sun Kudumbam Awards	15	22
Tamil Nadu State Television Awards	10	10

Totals (Note: Certain award groups do not simply award one winner. They acknowledge several different recipients, have runners-up, and have third place. Since this is a specific recognition and is different from losing an award, runner-up mentions are considered wins in this award tally. For simplification and to avoid errors, each award in this list has been presumed to have had a prior nomination.)
- Wins: 31
- Nominations: 38

Year	Award	Category	Recipient	Role	Result
2007	Mylapore Academy Award	Best Actress Award	Abitha	Archana	Won
2008	Vivel Chinnathirai Award	Best Actress Award (2nd Runner up)	Abitha	Archana	Won
2008	Vivel Chinnathirai Award	Best Actor Award	Sanjeev	Selvam	Won
2008	Vivel Chinnathirai Award	Best Director Award	S. Kumaran		Won
2008	Vivel Chinnathirai Award	Best Story Director Award	S. Kumaran		Won
2010	Sun Kudumbam Awards 2010	Best Actor	Sanjeev	Selvam	Won
2010	Sun Kudumbam Awards 2010	Best Actress	Abitha	Archana	Won
2010	Sun Kudumbam Awards 2010	Best Director	S. Kumaran		Won
2010	Sun Kudumbam Awards 2010	Best Serial	Thirumathi Selvam		Won
2010	Sun Kudumbam Awards 2010	Best Dialogue Writer	V.K Amirtharaj		Won
2010	Sun Kudumbam Awards 2010	Best Mother	Vadivukkarasi	Sivagami	Won
2010	Sun Kudumbam Awards 2010	Best Mamanar	Vizhuthugal Santhanam	Sivaraman	Won
2010	Sun Kudumbam Awards 2010	Best Mamiyar	Gowthami	Bagyam	Won
2010	Sun Kudumbam Awards 2010	Best Sister	Aparna	Rani	Won
2010	Sun Kudumbam Awards 2010	Best Negative Role Female	Ragavi	Jeyanthi	Nominated
2010	Sun Kudumbam Awards 2010	Best Father	Jeyamani	Poongavanam	Won
2012	Sun Kudumbam Awards 2010	Best Actress	Abitha	Archana	Won
2012	Sun Kudumbam Awards 2010	Best Mother	Gauthami	Bagyam	Nominated
2012	Sun Kudumbam Awards 2010	Best Mamiyar	Vadivukkarasi	Sivagami	Won
2012	Sun Kudumbam Awards 2010	Best Serial	Thirumathi Selvam		Won
2012	Sun Kudumbam Awards 2010	Best Jodi	Sanjeev & Abitha	Selvam & Archana	Nominated
2012	Sun Kudumbam Awards 2010	Best Mamanar	V.C Jeyamani	Poongavanam	Nominated
2012	Sun Kudumbam Awards 2010	Best Director	S. Kumaran		Won
2012	Sun Kudumbam Awards 2010	Best Screenwriter	Ve. Ki. Amirtharaj		Won
2012	Sun Kudumbam Awards 2010	Best Dialogue Writer	Amirtharaj		Nominated
2012	Sun Kudumbam Awards 2010	Best Cinematographer	S.T Martz		Nominated
2012	Sun Kudumbam Awards 2010	Best Editor	Nilstin		Nominated
2009	Tamil Nadu State Television Awards – 2009	Best Series (1st)	Thirumathi Selvam		Won
2009	Tamil Nadu State Television Awards – 2009	Best Actor Male	Sanjeev	Selvam	Won
2009	Tamil Nadu State Television Awards – 2009	Best Character role Female	Vadivukkarasi	Sivagami	Won
2009	Tamil Nadu State Television Awards – 2009	Best Negative Role Female	Gowthami	Bagyam	Won
2009	Tamil Nadu State Television Awards – 2009	Best Child Actress	Harini	Ramya	Won
2009	Tamil Nadu State Television Awards – 2009	Best Character Role Male	V.C Jeyamani	Poongavanam	Won
2009	Tamil Nadu State Television Awards – 2009	Best Director Award	S. Kumaran		Won
2009	Tamil Nadu State Television Awards – 2009	Best Cinematographer Award	S.T Martz		Won
2009	Tamil Nadu State Television Awards – 2009	Best Character Role Male	Vizhuthugal Santhanam	Sivaraman	Won
2009	Tamil Nadu State Television Awards – 2009	Best Negative Role Male	R. Ramachandran	Rajasekar	Won
2009	Tamil Nadu State Television Awards – 2009	Best Background voice for Male	Karthik		Won

== Crossover ==
Thirumathi Selvam had a crossover with Thendral as a special episode on 1 May 2011.
