= List of programs broadcast by Puthuyugam TV =

Original programming currently and formerly broadcast by Puthuyugam TV:

== Currently broadcast ==
- Alayangal Adpudhangal
- Neram Nalla neram
- Rasipalanl
- Rusikalam Vanga

== Formerly broadcast ==
=== Comedy series ===
- Arasiyalla Ithellam Saatharanamappaa (அரசியல்ல இதெல்லாம் சாதாரணமப்பா)
- Krishna Lattu thinna Asaiya (கிருஷ்ணா லட்டு தின்ன ஆசையா)

=== Mythology series ===
- Nayanmargal (நாயன்மார்கள்)

=== Soap operas ===
- Agni Paravai (அக்னி பறவை)
- Arangetram (அரங்கேற்றம்)
- Kadamai Kanniyam Kattupaadu (கடமை கண்ணியம் கட்டுப்பாடு)
- Kayitham (காயிதம்)
- Malli (மல்லி)
- Sare Gama Gama Gama (சரி கம கம கம)
- Unarvugal (உணர்வுகள்)

=== Korean dramas ===
- K-Series
  - The 1st Shop of Coffee Prince
  - Boys Over Flowers
  - The Greatest Love
  - The Heirs
  - Iris
  - Master's Sun
  - Moon Embracing the Sun
  - My Love from the Star
  - Pasta
  - Playful Kiss
  - Secret Garden
  - To the Beautiful You
  - You're Beautiful

=== Dubbed soap operas ===
- Anamika
- Asoakavanam
- Azhagiya Tamil Magal
- Indru Poi Naalai Vaa?
- Kalloori Paravaikal
- Pattu Selai
- Reporters
- Sippikul Muthu
- Snegithiyae
- Sri Krishna Avatharam
- Sri Saneeswara Mahimai
- Thik Thik Thikil
- Vikramathithan Simmasanam
- Vizhiye Kathai Eluthu

=== Reality/non-scripted shows ===
- 6 Doctorgal 1008 Kelvigal
- 6 Suvai 100 Vagai
- Arindhathum Ariyathathum
- Azhake Ayiram
- Bicycle Dairy
- Celebrity Kitchen
- Doctor On Call
- Dosth Bada Dosth
- Guru Sishyan
- Hello Doctor
- Ippadi Panreengale Ma
- K2K.com Rasikka Rusikka
- Kadhalil Sodhapathathu Eppadi
- Kalvi 360
- Karuppu Vellai
- Kelvi Paathi Kindal Paathi
- Madhan Movie Matinee
- Manam Thirumbuthe
- Manithanum Marmangalum
- Melam Kottu Thali Kattu (Season: 1&2)
- Natchathira Jannal (Season: 1&2)
- Odi Vilayadu Mummy
- Oru Nimidam Please
- Padatha Patellam
- Red Carpet
- Rishimoolam
- Star Junction
- Stars Day Out
- Thiramai Pongum Thamizhagam
- Town Galatta
- Ungal Kitchen Engal Chef
- Uravai Thedi
- Veedu Thandi Varuvaya
- Vina Vidai Vettai
- Vina Vidai Vettai Juniors
- Vina Vidai Vettai Juniors (season 2)
- Yaavarum Kelir
- Yuppies Ku Mattum Alla

== List of movies ==
- Madurai Mappillai (2007)
- Kozhi Koovuthu (2012)
- Karutha Kannan C/O Rekla Race (2012)
- Pannaiyarum Padminiyum (2013)
- Summa Nachunu Irukku (2013)
- Mathapoo (2013)
- Sutta Kadhai (2013)
- Ego (2013)
- Inji Murappa (2015)
