= Anwesha Das =

Indian Bharatnatyam dancer

- Das performing at Kartik Fine Arts, Chennai (December 2024)
- Born: 1986 (age 39–40)
- Education: University of Rochester
- Occupations: Bharatanatyam dancer, teacher, artistic director
- Known for: Bharatanatyam (Vazhuvoor bani)
- Website: natyashakti.godaddysites.com

Anwesha Das is an Indian Bharatanatyam dancer, teacher, and artistic director based in Seattle, Washington. A senior disciple of Guru Urmila Satyanarayana, she is trained in the Vazhuvoor bani (style) of Bharatanatyam. She is the founder and artistic director of Natya Shakti, a Bharatanatyam school in Bothell, Washington, and serves on the board of the Chamber of Indian Performing Arts (CIPA), a non-profit organisation supporting Indian classical performing artists in the Pacific Northwest region of the United States.

Das has performed at major venues including the Music Academy in Chennai, the Khajuraho Dance Festival, the Nita Mukesh Ambani Cultural Centre (NMACC) in Mumbai, and the Cleveland Thyagaraja Festival in the United States. She is an empaneled artist with the Indian Council for Cultural Relations (ICCR) and a graded artist of Doordarshan, India's national television.

== Early life and training ==
Das was born in Odisha, India, and grew up in Chennai, Tamil Nadu, where her family lived near the dance school of Guru Urmila Satyanarayana. She began learning Bharatanatyam at the age of nine in 1995, enrolling at Natya Sankalpaa, the academy founded by Sathyanarayanan. Her training also included Carnatic music and yoga as part of the curriculum.

She is described as the senior-most disciple of Sathyanarayanan and is trained in the Vazhuvoor tradition (bani) of Bharatanatyam, which emphasises dramatic lasya-style movements, faster footwork, and expressive storytelling.

Das had her arangetram (solo debut) in March 2000.

Das pursued higher education in the United States, earning a Master's in Marketing and an MBA from the University of Rochester in New York. She moved to the U.S. in 2007 and initially worked as a Business Analyst before dedicating herself to dance full-time after settling in Seattle in 2010.

== Career ==
=== Performing Career ===
Following her arangetram in 2000, Das established a performing career spanning India and the United States. She travels annually between the two countries, performing in the U.S. during the summer and spring, and in India during the fall and winter, particularly during the Margazhi festival in Chennai.

In India, Das has performed at the Music Academy in Chennai, Narada Gana Sabha, Brahma Gana Sabha, Sri Krishna Gana Sabha, Kartik Fine Arts, the Khajuraho Dance Festival, the Natyanjali Festival at Chidambaram, the Nita Mukesh Ambani Cultural Centre (NMACC) in Mumbai, and the India Habitat Centre in New Delhi.

In the United States, she has performed at the Cleveland Thyagaraja Festival (where she was adjudged Best Dancer in the senior category in 2009), SPICMACAY at Carnegie Mellon University in Pittsburgh, the St. Louis Indian Dance Festival, and the Northwest Folklife Festival in Seattle.

In 2017, Das portrayed the character Surupa in Chitrangada, a dance-drama by Rabindranath Tagore produced by Pratidhwani at ACT Theatre in Seattle. The production, which featured eleven classical and contemporary Indian dance forms, was covered by The Economic Times.

=== Cultural Diplomacy ===
Das is an empaneled artist with the Indian Council for Cultural Relations (ICCR), having been empaneled in 2005 in the "Proficient" category. Through this association, she has represented India in international cultural diplomacy initiatives.

In 2016, the ICCR presented her solo concert in Bhubaneswar, Odisha, marking her first performance in her home state.

In 2018, she represented the Ministry of Culture, India at the Festival of India in Colombia, South America, where she conducted workshops and presented recitals.

In January 2026, Das performed a Bharatanatyam recital commemorating 150 years of Vande Mataram at the Washington State Capitol in Olympia, as part of India's 77th Republic Day celebrations organised by the Consulate General of India, Seattle. The Washington State Senate passed Resolution No. 8674 honouring the occasion.

In August 2023, Das performed at India's 77th Independence Day celebrations in Glasgow, Scotland, at an event organised by the Consulate General of India, Edinburgh and sponsored by ICCR. The event was attended by Scottish politicians including Anas Sarwar and Jackie Baillie.

=== Teaching ===
Das is the founder and artistic director of Natya Shakti, a Bharatanatyam school in Bothell, Washington, where she offers intensive training rooted in the traditional lexicon of the dance form.

She was twice selected as a Master artist in the Washington State Heritage Arts Apprenticeship Program, first in 2019–2020 (with apprentice Akhilesh Vadari) and again in 2022–2023 (with apprentice Nidhi Achanta).

During the COVID-19 pandemic, Das organised two online editions of the Seattle Youth Dance Festival to provide a platform for young dancers.

== Recognition ==
Das has received several awards and titles from Indian cultural organisations, including:

- Nadanamamani — Kartik Fine Arts, Chennai (2014)
- Yuva Kala Bharati — Bharat Kalachar, Chennai (2006)
- Natya Chudar — Kartik Fine Arts
- Best Dancer — Cleveland Thyagaraja Festival, USA (2009)
- Nritya Shiromani — Utkala Yuva Sanskrutik Sangh, Cuttack
- Natya Saradhi — Natraj Music and Dance Academy, Visakhapatnam
- Nritya Damini — Shri Ariyakudi Music Foundation

Her work has been reviewed by leading Indian dance critics including the late Shri Subbudu and Leela Venkataraman, as well as by reviewers for The Hindu, The New Indian Express, and Narthaki magazine.

Dance historian and critic Dr. Sunil Kothari described her as "the find of the festival" at the 2013 Khajuraho Dance Festival.

== Critical reception ==
Das's performances have been regularly reviewed in The Hindu since 2004, with critics tracking her evolution as an artist.

The Hindu reviewer Vidya Saranyan wrote in 2011 that Das possessed "a vibrant stage presence, angasudha and competency in abhinaya... her dance came packaged with the traits of a perfect technique."

Rupa Srikanth, reviewing for The Hindu in 2016, noted that Das " She is light on her feet, steady in her poses and meticulous in her execution; she is, in addition, a fluent communicator."

The Hindu reviewer V.V. Ramani wrote in 2025 that Das "explored the ideas convincingly" in her Shiva-themed margam, noting her "fine expressions of jealousy and anger" in the javali and the "powerfully visualised" depiction of key episodes from the Ramayana.

In 2025, industrialist and arts patron Nalli Kuppuswami Chetti remarked after her performance at the Margazhi festival: "All her adavus and bhavas were on point. She did not miss a single beat. I have been watching her perform for 20 years now and she has improved very well in communicating the narratives."

== Personal life ==
Das is the daughter of Shaktikanta Das, a former IAS officer who served as the 25th Governor of the Reserve Bank of India (RBI) from 2018 to 2024. She is fluent in Odia, Tamil, Hindi, and English.

== See also ==
- Bharatanatyam
- Urmila Satyanarayana
- Vazhuvoor Bani
- Madras Music Season
- Indian Council for Cultural Relations
