= Arangetram =

Arangetram may refer to:

- Arangetram (dance), the debut performance in Indian classical dance and music
- Arangetram (1973 film), a 1973 Indian Tamil-language film
- Arangetram (TV series), a 2014 Indian-Tamil-language soap opera
- Arangetram (2023 film), a 2023 Indian Telugu-language film
