= Anjana Rangan =

Indian video jockey/anchor

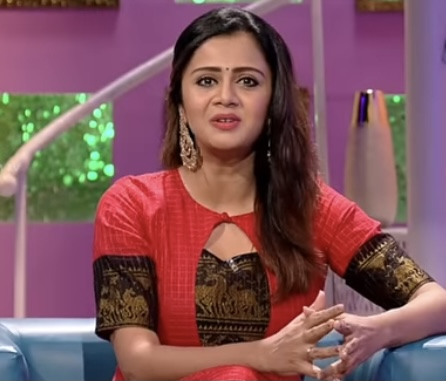
- Anjana during a television show
- Born: 25 August 1989 (age 37); Chennai, Tamil Nadu, India
- Other name: Anjana Chandran
- Education: M.O.P. Vaishnav College for Women
- Occupations: Television presenter; video jockey
- Years active: 2008–present
- Spouse: Chandran (m. 2016)
- Children: 1

Anjana Rangan (born 25 August 1989) is an Indian television presenter and video jockey. She is known as an anchor in the Tamil channel Sun Music. She is also credited as one of the Most Desirable Women, according to the Times of India.

She made her first acting on screen in the 2008 television personality competition Miss Chinnathirai 2008 where she emerged as the winner of the competition. She later started her career as a Television presenter and hosted successful shows such as Paattu.Com (2010), Paattu Pudusu (2011), Namma Star (2012), Natchathira Jannal (2013–2017), Box Office (2013), Konjam Uppu Konjam Karam (2014), Dance Jodi Dance 3.0 (2014), Neengalum Naangalum (2015), Cafe Tea Area (2016), Junior Super Stars (2017), Sunday Kondattam (2017), Freeya Vidu (2017) and Vazhthukkal (2018).

== Career ==
Anjana Rangan was born on 25 August 1989 in Chennai. Before becoming a video jockey, she was a television host. Anjana also won Miss Chinnathirai 2008 before becoming an anchor or a video jockey. Anjana also anchored in television shows such as Neengalum Naangalum, Namma Star, Konjam Uppu Konjam Karam and Paattu Pudusu.

In early-2018, Anjana decided to go on a break after 10 years in the entertainment industry and Sun TV to prioritize family commitments.

After her break Anjana returned to anchoring in 2019, she anchored in shows like Junior Super Stars, Natchathira Jannal on Puthuyugam TV and Sunday Kondattam on Sun TV. She was also ranked 15 in Chennai Times 20 Most Desirable Women on TV 2019. She was also yet again listed in 2020 ranking her 11th.

Anjana faced cyber bullying and harassment over social media, she received vulgar and inappropriate messages on Twitter and Instagram from audiences and followers, eventually Anjana and her husband reported the issue to cyber crime security and Tamil Nadu Police.

During the launch event of the film Pushpa: The Rise which was hosted by Anjana, fans criticized Anjana saying that the main actor of the film Allu Arjun walked away from the stage due to how Anjana treated him. However Anjana later clarified that all those rumors were false on social media.

== Personal life ==
Anjana married actor Chandran on March 10, 2016. In 2018, the couple had a son.

== Filmography ==
=== Selected Television ===
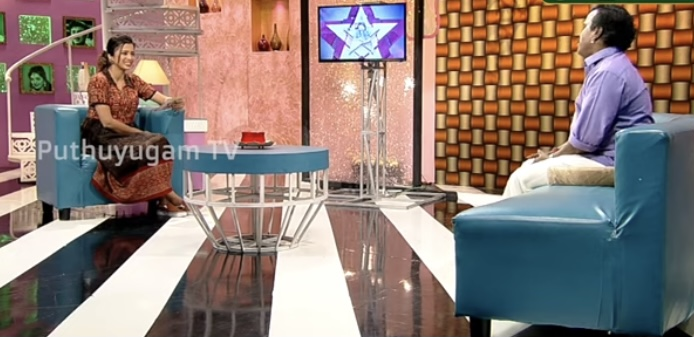
Anchor Anjana (Facing Front) with playback singer Anthony Daasan on show Natchathira Jannal.

- Miss Chinnathirai 2008 – Contestant (winner)
- Paattu.Com – Host
- Paattu Pudusu – Host
- Namma Star – Host
- Konjam Uppu Konjam Karam – Host
- Dance Jodi Dance 3.0 – Host
- Box Office – Host
- Neengalum Naangalum – Host
- Natchathira Jannal – Host
- Cafe Tea Area – Host
- Junior Super Stars – Host
- Sunday Kondattam – Host
- Freeya Vidu – Host
- Vazhthukkal – Host

== Health ==
Anjana Rangan was tested positive to COVID-19 on 19 January 2022, However she later recovered from the virus.
