= Madhan (writer) =

Tamil cartoonist and writer

- Born: Maadapoosi Krishnaswamy Govindan; 11 July 1947 (age 79); Srirangam, Tiruchirappalli, Tamil Nadu, India
- Occupations: Cartoonist, writer

Madhan, real name Maadapoosi Krishnaswamy Govindan (born 11 July 1947 in Srirangam), is a Tamil cartoonist, journalist, writer and film critic.

== Career ==
He previously worked for the weekly magazine Ananda Vikatan and now hosts a film-review show Madhan Movie Matinee on Puthuyugam TV.

He was one of the juries for the television program Naalaya Iyakunar, Season 1.

In 2016, he was the presenter of the Tamil supernatural investigation television series Manithanum Marmangalum.

== Personal life ==
Madhan resides in Chennai, Tamil Nadu.

== Works ==
The works are not listed in chronological order.

- Manithanum Marmangalum
- Vanthargal Vendrargal
- Manithanukulle Oru Mirugam
- KiMu KiPi
- Hai Madhan
- Kadhal Vazhga

== See also ==
- List of cartoonists
- List of Indian writers
- List of people from Chennai
