= Nithya Ravindar =

Indian actress

- Born: Nithya Shanthi
- Other name: Shanthi
- Occupations: Actress, Dubbing artist
- Years active: 1969-Present
- Spouse(s): K.Ravindran (m.1987-present)
- Children: Arjun; Janani

Nithya Ravindar is an Indian actress and dubbing artist who works primarily in Malayalam and Tamil films and television.

== Background and career ==
Her father was a government employee and mother was a house wife. Her father had a drama troupe and she started as child artist in her father's dramas. She has one younger sister, Jayasree and one elder sister, Kalyani . She had her primary education from Stella Matutina College of Education, Chennai till eighth grade. Due to shortage in attendance she shifted to Government girls high school. She dropped her studies at ninth grade since she became busy with movies by then. Nithya started her film career as a child artist in Kuruthikkalam, a Malayalam movie in 1969. She went on to act in few movies as a child artist and later became a heroine in Malayalam cinema. She had acted in few Tamil and Telugu movies as well. She is married to Ravindran, a Cameraman in Tamil movies. The couple has a daughter, Janani and a son, Arjun. She is a voice artist also in Tamil-language films.

== Television ==
| Year | Title | Role | Language | Channel |
|---|---|---|---|---|
| | Kurangu Manasu | | Tamil | |
| | Kanniyam Kirthika Sivakavitha | | Malayalam | Doordarshan |
| 1986 | Here is Crazy | | Tamil | Doordarshan |
| 1988 | Ladies Hostel | Manka | Tamil | Doordarshan |
| 1989 | Smrithikal | | Malayalam | Doordarshan |
| 1995–1996 | Raghuvamsam | | Tamil | Sun TV |
| 1996–1998 | Costly Mapillai | | Tamil | Sun TV |
| 1996 | Marmadesam | Vidhya's sister | Tamil | Sun TV |
| 1997–2002 | Nimmadhi Ungal Choice 5 | | Tamil | Sun TV |
| 1998 | Jannal - Sila Nijangal Sila Nyayangal | | Tamil | Sun TV |
| 1998–1999 | Akshaya | Anandhi | Tamil | Sun TV |
| 1999–2002 | Galatta Kudumbam | | Tamil | Sun TV |
| 1999–2002 | Sondhamae Endrallum | | Tamil | Sun TV |
| 1999–2002 | Pushpanjali | | Tamil | Sun TV |
| 2000–2001 | Anandha Bhavan | Jaya | Tamil | Sun TV |
| 2001–2002 | Soolam | | Tamil | Sun TV |
| 2001–2004 | Velan | | Tamil | Sun TV |
| 2001–2002 | Kelunga Maamiyare | | Tamil | Sun TV |
| 2001–2004 | Alai Osai | | Tamil | Sun TV |
| 2001 | Alaigal | Seetha | Tamil | Sun TV |
| 2001 | Jyothi | Madhangi | Telugu | Gemini TV |
| 2002–2004 | Amma | | Tamil | Sun TV |
| 2002–2004 | Agal Vilakkugal | | Tamil | Sun TV |
| 2002–2004 | Kungumam | | Tamil | Sun TV |
| 2002–2003 | Veetukku Veedu Looty | Chellamma aka Pachaiyamma | Tamil | Jaya TV |
| 2002–2003 | Sigaram | | Tamil | Sun TV |
| 2003 | Appa | | Tamil | Sun TV |
| 2003–2007 | Therkappu Kalai Theeratha | | Tamil | Sun TV |
| 2003–2007 | Avargal | | Tamil | Sun TV |
| 2004 | Shakthi | | Tamil | Jaya TV |
| 2004 | Akka | | Telugu | Gemini TV |
| 2004 | Deivam | | Telugu | Gemini TV |
| 2004–2006 | Chidambara Rahasiyam | Sivagami | Tamil | Sun TV |
| 2004–2006 | Kannavaruvagga | | Tamil | Sun TV |
| 2004–2007 | Sorgam | | Tamil | Sun TV |
| 2004–2007 | Raja Rajeshwari | | Tamil | Sun TV |
| 2004–2007 | Kalki | | Tamil | Jaya TV |
| 2004–2008 | Imsai Arasigal | | Tamil | Sun TV |
| 2005 | Nisha Kanthi | | Tamil | Sun TV |
| 2005–2006 | Manaivi | | Tamil | Sun TV |
| 2005–2006 | Deerga Sumangali | | Tamil | Sun TV |
| 2005–2006 | Selvangal | | Tamil | Sun TV |
| 2005–2006 | Alli Rajjiyam | Kokila | Tamil | Sun TV |
| 2005–2006 | Nilavai Pidippom | | Tamil | Raj TV |
| 2005–2007 | Mugangal | | Tamil | Sun TV |
| 2005–2007 | Malargal | Saradha | Tamil | Sun TV |
| 2005–2007 | Muhurtham | | Tamil | Sun TV |
| 2005–2007 | Vepilaikari | | Tamil | Sun TV |
| 2005–2007 | Nimmadhi | | Tamil | Sun TV |
| 2005–2008 | Aarthi | | Tamil | Raj TV |
| 2006 | Athu Matum Ragasiyam | | Tamil | Sun TV |
| 2006–2007 | Surya | | Tamil | Sun TV |
| 2006–2008 | Chellamadi Nee Enakku | | Tamil | Sun TV |
| 2007 | Paasam | | Tamil | Sun TV |
| 2007 | Naanayam | | Tamil | Sun TV |
| 2007–2010 | Vasantham | Kamakshi | Tamil | Sun TV |
| 2008 | Nagavalli | Bhagyarathi | Tamil | Sun TV |
| 2008 | Simran Thirai | | Tamil | Jaya TV |
| 2008 | Azhagana Natkal | | Tamil | Kalaignar TV |
| 2008–2011 | Geethanjali | | Tamil | Raj TV |
| 2009–2010 | Senthoora Poove | | Tamil | Sun TV |
| 2009–2010 | Thirupavai | Mythili | Tamil | Sun TV |
| 2009 | Rudra | Menaka | Tamil | Zee Tamil |
| 2009–2012 | Uravugal | Rajeshwari | Tamil | Sun TV |
| 2009–2010 | Megala | | Tamil | Sun TV |
| 2009–2010 | Karunamanjari | | Tamil | Raj TV |
| 2009–2011 | Kodi Mullai | | Tamil | Raj TV |
| 2010–2012 | Anupallavi | Gayathri | Tamil | Sun TV |
| 2010–2012 | Pondati Thevai | Maami | Tamil | Sun TV |
| 2010–2012 | Mama Maaple | | Tamil | Sun TV |
| 2011–2013 | Marudhani | | Tamil | Sun TV |
| 2011–2016 | Azhagi | Major Amma | Tamil | Sun TV |
| 2011–2014 | Ilavarasi | Shyamala | Tamil | Sun TV |
| 2012–2014 | Paartha Gnabagam Illayo | | Tamil | Kalaignar TV |
| 2012 | Veediyal Pudithu - Micro Thodar Macro Sinthanaigal | | Tamil | Raj TV |
| 2013 | Uthiripookal | Manomami | Tamil | Sun TV |
| 2013–2016 | Devathai | | Tamil | Sun TV |
| 2013–2014 | Kurinji Malar | Lakshmi | Tamil | Kalaignar TV |
| 2014–2015 | Vaazhve Dhaayam | | Tamil | Doordarshan |
| 2014 | Karai (10 Mani Kathaigal) | | Tamil | Sun TV |
| 2014–2015 | Vani Rani | Savithri | Tamil | Sun TV |
| 2015–2016 | Sabitha Engira Sabapathi | Saraswathi | Tamil | Raj TV |
| 2015 | Apoorva Raagangal | Karpagam | Tamil | Sun TV |
| 2015 | Priyasaki | Damayanthi | Tamil | Zee Tamil |
| 2017–2018 | Okariki Okaru | | Telugu | ETV |
| 2018–2020 | Minnale | Amudha | Tamil | Sun TV |
| 2018 | Saravanan Meenatchi (season 3) | Sivagami Ammal | Tamil | Star Vijay |
| 2018–2019 | Aranmanai Kili | Yamuna | Tamil | Star Vijay |
| 2019–2020 | Rasaathi | Saraswathi | Tamil | Sun TV |
| 2020–2021 | Kannana Kanne | Pushpa | Tamil | Sun TV |
| 2021 | Pudhu Pudhu Arthangal | Kamala | Tamil | Zee Tamil |
| 2021–2022 | Namma Veetu Ponnu | Visalatchi | Tamil | Star Vijay |
| 2021–2022 | Thalattu | Peri Aayi | Tamil | Sun TV |
| 2023 | Priyamaana Thozhi | Periyyayi | Tamil | Sun TV |
| 2024–present | Lakshmi | Gowri | Tamil | Sun TV |
| 2025 | Office | Paari's mother | Tamil | JioHotstar |
| 2025–present | Ayali | Padma | Tamil | Zee Tamil |
| 2026 | Gettimelam | Lakshmi | Tamil | Zee Tamil |

== Filmography ==
| Year | Title | Role | Language | Notes |
|---|---|---|---|---|
| 1969 | Kuruthikkalam | | Malayalam | |
| 1978 | Mariamman Thiruvizha | | Tamil | |
| 1979 | Pambaram | | Malayalam | |
| 1980 | Kudumbam Oru Kadambam | Mythili | Tamil | |
| 1980 | Savithiri | | Tamil | |
| 1980 | Lorry | Rani | Malayalam | |
| 1980 | Maniyan Pilla Adhava Maniyan Pilla | Raseena | Malayalam | |
| 1980 | Ashwaradham | Shanti | Malayalam | |
| 1981 | Rani | | Tamil | |
| 1981 | Mayilppeeli | | Malayalam | |
| 1982 | Anthiveyilile Ponnu | | Malayalam | |
| 1982 | Paanjajanyam | Sarada | Malayalam | |
| 1982 | Theerpu | Seetha | Tamil | |
| 1982 | Kurukkante Kalyanam | Sainaba | Malayalam | |
| 1982 | Enikkum Oru Divasam | Usha | Malayalam | |
| 1982 | Football | | Malayalam | |
| 1982 | Post Mortem | | Malayalam | |
| 1982 | Chiriyo Chiri | Neena | Malayalam | |
| 1982 | Snehapoorvam Meera | | Malayalam | |
| 1982 | Velicham Vitharunna Penkutty | Nithya | Malayalam | |
| 1983 | Naseema | Usha | Malayalam | |
| 1983 | Coolie | Santhi | Malayalam | |
| 1983 | Antha Sila Naatkal | | Tamil | |
| 1983 | Theeram Thedunna Thira | Nurse | Malayalam | |
| 1983 | Ee Yugam | Geetha | Malayalam | |
| 1983 | Oru Swakaryam | Kanakam | Malayalam | |
| 1983 | Kattathe Kilikkoodu | | Malayalam | |
| 1983 | Khaidi | Suryam's sister | Telugu | |
| 1984 | Onnum Mindatha Bharya | Roohiya | Malayalam | |
| 1984 | Krishna Guruvaayoorappa | Bhama | Malayalam | |
| 1984 | Vetta | | Malayalam | |
| 1984 | Swathi | | Telugu | |
| 1984 | Vepraalam | Anu | Malayalam | |
| 1984 | Dhavani Kanavugal | | Tamil | |
| 1985 | Uyarndha Ullam | | Tamil | |
| 1985 | Chillu Kottaram | | Malayalam | |
| 1985 | Nyayam Meere Cheppali | Prabhakar's sister | Telugu | |
| 1986 | Manavudu Danavudu | | Telugu | |
| 1986 | Sirivennela | Samyuktha | Telugu | credited as Samyuktha |
| 1987 | Aalappirandhavan | | Tamil | |
| 1987 | Swayamkrushi | | Telugu | |
| 1988 | Raktha Samharam | | Telugu | |
| 1995 | Naan Petha Magane | | Tamil | |
| 1999 | Kudumba Sangili | | Tamil | |
| 2000 | Alaipayuthey | Nair's wife | Tamil | |
| 2001 | Sigamani Ramamani | Sundaramoorthy's wife | Tamil | |
| 2002 | Pammal K. Sambandam | Rajeswari's mother | Tamil | |
| 2002 | Mutham | Sudha's mother | Tamil | |
| 2003 | Anbe Anbe | Sivagami | Tamil | |
| 2003 | Vadakku Vaasal | Murali's sister | Tamil | |
| 2004 | Vaanam Vasappadum | Ganesan's wife | Tamil | |
| 2009 | Kannukulle | | Tamil | |
| 2010 | Uthamaputhiran | Bharatham Sundaram | Tamil | |
| 2014 | Megha | Mugilan's Mother | Tamil | |
| 2017 | Saravanan Irukka Bayamaen | Thenmozhi's mother | Tamil | |
| 2017 | Thondan | | Tamil | |
| 2018 | Onaaigal Jakkiradhai | Anjali's mother | Tamil | |
| 2019 | Puppy | Prabhu's mother | Tamil | |
| 2021 | Atrangi Re | Vishu's mother | Hindi | |
| 2022 | Naai Sekar | Sekar's mother | Tamil | |

== Dubbing credits ==
=== Movies ===
| Year | Film | For Whom |
|---|---|---|
| 1982 | Engeyo Ketta Kural | Adult Meena |
| 1988 | En Thangachi Padichava | Rupini |
| 1988 | En Vazhi Thani Vazhi | Nishanthi |
| 1988 | Dhayam Onnu | Rekha |
| 1990 | Anthi Varum Neram | Latha |
| 1990 | Urudhi Mozhi | Shanthini |
| 1991 | Anbu Sangili | Subisha |
| 1991 | Oorellam Un Pattu | Aishwarya |
| 1992 | Annaamalai | Rekha |
| 1992 | Government Mappillai | Kasthuri |
| 1992 | Chinna Poovai Killathe | Meenakshi |
| 1992 | Daddy | Renuka |
| 1992 | Suyamariyadhai | Pallavi |
| 1992 | Kizhaku Veluthachu | Aishwarya |
| 1992 | Vaaname Ellai | Ramya Krishnan |
| 1993 | Naan Pesa Ninaipathellam | Latha |
| 1993 | Manbumigu Mestri | Roja |
| 1994 | Anbalayam | Renuka Shahane |
| 1995 | Atha Maga Rathiname | Viji |
| 1995 | Pasumpon | Shenbaga |
| 1995 | Baasha | Shenbaga |
| 1995 | Rowdy Boss | Rambha |
| 1996 | Vaikarai Pookkal | Dharani |
| 1996 | Thedi Vandha Raasa | Ilavarasi |
| 1996 | Pudhu Nilavu | Ilavarasi |
| 1996 | Enakkoru Magan Pirappan | Anju Aravind |
| 1996 | Gopala Gopala | Anju |
| 1997 | Thaali Pudhusu | Kalaranjini |
| 1997 | Vivasaayi Magan | Anuja |
| 2000 | Snegithiye | Ishita Arun |
| 2002 | Baba | Seema |
| 2002 | Run | Rajashree |
| 2002 | Bagavathi | Seema |
| 2003 | Anbe Sivam | Seema |
| 2003 | Jayam | Nalini |
| 2003 | Arasu | Sudha |
| 2004 | Jai | Seetha |
| 2005 | Jithan | Nalini |
| 2005 | London | Nalini |
| 2005 | Sukran | Nalini |
| 2005 | Priyasakhi | Rekha |
| 2006 | Paramasivan | Seetha |
| 2006 | Kadhale En Kadhale | Chitra Shenoy |
| 2006 | Amirtham | Rekha |
| 2006 | Parijatham | Roja |
| 2006 | Kurukshetram | Roja |
| 2006 | Adaikalam | Nalini |
| 2007 | Manikanda | Nalini |
| 2007 | 18 Vayasu Puyale | Nalini |
| 2007 | Kuttrapathirikai | Roja |
| 2007 | Veerappu | Sumithra |
| 2007 | Mudhal Kanave | Rajyalakshmi |
| 2008 | Kaalai | Seema |
| 2008 | Jodhaa Akbar (Tamil Dubbed Version) | Poonam Sinha |
| 2008 | Maanavan Ninaithal | Nalini |
| 2008 | Azhagu Nilayam | Nalini |
| 2009 | Iru Nadhigal | Nalini |
| 2009 | Mariyadhai | Ambika |
| 2009 | Enga Raasi Nalla Raasi | Nalini |
| 2010 | Kathai | Nalini |
| 2010 | Thillalangadi | Nalini |
| 2011 | Nagaram Marupakkam | Nalini |
| 2011 | Kasethan Kadavulada | Nalini |
| 2011 | Ponnar Shankar | Seetha |
| 2011 | Seedan | Sheela |
| 2011 | Payanam | Sri Lakshmi |
| 2012 | Thaandavam (Telugu dubbed version) | Saranya Ponvannan |
| 2013 | Theeya Velai Seiyyanum Kumaru | Nalini |
| 2015 | Sandamarutham | Nalini |
| 2015 | Agathinai | Nalini |
| 2015 | Kalai Vendhan | Nalini |
| 2016 | Saagasam | Nalini |
| 2016 | Ka Ka Ka Po | Nalini |
| 2016 | Thozha | Jayasudha |
| 2017 | Singam 3 | Nalini |
| 2018 | Kasu Mela Kasu | Nalini |
| 2019 | Kaithi | Malavika Avinash |
| 2020 | Ayya Ullen Ayya | Nalini |
| 2021 | Maara | Seema |
| 2021 | Thalaivi | Bhagyashree |
| 2021 | Aranmanai 3 | Nalini |
| 2022 | Valimai | Sumithra |
| 2022 | Visithiran | Sudha Chandran |
| 2023 | Paatti Sollai Thattathe | Nalini |

=== Television ===
| Year | Title | For Whom |
|---|---|---|
| 1995 | Vizhuthugal | Rani |
| 1998–1999 | Akshaya | Babitha |
| 2000–2022 | All Tamil serials | Nalini |
| 2000–2001 | Krishnadasi | Anju |
| 2001-2002 | Kelunga Mamiyare Neengalum Marumagal Than | Seema |
| 2002 | Annamalai | Jyothi Lakshmi |
| 2002 | Nambikkai | Janavi |
| 2003–2004 | Chinna Papa Periya Papa | Kalpana |
| 2006–2007 | Raja Rajeswari | Venniradai Nirmala |
| 2009 | Arasi | Sudha Chandran |
| 2009–2010 | Rudra | Sri Lakshmi |
| 2009–2013 | Thangam | Seema |
| 2013 | Rajakumari | Geetha |
| 2013–2017 | Vamsam | Seema |
| 2019 | Chandrakumari | Viji Chandrasekhar |
| 2019–2020 | Kandukondain Kandukondain | Seema |
| 2020 | Roja | Vinaya Prasad |
| 2020–2021 | Suryavamsam | Poornima Bhagyaraj |
| 2020–2021 | Thirumathi Hitler | Ambika |
| 2021 | Kaatrukena Veli | Malavika Avinash |
| 2021 | Jothi | Seema |
| 2021 | Vellamal | Ambika |
| 2021–2022 | Enga Veetu Meenatchi | Poornima Bhagyaraj |
