= Raagu Kethu =

Indian Tamil-language film

- Theatrical release poster
- Directed by: Durai Balasundaram
- Written by: K. P. Arivanandam
- Produced by: Santhi Balasundaram
- Starring: P. Samuthirakani; Archana Kanthan; Sandhya Sree
- Cinematography: Mohan Prasanth
- Edited by: B. Lenin
- Music by: Sadanandam & Baranidharan
- Production company: Thamizharasan Theaters
- Distributed by: Viyasbarat Films
- Release date: 8 August 2025
- Country: India
- Language: Tamil

Raagu Kethu is a 2025 Indian Tamil-language film written and directed by Durai Balasundaram. The film stars P. Samuthirakani, Archana Kanthan, and Sandhya Sree in the lead roles. It is produced by Santhi Balasundaram under the banner of Thamizharasan Theaters.

== Cast ==
- P. Samuthirakani
- Archana Kanthan
- Sandhya Sree
- S.Anand
- Balasundaram
- Kasthuri

== Production ==
The film is written and directed by Durai Balasundaram, while the technical team consists of Mohan Prasanth as the cinematographer, B. Lenin as the editor, and Sadanandam and Baranidharan as the music director.

== Reception ==
Dina Thanthi critic wrote that "After many years, director Durai Balasundaram has made a full-length mythological story into a film in Tamil, targeting the month of Aadi."

Maalai Malar critic wrote that "They have given this Rahu Ketu film as a visual medium for the current generation of youth."

Dinakaran critic stated that "The film will appeal to spiritual lovers."
