= Vina Vidai Vettai Juniors =

- Also known as: Question, Answer, Hunt Juniors
- வினா விடை வேட்டை ஜூனியர்ஸ்
- Genre: Talk show
- Presented by: Kasthuri
- Country of origin: India
- Original language: Tamil
- No. of seasons: 2
- No. of episodes: 12

Production
- Camera setup: Multi-camera
- Running time: approx. 40-45 minutes per episode

Original release
- Network: Puthuyugam TV
- Release: 16 March – 15 June 2014

Vina Vidai Vettai Juniors (Tamil: வினா விடை வேட்டை ஜூனியர்ஸ்) (transl. Question, Answer, Hunt) is a 2014 Indian Tamil-language quiz show. It was broadcast on Puthuyugam TV from 16 March 2014 to 15 June 2014. It tests knowledge of Indian culture, sports, politics, history, and current affairs. Actress Kasthuri hosted the show.

The first season saw the top 16 colleges make it to the main show, Indian Institute of Technology Madras and PSG College of Arts and Science as the title winner and runner, followed by Anna University, Guindy in the third place in Vina Vidai Vettai Juniors. The winner and the runner-up were awarded cash prizes of Rs. 1,00,000 and Rs. 50,000, respectively.

The Quiz team S. Srinidhi, [X Standard], G.K. Sriram [X], and R. Balaji [IX] were awarded for the school and a cash prize of Rs.1 lakh.

Television star Vijay Adhiraj hosted the second season of Vina Vidai Vettai Juniors. Hariharan S, Siddharth Pillai, and Ashwin of Chettinad Vidyashram, R.A Puram, Chennai, won the quiz. The winners took home the winner's trophy, a team cash prize of 75,000 ₹, and one Atlas cycle each.
