= Rekha IPS =

Television series

- Genre: Police drama
- Screenplay by: Thavamani Vaseegaran
- Story by: Chithra Lakshmanan Dialogue; R. N. R. Manohar
- Directed by: B. Nithiyanantham; O. N. Rathnam
- Creative director: Subhaa Venkat
- Starring: Anu Hasan; Vijay Adhiraj; Sanjeev; Pollachi Babu; V.S.Raghavan; Shyam Ganesh; Brinda Das
- Theme music composer: C. Sathya
- Opening theme: "Sooriyanin Sooriyanin"
- Composers: Eswar; Gopal
- Country of origin: India
- Original language: Tamil
- No. of seasons: 2
- No. of episodes: 401

Production
- Producer: Subhaa Venkat
- Cinematography: E. Armstrong; B. Thyagarajan
- Camera setup: Multi-camera
- Running time: approx. 20-22 minutes per episode
- Production company: Pyramid Saimira Productions

Original release
- Network: Kalaignar TV
- Release: 2008 – 2010

Rekha IPS is a 2008 Indian Tamil-language police drama starring Anu Hasan, Vijay Adhiraj, Sanjeev, Priyadarshini, Pollachi Babu, V.S. Raghavan and Shyam Ganesh. It was aired on Kalaignar TV for 401 episodes. The show was directed by B. Nithiyanantham and O.N. Rathnam with the story by Chithra Lakshmanan.

From April 17, 2017, the show was re-launched in Kalaignar TV and it replaced by historical drama Thenpandi Singam.

== Synopsis ==
The story follows focusing on a Police officer, Rekha (Anu Hasan) who tries to find out her kidnapped sister several years before. Gowsik (Vijay Adhiraj) as her former lover subverts the ideas of Rekha makes everyone keeps their fingers crossed.

== Cast ==
=== Main cast ===
- Anu Hasan as Rekha a police officer with her matured performance as the police officer tries to find out her kidnapped sister several years before.
- Vijay Adhiraj as Gowsik
- Shridhar as (Rekha Husband)
- Shyam Ganesh as Ram (Radha younger Brother)
- Sanjeev
- Brinda Das as Radha

=== Additional cast ===
- Priyadharshini
- Pollachi Babu
- V.S. Raghavan
- Shari (Sadhana)
- Krithika
- Sri Lekha
- Baboos
- Sindhu Shyam
- Arthi
- Nanthakumar
- Ravi Varma
- Vinothraj
- Raviraj
- Kutty Ramesh
- Apser babu
- maninthar
- Priyanka as Anitha
- Minnal Deepa as Kavitha
