= Manithanum Marmangalum =

- Also known as: Human Mysteries
- மனிதனும் மர்மங்களும்
- Presented by: Madhan
- Country of origin: India
- Original language: Tamil
- No. of seasons: 1
- No. of episodes: 36

Production
- Camera setup: Multi-camera
- Running time: approx. 40-45 minutes per episode Monday to Wednesday at 9:00PM IST

Original release
- Network: Puthuyugam TV
- Release: 12 September – 30 November 2016

Manithanum Marmangalum (Tamil: மனிதனும் மர்மங்களும்) (transl. 'Human mysteries') is an Indian Tamil-language TV series about supernatural phenomena, including ghosts, strange places and incidents, and aliens, with a scientific commentary.

It aired from 12 September 2016 to 30 November 2016 on Puthuyugam TV every Monday to Wednesday at 9:00PM IST for 36 episodes and hosted by Madhan.
