= Aarthi (TV series) =

Tamil soap opera that aired on Raj TV

- Genre: Drama
- Written by: Devi Bala; Vimala Ganesh
- Directed by: K. Rangaraj; L. Raja
- Starring: Sithara; Vijay Adhiraj; Nithya Ravindran; Y. Vijaya; Deepa Venkat; Raja Ravindran; Manjari
- Theme music composer: Dhina
- Opening theme: "Aarthi"; Sadhana Sargam (Vocal); Vairamuthu (Lyrics)
- Original language: Tamil
- No. of seasons: 1
- No. of episodes: 171

Production
- Producers: AVM. Kumaran; AVM.K. Shanmugam
- Cinematography: K.Shiva
- Editors: VM.Thomas; P.Sekar; SRG. Vijayakannan
- Camera setup: Multi-camera
- Running time: approx. 20-21 minutes per episode
- Production company: AVM Productions

Original release
- Network: Raj TV
- Release: 3 January 2005 – 26 December 2008

Aarthi is a 2005 soap opera which aired on Raj TV. The show starred Sithara, Vijay Adhiraj, Raja Ravindra and Y. Vijaya. The serial was produced by AVM's 2nd son AVM. Kumaran along with his son AVM.K. Shanmugam for AVM Productions. The story, screenplay and dialogue was created by Devi Bala and it was directed by L. Raja and K. Rangaraj.

The music was composed by Dhina and the title song was penned by lyricist Vairamuthu and sung by Sadhana Sargam. The show ended with 1054 episodes.

== Cast ==
- Sithara as Aarthi
- Vijay Adhiraj as Santhosh
- Raja Ravindra as Santhosh-Post surgery
- Y. Vijaya as Parvathi (Santhosh's Aunt)
- Deepa Venkat
- Nithya Ravindran
- Manjari Vinodhini
- Shakti Kumar
- Ajay Kapoor
- Monicka
- Archana
- Seetha
- Bharath Kalyan
- Jhanvi
- Achamillai Gopi
- Jayanth
- Shilpa Mary Theresa
- Sivakavitha
- Premi
- Daniel Balaji
- SN.Lakshmi
- J. Lalitha
- Bombay Gnanam as Santhosh's Mother
- Delhi Kumar
- Shrikala Paramasivam
- Sairam
- M. Banumathi
- KS. Jayalakshmi
- Gayathri Priya
- Engineer Srinivas
- Santhi Anandraj
