= Vina Vidai Vettai =

Indian Tamil-language quiz show

- வினா விடை வேட்டை
- Genre: Quiz
- Presented by: Kasthuri
- Country of origin: India
- Original language: Tamil
- No. of seasons: 3
- No. of episodes: 14

Production
- Camera setup: Multi-camera
- Running time: approx. 40-45 minutes per episode

Original release
- Network: Puthuyugam TV
- Release: 10 November 2013 – 9 February 2014

Vina Vidai Vettai (Tamil: வினா விடை வேட்டை) is an Indian Tamil-language quiz show broadcast on Puthuyugam TV that aired every Sunday at 11AM from 10 November 2013 to 9 February 2014 IST for 14 episodes. It was a quiz show designed to test knowledge of Indian culture, sports, politics, history and current affairs. The show was hosted by actress Kasthuri.
