= Ponnu Veetukkaran =

- Title card
- Directed by: P. Vasu
- Written by: P. Vasu
- Produced by: N. Vishnu Ram
- Starring: Sathyaraj; Preetha Vijayakumar
- Cinematography: Ashok Rajan
- Edited by: P. Mohan Raj
- Music by: Ilaiyaraaja
- Production company: Ganga Gowri Productions
- Release date: 15 January 1999
- Running time: 141 minutes
- Country: India
- Language: Tamil

Ponnu Veetukkaran is a 1999 Indian Tamil-language comedy drama film written and directed by P. Vasu. The film stars Sathyaraj and Preetha Vijayakumar, while Vijay Adhiraj, Goundamani, Vijayakumar and Radharavi play supporting roles. It was released on 15 January 1999.

== Plot ==
Jeeva is the perfect handyman and the protector of a big rich family of the Tamil Country, constituted by Gangadaran, Muralidaran, and Giridaran. These three brothers are spouses and fathers, each of several children. Traders of sarees precious, they hold one of the most beautiful and furthermore with the aim of the stores of the capital, so making their colossal fortune.

But what makes their happiness and their pride overcoat everything is Indu, the youngest child of this big welded family. Intelligent, beautiful and roguish as one pleases, she cheers up, illuminates with her presence their everyday life, as well as their cousin, the useless Yégambharam, but nevertheless very nice, always in conflict with his father Védatchalam, the dean moved by the family.

Jeeva comes from a family which was always in the service of three brothers and it since its father who was him with theirs, as driver. Far from maintaining employeur-d'employee's standard relation, the brothers' father got used to fraternizing with Jeeva's father to the point that they became as brother. Jeeva frequented one time, the same schools as three brothers.

Nevertheless, a misfortune struck the family. Their respective parents were victims of a car accident. His wives were killed instantly. Whereas the fathers, in the agony, made promise to their children to part never and on no account, of Jeeva and mutually. The good mood and the know-how and the practical sense of Jeeva put everybody all right. He shares a beautiful complicity with Indu, who is sometimes badly understood outside the family circle and gives rise to gossips maintained by the fact that Jeeva remains incorrigible bachelor. In the truth, he dreads that his future wife (if he finds one) tears away him from his family of adoption and house thus only, to avoid this problem, but regrettably, this happiness is going to be again broken. Indeed, Indu loses her husband, just before their honeymoon, a few days after their marriage celebrated in formal dinners, with all the splendor. Everybody is bewildered and appalled.

Jeeva, who had just left the marriage, knows only after his return about the death of the son-in-law. Annihilated as everybody, at the beginning, Jeeva quickly gets over it, by giving for mission to find a new pretender for Indu. Nevertheless, he finds the one person in a million, in the person of Muthu, an old acquaintance of Indu. Assisted by Yégambharam, Jeeva helps as best he can Muthu to conquer Indu, in spite of the secular obstacles against the widows considered as one bet in India.

== Cast ==
- Sathyaraj as Jeeva
- Preetha Vijayakumar as Indu (5th among siblings)
- Goundamani as Ekambharam also Charles
- Vijayakumar as Indu's father-in-law
- Radharavi as Gangadaran (1st brother)
- Ilavarasan as Muralidaran (2nd brother)
- Kazan Khan as Giridaran (3rd brother)
- Meera as Indu's sister (4th among siblings)
- Fathima Babu as Gangadaran's wife
- Vijay Adhiraj as Muthu
- K. S. Ravikumar as Manogar, Muthu's father
- Gandhimathi as Old Widow
- Nizhalgal Ravi as Groom
- Rajiv as the brothers' father
- Ravikumar as Jeeva's father
- Vichithra as Diana, Yégambharam's girlfriend
- Khushbu (Guest Appearance) as Jeeva's wife

== Soundtrack ==
The music was composed by Ilaiyaraaja.

Song	Singers	Lyrics	Length
"Annan Ivan"	S. P. Balasubrahmanyam	Gangai Amaran	04:37
"Nandhavana Kuyile I"	Hariharan	Palani Bharathi	05:01
"Nandhavana Kuyile II"	Ilaiyaraaja	Palani Bharathi	04:56
"Ponnu Veettu"	S. P. Balasubrahmanyam	Gangai Amaran	04:56
"Ilaya Nilave"	Srinivas, Bhavatharini	Palani Bharathi	05:05
"Kettukamma"	Mano	Palani Bharathi	05:05

== Release and reception ==
The film was initially scheduled to release on 19 October 1998 during Diwali, but was delayed by three months. D. S. Ramanujam of The Hindu wrote, "More than a dozen leading artistes have participated making it enjoyable. It is a different role for Satyaraj [...] The role fits him like a glove". He added, "It is not an easy task to provide dialogues for the many artistes but the director manages this fairly well".
