= Uravai Thedi =

- Genre: Reality justice
- Created by: K. C. Prabhakaran
- Directed by: K. C. Prabhakaran
- Creative director: K. C. Prabhakaran
- Presented by: Viji Chandrasekhar
- Theme music composer: Rizwan
- Opening theme: Rizwan
- Country of origin: India
- Original language: Tamil
- No. of seasons: 1
- No. of episodes: 26

Production
- Producer: Puthuyugam TV
- Editors: Rafi, Jo
- Camera setup: Multi-camera
- Running time: 40-45 minutes

Original release
- Network: Puthuyugam TV
- Release: 8 September – 2 December 2016

Uravai Thedi (English: Looking for relationship) is a 2016 Indian Tamil-language reality justice television series. It aired from 8 September 2016 to 2 December 2016 on Puthuyugam TV every Thursday and Friday at 9:00PM IST for 26 episodes. The Show host by Viji Chandrasekhar. The series premiered on the television channel, Puthuyugam TV and was a platform for reunited with family.

== List of episodes ==
Episode	Family	Telecast date
1	Son reunited with family after 18 years	8 September 2016
2	Muthiah Re-unites with his family after 24 years	9 September 2016
3	Long Lost friends reunite after 15 years	15 September 2016
4	Brothers re-unite after 22 years	16 September 2016
5	25 வருடங்களுக்குப் பிறகு குடும்பத்தினரை சந்தித்த தருணம்	22 September 2016
6	Disabled daughter & mother meet after 22 years	23 September 2016
7	Visually challenged girl searching for her father for 28 Years	29 September 2016
8	Two Children searching for their relatives for 9 years	30 September 2016
9	Brother and Sister re-union after 21 years	6 October 2016
10	Mother & 2 children from 3 different directions Meet Each Other	7 October 2016
11	Friends re-unite with their families after 13 years Teacher meets her students after 8 years	13 October 2016
12	A mother's final wish to meet son after 25 years	14 October 2016
13	Actor Shiva meets his friend after 15 years Meeting of two poles after 42 years	20 October 2016
14	Priya Re-joining with her Family Members after 10 Years	21 October 2016
15	Boy meets his father after 6 years Stage artists meet after 15 years	27 October 2016
16	Daughter searching for her mother's relatives Daughter longing to see her unseen father's face for the last 30 years Daughter Searches for her mother and sister for the last 31 years Sister Searches for her brother after 41 years People search for their blood relations for years	28 October 2016
17	Sister's 20 years search for her younger brother Looking for her mother, who left home in a rage, 13 years ago Family search for their son, who went missing 14 years ago Mother searching for her son for 14 Years; People Search for their blood relations for years Searching for his elder brother for the last 17 years	3 November 2016
18	Lost at 12, sister meets her family 30 years	4 September 2016
19	தனக்கு உதவிய ஆசிரியர்களை 10 வருடங்களுக்கு பிறகு சந்தித்த மாணவன் தன் உயிரைக் காப்பாற்றியவர்களை 15 வருடங்களுக்குப் பிறகு சந்தித்த தருணம் தனக்கு உதவியவர்களை சந்தித்த நெஞ்சங்கள்	10 November 2016
20	10 வருடமாக மகனையும், பேத்தியையும் பார்க்க துடிக்கும் மூதாட்டி	11 November 2016
21	25 வருடங்களாக தாயை பிரிந்து வாழ்ந்த மகள்	17 November 2016
22	பிறந்ததிலிருந்து அப்பாவை பார்க்காத மகள்	18 November 2016
23	22 வருடங்களுக்குப் பிறகு சந்தித்துக் கொண்ட தோழிகள்	24 November 2016
25	தொலைந்த உறவுகளை தேடும் நெஞ்சங்கள் தொலைந்த மகனை தேடும் குடும்பம் தொலைந்த மகனை தேடும் தாய் தொலைந்த மகனை தேடும் குடும்பம் தனது பெற்றோரைத் தேடும் மகன்	25 November 2016
26	2015 சென்னை பெரு வெள்ளம்.. உயிர்பிழைத்தவர்களும்..உதவியவர்களும்	2 December 2016
