= Padmalatha =

Indian playback singer

- Occupation: Playback singer

Padmalatha is an Indian playback singer who was born in Chennai, India. She rose to her fame after the song "Kannale Kannale" from the movie Thani Oruvan topped the charts when the album released. She is best known for songs like "Kaadhale Kaadhale", "Kannale Kannale", "Adiye Azhagae" and "Aadaludan Paadalai Kettu" in Tamil. Her Telugu songs include "Pareshanuraaa", "Choosa Choosa", and "Chali Gaali Chuudduu".

== Discography ==
Year	Film title	Song title	Language	Composer(s)
2002	Thennavan	"Vatta Vatta"	Tamil	Yuvan Shankar Raja
2004	Azhagesan	"Jintha Jinakku Jintha"	Tamil	Deva
2004	Azhagesan	"Kala Kalavena"	Tamil	Deva
2004	Kaadhal Thirudaa	"Oru Vaarthai"	Tamil	Bharani
2008	Pournami (Tamil dubbed)	"Poovaiya Thevathaiya"	Tamil	Devi Sri Prasad
2010	Gudu Gudu Gunjam	"Dora Vayasu Chinnadi" (Remix)	Telugu	Veeru K
2011	Aanmai Thavarael	"Vazhiyil Thulaindhu"	Tamil	Mariya Manohar
2013	Kutti Puli	"Aruvaakaaran"	Tamil	Ghibran
2013	Naiyaandi	"Inikka Inikka"	Tamil	Ghibran
2013	Apple Penne	"Paadu Paadu"	Tamil	Mani Sharma
2013	Chandra	"Omkaraminum"	Tamil	Gowtham Srivatsa
2014	Amara Kaaviyam	"Edhedho Ennamvandhu"	Tamil	Ghibran
2014	Amara Kaaviyam	"Thaagam Theerea"	Tamil	Ghibran
2015	Uttama Villain	"Kadhalaam Kadavul Mun"	Tamil	Ghibran
2015	Uttama Villain	"Mutharasan Kadhai"	Tamil	Ghibran
2015	Uttama Villain	"Kaanuke Bandu Malli"	Telugu	Ghibran
2015	Soan Papdi	"Hey Chocolates"	Tamil	Dhanraj Manickam
2015	Indru Netru Naalai	"Kadhale Kadhale"	Tamil	Hiphop Tamizha
2015	Orange Mittai	"Payanangal Thodarudhae"	Tamil	Justin Prabhakaran
2015	Thani Oruvan	"Kannala Kannala" (The Melting Point of Love)	Tamil	Hiphop Tamizha
2016	Aranmanai 2	"Maayaa Maayaa"	Tamil	Hiphop Tamizha
2016	Kalavati 2	"Kala Oho Kala"	Telugu	Hiphop Tamizha
2016	Oru Naal Koothu	"Patta Podunga Ji" "Adiye Azhagae"	Tamil	Justin Prabhakaran
2016	Dhruva	"Choosa Choosa"	Telugu	Hiphop Tamizha
2016	Dhruva	"Pareshanuraaa"	Telugu	Hiphop Tamizha
2016	Gentleman	"Chali Gaali Chuudduu"	Telugu	Mani Sharma
2017	Motta Shiva Ketta Shiva	"Hara Hara Mahadevaki"	Tamil	Amresh Ganesh
2017	Motta Shiva Ketta Shiva	"Adaludan Paadalai Kettu"	Tamil	Amresh Ganesh
2017	8 Thottakkal	"Andhi Saayura Neram"	Tamil	Sundaramurthy K S
2017	Kavan	"Theeratha Vilayattu Pillai"	Tamil	Hiphop Tamizha
2017	Magalir Mattum	"Ghandhaari Yaaro"	Tamil	Ghibran
2017	Magalir Mattum	"Time Passukosaram"	Tamil	Ghibran
2017	Theeran Adhigaaram Ondru	"Tinga Tinga" (Hindi)	Tamil	Ghibran
2017	Jeyadev	"Nuvvundipo"	Telugu	Manisharma
2017	Valla Desam	"Vaa Thanimayil"	Tamil	L. V. Muthukumarasamy and R. K. Sundar
2018	Kalakalappu 2	"Krishna Mukundha"	Tamil	Hiphop Tamizha
2018	Agnyaathavaasi	"Swagatham Krishna"	Telugu	Anirudh Ravichander
2018	Krishnarjuna Yudham	"Thaaney Vaachhindanaa"	Telugu	Hiphop Tamizha
2018	Devadas	"Chettu Kinda Doctor"	Telugu	Mani Sharma
2018	Thimiru Pudichavan	"Kannadi"	Tamil	Vijay Antony
2019	Thadam	"Inayae"	Tamil	Arun Raj
2021	Maara	"Theeranadhi"	Tamil	Ghibran
2021	Sivakumarin Sabadham	"Neruppa Irupaan"	Tamil	Hiphop Tamizha
2023	Agent	"Endhe Endhe"	Telugu	Hiphop Tamizha

== Other works ==
Year	Title	Language	Work
2017	Sa Re Ga Ma Pa Lil Champs	Tamil	Grand Jury Panel
