= Merupu =

- Poster
- Directed by: Gopichand Nadella
- Written by: Ganapathi Rao Kommanapall (dialogues)
- Screenplay by: Gopichand Nadella
- Story by: Gopichand Nadella
- Produced by: Kamini Venkateswara Rao
- Starring: Anand; Kasthuri; Vikram
- Cinematography: C. Ramprasad
- Edited by: Bhaskar
- Music by: Bharadwaj
- Release date: 22 November 1996
- Country: India
- Language: Telugu

Merupu (transl. Lightning) is a 1996 Indian Telugu romantic thriller film, written by Ganapathi Rao Kommanapall and directed by Gopichand Nadella. The film stars Anand, Kasthuri, and Vikram in the leading roles, while Brahmanandam plays a supporting role. The film was later dubbed and released in Tamil as Miss Madras by Sai Bhagyashree Films, and titled as such owing to the actress's triumph at the Miss Madras beauty pageant in 1994.

== Cast ==
- Anand as Naveen
- Kasthuri as Prema
- Vikram as Guru
- Brahmanandam as Traffic Police Inspector
- Mallikarjuna Rao
- Siva Parvathi
- Uttej as Traffic Police Officer
- Venu Madhav

== Production ==
The film was loosely based on the 1991 English psychological thriller film, Sleeping with the Enemy. During the making of the film, the writer Kommanapalli Ganapathi Rao associated with newcomer Trivikram Srinivas on working on the script and the pair worked together for ten days. Srinivas later became disassociated with the project as a result of not being paid and the team's shift to shoot portions in Gandipet.

== Soundtrack ==
Merupu

Soundtrack album by Bharadwaj
- Genre: Feature film soundtrack
- Language: Telugu
- Producer: Bharadwaj

The soundtrack album was composed by Bharadwaj.

Track list
No.	Title	Lyrics	Singer(s)	Length
1.	"Paruvala Silpam"	Jonnavittula	Unnikrishnan, Anuradha Sriram
2.	"Edolaanga Vunnadi"	Sirivennela	Aruna, Chithra, chorus
3.	"O.K. O.K."	Sirivennela	Mano, Anuradha Sriram
4.	"Chalo Chalo Hrudayama"	Sirivennela	Anupama
5.	"Paruvala Silpam"	Jonnavittula	Unnikrishnan, Anuradha Sriram
6.	"Lovelo Padithe Bhale Bhale"	Samavedam Shanmukha Sarma	Mano, chorus
