= Kasthuri Shankar =

Indian actress

- Occupations: Actress; politician; model
- Years active: 1991-present
- Political party: Bharatiya Janata Party (2025–present)
- Spouse: Ravikumar
- Children: 2

Kasthuri Shankar is an Indian actress, politician, model and television presenter who has appeared in Tamil, Telugu, Malayalam and Kannada language films.

== Personal life ==
She was born into a Brahmin family to Sumathi, a lawyer, and P.S. Shankar. She has a younger brother. She is married and has a son and a daughter. Her daughter is a leukemia survivor.

== Career ==
After graduation from Ethiraj College for Women, Shankar won Miss Chennai in 1992. In the same year, she won the Femina Miss Madras beauty pageant too. While studying in college, she started her career in modelling over interest in the domain. Not only was she a successful model, but also, she was a finalist in the BBC's Mastermind India in 2000. Her acting career began in 1991 with the film, Aatha Un Koyilile (1991). From working on small budget Tamil films, she went on to work into more mainstream movies alongside legends, such as Kamal Haasan in Indian (1996). A 30-minute documentary film, Kasthuri: A South Indian Film Star, was released as a tribute to her success in the film industry. She gained attention for her acting skills in Annamayya (1997) and dance performance in Kaadhal Kavithai (1998).

She later made a comeback to hosting television-based quiz shows in the 2010s, and worked on Vina Vidai Vettai for Puthuyugam TV. Her debut comeback film was Malai Malai (2009). She also notably portrayed a key supporting role as an investigative agent in Adhik Ravichandran's Anbanavan Asaradhavan Adangadhavan (2017), appearing alongside Silambarasan.

After rejecting the opportunity to appear on the Tamil reality television show Bigg Boss Tamil in 2018, she joined the third season of the show in 2019 as a wildcard entry contestant. After that, she made her comeback to Telugu audience in Intinti Gruhalakshmi serial which airs on Star Maa now.

== Political career ==
Shankar campaigned for the Bharatiya Janata party (BJP) in Madurai during the 2024 Indian general elections. She joined the party on 15 August 2025 at Madurai.

== Other work ==
=== Columns ===
In the late 1990s, Shankar wrote a weekly column titled "Keep It Simple Stupid" in the Kumudham magazine.

=== Topless photoshoot ===
In 2014, she was photographed topless and half-nude as a part of Jade Beall's book The Bodies of Mothers: A Beautiful Body Project.

== Social commentary and controversies ==
Shankar is an active commentator regarding social issues through an occasional column with the Times of India and via Twitter, and her tweets have sometimes elicited debate in the media. In early 2017, she questioned Rajinikanth's ability as a potential politician, and her opinion garnered criticism from the actor's fans. In late 2018, she criticised Rajinikanth's ignorance over the Rajiv Gandhi assassination case and engaged in a further exchange with Rajinikanth's supporters. Shankar spoke out as a part of the Me Too movement in India, suggesting that her reluctance to give into patriarchal behaviour meant that she was removed from several film projects. She revealed that one male actor took a particular vengeance against her for her rebuff to his advances, and subsequently made it difficult for her to work on other projects. She criticised directors Bharathiraja and S. Shankar in April 2019, she said director Bharathiraja and his son has black skin and they use North Indian girls with lighter skin in their movies while S. Shankar goes a long way and imports white skin foreign girls in his movies. While Shankar declares herself an Indian patriot, her husband and two children are all US-born American citizens. During the row over the comments made by DMK MP Elangovan against Hindi, Shankar criticized him stating that she was personally offended as she was of mixed lineage herself.

A person, who claimed himself to be actor Ajith's fan, had allegedly made sexist comments against Shankar in January 2020. A week after this, Shankar blasted him, by suggesting him to ask his mother or sister if he wants a woman for sex. She used the tag #dirtyajithfans, which started trending in India. Some fans of Ajith created #DirtyKasthuriAunty to counter this. A war of words continued and created a controversy.

On 17 November 2024, Shankar was arrested in Hyderabad following derogatory and controversial statements against the Telugu community settled in Tamil Nadu at an event organized by the Hindu Makkal Katchi demanding to create of an exclusive legislation to protect the Brahmin community on the lines of the PCR Act for the Scheduled Castes.

== Filmography ==
Year	Title	Role	Language	Notes
1991	Aatha Un Koyilile	Kasthuri	Tamil	
1991	Chakravarthy	Praseetha	Malayalam	
1991	Rasathi Varum Naal	Radha	Tamil	
1992	Government Mappillai	Mallaria	Tamil	
1992	Chinnavar	Meena	Tamil	
1992	Urimai Oonjaladugiradhu	Uma	Tamil	
1992	Senthamizh Pattu	Shanmathi	Tamil	
1992	Abhirami	Dhanam	Tamil	
1992	Gang War	Kaveri	Telugu	
1993	Rakkayi Koyil	Vellaiyamma	Tamil	
1993	Pudhiya Mugam	Raja's first wife	Tamil	
1993	Aathma	Uma	Tamil	
1993	Pass Mark	Shanthi	Tamil	
1993	Udan Pirappu	Sumathi	Tamil	
1993	Nippu Ravva	Bharathi	Telugu	
1993	Enga Muthalali	Kalyani	Tamil	
1994	Amaidhi Padai	Thayamma	Tamil	
1994	Watchman Vadivel	Radha	Tamil	
1994	Jaana	Kasturi	Kannada	
1994	Raja Pandi	Ponnuthaayi	Tamil	
1994	Thendral Varum Theru	Nalini	Tamil	
1995	Sindhu Bath	Shobana	Tamil	
1995	Chinna Mani	Chinna Mani	Tamil	
1995	Kolangal	Uma	Tamil	
1995	Aakaya Pookal	Kamakshi	Tamil	
1995	God Father	Aruna	Telugu	
1995	Agrajan	Sreedevi	Malayalam	
1995	Radholsavam	Chempakam	Malayalam	
1995	Aniyan Bava Chetan Bava	Ammu	Malayalam	
1996	Ibbara Naduve Muddina Aata		Kannada	
1996	Indian	Kasthuri	Tamil	
1996	Krishna	Lizy	Tamil	
1996	Soggadi Pellam	Jyothi	Telugu	
1996	Merupu	Prema	Telugu	
1996	Rendu Kutumbala Katha	Hema	Telugu	
1997	Chilakkottudu	Kasturi	Telugu	
1997	Ratha Yatra	Ganga	Telugu	
1997	Annamayya	Akkalamma	Telugu	
1997	Maa Ayana Bangaram		Telugu	
1997	Nazarr	Bansuri	Hindi	
1998	Mangalya Pallakku	Seethalakshmi	Malayalam	
1998	Thutta Mutta	Dr. Seema	Kannada	
1998	One Man Army	Kasthoori	Kannada	
1998	Sneham	Radhika	Malayalam	
1998	Kaadhal Kavidhai	Swapna	Tamil	
1999	Habba	Anu	Kannada	
1999	Suyamvaram	Uma	Tamil	
1999	Panchapandavar	Nandini	Malayalam	
2001	Engalukkum Kaalam Varum	Pooja	Tamil	
2001	Dosth		Tamil	Special appearance in the song "Hey Sal Sal"
2001	Akasa Veedhilo	Padma	Telugu	
2001	Premakke Sai	Vedha	Kannada	
2002	Adheena	Princess Adheena	Malayalam	
2009	Malai Malai	Lakshmi	Tamil	
2010	Tamizh Padam	Dancer	Tamil	Special appearance in the song "Kuthuvilakku"
2010	Gudu Gudu Gunjam	Malleeshwari	Telugu	
2010	Don Seenu	Lakshmi	Telugu	
2011	Pathinaaru	Ilavarasi	Tamil	Guest appearance
2011	Thoonga Nagaram		Tamil	Special appearance
2012	Naanga	Chithra	Tamil	
2013	Azhagan Azhagi		Tamil	Special appearance in the song "Ethuvarai Vaanam"
2013	Naan Rajavaga Pogiren	Bharathi	Tamil	
2014	Vadacurry	Satish's sister in law	Tamil	
2014	Naan Ponnu Ondru Kanden		Tamil	Special appearance in the song "Othaya Retaya"
2017	Anbanavan Asaradhavan Adangadhavan	Ruby	Tamil	
2017	Samanthakamani	Krishna's mother	Telugu	
2018	Traffic Ramasamy	Witness in court	Tamil	Guest appearance
2018	Tamizh Padam 2		Tamil	Special appearance in the song "Vaa Vaa Kaama"
2020	Velvet Nagaram	Gauri	Tamil	
2021	EPCO 302	S. Durga IPS	Tamil	
2022	Godfather	Brahma's mother	Telugu	
2023	Tamilarasan	Jagadeeswari	Tamil	
2023	Rayar Parambarai	Rayar's sister	Tamil	
2023	Striker		Tamil	
2024	Simbaa		Telugu	
2025	Devil's Double Next Level	Devaki and Shilpa	Tamil	Dual role
2025	Raagu Kethu		Tamil	
2025	Oho Enthan Baby	Ashwin's mother	Tamil	
2026	Breakfast	Gangadevi	Tamil	

=== Television ===
Year	Title	Role	Language	Network	Notes
	Eshtadanam		Malayalam	DD Malayalam	
1995	Kaiyalavu Manasu	Vani	Tamil	Sun TV	
2000	Mastermind India	Contestant	Tamil	BBC	
2003	Quiz Buzz	Host	Tamil	Raj TV	
2010	Sun Kudumbam Awards 2010	Host	Tamil	Sun TV	
2010	Star Singer	Special judge	Malayalam	Asianet	
2013–2014	Vina Vidai Vettai	Host	Tamil	Puthuyugam TV	
2014	Vina Vidai Vettai Juniors	Host	Tamil	Puthuyugam TV	
2014	Wow 2	Participant	Telugu	E TV	
2019	Bigg Boss Tamil 3	Contestant	Tamil	Star Vijay	Evicted; Day 63
2020–2024	Intinti Gruhalakshmi	Tulasi	Telugu	Star Maa	
2020	Cash	Participant	Telugu	ETV	
2020	Agni Natchathiram	Rudra	Tamil	Sun TV	Special Appearance
2021	Parampara	Indira	Telugu	Disney+ Hotstar	
2021	Sixth Sense	Participant	Telugu	Star Maa	
2022	Aruvi	Herself	Tamil	Sun TV	
2022	Sreedevi Dance Company	Herself	Telugu	ETV	
2024	Seethe Ramudiki Katnam	Ram's Mother	Telugu	Zee Telugu	Photographic Appearance
2024	Jhansi		Telugu	ETV	
2024	Jagadhatri	Sharmila Tagore	Telugu	Zee Telugu	Special Appearance
2025; 2026	Ayali	Archana	Tamil	Zee Tamil	
