= Geethanjali (2008 TV series) =

- Title card
- Genre: Drama
- Written by: Ragurajan
- Directed by: N.Sundareshwaran; MK.Arunthavaraja; K.siva
- Starring: Deepa Venkat; Vijay Adhiraj; Nithya Ravindran; Deepak Dinkar
- Original language: Tamil
- No. of seasons: 1
- No. of episodes: 1078

Production
- Producer: A.V.M.Kumaran
- Cinematography: Yuvan Saravanan
- Editor: K.Shankar
- Camera setup: Multi-camera
- Running time: approx. 28-31 minutes per episode
- Production company: AVM Productions

Original release
- Network: Raj TV
- Release: 29 December 2008 – 30 December 2011

Geethanjali is a soap opera that aired on Raj TV. The show stars Deepa Venkat, Nithya Ravindran, Deepak Dinkar, Rajasekar, Banumathi, Shilpa and Bharath. The serial is produced by AVM Productions and directed by A.V.M. Kumaran. The show aired Monday through Saturday at 6.30PM starting 29 December 2008, and ended on 30 December 2011 after a total of 1,078 episodes. It received top ratings and high praise from viewers.

== Cast ==
- Shilpa as Geetha
- Bharath Kalyan as Kannan
- Deepa Venkat as Madhu
- M. Bhanumathi as Geetha's Mother
- S .Rajasekar
- Vijay Adhiraj
- Deepak Dinkar as Chandru
- Gayathri
- Pooja as Thamarai
- Sumangali
- Rachitha Mahalakshmi
