= Puthiya Thalaimurai TV =

PuthiyaThalaimurai TV
- Puthiya Thalaimurai TV logo
- Country: India
- Broadcast area: India
- Network: New Gen Media Corporation
- Headquarters: Chennai, Tamil Nadu, India

Programming
- Language: Tamil
- Picture format: 576i (SD)

Ownership
- Sister channels: Puthuyugam TV; The Federal

History
- Launched: 24 August 2011

Links
- Website: www.puthiyathalaimurai.com

Puthiya Thalaimurai TV is a Tamil news channel headquartered at Chennai, Tamil Nadu, India. It is run by Chennai-based The New Generation Media Corporation, along with Puthiya Thalaimurai Magazine. The Channel is viewed channel in Tamil Nadu. The New Generation Media Group also has an English website, The Federal. The Federal is a digital platform disseminating news, analysis and commentary. It seeks to look at India from the perspective of the states.

== History ==
Puthiya Thalaimurai TV launched on 24 August 2011. It broadcasts news, discussion, documentary and infotainment programmes.

In November 2011, the channel issued a press release stating it had topped the TAM (Television Audience Measurement) ratings.

== Controversies ==
In March 2014, the Puthiya Thalaimurai office was attacked by a group of men who hurled two bombs into it. There were no casualties in the incident.

Two tiffin-box crude bombs were hurled at the office of Tamil news channel Puthiya Thalaimurai on the morning of 12 March 2015. The bombs exploded, but no one was injured nor was any property damaged. This attack was in response to the Puthiya Thalaimurai Channel that had planned to air a debate-programme on the thali or mangalsutra. The Hindu Munnani planned to protest outside the channel’s office against the programme on 8 March, following which this attack took place. Activists of the group later attacked the channel crew which was to cover the protest. Ten members of Hindu Munnani were arrested.
