= Gudu Gudu Gunjam =

- Movie Poster
- Directed by: Veeru K.
- Screenplay by: Marudhuri Raja
- Story by: Veeru K.
- Produced by: V. Ravi Kumar Reddy
- Starring: Rajendra Prasad; Sithara; Kasturi; Parthu; Chahat; Arthi Puri
- Cinematography: T. Rajendra; Madhu A Naidu
- Edited by: Nandamuri Hari
- Music by: Veeru K.
- Production company: Sri Chitra
- Release date: 27 August 2010
- Running time: 111 minutes
- Country: India
- Language: Telugu

Gudu Gudu Gunjam is 2010 Telugu-language comedy film, produced by V. Ravi Kumar Reddy on Sri Chitra banner and directed by Veeru K. Starring Rajendra Prasad, Sithara, Kasturi, Parthu, Chahat, Arthi Puri and music also composed by Veeru K. The film was recorded as a flop at the box office.

== Cast ==
- Rajendra Prasad as Gopalam
- Sithara as Seeta
- Kasturi as Malliswari
- Parthu as Parthu
- Chahat as Meenakshi
- Arthi Puri
- Rithima
- Fhara
- Suman as Venkataratnam
- Brahmanandam as Ek Niranjan
- M. S. Narayana as Rama Swamy
- Venu Madhav as Don Chary
- Kondavalasa
- Krishna Bhagavaan as Padmabhushan Paidipala
- Gundu Sudarshan as Narayana Murthy
- Jenny
- Telangana Shakuntala as Kadapa Reddamma
- Surekha Vani
- Kinnera

== Soundtrack ==
Gudu Gudu Gunjam

Film score by Veeru K
- Released: 2010
- Genre: Soundtrack
- Length: 23:00
- Label: Shivaranjani Music
- Producer: Veeru K.

Music composed by Veeru K. Music was released on Shivaranjani Music Company.

No.	Title	Lyrics	Singer(s)	Length
1.	"Mahi Mahi"	Bhaskarbhatla Ravikumar	Ravi Varma, Pranavi	4:07
2.	"Ninnila Eppudu"	Kula Shekar	Raghu, Sunitha	4:34
3.	"Raye Raye"	Bhaskarbhatla Ravikumar	Ravi Varma	3:40
4.	"Dora Vayasu Chinnadi (Remix)"	Kula Shekar	Raghu, Padmalatha	3:31
5.	"Preminchara"	Kula Shekar	Raghu, Pranavi	3:55
6.	"Jigi Bigi Chamakula"	Viswa	Viswa, Manju	3:13
Total length:				23:00
