= Vijay Adhiraj =

Indian actor

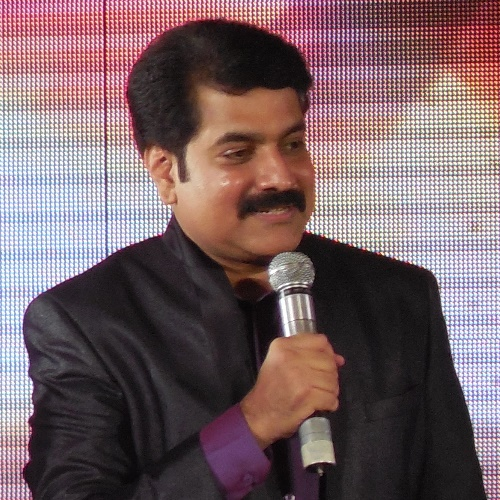
- Born: 18 April 1970 (age 56); Madras, Tamil Nadu, India
- Occupations: Actor, director, anchor
- Notable work: Suzhal, Ganesh-Vasanth, Chithi, Manaivi
- Spouse: Rashna
- Children: 2

Vijay Adhiraj is an Indian actor who has predominantly appeared in Tamil films and serials.

He also has a few credits in Telugu, Hindi, and Kannada. He was introduced in the NFDC and Doordarshan produced Sahsraphan in Hindi, written by P. V. Narasimha Rao and directed by T. S. Nagabharana.

== Career ==
Adhiraj made his acting debut starring in television serials, before featuring in films including Ponnu Veetukkaran and Roja Kootam. Throughout the 2000s, he became an established television and live event host.

Suzhal, directed by his father the late Shri Anand Mohan and written by him, launched him into the limelight. It was followed by Nimmadhi Ungal Choice, produced by AVM Productions and directed by Shri Sp. Muthuraman. Ganesh–Vasanth, written by Sujatha, produced by Madras Talkies and directed by Suhasini Manirathnam, helped establish his credentials as an actor.

Chithi, produced by Radaan Mediaworks, established him as a sought after television star, and gave him the title "Superstar" of the small screen.

He finished as runner up in the reality dance show Jodi Number One during season 1, alongside his wife, Rashna.

He has since directed a film, Puthagam, which starred Sathya, Jagapati Babu and Rakul Preet Singh. Adhiraj wrote the script in 1998, but was advised by his peers, including Crazy Mohan, to wait before launching the production. The film had a low key release in January 2013 and received average reviews from critics.

He has hosted many famous functions, including the Littleshows Award.

== Filmography ==
=== Film ===
- Note: all films are in Tamil, unless otherwise noted.

Year	Film	Role	Notes
1997	Manava 2022	Manava 2022	Kannada film
1998	Poonthottam	Suresh	
1999	Ponnu Veetukkaran	Muthu	
2002	Roja Kootam	Mano's arranged husband	
2003	Three Roses	Saleem	
2004	Vaanam Vasappadum	Aadhi Narayanan	
2014	Pattaya Kelappanum Pandiya	Saravanan	
2022	Kalaga Thalaivan	Keshav Rao	

=== Television ===
Year	Title	Role	Notes and Ref.
1995–2001	Nimathy Ungal Choice		
1996–1997	Suzhal		
1997	Aachi International	Mahesh	
1998–1999	Vazhandhu Kattugiren	Vikaram	
1999	Ganesh & Vasanth	Vasanth	
1999–2000	Oru Pennin Kathaai	Sudhakar	
2000	Gopi	Gopalan	
2000–2001	Chithi	Prasad	
2001–2004	Allai Osai		
2001	Anbulla Senagetheya		
2002-07	Avarkal		
2003	Appa		
2002–2003	Payanam	Samraj Patrika	
2000–2002	Gopuram		
2002-03	Varam		
2003–2005	Annamalai	Anwar	
2004	Anandham	Vijay	Special appearance
2004	Thadayam		
2004–2006	Manaivi	Ramani	
2003–2005	Vikramathithan		
2005-08	Aarthi	Santhosh	
2006–2008	Sharadha	Sharadhanathan	
2006-08	Lakshmi	Jeeva	
2008-10	Rekha IPS		
2008–2014	Mudha Moolu Bandham		
2008-11	Geethanjali		
2011–2012	Chellamay	Lawyer Avinash	Extended special appearance
2013–14	Chellakilli		
2014	10 Mani Kathigal		
2015–2016	Vina Vidai Vettai Juniors	Host	
2019	Gods of Dharmapuri (G.O.D)	Vengal Reddy	Telugu web series
2024	The Mystery of Moksha Island	Subbu	Telugu web series

=== As film director ===
Year	Film	Ref.
2013	Puthagam	
TBA	Nodikku Nodi †	

=== Voice artist ===
Year	Title	Notes
2000	Pandavas: The Five Warriors	Animation film; for the character Arjun
2002	Kadhal Virus	For Abbas
