= Vina Vidai Vettai Juniors season 2 =

Vina Vidai Vettai Juniors
- Season 2
- No. of episodes: 16

Release
- Original network: Puthuyugam TV
- Original release: 13 September 2015 – 3 January 2016

Vina Vidai Vettai Juniors Season 2 (Tamil: வினா விடை வேட்டை ஜூனியர்ஸ் 2) (transl. 'Question, answer, hunt') is an Indian Tamil-language quiz show broadcast on Puthuyugam TV from 13 September 2015 to 3 January 2016 aired every Sunday 12:00PM IST for 16 episode.

The quiz show for school students particularly from grades 8 to 12. The idea of this program would be to enable students to make them think beyond their text books. It is a quiz show designed to test knowledge of Indian culture, sports, politics, history and current affairs. The Show host by Vijay Adhiraj.

Chettinad Vidyashram, Chennai emerged victorious in the finale.
