= Khajuraho Dance Festival =

One-week festival of classical dances held annually in central India

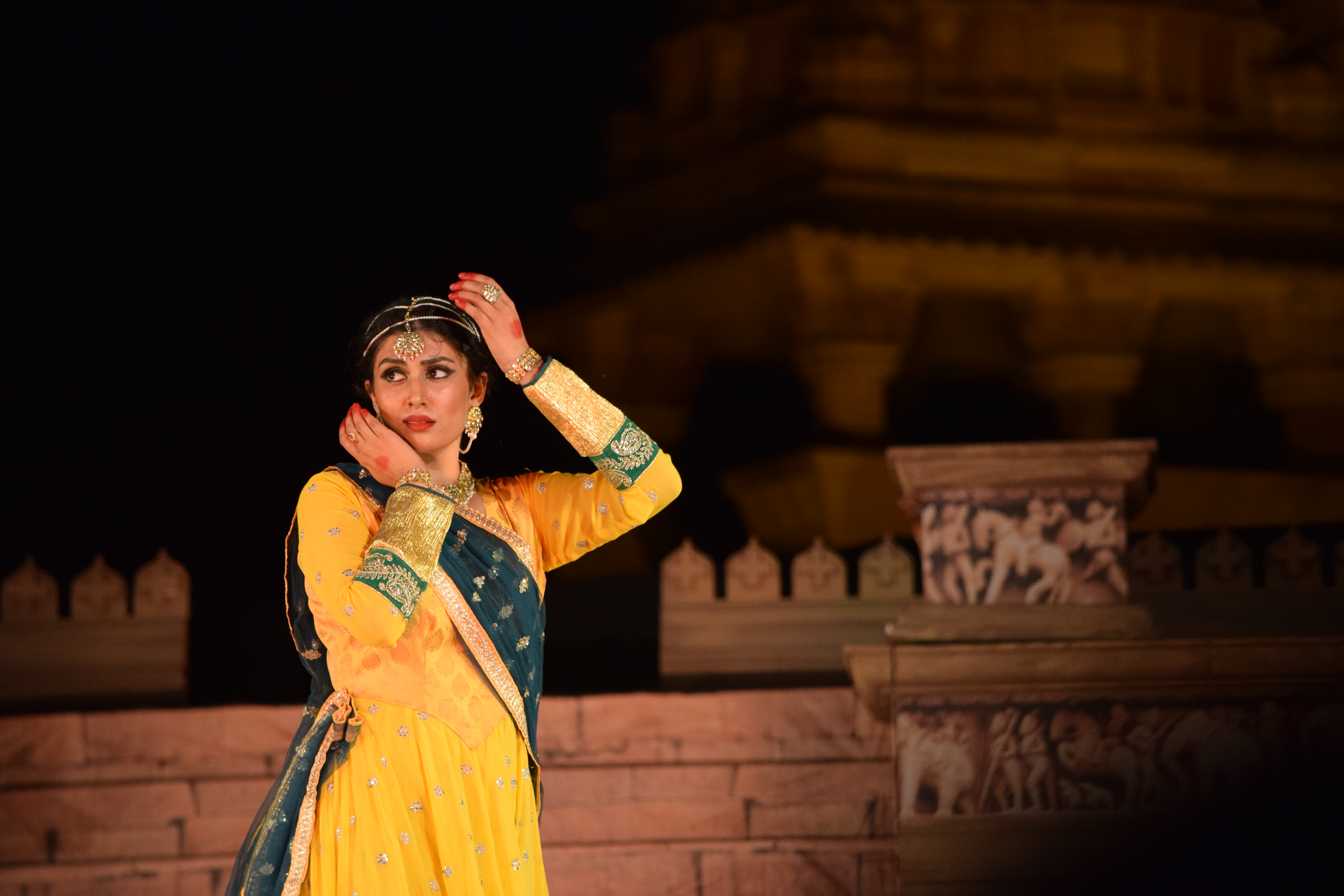
- Khajuraho Dance Festival
- Location: Khajuraho
- Coordinates: 24.854°N 79.921°E
- Country: India
- Inaugurated: 1975
- Organizer: Government of Madhya Pradesh
- Website: http://khajurahodancefestival.com/

The Khajuraho Dance Festival (IAST:Khajuraho Nritya Samaroh), organised by the Madhya Pradesh Kala Parishad, is a one-week festival of classical dances held annually beside the Khajuraho temples in Chhatarpur district of Madhya Pradesh state in central India. The festival is conducted in February from the 20th to the 26th.

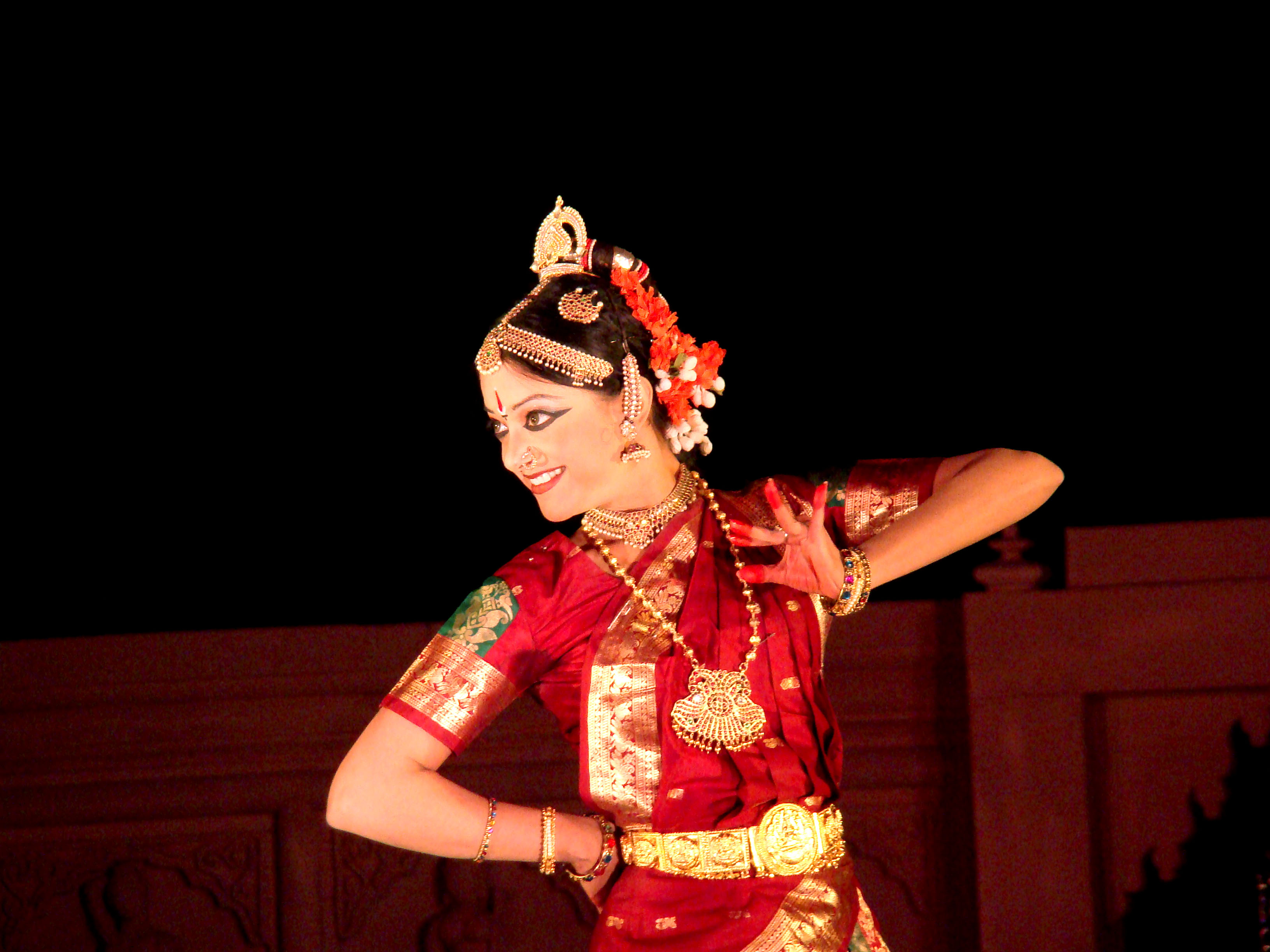
Bharatanatyam dance performance at Khajuraho festival

This festival highlights the richness of the Indian classical dance styles such as Kathak, Bharathanatyam, Odissi, Kuchipudi, Manipuri, Gaudiya Nritya, and Kathakali with performances of some of the best exponents in the field. Modern Indian dance has been added recently.

The dances are performed in an open-air auditorium, usually in front of the Chitragupta Temple dedicated to Surya (the Sun God) and the Vishvanatha Temple dedicated to Lord Shiva, belonging to the western group.

== History ==
The first edition of the festival began in 1975.

== Events ==
Apart from dance, other events include film screenings and handicraft expositions.

== See also ==
- Modhera Dance Festival
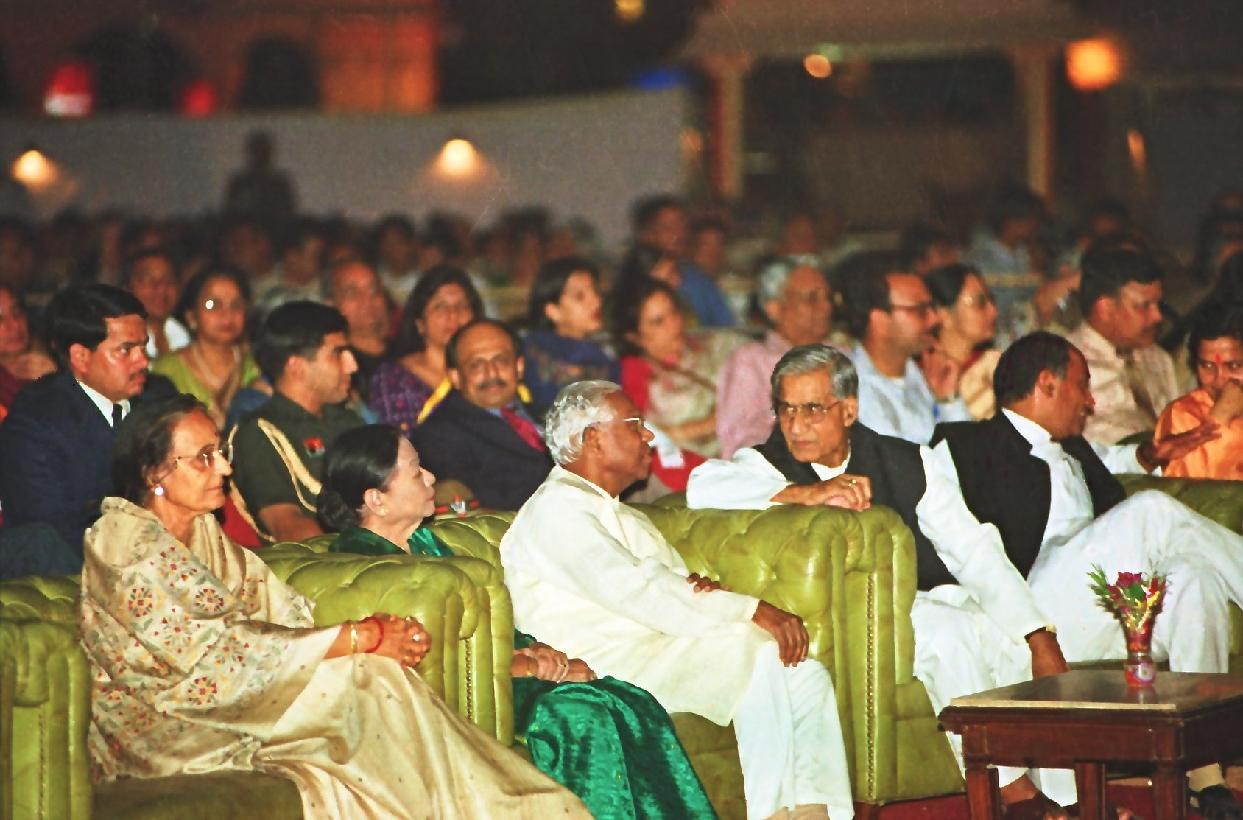
  The President of India, Shri K. R. Narayanan among the spectators at the 1999 Khajuraho Dance Festival
