= Arangetram (TV series) =

Indian Tamil-language soap opera

- Genre: Ssoap opera
- Directed by: Suresh Krissna
- Starring: Sivaranjani; Sham; AC.Murali; Vijay Pirasanth
- Original language: Tamil
- No. of seasons: 1
- No. of episodes: 91

Production
- Producer: Suresh Krissna
- Camera setup: Multi-camera
- Running time: approx. 20-22 minutes per episode
- Production company: SK Suresh Krissna

Original release
- Network: Puthuyugam TV
- Release: 26 May – 10 October 2014

Arangetram is a 2014 Indian-Tamil-language soap opera starring Sivaranjani, Sham, AC.Murali and Vijay Pirasanth. That aired on Puthuyugam TV from 26 May 2014 to 10 October 2014 on Monday through Friday at 08:00PM IST for 91 episodes.

The serial was produced and directed by the popular big screen director Suresh Krissna. The story was of a different type, when compared to many serial stories. It revolved around a young girl. She married a guy, a man of her dreams, with so much love and imagination. But destiny took a toll after the marriage. It was a disaster. She was raped by a gang of three to four rapists and was thrown away in the streets. It also aired in Malaysia Tamil Channel on Astro Vaanavil.

== Plot ==
The story was about the girl Vijayalakshmi, who was the victim. She started fighting her own battle. The society, as in many circumstances, started blaming the victim, instead of the culprits. Vijayalakshmi, with strong heart and mind dealt with the society and the court and the rest of the story detailed her struggle to get the justice.

== Cast ==
- Sivaranjani as Vijayalakshmi
- Sham
- AC.Murali
- Vijay Pirasanth
- Meenakshi
- Khirushna Kumar

== International broadcast ==
- In Malaysia Tamil Channel on Astro Vaanavil.
