= Urmila Satyanarayana =

Indian classical dancer of bharatanatyam

- Born: 8 January 1965 (age 61); Chennai, Tamil Nadu
- Origin: India
- Genres: Indian classical music
- Occupation: Bharatanatyam dancer
- Years active: 2011
- Members: Samyuktha Satyanarayana (Daughter)

Urmila Sathyanarayana (8 January 1965) is an Indian classical dancer of bharatanatyam.

== Early life and background ==
Urmila Satyanarayna has been trained under the guidance of eminent gurus ‘Padmashri’ K.N. Dandayauthapani Pillai of the Vazhuvoor bani, Kalaimamani K.J. Sarasa and Padma Bhushan Kalanidhi Narayanan. She is primarily known for her Arramandi.

== Career ==
Urmila has been a student of Bharatnatyam since the age of five and did her arrangetram at the age of ten. She has performed in venues at the national and international level, and has been the recipient of numerous awards including the Kalaimamani award of the state of Tamil Nadu and Sangeet Natak Akademi Awards (Akademi Puruskar) for the year 2023.

== Natya Sankalpa ==
Urmila started the dance school, Natya Sankalpa, in the year 1996, at Kilpauk Gardens, Chennai. The institution emphasises on the knowledge of the theory of dance, carnatic music and yoga in the formation of a Bharatanatyam artist. Among the staff are talented artists such as Kalidasan Suresh, a renowned choreographer, and one of the few artistes who can both wield the cymbals and provide vocal support simultaneously for a Bharatanatyam recital. Urmila and the school has been performing at Margazhi season in Chennai for over 40 years. Natya Sankalpa celebrated its 20th anniversary with the 100th arangetram held by the school.
