= Natchathira Jannal =

- Genre: Talk show
- Directed by: Vimalraj
- Presented by: Sangeetha Krish (Season: 1–2); Divya and Anjana Rangan (Season: 3) Priya Mahalakshmi Season 4
- Starring: Celebrities & Notable Individuals in Tamil Cinema
- Country of origin: India
- Original language: Tamil
- No. of seasons: 03
- No. of episodes: Season 1: 37 + 2 Special Episode; Season 2: 3 (Episode: 10) Season 3:

Production
- Production location: Tamil Nadu
- Camera setup: Multi-camera
- Running time: approx. 40–45 minutes per episode

Original release
- Network: Puthuyugam TV
- Release: 27 October 2013 – present

Related
- Koffee with DD; Simply Kushboo; Ninaithale Inikkum; Anbudan DD

Natchathira Jannal is an Indian Tamil language talk show on Puthuyugam TV. The first season of the show began airing on 27 October 2013, and ended on 3 August 2014, after airing 39 episodes. The second season has been started from 25 August 2017 and ended on 1 November 2017, after airing 10 episodes. The show hosted by Tamil actress Sangeetha Krish.

The third season has been started from 29 July 2018 and airs on every Sunday at 11:00 am (IST) and Hosted by Singer Divya.

== Overview ==
The show will feature personalities from the Tamil film industry (Actor, producer, Singers, television presenter, director) from Tamil Nadu who will talk about their life.

== Seasons overview ==
Season	Episodes	Originally aired		Time
Season	Episodes	First aired	Last aired	Time
1	37 + 2 Special Episode	27 October 2013	3 August 2014	Sunday; 7:00 pm (IST)
2	10	27 August 2017	1 November 2017	Sunday; 7:00 pm (IST)
3		29 July 2018		Sunday; 11:00 am (IST)

== List of Episodes ==
=== Season 01 ===
Episodes	Celebrities	Occupation	Telecast date	Time
01	Jiiva	Tamil film actor	27 October 2013	Sunday 7:00 pm (IST)
02	Venkat Prabhu	Tamil film Actor, film director, film producer, playback singer, screenwriter, lyricist	3 September 2013	Sunday 7:00 pm (IST)
03	Bala	Tamil film director, film producer, screenwriter	10 September 2013	Sunday 7:00 pm (IST)
04	Arya	Actor, film producer	17 September 2013	Sunday 7:00 pm (IST)
04	Anushka Shetty	Actress, model	17 September 2013	Sunday 7:00 pm (IST)
05	Atharvaa	Actor	24 September 2013	Sunday 7:00 pm (IST)
06	Jayam Ravi	Actor	1 December 2013	Sunday 7:00 pm (IST)
07	Vijay Sethupathi	Actor, producer, screenwriter, Playback singer, lyricist	8 December 2013	Sunday 7:00 pm (IST)
08	Vishal	Actor, producer, Secretary General for Nadigar Sangam	15 December 2013	Sunday 7:00 pm (IST)
09	Anirudh Ravichander	Film composer, music director, Singer, composer, arranger, Instrumentalist, actor, Vocalist, Pianist, Conductor	22 December 2013	Sunday 7:00 pm (IST)
10	Natchathira Jannal Special		29 December 2013	Sunday 7:00 pm (IST)
11	Vikram Prabhu	Actor	5 January 2014	Sunday 7:00 pm (IST)
12	Sona Heiden	Actress, producer	12 January 2014	Sunday 7:00 pm (IST)
12	Anuradha	Actress	12 January 2014	Sunday 7:00 pm (IST)
13	Devi Sri Prasad	Music, composer, singer, lyricist, director	19 January 2014	Sunday 7:00 pm (IST)
14	Vetrimaaran	Tamil film director, film producer, writer	26 January 2014	Sunday 7:00 pm (IST)
15	Arulnithi	Tamil film Actor	2 February 2014	Sunday 7:00 pm (IST)
16	Gangai Amaran	Tamil film Actor, director, producer, screenwriter, Film score composer, lyricist, music director, songwriter, singer, conductor, instrumentalist	9 February 2014	Sunday 7:00 pm (IST)
17	Udhayanidhi Stalin	Film producer, actor	16 February 2014	Sunday 7:00 pm (IST)
17	Kiruthiga Udhayanidhi		16 February 2014	Sunday 7:00 pm (IST)
18	Shaam	Film actor, model	23 February 2014	Sunday 7:00 pm (IST)
19	Vedhika	Actress, model	2 March 2014	Sunday 7:00 pm (IST)
20	Silambarasan	Film actor, film director, screenwriter, playback singer, lyricist, voice actor, music composer	9 March 2014	Sunday 7:00 pm (IST)
21	Sivakarthikeyan	Film actor, dancer, television presenter, singer	16 March 2014	Sunday 7:00 pm (IST)
22	Shanthanu Bhagyaraj	Actor	23 March 2014	Sunday 7:00 pm (IST)
23	Varalaxmi Sarathkumar	Actress	30 March 2014	Sunday 7:00 pm (IST)
24	G. V. Prakash Kumar	soundtrack composer, actor, singer	6 April 2014	Sunday 7:00 pm (IST)
25	Chimbu Deven	director, screenwriter	21 April 2014	Sunday 7:00 pm (IST)
26	Vijay Vasanth	Actor	27 April 2014	Sunday 7:00 pm (IST)
27	Krishna	Actor	4 Mai 2014	Sunday 7:00 pm (IST)
27	Rupa Manjari	Actress	4 Mai 2014	Sunday 7:00 pm (IST)
28	M. Sasikumar	Actor, director, producer, distributor	18 Mai 2014	Sunday 7:00 pm (IST)
29	Siddharth	Film actor, film producer, playback singer	25 Mai 2014	Sunday 7:00 pm (IST)
30	Ram	Film director	1 June 2014	Sunday 7:00 pm (IST)
31	N. Lingusamy	Film director, producer, screenwriter	8 June 2014	Sunday 7:00 pm (IST)
32	Khushbu	Actress, producer, and television presenter	15 June 2014	Sunday 7:00 pm (IST)
33	Vishnu Vishal	Actor, Cricketer, producer	22 June 2014	Sunday 7:00 pm (IST)
34	Vivek	Actor, comedian	29 June 2014	Sunday 7:00 pm (IST)
35	Nakul	Film actor, playback singer	6 July 2014	Sunday 7:00 pm (IST)
36	Priya Anand	Actress	13 July 2014	Sunday 7:00 pm (IST)
37	Nachathira Jannal Special		20 July 2014	Sunday 7:00 pm (IST)
38	Radhika	Actress, producer, entrepreneur	27 July 2014	Sunday 7:00 pm (IST)
39	R. Parthiepan	Actor, director, producer, writer	3 August 2014	Sunday 7:00 pm (IST)

=== Season 02 ===
Episodes	Celebrities	Occupation	Telecast date	Time
01	Jiiva	Tamil film actor	27 August 2017	Sunday at 7:00 pm (IST)
02	Akshara Haasan	Actress	3 September 2017	Sunday at 7:00 pm (IST)
03	Vishnu Vishal	Actor, Cricketer, producer	10 September 2017	Sunday at 7:00 pm (IST)
03	Catherine Tresa	Actress	10 September 2017	Sunday at 7:00 pm (IST)
03	Tha. Muruganantham	Director, writer	10 September 2017	Sunday at 7:00 pm (IST)
04	Pushkar–Gayathri	Director	17 September 2017	Sunday at 7:00 pm (IST)
05	Aishwarya Rajesh	Actress	24 September 2017	Sunday at 7:00 pm (IST)
06	Gautham Karthik	Actor	1 October 2017	Sunday at 7:00 pm (IST)
07	Mysskin	Film director, actor	14 October 2017	Sunday at 7:00 pm (IST)
08	Mysskin	Film director, actor	21 October 2017	
09	Nikki Galrani	Actress	29 October 2017	
10	Nandita Swetha	Actress	4 November 2017	

=== Season 03 ===
Episodes	Celebrities	Occupation	Telecast date	Time
01	Vijay Sethupathi	Tamil film actor	29 July 2018	Sunday at 11:00 am (IST)
01	Gokul	film director	29 July 2018	Sunday at 11:00 am (IST)
01	Siddharth Vipin	Film score, Soundtrack	29 July 2018	Sunday at 11:00 am (IST)
02	Arya	Tamil film actor	5 August 2018	Sunday at 11:00 am (IST)
02	Sayyeshaa Saigal	Actress	5 August 2018	Sunday at 11:00 am (IST)
02	Sathish	Comedy Actor	5 August 2018	Sunday at 11:00 am (IST)
02	Santhosh P. Jayakumar	film director	5 August 2018	Sunday at 11:00 am (IST)
03	Sathish	Comedy Actor	12 August 2018	Sunday at 11:00 am (IST)
04	Pooja Kumar	Actress	19 August 2018	Sunday at 11:00 am (IST)
05	P. Vijay	Poet, lyricist, writer, actor, director	26 August 2018	Sunday at 11:00 am (IST)
