= Arangetram (2023 film) =

- Theatrical release poster
- Directed by: Srinivaas Praban
- Written by: Srinivaas Praban
- Produced by: Maheshwari; Vijayalakshmi
- Starring: Srinivas Prabhu; Mustafa Askari; Roshan; Saishri; Pooja Bora
- Cinematography: Buran Shaik (Saleem)
- Edited by: Madhu
- Music by: Gidiyan Katta
- Production company: Mahi Media Works
- Release date: 5 May 2023
- Country: India
- Language: Telugu

Arangetram (transl. Debut performance) is a 2023 Indian Telugu-language crime thriller film directed by Srinivaas Praban, who previously directed Kavacham (2018). The film stars himself, Mustafa Askari, Roshan, Saishri and Pooja Bora. It was released on 5 May 2023.

== Cast ==
- Srinivaas Praban as Prabhan
- Mustafa Askari
- Roshan
- Saishri
- Pooja Reddy Bora as Meghna
- Anirudh T
- Laya
- Indhu
- Srivalli
- Vijaya
- Sai Sree
- Jabardasth Sathipandu
- Kotesh Manava as Police Inspector

== Reception ==
A critic from The Pioneer rated the film two-and-a-half out of five stars and wrote that "With many gripping elements, an emotional backdrop, and stellar performances and narration, Arangetram impresses the audience. Watch the movie if you like crime thrillers". A critic from The Hans India rated the film two out of five stars and wrote that "On a whole, Arangetram movie is an engaging psycho crime thriller". A critic from Sakshi rated the film two-and-a-half out of five stars and wrote that if one writes a story with a gripping screenplay, they can impress everyone. The director has also tried the same for his debut film. He succeeded in his attempt. Here the hero is the director but excels in both places. A critic from NTV rated the film two-and-a-half out of five and wrote that those who like thriller genres have a chance to like it if they watch Arangetram without any expectations.
