= Puthuyugam TV =

Indian Tamil-language television channel

- Country: India
- Broadcast area: India
- Network: New Era Media Corporation Chennai Pvt Ltd
- Headquarters: Chennai, Tamil Nadu, India

Programming
- Language(s): Tamil
- Picture format: 576i (SD)

Ownership
- Owner: SRM Group
- Sister channels: Puthiya Thalaimurai TV; Vendhar TV

History
- Launched: 23 October 2013

Links
- Website: www.puthuyugam.tv

Puthuyugam TV is an Indian Tamil-language general entertainment channel based in Chennai, India. It complements its sister channel Puthiya Thalaimurai TV, which was launched on 23 October 2013. It is run by Chennai-based The New Era Media Corporation Chennai Pvt. Ltd., along with Puthiya Thalaimurai magazine. It is owned by the SRM Group of Companies.

== See also ==
- Natchathira Jannal
