= Devathaiyai Kanden (TV series) =

Indian Tamil-language soap opera

- Genre: Soap opera
- Written by: Zee Tamizh Programming Team; Dialogues by Selva Vadivel
- Screenplay by: A.K.Pandiyan
- Directed by: Rathinam Vasudevan (200- to end)
- Creative director: A.Abdullah
- Starring: Ishwar; Krithika; Mahalakshmi; Sulakshana; Deepa Sree
- Country of origin: India
- Original language: Tamil
- No. of episodes: 593

Production
- Producers: Ajisha Abdulla; Arman Abdulla
- Cinematography: S.Gunasekaran
- Editor: G. Parandhaman C.Vasanthakumar
- Camera setup: Multi-camera
- Running time: 22 minutes
- Production company: Abdullah Productions

Original release
- Network: Zee Tamil
- Release: 9 October 2017 – 21 February 2020

Devathayai Kanden (transl. I saw an angel) is an Indian Tamil-language soap opera starring Ishwar, Krithika Laddu, Mahalakshmi . It started airing on Zee Tamil on 9 October 2017. The plot of the series is taken from a Telugu television series called Rama Seetha which aired on Zee Telugu from 2014 to 2017.

== Plot ==
'Devathaiyai Kanden' is a Psychological thriller story that revolves around two protagonists - Vasudevan (Shreekumar/Ishwar) and Lakshmi (Shyamili Nayar/Krithika Laddu) with completely different mindset. Vasudevan is bought up by his grandfather who is a retired military major and is bound to follow very strict rules and regulations put forward by his grandfather (G. M. Kumar) due to various reasons. Lakshmi on the other hand is an independent lady who marries Vasudevan and wishes that her husband should love her the most than anyone else in this world. Knowing her wish Vasudevan gives her special love and affection. But his love slowly turns out to be a possessiveness without his own knowledge and it becomes grudgingly worrisome. At some point Lakshmi wishes that no woman should get such a husband and leaves him. How Lakshmi gets along with Vasudevan and over comes him and how Vasudevan's nature is changed forms the crux of the story.

== Cast ==
=== Main ===
- Eshwar Raghunathan as Vasudevan
- Krithika Laddu as Lakshmi and Nallamma
- Mahalakshmi as Pavithra Kamini

=== Recurring ===
- Sulakshana as Meenatchi (Vasudevan's mother)
- Rishi Keshav as Thennarasu (Pavithra's brother)
- Deepa Sree as Bharathi (Pavithra's worker)
- Sharanya as Kaviya (Vasudevan's sister)
- Subageetha as Sevappi (Nallamma's sister)
- Anusai Elakiya as Nila (Thennarasu assistant)
- Hema Chinraj as Sivagami (A goddess)
- Shyamili Nayar as Lakshmi and Nallamma (Replaced by Krithika)
- Shreekumar as Vasudevan (Replaced by Eshwar)
- Sheela as Meenatchi (Replaced by Sulakshana)
- Ravi Varma as Lakshmi's father
- Bharatha Naidu as Oviya (Vasudevan sister)
- Maanas Chaavili as Raguram
- Vigneshwara Naidu as Vicky
- Ravi as Velu
- Rehana as Rani
- Mani as Selvam
- Kiruthika as Kirthi
- Navin as Rajesh

=== Special appearance ===
- G. M. Kumar as Vasudevan's grandfather

== Production ==
=== Casting ===
The series is a psychological thriller love story. Shreekumar, formerly of the series Naanal, Uravugal, Bommalattam, Anandham, Idhayam, Thayumanavan, Pillai Nila, Megala, Sivasakthi, Thalayanai Pookal and Yaaradi Nee Mohini, plays the lead male role of Vasudevan, Later Ishwar, formerly of the series Kalyana Parisu, Kalyanam Mudhal Kadhal Varai, Raja Rani and Gopurangal Saivathilai, was replaced the role of Vasudevan and Mahalakshmi, formerly of the series Bhairavi Aavigalukku Priyamanaval, Vani Rani, Chithi - 2, Ponnukku Thanga Manasu, Chellamey, Annakodiyum Aindhu Pengalum and Office, Plays the lead female negative role and Shyamili Nayar, formerly of the serial Keladi Kanmani, Plays the female role of Lakshmi, Later Krithika Laddu, formerly of the series Poove Poochudava, Chandralekha, Ponnunjal and Hello Shyamala, was replaced the role of Lakshmi and Avan Ivan Tamil Film Fame G. M. Kumar was selected to portray the Special appearance of Vasdevan`s grandfather.

=== Reception ===
- Writer: A.K. Pandiyan
- Dialogues: Selva Vadivelu
- Director: Rathinam Vasudevan
- Editor: G. Parandhaman C.Vasanthakumar
- Co-Director: Rajkumar Nadarajan
- Assiant Director: Seenu, Navi Muthaiya
- Soundtrack: Arul
- Creative director: Abdulla

== Awards and nominations ==
| Year | Award | Category | Recipient | Result |
|---|---|---|---|---|
| 2018 | 1st Zee Tamil Kudumbam Viruthugal | Most Promising Actor Female | Shamili Nayer | Nominated |
| 2018 | 1st Zee Tamil Kudumbam Viruthugal | Most Popular Marumagal | Shamili Nayer | Nominated |
| 2018 | 1st Zee Tamil Kudumbam Viruthugal | Most Popular Mamiyar | Sulakshana | Nominated |
| 2018 | 1st Zee Tamil Kudumbam Viruthugal | Best Villi | Mahalakshmi | Nominated |
