= Shreekumar =

Indian Tamil television actor (born 1975)

- Born: Shreekumar Velumani Ganesh
- Occupations: Television actor, Actor, Digital Creator
- Years active: 2001–present
- Known for: Zee Tamil, Sun TV, Star Vijay, Jaya TV, Raj TV, SathiyamTV
- Spouse(s): Shamitha (m.2009–present)
- Children: 1
- Relatives: Shankar–Ganesh (Father); G. N. Velumani (Grandfather)

YouTube information
- Channel: ConnectWithSree

Shreekumar Ganesh is an Indian actor. He is best known for appearing in Tamil Television Serials such as Anandham (2003–2009), Ahalya (2004–2006), Malargal (2005–2007), Bhantham (2006–2009), Idhayam (2009–2012) and Bommalattam (2012–2016) on Sun TV. He is noted for his leading roles in Sivasakthi (2008–2009), Naanal (2008–2009), Uravugal (2009–2012), Pillai Nila (2012–2014), Thalayanai Pookal (2016–2018), Devathayai Kanden (2017–2018) and Yaardai Nee Mohini (2018–2021). Shreekumar has also appeared in a number of Tamil films.

== Personal life ==
Shreekumar Ganesh is the son of popular music director Ganesh, known for being part of the duo Shankar–Ganesh. His mother was a daughter of G.N.Velumani, a renowned Tamil movie producer in later 1950s to 1960s. Shreekumar Ganesh is a close friend of Chief Minister of Tamil Nadu C. Joseph Vijay and Television Serial Actors Sanjeev Venkat and Deepak Dinkar. Shreekumar Ganesh and his co-star Shamitha Shreekumar got married in 2009 and they both have a daughter named Rayna Shreekumar.

== Career ==
Shreekumar Ganesh started auditioning and landed supporting comic roles in several Tamil Films such as Bambara Kannaley and television series such as Ahalya (2004–2006), Bhandham (2006–2009), Megala (2007–2010), Sivasakthi (2008–2009) and Rudhra (2008–2009). He starred with Famous Actress Khushbu in the show. He became famous after the serial Sivasakthi where he acted as the son of Renuka / Sabitha Anand. In 2008, he starred in his first leading role in Kalaignar as Naanal serial and starred with Tamil Film actress Sonia Agarwal in the show. It was written and produced by Khushbu. He did another Supporting Character in Sathileelavathi Serial. It was a popular Serial in Kalaignar.

In 2009, Shreekumar Ganesh starred as brief role for nine episode in Sun TV Family serial Uravugal (2009–2012). The same year, he was cast in Sun TV Family Medical serial Idhayam (2009–2012) alongside Seetha, Nithya Das and Sanjeev Venkat. The series was a Super hit success.

In 2012, he played the young father character in Sun TV family serial Pillai Nila (2012–2014) alongside Divya Padmini, Shamitha and Shyam Ganesh. Shree and Shamitha shared the screen space together after marriage. The same year, he was cast in Zee Tamil Romance and Family serial Thulasi (2012–2013) alongside Chandra Lakshman and Sanjeev Venkat. The same year, Shree co-starred alongside Sreeja and Delhi Kumar in Bommalattam (2012–2016), a family serial, where Shree portrayed a negative role with negative shades. It was a successful serial in Sun TV.

In 2013, he played the police officer character in Star Vijay family and romance serial Thayumanavan (2013) alongside Kalyani.

In 2016 he played the brief police inspector character in Vijay 59th action thriller film Theri written and directed by Atlee and produced by Kalaipuli S. Thanu. Shree starred in Zee Tamil family serial Thalayanai Pookal (2016–2018) alongside Nisha Krishnan and Anjali Rao.

After 2016, Shreekumar Ganesh continued his career strongly in both Tamil television drama and Cinema. Soon after Theri, he starred as the lead character Nagarajan in the Zee Tamil serial Thalayanai Pookal (2016–2018), which established him in a fresh generation of serials. Following that, he joined Devathaiyai Kanden (2017–2018) as Vasudevan, but he later exited the show before its conclusion. He then gained widespread recognition for his long-running role as Mutharasan (also called Muthu) in the supernatural thriller Yaaradi Nee Mohini (2017–2021) on Zee Tamil, which crossed over 1200 episodes. During this period, he made several special appearances in other serials, including episodes of Poove Poochudava, Mullum Malarum, Nachiyarpuram, and guest spots in shows like Sathya, Gokulathil Seethai, Oru Oorla Oru Rajakumari, Sembaruthi, and Thirumathi Hitler, often reprising his popular character or appearing in Cameo appearance. Alongside television, Shreekumar Ganesh appeared in films throughout these years; after Theri, he played Kesavan in Rangoon (2017), Bharani in RK Nagar (2019), a segment role in the anthology Kasada Tabara (2021), a Black Squad member in the Blockbuster Film Vikram (2022), and He Played a Lead role in Eedattam (2022) Film. He also portrayed Sepoy Michael in the biographical war film Amaran (2024) alongside Sivakarthikeyan.

From 2021, he portrayed Chinrasu in the Sun TV family drama serial Vanathai Pola, remaining with the show until it ended in 2024.

After the conclusion of Vanathai Pola, he made Cameo or Extendend Cameo appearance in several television serials, including the Telugu Television serial Mukkupudaka on Zee Telugu, the Tamil serial Ninaithale Inikkum on Zee Tamil, and Dhanam on Star Vijay.

In November 2025, he joined the Zee Tamil serial Gettimelam as Vetrivel (Vetri), replacing actor Sibbu Suryan in the male lead role, where he continues to act as of 2026. He later made a cameo appearance in the Zee Tamil serial Varisu, reprising his role as Vetri from Gettimelam.

In January 2026, Shreekumar Ganesh announced on his Instagram page that He is part of the Upcoming Tamil horror film Demonte Colony 3. He also played in the Zee Tamil serial Gettimelam as Vetrivel (Vetri).

== Television ==
Year	Title	Role	Channel
2001	Soolam		Sun TV
2001–2002	Kelunga Mamiyare Neengalum Marumagal Than	Sreekanth	Sun TV
2003–2004	Kavyanjali		Star Vijay
2004–2006	Kanmani		Star Vijay
2004–2006	Ahalya	Sundar	Sun TV
2006–2009	Anandham	Raja Priyan "Raja / Priyan"	Sun TV
2006–2007	Malargal	Ashok	Sun TV
2006–2009	Bhantham	Anand	Sun TV
2006	Viswaroopam (Karma)	Rajesh	Raj TV
2007	Naanayam II		Sun TV
2007–2010	Megala	Diwakar "Diwa"	Sun TV
2007	Aaru Maname Aaru		Raj TV
2008–2009	Sivasakthi	Kannan	Sun TV
2008–2009	Naanal	Rajesh	Kalaignar TV
2008–2009	Sathileelavathi		Kalaignar TV
2009–2010	Rudhra	Bala	Zee Tamil
2009–2012	Uravugal	Krishnan Annamalai	Sun TV
2009–2012	Idhayam	Shankar	Sun TV
2009	Kana Kaanum Kaalangal	Special Appearance	Star Vijay
2009	Alaippayuthe	Ganesh	Jaya TV
2011–2013	Thulasi	Selvaraghavan "Selva"	Zee Tamil
2012–2014	Pillai Nila	Sekhar	Sun TV
2012–2016	Bommalattam	Santhosh	Sun TV
2014	Thayumanavan	Shree Kumar "Shree"	Star Vijay
2015	Bhairavi	Special Appearance	Sun TV
2016–2018	Thalayanai Pookal	Naga Rajan / S.Velraj	Zee Tamil
2017	Poove Poochudava	Special Appearance	Zee Tamil
2017–2018	Devathayai Kanden	Vasudevan "Vasu"	Zee Tamil
2018–2021	Yaaradi Nee Mohini	Mutharasan "Muthu"	Zee Tamil
2018	Mullum Malarum	Mutharasan "Muthu" (special appearance)	Zee Tamil
2019	Nachiyarpuram	Mutharasan "Muthu" (special appearance)	Zee Tamil
2020	Sathya	Annamalai IPS / Kaali (special appearance)	Zee Tamil
2020 & 2021	Gokulathil Seethai	Mutharasan "Muthu" (special appearance)	Zee Tamil
2021	Ooru Oorla Oru Rajakumari	Mutharasan "Muthu" (special appearance)	Zee Tamil
2021	Sembaruthi	Karnan (special appearance)	Zee Tamil
2021	Thirumathi Hitler	Manohar (special appearance)	Zee Tamil
2021	Oru Oorla Oru Rajakumari	Mutharasan (special appearance)	Zee Tamil
2021–2024	Vanathai Pola	Chinrasu	Sun TV
2022	Mukkupudaka	IAS Suresh Babu (special appearance)	Zee Telugu
2024	Ninaithale Inikkum	Kaalabairavar (special appearance)	Zee Tamil
2025	Dhanam	Ganesha Moorthy (extended special appearance)	Star Vijay
2025–2026	Gettimelam	Vetrivel	Zee Tamil
2025	Varisu	Vetrivel (special appearance)	Zee Tamil
2026	Veera	Vetrivel (special appearance)	Zee Tamil

=== Telefilms ===
Year	Title	Role	Channel
2015	J	James "J"	Sathiyam TV

=== Reality shows/live shows ===
Year	Title	Role	Channel
2007	Jodi Number One S2	Contestant	Vijay TV
2007	Maanada Mayilada	Himself (Guest, Episode: 5)	Kalaignar
2009	Boys vs Girls	Supporting Contestant	Vijay TV
2009	Namma Veetu Kalyanam	Guest	Vijay TV
2015	South Indian Cinematographers Association Awards	Anchor	Sun TV
2017	Nanbenda	Guest	Zee Thamizh
2017	En Autograph	Guest	Zee Thamizh
2017	Zee Dance League	Contestant	Zee Thamizh
2022	Vanathai Pola Kondattam	Himself	Sun TV
2022	Super Samyal	Contestant	Sun TV

== Filmography ==
Year	Title	Role	Notes
2005	Chinna	Soosai	
2005	Bambara Kannaley	Gunasekar	
2008	Saroja	Himself	Special Appearance in song "Aaja Meri Soniye"
2010	Magane En Marumagane	Himself	Special Appearance in song "Singampatti"
2016	Theri	Shreekumar	
2017	Rangoon	Kesavan	
2019	RK Nagar	Bharani	
2021	Kasada Thapara	An Unnamed Villain's Son	Streaming release
2022	Vikram	Member of the Black Squad	
2024	Amaran	Sepoy Michael	
2025	Kadaisi Thotta	Rakshan	
2026	Demonte Colony 3	TBA	Post production

== Awards and honours ==
Year	Awards	Category	Series	Role	Result	Notes
2009	Tamil Nadu State Television Awards	Best Actor	Uravugal, Sivasakthi	Krishna, Kannan (Left)	Won
2010	Sun Kudumbam Viruthugal	Best Brother	Sivasakthi	Kannan (Left)	Won
2012	Sun Kudumbam Viruthugal	Best Actor	Bommalattam	Santhosh	Nominated
2012	Sun Kudumbam Viruthugal	Best Supporting Actor	Pillai Nila	Sekhar	Nominated
2012	Sun Kudumbam Viruthugal	Best Jodi	Pillai Nila	Sekhar & Hema	Nominated	Nominated with Divya Padmini
2012	Sun Kudumbam Viruthugal	Best Son-in-Law	Pillai Nila	Sekhar	Nominated
2014	Sun Kudumbam Viruthugal	Best Actor	Bommalattam	Santhosh	Nominated
2014	Sun Kudumbam Viruthugal	Best Jodi	Bommalattam	Santhosh & Bharathi	Nominated	Nominated with Sirija
2015	Southern India Cinematographer's Association Awards	Best Actor	Bommalattam	Santhosh	Won
2018	Zee Tamil Kudumbam Viruthugal	Best Actor Male	Yaaradi Nee Mohini	Mutharasan	Won
2018	Zee Tamil Kudumbam Viruthugal	Favourite Hero	Yaaradi Nee Mohini	Mutharasan	Nominated
2018	Zee Tamil Kudumbam Viruthugal	Favourite Pair On-Screen	Thalayanai Pookal	Nagarajan & Vethavalli	Nominated	Nominated with Anjali Rao
2019	Zee Tamil Kudumbam Viruthugal	Best Actor	Yaaradi Nee Mohini	Mutharasan	Nominated
2022	Sun Kudumbam Viruthugal	Best Brother	Vanathai Pola	Chinrasu	Won
2023	Sun Kudumbam Viruthugal	Best Brother	Vanathai Pola	Chinrasu	Won
