= Bhantham =

Indian Tamil-language soap opera

- Genre: Soap opera
- Screenplay by: J. Ramesh; S. Kumaresan; Dialogues: Balamurali Varman; S. Kumaresan
- Story by: Ramani Chandran; S. Kumaresan
- Directed by: M. K. Eeswara Moorthy; K. Rangaraj; Hari Babu
- Starring: Preethi Sanjeev; Deepak Dinkar; Kanya Bharathi; Shanthi Williams; Nalini; Sreekumar; Poovilangu Mohan; Rajasekhar; Devipriya; Balaji; Manohar; Shilpa Mary Teresa
- Theme music composer: D. Imman
- Opening theme: "Bhantham Bhantham Bhantham Illaiyel" (Vocals); Harish Raghavendra (Lyrics); Vairamuthu
- Composer: Rehan
- Country of origin: India
- Original language: Tamil
- No. of episodes: 676

Production
- Producer: San Media
- Cinematography: K. S. Nagaraj; R. V. Pazhani; C. Thandapani
- Editor: Rama Thirunavukkarasu
- Camera setup: Multi-camera
- Running time: approx. 14–24 minutes
- Production company: San Media Limited

Original release
- Network: Sun TV
- Release: 25 September 2006 – 29 May 2009

Related
- Agalya; Uravugal; Bommalattam

Bhantham (Tamil: பந்தம், transl. Bond) was an Indian Tamil-language soap opera which aired on Sun TV. It is a non-prime time serial that aired weekdays from September 25, 2006 to May 29, 2009. The show aired on Sun TV every Monday to Friday at 11:30am.

The shows stars included Preethi Sanjeev, Rindhya, Deepak Dinkar, Kanya Bharathi, Shanthi Williams, Nalini, Sreekumar, Absar, Poovilangu Mohan, Rajasekhar, Devipriya, Shilpa Mary Teresa, Balaji, Manohar, Jayanth, Venkat, Dev Anand & Yuvasri.

The show is produced by San Media Limited & directed by M. K. Eeswara Moorthy, K. Rangaraj & Hari Babu. The show was later replaced by Uravugal which was also produced by San Media.

== Plot ==
Story is revolving around 2 identical sisters Nithila & Jeeva (both played by Preethi Sanjeev/Rindhya) who fights with each other for entrenching their rights over their late father Thillainayagam's (Poovilangu Mohan) property which was cunningly grabbed by Aadhilakshmi (Nalini) who has grudge over their father & mother Thamirabharani (Kanya Bharathi/Shanthi Williams) who was Aadhi's childhood friend. Nithila supports Aadhi believing their mother had murdered their father, while Jeeva tries to retrieve the property from Aadhi & also tries to prove that she was the one who had murdered their father to seek vengeance along with proving the innocence of their mother who got falsely accused for their father's murder.

== Cast ==
- Preethi Sanjeev/Rindhya as Nithila (Gowri) & Jeeva
- Deepak Dinkar as Selva Ganapathy "Selvam/Selva"
- Kanya Bharathi/Shanthi Williams as Thamirabharani "Thamira"
- Nalini as Aadhilakshmi "Aadhi"
- Shreekumar as "Anand"
- Absar as "Shakthi"
- Poovilangu Mohan as Thillainayagam
- Rajasekhar as Sundara Ganapathy
- Devipriya as Neelambari
- Shilpa Mary Teresa as Lalitha
- Balaji/Manohar as Shantha Ganapathy "Shantha"
- Jayanth as Sathish
- Venkat as Surya
- Dev Anand as Prabhakar
- Yuvasri as Gayathri
- Yogini
- Shilpa
- Aishwarya
- Jyothi
- Neepa as Mahila
- Mali
- B. Murali as Michael
- Saval Raman
- Sukran
- M. R. Krishnamurthy as Aadiyapatham
- Vasu Vikram
- Gowthami Vembunathan
- Padmini as Anand's aunt
- Akila

== Soundtrack ==
The title song was composed by D. Imman, while the background score & the other songs were composed by Rehan. Lyrics were written by Vairamuthu.

Track list
No.	Title	Lyrics	Music	Singer(s)	Length
1.	"Bhantham Bhantham Bhantham Illaiyel பந்தம் பந்தம் பந்தம் இல்லையேல்"	Vairamuthu	D. Imman	Harish Raghavendra	4:11
2.	"Thayumanavane Thayumanavane தாயுமானவனே தாயுமானவனே"	Vairamuthu	Rehan		1:11

== Awards ==
Year	Award	Category	Recipient	Role	Result
2007	Tamil Nadu State Television	Best Villain	Nalini	Aadhilakshmi	Won
