= Malargal =

Indian Tamil-language soap opera

- Genre: Soap opera
- Screenplay by: Badri; C. U. Muthuselvan; Dialogues: K. N. Natarajan
- Story by: G. Suraaj
- Directed by: Badri; E. Vikkiramathithan
- Starring: Delhi Kumar; Chetan; Abishek Shankar; Rajkanth; Sulakshana; Meenakumari; Sabitha Anand; Azhagu
- Theme music composer: Vijay Antony
- Opening theme: "Arisi Mavale Kolam Podu" (Vocals); Rahul Nambiar; G. Gayathri Devi; Master Sooraj; Babay Shruthi Harini (Lyrics); Palani Bharathi
- Composer: Sanjeev Ratheen
- Country of origin: India
- Original language: Tamil
- No. of episodes: 400

Production
- Producer: Metti Oli S. Siddique
- Cinematography: S. T. Maads
- Editor: Singai V. Raju
- Camera setup: Multi-camera
- Running time: approx. 14–24 minutes
- Production company: Cine Times Entertainment

Original release
- Network: Sun TV
- Release: 17 October 2005 – 1 June 2007

Related
- Megala

Malargal (Tamil: மலர்கள், transl. Flowers) was an Indian Tamil-language soap opera which aired on Sun TV. It is a prime-time serial that aired weekdays from 17 October 2005 to 1 June 2007. The show aired in Sun TV every Monday to Friday at 7.30 pm.

The show starred Delhi Kumar, Chetan, Abishek Shankar, Rajkanth, Sulakshana, Meenakumari, Sabitha Anand, Azhagu, Deepak Dinkar, Sreekumar, Vaishnavi, Sri Vidya, Rindhiya, Deepa Shankar, Poovilangu Mohan, Shyam Ganesh, George Vishnu, Sureshwar, Nithya Ravindar, Sonia Bose, Sneha Eswar, Vasu Vikram, Dev Anand, Jayashree, Chithra, Kaveri, Aishwarya, Akhila, Srilekha Rajendran, Revathi Shankar, Vijay Krishnaraj, Kaveri Babu, Chandrabose, K. S. G. Venkatesh, V. C. Jeyamani, K. S. Jayalakshmi, Gauthami Vembunathan, Swetha Bharathi, Bhuvana, Hema, Vatsala Rajagopal, Karna, Rajkumar & Arun Prabu Purushothaman.

The show is produced by Cine Times Entertainment & directed by Badri & E. Vikkiramathithan. The show was later replaced by Megala which was also produced by Cine Times Entertainment.

== Plot ==
The story evolves on the life of Nataraja Gounder along with wife Sivagami & his five children Thulasi, Moorthy, Bhaskar, Siva & Vidya. Nataraja Goundar is a kind hearted, respected farmer & meticulous family leader yet he is very compassionate father. It shows how he faces struggles & hardship in his as well as his children's lives in the form of fate & enmity with Kathirvel, Gnanavel & Pandithurai who holds grudge on Nataraja Goundar for various reasons & how he overcomes it.

== Cast ==
- Delhi Kumar as Nataraja Goundar
  - B. Murali as Young Nataraja Goundar
- Chetan as Kathirvel Goundar, Nataraja Goundar & Sivagami's foster son & Ganthimathi's biological son
- Abishek Shankar as Shanmugham, Nataraja Goundar & Sivagami's elder son-in-law & Thulasi & Poongothai's husband
- Rajkanth as Pandithurai "Pandi"
- Sulakshana as Sivagami, as Nataraja Goundar's wife
- Meenakumari as Thulasi, Nataraja Goundar & Sivagami's elder daughter & Shanmugham's 1st wife
- Sabitha Anand as Ganthimathi, Nataraja Goundar's ex-lover & Kathirvel's biological mother
  - Unknown as Young Ganthimathi
- Azhagu as Gnanavel, Kathirvel's maternal uncle & Ganthimathi's brother
  - Lingesawaran as Young Gnanavel
- Vidharth/Deepak Dinkar as Ramesh (James), Nataraja Goundar & Sivagami's younger son-in-law & Vidya's husband
- Dev Anand Sharma/ Shreekumar Ganesh as Ashok, Pandithurai's brother & Vidya's ex-lover
- Vaishnavi/Sri Vidya as Vidya, Nataraja Goundar & Sivagami's younger daughter & Ramesh's wife
- Rindhiya as Poongothai, Shanmugham's 2nd wife
- Deepa Shankar as Revathy, Nataraja Goundar & Sivagami's youngest daughter-in-law & Siva's 1st wife
- Poovilangu Mohan as Mohana Sundaram Goundar, Vidya's father-in-law & Ramesh & Ganesh's father
- George Vishnu/Shyam Ganesh as Moorthy, Nataraja Goundar's eldest son & Karpagam's husband
- Sureshwar as Bhaskar, Nataraja Goundar's middle son & Malliga's husband
- Nithya Ravindar as Sharadha, Vidya's mother-in-law & Ramesh & Ganesh's mother
- Sonia Bose as Karpagam, Nataraja Goundar's eldest daughter-in-law & Moorthy's wife
- Sneha Eswar (Sneha Nambiar) as Malliga as Nataraja Goundar & Sivagami's middle daughter-in-law & Bhaskar's wife
- Vasu Vikram as Sundaresan Goundar, Sivagami's brother & Revathi's father
- Unknown/Jayashree as Kavitha, Kathirvel's wife, Ganthimathi's daughter-in-law
- Chithra as Indra Ramanathan as Kavitha, Prabha & Padmini's mother
- Kaveri as Padmini "Puppy" as Kavitha's elder sister
- Aishwarya as Prabha, Kavitha's younger sister
- Akhila as Amala, Nataraja Goundar & Sivagami's ex-daughter-in-law & Siva's ex-wife (2nd wife)
- Srilekha Rajendran as Moorthy's mother-in-law & Karpagam's mother
- Revathi Shankar as Bhaskar's mother-in-law & Malliga's mother
- Vijay Krishnaraj as Paramasivam, Moorthy's father-in-law & Karpagam's father
- Kaveri Babu as Ramasamy, Bhaskar's father-in-law & Malliga's father
- Chandrabose as Sivalingam "Lingam"
- K. S. G. Venkatesh as Rajasekhar, Amala's father & Siva's ex-father-in-law
- V. C. Jeyamani as Viswanathan Goundar, Thulasi & Poongothai's father-in-law & Shanmugham's father
- K. S. Jayalakshmi as Sundari, Ramesh & Ganesh's paternal aunt & Dharshini's mother
- Gowthami Vembunathan as Saraswathi, Thulasi & Poongothai's mother-in-law & Shanmugham's mother
- Swetha Bharathi as Dharshini, Ramesh & Ganesh's paternal cousin
- Hema/Bhuvana as Valli, Pandithurai's wife
- Vatsala Rajagopal as Dhanavalli, Poongothai's foster grandmother
- Karna as Panneerselvam "Panneer", Ramesh & Ganesh's uncle & Dharshini's father
- Rajkumar as Siva, Nataraja Goundar & Sivagami's youngest son, Revathy's husband & Amala's ex-husband
- Arun Prabu Purushothaman (Arun Nepal) as Ganesh, Vidya's brother-in-law & Ramesh's brother
- T. S. Raghavendra as Palaniappan, Nataraja Goundar's friend & astrologer
- K. R. Selvaraj as Manohar, Shanmugham's maternal uncle & Saraswathi's brother
- Mythili as Vasuki as Palaniappan's wife
- Shobana as Valarmathi "Valar", Shanmugham's aunt Saraswathi's sister-in-law
- Manorama as Meenatchi Sr, Nataraja Goundar's mother
- Mohan Sharma as Jaya Prakash "JP"
- Meera Krishnan as Sangeetha
- Sathish as Meyyappan
- Vairavaraj as Perumalsamy
- Birla Bose as Saravana Kumar
- Parthan as Swaminathan
- Andrew Jesudoss as a jailer
- MLA Thangaraj as Saminathan, Nataraja Goundar's friend & farmer
- Soodhu Kavvum Sivakumar as Durai, Shanmugham's friend & colleague
- M. D. Mohan as Mani, Shanmugham's friend
- Sumathisri as Amutha, Siva & Amala's maid
- Usha Elizabeth Suraj as Uma, Durai' wife
- K. R. Vatsala as Sorna
- Rangammal as a midwife
- Cable Shankar as Shanmughanathan as Kathirvel's adopted father & Gnanavel's employer
- Auditor Sridhar as Arunachalam
- Viji Kannan as Mudaliyar's wife
- Vaani as Reddy's wife
- S. Ramakrishnan as Kavitha & Prabha's maternal uncle, Indra Ramanathan's cousin
- Baby Bharathi as Meenatchi Jr, Nataraja Goundar & Sivagami's granddaughter & Moorthy & Karpagam's daughter
- Master Vignesh as Karthik, Nataraja Goundar's grandson & Bhaskar & Malliga's son
- S. R. Kaviya Varshini Arun as Shamini, Ramesh 's college mate
- Vairavaraj as Perumalsamy, deputy superintendent of police
- Sathish Kumar as Meyyappan, superintendent of police
- Sumathi Sri as Amutha
- S. Gokul Thilak
- L. Muthukumarasamy
- S. T. P. Rosary as Sadhasivam
- Chelladurai as a police constable
- Veera as a police constable
- Muralidhar Raj as Mads, Kavitha & Prabha's brother-in-law, Padmini's husband
- S. Kamesh Kumar as Kishore, Amala's friend
- Adams as Siva's friend
- Jayasurya as Sekhar, Sivalingam's aide
- Dayalan as Kasi, Pandithurai's aide
- Srejeth as Santhanam, Mohana Sundaram's auditor's assistant
- Haaris as Ramesh's friend
- T. Deepa as Aasaithambi's wife
- Ramesh
- N. P. Jothi as Sivalingam's henchman
- Senthilvel as Sivalingam's henchman
- Jayanthi Shankar as Sharadha's relative
- C. Pauline as Shanmugham's neighbour
- Pattukottai Sivanarayamoorthy special appearance in the title song
- Master Babur Siddique special appearance in the title song

== Production ==
=== Development ===
Cine Times Entertainment decided to produce Malargal as a replacement for their abruptly ended series Muhurtham which was produced as a replacement for their highly successful series Metti Oli. Cine Times Entertainment signed television writer & director Badri as the screenplay writer & director of this series, who had previously directed series such as Mangalyam & Aadugiran Kannan & written dialogues in the movie London. The story was written by G. Suraaj who had previously directed movies such as Moovendhar, Kunguma Pottu Gounder & Military written story, dialogues for movies such as Unakkaga Ellam Unakkaga & Chinna & dialogues were written by K. N. Natarajan.

Later Badri had left the series to make his cinematic debut as a director in the movie Veerappu, so he was replaced with C. U. Muthuselvan & E. Vikkiramathithan as the screenplay writer & director respectively. This was the 2nd series directed by E. Vikkiramathithan after Anandha Bhavan in which he had replaced M. Thirumurugan & later worked with him as the 2nd unit director in Metti Oli. This series marked the 2nd collaboration of both C. U. Muthuselvan & E. Vikkiramathithan with Cine Times Entertainment as the former had worked as the screenplay writer in the series Metti Oli & director in Muhurtham & the later had worked as the 2nd unit director & actor in Metti Oli.

=== Casting ===
Delhi Kumar, Chetan & Abhishek were signed as the male leads Nataraja Goundar, Kathirvel & Shanmugham respectively in this series. This series marked the 2nd collaboration of the former with Cine Times Entertainment after Metti Oli & the 2nd collaboration of the later 2 with Badri after the series Aadugiran Kannan. Sulakshana & Meenakumari were signed as the female leads Sivagami & Thulasi respectively in this series.

Manorama, Azhagu, Rajkanth, Poovilangu Mohan, Sabitha Anand, Nithya Ravindar, Sonia Bose, George Vishnu, Sureshwar, Vasu Vikram, Chandrabose, Sneha Eeswar, Dev Anand, Vaishnavi, Deepa Shankar, Rindhiya, Mohan Sharma, Sathish, Vairavaraj, Vijay Krishnaraj, Kaveri Babu, Srilekha Rajendran, Revathy Shankar, Meera Krishnan, Hema, Akhila, Swetha Bharathy, K. S. G. Venkatesh, T. S. Raghavendra, Mythili, MLA Thangaraj, K. S. Jayalakshmi, Karna, V. C. Jeyamani, Gowthami Vembunathan, Vatsala Rajagopal, Soodhum Kavvum Sivakumar, Usha Elizabeth Suraj, Vidharth, Arun Prabu Purushothaman & Rajkumar were cast in supporting as well as negative characters in this series.

Music director Chandrabose who had composed many movies & series, made his acting debut in television through this series. After the series progressed some actors & actresses got replaced for various reasons. Vaishnavi, George Vishnu, Dev Anand, Hema Vidhaarth & Jayashree got replaced with Sri Vidya, Shyam Ganesh, Sreekumar, Bhuvana & Deepak Dinkar respectively. The most notable replacement was Vaishnavi because this was her final series as she had committed suicide during the filming of this series, subsequently got replaced with Sri Vidya & Dev Anand who was believed to be involved in Vaishnavi's suicide case was subjected to investigations, as a result he also got replaced with Sreekumar.

=== Filming ===
The series was filmed in Chennai, Poonamalee, Nazarethpettai, Gerugambakkam, Kovur, Porur, Kanchipuram, Valasaravakkam, Baluchetty Chatram, Kundrathur, Tambaram, Padappai, Chittoor, Peddapuram & Bangalore.

== Soundtrack ==
The title song was composed by Vijay Antony, while the background score & the other songs were composed by Sanjeev Ratheen. Lyrics were written by Palani Bharathi.

Track list
No.	Title	Lyrics	Music	Singer(s)	Length
1.	"Arisi Mavale Kolam Podu அரிசி மாவாலே கோலம் போடு"	Palani Bharathi	Vijay Antony	Rahul Nambiar, G. Gayathri Devi, Master Sooraj, Baby Shruthi Harini	3:58
2.	"Yarukkaga Yarukkaga Malargal Malargiratho யாருக்காக யாருக்காக மலர்கள் மலர்கிறதோ"	Palani Bharathi	Sanjeev Ratheen		1:09

== Awards ==
Year	Award	Category	Recipient	Role	Result
2006	Tamil Nadu State Television Awards	Best Actor	Abishek Shankar	Shanmugham	Won
