= Thalayanai Pookal =

Indian television series

- Genre: Soap
- Based on: Thalayanai Pookal Novel
- Written by: Balakumaran; Dialogues; N.Jeganathan; Shivanarayanan; Shankarapandi; N.Rama Gopinath
- Screenplay by: Francis Papu; V.Chandrasekhar; R.K.Vijaykumar; Rajai
- Story by: Balakumaran
- Directed by: Franchis Papu (1-100); Ram Kumaradhas (100-123); K.Sulaiman (123-384); A.N.Jaheer Hussain (385-497); M.Shankar (498-549)
- Creative directors: R.K.Raghunath; Jayasri Shridhar; Francis Papu
- Starring: Nisha Krishnan; Anjali Rao; Sandra Amy; Neelima Rani; Delhi Kumar; Prakash Rajan; Navin Kumar
- Theme music composer: Kiran
- Opening theme: Ilayavan
- Country of origin: India
- Original language: Tamil
- No. of episodes: 549

Production
- Producer: Vimala Ramanan
- Cinematography: K.C.Ramesh; Pazhanikumar Manikkam; Sumee Baskaran
- Editor: Sajin.C
- Camera setup: Multi-camera
- Running time: 22 minutes
- Production company: Hansa Vision

Original release
- Network: Zee Tamil
- Release: 23 May 2016 – 29 June 2018

Thalayanai Pookal is a 2016 Tamil family soap opera that airs on Zee Tamil. The show aired from 23 May 2016 to 29 June 2018 on Monday to Friday at 9:00 (IST). Later from 16 October 2017, the show shifted from Monday to Friday at 10:00 (IST). On 23 April 2018, the show shifted again to air Monday through Friday at 22:30 (IST) for 549 Episodes. The story is partially based on Balakumaran's novel Thalayanai Pookal. The show starred Anjali Rao, Nisha Krishnan, Sandra Amy, Delhi Ganesh Shrekar, Shreekumar, Neelima Rani and among others.

== Plot ==
It is the story of Vedavalli, a brilliant and pragmatic middle class young girl who gets married into a wealthy joint family and fights to keep it united. The story is about family values, women empowerment and triumph of right thinking over evil intent.

Vedavalli and Sundar are engaged to get married. On the marriage day, Kalpana, a worker in Sundar's company, marries Sundar by using some dirty tactics. Nagarajan brings home Mallika and her mother to work in their home. Mallika wants to marry Nagarajan to settle in life.

Vedavalli's marriage is fixed with Vivek again but Vivek dies in an accident on the morning of the wedding. Nagarajan was forced to marry Vedavalli due to his father's request. The rest of the story is on how Vedavalli and Nagarajan overcome the differences between them and learn to love each other while fight against the obstacles arise in their life with the power of their love.

== Cast ==
=== Main ===
- Nisha Ganesh (Epi: 1-340) and Anjali Rao (Epi: 341-549) as Vethavalli Nagarajan
- Shreekumar (Epi: 1-508) and Navin Kumar (Epi:509-549) as Nagarajan Ramanathan - Ramanathan's second son/S.Velraj
- Neelima Rani as Mallika
- Sandra Amy as Kalpana Sundharrajan - Sundhar's wife and the first daughter-in-law of the Ramanathan family.
- Shrikar and Prakash Rajan as Sundharrajan Ramanathan, Ramanathan's first son

=== Supporting ===
- Delhi Kumar as Ramanathan - Father of Sundharrajan, Nagarajan and Natarajan
- Sridhar as Natarajan Ramanathan, Ramanathan's youngest son
- Anandhi as Anitha Natarajan, Natarajan's wife, youngest daughter-in-law
- Vanitha Hariharan as Manju
- Vizuthugal Santhanam as Vedhavalli's father
- Babita as Vedhavalli's mother
- Azhagappan as Panchayathu
- Sairam as Kalpana's father
- Tharani as Kalpana's mother
- Sudha

== Production ==
=== Casting ===
The series is a Family story. Nisha Krishnan formerly of the series Kana Kanum Kalangal Kallooriyin Kadhai, Deivamagal, Office and Saravanan Meenatchi (season 2) plays the lead female role of Vethavalli. Later Anjali Rao was replaced role of Vethavalli in Episode: 440. Shreekumar landed in lead male role of Nagarajan, who has appeared in many Tamil language serials likes Naanal, Uravugal and Bommalattam. Sandra Amy and Neelima Rani was cast to portray the negative role of Kalpana and Mallika. Other Important cast include Shrikar, Prakash Rajan, Delhi Kumar, Anandhi and Sridhar.

=== Soundtrack ===
Track list
No.	Title	Singer(s)	Length
1.	"Enakku Vassa Pandadi (எனக்கு வாச்ச பொண்டாடி)"	K. S. Chitra	1:15

=== Airing History ===
The show premiered from 23 May 2016 on Monday to Friday at 9:00PM (IST). Later, the timing for this show changed after 16 October 2017 when a new show named Sembaruthi replaced the time pushing this serial to air Monday to Friday at 10:00PM (IST). from 23 April 2018, the show shifted to airs Monday through Friday at 10:30PM (IST). a show named Rekka Katti Parakkudhu Manasu replaced the time.

Airing Date	Days	Time (IST)	Episodes
23 May 2016 - 13 October 2017	Mon-Fri	21:00	1-365
16 October 2017 – 20 April 2018	Mon-Fri	22:00	366-499
23 April 2018 – 29 June 2018	Mon-Fri	22:30	500-549
