= K. S. Jayalakshmi =

Indian film and television actress

- Occupation: Actress
- Years active: 1976 – present

K. S. Jayalakshmi is an Indian actress who works in the Tamil film and television industries. She has acted in comedy roles in movies. Jayalakshmi made her acting debut in a Kannada film before acting in the Tamil film Etharkum Thuninthavan released in 1976.

== Career ==
She has since then been featured in more than a hundred films, including Agni Satchi, Poikkal Kudhirai, Manathil Uruthi Vendum, Guru Sishyan, Pudhu Pudhu Arthangal and Kaadhale Nimmadhi.

She was regularly cast in productions by Kavithalaya Productions and has acted in numerous films by K. Balachander.

== Filmography ==
=== Television ===
Serials

Year	Title	Role	Channel
1999	Kasalavu Nesam	Madhavi Devi	Sun TV
2000–2001	Chithi		Sun TV
2001–2002	Alaigal	Shakunthala	Sun TV
2003	Roja	Rajalakshmi	Jaya TV
2003–2004	Annamalai	Bhargavi	Sun TV
2005–2006	Manaivi	Malashree's mother	Sun TV
2006–2008	Lakshmi	Chamundeswari	Sun TV
2008–2010	Athipookal		Sun TV
2009–2010	Karunamanjari		Raj TV
2010–2012	Uravugal	Meenakshi	Sun TV
2011–2015	Thendral	Thamizh's mother	Sun TV
2013–2015	Valli	Shanthi	Sun TV
2013–2015	Ponnunjal	Krishnaveni	Sun TV
2013–2016	Bhairavi Aavigalukku Priyamanaval	Bombay Maami	Sun TV
2014	Mannan Magal		Jaya TV
2015–2016	Chandralekha	Tamilarasi	Sun TV
2015–2017	Vamsam	Solaiyamma	Sun TV
2019–2023	Pandavar Illam	Valli	Sun TV
2020–2021	Neethane Enthan Ponvasantham	Samiyadi	Zee Tamil
2021–2022	Pudhu Pudhu Arthangal	Parimalam	Zee Tamil
2023	Peranbu		Zee Tamil
2024–2025	Veetuku Veedu Vaasapadi	Krishnaveni’s mother Meena	Star Vijay

Reality shows

- Vaanam Vasapadum
- Super Kudumbam Season 1
- Sooriya Vanakkam
- Sollathan Ninaikiren
- Sagara Sangama
- Puthiya Paatukal
- Poi Solla Porom

=== Films ===
Year	Film	Role	Notes
1977	Etharkum Thuninthavan		Tamil debut as Heroine
1978	Adhirstakaran		
1980	Moodu Pani	Prostitute	
1981	Ellam Inba Mayam		
1983	Agni Satchi		
1983	Poikkal Kudhirai		
1986	Punnagai Mannan	Malini's mother	
1987	Manathil Uruthi Vendum		
1988	Guru Sishyan	Call girl	
1988	Unnal Mudiyum Thambi		
1988	Poonthotta Kaavalkaaran		
1989	Pudhu Pudhu Arthangal		
1990	Pulan Visaranai	Parvathi	
1990	Ulagam Pirandhadhu Enakkaga		
1991	En Rasavin Manasile	Pannaiyar's wife	
1991	Nee Pathi Naan Pathi		
1991	Kurumbukkaran		
1991	Azhagan	Swapna's teacher	
1991	Oru Veedu Iru Vaasal	Sivappu Rukmani	
1992	Idhuthanda Sattam		
1992	Naalaiya Theerpu	Ambika	
1992	Oor Mariyadhai		
1993	Porantha Veeda Puguntha Veeda	Lilly	
1994	Ilaignar Ani	Pudina	
1994	Vanaja Girija	Mary	
1995	En Pondatti Nallava		
1995	Witness	Ashok's mother	
1996	Sivasakthi	Kameswari	
1997	Love Today	Preethi's mother	
1997	Aahaa Enna Porutham	Jack-an-Jill's mother	
1998	Kaadhale Nimmadhi		
1999	Kummi Paattu	Amaravathi's mother	
1999	Oruvan		
1999	Anbulla Kadhalukku		
2000	Kannan Varuvaan		
2002	Pammal K. Sambandam		
2003	Thithikkudhe	Film financier	
2005	Dancer		
2015	Naalu Policeum Nalla Irundha Oorum		
2025	Madha Gaja Raja	Kalyanasundaram's mother-in-law	
