= Yaaradi Nee Mohini (TV series) =

2017 Indian Tamil-language Thriller TV series

- Genre: Supernatural; Thriller
- Created by: Tamil Dassan
- Written by: E. Ashokan; M.R Ponn Ilango (Dialogues)
- Directed by: N. Priyan
- Starring: Shreekumar; Nachathira; Surjith Ansary; Chaitra Reddy
- Theme music composer: Vishal Chandrasekhar (title song); J. V. (background score)
- Opening theme: "Yaaradi Nee Mohini"
- Country of origin: India
- Original language: Tamil
- No. of episodes: 1253

Production
- Producers: Sankara Raman (1-100); S. Sabreesh Kumar (101-1253)
- Cinematography: Ma. Po Anandh
- Editors: T. Aji; S.LokeshWaran
- Camera setup: Multi-camera
- Running time: 22 minutes
- Production companies: K Studios (1-100); Monk Studios (101-1253)

Original release
- Network: Zee Tamil
- Release: 24 April 2017 – 22 August 2021

Yaaradi Nee Mohini (transl. Who Are You, Ghost) is an Indian Tamil language Supernatural thriller soap opera starring Shreekumar, Nachathira, and Chaitra Reddy. It aired from 24 April 2017 on Zee Tamil and ended on 22 August 2021 by crossing 1200 episodes. The show claimed to be the second-highest budgeted series on South Indian television. and it is the second longest ran serial of Zee Tamil after Sembaruthi.

== Plot ==
Mutharasan is the grandson of a rich landlord. After his mother dies, his father Thanikachalam marries Neelambari. Mutharasan trusts and respects Neelambari not knowing that she is plotting to kill him. Meanwhile, his cousin Vennila loves him and wants to marry him. Neelambari secretly plots against him to acquire his father's property for her children; however, a clause in the will forbids her, as it says Mutharasan's wife must sign. Neelambari brings her niece Swetha to marry Muthu and supports her. Meanwhile, the ghost of Chitra (Mutharasan's dead wife) is out to spoil Neelambari's evil designs. After a few days, Neelambari and her gang find it is the spirit of Chitra who spoils their plan.

Swetha plans to marry Mutharasan by hook or by crook. She murders Vennila's mother and grandmother, after which she gets engaged to Mutharasan. Swetha's ex-husband Yuvaraj comes to stop the marriage. Swetha discovers this and plans to kill Mutharasan's father. Now Vennila, becomes too lonely as everyone who supported her is dead.

Here comes a clever character Kalai, wife of Maruthu (Neelambari's first son) who finds the power of Chitra and stands along with Vennila. Maruthu later causes an accident to kill Kalai but she slips into a coma. Chitra's mother appears to reveal the truth to Mutharasan but later gets killed by Neelambari. Later, Mutharasan takes a liking to Ruthra and adopts her. Mutharasan does not know that Ruthra is his daughter and mistakenly believes she is an orphan, though Ruthra knows it from her grandmother, Sumangali. Swetha plans to separate Ruthra and Vennila from Mutharasan. In a series of events, Mutharasan identifies the true caring nature of Vennila and how people in the house are taking advantage of her and stand beside her in all her problems.

A priest informs Mutharasan that he has a biological child born by Chitra before her death. In an attempt to know his child, he climbs the "Siddhar Malai" and gets to know that Ruthra is his daughter. When he returns, Ruthra is abducted by a family who claim that Ruthra is the daughter of Pasupathi and Chitra. Mutharasan doesn't believe this, but is attacked by them and hospitalised. In a series of events, the members who claimed Ruthra are killed by divine interventions and forces. Eventually, Vennila brings a herb from "Siddhar Malai" and cures Mutharasan's ailment. The story now moves ahead to unveil how Mutharasan finds out the true colors of his family. Neelambari fixed Mutharasan marriage with Swetha but Mutharasan married Vennila with all revenges and problems aired by Swetha and Swetha is admitted to the hospital for treatment. Now she is cured and returns to take revenge against Vennila again.

== Cast ==
=== Main ===
- Sanjeev Venkat / Shreekumar as Mutharasan aka Muthu: Thanikachalam's son; Neelambari's step-son; Marudhu, Poongodhai, Janani and Karthik's half-brother; Chitra's widower; Ruthra's father; Swetha's ex-fiancé; Vennila's husband. (2017–2018) / (2018–2021)
- Nachathira as Vennila: Thanikachalam's niece; Mutharasan's second wife; Ruthra's step-mother; Swetha's arch-rival. (2017–2021)
- Chaitra Reddy as Swetha: Karunakaran's daughter; Neelambari's niece; Yuvraj's ex-wife; Mutharasan's ex-fiancée; Vennila's arch-rival. (2017–2021)
- Yamuna Chinnadurai as Chitra: Mutharasan's first wife; Ruthra's mother. (2017–2021)
- Fathima Babu as Neelambari: Karunakaran, Veera and Rani's sister; Thanikachalam's widow; Marudhu, Poongodhai, Janani and Karthik's mother; Mutharasan's step-mother; Ruthra's step-grandmother. (2017–2021)
- Jenithra as
  - Ruthra: Chitra and Mutharasan's daughter; Vennila's step-daughter. (2020–2021)
    - Lisha as young Ruthra (2018–2020)
  - Uthra: Ruthra's lookalike and former enemy. (2021)

=== Supporting ===
- Barath as Marudhu: Neelambari and Thanikachalam's elder son; Poongodhai, Janani and Karthik's brother; Mutharasan's half-brother; Kalai's husband. (2017–2021)
- Gayathri / Vinitha as Kalaiarasi aka Kalai: Vennila's friend; Marudhu's wife. (2017–2018) / (2018–2021)
- Minnal Deepa as Poongodhai: Neelambari and Thanikachalam's elder daughter; Marudhu, Janani and Karthik's sister; Mutharasan's half-sister; Azhagappan's wife. (2017–2021)
- Aravind Khathare as Dr. Azhagappan: Poongodhai's husband. (2017–2021)
- Nivisha Kingkon / Pooja / Sreenidhi Sudarshan / Shalini Rajan as Janani: Neelambari and Thanikachalam's younger daughter; Marudhu, Poongodhai and Karthik's sister; Mutharasan's half-sister; Gowtham's wife. (2017–2018) / (2018–2019) / (2019–2020) / (2020–2021)
- Surjith Ansary as Gowtham: Nandhini's brother; Janani's husband. (2019–2021)
- Haris Athitya / Jeeva Rajendran / Bavithran as Karthik: Neelambari and Thanikachalam's younger son; Marudhu, Poongodhai and Janani's brother; Mutharasan's half-brother; Simran's husband. (2017–2018) / (2018–2019) / (2019–2021)
- Dhanalakshmi as Simran: Pooja's sister; Karthik's wife. (2020–2021)
- Sivakumar as Karunakaran: Veera, Neelambari and Rani's brother; Swetha's father. (2017–2018)
- Murali Krish as Annamalai: Mutharasan's childhood friend. (2019–2021)
- Magima Devi as Rani: Karunakaran, Veera and Neelambari's sister. (2017–2019)
- Ravi Varma as Thanikachalam: Neelambari's husband; Mutharasan, Marudhu, Poongodhai, Janani and Karthik's father; Ruthra's grandfather. (2017–2018)
- Manikandaraj Major as Veera: Karunakaran, Neelambari and Rani's brother. (2019–2021)
- Vijay Lokesh as Gokula Krishnan: Azhagappan's fake cousin; Vennila's cousin. (2020–2021)
- Tejas Gowda / Shyam as Yuvaraj: Swetha's ex-husband. (2018)
- VJ Mounika as Varsha: Swetha's cousin. (2019)
- VJ Sasikala Nagarajan as Nandhini: Gowtham's sister. (2019)
- Egavalli as Mohini: A ghost. (2020)
- Akshaya Kimmy as Akshaya: Swetha's friend. (2019–2020)
- Kiruthika as Pooja: Simran's sister; Ashok's wife. (2019–2020)
- Ranjith Babu as Ashok: Pooja's husband. (2019–2020)
- Sree as Nikhila: Swetha's friend. (2019–2020)
- Sairatheya as Karunakaran's wife; Swetha's mother. (2017–2019)
- Akila Krishnan as Roshini: A beautician who helps Vennila from Swetha. (2020)
- Ravishankar as Mutharasan's family doctor. (2019)
- P. R. Varalakshmi as Kulangini (2019)
- VJ Sharanya as Swetha's friend. (2017–2018)
- Hensha Deepan as Deepa: Swetha's friend. (2018–2020)
- Sivanya Priyanka as Swetha's friend. (2018–2019)
- Tharani as Swetha's friend. (2018–2020)
- Raj Mithran as Powerful exorcist. (2017–2018)
- Munish Rajan as Shanmugam: Mutharasan's friend. (2017–2018)
- Vincent Roy as Thennarasu's father. (2017–2018)
- Varun Udhai as Thennarasu: Mutharasan's cousin. (2017–2020)
- Sujatha Selvaraj as Thennarasu's mother. (2017–2020)
- Duraimani as Gowtham's cousin. (2019–2020)
- Ravivarman as Natrajan: Thennarasu's brother. (2017–2018)
- Sudha as Vennila's mother. (2017–2018)
- Sumangali as Chitra's mother; Ruthra's grandmother. (2017–2018)
- Meenakshi as Vennila's grandmother. (2017–2018)

=== Special appearances ===
- Madhan Pandian
- Subalakshmi Rangan
- Siddharth Kumaran
- Ashwin Karthick
- VJ Kathir
- Archana Chandhoke
- Zaara Vineeth
- Kousalya Senthamarai
- "Saregamapa" Ramani Ammal

== Production ==
=== Launching ===
A first look for the series was officially released on 4 February 2017, together with the first look for Poove Poochudava. Cast members from both shows were interviewed on Puthandu 14 April 2017 on the Chithirai Puthandu special programs hosted by Deepak Dinkar and Archana Chandhoke.

This horror-based love story was initially produced by V. Shankar Raman for K Studios. S. Sabreesh Kumar under Monk Studios took over the series in 2017 and continued producing the show till the series' end in 2021.

=== Casting ===
Popular Tamil TV actor Sanjeev was selected to portray the lead role as Mutharasan. In May he left the show because of an inconvenience of his role. Shreekumar replaced him in the role of Mutharasan from episode 271. Malayalam actress Nachathira made her TV acting debut with the series by playing Vennila. Chaitra was selected to portray the second leading role and main antagonist as Swetha. Fathima Babu joined the series as the main antagonist Neelambari and Yamuna Chinnadurai was selected to play Mutharasan's first wife who becomes a ghost. Besides Minnal Deepa, Barath, Aravindh Khathare, Vinitha and Surjith Ansary were added to the cast. The series features many new cast entries.

== Reception ==
=== Broadcast history ===
In Zee Tamil series history, Yaaradi Nee Mohini is the first series to contain over a thousand episodes. Programming head Siju Prabhakaran, creator Tamil Daasan, producer Sabareesh Kumar, director Priyan and the entire team celebrated the special occasion.

=== Ratings ===
It became the most watched Tamil television programme in the years 2017 and 2018 with the highest ratings of 12.46 million impressions at 8:30PM slot.

== Special and crossover episodes ==
- On 17 November 2019, Yaaradi Nee Mohini held a marriage function called Yaaradi Nee Mohini Kalyanam for one hour.
- Yaaradi Nee Mohini's cast and crew joined Maha Sangamam with the series "Gokulathil Seethai" from 3 August 2020 to 16 August 2020.
- On 22 January 2021, Yaaradi Nee Mohini held a three-hour Mega Episode focusing on Swetha's pregnancy.

== Adaptations ==
Language	Title	Original release	Network(s)	Last aired	Notes	Ref.
Tamil	Yaaradi Nee Mohini யாரடி நீ மோகினி	24 April 2017	Zee Tamil	22 August 2021	Original	
Kannada	Yaare Nee Mohini ಯಾರೇ ನೀ ಮೋಹಿನಿ	18 September 2017	Zee Kannada	4 December 2020	Remake	
Telugu	Evare Nuvvu Mohini ఎవరే నువ్వు మోహిని	11 December 2017	Zee Telugu	4 May 2018	Remake	
Odia	Mu Bi Ardhangini ମୁ ବି ଅର୍ଦ୍ଧାଙ୍ଗିନୀ	9 July 2018	Zee Sarthak	11 January 2020	Remake	
Malayalam	Aaranee Sundari ആരാണീ സുന്ദരി	26 November 2018	Zee Keralam	20 June 2020	Dubbed from Tamil version	
Hindi	Main Bhi Ardhangini में भी अर्धांगिनी	21 January 2019	And TV	1 November 2019	Remake	
Hindi	Pyar Ka Pehla Naam: Radha Mohan प्यार का पहला नाम: राधा मोहन	2 May 2022	Zee TV	4 September 2024	Remake	
Bengali	Alor Kole আলোর কোলে	27 November 2023	Zee Bangla	22 June 2024	Remake	
Malayalam	Mayamayooram മായാമയൂരം	18 December 2023	Zee Keralam	22 November 2024	Remake	
Tamil	Naane Varuven நானே வருவேன்	27 May 2024	Zee Tamil	4 July 2025	Dubbed from Hindi Version	

== Awards and nominations ==
Year	Award	Category	Recipient	Result
2018	1st Galatta Nakshathra Awards	Best Actor	Sanjeev	Won
2018	1st Galatta Nakshathra Awards	Best Villi	Chaitra Reddy	Nominated
2018	1st Galatta Nakshathra Awards	Best Serial	Yaaradi Nee Mohini	Nominated
2018	1st Zee Tamil Kudumbam Viruthugal	Best Actor	Shreekumar	Won
2018	1st Zee Tamil Kudumbam Viruthugal	Favorite Hero	Shreekumar	Nominated
2018	1st Zee Tamil Kudumbam Viruthugal	Favorite Heroine	Nachathira	Nominated
2018	1st Zee Tamil Kudumbam Viruthugal	Best Actress	Nachathira	Nominated
2018	1st Zee Tamil Kudumbam Viruthugal	Special Mention- Village Princess	Nachathira	Won
2018	1st Zee Tamil Kudumbam Viruthugal	Favorite Villi	Chaitra Reddy	Won
2018	1st Zee Tamil Kudumbam Viruthugal	Favorite Serial	Yaaradi Nee Mohini	Nominated
2018	1st Zee Tamil Kudumbam Viruthugal	Best Villi	Chaitra Reddy	Nominated
2018	1st Zee Tamil Kudumbam Viruthugal	Best Villi	Fathima Babu	Nominated
2018	1st Zee Tamil Kudumbam Viruthugal	Best Supporting Actor	Bharath	Nominated
2018	1st Zee Tamil Kudumbam Viruthugal	Best Supporting Actress	Yamuna	Nominated
2018	1st Zee Tamil Kudumbam Viruthugal	Best Supporting Actress	Vinitha	Nominated
2018	1st Zee Tamil Kudumbam Viruthugal	Best Director	Priyan	Won
2018	1st Zee Tamil Kudumbam Viruthugal	Best Comedian	Aravind Khathare	Nominated
2018	1st Zee Tamil Kudumbam Viruthugal	Best Child Artist	Baby Lisha	Won
2018	1st Zee Tamil Kudumbam Viruthugal	Best Serial	Yaaradi Nee Mohini	Nominated
2018	1st Zee Tamil Kudumbam Viruthugal	Special Mention-Best Game Changer Fiction	Yaaradi Nee Mohini	Won
2018	1st Zee Tamil Kudumbam Viruthugal	Special Mention - Pioneer of Television	Fathima Babu	Won

Year	Award	Category	Recipient	Result
2019	2nd Zee Tamil Kudumbam Viruthugal	Favorite Hero	Shreekumar	Nominated
2019	2nd Zee Tamil Kudumbam Viruthugal	Best Actor	Shreekumar	Nominated
2019	2nd Zee Tamil Kudumbam Viruthugal	Favorite Heroine	Nachathira	Nominated
2019	2nd Zee Tamil Kudumbam Viruthugal	Best Actress	Nachathira	Nominated
2019	2nd Zee Tamil Kudumbam Viruthugal	Best Marumagal	Nachathira	Nominated
2019	2nd Zee Tamil Kudumbam Viruthugal	Favorite Pair On Screen	Shreekumar and Nachathira	Nominated
2019	2nd Zee Tamil Kudumbam Viruthugal	Best Pair On Screen	Shreekumar and Nachathira	Nominated
2019	2nd Zee Tamil Kudumbam Viruthugal	Favorite Serial	Yaaradi Nee Mohini	Nominated
2019	2nd Zee Tamil Kudumbam Viruthugal	Favorite Villi	Chaithra Reddy	Nominated
2019	2nd Zee Tamil Kudumbam Viruthugal	Best Villi	Chaithra Reddy	Won
2019	2nd Zee Tamil Kudumbam Viruthugal	Best Supporting Actor Male	Bharath	Nominated
2019	2nd Zee Tamil Kudumbam Viruthugal	Best Supporting Actor Male	Murali Krish	Won
2019	2nd Zee Tamil Kudumbam Viruthugal	Best Supporting Actor Female	Yamuna	Nominated
2019	2nd Zee Tamil Kudumbam Viruthugal	Best Supporting Actor Female	Sreenidhi Sudharsan	Nominated
2019	2nd Zee Tamil Kudumbam Viruthugal	Best Comedian Male	Aravind Khathare	Nominated
2019	2nd Zee Tamil Kudumbam Viruthugal	Best Comedian Female	Akshaya	Won
2019	2nd Zee Tamil Kudumbam Viruthugal	Best Comedian Female	Minnal Deepa	Nominated
2019	2nd Zee Tamil Kudumbam Viruthugal	Best Serial	Yaaradi Nee Mohini	Nominated
2019	2nd Zee Tamil Kudumbam Viruthugal	Special mention-Rising Star of Zee Tamil	Yamuna	Won
2020	3rd Zee Tamil Kudumbam Viruthugal	Best Serial	Yaaradi Nee Mohini	Nominated
2020	3rd Zee Tamil Kudumbam Viruthugal	Favourite Serial	Yaaradi Nee Mohini	Nominated
2020	3rd Zee Tamil Kudumbam Viruthugal	Best Actor	Shree Kumar	Nominated
2020	3rd Zee Tamil Kudumbam Viruthugal	Favourite Hero	Shree Kumar	Nominated
2020	3rd Zee Tamil Kudumbam Viruthugal	Best Actress	Nachathira	Won
2020	3rd Zee Tamil Kudumbam Viruthugal	Favourite Heroine	Nachathira	Nominated
2020	3rd Zee Tamil Kudumbam Viruthugal	Best Marumagal	Nachathira	Nominated
2020	3rd Zee Tamil Kudumbam Viruthugal	Best Villi	Chaithra Reddy	Won
2020	3rd Zee Tamil Kudumbam Viruthugal	Favourite Villi	Chaithra Reddy	Nominated
2020	3rd Zee Tamil Kudumbam Viruthugal	Favourite Pair On Screen	Shree Kumar & Nachathira	Nominated
2020	3rd Zee Tamil Kudumbam Viruthugal	Best Pair On Screen	Shree Kumar & Nachathira	Nominated
2020	3rd Zee Tamil Kudumbam Viruthugal	Best Villi	Fathima Babu	Nominated
2020	3rd Zee Tamil Kudumbam Viruthugal	Best Supporting Actor	Bharth	Won
2020	3rd Zee Tamil Kudumbam Viruthugal	Best Supporting Actress	Yamuna	Nominated
2020	3rd Zee Tamil Kudumbam Viruthugal	Special Mention-Best Supporting Actress	Yamuna	Won
2020	3rd Zee Tamil Kudumbam Viruthugal	Best Comedian	Aravind Khathare	Nominated
2020	Galatta TV Awards	Best Villi	Chaithra Reddy	Won
2021	Behindwoods Gold Icon	Best Actor in Negative Role - Television	Chaithra Reddy	Won
