= Sanjeev Venkat =

Indian actor

- Born: Sanjeev Venkatasubramanian; 28 September 1975 (age 51); Chennai, Tamil Nadu, India
- Education: Loyola College, Chennai
- Occupations: Actor, TV host
- Years active: 1989 – present
- Spouse: Preethi Sanjeev (m. 2009)
- Children: 2
- Relatives: Sindhu Venkatasubramanian (sister); Manjula Vijayakumar (aunt)

Sanjeev Venkatasubramanian (born 28 September 1975) is an Indian film and television actor. He is most known for his role as Selvam in the Sun TV Tamil drama serial Thirumathi Selvam (2007–2013). He has acted in other serials, such as Metti Oli, Anandham, Annamalai, Aval, Yaaradi Nee Mohini, and Kanmani. He has also acted in a number of Tamil films, where he is known for his frequent collaborations with Vijay.

== Career ==
=== TV ===
Sanjeev's first TV role was in Metti Oli in 2002. His first lead role was in Thirumathi Selvam (2007–2013) as Selvam. He has received a Tamil Nadu State Award for Best Television Actor in 2008 and Sun Kudumbam Award for Best Actor 2010.

=== Film ===
Sanjeev started his career in supporting roles playing Vijay's friend in films, such as Chandralekha (1995), Nilaave Vaa (1998), and Badri (2001). He later went on to play roles in films such as Saamy 2 (2018), Yaanai (2022), and Trauma (2025).

== Personal life ==
Sanjeev and Vijay studied visual communications together at Loyola College in Chennai. He is the nephew of actress Manjula Vijayakumar. His only sister Sindhu (died 2005) was an actress.

Sanjeev married actress Preethi Sanjeev in 2009. They have two children: Laya (born 2010), and Adhav (born 2014).

== Filmography ==
=== Television soaps ===
Year	Title	Role	References	Channel
2002–2003	Metti Oli	Ilango	Debut series	Sun TV
2002–2003	Nambikkai	Sanjay		Sun TV
2003	Panam	Sundar		DD Podhigai
2003–2005	Annamalai	Vinayagam "Vinay"		Sun TV
2003–2007	Avargal	Ravindran		Sun TV
2003–2009	Anandham	Arjun		Sun TV
2004–2006	Ahalya	Siddharth		Sun TV
2004–2006	Manaivi	Madhan/Nandhakumar		Sun TV
2005–2007	Veppilaikkari	Muthu Raghupathy "Raghupathy"		Sun TV
2004–2007	My Dear Bootham	Vijay		Sun TV
2006	Super Boy (Telugu)			
2006–2007	Kasthuri	Raghav		Sun TV
2006–2007	Saradha	Suriya		Raj TV
2006	Penn	Solaiyappan "Solai"		Sun TV
2007–2013	Thirumathi Selvam	Selvam		Sun TV
2008–2009	Naalavathu Mudichu	Chiranjeevi		Jaya TV
2008–2010	Rekha IPS	Prasanna		Kalaignar
2008	Manikoondu	Siva		Sun TV
2008	Kalasam	Selvam		Sun TV
2009	Sivasakthi	Sevvazhai		Sun TV
2009	Naanal	Kumaran/Ganesh (Doctor and Police Officer)	Dual role revealed in climax of that series	Kalaignar
2009–2010	Megala	Prathap/Kannan		Sun TV
2009–2011	Vilakku Vacha Nerathula	Prathap		Kalaignar
2010–2012	Idhayam	Valmiki		Sun TV
2011	Thendral	Selvam	Crossover episode Thirumathi Selvam Thendral Kudumbam in 2011	Sun TV
2011–2013	Aval	Mahesh		STAR Vijay
2011–2013	Thulasi	Prasanna		Zee Thamizh
2014	Karai	Raghavan		Sun TV
2017–2018	Yaradi Nee Mohini	Mutharasan "Muthu"		Zee Thamizh
2018–2020	Kanmani	Kannan/Kali		Sun TV
2021	Chithi 2	Thirunavukkarasu		Sun TV
2022	Kanda Naal Mudhal	Kuttypuli		Colors Tamil
2023–2024	Vanathai Pola	Veerasingam		Sun TV
2024	Lakshmi	Selvam		Sun TV
2025	Veduvan			ZEE5

=== Films ===
- All films are in Tamil, unless otherwise noted.

Key
†	Denotes films that have not yet been released

Year	Title	Role	Notes	Ref.
1989	Ponmana Selvan	Hong Kong Annamalai (Nattamai)'s son	credited as Master Sanjay	
1995	Chandralekha	Rahim's friend	Uncredited Role	
1998	Nilaave Vaa	Baasha		
1999	Pooparika Varugirom	Vasanth		
1999	Iraniyan	Iraniyan's brother		
2001	Badri	Joot		
2002	Kamarasu	Rogue		
2002	En Mana Vaanil	Velu		
2003	Pudhiya Geethai	Lawrence		
2005	Selvam	Senthil		
2006	Nenjirukkum Varai	Sanjeev		
2009	Palaivana Solai	Ramana		
2018	Saamy 2	Santhosh		
2019	Agni Devi	Deepak		
2021	Master	JD's friend		
2022	Anbarivu	DSP Naresh Pandian		
2022	Yaanai	Jayachandran		

=== Reality shows/live shows ===
Year	Title	Role	Channel	Note
2007–2013	Maanada Mayilada	Anchor	Kalaignar	
2007–2013	Maanada Mayilada Grand Finale	Anchor	Kalaignar	
2012	Kaiyil Oru Kodi Are You Ready?	Himself (guest, episode: 29)	Sun TV	
2013	Namma Veetu Kalyanam	Himself (guest, episode: 222)	Vijay TV	
2017	Zee Dance League	Contestant	Zee Thamizh	
2017	Zee Super Talents	Anchor	Zee Thamizh	
2017	Mersal Audio Launch	Anchor	Sun TV	
2021–2022	Bigg Boss Tamil 5	Contestant	Star Vijay	Entered on Day 53; Evicted on Day 91

=== Dubbing artist ===
Year	Title	Actor	Description	Language
2002	Pathikichi	Devaguru		Tamil
2003	Aahaa Ethanai Azhagu	Mithun Tejaswi		Tamil
2004	Ramakrishna	Jai Akash		Tamil
2011	Uyarthiru 420	Snehan		Tamil
2022	Sita Ramam	Tharun Bhascker		Tamil dubbed

== Awards and honours ==
Year	Award	Category	Series	Role	Result	Notes
2008	Vivel Chinnathirai Award	Best Actor	Thirumathi Selvam	Selvam	Won	
2008	Tamil Nadu State Television Awards	Best Actor	Thirumathi Selvam	Selvam	Won	
2010	Sun Kudumbam Viruthugal	Best Actor	Thirumathi Selvam	Selvam	Won	
2011	Reliance Big Tamil Entertainment Awards	Most Entertaining Actor of the Year	Thirumathi Selvam	Selvam	Won	
2012	Sun Kudumbam Viruthugal	Best Jodi	Thirumathi Selvam	Selvam & Archana	Nominated	Nominated with Abitha
2018	Galatta Nakshathra TV & Film Awards	Best Actor	Yaradi Nee Mohini	Mutharasan	Won	
2019	Sun Kudumbam Viruthugal	Best Actor	Kanmani	Kannan	Won	
2019	Sun Kudumbam Viruthugal	Best Jodi	Kanmani	Kannan & Soundarya	Won	Won with Leesha Eclairs
