= Vanathai Pola (TV series) =

Indian television series

- Genre: Family; Drama
- Written by: Raj Prabhu
- Directed by: A. Ramachandran; R.K
- Starring: Shreekumar; Maanya Anand
- Theme music composer: Clement
- Opening theme: "Antha Saamiya Naan Paakala"
- Country of origin: India
- Original language: Tamil
- No. of seasons: 1
- No. of episodes: 1146

Production
- Producer: K. R. Udayasankar
- Production location: Tamil Nadu
- Cinematography: Naga Krishnan
- Editor: Sajin.C
- Camera setup: Multi-camera
- Running time: approx. 22–24 minutes per episode
- Production companies: Sun Entertainment; Aura Creations

Original release
- Network: Sun TV
- Release: 7 December 2020 – 17 August 2024

Vanathai Pola (transl. Just Like the Sky) is an Indian Tamil-language family drama television series, starring Shreekumar and Maanya Anand. The story focuses on the bond between Chinrasu and his sister Tulasi.

It premiered on 7 December 2020 on Sun TV from Monday to Saturday and ended on 17 August 2024. It was also available on the digital platform Sun NXT.

During the shooting of one of the episodes for the serial, lead actor Shreekumar agreed with the option of using real human saliva instead of soap foam to shoot the sequence of Mahanadi Shankar spitting saliva on the face of Shreekumar Ganesh as part of the storyline. However, Mahanadi Shankar refused to spit saliva on the face of Shreekumar Ganesh, and the director opted to use one of the actresses of the serial, Chanthani Prakash, in order to shoot the sequence. Later, the scene was edited with Shankar spitting saliva on Shreekumar Ganesh's face.

== Cast ==
=== Main ===
- Shreekumar as Chinrasu aka Rasu: Tulasi's brother; Ponni's husband; Kumaran's father. (2021–2024)
  - Thaman Kumar as Chinrasu (2020–2021)
- Maanya Anand as Tulasi: Chinrasu's sister; Vetri's ex-lover; Rajapandi's wife; Raji's mother. (2021–2024)
  - Shweta Khelge as Tulasi (2020–2021)

=== Recurring ===
- Chandhini Prakash as Ponni: Muthaiah and Kamala's daughter; Chinrasu's wife; Kumaran's mother
  - Preethi Kumar as Ponni
- VJ Ashwanth Karthi as Rajapandi: Sankarapandiyan and Chellathayi's son; Valli's cousin; Tulasi's husband; Raji's father (2020–2024)
- Neelima Rani as Divya: Dharshini's mother; Gowtham's wife.(2024)
- Arun Kumar Rajan as Gowtham: Dharshini's father; Divya's husband. (2024)
- Ashwanth Thilak as Vetrivel aka Vetri: Valli's husband; Tulasi's ex-lover (2020–2024)
- Naresh Eswar as Radhakrishnan aka Krishna: Muthaiah's nephew; Meera's widower (2023)
- Shruti Shanmuga Priya as Saranya (2024)
- Geetha Lakshmi as Senbagavalli: Krishna's mother (2023–2024)
- Farzana ansari as Dharshini: Gautham and Divya's daughter (2024)
- Mahanadi Shankar as Sankarapandiyan aka Sankarapandi: Gomathi's brother; Chellathayi's husband; Rajapandi's father (2020–2024)
- Bharath Guru as Kannan alias Muthu: Divya's brother
- Senthi Kumari as Chellathayi aka Chella: Sankrapandiyan alias Sankarapandi's wife; Rajapandi's mother (2020–2024)
- Eesan Sujatha as Gomathi: Sankarapandiyan's sister; Valli's mother (2021–2024) (Antagonist).
- Dhakshana as Valli: Gomathi's daughter; Rajapandi's cousin; Vetrivel alias Vetri's wife (2021–2024)
- Sanjeev Venkat as Inspector Veerasingam (2023–2024)
- Manoj Kumar as Muthaiah: Ponni's father (2020–2024)
- Dhakshayini/ Roja sholapur as Kamala: Ponni's mother (2020–2024) (2024).
- Seeni Amma as Rajakevali: Chinrasu, Tulasi, Ponni and Rajapandi's grandmother (2020–2024)
- Britto as Pulikutty: Chinrasu and Tulasi's servant (2020–2024)
- Padmini in dual role as
- Loganayagi: Nandhini's mother (2023–2024)(Antagonist).
- Inspector Veerasingam's mother
- Godhandam as Godhandam: Chinrasu and Tulasi's Servant
- Chitra Rebecca as Nandhini: Loganayagi's daughter; Rajapandi's fiancé (2023–2024) (Antagonist).
- Sankaraesh Kumar / Santosh Daniel as Saravanan alias Saravana: Ponni's ex-love interest
- Sudha Pushpa / Unknown as Kalpana: Saravanan's mother
- Muthukuppusamy as Saravanan's father
- Unknown as Vaishavi: Saravanan's Sister
- VJ Mounika as Poorni Parameshwaran: Parameshwaran's Wife; Eshwari's daughter (2021-2023)
- Sailatha as Eswari: Vetrivel's aunt (2021)
- Ravivarman as Vetrivel's father (2021)
- Vetrivelan as Shakthivel alias (Shakthi): Vetrivel's elder brother (2021)
- Subhageetha as Vetrivel's sister-in-law, who supports Vetrivel's love; Shakthivel 's Wife (2021)
- Jennifer as Chittu: Thulasi's friend (2021)
- Unknown as Ranjith alias Parameshwaran (Paramaguru): Poorni's husband; Vetrivel's brother-in-law (2021)
- Bala Singh as Chinrasu and Tulasi's father (Posthumous photographic appearance)
- Padmini Chandrasekar as Puvaneshwari; Goutham and Vasanth's mather (2024)

=== Special appearances ===
- Dharish Jayaseelan as Vishwanathan alias Vishwa:Tulasi's ex-fiancé (2021)
- Unknown as Chinrasu and Tulasi's Mother (Posthumous photographic appearance)
- Ashok Pandian as Vishwanathan's father (2021)
- Sangeetha Balan as Vishwanathan's mother (2021)
- Nidhish Kutty as Lord Kartikeya Murugan and Mukhil Sivasubramaniam (2021)
- Riya Manoj as Abhirami alias Abhi Sivasubramaniam (2021)
- Vidhya Mohan as Meenal alias Meena Sivasubramaniam (2021)
- Aravind Akash as Dr. Sivasubramaniam (2021)
- Papri Ghosh as Kayalvizhi Kutty Sundaram (2021)
- Aarthi Subash as Malliga Anbu Sundaram (2021)
- Naresh Eswar as Kutty Sundaram (2021)
- Guhan Shanmugam as Anbu Sundaram (2021)
- Preethi Sharma as Venba Kavin (2022)
- Nandan Loganathan as Kavin (2022)
- Chaitra Reddy as Kayalvizhi alias Kayal (2022)
- Shamili Sukumar as Meera Radhakrishnan: Radhakrishnan alias Krishna's Wife (2023) (Dead)
- Shabana Shajahan as Anjali (mentioned and also appeared in crossover with Mr. Manaivi) (2023)
- Pavan Ravindra as Vicky (mentioned and also appeared in crossover with Mr. Manaivi) (2023)

== Production ==
=== Casting ===
Thaman Kumar was selected to portray the lead role as Chinrasu, In December 2021 he left the show because of an inconvenience of his role.

Shreekumar replaced him in the role of Chinrasu from episode 313.

Shwetha Khelge with the series by playing as Thulasi. she quit the show.

Maanya Anand replaced her in the role of Thulasi from episode 301.

Ashwanth Karthi and Ashwanth Thilak play their supporting roles.

After Sangeetha quit the show, Preethi Kumar replaced her. However, she also left resulting in Chandini Prakash to play the role.

In August actor Naresh Eswar was cast as Radhakrishnan and Shamili Sukumar was cas as Meera Radhakrishnan in Special appearances.

In end of September 2023, actor Sanjeev Venkat was cast as Veerasingam.

On 15 June 2024, Neelima Rani as Divya, Arun Kumar Rajan as Gowtham, Sruthi Shanmuga Priya as Saranya, Sreedharan Gopal as Vasanth and Barath Guru as Kannan alias Muthu. for a new parallel storyline with Chinrasu and Ponni.

== Crossover episodes ==
- It had a Mahasangamam with Poove Unakkaga from 1–7 February 2021, and then with Sundari from 12 to 24 July 2021 and with Mr. Manaivi from 15 May 2023 to 27 May 2023 .
