= Annamalai (2002 TV series) =

Indian soap opera

- Genre: Soap opera
- Created by: Radikaa Sarathkumar
- Screenplay by: Babu Yogeswaran; Saiprakash K.Vijayan; Dialogues: Babu Yogeswaran; Saiprakash K.Vijayan
- Story by: C. J. Baskar
- Directed by: C. J. Baskar (1-278); Sundar K. Vijayan (279-757)
- Creative director: Radikaa Sarathkumar
- Starring: Radikaa Sarathkumar; Sivakumar
- Theme music composer: Dhina (Title Song); Kiran (Background Score)
- Opening theme: Tamil - "Uyirgal Pirappathu" (Vocals); K. S. Chithra; KK; M. L. R. Karthikeyan; Telugu- "Manasu Unnathi" (Vocals); SPB; Swarnalatha
- Country of origin: India
- Original language: Tamil
- No. of seasons: 3
- No. of episodes: 757

Production
- Producer: Radikaa Sarathkumar
- Cinematography: Sakthi Saravanan (1-251); Pons Chandra (252-757)
- Editor: T.Parthasarathy
- Camera setup: Multi-camera
- Running time: approx. 20-22 minutes per episode
- Production company: Radaan Mediaworks

Original release
- Network: Sun TV
- Release: 11 February 2002 – 21 January 2005

Annamalai is an Indian Tamil-language soap opera that aired Monday through Friday on Sun TV from 21 February 2002 to 21 January 2005.

This 757-episode series starred Sivakumar and Radhika Sarathkumar. It was produced by Radaan Mediaworks Radhika and directed by C.J. Bhaskar and Sundar K. Vijayan. It was dubbed into Telugu as Sivayya and broadcast on Gemini TV.

== Plot ==
The story involves the long-term dispute between the two families who are considered as rivals for the ownership of Azhvarkurichi's Annamalaiyar temple for many generations. The Annamalaiyar family’s patriarch is Pattalathar alias Ammaiyappan and Gandhimathi is the matriarch of Ratnagiri family. Annamalai is the only daughter of Pattalathar and he named her after the temple's deity. The reason of rivalry between Pattalathar's family and Ratnagiri's family is because, one of Gandhimathi's ancestor had lost the temple's ownership in gambling to the Pattalathar family. Gandhimathi also misunderstands that Pattalathar is the reason behind her husband’s untimely demise. Since then, the two families fight for the temple. Pattalathar remains as the temple head, while Gandhimathi chooses not to enter the temple as long as she gets its authority.

The trouble unfolds when Ulaganathan (Gandhimadhi's son and heir to the property) falls in love with Annamalai. Using this opportunity, Gandhimadhi demands the Pattalathar's family to transfer the property deeds of the Annamalaiyar temple to her family after which Ulaganathan will marry Annamalai. Thavasi the eldest son of Pattalathar is the one who holds the deeds of the Annamalaiyar temple. For his sister Annamalais happiness, Thavasi promises to transfer the deeds of Annamalaiyar temple to Gandhimadhi's family without the knowledge of Pattalathar.

After which Ulaganathan and Annamalai are married. Then the serial takes a turn when a murder occurs in their village and with schemes of Bhargavi, who is Gandhimathi's servant, Annamalai faces a series of hurdles and problems, but still loves and cares for her family.

On the other hand, Gomathinayagam and Shanthi are siblings and the illegitimate children of Pattalathar. They vow vengeance on Pattalathar and his family as the latter had deserted them due to several misunderstandings with their mother Thangamma. Shanthi also falls in love with Ulaganathan one-sidedly mistaking his genuine care for love. She vows to separate Annamalai and Ulaganathan due to her obsession for him. Gomathi is married to Valliammai alias Valli, the younger sister of Ulaganathan who is a childish and immature woman by nature.

Later on, the story progresses to Chennai from Azhwarkurichi. Gomathi in an attempt to separate Annamalai and Ulaganathan, makes everyone believe that Annamalai is mentally unstable. Ulaganathan brings Annamalai to Chennai in hopes of setting up a clinic there and live with her peacefully. Meanwhile, Pattalathar together with Nallasivam (Ravi Raghavendra) send Thavasi and his wife, Visalam (Kuyili) out of their anchestral home as Thavasi had made the promise to transfer the temple property to Gandhimathi’s family. The couple leave to Chennai to start a new life. However, they face another problem in the form of Saathappan, a rich mafia who pretends to be their wellwisher, but has the evil intention to usurp the temple property from Thavasi. Back in Azhwarkurichi, Nallasivam turns into a drunkard due to Tamizharasi, his wife being egoistic and money-minded. She wishes to sell the anchestral house and move to Chennai. She chases Nambi, the youngest brother out of their home. Annamalai gets pregnant.

Pattalathar and Nallasivam later realise their misdeeds and move to Chennai to be with Thavasi and Visalam. Tamizharasi too joins them and starts her dirty tricks to deceive the family members by pretending to have turned into a new leaf. Gomathi and Saathappan kidnap Ulaganathan and beat him to coma. Thavasi is blamed for Ulaganathan’s “death” which leaves Visalam to have an enmity towards Annamalai. Everyone presume Ulaganathan to be dead. Annamalai also gets kidnapped by Saathappan. A journalist named Kathir saves her.

Kathir is a widowed drunkard whose wife dies in an accident. His three daughters Jeeva, Jyothi and Jhansi, yearn for a mother’s love as they’re ill-treated by their caretaker. Annamalai becomes a mother figure to the girls and gets attached to them. Anwar, a friend of Kathir also helps him to run a criminal magazine company called “Suryan”.Later, Kathir also dies in a similar accident as his wife leaving his three kids orphaned. Annamalai adopts the three kids and raises them together with the help of Anwar.

Meanwhile, Shanthi runs from her home to Azhwarkurichi leaving her mother, Thangam in shock. She reaches Chennai to take care of the now comatose Ulaganathan, who is secretly kept hidden by Gomathi. Thangam rushes to Chennai to find Ulaganathan in Gomathi and Shanthi’s custody. Unable to accept their cruelness towards Annamalai and family, she goes away to Annamalai’s house to be with Annamalai. Ulaganathan wakes up from coma and looks for Annamalai which irks Shanthi. Ulaganathan returns home with Shanthi whom Gandhimathi reluctantly accepts. Thavasi is released from jail and is told to cut ties with Annamalai as she was the reason for all his misfortunes. Ulaganathan finds Annamalai at Kathir’s house. He asks her to return home with him. But, Annamalai refuses to come with Ulaganathan as she also wants to bring the three kids with her as they’re orphaned and have nobody to take care of them. Ulaganathan leaves Annamalai. Shanthi and Gomathi manipulate Ulaganthan to fall in love with her and becomes pregnant. Gomathi forces Ulaganathan to marry Shanthi and he reluctantly accepts. Annamalai cuts ties with Ulaganathan. She also takes charge as the chief editor of the Suryan magazine under the support of Anwar. Later, she gives birth to a girl, Surya and raises her along with Jeeva, Jyothi and Jhansi. Thavasi becomes rich after owning a granite factory named after his son, Siva.

rest of the story portrays as to how Annamalai acts as an important character in building a bridge and ending all the misunderstandings the two families have had between them.

== Cast ==
=== Main cast ===
- Sivakumar as Thavasi. Annamalai’s elder brother, Visalam’s husband. Pattalathar’s eldest son. Siva and Subhanu’s father.
- Radikaa Sarathkumar as Annamalai (Thavasi's sister. Jeeva, Jyothi and Jhansi's adoptive mother. Surya's biological mother. Ulaganathan's former wife)
  - Neena as Young Annamalai

=== Reccurring ===
- Shyam Ganesh as Ulaganathan (Gandhimathi's son. Annamalai and Shanthi's husband)
  - S.P.B Charan as Young Ulaganathan
- Jyothi Lakshmi as Gandhimadhi (Ulaganathan and Valliammai's mother)
- Shanmugasundaram as Pattalathar alias Ammaiyappan (Thavasi, Nallasivam, Annamalai, Nambi, Gomathinayagam and Santhi's father)
- Devadarshini as Valliammai alias Valli (Gandhimadhi's daughter and Gomathi's wife)
- Ponvannan as Gomathi Nayagam (Pattalathar's second son)
- Riyaz Khan/Ravi Raghavendra as Nallasivam (Pattalathar's third son)
- Viji Chandrasekhar as Shanthi (Pattalathar's first daughter)
- Pream as Nambi (Pattalathar's last son)
- Kuyili as Visalam Thavasi (Thavasi's wife)
- Arun Prabu Purushothaman as Sivakumar (Thavasi and Visalam's son)
- Kiran Mai as Subbanu
- Kalyani as Suriya (Ulaganathan and Annamalai's daughter)

=== Other Cast ===
- Ajay Rathnam as Anbhazhagan
- Manjari Vinodhini as Tamizharasi Nallasivam (Anbhazhagan's sister and Nallasivam's wife)
- Sindhu as Thulasi Anbhazhagan (Anbhazhagan's wife)
- Pasi Sathya as Sankari Paati (Pattalathar's elder sister)
- Poovilangu Mohan as Mandiramoorthy alias Kangaaniyaar
- Sonia as Chellamma, Mandiramoorthy's wife
- Sanjeev as Vinayagam "Vinay" (Mandiramoorthy's elder son)
- Venkat as Subramani "Subbu" (Mandiramoorthy's second son, Vinay's twin brother. Jyothi's husband)
- Shobana as Mandiramoorthy's mother-in-law, Chellamma and Poongodi's mother and Vinay and Subbu's maternal grandmother.
- Sivakavitha as Poongodi (Chellamma's sister and Mandiramoorthy's sister in law)
- Raani as Meena (Vinayagam's wife)
- Meera Krishnan as Thangamma (Pattalathar's second wife and Gomathi Nayagam and Santhi's mother)
- Vijay Adhiraj as Anwar (Annamalai's friend)
- T. V. Varadarajan as Doctor Sivam, Ulaganathan's friend
- Prithi as Nargis (Anwar's sister)
- Devi Priya as Maryam Anwar (Anwar's wife)
- Dev Anand Sharma as Basheer (Nargis' husband)
- Bhanu Prakash as Kathiresan alias Kathir (Jeeva, Jyothi and Jhansi's father)
- Nandakumar as Sathappan (Kathir's elder brother)
- Deepa Venkat as Jeeva (Kathir's first daughter and Annamalai's adoptive daughter. Shakthi's wife)
- Iswarya as Jyothi (Kathir's second daughter and Annamalai's adoptive daughter. Subbu's wife)
- Pooja as Jhansi (Kathir's last daughter, Annamalai's adoptive daughter and Nambi's wife)
- N. Santhanam/Sureshwar as Sakthi (Jeeva's husband)
- Vizhuthugal Santhanam as Sakthi's father
- Bombay Gnanam/Revathee Shankar as Sakthi's mother
- Cheenu Mohan as Sakthi's brother
- Shobana as Shobhana (Sakthi's sister-in-law)
- Latha Rao/ Geethalakshmi as Latha (Sakthi's sister)
- Sai Prashanth as Diwakar
- Idichapuli Selvaraj as Diwakar's father
- Gauthami Vembunathan as Diwakar's mother
- Priyanka as Sheela (Diwakar's sister)
- Pollachi Babu as Santhanam
- Sadhasivam as Nellaiappan
- K. S. Jayalakshmi as Bhargavi (Gandhimadhi's servant)
- Ramachandran as Nagaraj
- Keerthana as Indumathy
- Delhi Kumar as Seshadri (Pattalathar's legal advisor)
- Nagesh Krishnamoorthi as Krishnamachari (Gandhimadhi's legal advisor)
- Roja Sholapur as Valli, Velan's lover
- Naveen Ram as Velan, Valli's lover
- Siva as Basha
- Raviraj as Arumugam
- Mali as G.D. (Anwar's friend)
- Vijay Sarathy as Gowri Shankar ( Ulaganathan's best friend)
- Kalpana Sri as Sumathi (Annamalai's best friend and Gowri Shankar's wife)
- Balu Anand as Pushpadas, A fraudulent bangle seller
- Bhavana/ Ragasudha as Meenakshi (Ulaganathan's cousin)
- Shanthi Williams as Meenakshi's mother
- Devaraj as Meenakshi's father
- Vaali as Saint

== Original soundtrack ==
=== Title song ===
It was written by famous lyricist Vairamuthu. It was sung by K. S. Chithra, KK and M. L. R. Karthikeyan.

=== Soundtrack ===
Tracklist
No.	Title	Lyrics	Music	Singer(s)	Length
1.	"Uyirgal Pirapathu (உயிர்கள் பிறப்பது) Title Song"	Vairamuthu	Dhina	K. S. Chithra, KK, M. L. R. Karthikeyan	3:30
2.	"Sevvana Veedhiyil (செவ்வான வீதியில்)"	Vairamuthu	Dhina	K. S. Chithra, M. L. R. Karthikeyan	3:30
