= Varisu (TV series) =

- Genre: Drama
- Written by: Dialogues: K.V. Pandiyan
- Screenplay by: Mitra; Shara
- Directed by: Siva Sekar (Episode 1 to 116); P. Bharathi Raja (Episodes 117 to 325) Rajan Mariyappan (Episodes from 326 )
- Starring: Haritha Jackie; Swetha Dorathy; Jay Srinivas
- Music by: Aron Suresh
- Country of origin: India
- Original language: Tamil
- No. of episodes: 435

Production
- Producer: Arun Ira
- Cinematography: K.C. Ramesh
- Editor: M. Jayasimman
- Camera setup: Multi-camera
- Running time: 22–24 minutes
- Production company: Sapphire Blue Production Private Limited

Original release
- Network: Zee Tamil
- Release: 30 June 2025 – present

Varisu is a 2025 Indian Tamil language Family Drama television series that premiered from 30 June 2025 airing on Zee Tamil and streams digitally on ZEE5. It stars Haritha Jackie, Swetha Dorathy and Jay Srinivas in lead role. It is produced by Arun Ira under the banner of Sapphire Blue Production Private Limited and directed by Sivasekar.

== Plot ==
The series focuses on the wealthy Janakambal family who live in their lavish house. Tamilarasi is a bright and ambitious young woman from the traditional town of Karaikudi. Her parents were loving. She has two younger sisters Thenmozhi and Isaivani. Tamilarasi's wedding is halted. Because her father goes missing, the family is left bankrupt, and her fiancé deserts her.

After her father's disappearance, Tamilarasi and her family moved to Chennai. She meets Cibi and the duo get into a misunderstanding. He is the grandson of Janakambal, a successful entrepreneur, who wants her reckless grandson Cibi to succeed her. She brings in Tamilarasi to set him straight. However, long-buried secrets emerge, relationships fracture and mend, and Tamilarasi takes care of her family and faces all of life's issues calmly.

== Cast ==
=== Main ===
- Swetha Dorathy as Tamilarasi / Kanagavalli
- Jay Srinivas Kumar as Cibi / Rajan
- Haritha Jackie as Janakambal: Cibi and Tamilarasi's grandmother

=== Recurring ===
- David Solomon Raja (2025) / Andrews Jesudoss (2025-present) as Ganesan
- Sonia Bose as Meena: Cibi's mother, Ganesan's sister.
- Ashok as Jayaprakash: Cibi's father; Janakambal's son
- Meena Vemuri as Amutha: Ganesan's wife, Venba & Sethu's mother
- Thidiyan as Kedi (KD): Cibi & Samyuktha's best friend
- Surjith Ansary as Sethu: Venba's brother, Ganesan & Amutha's son
- Vincent Roy as Selvarathinam: Tamilarasi's father.
- Tamil Selvi as Jayarani: Janakambal's estranged daughter, Tamilarasi's mother
- Kavya Amira as Varshini: Meena & Prakash's daughter, Cibi's younger sister
- Harshini (2025) / Lakshana Chinni (2025-present) as Thenmozhi: Tamilarasi's younger sister
- Kanishka Vijaykumar as Isaivani: Tamilarasi's youngest sister
- Geetha Saraswathi as Haseena: Tamilarasi's acting mother
- Bharathi Mohan as Kurinjinathan: Ganesan's friend, Janakambal's arch rival
- Shakthi Rao (2025) / Sandhya Dhaiyan (2025-present) as Venba: Sethu's sister, Ganesan & Amutha's daughter
- Harirudran as Prabhu: Kurinjinathan's son
- Yogeswaram (2025) / Ashwanth Thilak (2025-present) as Premkumar: Tamil's ex-Fiancée; Samyuktha's brother
- Madhumitha Ilaiyaraaja as Samyuktha: Cibi's ex-fiancé

== Production ==
=== Casting ===
The series stars Haritha Thota as lead role in her second collaboration of acting in a Tamil television series after Kulavilakku, making her comeback after 21 years. Actress Swetha Dorathy plays the lead role in the series alongside Ilakkiya and Meena fame Jay Srinivas, marking her debut appearance in a television series. Actors Sonia was cast as Cibi mother's Meena.

Actor Yogeswaram was cast as Supporting role as Premkumar, but was replaced by Ashwanth Thilak in October 2025.

=== Release ===
On 10 June 2025, the first Launch promo was released, giving a brief insight into Janakambal's past life as well as the first interaction between her grandson Cibi and Tamizh's marriage. The second promo was released on 22 June 2025, revealing the release date.

It began airing on Zee Tamil, from 30 June 2025 on Monday to Saturday at 13:30, replacing Mounam Pesiyadhe time slot.
