= Idhayam (2009 TV series) =

- Genre: Soap opera
- Written by: R. Selvaraj (screenwriter) dialogues Thirugnanasundaram; I. Ashokan
- Screenplay by: Devi Bala; R.Selvaraj
- Story by: Devi Bala
- Directed by: B.Nithyanandam
- Creative director: T.G.Thiyagarajan
- Starring: Nithya Das; Seetha; Sanjeev; Nalini; Shreekumar; Devadarshini; Neelima Rani
- Theme music composer: Srinivas
- Opening theme: "Idhayam Idhayam" (Vocals); Shweta Mohan; Ajeesh; Yugabharathi (Lyrics)
- Composer: Kiran
- Country of origin: India
- Original language: Tamil
- No. of seasons: 1
- No. of episodes: 627

Production
- Producers: T.T.G.Thiyagasaravanan; Selvi Thiyagarajan
- Cinematography: Sharavana Pandian
- Editor: S.A. Ramesh kumar
- Camera setup: Multi-camera
- Running time: approx. 20–22 minutes per episode
- Production companies: Sathya Jyothi Films; Vision Time India Private Limited

Original release
- Network: Sun TV
- Release: 10 August 2009 – 3 February 2012

Idhayam (transl. Heart) is a 2009-2012 Indian Tamil-language soap opera on Sun TV. A prime-time serial, it was broadcast from 10 August 2009 to 16 April 2010 at 7:30PM (IST) and from 19 April 2010 to 3 February 2012 at 10:00PM (IST) for 627 episodes.

This serial is produced by Sathya Jyothi Films, and Vision Time India Private Limited, It was directed by B. Nithyanandam and written by Annakill R.Selvaraj. It was also aired in Sri Lanka Tamil Channel on Shakthi TV.

== Plot ==
Prasad rapes Nandhini in a forest by spraying chloroform out of lust. A few years later she is about to marry Shankar, Prasad's friend, much to Prasad's surprise. He still lusts and wants her as his mistress. But his heart suddenly changes, and he gets an urge to marry her. Nandhini's mother-in-law Kalyani is against his wish and make sure he cannot even touch her shadow. As possessive and chauvinist husband Shankar disowns Nandhini for losing her virginity before their marriage.

== Cast ==
=== Main cast ===
- Shreekumar Ganesh as Shankar Devarajan
- Nithya Das as Nandini Shankar

=== Recurring cast ===
- Nalini as Mangalam Krishnamurthy
- Ravikumar as Gangadharan
- Sathyapriya as Padma
- Chitra Lakshmanan as Devarajan
- Seetha as Dr. Kalyani Devarajan (died in the serial)
- Sanjeev Venkat as Valmiki
- T. P. Gajendran as Krishnamurthy
- Shari
- Rajashree / Varsha as Sakunthala Baskar
- Devadarshini as Jeya
- Neelima Rani as Sumathi
- Shyam Ganesh
- Yugendran
- Sai Prashanth as Prasad
- Vijay Sarathy as Ganesh
- Ramesh
- Sudha
- Vasanth
- Rajini Nivetha
- Manoharan Krishnan as Gopal
- Bharthy

== Remake ==
The series was remade in Hindi as Dil Se Diya Vachan which aired on Zee TV in 2010–2011. The remake starred Vandana Joshi as Nandini Rajadhyaksha (Nandini), Gaurav Khanna as Prem Rajadhyaksha (Piream) and Neena Gupta as Dr. Kalyani Rajadhyaksha (Dr.Kalyani).

== Awards and nominations ==
Year	Award	Category	Recipient	Role	Result
2010	Sun Kudumbam Awards	Best Supporting Actress Award	Devadarshini	Jaya	Nominated

== See also ==
- List of programs broadcast by Sun TV
- List of TV shows aired on Sun TV (India)
