= SathiyamTV =

Indian Tamil-language television channel

SATHIYAM TV
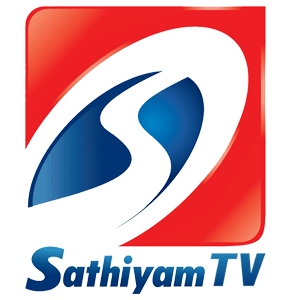
- Country: India
- Headquarters: Chennai, Tamil Nadu, India

Programming
- Language: Tamil
- Picture format: 576i (HD)

History
- Launched: 2 October 2010

Links
- Website: sathiyam.tv

Sathiyam TV is a 24x7 Tamil news and current affairs channel headquartered at Kamaraj Park Street, Kalmandapam Royapuram in Chennai.

Sathiyam Television is a part of Sathiyam Media Vision Private Limited, Chennai.

== History ==
The Modi government issued an official warning to the channel for supposed violation of programme code in two of its shows, both aired on 9 December 2014. Further, it has also issued show-cause notice for 3 other ‘violations’ in May 2015.

The channel has received a lot of response following its whistleblowing in the selection process scam of TNPSC Group 1 service exam in February 2021.

== Attack ==
A man carrying a sword entered the headquarters of Sathiyam TV and damaged properties in August 2021. The attacker even smashed the TV and decorative glass in the computer office with a handgun. He also made death threats to those who were on duty at the office. The attacker was a resident of Coimbatore, who arrived in a car with a Gujarat number plate. The Chennai Press Club has strongly condemned the incident terming it a ‘terror attack’.
