= Anandham (TV series) =

Indian Tamil-language Television serial

- Genre: Drama
- Written by: E. Ramdoss
- Screenplay by: Devi Bala
- Directed by: Nithyanandam; Cheyyar Ravi; Viduthalai
- Creative director: T. G. Thiyagarajan
- Starring: Sukanya; Kamalesh; Brinda Das; Delhi Kumar
- Theme music composer: Ramani Bharadwaj
- Opening theme: "Anandham Idhu Anandham " K.S.Chithra (Vocals); Piraisoodan (Lyrics)
- Country of origin: India
- Original language: Tamil
- No. of episodes: 1,297

Production
- Producers: T. T. G. Thiyagasaravanan; Selvi Thiyagarajan
- Running time: approx. 25 minutes
- Production company: Sathya Jyothi Films

Original release
- Network: Sun TV (2003-2009)
- Release: 24 November 2003 – 27 February 2009

Anandham is a Tamil soap opera that aired on Sun TV. It is a prime time serial. The show premiered on 24 November 2003, airing Monday through Friday. The show stars Sukanya, Brinda Das, Delhi Kumar and Kamalesh. The show is produced by Sathya Jyothi Films director by T. G. Thyagarajan.

It was also aired in Sri Lanka Tamil Channel on Shakthi TV. The show last aired on 27 February 2009 and ended with 1,297 episodes.

== Plot ==
Anandham is a family drama with elements of business rivalry, romance, murders, and other intrigues typical of Tamil soaps interwoven into it. However, unlike the stereotypical Tamil tear-jerker, Anandham depicts successful, independent-minded women rather than women battered by husbands and mothers-in-law. The patriarch of the family – Radhakrishnan or RK – is an eminent industrialist whose blissful existence is threatened by a series of events involving his four children. Much of the first part of the serial revolved around two of RK's daughters-in-law. Shanthi, a widow with a child and married to RK's second son, Karthik, is the quintessential do-gooder in the serial but much of her early days were consumed by her struggle for acceptance within the family.

Shanthi's tribulations were multiplied by the other daughter-in-law in the family, Abhirami, who had hoped that Karthik would marry her younger sister. (Actress Brinda Das, who plays Abirami, turns in a superb performance as the arch-villain). Abhirami had married into the RK family primarily to seek revenge on behalf of her late father, who had led her to believe that he had been wronged by RK in business. Soon, Abhirami began to wreak havoc on the RK family, stripping it of its family home and wealth. The tragedy of losing his family home sent RK into an ashram, where his character began to mellow. Subsequently, he reconciled with Shanthi and later accepted the remarriage of Madhan, who worked up the courage to dissolve his enforced marriage to Abhirami and return to his first love, Rohini.

A little more than a year into the serial, Abhirami, increasingly estranged from her more righteous brother and sister, discovered that she was an adopted child. A good part of the serial since that discovery involved Abhirami and her real parents trying to determine the identity of one another. Abhirami's real parents were separated from the time she was a baby. Her mother, Muthulakshmi, had left her father, the shady businessman Shankarapandian, after discovering that he had murdered someone for business gain. Muthulakshmi lost her child while trying to save herself from pursuers sent by her husband and subsequently moved to Malaysia. She has now returned in a new avatar as the business magnate Charulatha. A year on, Abhirami has reunited with her father. But her mother, who has long been yearning to be reunited with her daughter, now steadfastly refuses to accept a devious daughter.

In the latest phase of the serial, which has since been extended beyond its originally scheduled end date, the focus is again on the gathering storm in the lives of the RK family. Madhan cannot come to terms with the fact that his wife Rohini chose to pursue her ambition of becoming a bank manager and accepting a transfer to Tirupathi while his mother was lying comatose. Rohini's inability to return to Chennai in time for her mother-in-law's funeral added further distance between husband and wife. Rohini has since relocated back to Chennai, fearing Shankarapandian's efforts to reunite his daughter Abhirami with her former husband.

Meanwhile, two new characters have been introduced, Manisha, the former girlfriend of Karthik while he was on army duty in Kashmir, and Rocky, their son born out of wedlock and now living in an orphanage in Chennai and closely cared for by his aunt, Karthik's sister Anitha. As in every long-running serial, there are many sub-plots and supporting characters in this serial. But the sub-plot that stands out the most and led to a spike in the serial's popularity ratings involves a romance revolving around the character of Assistant Commissioner Durai, popularly known as A C Durai by the huge fan following that the hunk Saakshi Sivaa has garnered through the role. Durai is a conscientious police officer whose blind devotion to duty cost him the affections of his girlfriend Priya, who was subsequently adopted by the RK household, allowing for the seamless switch from the main story to the sub-plot. After about half a year of estrangement, the couple reunited and were set to tie the knot when jealousy set in—Priya misinterpreted Durai's relationship with an undercover police officer, Jamuna, masquerading as Shankarapandian's long-lost daughter. Durai then decided to put the marriage in abeyance until Priya gained sufficient trust in him. In the latest twist in the romance, Priya tries to demonstrate her maturity through self-sacrifice. She tries to persuade Durai to marry Jamuna, whose husband-to-be was killed by a vengeful Shankarapandian on the day of their intended marriage.

== Cast ==
=== Main cast ===
- Sukanya as Shanthidevi "Shanthi" Karthik
- Kamalesh PK as Karthikeyan "Karthik" Radhakrishnan (Shanthi's second husband)
- Delhi Kumar as Radha Krishnan "RK"
- Brinda Das as Abiramavalli "Abirami" Madhan (Madhan's ex-wife)

=== Recurring cast ===
- Sathish Kumar as Madhankumar "Madhan" Radhakrishnan (Abhirami's ex-husband/Rohini's husband)
- Kavitha as Rohini (Madhan's second wife)
- Sanjeev Venkat as Arjun (Anitha's husband) (RK's son-in-law)
- Vandana Michael as Anitha Arjun (RK's daughter and Arjun's wife)
- Sathish as Dinesh (Swathi's husband)
- Aarthi as Swathi (Dinesh's wife)
- Saakshi Sivaa as ACP Duraisingam aka "Encounter" Durai
- Vanaja as Priya
- Sri Priya/Jaya Prabha as Charulatha/Muthulakshmi
- Kalidas as Sankara Pandiyan (Charulatha's husband)
- Vijay Babu as Lakshman (Uma's father) (deceased)
- Jahnvi as Rajeswari Radhakrishnan (RK's wife) (deceased)
- Baby Namurutha\Baby Indra\Baby Priyatharshini as Indhra "Indhu" Karthik (Shanthi's daughter)
- Afsar Babu as Joint Commissioner Vincent retired assistant commissioner
- Venkat as Shyam (Abhirami's brother)
- Aishwarya as Ramya (Abhirami's and Shyam's sister)
- Pooja as Uma (Shyam's wife)
- Rajkamal as Gowtham (Ramya's husband) Srinivasan son
- Lakshmi as Jamuna
- Mohan Raman as Srinivasan (RK's Business Partner) (Ramya's father-in-law)
- Subhalekha Sudhakar as Sethuraman
- Mohammed Absar as Aravind
- Shreekumar as Rajapriyan
- Auditor Sridhar as Vijayakumar (RK's business partner)
- Krithika as Archana (Dinesh's sister)
- Chitra Lakshmanan as Balakrishnan (Arjun's father)
- Sai Deepika as Lakshmi (Balakrishnan's wife)
- S. Rajasekar
- Vatsala Rajagopal as Aandal
- Ramesh as Narayanan (RK Family's car driver)
- M. Bhanumathi as Saradha (Rohini's mother)
- Vijay Adhiraj as Vijay (Shathi's first husband) (bomb blast deceased)
- K. R. Vijaya as Vijay's mother (deceased)
- Nagesh Krishna Moorthy as Raja Mohammed "Raju" (RK's Family's Loyal Man) (deceased)
- Priya Mahalakshmi as Deepa Lakshmi "Deepa"
- Sadhana as Jail Warden
- Srikala Paramasivam as Seetha
- Harikaran
- Thillai Rajan as Seetha's father
- Siva Kavitha
- Abser
- Pasi Sathya
- Manindhar
- B.R Illavarasan
- Deepa Nethran
- Banu Balasubramanian
- Jaya Rekha
- Latha Rao as Dhivya
- Vijay Krishnaraj
- Rajendran
- Divya
- Sumangali
- Veerendra as Balaji (Karthik's friend)
- Sindhu Shyam as Manisha
- S. Sathyendra as Ramakrishna

== Awards and nominations ==
| Year | Award | Category | Recipient | Result |
|---|---|---|---|---|
| 2008 | Tamil Nadu State Television Awards | Best Serial | | Won |
| 2008 | Tamil Nadu State Television Awards | Best Actress | | Won |
| 2008 | Tamil Nadu State Television Awards | Best Director for the year 2008 | | Won |
| 2008 | Tamil Nadu State Award for Chinnathirai | Best Producer | T. G. Thyagarajan | Won |
| 2008 | Tamil Nadu State Award for Chinnathirai | Best Actress (Negative) | Brinda Das | Won |
| 2008 | Tamil Nadu State Award for Chinnathirai | Best Screenplay Writer | Devibala | Won |
