= Delhi Kumar =

Indian actor

- Born: A. Panchapakesan; 9 May 1942 (age 84)
- Occupation: Actor
- Years active: 1974–2020
- Children: Arvind Swamy (son)

Delhi Kumar (born 9 May 1942) is an Indian actor known for playing various roles in teleserials like Chithi, Metti Oli, Anandham, Malargal, Enge Brahmanan and Bommalattam. He has also acted in a few Tamil films, such as Dumm Dumm Dumm (2001), Kannathil Muthamittal (2002) and Enthiran (2010).

== Partial filmography ==
=== Actor ===
Films

Year	Title	Role	Notes
1974	Onne Onnu Kannu Kannu		debut film
1977	Gaayathri	Gayathri's father	
2001	Dumm Dumm Dumm	Maruthu Pillai	
2002	Kannathil Muthamittal	Ganesan	
2002	Samurai	Medical college dean	
2003	Boys	Judge	
2006	Aavani Thingal	Periyavar	
2006	Stalin	Chief Minister	Telugu film
2007	Veerappu	Puli's uncle	
2008	Thangam		
2008	Thozha		
2009	Ainthaam Padai		
2010	Singam	Kavya's grandfather	
2010	Enthiran	Vaseegaaran's father	
2013	Singam 2	Kavya's grandfather	
2017	Singam 3	Kavya's grandfather	

Dubbing artist

Actor	Film
K. Viswanath	Kakkai Siraginile

=== Television ===
Year	Title	Role	Channel
1997	Premi		Sun TV, Vijay TV
1997	Nimmathi Ungal Choice-2		Sun TV
1999	Kasalavu Nesam	Sundaram	Sun TV, Raj TV
1999–2001	Chithi	Mahalingam	Sun TV
2000–2001	Anandha Bhavan	Parameshwar Iyer	Sun TV
2000–2002	Chinna Papa Periya Papa		Sun TV
2002–2005	Metti Oli	Chidambaram	Sun TV
2002	Annamalai	Seshadri	Sun TV
2002–2004	Agni Saatchi		Star Vijay
2003	Gopura Vaasal		
2003–2009	Anandham	Radha Krishnan "RK"	Sun TV
2005–2007	Malargal	Nataraja Gounder	Sun TV
2005–2008	Aarthi		Raj TV
2008–2009	Gokulathil Seethai		Kalaignar TV
2009–2010	Enge Brahmanan		Jaya TV
2009	Vilakku Vacha Nerathula	Astrologer	Kalaignar TV
2009	Kalyanam		Sun TV
2010–2015	Mudhanai Mudichu	Kandaswamy	Sun TV
2010	Poovilangu		Star Vijay
2010–2011	En Peyar Meenakshi	Meenakshi's father	Vijay TV
2012	My Name Is Mangamma	KMR	Zee Tamil
2012–2014	Puguntha Veedu	Ramanathan	Zee Tamil
2012–2014	Paartha Gnabagam Illayo		Kalaignar TV
2012–2016	Bommalattam	Chidambaram Periyaswamy	Sun TV
2013–2014	Ranga Vilas		Jaya TV
2016–2018	Thalayanai Pookal	Ramanathan	Zee Tamizh
2017–2019	Mahalakshmi	Subramani	Sun TV
2018–2020	Lakshmi Stores	Thillainathan	Sun TV
2019	Lakshmi Stores	Swaminathan	Gemini TV
2019–2020	Pandavar Illam	Periya Sundaram	Sun TV

== Awards ==
- Sun Kudumbam 2012 Life Achievements Awards for Metti Oli
- Sun Kudumbam 2018 Best Maamanaar (Shared with Poovilangu Mohan) for Mahalakshmi
- Sun Kudumbam 2019 Best Grandfather for Pandavar Illam
