= Deepak Dinkar =

Indian anchor and actor

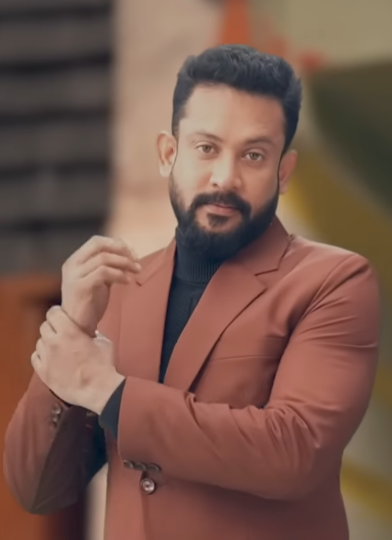
- Deepak Dinkar at Bigg Boss Tamil S8 in 2024
- Born: Deepak Dinkar; 15 September 1979 (age 47); Chennai, Tamil Nadu, India
- Other names: Thamizh, Arasu
- Education: Loyola College, Chennai
- Occupations: Actor, Television Producer & Television Anchor.
- Years active: 1999–present
- Spouse: Sivaranjani (m. 2008)
- Children: Agnidh

Deepak Dinkar (born 15 September 1979) is an Indian actor and television presenter who has primarily appeared in Tamil television. He is most known for his role as Tamil in the prime time Sun TV serial Thendral. He is known for acting in many serials, notably Anni, Rekkai Kattiya Manasu, Manaivi, Malargal, Selvi, Bhantham, Ketti Melam, Arasi, Thirumathi Selvam & Thamizhum Saraswathiyum. He is also a television host for various shows notably Jodi Number One on Star Vijay and Dance Jodi Dance on Zee Tamil. In 2024, he appeared as a contestant on the Indian reality show, Bigg Boss 8.

== Personal life ==
Deepak did his schooling in Gill Adarsh Matriculation Higher Secondary School, Chennai and studied Economics at Loyola College. He is married to S. Sivaranjani and has a son named Agnidh.

== Career ==
Deepak started his career in modelling while studying in college. After completing his studies, he became a video jockey. Later he pursued his career as a television actor and is notable for playing both positive roles in serials like Anni, Bhandham and Thendral, where he played the male lead, as well as negative roles in Manaivi, Malargal, Selvi and Thirumathi Selvam. He participated in Jodi Number One in the first season and later became a host in the second season in Star Vijay. He has acted in films including Uyarthiru 420. He was also the male lead in a film called Ivanuku Thannila Gandam.

== Television ==
=== Serials ===
Year	Title	Role	Language	Channel
1999	Jenman X		Tamil	Vijay TV
2000	Iniya Illam		Tamil	Jaya TV
2000	Butterflies		Tamil	Vijay TV
2000	Anbai Thedi		Tamil	Sun TV
2001–2002	Agni Satchi	Anand	Tamil	Star Vijay
2001–2003	Anni	Babu Ramanathan	Tamil	Jaya TV
2002 2007	Thirumathi selvak	Prabhakaran/Prabhu	Tamil	Sun TV
2002 2007	Geethanjali		Tamil	Raj TV
2002 2007	Inai Kodugal		Tamil	Raj TV
2002–2003	Gayathri		Telugu	Gemini TV
2003–2004	Rekkai Kattiya Manasu	Deepak	Tamil	Raj TV
2004–2006	Manaivi	Arasu	Tamil	Sun TV
2004	Thillu Mullu		Tamil	Star Vijay
2005–2006	Selvi	Neela Narayanan/Narayanan	Tamil	Sun TV
2005–2006	Ketti Melam	Mathiazhagan "Mathi"	Tamil	Jaya TV
2005–2007	Malargal	Ramesh (James)	Tamil	Sun TV
2006–2009	Bhantham	Selvaganapathi "Selvam/Selva"	Tamil	Sun TV
2006	Saradham	Prem	Tamil	Raj TV
2007–2009	Vairanenjam	Anand	Tamil	Kalaignar TV
2007	Meendum Oru Kadhal Kadhai	Johny	Tamil	Star Vijay
2007	Arasi	Narayanan	Tamil	Sun TV
2007	Kana Kaanum Kaalangal	Himself (Special appearance)	Tamil	Star Vijay
2008–2010	Thiruppaval	Janaki Raman "Janaki"/"Janu"/"Raman"/"Rama"	Tamil	Sun TV
2009	Roja Kootam	Sunil	Tamil	Star Vijay
2009–2012	Thirumathi Selvam	Sorimuthu Ayyanar "Cherry"	Tamil	Sun TV
2009–2015	Thendral	Thamizharasan "Thamizh"	Tamil	Sun TV
2010 2013	Thirumathi selvan	Kannan	Tamil	Sun TV
2010 2013	Kadhal	ajay jayaraman (AJ)	Tamil	Captain TV
2021–2024	Thamizhum Saraswathiyum	Thamizh	Tamil	Star Vijay
2021	Pandian Stores	Thamizharasan "Thamizh" (Special appearance)	Tamil	Star Vijay
2023	Bharathi Kannamma	Selvak	Tamil	Star Vijay
2025	Police Police	Ayiravathan	Tamil	Jio Hotstar

=== Shows ===
Reality Shows

Year	Title	Role	Channel	Notes
	Campus	Anchor	Raj TV	
	Pop Bazar	Anchor	Raj TV	
	Three Roses Perfect Couple Contest Programme	Anchor	Raj TV	
2006	Jodi Number One	Contestant	Star Vijay	Season 1
2007–2012	Jodi Number One	Host	Star Vijay	Season 2-6
2008	Boys vs Girls	Anchor	Star Vijay	Season 1
2009	Boys vs Girls	Contestant	Star Vijay	Season 2
2009	Namma Veetu Kalyanam	Guest	Star Vijay	Along with Sivaranjini
2011–2012	Home Sweet Home	Anchor	Star Vijay	
2012	Kaiyil Oru Kodi Are You Ready?	Contestant	Sun TV	
2012	Sun Kudumbam Viruthugal	Host	Sun TV	
2013	Super Kudumbam	Anchor	Sun TV	Season 1
2013	Sun Express	Contestant	Sun TV	Season 1
2013	Namma Veetu Kalyanam	Guest	Star Vijay	Along with Sivaranjini
2014	Super Kudumbam	Contestant	Sun TV	Season 2
2014	Sun Kudumbam Viruthugal	Host	Sun TV	
2015–2016	Super Challenge	Host	Sun TV	Season 2
2015–2016	7Up Upstarters	Host	Sun TV	
2016	Mr & Mrs Khiladis	Host	Zee Tamil	
2016–2017	Dance Jodi Dance	Host	Zee Tamil	
2016–2017	En Autograph	Producer	Zee Tamil	
2017	Dancing Khilladies	Host	Zee Tamil	
2017	Nanbeda	Guest	Zee Tamil	Also producer
2017	Zee Dance League	Host	Zee Tamil	Season 1
2017	Sa Re Ga Ma Pa Lil Champs	Anchor	Zee Tamil	Season 1
2017–2018	Dance Jodi Dance	Host	Zee Tamil	Season 2
2018–2019	Super Mom	Producer	Zee Tamil	Season 1 & 2
2018	Zee Tamil Kudumbam Viruthugal	Host	Zee Tamil	
2019	Petta Rap	Host	Zee Tamil	
2019	Vikatan awars virutugal	Host	Zee Tamil	
2019–2020	Dance Jodi Dance	Host	Zee Tamil	Season 3
2019	Zee Cine Awards Tamil 2020	Host	Zee Tamil	
2021	Kana Kaanum Kaalangal Reunion	Host	Star Vijay	
2021	Rani Maharani	Host	Star Vijay	
2021	Singappenne	Host	Star Vijay	
2022	Galatta Nakshathra Awards	Host	Kalaignar TV	
2022	Koodi Vazhnthal Kodi Nanmai	Contestant	Star Vijay	
2024–2025	Bigg Boss 8	Contestant	Star Vijay	Evicted Day 98
2025	Bigg Boss 9	Guest	Star Vijay	

Corporate Shows

- Nokia (Annual day)
- Pride Hotels (New Year)
- Jennys Club – Coimbatore (New Year)
- eBay PayPal (Annual day)
- Promotion of Surya Kathir Magazine
- Annual event of Tamil Nadu Arya Vaishya Mahila Sabha
- Round Table 107 (Pondicherry) – Annual Event
- Tamil Sangam of Chicago Illinois

== Filmography ==
=== Actor ===
Year	Title	Role	Notes
2002	Kadhal Virus	Deepak's friend	Uncredited Role
2003	Ilasu Pudhusu Ravusu	Deepak	
2005	Thaka Thimi Tha	Krishna's friend	
2008	Saroja	Himself	Special appearance
2010	Mundhinam Paartheney	Rajeev	
2011	Uyarthiru 420	Thamizh's friend	
2015	Ivanuku Thannila Gandam	Saravana Perumal "Saravanan"	
2020	Mighty Mahi		Short Film
2020	Knock Knock		Short Film
2021	Vinodhaya Sitham	Arun	

=== Dubbing artist ===
Actor	Film	Language
Aryan Rajesh	Album	Tamil
Sundar	Naam	Tamil
Mohith	Vishwa Thulasi	Tamil
	Uyir Ezhuthu	Tamil

== Awards and honors ==
=== Awards ===
Year	Awards	Category	Series	Role	Result	Notes
2004	Variety Awards	Best Villain Actor	Manaivi	Arasu	Won	
2007	Variety Awards	Best Male Supporting Actor	Meendum Oru Kadhal Kadhai	Johny	Won	
2010	Tamil Nadu State Television Awards	Best Actor	Thendral	Thamizharasu	Won	
2011	Mylapore Academy Awards	Best Actor	Thendral	Thamizharasu	Won	
2012	Sun Kudumbam Viruthugal	Best Jodi	Thendral	Thamizharasu & Thulasi	Won	Shared it with Shruthi Raj
2012	Sun Kudumbam Viruthugal	Best Actor	Thendral	Thamizharasu	Nominated	
2012	Sun Kudumbam Viruthugal	Best Son-in-Law	Thendral	Thamizharasu	Nominated	
2014	Sun Kudumbam Viruthugal	Best Jodi	Thendral	Thamizharasu & Thulasi	Won	Shared it with Shruthi Raj
2014	Sun Kudumbam Viruthugal	Best Actor	Thendral	Thamizharasu	Won	
2015	Edison Awards	Best Debut Actor	Ivanuku Thannila Gandam	Saravana Perumal	Nominated	
2018	Galatta Nakshathra TV & Film Awards	Best Host Male	Dance Jodi Dance 2.0		Nominated	
2018	Zee Tamil Kudumbam Viruthugal	Best Anchor Male	Dance Jodi Dance, Mr & Mrs Khiladis		Won	
2018	Zee Tamil Kudumbam Viruthugal	Favourite Anchor	Dance Jodi Dance, Mr & Mrs Khiladis		Nominated	
2018	Zee Tamil Kudumbam Viruthugal	Best Duo Anchor	Dance Jodi Dance Grand Finale, Sa Re Ga Ma Pa Lil Champs Grand Finale		Nominated	Nominated with Archana Chandhoke
2022	7th Annual Vijay Television Awards	Favorite On-Screen Pair	Thamizhum Saraswathiyum	Thamizh	Won	Shared it with Nakshathra Nagesh

=== Honors ===
Recognized by The Punjab Association as the "Jewel in the Crown of Adarsh"
