= Bommalattam (TV series) =

Indian soap opera

- Genre: Soap opera
- Written by: Thavamani Vaseegaran; S.Selvam (dialogues)
- Screenplay by: K.Vivek Shankar; Selvam
- Story by: Ezhisur Aravindhan
- Directed by: Shiva.K (1–350); S.Haribabu (351–543); G.Stalin (543–750); S.Anand Babu (751–1150)
- Creative director: A.Guru Bharan
- Starring: Sirija; Shreekumar; Mohammed Absar; Preethi Sanjeev; Delhi Kumar; Kathadi Ramamurthy; Barath; Gowri Lakshmi; Apsara; Sukumaran Sairam; Surendhar Raaj
- Theme music composer: Dhina
- Opening theme: Bommalattam Ellam Bommalattam with vocals by Haricharan and lyrics by Vairamuthu
- Country of origin: India
- Original language: Tamil
- No. of seasons: 1
- No. of episodes: 1150

Production
- Producer: San Media Limited
- Cinematography: S.Shankar
- Editors: C.S.Rajapradeep; Kondal Rao; Muralikrishnan
- Camera setup: Multi-camera
- Running time: 20–22 minutes
- Production companies: San Media Limited; Vision Time India Private Limited

Original release
- Network: Sun TV
- Release: 15 October 2012 – 22 October 2016

Bommalattam (transl. The Puppet show) was a 2012 Indian-Tamil-language soap opera that aired on Sun TV from 15 October 2012 to 22 October 2016 for 1,150 episodes. The show starred Sirija, Shreekumar, Mohammed Absar and Preethi Sanjeev.

The serial was produced by San Media Limited and Vision Time India Private Limited and directed by Shiva.K and Stalin. The title track was composed by Dhina and sung by Haricharan with lyrics by Vairamuthu. The serial revolves around Bharathi who is in love with Kathir. But, fate makes Bharathi marry Santhosh, a rich playboy and Kathir marry Santhosh's sister, Devi. Santhosh and Devi are the spoilt children of Chidambaram Periyasamy, a business tycoon.

== Cast ==
=== Main cast ===
- Shreekumar Ganesh as Santhosh Chidambaram, Bharathi's husband, Chidambaram's son, Devi's brother, Rajesh's cousin brother
- Sirija as Bharathi Santhosh, Santhosh's wife, Kathir's ex lover, Chidambaram's daughter-in-law
- Mohammed Absar as Kathir alias Madhan, Devi's husband, Bharathi's ex lover
- Preethi Sanjeev as Devi Kathir, Kathir's wife, Chidambaram's daughter, Santhosh's Sister, Rajesh's cousin sister
- Bharath Guru as Rajesh Natrajan, Natrajan and Sivagami's son, Malathi's husband, Malliga's ex fiance but then husband, Santhosh and Devi's cousin brother
- Gowri Lakshmi as Malathi Rajesh, Rajesh's wife, Dhandapani and Kokila's second daughter, Bharathi, Saravanan and Mahathi's sister (Main Antagonist)

=== Supporting cast ===
- Delhi Kumar as Chidambaram Periyasamy, Santhosh and Devi's father, Kathir and Bharathi's father-in-law, Natrajan's brother
- Sukumaran Sairam as Natrajan Periyasamy (Main Antagonist), Chidambaram's brother, Sivagami's husband, Rajesh's father
- Magima as Shivagami Natrajan, Natrajan's wife, Rajesh's mother
- Kathadi Ramamurthy as Badrinarayanan, Chidambaram's best friend
- Apsara as Malliga, Rajesh's ex fiance but then wife, Ram's sister
- Surendhar Raaj as Ram aka Seetharaman, Kathir's friend, Malar's husband, Malliga's brother
- Dhesikha as Malar aka Malarvizhi Seetharaman, Ram's wife
- Sasi as Saravanan, Bharathi, Malathi and Mahathi's brother, Dhandapani and Kokila's son
- Vithiya as Mahathi, Bharathi, Saravanan and Malathi's sister, Dhandapani and Kokila's youngest daughter
- Vijay Krishnaraj as Dhandapani, Bharathi, Saravanan, Malathi and Mahathi's father
- Sheela as Kokila Dhandapani, Bharathi, Saravanan, Malathi and Mahathi's mother, Dhandapani's wife
- Moorthy Arumugam
- Chandira Segaran
- T Rajeshwari as Rajeshwari
- Vincent Roy
- Jayaprakash as Malaichaamy
- OAK Sundar as Murugesan
- Lenin Anpan
- Divya Krishnan as Sophie

=== Former cast ===
- Ganeshkar as Bhoopathi
- Bhavana as Srilatha/ Durga
- Nisha as Tara

== Original soundtrack ==
=== Title song ===
It was written by Vairamuthu, composed by the Dhina. It was sung by Haricharan.

=== Soundtrack ===
Track listing
No.	Title	Lyrics	Singer(s)	Length
1.	"Bommalaatam Ellam Bommalaatam (பொம்மலாட்டம் எல்லாம்)"	Vairamuthu	Haricharan	3:22
2.	"Uravai Thulaitha Oruvan (உறவை துளைத்த ஒருவன்)"			4:23

== Production ==
The series was directed by Shiva.K and Stalin. It was produced by San Media Limited, along with the production crew of Sun TV Serials (2004-2016) Ahalya (2004-2006), Bandham (2006-2009) & Uravugal (2009-2012)

== Awards and nominations ==
Year	Award	Category	Recipient	Role	Result
2014	Sun Kudumbam Awards	Best Daughter-in-law	Sirija	Bharathi	Won
2014	Sun Kudumbam Awards	Best Male Negative Role	Sai Ram	Natarajan	Won
2014	Sun Kudumbam Awards	Best Couple	Sirija & Shreekumar	Bharathi & Santhosh	Nominated
2014	Sun Kudumbam Awards	Best Supporting Actor	Kathadi Ramamurthy	Badri	Nominated
2014	Sun Kudumbam Awards	Best Screenwriter	Selvam		Nominated

== See also ==
- List of programs broadcast by Sun TV
