= Bhairavi Aavigalukku Priyamanaval =

Indian Tamil-language soap opera

- Written by: Saregama; Dialogues by: Selva Pandiyan; V.Saravana Raja; Iyyappan Maharajan; V.Saravanan; Joegeorge; M.P.Karthikayan; Jagan Mohan; D.K.S.Nimesh
- Screenplay by: R.Selva Pandiyan; V.Saravana Raja; V.Saravanan; Joegeorge; M.P.Karthikayan; Jagan Mohan; D.K.S.Nimesh
- Directed by: Venkat.G; K.Shanmugam; P.S. Dharan; S.Selvakumar; Sai Marudhu; Kuruvidurai K.J.Thangapandian
- Creative directors: Prince Immanuels; B.R.Vijayalakshmi
- Starring: K.R.Vijaya; Radha; Sujitha; Nithya Das; Mahalakshmi
- Theme music composer: X.Paulraj
- Opening theme: "Ival Oru Athisiya" Karthik; Priyadharshini; Anitha (vocals); Dr.Kiruthiya (lyrics)
- Country of origin: India
- Original language: Tamil
- No. of seasons: 4
- No. of episodes: 1289

Production
- Producer: Saregama India Ltd
- Cinematography: P.S.Dharan; M.V.Kalyan; K.S.Udhaya Shankar
- Editors: K.Shankar; Muralikrishnan; Co.Parathaman
- Camera setup: Multi-camera
- Running time: approx. 37-45 minutes per episode
- Production company: Saregama

Original release
- Network: Sun TV
- Release: 29 January 2012 – 10 September 2017

Bhairavi: Aavigalukku Priyamanaval (transl. Bhairavi: The One beloved to spirits) is a 2012-2017 Indian Tamil-language supernatural horror mystery television series that aired on Sun TV from 29 January 2012 to 10 September 2017 for 1289 episodes.which airs only on Sunday at 10 PM.

The series follows the life of Nithya Das/Mahalakshmi (Bhairavi), who has the ability to see and communicate with ghosts. The show is produced by Saregama and director by P.S Dharan and S. Selvakumar. .

== Plot ==
The plot revolves around a young woman Bhairavi (Nitya Das/Sujitha/Radha), an antique shop owner who has had the ability since childhood to see ghosts. She uses her special abilities as a psychic medium to help the ghosts cross over to the Light (afterlife). Suddenly her life turns into some mysterious events where she is identified as goddess Madhura kaali, Kannagi reincarnation and is expected by demon to take revenge for destroyed him in the past. But however, she destroyed him again in the present and moves on her life again. Meanwhile, Madhura, a soft and a devotee of Madhura kaali and selliyamman started her journey to find goddess selliyamman's original statue. There, she faces a lot of struggle simultaneously, bhairavi is doing her work normally. At last, Bhairavi married Vijay, influential Zamindhar's heir but a sudden twist was happened in the story by Introducing character thamini, an evil soul who is Zamindhar's lover in the past and waits for marrying Zamindhar in the present who is actually in the same appearance of vijay at present. Amidst a lot of struggles bhairavi saved her husband.

== Cast ==
=== Main cast ===
- K. R. Vijaya as Chinthamani
- Radha / Sujitha/Nithya Das /Mahalakshmi (after face change by goddess) as Bhairavi
  - Baby Rakshana as Bhairavi
- Vibhu Raman as Abhimanyu, Bhairavi's husband
- Kausalya Senthamarai as Abhimanyu's grandmother
  - Anjali Devi as Abhimanyu's grand Mother (flashback)
- Nanjil Nalini as Chinna ponnu
  - Sumathi Sri as Chinna ponnu: housemaid
- K. S. Jayalakshmi as Latha
- Dev Anand Sharma as
- Shilpa Mary Teresa as Anitha
- Vasavi as Suganya
- Nila gracy as
- R. Raveendran "R. Ravi" (Jeeva Ravi) as Bhairavi's father
- Urvashi as Komalla bhairavi's Mother
- Suhashini as Poonkodi
- Aishwarya as Madhura
- Neha as Goddess Selli Amman
- Koli Ramya as Vilasini (Abimanyus love interest)
- K. Sivasankar as Vilasini's Mother
- Anuradha Krishnamurthi as Kaali's devotee
- Krithika Laddu as Jeeva & Jeeva's Mother

=== Recurring cast ===
- Akila as Sukanthi
- Abser as Sudhakar
- Y. G. Mahendra as Namboothiri
- O. A. K. Sundar as Maya Asura
- Mohan Vaidya as Mathura's father
- Sumangali as Madhura's mother
- Vietnam Veedu Sundaram
- Priya as Saraswathi

=== Guest stars ===
- Karthi as Sivaraman
- V. S. Raghavan
- Varalaxmi
- Rajkanth
- Raj Kamal
- Swapna
- Kavyavarshini
- Meenakumari
- Prasad
- Poovilangu Mohan
- Delhi Ganesh
- Indraja
- Kutty Pooja
- Venkat
- Shyam
- Ammu
- Shyam Ganesh
- Santhoshi
- T. R. Latha
- Raghavi
- Minnal Deepa
- Shreekumar
- Soodhu Kavvum Sivakumar
- Sindhu Shyam Ganesh
- Nisha
- Uday
- Revathy Sankar
- Vatsala Rajagopal
- Kritheeka
- Apsara
- Sathish
- Raja Shri
- Kavya
- Suhasini
- Shree
- Revathy Shankar
- Getha Ravisankar

== Original soundtrack ==
=== Title song ===
It was written by Dr. Kiruthiya . It was sung by Karthik, Priyadarshini and Anita.

=== Soundtrack ===
Track list
No.	Title	Lyrics	Singer(s)	Length
1.	"Ival Oru Athishaya Rakasiya Vellai Kayitham (இவள் ஒரு அதிசய ரகசிய வெள்ளை காகிதம்)"	Dr. Kiruthiya	Karthik, Priyadarshini, Anita	1:40

== See also ==
- List of programs broadcast by Sun TV
