= Megala (TV series) =

- Genre: Soap opera Family
- Screenplay by: Madhu Mohan; C.U Muthuselvan
- Directed by: E.Vikramathan (Episode 1-719); Salem Siva M.P (Episode 720-729)
- Starring: Gayarati Shastry; Deepan Chakravorty; Sakthi Saravanan; Yugendran; Kuyli; Shreekumar; Sanjeev; Vadivukkarasi; Srividya Mohan; Revathi Priya; Rajyalakshmi
- Theme music composer: Vijay Antony
- Opening theme: Boomikku Mugavari Pennaale - Shreya Ghoshal
- Country of origin: India
- Original language: Tamil
- No. of seasons: 1
- No. of episodes: 729

Production
- Producer: S.Sidhiq "Metti Oli"
- Cinematography: Sarath K.Chandran
- Editor: V.Singali Raju
- Camera setup: Multi-camera
- Running time: approx. 22–24 minutes per episode 7.30PM>> 6.00PM
- Production companies: Cine Times Entertainment, S.Siddiuq Productions

Original release
- Network: Sun TV
- Release: 4 July 2007 – 25 April 2010

Megala is a 2007-2010 Indian Tamil-language soap opera that aired on Sun TV from 4 June 2007 to 25 April 2008 Monday through Friday at 19:30 (IST) and from 28 April 2008 to 23 April 2010 at 18:00 (IST). It ran for 729 episodes. It had been receiving the highest ratings of Tamil serials and received high praising from viewers. The show starred Gayathiri, Deepan Chakravarthy Yugendran, Vadivukkarasi, Kuyili, Shreekumar, Rajkanth and Bhavana Samanthula. The show was produced by Metti Oli serial fame Cine Times Entertainment Siddhiq and directed by Vikramathithan. It replaced Anjali. It was also aired in Sri Lanka Tamil Channel on Shakthi TV.

== Plot ==
The story of a couple, Kalaiyarasu and Thilaga, who have five children. Kalai's sister Shanmuga Vadivu alias Vadivu lives with him and Kalai is totally devoted to Vadivu and does all that she says. Vadivu (Vadivukkarasi) tries to separate the couple as she does not like Thilaga. Mehala born to this couple and Vadivu hates that, convincing Kalai to disown her from the family. Hence Mehala (Gayathiri) is brought up in her grandparents home and Thilaga often visits to the home with her other kids. Mehala is very fond of her other siblings.

One day, due to a quarrel between Thilaga and Vadivu, Mehala hits vadivu and she got fainted. By seeing this, Mehala thought she died and ran away from home. She runs to various places and continue with her studies with the help of her friends. When Mehala was on the run, she saw an old man trying to commit suicide and she saves him from committing that. Mehala works as an assistant to a lawyer upon completing her education. Meanwhile, she tries to search for her family back.

== Cast ==
=== Main cast ===
- Gayathiri Shastry as Megala. Thilaga and Kalaiyarasan’s eldest daughter. Vishwam’s wife
- Rajyalakshmi as Thilaga, Kalaiyarasan’s wife. Megala, Shakthi, Kanmani, Chezhiyan and Keerthana’s mother.
- Deepan Chakravarthy as Kalaiyarasan, Thilaga’s husband. Megala, Shakthi, Kanmani, Chezhiyan and Keerthana’s father.
- Sakthi Saravanan as Chezhiyan, Megala’s brother.
- Srividya Mohan as Kanmani, Megala’s younger sister.
- Revathi Priya as Keerthana, Megala’s younger sister.
- Vadivukkarasi as Shanmuga Vadivu, Kalaiyarasan’s elder sister. Megala’s evil aunt.
- Aneesh Ravi as Anbu
- Yugendran/Vijaya Sharathy as Vishwam, Megala’s love-interest.
- Shreekumar as Diwakaran "Diwa", Shakthi’s husband.
- Bharathy as Diwakaran's mother
- Kuyili as Vishwam’s mother
- Rajkanth as Bhoopathy, Kanmani’s husband.
- Bhavana Samanthula as Shakthi, Megala’s younger sister
- Sanjeev as Prathap\kannan, Keerthana’s husband

=== Recurring cast ===
- Shanmugasundaram as Megala's grandfather and thilaga's father
- M. Bhanumathi as Megala's grandmother and Thilagavathi's mother
- Sri Lekha
- Pandu
- Neelima Rani
- Sumathy Sri
- Revathy Priya as kirthana
- Sangeetha as Anitha
- Rangathurai
- Giri
- Joker Thulasi as Constable Gopal
- Kavitha Solairaja as Subha
- Hema
- Sumangali
- Director Sadhasivam
- Jothy
- Senthil
- Rajmathan
- Priyanka as Viji
- Sobhana
- Vincent Roy
- Ravi Raj
- Nithya Ravindran
- kirthiga
- Kovai Papu
- Gowthami Vembunathan

== Original soundtrack ==
=== Title song ===
The title track was composed by Vijay Antony and was sung by popular playback singer Shreya Ghoshal. The lyrics for the title track were written by Yugabharathi. The title song is a super hit among television viewers.

=== Soundtrack ===
Track list
No.	Title	Lyrics	Singer(s)	Length
1.	"Boomiku Mukavari Pennale ( பூமிக்கு முகவரி பெண்ணாலே)"	Yugabharathi	Shreya Ghoshal	4:10

== Production ==
The series was directed by E.Vikramadhithan. It was produced by Cine Times Entertainment Siddhiq, along with the production crew of 2002-2016 Sun TV Serials Metti Oli, Malargal and Muhurtam.

== Awards and nominations ==
Year	Award	Category	Recipient	Role	Result
2010	Sun Kudumbam Awards 2010	Best Actress	Gayathri	Mekala	Won
2010	Sun Kudumbam Awards 2010	Best Friend	Sangeetha	Anitha	Won
2010	Sun Kudumbam Awards 2010	Best Mother	Rajyalakshmi	Thilaga	Won
2010	Sun Kudumbam Awards 2010	Best Sister	Bhavana	Sakthi	Won
2017	Tamil Nadu State Television Awards	Best Director	E. Vikramathithan		Won
2017	Tamil Nadu State Television Awards	Best Dubbing Artistes Male	Vinoth		Won
2017	Tamil Nadu State Television Awards	Best Music Director	Elango		Won

== See also ==
- List of programs broadcast by Sun TV
- List of TV shows aired on Sun TV (India)
