= Naanal (TV series) =

- Cover Photo
- நாணல்
- Genre: Soap opera Melodrama
- Written by: Khusbhu Sundar
- Directed by: Robert–Rajasekar
- Starring: Sonia Agarwal; Neebha; Shreekumar; Revathy Shankaran
- Theme music composer: Ramkiran Dhina
- Opening theme: "Nadhi Irundhal"; K. S. Chithra (Vocals); Thabu Shankar (Lyrics)
- Country of origin: India
- Original language: Tamil
- No. of seasons: 01
- No. of episodes: 120+

Production
- Producer: Khusbhu Sundar
- Production location: Tamil Nadu
- Camera setup: Multi-camera
- Running time: approx. 20-22 minutes per episodes
- Production company: Avni Telemedia

Original release
- Network: Kalaignar TV
- Release: 15 December 2008 – 2009

Related
- Manjal Magimai; Uravukku Kai Koduppom

Naanal (Tamil: நாணல்) is a 2008-2009 Indian Tamil-language soap opera starring Sonia Agarwal, Neebha and Shreekumar. It replaced Manjal Magimai and it broadcast on Kalaignar TV from 15 December 2008 to 2009 on Monday through Thursday at 19:30 (IST). It will star Sonia Agarwal, who makes her debut on the small screen.

The show is written and produced by Khusbhu Sundar for Avni Telemedia. From 22 August 2016 to March 2017 the show was relaunched in Kalaignar TV aired Monday to Friday at 21:30 (IST).

== Plot ==
Radhika was widowed at a young age. She comes out of her grievances and starts a new life when fate strikes again. She learns that her husband Rajesh is still alive after five years and is married to another woman 'Kadhambari'. Naanal is a type of tall growing grass on the banks of rivers which twists, turns and bends in severe storm, but never breaks. As the title implies, she bends and bows when the storm strikes and survives the hardships without breaking down. Kadhambari takes all sorts of efforts to prevent the union of Rajesh and Radhika. Amidst all the turmoil, Radhika learns that Kadhambari's grandmother who was responsible for the ill fate of her family. Radhika's strength and virtue are the backbone of the story.

== Cast ==
- Shreekumar as Rajesh (Radhika and Kadhambari's husband)
- Sonia Agarwal as Radhika (Rajesh's first wife)
- Neebha as Kadhambari (Rajesh's second wife)
- Revathy Shankaran
- ARS
- Vichu
- Rajesh
- Joker Thulasi
- Bhanumathy

== International broadcast ==
The Series was released on 15 December 2008 on Kalaignar TV. The Show was also broadcast internationally on Channel's international distribution. It aired in Sri Lanka, Singapore, Malaysia, South East Asia, Middle East, Oceania, South Africa and Sub Saharan Africa on Kalaignar TV and also aired in United States, Canada, Europe on Kalaignar Ayngaran TV.
