= Uravugal =

- Genre: Soap opera Drama
- Written by: S. Saravanan; Dialogue; S.S Lalit; R.Raksha; R.Usha Kumar
- Screenplay by: S. Kumaresan
- Directed by: S.N Haribabu (episodes 1-405); S.M Haribabu (episodes 406-709); K.Shiva Prakash (episodes 710-860)
- Starring: Shreekumar Ganesh; Archana Krishnappa; Bhavana Samanthula; Peeli Sivam; T. Rajeshwari; Vincent Roy; Nithya Ravindran; Jayaprakash; Bharath Guru; Sudha Sandeep; K. S. Jayalakshmi; Mohammad Absar; Aarthika Shree; Amarasigamani; Revathy Shankar; Ramachandran Mahalingam; Sivakavitha; Rajkanth; Durga; J. Lalitha; Jayanth; Sonia
- Theme music composer: D. Imman
- Opening theme: "Uravugalale Uravugalale"
- Composers: G. V. Kalai Kathir; Ramesh; Rehan
- Original language: Tamil
- No. of seasons: 1
- No. of episodes: 860

Production
- Producer: San Media Limited
- Cinematography: K.S.Shankar; S. Dhandapani; B.S Chella Pandiyan
- Editors: B. L. Shankar Lingayath, Palanisamy
- Camera setup: S. Dhandapani
- Production company: San Media Limited

Original release
- Network: Sun TV
- Release: 1 June 2009 – 12 October 2012

Uravugal (transl. Relationships) is a 2009 Indian Tamil-language television series that aired on Sun TV. This serial was first aired on 1 June 2009, co-starring Shreekumar Ganesh and Archana Krishnappa. Archana Krishnappa was later replaced by Bhavana Samanthula. This serial also reunited Shreekumar Ganesh and Bhavana Samanthula, after they both had previously co-starred on Megala (2007-2010). This serial was directed by Balaji Yadav, Shiva K. and S. Haribabu. The serial was produced by San Media Limited. This serial was last aired on 12 October 2012 and ended with 860 episodes.

== Cast ==
=== Main Lead Casts ===
- Shreekumar Ganesh as Krishnan Annamalai, Gayathri's husband, Annamalai's and Parvathy's son, Gowri's elder brother
- Archana Krishnappa / Bhavana Samanthula as Gayathri Krishnan, Krishnan's wife, Thanikachalam's and Rajeshwari's elder daughter, Sudha's elder sister

=== Supporting Casts ===
- Peeli Sivam as Annamalai, Parvathy's husband, Azhagesan's elder brother, Krishnan's and Gowri's father (Dead)
- T. Rajeshwari as Parvathy Annamalai, Annamalai's wife, Krishnan's and Gowri's mother
- Vincent Roy as Thanikachalam, Rajeshwari's husband, Gayathri's and Sudha's father (Dead)
- Nithya Ravindran as Rajeshwari Thanikachalam, Thanikachalam's wife, Gayathri's and Sudha's mother (Dead)
- Jayaprakash as Subramani, Babu's father
- Bharath Guru as Babu Subramani, Gowri's husband, Subramani's son
- Sudha Sandeep as Gowri Babu, Babu's wife, Annamalai's and Parvathy's daughter, Krishnan's younger sister
- K. S. Jayalakshmi as Meenatchi, Vishnu's mother
- Mohammad Absar as Vishnu, Sudha's husband, Meenatchi's son
- Aarthika Shree as Sudha Vishnu, Vishnu's wife, Thanikachalam's and Rajeshwari's younger daughter, Gayathri's younger sister
- Amarasigamani as Azhagesan, Visalatchi's husband, Annamalai's younger brother, Ranjani's and Mugunthan's father
- Revathy Shankar ad Visalatchi Azhagesan, Azhagesan's wife, Ranjani's and Mugunthan's mother
- Ramachandran Mahalingam as Senthil, Ranjani's husband
- Sivakavitha as Ranjani Senthil, Senthil's wife, Azhagesan's and Visalatchi's daughter, Mugunthan's elder sister
- Rajkanth as Mugunthan Azhagesan, Shwetha's ex-husband, Chithra's husband, Azhagesan's and Visalatchi's son, Ranjani's younger brother
- Durga as Chithra Mugunthan, Mugunthan's wife, Lakshmi's daughter, Murugan's sister
- J. Lalitha as Lakshmi, Chithra's and Murugan's mother
- Jayanth as Murugan, Vasanthi's husband, Lakshmi's son, Chithra's brother
- Sonia as Vasanthi Murugan, Murugan's wife

=== Other Casts ===
- Dev Anand Sharma as Natarajan, Mangalam's husband, Shwetha's father
- Shanthi Williams as Mangalam Natarajan, Natarajan's wife, Shwetha's mother
- Sneha Nambiar / Neepa Siva as Shwetha Mugunthan, Mugunthan's ex-wife, Natarajan's and Mangalam's daughter (Dead)
- Comedy Kicha as Saamipulla
- Kalpana as Devi
- Cool Suresh as Raja
- Kavyavarshini as Tara
- Sasi as Ravi
- Sathya as Sathya (Dead)

== Title song ==
It was written by Vairamuthu, composed by D. Imman. It was sung by Nithyasree Mahadevan. Other required music for the serial was provided by Ramesh and Rehan. The male version of the title song was composed by Ramesh. It was sung by Vijay Yesudas

=== Soundtrack ===
Tracklist
No.	Title	Lyrics	Music	Singer(s)	Length
1.	"Uravugalale Uravugalale (Female)"	Vairamuthu	D. Imman	Nithyasree Mahadevan	4:00
2.	"Uravugalale Uravugalale (Male)"	Vairamuthu	Ramesh	Vijay Yesudas	4:00
3.	"Vinnai Thodum Varai Poraadu"	Asaithambi	Rehan		4:52

== Awards and nominations ==
Year	Award	Category	Recipient	Role	Result
2009	Tamil Nadu State Television Awards for 2009	Best Actor Male	Shreekumar Ganesh	Krishnan Annamalai	Won
2010	Sun Kudumbam Awards	Best Brother	Rajkanth	Mugunthan Azhagesan	Nominated
2011	Tamil Nadu State Television Awards for 2011	Best Character Actress	Revathy Shankar	Visalatchi Azhagesan	Won
2012	Sun Kudumbam Awards				
2012	Sun Kudumbam Awards	Best Father-in-law	Vincent Roy	Thanikachalam	Nominated
2012	Sun Kudumbam Awards	Best Editor	B.L Shanker		Nominated
2012	Sun Kudumbam Awards	Best Screenwriter	Nominated		Won
2012	Tamil Nadu State Television Awards for 2012	Best Dubbing artist Male	Thangaraj		Won
2012	Tamil Nadu State Television Awards for 2012	Best Actors Female	Durga	Chithra Mugunthan	Won
