= List of programs broadcast by Sun TV (India) =

This is a list of current and former programmes broadcast on the Indian television Tamil-language channel Sun TV.

== Current programming ==
=== Drama series ===
Premiere date	Name	Ref
9 October 2023	Singapennae	
18 March 2024	Lakshmi	
29 April 2024	Malli	
10 June 2024	Marumagal	
19 August 2024	Moondru Mudichu	
2 December 2024	Annam	
23 December 2024	Ethirneechal Thodargiradhu	
3 February 2025	Poongodi	
29 September 2025	Hanuman	
19 January 2026	Iru Malargal	
11 May 2026	Thulasi	
20 July 2026	Siragugal	
28 September 2026	Kurinji	
28 September 2026	Abirami	
26 October 2026	Bhairavi	

=== Reality shows ===
Premiere date	Name
17 August 2025	Top Cooku Dupe Cooku Season 2

== Former programming ==
=== Drama series ===
Name	First aired	Last aired	Ref.
Aadukalam	7 April 2025	18 July 2026	
Aalayam	2000	2000	
Aan Paavam	6 February 2012	15 June 2012	
Aathira	30 March 2015	25 June 2016	
Abhiyum Naanum	26 October 2020	25 February 2023	
Agal Vilakkugal	18 February 2002	25 February 2003	
Agni Natchathiram	27 May 2019	3 April 2021	
Ahalya	3 May 2004	22 September 2006	
Alaigal	29 October 2001	23 May 2003	
Alli Rajyam	16 May 2005	17 July 2006	
Anamika	19 May 2024	24 January 2025	
Anandha Ragam	29 August 2022	14 January 2026	
Anandham	24 November 2003	27 February 2009	
Anbe Vaa	2 November 2020	28 April 2024	
Anjali	27 November 2006	25 April 2008	
Annamalai	11 February 2002	21 January 2005	
Apoorva Raagangal	10 August 2015	7 July 2018	
Arasi	2 January 2007	11 September 2009	
Athipookal	3 December 2007	14 December 2012	
Azhagi	10 October 2011	4 March 2016	
Azhagu	20 November 2017	3 April 2020	
Bhairavi Aavigalukku Priyamanaval	29 January 2012	10 September 2017	
Bhantham	25 September 2006	29 May 2009	
Bommalattam	15 October 2012	22 October 2016	
Chandrakumari	10 December 2018	1 June 2019	
Chandralekha	6 October 2014	8 October 2022	
Chellamay	14 September 2009	18 January 2013	
Chellame Chellame	15 December 2025	4 July 2026	
Chidambara Ragasiyam	29 February 2004	23 July 2006	
Chinna Papa Periya Papa	2000	5 May 2018	
Chithi	20 December 1999	2 November 2001	
Chithi 2	27 January 2020	28 May 2022	
Chocolate	16 December 2019	31 March 2020	
Deivamagal	25 March 2013	17 February 2018	
Devathai	1 July 2013	20 August 2016	
Ethirneechal	7 February 2022	8 June 2024	
Ganga	2 January 2017	7 July 2018	
Idhayam	10 August 2009	3 February 2012	
Ilakkiya	10 October 2022	14 January 2026	
Ilavarasi	18 January 2010	1 November 2014	
Indhira	26 November 2001	21 November 2003	
Iniya	5 December 2022	3 November 2024	
Jothi	29 May 2021	1 August 2021	
Kadhal Pagadai	14 December 1996	28 February 1998	
Kai Alavu Manasu	1995	1996	
Kalasam	14 July 2008	26 June 2009	
Kalyana Parisu	10 February 2014	27 March 2020	
Kalyana Veedu	16 April 2018	13 November 2020	
Kalyanam	2 March 2009	7 August 2009	
Kanmani	22 October 2018	28 November 2020	
Kannana Kanne	2 November 2020	4 March 2023	
Karthigai Pengal	30 July 2012	23 August 2013	
Kasthuri	21 August 2006	31 August 2012	
Kayal	25 October 2021	24 October 2026	
Keladi Kanmani	6 April 2015	7 October 2017	
Kelunga Mamiyare Neengalum Marumagal Than	8 October 2001	4 October 2002	
Kolangal	24 November 2003	4 December 2009	
Krishnadasi	14 February 2000	25 October 2002	
Kudumbam	24 March 1999	5 October 2001	
Kula Deivam	11 May 2015	13 April 2018	
Kungkumam	2003	18 June 2004	
Lakshmi	24 July 2006	13 June 2008	
Lakshmi Stores	24 December 2018	25 January 2020	
Madhavi	21 December 2009	11 November 2011	
Magal	8 October 2007	14 October 2011	
Magarasi	21 October 2019	1 July 2023	
Mahabharatam	17 February 2013	29 May 2016	
Mahalakshmi	6 March 2017	14 December 2019	
Malar	27 February 2023	1 February 2025	
Malargal	17 October 2005	1 June 2007	
Manaivi	21 June 2004	24 February 2006	
Manamagale Vaa	15 July 2024	9 May 2026	
Mangai	1997	1999	
Maragatha Veenai	27 January 2014	28 September 2017	
Master Mayavi	1989	1989	
Maya	9 July 2018	20 October 2018	
Meena	24 July 2023	10 October 2024	
Megala	4 June 2007	23 April 2010	
Metti Oli	8 April 2002	18 June 2005	
Minnale	6 August 2018	31 March 2020	
Mr. Manaivi	6 March 2023	22 December 2024	
Mundhanai Mudichu	26 April 2010	4 April 2015	
Muthaaram	14 November 2011	25 January 2014	
My Dear Bootham	2004	2007	
Nadhaswaram	19 April 2010	9 May 2015	
Nandhini	23 January 2017	22 December 2018	
Nayagi	19 February 2018	31 October 2020	
Nila	18 March 2019	24 April 2021	
Pandavar Illam	15 July 2019	28 October 2023	
Pasamalar	7 October 2013	31 December 2016	
Penn	27 February 2006	24 November 2006	
Pillai Nila	23 April 2012	4 October 2014	
Ponnunjal	2 September 2013	22 October 2016	
Poova Thalaya	30 October 2023	13 July 2024	
Poove Unakkaga	10 August 2020	18 June 2022	
Priyamaana Thozhi	30 May 2022	5 May 2024	
Priyamanaval	19 January 2015	11 May 2019	
Pudhu Vasantham	26 June 2023	26 September 2026	
Punitha	14 October 2024	9 May 2026	
Punnagai Poove	6 May 2024	24 May 2025	
Rajakumari	28 January 2013	7 June 2013	
Ramany vs Ramany	May 1998	November 1998	
Ranjani	4 November 2024	6 April 2025	
Rasaathi	23 September 2019	3 April 2020	
Roja	9 April 2018	3 December 2022	
Rudraveenai	21 April 2002	22 February 2006	
Run	5 August 2019	31 March 2020	
Sakthi	2 June 2014	27 March 2015	
Sevvanthi	11 July 2022	12 July 2025	
Sivasakthi	16 June 2008	18 December 2009	
Soolam	27 May 2001	22 February 2004	
Sumangali	6 March 2017	13 July 2019	
Sundari	22 February 2021	1 December 2024	
Tamil Selvi	3 June 2019	31 March 2020	
Thalattu	26 April 2021	24 June 2023	
Thamarai	3 November 2014	4 August 2018	
Thangam	29 June 2009	25 January 2013	
Then Nilavu	26 August 2013	3 January 2014	
Thendral	7 December 2009	17 January 2015	
Thirumagal	12 October 2020	22 July 2023	
Thirumathi Selvam	5 November 2007	22 March 2013	
Thyagam	30 January 2012	30 August 2013	
Uravugal	1 June 2009	12 October 2012	
Uthiripookkal	14 November 2011	4 October 2013	
Valli	17 December 2012	14 September 2019	
Vamsam	10 June 2013	18 November 2017	
Vanathai Pola	7 December 2020	17 August 2024	
Vani Rani	21 January 2013	8 December 2018	
Vidhi	6 March 2017	20 January 2018	
Vinodhini	26 May 2025	8 August 2026	

=== Dubbed series ===
Name	First aired	Last aired
Alavudeen	29 September 2019	27 August 2022
Chandrakanta	1996	1997
Devi Adi Parashakti	27 July 2020	13 February 2021
Jai Hanuman	5 June 2016	21 March 2020
Naagini	27 June 2016	21 January 2017
Nethra	6 March 2023	27 August 2023
Pournami	4 February 2019	12 July 2019
Ramayanam	2008	2011
Ramayanam	13 May 2024	27 September 2025
Shirdi Sai Baba	8 January 2018	12 July 2019
Vinayagar	9 October 2017	16 March 2019

=== Reality shows ===
- Kaiyil Oru Kodi (2012-2012)
- MasterChef India – Tamil Season 1 (2021-2021)
- Namma Ooru Hero (2019-2019)
- Nijam (2006-2011)
- Nijangal (2016–2017)
- Natchathira Sangamam (2016)
- Pepsi Ungal Choice
- Sapthaswarangal (1993–2006)
- Savaale Samali (2017–2018)
- Sirippulogam (2012-2012)
- Sun Naam Oruvar (2018–2019)
- Sun Singer (2013–2017)
- Super Challenge (2015–2017)
- Thanga Vettai (2005–2006)
- Thiruvalar Thirumathi (2007)

== List of films ==
=== Telefilms ===
List of films made exclusive for television release.

Films	Year	Ref.
Naanga Romba Busy	2020	
Pulikkuthi Pandi	2021	
Vannakkam Da Mappilei	2021	
Vellai Yaanai	2021	
Tughlaq Durbar	2021	
