= Amarasigamani =

Indian film producer, actor, and writer (1950–2021)

Kalaimamani Amarasigamani
- Born: Amarasigamani Deivasigamani; 12 November 1950
- Died: 21 June 2021 (aged 70)
- Occupations: Actor, poet
- Years active: 1960–2021
- Awards: Kalaimamani Award (2007)

D. Amarasigamani (12 November 1950 – 21 June 2021) was an Indian actor and poet who worked on Tamil films and television serials.

== Career ==
Amarasigamani began his acting career in drama troupes, working with actors such as S. V. Sahasranamam, Komal Swaminathan and V. Gopalakrishnan. He later wrote the dialogue for the Tamil film Mudhalai (Dost Magarmach).

Amarasigamani notably worked on films such as Anniyan (2005), Sivaji (2007) and Evano Oruvan (2007). On television, he made appearances in the shows Sontham, Uravugal and Ponnunjal.

The government of Tamil Nadu honored Amarasigamani with the Kalaimamani award in the 'Sirantha Gunachitra Nadigar' (Best Character Artist) category. He was also awarded the 'Kavimaamani' award (Best Poet) by Bharathy Kalai Kazhagam in Chennai.

== Death ==
He died aged 70 on 21 June 2021, following a cardiac arrest. He had suffered from Parkinson's disease for several years prior to his death. He was survived by his wife Shyamala Devi, three sons and a daughter.

== Awards ==
- 2007: Received title of Kalaimamani Award by the Government of Tamil Nadu, which is the highest state honour in the field of Arts

== Partial filmography ==
=== Films ===
As actor

- Naan Adimai Illai (1986)
- Ayudha Poojai (1995)
- Pagaivan (1997)
- Bharathi (2000)
- Baba (2002)
- Ramanaa (2002)
- Julie Ganapathi (2003)
- Kanavu Meippada Vendum (2004)
- Anniyan (2005)
- Adhu Oru Kana Kaalam (2005)
- Rendu (2006)
- Sivaji (2007)
- Evano Oruvan (2007)
- Guru Sishyan (2010)
- Eththan (2011)
- Sadhurangam (2011)
- Aachariyangal (2012)
- Maanga (2015)
- Killadi (2015)

=== Television ===
- Premi (1998)
- Oru Pennin Kadhai (1998-2000)
- Sontham (1999)
- Take it Easy vazhkai (2001-02)
- sorgam (2003-04)
- Ahalya (2004)
- Nimmathi (2005-2007)
- Ketti Melam (2006-2008)
- Kasthuri (2006)
- Surya (2006)
- Vairanenjam (2007-2009)
- aadajanma (2008-2010(Star Maa))
- Swarna manasu (2008-2010(Asianet))
- Girija M.A. (2007-2008)
- Uravugal (2009-2012)
- Gokulathil Seethai (2014)
- Ponnunjal (2014)
