= Sivasakthi (TV series) =

Indian television series

- Genre: Soap opera
- Written by: Pa. Raghavan
- Screenplay by: Bakhrudeen
- Directed by: S. Sundaramoorthy; R. Balaji Yathav M.A
- Creative director: Sujatha Vijakumar
- Starring: Shamitha Shreekumar; Renuka; Sabitha Anand; Manjari; Poovilangu Mohan; Snekha Nambiar
- Theme music composer: D. Imman (Title Song); Kiran (Background Score)
- Opening theme: "Santhosham Thane Vazhkaiyile"; Shankar Mahadevan and Shweta Mohan (Vocal); Pa. Vijay (Lyrics)
- Country of origin: India
- Original language: Tamil
- No. of seasons: 1
- No. of episodes: 385

Production
- Producer: Sujatha Vijakumar
- Cinematography: Ashok Rajan
- Editor: D. Prem Kumar
- Camera setup: Multi-camera
- Running time: approx. 20-22 minutes per episode
- Production company: Home Movie Makers

Original release
- Network: Sun TV
- Release: 16 June 2008 – 18 December 2009

Sivasakthi is a 2008 Indian Tamil-language soap opera starring Shamitha, Renuka, Sabitha Anand, Viswanath, Shreekumar, Sanjeev, Saakshi Siva, and Poovilangu Mohan. It replaced Lakshmi and it was broadcast on Sun TV on Monday to Friday from 16 June 2008 to 18 December 2009 at 22:00 (IST) for 385 episodes. It was produced by Home Movie Makers Sujatha Vijakumar, director by Balaji Yadav. Shamitha, who plays the lead role, made her Tamil-language debut with the series. Co-actors Shreekumar and Shamitha were revealed to be married.

== Plot ==
It is a story about single mother Sivagami and daughter Shakthi had been leading a happy life, though not doing well financially, life had been smooth for them both. Sivagami had a secret hidden behind her and daughter Sakthi does not know about it. Sakthi had always longed to have a big family like her best friend Parimala. One day Sivagami falls sick and that is when Sivasakthi learns the truth. Truth about her father, and her other four siblings. Sakthi promise her mother to find her siblings and bring them back to her. On her search, she experiences much difficulty. Lost her love life and yet carried on with her search for her siblings.

== Cast ==
=== Main ===
- Shamitha Shreekumar as Shakthi
  - A fourth daughter of Sivagami's, a poor girl, witnessed two murders. Grown up not knowing about her other siblings. Finally Sakthi learns of her siblings and promises her mother to find them. On the search of her siblings, she has lost her love, Venkat. Yet, for the love and desperate to meet her siblings, she continues with her life.
- Renuka / Sabitha Anand as Sivagami
  - A mother of five kids. Has a lovely caring husband, brother-in-law and sister-in-law. She has five children. After her husband dies, she does odd jobs and finally ends up at an orphanage home.
- Shree kumar Ganesh as Kannan (Left)
  - A third son of Sivagami's, a rowdy and for Mukilan, Kannan is everything, because of his dedication. Kannan still remembers his mother and siblings, cries daily thinking about his mother and wondering where his siblings are. He does not know Sakthi is his sister, threatens her for a sim card after Sakti witnessed a murder and the person before dying gave her a sim card. Since then, both Sivagami and Sakthi consider Kannan to be a rowdy. Until Kannan sees Sivagami, he does not know Sakthi is his sister. Upon learning this, Kannan abandons his rowdy life and tells them he is Kannan, but they insult him. On the other hand. Mukilan is annoyed Kannan left him and decides to take revenge on Sakthi.
- Manjari Vinodhini/Sneha Nampiar as Kavitha/Gayathri the first daughter of Sivagami. She misses her mother and believes she has died. She wonders how to find her siblings. She married Saravanan and has a daughter, Divya.
- Vithiya as Vimala/Kanchana
  - A fifth youngest daughter of Sivagami's, she is soft-spoken and fearful. She married Venkat without knowing about his love-life, Sakthi who happens to be her sister.
- Sailatha as Ponni
  - A third daughter of Sivagami's, she is brave.

=== Supporting ===
- Viswanath as Venkat
  - Shakthi's ex-boyfriend and Vithiya's husband.
- Sharvan as Subramani (Shakti's husband)
- Sanjeev as Sevvazhai
- Kannan as Saravanan Gayathri's husband
- Saakshi Siva as Sabapadhi
- Poovilangu Mohan
- Vija Krishnaraj
- Swaminathan as Perumal
- Santhyananth as Nandhagopal
- Umamaheswari as Parimala
  - She is a loving daughter, friendly, and Sakthi's best friend.
- Shanthy Anand as Rajeswari (Parimala's sister)
- Nesan as Akilan (Pooni's husband)
- Ashok as Ashok Kumar (Parimala's husband)
- Barath Guru as Ranjith
- Jekan as Bala Subramaniyum
- Sandha as Shanthi

== Casting ==
The series is a Mystery Family Thriller story. produced by Home Media, that aired on Sun TV. Actress Shamitha landed in lead Female role, who has appeared in Tamil-language films like Pandavar Bhoomi, was selected to portray the lead role of Shakthi, making her Tamil-language debut with the series. Renuka was selected to portray Sivagami. Later Sabitha Anand was replaced role of Sivagami. Other main cast include Shreekumar, Sailatha, Vithiya, and Sneha Nampiar and the supporting cast include Viswanath, Sanjeev, Umamaheswari, Saakshi Siva and Poovilangu Mohan.

== Original soundtrack ==
=== Title song ===
The title song was written by lyricist P. Vijay with vocals by Shankar Mahadevan and Shweta.

=== Soundtrack ===
Tracklist
No.	Title	Lyrics	Singer(s)	Length
1.	"Santhosham Thane Vazhkaiyile (சந்தோசம் தானே வாழ்க்கையிலே)"	P. Vijay	Shankar Mahadevan and Shweta Mohan	3:40

== Awards and nominations ==
Year	Award	Category	Recipient	Role	Result
2010	Sun Kudumbam Awards 2010	Best Actor	Saakshi Sivaa	Sabapathi	Nominated
2010	Sun Kudumbam Awards 2010	Best Brother	Shreekumar	Kannan	Won
2017	Tamil Nadu State Television Awards for 2009	Best Actor Male	Shreekumar	Kannan	Won
2017	Tamil Nadu State Television Awards for 2009	Best Dubbing Artist Male	Vinoth		Won

== See also ==
- List of programs broadcast by Sun TV
