= Putra (film) =

- Poster
- Directed by: V. Umakanth
- Written by: V. Umakanth (dialogue)
- Based on: Em Magan (Tamil) by Thirumurugan
- Produced by: Antony Paul
- Starring: Diganth; Supreetha; Roopasri; Avinash
- Cinematography: Naveen Suvarna
- Edited by: Suresh Urs
- Music by: Songs: Raja Ramesh; Vidyasagar (unc.); Score: Cajetan Dias
- Production company: Rose Productions
- Release date: 14 October 2011
- Running time: 144 minutes
- Country: India
- Language: Kannada

Putra (or Puthra) (transl. Son) is a 2011 Indian Kannada-language family drama film directed by V. Umakanth. A remake of the Tamil film Em Magan (2006), the film stars Diganth, Supreetha, Roopasri and Avinash. The film was released after a two-year delay.

== Cast ==
- Diganth as Krishna
- Supreetha as Thulasi
- Roopasri as Madhu
- Avinash as Narasimha
- Sundar Raj
- Tennis Krishna as Krishna's uncle
- Sudha Belawadi
- M. S. Umesh

== Production ==
The film began production in 2007. Supreetha, who was cast as the main heroine, initially left the film due to date issues and a leg fracture. Shubha Poonja was brought in as her replacement but after a few days of shoot, Supreetha rejoined the film. Malavika was reported to be the film's second heroine, but she was replaced by Roopasri. The film was ready for release at the end of 2010.

== Soundtrack ==
The songs were composed by Raja Ramesh. The songs "College Generation", "Gundu Goli Kanne", and "Badalavaneyu Nirantharavilli" were reused from "Kalluri Generation", "Goligundu Kanu" and "Maatram Ondre" from the original, respectively.

All lyrics are written by Ramnarayan.

Track listing
No.	Title	Music	Singer(s)	Length
1.	"College Generation"	Vidyasagar (unc.)	Badri Prasad, Hemanth	4:40
2.	"Gundu Goli Kanne"	Vidyasagar (unc.)	Badri Prasad, Anuradha Bhat	4:49
3.	"Enayitho Enayitho"	Raja Ramesh	Hemanth	4:24
4.	"Rathanana Padaana"	Raja Ramesh	Vishnu, Shamitha Malnad	5:19
5.	"Aaha Aaha Mutti Bitte - Bit"	Raja Ramesh	Badri Prasad	1:19
6.	"Ninnondige Naa Ninnondige"	Raja Ramesh	Badri Prasad, Anuradha Bhat	2:49
7.	"Badalavaneyu Nirantharavilli"	Vidyasagar (unc.)	Badri Prasad	2:24
8.	"Mella Mella Hoo Vaadavo Ella"	Raja Ramesh	Anirudha, Hiranmayi	4:45
Total length:				30:29

== Reception ==
A critic from Indo-Asian News Service wrote that "Puthra is an ordinary film despite a good story and neat performances from the two lead male actors". A critic from Bangalore Mirror wrote that "Diganthh finally has a good film to his credit that had not originated from the Yograj Bhat camp. Putra is directed by veteran V Umakanth who manages to extract good performances from at least half-a-dozen actors".
