= Muniyandi Vilangial Moonramandu =

- Theatrical release poster
- Directed by: Thirumurugan
- Written by: Bhaskar Sakthi (dialogues)
- Screenplay by: Thirumurugan
- Story by: Thirumurugan
- Produced by: Datho Doraisingam Pillai; Karunamoorthy; Thirumurugan
- Starring: Bharath; Poorna
- Cinematography: Vaidy S
- Edited by: Jeyakumar
- Music by: Vidyasagar
- Production companies: Lotus Five Star; Thiru Pictures
- Distributed by: Ayngaran International
- Release date: 4 July 2008
- Country: India
- Language: Tamil

Muniyandi Vilangyial Moondramandu (transl. Muniyandi, Third Year Zoology) is a 2008 Indian Tamil-language romantic drama film written and directed by Thirumurugan. Bharath, Poorna (in her Tamil debut), Ponvannan, and Vadivelu star in this film. The film was produced by Malaysian-based firm Lotus Five Star in association with Thiru Pictures. The music was composed by Vidyasagar. The film was released on 4 July 2008, and became a box office failure.

== Plot ==
Muniyandi is a third-year undergraduate zoology student and the son of Muthumani, who happens to be the student canteen contractor of the same college. He meets Madhumitha, the demure young daughter of a local bigwig named Ramaiyya, who gives first priority only to the members of his caste. Madhu makes a coquettish play for all of Muni's friends including Sorimuthu Ayyanar, a part-time witch doctor who is also the peon of the college, dressed complete with bells and saffron cloth regalia, but hits it off with him first. Following a heated skirmish in the caste-dominated college elections, the two of them fall in love. Unfortunately, everything goes topsy-turvy when, once Madhu's marriage is arranged, she turns around and says that she was never in love with Muni in the first place. Furious, Muni thrashes her with his slippers and sets fire to her father's coconut grove. Though she never reveals to this incident to anyone, Muni, on the other hand, discovers the secret behind his brother's death. Muni's brother was killed when he tries to help his friend who is in love with a girl of the other caste. Muni participates in college elections to go against Madhu's words. On the day of the nomination, Muni realises that Madhu loves him truly, but she had reverted from her feelings due to the request from his father to save his life. Muni convinces college students from conducting the election in college and puts a stop caste game in college. Ramaiyya and the other caste head were supposed to be killed by Raju (Muni's brother's friend and the old girl's lover), which Muni thwarts. Finally, Muni, with his father's acceptance, returns to Madhu (who was waiting for him near the temple) and unites with her.

== Cast ==
- Bharath as Muniyandi Muthumani
- Poorna as Madhumitha Ramaiyya
- Ponvannan as Muthumani
- Vadivelu as Sorimuthu Ayyanar
- L. Raja as Ramaiyya
- Yugendran as Raju
- Thara
- King Kong
- Bonda Mani
- Yuvashree
- Suja Varunee (Special appearance)
- Rangammal

== Production ==
After the success of Em Magan (2006), director Thirumurugan and actor Bharath collaborated again for this film. The film was shot in Pollachi in December 2007.

== Soundtrack ==
Soundtrack was composed by Vidyasagar and lyrics were written by Vairamuthu.

Song title	Singers
"Imayamalayum" (Remix)	Jayamoorthy, Manicka Vinayagam, Tippu
"Kattipidikkum Karadiya"	Jayamoorthy, Malathi
"Kodaangi Vanthirukken"	Anuradha Sriram, Manicka Vinayagam
"Kombuvitta Kaalayenna"	Tippu
"Potta Kuruviyo"	Haricharan, Mahathi

== Reception ==
A critic from Webdunia wrote the film that made us think about director Thirumurugan and his film. Pavithra Srinivasan of Rediff.com wrote, "The story might be done to death a thousand times but it's the treatment that sets this one apart". Sify said the film is "as tiresome and irritating as watching mega serials continuously for two and-a-half hours".
