= Shanthi Williams =

Indian actress

- Born: 23 September 1958 (age 68); Coimbatore, Madras State (now Tamil Nadu), India
- Occupation: Actress
- Years active: 1970–1980; 1993–present
- Spouse(s): J. Williams (m.1979–died. 2005)
- Children: 4

Shanthi Williams is an Indian film and television actress who has played supporting roles in various Tamil and Malayalam movies and serials.

== Career ==
Williams came into the industry as a child artist at the age of 12. Williams started her acting in 1970 with the film, Vietnam Veedu. She started doing television serials from 1999, playing second lead and supporting roles. She is best known for her negative role as a mother-in-law who despises her daughter-in-law and her family in the serial Metti Oli.

She was awarded the Best Actress in a negative role by director K. Balachander for her performance in Thendral where she played Tamizharasu's mother.

She has acted in many Tamil and Malayalam films as well as serials.

== Personal life ==
Shanthi Williams was born at Coimbatore, Tamil Nadu to Malayali parents from Kerala.Her Father was from Thrissur and Mother from Palakkad. She married a Malayali cameraman J. Williams in 1979. They have 4 children.

== Filmography ==
Year	Name	Role	Language	Notes
1970	Vietnam Veedu		Tamil	Uncredited
1972	Nrithasala		Malayalam	
1973	Masappady Mathupillai		Malayalam	
1974	Nellu		Malayalam	
1974	Chakravakam		Malayalam	
1975	Mucheettukalikkarante Makal		Malayalam	
1975	Akkaldaama		Malayalam	
1975	Kaamam Krodham Moham		Malayalam	
1975	Anuragalu		Telugu	
1976	Madhana Maaligai		Tamil	
1976	Muthu		Malayalam	
1976	Romeo		Malayalam	
1977	Uyarndhavargal		Tamil	
1977	Chakravarthini		Malayalam	
1978	General Chakravarthi		Tamil	
1978	Dil Aur Deewaar		Hindi	
1979	Manthoppu Kiliye	Lakshmi	Tamil	
1980	Panam Penn Pasam		Tamil	
1980	Moodu Pani	Chandru's mother	Tamil	
1980	Nenjathai Killathe	Mala (Viji's sister-in-law)	Tamil	
1980	Pennukku Yar Kaval		Tamil	
1980	Manju Moodalmanju		Malayalam	
1980	Mr. Michael		Malayalam	
1992	Mahan		Malayalam	
1993	Gentleman		Tamil	
1994	Gentle Man Security		Malayalam	
1995	Karuppu Nila		Tamil	
1996	Kizhakku Mugam		Tamil	
1997	Aahaa Enna Porutham	Mangalam	Tamil	
1998	Kaadhale Nimmadhi		Tamil	
1998	Sollamale		Tamil	
1999	Suyamvaram	Pallavan's mother	Tamil	
1999	Jodi	Kannan's mother	Tamil	
2000	Unakkaga Mattum	Mangalam	Tamil	
2000	Vaanavil	Priya's mother	Tamil	
2000	Snegithiye	College Principal	Tamil	
2000	Pennin Manathai Thottu	Mythili	Tamil	
2001	Friends	Padmini's father's friend's wife	Tamil	
2001	Dumm Dumm Dumm		Tamil	
2001	Vaanchinathan		Tamil	
2001	Aandan Adimai		Tamil	
2001	Lovely	Nivetha's mother	Tamil	
2001	Narasimha	Vaanathi's mother	Tamil	
2001	Poovellam Un Vasam		Tamil	
2001	Alli Thanda Vaanam	Kannamma	Tamil	
2001	12B	Shakthi's mother	Tamil	
2001	Manadhai Thirudivittai	Indhu's mother	Tamil	
2002	Roja Kootam	Akash's mother	Tamil	
2003	Kaiyodu Kai	Raja's mother	Tamil	
2003	Parthiban Kanavu	Parthiban's mother	Tamil	
2003	Thirumalai	Anju Mahendran's mother	Tamil	
2003	Nadhi Karaiyinile		Tamil	
2003	Punnagai Poove		Tamil	
2004	Aaytha Ezhuthu	Selvanayagam's wife	Tamil	
2004	Maanasthan		Tamil	
2004	Udhaya		Tamil	
2005	Anniyan	Susheela	Tamil	
2005	Aadum Koothu		Tamil	
2006	Pasa Kiligal		Tamil	
2006	Palunku	Mother Superior	Malayalam	
2006	Yes Your Honour	Ravishankar's mother	Malayalam	
2006	Bhargavacharitham Moonam Khandam	Sophia's mother	Malayalam	
2006	Amirtham		Malayalam	
2007	Oru Ponnu Oru Paiyan		Tamil	
2007	Ammuvagiya Naan	Gowrishankar's mother	Tamil	
2007	Cheena Thaana 001	Governor's wife	Tamil	
2007	Raakilipattu	College principal	Malayalam	
2008	Odum Meghangale		Tamil	
2009	Kannukulle	Gnanaprakasam's wife	Tamil	
2012	Aachariyangal	Vaani	Tamil	
2013	Moondru Per Moondru Kaadhal	Gunasekhar's mother	Tamil	
2013	Jannal Oram	Justin's mother	Tamil	
2013	Climax	Poonkodi's stepmother	Malayalam	
2014	Amma Ammamma		Tamil	
2015	Papanasam	Rani's mother	Tamil	
2019	Naan Avalai Sandhitha Pothu		Tamil	
2021	Ainthu Unarvugal		Tamil	
2023	Rudhran		Tamil	

== Television ==
Year	Title	Role	Channel	Language	Notes
2000–2001	Chithi	Padmavathi	Sun TV	Tamil	
2002	Marumagal		Vijay TV	Tamil	
2002–2005	Metti Oli	Rajam @ Rajamma	Sun TV	Tamil	{
2003	Annamalai		Sun TV	Tamil	
2003	Panneer Pushpangal		Sun TV	Tamil	
2004	Thangamana Purushan		KTV	Tamil	
2004–2007	Tharkappu Kalai Theeratha		Kalaignar TV	Tamil	
2004–2009	Minnukettu	Janaki @ Janakiamma	Surya TV	Malayalam	
2005	Manaivi		Sun TV	Tamil	
2006	Nombarappoovu	Vimala	Asianet	Malayalam	
2006	Raja Rajeshwari		Sun TV	Tamil	
2007	Kanavugal Aayiram		Jaya TV	Tamil	
2007	Arasi	Chandramathi	Sun TV	Tamil	
2008–2009	Kalasam	Nagalakshmi	Sun TV	Tamil	
2008–2009	Vaira Nenjam	Alamelu	Sun TV	Tamil	
2008–2009	Bandham	Thaamirabarani	Sun TV	Tamil	Replaced Kanya
2009	Kalyanam	Shivagaami	Sun TV	Tamil	
2009	Aval oru Minsaram		Kalaignar TV	Tamil	
2009–2011	Thendral	Rukkumani	Sun TV	Tamil	Replaced by K. S. Jayalakshmi
2010	Abhirami		Kalaignar TV	Tamil	
2010	Mythili		Kalaignar TV	Tamil	
2011	Shanthi Nilayam		Jaya TV	Tamil	
2011	Snehakoodu		Surya TV	Malayalam	
2011–2012	Thangam	Avudaiammal	Sun TV	Tamil	
2011–2012	Sivasankari		Sun TV	Tamil	
2011–2012	Uravugal	Mangalam Natarajan	Sun TV; Vasantham TV	Tamil	
2012–2014	Pillai Nila	Savithri	Sun TV	Tamil	
2013–2018	Vani Rani	Angayarkanni	Sun TV	Tamil	
2013–2014	Uravugal Sangamam		Raj TV	Tamil	
2015–2016	Andal Azhagar	Vadivu	Star Vijay	Tamil	
2015–2016	Keladi Kanmani	Bhagyam	Sun TV	Tamil	
2016	Vishwaroopam	Kumudam	Flowers	Malayalam	
2017–2018	Rekka Katti Parakkudhu Manasu	Thayaramma	Zee Tamil	Tamil	
2018 – 2023	Pandiyan Stores	'Pillayaar Paati' Parvathy Muruganandham "Paaru"	Star Vijay	Tamil	
2018–2019	Thenum Vayambum	Mullasserry Bhageerathi	Surya TV	Malayalam	
2019	Azhagu		Sun TV	Tamil	
2019	Kanmani	Tamil Selvi	Sun TV	Tamil	
2019–2022	Chandralekha	Meenakshi	Sun TV	Tamil	Replaced by Priya
2019	Poove Sempoove	Kanthimathi	Kalaignar TV	Tamil	
2019–2020	Rajamagal	Kanchana	Zee Tamil	Tamil	Replaced by Balambika
2020–2022	Senthoora Poove	Rajalakshmi	Star Vijay	Tamil	
2020	Magarasi	Meenakshi	Sun TV	Tamil	Cameo appearance
2022	Meera	Janaki	Colors Tamil	Tamil	
2022–2023	Deivam Thantha Poove	Gandhimati	Zee Tamil	Tamil	
2023–2024	Kaliveedu	Rajeshwari	Surya TV	Malayalam	
2023–2025	Pudhu Vasantham	Rajeshwari	Sun TV	Tamil	Replaced By Eesan Sujatha
2024–2026	Kanmani Anbudan	Rajeshwari	Star Vijay	Tamil	Replaced By J. Lalitha
2025	Meenakshi Sundaram		Kalaignar TV	Tamil	
2026–Present	Bhairavi	Ponnatha	Sun TV	Tamil	
