= Ponnunjal =

Ponnunjal may refer to:

- Ponnunjal (film), a 1973 Indian Tamil-language film
- Ponnunjal (TV series), an Indian Tamil-language soap opera
