= Pillai Nila (TV series) =

Indian TV series

- Logo
- Genre: Soap opera
- Screenplay by: D.K.S. Nimesh (1-124); S.Anand Babu (125-570); A.Jawhar (570-679)
- Directed by: D.K.S. Nimesh (1-120); K.Shiva (121-205); K.Shanmugam (205-399); R.Nandha Kumar (400-542); V.Sadhasivam (543-679)
- Starring: Shamitha Shreekumar; Divya Padmini; Shyam Ganesh; Shreekumar; Neha Menon
- Theme music composer: X. Paulraj
- Opening theme: "Poovinlile Poovinlile"; K. S. Chithra (Vocal); Dr. Krithaya (Lyrics)
- Country of origin: India
- Original language: Tamil
- No. of seasons: 02
- No. of episodes: 679

Production
- Producer: Saregama
- Production locations: Kodaikanal; Ooty; Chennai
- Cinematography: K. S. Udhayashankar
- Editor: A.R Shiva
- Camera setup: Multi-camera
- Running time: approx. 22-29 minutes per episode
- Production company: Saregama

Original release
- Network: Sun TV (2025-present)
- Release: 23 April 2012 – 4 October 2014

Related
- Pondatti Thevai; Chandralekha

Pillai Nila is a 2012-2014 Tamil-language soap opera that aired on Sun TV. The show premiered on 23 April 2012. It aired Monday through Saturday. The show starred Shamitha Shreekumar, Divya Padmini, Shyam Ganesh, Shreekumar, Neha Menon and Shanthi Williams. It was replaced by Chandralekha (Tamil serial) which was replaced by Ilakkiya (Tamil serial).

The show was produced by Saregama and directed by V. Sadhashivam, with screenplay by A. Jawahar. Pillai Nila is the fight between two good friends, Hema and Kokila, for Baby Nila. The show last aired 4 October 2014 and ended with 679 episodes. The show was re-telecastied from 5 May 2025 at 10:00AM (Indian Standard Time).

== Plot ==
Kokila and Hema are best friends who are thick as thieves. Unfortunately they break up due to their love over Nila. While Kokila hails from a rich family, Hema is lower in status. Kokila and Hema's brother Santhosh are in love. Kokila gets pregnant with his child and they try to elope but Santhosh is killed by Kokila's relatives. After his funeral, Hema breaks her friendship with Kokila as she caused her brother's death. Years roll by and Hema is married to Shekar, and they have two children, Nila and Nithin. Kokila is married to Ramkumar who is sweet but his mother is one evil lady. As the two families live in Chennai, Kokila and Hema eventually meet but Hema is still angry. Nila eventually suspects that she is not the daughter to Shekar and Hema and try to find her real parents with her brother Nithin and the son of the house owner Illango's help. Kokila finds out Nila is her daughter with Santhosh, who was told that the child died during childbirth and a clash occurs between Hema and Koila. Ramkumar and Shekar try to meet up to solve the issue with Ramkumar wanting Nila for Kokila's sake and Shekar not wanting to give Nila as he loves her dearly as a daughter even though really she is his niece.

Though this is the main line of story, a number of minor characters and stories associated with Nila are intermingled in the series. Nila stays with Kokila and Ramkumar and loves them like her parents and the couple reciprocates it. Suspicion creeps in the mind of Nila when she overhears the conversation between Sharadha and Ramkumar. Nila mistakenly accuses Ramkumar guilty of an affair with Sharada and being the father of Hari, who is actually her nephew.

== Cast ==
=== Main cast ===
- Neha Menon as Nila, Kokila's and Santosh's biological daughter, Hema's adopted daughter/Angel
- Shamitha Shreekumar as Kokila, Nila's biological mother
- Divya Padmini as Hema, Kokila's friend and Nila's adopted mother/aunt

=== Additional cast ===
- Master Sanjith as Nithin (Kutty/Shiva/Arun) as Hema and Sekhar's son/Kudikkulam Kumaran
- Master Abi Dilip as Elango/Michael
- Shyam Ganesh as Ram Kumar, Kokila's husband/Nila's adopted father
- Shreekumar as Sekhar, Hema's husband and Nila's adopted father/uncle
- Raaghav as Santhosh, Kokila's ex-lover, Hema's brother & Nila's biological father
- Sabitha Anand as Ramkumar's biological mother
- Shanthi Williams as Savithri, Kokila and Thangadurai's aunt
- Rajyalakshmi as Neelaveni, Ram Kumar's step mother
- Ramji as Mahesh
- Murali Kumar as Raja
- Nalini as Kalyani, Sekhar's sister
- Vietnam Veedu Sundaram as Neelaveni's uncle
- OAK Sundar as Thangadurai, Kokila's brother
- Rajashekar as Hema's and Santosh's father
- Vijay Krishnaraj as Sekhar's brother-in-law
- Sheela as a doctor
- J. Lalitha as Nancy, Home caretaker
- Rajini Ravi as Rajini Ravi
- S. Palaniappan (Lollu Sabha Palani) as Guruvaiyar/Govindhan
- Azhagu as Sengodan (Kattu Thatha)/Thilothamma's father
- Kathadi Ramamurthy as temple priest
- Prema Priya as Govindhan's wife
- Sangeetha Balan/Jayasundari as Panchavarnam "Varnam"
- Sindhu as Elango's mother/Hema's house owner
- Rekha Suresh as Thangadurai's wife
- Surindhar as Sathish
- Gayathri as Raji, Sathish's wife
- Baboos as Kada Ravi
- K. R. Rangamma as Rangamma
- Devi Krupa as Thara
- V. Vishwanath as Vinod
- R. Narasimman
- G. Sumathi as Gowri
- Jayakumar as a police inspector
- Tamil Selvi as Selvi
- Jayalakshmi as Thilothamma
- Nivarshini Divya as Chandhini
- Kicha as a worker at Thangadurai's guesthouse
- Gowthami Vembunathan as Kanaga

== See also ==
- List of programs broadcast by Sun TV
