= Thalai Ezhuthu =

- Directed by: Ethiraj
- Written by: Ethiraj (dialogues)
- Screenplay by: Ethiraj
- Story by: Richard Raj
- Produced by: Richard Raj
- Starring: Richard Raj; Pooja Gandhi
- Cinematography: Dominic Savio
- Edited by: J. N. Harsha
- Music by: Godwin
- Production company: JAK Film Productions
- Release date: 10 July 2009
- Running time: 105 minutes
- Country: India
- Language: Tamil

Thalai Ezhuthu (transl. Ill Fate) is a 2009 Tamil language thriller film directed by Ethiraj. The film stars Richard Raj and Pooja Gandhi, with Guinness Pakru, Meera Krishnan, Bala Singh and Saakshi Siva playing supporting roles. The film, produced by Richard Raj, was released on 10 July 2009.

== Plot ==
Raj (Richard Raj) is a software engineer who lives with his widow mother (Meera Krishnan). He spent his childhood in a home for disabled children, where his mother worked for a living thus he has sympathy for the handicapped. After completing a degree in software engineering, he got offers to work in multinational companies but he decided to stay in India and works for a small company. Raj invents a device that can help the disabled people overcome their physical defects and conveniently complete their daily routines. After the presentation of his project, Raj gets death threats from a corrupt politician who wants to appropriate his project. In the meantime, Raj meets Pooja (Pooja Gandhi) and they fall in love with each other.

Raj then meets with an accident and was rushed to the hospital. In a serious condition, the doctors save his life, however, Raj finds himself in a wheelchair and is now unable to speak at all. Meanwhile, his mother has a heart attack and was admitted to the same hospital, Raj needs money to save his mother. When Pooja met Raj by accident, she forcefully admits him to a mental hospital and Raj is tortured by the hospital staff Pachai (Bala Singh). Later, Pooja steals Raj's research and tries to sell it to potential buyers.

Deputy Superintendent of Police Karthik (Saakshi Siva) is looking for Pooja, who escaped from a mental hospital a few months ago. Pooja turns out to be a person with mental health issues who can do anything for money. During her college life, she fell in love with a college mate but he didn't reciprocate her love because she wasn't rich. Therefore, Pooja suffered from an inferiority complex and her only goal in life was to become rich so she wanted to marry a rich groom. However, her parents fixed her wedding with a middle-class groom and her dream to become rich fell apart. Pooja then found herself in a mental hospital and managed to escape from there. It was only then that she decided to seduce Raj and paid a drug addict to cause Raj a serious accident.

Finally, Pooja sold his project to a buyer but the software asks for a password. Pooja in panic goes back to the mental hospital and she threatens to kill Raj if he doesn't give her the password. At that time, DSP Karthik arrives and shoots Pooja to save Raj.

Two months later, Raj receives widespread acclaims for his work. The film ends with Raj in a wheelchair celebrating his birthday in a home for disabled children along with his mother in tears and the mentally ill Pooja.

== Cast ==
- Richard Raj as Raj
- Pooja Gandhi as Pooja
- Guinness Pakru as Kirthik
- Meera Krishnan as Raj's mother
- Bala Singh as Pachai
- Saakshi Siva as DSP Karthik
- Kannan Ponnaiya
- R. R. Rediyar
- Ragavesh
- Daniel Baskar
- Srilatha
- Viji Kannan as Pooja's mother
- Mithran
- A. C. Murali Mohan as Shiva
- Babu as Henchman
- Mangalam Gurukkal as Gurukkal

== Production ==
Richard Raj, a NRI and an owner of a restaurant in New Zealand, produced and played an important role in the film while actress Pooja Gandhi signed to play the female lead role. The film was inspired by a physically challenged software engineer who visited Richard Raj's restaurant and it was shot at a location near Bhopal. Richard Raj's father Ethiraj, a scriptwriter and theatre person, directed the film. Dominic Savio who has been working for Sun TV cranked the camera while Godwin had scored music.

== Soundtrack ==
Thalai Ezhuthu

Soundtrack album by Godwin
- Released: 2009
- Recorded: 2009
- Genre: Feature film soundtrack
- Length: 17:32
- Producer: Godwin

The film score and the soundtrack were composed by Godwin. The soundtrack, released in 2009, features 6 tracks with lyrics written by Priyan and Jagan.

Track	Song	Singer(s)	Duration
1	"Ethaniyo Kanavugal" (sad)	Haricharan	1:38
2	"Ethaniyo Kanavugal" (happy)	Haricharan	2:47
3	"Mesmerism Seium"	Ramya NSK	2:57
4	"Muthal Murai"	Ramya NSK	2:11
5	"Oru Parvaiyile"	Kathik, Lavanya	4:36
6	"Paruva Kaatru"	Ranjith	3:23
