= Devathai (2013 TV series) =

Indian Tamil-language soap opera

- தேவதை
- Genre: Soap opera
- Written by: Pa. Raghavan
- Screenplay by: J.K
- Directed by: P. Niravi Pandiyan
- Starring: Subhatra; Bhagya; T. Durairaj; Shobana
- Theme music composer: Balabharathi
- Opening theme: Engirithu Vanthalo Intha Devathai... Srinivas (Vocals); Kadhalmadhi (Lyrics)
- Country of origin: India
- Original language: Tamil
- No. of seasons: 1
- No. of episodes: 924

Production
- Producer: Radha Krishnasamy
- Cinematography: M.Raja
- Editors: K. Udayakumar; M. Premkumar
- Production company: Abhinaya Creations

Original release
- Network: Sun TV
- Release: 1 July 2013 – 20 August 2016

Related
- Vellai Thamarai (TV series)

Devathai is an Indian Tamil-language soap opera that aired on Sun TV from 1 July 2013 to 20 August 2016 at 12:00PM IST for 924 episodes. It starred Subhadra, Bhagya, T. Durairaj and Shobana.

The show is produced by Abhinaya Creations Radha Krishnamurthy, director by P. Niravi pandiyan and Pa. Raghavan has written the story of Devathai, who is also taking care of its screenplay. The title track was composed by Balabharathi. The show stopped by Channel because of its low TRP ratings.

== Plot ==
Devathai revolves around a woman who decides to make a fresh start in her happy life but her life journey is riddled with many challenges and complications that force her to hide her true identity.

== Cast ==
- Subhadra as AnnaPoorani alias Poorani
- Bhagya.
- Senu
- Nithya Ravindran
- Poorni as Nandhini
- T. Durairaj
- Shobana
- V. K. R. Raghunath
- T Durairaj
- R T Neason
- Havis
- Jeevitha
- Deepa
- Delhi Ganesh (Former cast)
- VJ Mounika
- Swetha
- Swetha Nair
- Sai Madhavi

== Original soundtrack ==
=== Title song ===
Famous music director of many films with number of hit songs, Balabharathi has composed the music for this serial. Kadhalmadhi has written the lyrics for his tune which is sung by popular playback singer Srinivas.

=== Soundtrack ===
Tracklist
No.	Title	Lyrics	Singer(s)	Length
1.	"Engirunthu Vanthalo Intha Devathai (எங்கிருந்து வந்தாலோ இந்த தேவதை) (From where comes this angel)"	Kadhalmadhi	Srinivas	3:20

== Production ==
The series was directed by P. Niravi pandiyan. It was produced by Abhinaya Creations, along with the production crew of 2002-2016 Sun TV Serials Mangalyam, Adugiran Kannan, Theerka Sumangali, Chellamadi Nee Enakku, Thirupaavai, Anupallavi and Vellai Thamarai.

The show written and screenplay by Pa. Raghavan and Dialogues are written by Thavamani Vaseekaran. JK Acts as the creative head. As far as the technical department is concerned, camera work for this serial is well handled by M. Raja, editing by the duo K. Udayakumar and M. Premkumar. Sound recording responsibility is with Nellai D Rajkumar and J Senthilkumar.

== See also ==
- List of programs broadcast by Sun TV
