= Nijangal (Indian TV series) =

- Genre: Reality; Drama; Justice
- Based on: Racha Banda
- Written by: Ramalingam
- Directed by: Mani Sridhar
- Creative director: V.Murali Raman
- Presented by: Khushboo Sundar
- Theme music composer: Hari
- Country of origin: India
- Original language: Tamil
- No. of seasons: 1
- No. of episodes: 218

Production
- Producer: Vaidehi Ramamurthy
- Cinematography: Raghav
- Editors: M.S.Thiyagarajan; M.N.Perumal; Anand; Senthil
- Camera setup: Multi-camera
- Running time: approx. 40-45 minutes per episode
- Production companies: Vision Time India Private Limited; Plan V Productions

Original release
- Network: Sun TV; Sun News
- Release: 24 October 2016 – 4 March 2017

Nijangal (transl. Realities) is a 2016-2017 Tamil-language reality-justice show about real-life situations. It aired every Monday to Saturday at 12:30PM (IST) on Sun TV and it was re-telecasted every Monday to Saturday at 10:00PM (IST) on Sun News, This reality-justice show was aired from 24 October 2016 to 4 March 2017 with 218 episodes. The Show host by Khushboo Sundar. This reality-justice show revolves around real life situations and they try to come up with a solution for the same on the channel. This reality-justice show was produced by Vision Time India Private Limited and Plan V Productions, and it was directed by Mani Sridhar. This reality-justice show was the replacement of previous successful serial Ponnunjal, which was also produced by Vision Time India Private Limited and Plan V Productions, It was aired from 2 September 2013 to 22 October 2016 with 940 episodes. This reality-justice show was replaced by the next serial Mahalakshmi, which was produced by Vision Time India Private Limited, It was aired from 6 March 2017 to 14 December 2019 with 805 episodes.

== List of episodes ==
Some of the topics discussed on the show are:

Episode	Topics Discussed	Telecast date
27	My inlaws are alcoholic addict - I was married in my Teen	24 November 2016
28	I left my Kids 28 Years before for an Illegal affair	25 November 2016
29	40 Year old Marries a 13 Year Girl and Tortures	26 November 2016
44	Tamil Nadu Boxing Association is Hopeless (Thulasi Tharumalingam)	15 December 2016
45	Kushboo To Find Actor Dhanush Real Parents	16 December 2016
51	Jallikattu Special - With Hiphop Tamizha	23 December 2016
60	Wife gets Parted from husband of inlaws	3 January 2017
69	Women biker Travels for 12 Days - Shares Experience	16 January 2017
71	I Least care about my Parents	18 January 2017
74	Jallikattu Special with Smile settai and Kollywood Stars	21 January 2017
75	I married an Old Man Respecting my Parent's Desire	24 January 2017
76	Farmers Problem and Reason Behind Suicide	25 January 2017
77	Salem Vinupriya Suicide - Police demanded corruption	26 January 2017
78	Does Ghost Really Exist	27 January 2017
80	Most Talented and Lovable Couple	30 January 2017
81	Story of Every Kidnap Victims	31 January 2017
82	Women Cremators - Even death cant stop them	1 February 2017
83	Women Bike Racers	2 February 2017
84	Biggest Joint Family	3 February 2017
85	Cancer Survivors and How they Resisted it	4 February 2017
86	Tragedies Faced by Indian Gulf Workers	6 February 2017
87	My Wife is in Coma for more than 6 months	7 February 2017
88	I was brutally beaten on roads by my in-laws	8 February 2017
89	ChennaiFlood Victims and NGO's - A True Story	9 February 2017
90	My Journey from Jail to Gentle Man	10 February 2017
91	Astrologer's Prediction are Challenged	11 February 2017
92	My Aloof 7 days at Suicide Point - Unbelievable Survivor	13 February 2017
93	How we met our Life partner - Valentine's Day Spl	14 February 2017
94	Few Warm Hands of Society	15 February 2017
95	Modern Organic Farmers !!! "Going back to roots"	16 February 2017
96	My Husband's Illegal Affairs	17 February 2017
97	Worst Form of Slavery's Existence	18 February 2017
98	Funeral Ceremony for the Unknown	20 February 2017
99	Property and Alcohol are the threat to our family	21 February 2017
100	My Birthday is World's Idli Day	22 February 2017
101	Women's Life after being Cheated by their Boyfriend	23 February 2017
102	Auto Raja a living Legend of Social Service	24 February 2017
103	My Journey as a Transgender	25 February 2017
104	Village People's Unity to win Illness	27 February 2017
105	My Wife is not Concerned about the Family	28 February 2017
106	We lost our beloved ones and are still in search	1 March 2017
107	Reunion of Chellaiyee	2 March 2017
108	Don't Waste Donate Waste	3 March 2017
109	I am a Proud Home Maker & Death and Disease really aren't connected	4 March 2017

== See also ==
- List of programs broadcast by Sun TV
