= Peranbu (TV series) =

2021 Indian television series

- Genre: Drama
- Screenplay by: Shakthi Jagan; Siva Raman (Dialogues)
- Directed by: Bashir; RK Swami; RGM; Durga Saravanan; N. Priyan
- Starring: Vaishnavi Arulmozhi; Shamitha Shreekumar; Vijay Venkatesan
- Opening theme: "Anbe Anbe... Enge Neeyenge"
- Composer: Sunganth Jo
- Country of origin: India
- Original language: Tamil
- No. of seasons: 2
- No. of episodes: 597

Production
- Executive producers: Arivunidhi. M (Zee Tamil); Mukilan (Sagasra Productions)
- Producers: Bala Murugan K (2021–2022); J Kishorenath (2022); N Priyan (2022–2023)
- Editors: Magathi Aji, Lakshmi Murugesan
- Camera setup: Multi-camera
- Running time: 22 minutes (approx.)
- Production companies: Sunday Productions (2021–2022); JFL Productions (2022); Sagasra Productions (2022–2023)

Original release
- Network: Zee Tamil
- Release: 13 December 2021 – 11 November 2023

Peranbu (transl. Great love) is a 2021-2023 Indian Tamil-language television drama that aired on Zee Tamil and streams on ZEE5. It stars Vaishnavi Arulmozhi, her first time as a female lead, along with Shamitha Shreekumar and Vijay Venkatesan. It premiered on 13 December 2021 and ended on 11 November 2023 with 597 episodes.

It was launched along with Deivam Thandha Poove in the noon slot. Later it shifted to an evening slot and delivering excellent ratings. It received critical acclaim for its acting performances, with Vimal Venkatesan winning Favorite Hero, Vaishnavi Arulmozhi winning Favorite Heroine, Shamitha Shreekumar and Vaishnavi Arulmozhi winning Best Maamiyar and Marumgal and winning Favorite Serial at the Zee Tamil Kudumbam Viruthugal 2022.

== Plot ==
Vanathi marries Karthik under unexpected circumstances. Her mother-in-law realizes the discomfort between the newlyweds due to their contrasting personalities, and helps the couple become closer.

== Cast ==
=== Main ===
- Vaishnavi Arulmozhi as in a dual roles
  - as Vanathi Karthik
    - An uneducated but respectful woman who was adopted from a child adopt centre by Amutha and Sundaram, has they don't have the child, later Amutha had a baby girl, so Amutha dislikes Vanathi and made her a house servant. She was Karthik's wife; Amutha and Sundaram's adoptive daughter; Aarthi's elder adopted sister (2021-Jun.2023) (Dead)
  - as Shanmathi: Vanathi's look alike (July.2023- 11.Nov. 2023)
- Shamitha Shreekumar as Raja Rajeshwari
  - A wealthy and bold lady, Karthik, Jeeva and Swetha's mother, who wishes her future daughter-in-law to be kind and caring, and thus rejects Aarthi and chooses Vanathi for Karthik as his wife. She holds a special affection to Vanathi as they are both orphans, and she sees similarities in how they both grew up.
- Vijay Venkatesan as Karthikeyan (Karthik)
  - A business man and puppet of his mother; Vanathi's husband; Aarthi's ex-boyfriend; Rajeshwari's son. He originally likes Aarthi, but later learns of her evil nature and distances himself from her. He married Aarthi's stepsister Vanathi per his mother's wish and likes her but finds it hard to accept her due to their differing lifestyles.

=== Recurring ===
- Lakshmi as Amudha: Vanathi's adoptive mother; Aarthi's mother; Sundaram's wife
- Akshitha Ashok (2021–2022) / Sreenidhi Sudarshan (2022–2023) as Aarthi Jeeva: Jeeva's wife; Vanathi's stepsister; Amutha and Sundaram's daughter
- Pranav Mohanan as Jeeva: Aarthi's husband; Rajeswari's second son; Karthik's younger brother; Swetha's elder brother
- Sivakumar as Sundaram: Amutha's husband; Vanathi's adoptive father; Aarthi's father
- Ravi Shankar as Rajeshwari's husband; Karthik, Jeeva and Swetha's father
- Saira Banu as Swetha: Rajeswari's daughter; Karthik's younger sister; Raja's wife
- Vasudeva Krish Madhusudhan as Raja: Shwetha's husband and a lawyer
- Nivetha Ravi as Abi: Aarthi's friend; Karthik's employee
- Divyapriya Sivam as Maanasa: Jeeva’s ex-girlfriend
- VJ Mounika as Anu: Karthik's one-sided lover
- Sabitha Anand as Krishnaveni: Vanathi's biological mother
- Jeevitha as Vasantha Devi: Amutha's sidekick and Vanathi's fake mother
- unknown as Bavani: Shanmathi's sister-in-law
- K. S. Jayalakshmi as Bavani's grandmother
- Saivam Ravi as Shanmathi's father
- unknown as Shanmathi one-sided love interest
- unknown as Shanmathi's mother

== Special episodes ==
There was a two-and-half-hour special episode of Karthik & Vanathi marriage titled "MEGA Thirumana Vaibhavam" on 20 March 2022.

== Adaptations ==
Language	Title	Original release	Network(s)	Last aired	Notes
Tamil	Peranbu பேரன்பு	13 December 2021	Zee Tamil	11 November 2023	Original
Malayalam	Madhuranombarakattu മധുരനൊമ്പരക്കാറ്റ്	17 June 2024	Zee Keralam	Ongoing	Remake

== Awards and nominations ==
Year	Award	Category	Recipient	Result
Zee Tamil Kudumbam Viruthugal 2022	Favorite Serial	Peranbu	TV series	Won
Zee Tamil Kudumbam Viruthugal 2022	Favorite Hero	Vijay Venkatesan	Karthikeyan	Won
Zee Tamil Kudumbam Viruthugal 2022	Favorite Heroine	Vaishnavi Arulmozhi	Vanathi Karthik	Won
Zee Tamil Kudumbam Viruthugal 2022	Best Maamiyar and Marumgal	Shamitha Shreekumar & Vaishnavi Arulmozhi	Raja Rajeshwari & Vanathi	Won
