= Shamitha Shreekumar =

Indian television/film actress (born 1980)

- Born: Bhavani; 6 August 1979 (age 47); Chennai, Tamil Nadu, India
- Occupations: Actress; Model; Dancer; TV presenter
- Years active: 1994 - present
- Spouse: Shreekumar
- Children: 1
- Relatives: Ganesh (father-in-law)

Shamitha Shreekumar (Tamil: ஷமிதா ஸ்ரீகுமார்) is an Indian actress who predominantly works in South Indian Tamil television soap operas. Her only film appearance in the 2001 film Pandavar Bhoomi received critical performance for her acting alongside Ranjith before she gained more popularity as a serial actress in Tamil Nadu. She received praise from the audience for her positive roles in TV dramas Sivasakthi and Ponnunjal and also for her negative role in Vijay TV serial, Mouna Ragam.

== Career ==
Originally born as Bhavani, Shamitha first became acquainted with director Cheran when attending the premiers show of his Porkkaalam (1997), in which Shamitha's sister Rajeswari had played a pivotal role. He subsequently cast her in his next film with Prashanth titled Vinnodum Mugilodum under the stagename of Shivani, and as a result, she quit her psychology degree in 2000 and prepared herself for an acting career. The film did not materialise, and thus she changed her stagename to Shamitha and was cast as the lead actress by Cheran in his village drama Pandavar Bhoomi (2001). She played dual roles in the film as Jeeva and Thamarai, and appeared alongside Arunkumar in the lead role. She won positive reviews for her portrayal, with a reviewer from Rediff.com noting "she carves a niche in the hearts of the viewers, not as a pompous heroine but as the-girl-next-door." The film performed well commercially and later received the second prize award in the 2001 Tamil Nadu State Film Awards for Best Tamil film.

Despite garnering attention with Pandavar Bhoomi, Shamitha was not able to receive further opportunities to act in films and eventually started to act in television serials in the late 2000s. She made her television serial debut through Sun TV, where she played the lead role Sakthi alongside Shreekumar in the 2008 mystery TV series Sivasakthi.

Shamitha also played lead roles in few soap operas, including Ponnunjal, a TV serial which aired on Sun TV from 2013 to 2016, and Pillai Nila, which was telecast through Sun TV from 2012 to 2014. After playing protagonists in her previous serials, she went onto play a villainous role in the television soap opera Mouna Ragam, which was telecast through Star Vijay Television until 2020.

== Personal life ==
Television Serial actor Shreekumar Ganesh and Shamitha Shreekumar got married on 28 April 2009. They both had met during their breakthrough serial Sivasakthi. They both have a daughter named Rayna Shreekumar.

== Filmography ==
Films

Year	Film	Role	Ref.
2001	Pandavar Bhoomi	Jeeva / Thamarai	

Television

Year	Serial	Role	Television	Ref.
2008–2009	Sivasakthi	Sivasakthi	Sun TV	
2010–2012	Vasantham	Nandhini	Sun TV	
2012–2014	Pillai Nila	Kokila	Sun TV	
2012–2014	Puguntha Veedu	Radha	Zee Tamil	
2014–2016	Ponnunjal	Nandhini	Sun TV	
2017–2020	Mouna Ragam	Kadhambari	Vijay TV	.
2019–2020	Poove Sempoove	Uma Maheswari	Kalaignar TV	
2020–2021	Thirumagal	Aishwarya	Sun TV	
2021–2023	Peranbu	Raja Rajeshwari	Zee Tamil	
2023	Ponni	Jayalakshmi	Star Vijay	
2026	Poongodi	Akhilandeswari	Sun TV	
2026–present	Samanthi	Tamilarasi	Zee Tamil	
