= Karthigai Pengal =

- Genre: Soap opera
- Written by: Thirumurugan
- Screenplay by: Baskar Shakthi
- Directed by: Kavitha Bharathy
- Creative director: Thirumurugan
- Starring: Shruti; Dr. Sharmila; Bhanu Chander
- Theme music composer: Sanjeev Rathan
- Opening theme: "Siru Siru Kuruvigal" (Vocals); Aanad; Janaki Iyer; Arivumathi (Lyrics)
- Country of origin: India
- Original language: Tamil
- No. of seasons: 1
- No. of episodes: 266

Production
- Producers: Saroja Muniyandi; Jyothi Thirumurugan
- Cinematography: Sarath K.Chandar; D.Ashok Devaraj
- Editors: C.Ashok; Ramesh; J.Somuvel
- Running time: approx. 20-22 minutes per episode
- Production company: Thiru Pictures

Original release
- Network: Sun TV
- Release: 30 July 2012 – 23 August 2013

Karthigai Pengal is an Indian Tamil-language soap opera that aired on Sun TV from 30 July 2012 to 23 August 2013> It aired Monday through Friday for 266 episodes. It portrays the story of a woman who braves many problems in life, but always works with others to make sure that everyone around her is happy.

The show starred Shruti, Dr. Sharmila, Bhanu Chander, Nalini, Divya Kumar, Anandhi and Ramesh among others. It was produced by Thiru Pictures Thirumurugan. It was also aired in Sri Lanka Tamil channel on Shakthi TV.

== Plot ==
This serial showed the story of girls in a hostel, with Charu as the main character. It made a deep impact and gave new confidence to women who are staying alone for different life reasons. It told them they can face their challenges with support from other good people. Charu and other hostel girls' life as depicted in this serial worked a proof for this.

Charu, a divorced and independent woman, turns her home into a hostel and hosts 3 new girls. The first girl to join the hostel is Aarthi. Aarthi tells Charu that she has come to Chennai for an examination. But in reality, she hails from Thanjavur and had eloped from her home to unite with her lover Mohan. Aarthi's father and brother are on the hunt for the lovers, as Mohan is a driver and hails from a lower caste. Mohan stays elsewhere with his friend, while Aarthi stays in Charu's hostel. Next, Shenbaga joins the hostel. Shenbaga's mother is a single-parent and is always over protective. Initially, she wanted her to stay in her cousin brother's house, but Shenbaga's aunt, Rukku does not allow it, and Shenbaga stays in the hostel and works in an office. The last girl to enter is Beula, a talkative and bubbly girl. While Aarthi is distant, Beula falls for Prem and kind man, while Prem falls for Shenbaga. Shenbaga goes to her uncle's home to help out with the chores as Rukku breaks her leg, and her cousin Akash falls for her, but Shenbaga is not fond of it. Aarthi elopes and the truth comes out. Meanwhile, Charu's daughter who is married is being pressured by her husband and her family for car and money, and she turns to Charu who is helpless. Charu's husband a useless lawyer and their son Suriya are simply a burden for Charu. Meanwhile, Aarthi's father and brother track the couple to Nellur and murder Mohan and his two friends, leaving Aarthi a widow. Aarthi returns to Chennai. Meanwhile, Aakash attempts suicide because of Shenbaga, and Prem leaves after Shenbaga shouts at him. Beula gets killed due to some reasons. In the end, Charu gets Aarthi married to Suriya, and Shenbaga marries someone of her mother's choice and settles abroad. Suriya and Aarthi name their daughter Beula. All is well.

== Cast ==
- Shruti as Charulatha a.k.a. Charu
- Dr. Sharmila
- Bhanu Chander
- Nalini
- Divya Kumar
- Anandhi Ajay as Aarthi
- Ramesh
- Sri vidhya
- Shwetha Subramanian as Buela
- Kartic Krishna
- Vijay
- Deepa Shankar

== See also ==
- List of programs broadcast by Sun TV
- List of TV shows aired on Sun TV (India)
