= Kalasam (TV series) =

- Genre: Soap opera
- Created by: Kutty Padmini
- Written by: Kutty Padmini
- Screenplay by: Devibala
- Directed by: M.Vannan; A. Abdullah; M.R. Senthil Kumar
- Creative director: Ramya Krishnan
- Starring: Ramya Krishnan; Sudha Chandran; Kutty Padmini; T. S. B. K. Moulee; Devan; Saakshi Siva
- Theme music composer: D. Imman (Title Song); G. V. Kalai Kathir (Background Score)
- Opening theme: "Thaiyara Thaiya"; Thabu Shankar (Lyrics)
- Country of origin: India
- Original language: Tamil
- No. of seasons: 1
- No. of episodes: 234

Production
- Producers: Vaidhegi Ramamurthy; Kirtana Fanning
- Editor: Thanjai R. Sankar
- Camera setup: Multi-camera
- Running time: approx. 20-22 minutes per episode
- Production companies: Vision Time; RDV Staarlight Works

Original release
- Network: Sun TV
- Release: 14 July 2008 – 26 June 2009

Kalasam (Tamil: கலசம்) is a soap opera that aired Monday to Friday on Sun TV from 14 July 2008 to 26 June 2009 totaling 234 episodes.

The show stars Ramya Krishnan in dual roles as a mother and daughter, with Sudha Chandran, Kutty Padmini, T. S. B. K. Moulee, Devan and Saakshi Siva. It was produced by Vision Time and RDV Staarlight Works and directed by Senthil Kumar and A. Abdulla. Its Creative Head was Ramya Krishnan.

== Plot ==
The story follows an independent woman named Neelambari (Ramya Krishnan), who fights for women's rights, and a rich woman named Chandramathi (Sudha Chandran), who has very arrogant.

An air force officer named Ranjini (Ramya Krishnan) is an adopted child whose birth mother is Neelambari (Ramya Krishnan). Neelambari and Chandramathi (Sudha Chandran) were very close friends when they were young. Neelambari came from a wealthy family, and Chandramathi worked under her. However, the friendship didn't last long, out of jealousy Chandramathi betrayed Neelambari by taking away all of her assets. Neelambari's husband murdered Naalambari and ran away from the country.

Twenty-five years later, Chandramathi is shocked to see a woman who looks like Neelambari (Neelambari's daughter Ranjini). Still haunted by what she did she brought Ranjini under her control. Many of her plots fail until one-day Chandramthi's manages to get Ranjini arrested and jailed.

A lawyer reads a newspaper article about how Ranjini got arrested and, having been fond of her, Neelambari decides to help her. The story begins here and has many twists and turns, including the return of Neelambari, who after 25 years comes to take revenge on Chandramthi.

In the end, Neelambari forgives Chandramathi, and the drama ends.

== Cast ==
=== Main cast ===
- Ramya Krishnan in a dual role as:
  - Neelambari (Vasundhara)
  - Ranjini
- Sudha Chandran as Chandramathi, the main antagonist
- Kutty Padmini as Sangeetha, school teacher
- T. S. B. K. Moulee as Advocate Satyamoorthy

=== Recurring cast ===
- Srithika as Madhumita, Neelambari's adopted daughter
- Devan as Ramprasad
- Saakshi Siva as Gopi
- Sanjeev Venkat as Selvam
- Kuyili as Sharadha, Ranjini's adopted mother
- Vijay Krishnaraj as Shanmugam
- Manokar as Karthi, Ranjini's brother
- Srithar
- Kumaresan
- Vanaja
- Iswarya as Uma, Sangeetha's daughter
- Jayalakshmi
- Vasuvi as Meena
- Rajesh
- Shanthi Williams as Nagalakshmi, Chandramathi's mother
- S. N. Lakshmi as Neelambari and Ranjini's grandmother
- Vietnam Veedu Sundaram

== See also ==
- List of programs broadcast by Sun TV
