= Thennilavu (TV series) =

- Genre: Soap opera Comedy; Thriller
- Written by: Thirumurugan
- Directed by: E.Vikkramathithan; K.Sulaimaan
- Creative director: N.Shakilla
- Starring: Thirumurugan; Sarvan Rajesh; Delhi Ganesh; Annamalai Palaniappan; Neema; Siva Ranjani
- Theme music composer: Sanjeev Rathan
- Opening theme: "Melam Kotti"; Yugabharathi (Lyrics)
- Country of origin: India
- Original language: Tamil
- No. of seasons: 1
- No. of episodes: 90

Production
- Producer: Thirumurugan
- Editor: Singai V.Raju
- Camera setup: Multi-camera
- Running time: approx. 20-22 minutes per episode
- Production companies: Thiru Pictures, Vision Time India Pvt Ltd

Original release
- Network: Sun TV
- Release: 26 August 2013 – 3 January 2014

Thennilavu (Tamil: தேனிலவு) (transl. Honeymoon) is an Indian-Tamil soap opera that was aired on Sun TV. The show premiered on 26 August 2013 and aired during weekdays. The show starred Thirumurugan, Sarvan Rajesh, Delhi Ganesh, Neema and Siva Ranjani. The show was aired again in YouTube from 29 March 2021. The show is produced by Thiru Pictures Thirumurugan and directed by E.Vikkramathithan.

== Plot ==
Thennilavu is set in a holiday cottage in Kodiakanal following four couples' honeymoon routine. The four couples include a couple who always plan to murder the other, a couple who are stopped getting closer by their family members, a couple who suffers from Sleepwalking and an old couple who recently got remarried.

The show begins with Ram and Revathy going for their honeymoon with a hired vehicle and the driver. The driver gives unwanted glances at Revathy who informs Ram, but Ram dismisses it. It is soon revealed that the driver has been set by Ram to kill Revathy so he can unite with his wealthy girlfriend. Unbeknowest to Ram, Revathy too has an ex, with whom she plans to kill Ram and together they can elope. They stay in a room in the resort. Next is Suresh aka Suchu and Vino, a brahmin couple. Suchu is innocent and a cowards, while Vino is the complete opposite. Vino has an illness of somanabulism and dresses up as a Malayali and beats Suchu every night, but the next morning she forgets it. Suchu thus distances himself from her, and this causes Vino to feel sad. They rent another room next to Ram's. Next comes Kalyan and Meena. Surprisingly, they come in busload of their family members for their honeymoon, which also includes Kalyan's asthma grandfather. Both family members don't get along well with the couples sisters fighting frequently and their respective husbands, Tirupathi and Alex, fighting but unite on several occasions to drink. A while later, an elderly couple who got recently married, Mr and Mrs Rajashekar arrive. Ram and Revathy attempt to kill each other. Vino's night tantrums continue, which causes Suchu to call his sister-in-law, Vino's sister for advice, which Vino learns and causes friction. The large group of families almost cause issues everyday and every night, preventing Kalyan and Meena from having some privacy. One morning, Suchu finds the driver dead on the resorts doorstep. Rajashekar is revealed to be a retired police and leads and investigation. The group is held for a few days and they all live to go by their lifestyle in Chennai. When the driver's body from Kodaikanal mortuary goes missing, everyone is called back again. At this point, Meena and Kalyan are separated by their families. In the end, the driver's mysterious murder is uncovered revealing that his twin brother killed him. Kalyan and Meena run away causing their families to realise their mistakes and all unite. Vino and Suchu unite after Vino's treatment. Ram and Revathy realise they love each other and unite. Rajashekar calls all of them to his house for lunch and everything happens here and he puts senses into each individual. Agalya (Ram's girlfriend) and Revathy's boyfriend realise their mistake, and the two end up together.

== Cast ==
- Thirumurugan/Sarvan Rajesh as Kalyanam
- Neema as Meena
- Delhi Ganesh as Rajasekhar
- Muthu Kumara Swamy as Ram
- Siva Ranjani as Revathi
- Annamalai Palaniappan as Suchu
- Sangeetha Shetty as Vino
- Deepa Nethran
- Kannan as Alex
- Aravamudhan Venkatesan as Tirupati
- Ramjee S as the doctor
- Rekha Padmanaban as Agalya

== See also ==
- List of programs broadcast by Sun TV
