= Saakshi Siva =

Indian film actor

- Born: Venkatasivaramaya; 6 February 1972 (age 54); Chennai, Tamil Nadu, India
- Occupation: Actor
- Years active: 1995-present
- Spouse: V. Rajyalakshmi
- Children: 2
- Parent: Sakshi Ranga Rao (father)
- Website: http://www.saakshisivaa.com

Saakshi Siva is an Indian actor who acts in Tamil and Telugu language television and films. He is best known for his role in the serial Anandham.

== Career ==
Siva made his debut with the Tamil-Telugu bilingual serial Sabatham. He then starred in AVM Productions's Tamil serial Oru Pennin Kadhai before acting in its Telugu remake Oka Stree Katha, which garned him many offers. He received his breakthrough with the Tamil serial Anandham in the role of AC 'Encounter Dorai'. His role was so popular that he was addressed by that name. He also gained recognition for his negative role of Andavar Appu in AVM Productions's serial Sorgam.

He acted in Telugu serials like Akka Mogudu, Mounaraagam and No.1 Kodalu.

== Personal life ==
Siva is the second son of Telugu film actor Sakshi Ranga Rao. He married Rajyalakshmi in 1997 in Chennai, when he was still working a regular job. Siva is also an accomplished badminton player who has won state-level championships.

On 1 July 2019, he underwent head surgery after facing an accident on the sets of the Tamil-Telugu bilingual serial Lakshmi Stores.

== Filmography ==
Year	Film	Role	Language	Notes
1995	Vajram	Chakri's friend	Telugu	
1996	Neti Savithri	Auto driver	Telugu	
1999	Kadhalar Dhinam	Palanquin carrier	Tamil	Cameo appearance in the song "Roja Roja"
2008	Thozha		Tamil	
2008	Saroja		Tamil	Cameo appearance in the song "Aaja Meri Soniye"
2009	Kadhal Kadhai	Police Inspector	Tamil	
2009	Thalai Ezhuthu	DSP Karthik	Tamil	
2014	Haider	Lt. Nagarajan	Hindi	Uncredited
2017	Yevanavan		Tamil	
2018	Bharat Ane Nenu	Bharath's uncle	Telugu	
2019	Guna 369	Gita's father	Telugu	
2024	Hide N Seek		Telugu	

== Television ==
Year	Title	Role	Channel	Language
	Sabatham			Tamil; Telugu
1999	Oru Pennin Kadhai		Sun TV	Tamil
1998–1999	Vaazhnthu Kaattukiren	Appu	Sun TV	Tamil
1999–2000	Kokila Enge Pogiral		Sun TV	Tamil
2000	Oka Stree Katha		Gemini TV	Telugu
2000–2001	Janani		Sun TV	Tamil
2001–2003	Pavithra Bandam		Gemini TV	Telugu
2001–2003	Nambikkai	Chitti Babu	Sun TV	Tamil
2002–2003	Aasai	Inspector	Sun TV	Tamil
2003–2006	Sorgam	Aandavar Appu	Sun TV	Tamil
2003–2006	Akka	MD	Gemini TV	Telugu
2003–2006	Tharkappu Kalai Theeratha		Sun TV	Tamil
2005	Kanavarukaaga		Sun TV	Tamil
2005–2006	Ahalya		Sun TV	Tamil
2005–2009	Anandham	AC Durai	Sun TV	Tamil
2006–2008	Lakshmi		Sun TV	Tamil
2006–2007	Kana Kaanum Kaalangal	Vineeth's father	Vijay TV	Tamil
2006–2010	Kasthuri		Sun TV	Tamil
2007–2008	Vennelamma		Gemini TV	Telugu
2008	Kanden Seethaiyai		STAR Vijay	Tamil
2008	Simran Thirai		Jaya TV	Tamil
	Priyadarshini		Zee Telugu	Telugu
2008–2009	Namma Kudumbam	Raja	Kalaignar TV	Tamil
2008–2009	Sathileelavathi	AC Murali	Kalaignar TV	Tamil
2008–2009	Kalasam	Gopi	Sun TV	Tamil
2008–2009	Sivasakthi	Sabhapathi	Sun TV	Tamil
2009	Kalyanam		Sun TV	Tamil
2009–2013	Chellamey	Vadamalai	Sun TV	Tamil
2009–	Dhayam		Kalaignar TV	Tamil
2010–2012	Pasupu Kumkuma	Rajashekar	Zee Telugu	Telugu
2011	Kalavari Kodallu		Zee Telugu	Telugu
2011–2012	Shanthi Nilayam		Jaya TV	Tamil
2012–2013	Amudha Oru Aacharyakuri		Kalaignar TV	Tamil
2013–2016	Mahabharatham	Vidura	Vijay TV	Tamil
2013–2014	Chellakili		Sun TV	Tamil
2013–2014	Agni Paravai		Vijay TV	Tamil
2014–2019	Chandralekha	Ashok Kumar	Sun TV	Tamil
2014–2015	Oru Kai Osai		Zee Tamil	Tamil
2016	Vamsam	Balu	Sun TV	Tamil
2018–2019	Azhagiya Tamil Magal		Zee Tamil	Tamil
2018–2019	Kante Koothurne Kanali		Star Maa	Telugu
2018–2020	Akka Mogudu	Raghuram	Gemini TV	Telugu
2018–2021	Mounaraagam	Seenayya	Star Maa	Telugu
2019	Chandrakumari	Shivaneshan	Sun TV	Tamil
2019–2020	Lakshmi Stores	Raju	Sun TV	Tamil
2020	No.1 Kodalu	Jagannadham	Zee Telugu	Telugu
2021	Pudhu Pudhu Arthangal	Mahesh Adhiyaman	Zee Tamil	Tamil
2022–2023	Kannana Kanne	Kishore / Dhanashekaran	Sun TV	Tamil
2023–2024	Seetha Raman	Rajasekar	Zee Tamil	Tamil
2023–present	Kalisundam Raa		ETV Telugu	Telugu
2023–2026	Ilakkiya	SSK	Sun TV	Tamil
2024	Pachapudavakari	Auditor/Meenakshi staunch Devoteee	Polimer TV	Tamil
2024–2025	Veetuku Veedu Vaasapadi	Vishwanathan	Vijay TV	Tamil
2024	Valliyin Velan	Rathinavel Pandiyan	Zee Tamil	Tamil
2025–2026	Rudhra		Kalaignar TV	Tamil
