= Ponnunjal (TV series) =

Indian Tamil-language television series

- Genre: Soap opera
- Written by: S.Maruthu Shankar; Selva Vadivel; S. Ashok Kumar
- Screenplay by: R.Dhivya Dinesh; C.U Arulselvan
- Directed by: Thai Selvam (Episode 1-53); R.C Raganathan (Episode 54-61); A Jawahar; (Episode 62-167): M.K Arundharaja (Episode 168-500); R.Ganesh (Episode 501-723); S.Ashok Neelakathan (Episode 724-834); K.Venpa Karthesian (Episode 835-940)
- Creative director: R.Dhivya Dinesh
- Starring: Abitha; Shamitha; Vishwa; Manjari; Sumangali; Jayarekha; Vanaja; Manjula; Vanitha
- Theme music composer: Hari Krishna
- Opening theme: "Vaanam Boomi"; Priya Hemesh (Vocals); Yugabharathi (Lyrics)
- Country of origin: India
- Original language: Tamil
- No. of seasons: 4
- No. of episodes: 940

Production
- Producer: Vaidehi Ramamurthy
- Cinematography: P. Chella Pandiyan
- Editors: M.S.Thiyagarajan, Manikandan Ravi; M.N.Perumal; C.Prabakaran
- Running time: approx. 20–22 minutes per episode
- Production companies: Vision Time India Private Limited; Plan V Productions

Original release
- Network: Sun TV
- Release: 2 September 2013 – 22 October 2016

Ponnunjal is an Indian Tamil-language soap opera that aired on Sun TV from 2 September 2013 to 22 October 2016 for 940 episodes. It starred Shamitha, Vishwa, Manjula Parithala, Vanitha Hariharan, Shyam, Adhavan and Krithika Laddu.

This serial reunited Rajkanth and Vanaja who had starred together in Sun TV's Metti Oli (2002–2005) and Kalaignar's Deepangal (2008–2009). This serial was produced by Vision Time India Private Limited, and Plan V Productions.

This serial was the spin off of the previous serial Thiyagam which was aired from 30 January 2012 to 31 August 2013 for 400 episodes, and This serial was replaced by a reality-justice show Nijangal which was also produced by Vision Time India Private Limited, and Plan V Productions and it was aired from 24 October 2016 to 4 March 2017 for 218 episodes.

== Synopsis ==
Ponnunjal is the story of two sisters, Nandhini (Abitha/Shamitha Shreekumar) and Priya (Manjula Parithala), who both face new lives after marriage. Nandhini married Vishwa and Priya married Varun Adhavan. Both Nandhini face multiple marital challenges. The serial revolves around how they solve those issues and live their lives.

== Cast ==
=== Main cast ===
- Abitha / Shamitha Shreekumar as Nandhini Vishwa
- Vishwa as Vishwa
- Vanaja as Malathi Sundar
- Rajkanth as Sundar
- Asha Nair / Vandhana / Krithika Laddu as Akilandeshwari (Akila)(Main Antagonist) (Vishwa's second wife)
- Vanitha Hariharan as Keerthana Arun
- Manjula Parithala as Priya Varun
- Shyam as Arun
- Adhavan as Varun
- Gayathri Yuvraaj / Hema Rajkumar as Ramyapriya (Protagonist turned Antagonist)
- Shyam Ganesh as Shridhar
- Manjari ad Rathidevi (Antagonist)

=== Recurring cast ===
- Shamily Sukumar as Revathi Mahesh (1-814)
- Guhan Shanmugam as Mahesh (110-760)
- Vicky Krish as Karthik (896-939) (Dead)(Antagonist)
- Naresh Eswar as Umesh(Antagonist)
- K. S. Jayalakshmi as Krishnaveni, Sundar's Mother (1-514)
- Rajasekhar as Ranganathan, Nandhini's Father (1-894)
- Abhilash as Prasanth
- Aravesh as Arjun
- Sumangali as Amsavalli Ranganathan Nandhini's Mother (1-940)
- Shyam Ganesh as Shridhar
- Vandhana as Akilandeswarai
- Jayarekha as Maragatham, Vishwa's Mother (10-840)
- Super Good Kannan as Aarumugam (Rathi's Husband)
- B.R. Elavarasan as Maharaja (Mahesh and Vijay’s Father)
- Sujatha Panju as Vijayalakshmi Navaneethkrishnan, Arun's mother (754-816) (Dead)
- C. Ranganathan as Navaneethkrishnan, Arun's father (755-900)
- Geetha Saraswathi as Varun's Mother (690-940)
- Harsha Nair as Revathi (110-728) (Replaced by Shamily)
- Suhasini as Nandhini's Work Assistant (199-730)
- Balambika as Maheswari(814-864)
- Bhaskar as WhatsApp Vadivel Akhila's Assistant (680-802)
- Krithika Laddu as Akhila (645-825)
- Nivisha as Uma
- Gayathri Yuvaraj/Hema Rajkumar as Ramya Priya (791-924)
- Geetha Sathish as (Satish Mom)
- Yuvashree as Nirmala Devi (791-894)
- Kalyanji as Kalyan
- Satish Kumar as Satish, Police Inspector, Varun's best friend (690-940)
- Ashwin as Shanmugam
- Bambai babu as Rajaraman (Vinoth's Father)
- Swetha as (Nandhini younger sister) Revathi (1-120)
- J.Lalitha as Adhi Lakshmi (Vinoth Mom)
- Vishwanath as Vinodhan
- Sudha as Sudha
- Abitha as Nandhini Vishwa
- Santhana Bharathi as Vishwa's Father (Dead)
- Senthilnathan as Meenakshi's Husband
- S.Sureshwar as Suresh
- Gowthami Vembunathan as Meenakshi
- Sindhu Shyam as Shamilly
- Amarasigamani as Mahesh's Father
- Deepika as Saraswathy
- Jayanth as Thulasi's Father
- Baby Monna as Durga Devi
- Aravind as Aravind
- Shri Vidhya as Anjali (Antagonist)
- Shanthi Ganesh as Durga Devu
- Shrijith as Narayanan

== Original soundtrack ==
=== Title song ===
The title song was composed by music director Hari, with lyrics written by Yugabharathi. It was sung by Priya Himesh.

=== Soundtrack ===
Tracklist
No.	Title	Lyrics	Singer(s)	Length
1.	"Vaanam Boomi Penne Yavum Nithan (வானம் பூமி பெண்ணே யாவும் நீதான்)"	Yugabharathi	Priya Himesh	2:50

== See also ==
- List of programs broadcast by Sun TV
