= Em Magan =

2006 Tamil-language film by Thirumurugan

- DVD cover
- Directed by: Thirumurugan
- Written by: Bhaskar Sakthi (dialogue)
- Screenplay by: Thirumurugan
- Story by: Thirumurugan
- Produced by: T. G. Thyagarajan; Selvi Thyagarajan
- Starring: Bharath; Gopika; Nassar; Vadivelu; Saranya Ponvannan; Gajala
- Cinematography: Sevilo Raja
- Edited by: Jeyakumar
- Music by: Vidyasagar
- Production company: Sathya Jyothi Films
- Distributed by: Sathya Movies
- Release date: 7 September 2006
- Country: India
- Language: Tamil

Em Magan (transl. My son) is a 2006 Indian Tamil-language family drama film written and directed by Thirumurugan. Bharath, Gopika, and Nassar played the lead roles, while Vadivelu, Saranya Ponvannan, and Gajala appeared in supporting roles. The music was composed by Vidyasagar with cinematography by Sevilo Raja and editing by Jeyakumar. Upon release on 7 September 2006, the film met with positive critical reception and became a commercial success. It was remade in Kannada as Putra (2011).

== Plot ==
Thirumalai owns a provision store in Karaikudi and lives with his family consisting of his wife Selvi, wife's younger brother 'Karupatti' Ayyakannu, son Krishna, daughter Vanitha and mother. Thirumalai is very strict, short-tempered, and is referred as Emdan by his relatives. Krishna studies poultry science in a nearby college and also assists his father in managing the store. Krishnan worries about his father's repeated vehement behaviour towards him.

Divya is Krishna's classmate and is also the daughter of the auditor, Balasubramanian who manages Thirumalai's accounts. Divya proposes to Krishnan, who does not reciprocate. He tells her that he loves his maternal uncle Natarajan's daughter Janani. 12 years ago Thirumalai had asked a loan from Selvi's family to develop his shop, which was refused due to their financial condition. Then, in a festival in temple, Thirumalai slaps Selvi in front of both families for a petty reason, to insult her brothers. This leads to a tussle, and Krishna's family left that temple then. Since then enmity prevails between Thirumalai and his in-laws’ family. Krishnan lives with the hope that the two families will reunite someday, paving the way for his wedding.

Thirumalai's father-in-law Chellakannu is on his deathbed and his mother-in-law visit's Thirumalai's family, asking them to come to see her husband before he passes away. Thirumalai refuses and sends her back. The next day he leaves early to Madurai and Selvi and Krishna use his scooter to visit Chellakannu. Thirumalai returns halfway and a lot of confusion ensues, but Selvi and Krishna confuse him by going to Kunnakudi Murugan Temple and escape his punishment. The next night, Chellakannu passes away and the two families come to talking terms, making a truce to the enmity during the condolence. Krishnan feels excited upon waiting to meet Janani after so many years. Janani also reciprocates the same feeling towards Krishnan, and both love each other. One day, Krishnan is tempted to kiss Janani when there is a power cut. However, the power comes suddenly, and the entire family spots Krishnan kissing Janani.

Both Thirumalai and Natarajan get furious upon seeing this incident. A clash erupts between Thirumalai and Natarajan by blaming each other's child for the incident. Thirumalai beats up Krishnan and takes his family back home. However, Janani secretly hides in the car boot and comes along with them to Krishnan's house. Seeing this, Thirumalai gets even more furious and sends both Krishnan and Janani out of the home.

Krishnan, Janani and Ayyakannu meet Balasubramanian, and request to help the former find a job as he has now completed his college degree with distinction. Krishnan successfully secures a job in a poultry farm in Udumalaipettai with the help of Balasubramanian. Krishna marries Janani and she gave birth to a baby boy. Krishna works hard, his career progresses well, and his lifestyle improves. One day, Thirumalai needs the signature of his son Krishnan as he wanted to sell a property and goes to meet Krishnan. Thirumalai feels happy upon seeing his son in a good status but returns without expressing his happiness because of ego, but on the other hand, Natarajan meets Krishnan after their child is born and realises that he sincerely loves and takes care of Janani, unlike Thirumalai and Krishnan reunites with his maternal uncle happily.

Krishnan comes to meet Thirumalai with an alliance to be seen for his sister. An emotional conversation happens between the duo where the former expresses his feelings. Then Balasubramanian arranges engagement of Divya with the person who she loves now. In the end, Thirumalai overcomes his ego and expresses his happiness upon seeing his son's growth and finally reunites with him. The movie ends showing both the family members of Krishnan and Janani leading a joyful life together and the movie gives a happy ending.

== Cast ==
- Bharath as Krishna
- Nassar as Thirumalai a.k.a. Em-Ton
- Gopika as Janani
- Vadivelu as Karupatti Ayyakannu
- Saranya Ponvannan as Selvi Thirumalai
- Gajala as Divya
- Shanmugarajan as Natarajan
- Rajyalakshmi as Savithri
- Ennatha Kannaiya as Chellakannu
- Ravi Prakash as Auditor Balasubramaniam
- Kadhal Kandhas as Ramadurai
- Krupa as Vanitha

== Production ==
This was the debut venture of television director Thirumurugan in cinema who made the successful series Metti Oli.

== Soundtrack ==
The soundtrack was composed by Vidyasagar. The audio was launched on 11 August 2006.

Song title	Singers	Lyrics
"Kalluri Generation"	Vijay Yesudas, Timmy	Na. Muthukumar
"Unnoduthaan Ini"	Tippu, Subhiksha	Bhaskar Sakthi
"Purinchiducha Purinchiducha"	Stephen Devassy, George Peter	P. Vijay
"Goligundu Kanu"	Karthik, Kalyani Nair	Yugabharathi
"Maatram Ondre"	Madhu Balakrishnan	Bhaskar Sakthi
"Varaaru Vaararu"	Chinna Ponnu, Mohan, Murali, Chandran	Kabilan

== Release ==
The film was initially titled Emdan Magan, however the title was shortened to Em Magan to exploit the Tamil Nadu Government's rule of entertainment tax exemption for films with Tamil titles. The film released on 7 September 2006 and became a commercial success.

=== Critical reception ===
Sify wrote, "Thirumurugan has extracted spell-binding performance from his lead actors and supporting cast. [..] At a time where many movies seem to speak from their wallets, here is one that speaks from the heart.".

S. R. Ashok Kumar of The Hindu wrote, "Director Thirumurugan weaves through emotions and sentiments which form the base of the story. [..] Thirumurugan, directing his first film, has shown that he can handle family drama quite well. He has a tight script and the scenes are arranged well leading to the climax. It is touching to find the son showing concern for the father in spite of the humiliation heaped on him. Such subtle touches show much thought has gone into the film. And the viewers are sure to relate to the scenes that are so down-to-earth."

Lajjavathi of Kalki praised Thirumurugan for making a realistic family drama while appreciating the acting of star cast.

Cinesouth wrote "If only the second half had been as fabulous of the first half, ‘Em Magan’ would have been a super film".

== Awards ==
Filmfare Awards South

- Filmfare Award for Best Supporting Actress – Tamil – Saranya

Tamil Nadu State Film Awards

- Best Director – Thirumurugan
- Best Supporting Actor – Nassar
- Best Supporting Actress – Saranya
