= Kalyana Veedu =

Indian television soap opera

- Kalyanaveedu
- Genre: Soap opera
- Screenplay by: Thirumurugan
- Story by: Thirumurugan; Dialogues; Muthulakshmi Aarumugathamizhan
- Directed by: Thirumurugan
- Creative director: Thirumurugan
- Starring: Thirumurugan; Spoorty Gowda; Kanniga Ravi; Anjana k.r; Sree Priya; Gopi; Benze; Dona Sankar; Ankitha batt; Sangavi; Pop Suresh; Ravi Raj; Munish raj; Jayanthi; Theni Sathyabhama; T.S.k.Moulee; R.Sundharajan; Sampath; Sathya; Hema Srikanth; Meenakshi; Aruna Devi; Kannan
- Theme music composer: Sanjeev Rathin
- Opening theme: "Uravellam Vazhthi Padave"; Hema; Mahalingam (vocals); Ramesh Vaithiya (lyrics)
- Country of origin: India
- Original language: Tamil
- No. of seasons: 1
- No. of episodes: 684

Production
- Producer: Jothi Thirumurugan
- Cinematography: Sarath Chandran
- Editors: Manikandan Ravi, Prem
- Camera setup: Multi-camera
- Running time: 20–22 minutes
- Production company: Thiru Pictures

Original release
- Network: Sun TV
- Release: 16 April 2018 – 13 November 2020

Kalyana Veedu (transl. Marriage house) is a 2018-2020 Indian Tamil-language soap opera directed by Thirumurugan. The show stars Thirumurugan, Kannika Ravi, Spoorty Gowda, R. Sundarrajan, Mouli, Anjana, Sree Priya, Gopi, Benze, Dona Shanker, and Ankitha Bhat. Repeat airing of the show started on Sun TV from 27 March 2023.

== Synopsis ==
Gopi, a sales representative and a part-time singer at an orchestra, goes through various trials and tribulations to ensure the well-being of his family. After a roller-coaster ride, Gopi finally register marriages Surya. In pursuit of searching job, Gopi meets a Manikkavasan who unbeknownst to Gopi had married the wife of Kathiresan. Manikkavasan has made Gopi as his adopted son (as it makes him the brother of Surya whom he married). The interesting twist is Gopi had only registered his marriage with Surya but not tied the mangal sutra (which means he is married and not married).

Gopi krishnan Mutthaiah @ Gopi is the only son of Mutthaiah & Sivagami and is residing in Delhi. He is a sales representative and a part-time singer in an orchestra. He has 3 younger sisters, Anusya Raman, Ramya Manoharan and Savitha Pichaimani. He lives in old-delhi, in a slum area in a small house with his mother, grandmother Sigappi and the 2 younger sisters. Anusya is married to Raman, has a daughter Archana Raman and stays close to their house. Gopi is friends with Nandhu, the brother of Shwetha Suman who is also a singer along with Gopi. Shwetha has a daughter Prathiksha Suman, and raises her alone as her husband had gone missing for a long time. Shwetha has a crush on Gopi and Nandhu too has an idea of getting them married for a secured life for Shwetha.

Ramya’s marriage is set to be arranged with Manoharan Periyasamy @ Manohar, the son of Sivagami’s cousin brother. Manoharan Periyasamy @ Manohara along with his father Periyasamy, younger sister Revathi Periyasamy, mother Kala Periyasamy and Kala’s sister Shakunthala Perumal, come to Delhi to meet Ramya. Ramya and Manohar fall in love at first sight but Kala and Shakunthala do not like the family that much. Nevertheless their marriage is arranged. Meanwhile, Raman has an affair with another woman named Suganthi. When Anusya learns of this, she refuses to give divorce. Thus, Raman brings in a rowdy named Rathinavel to terrorize Gopi’s family. Rathinavel however, develops a liking for Anusya. Manohar hails from Thiruvaiyaru and the whole family go there for Ramya’s wedding. In Thiruvaiyaru, a young and beautiful girl named Surya Gopi Krishnan is Manohar’s neighbor. Surya Gopi Krishnan stays with her father Kathiresan and younger sister Roja Selvanraja. Kathiresan hates his daughters and he considers women to be a burden, after his experience with his wife, Kalarani, the girls’ mother runs away years ago. Surya loves her father but Kathiresan hates her. He even disrupts Surya’s wedding with prospective grooms citing that she might run away like her mother. Roja is a money-minded person and is independent unlike Surya, who respects her father. Surya has recurring dreams of a man, Gopi in this case, where she is chased and killed by this unknown man. When she sees Gopi in Thiruvaiyaru, it is a comic relief.

Meanwhile, Savitha gets addicted to drug after befriending a hooligan named Jithu it adds problems to the family. To escape Rathinavel and save Savitha from Jithu, Gopi and his family escape with Nandhu’s help, not before breaking Jithu’s legs. Since Kala and Sakunthala hates them, Manoharan helps Gopi and his family secretly and makes them stay in a large shelter called Chatram for the time being, which is right behind Kathiresan’s house and beside Manohar’s house. Meanwhile, after getting fooled by Gopi and his family, a fueled Rathinavel comes to Thiruvaiyaru. He stays in Manohar’s house, terrorizing them. Learning of the same after witnessing Rathinavel in Manohar’s house, Gopi tricks Rathinavel into believing that he is in Delhi. The gang leave but lies to Kala and the family that they would be staying in Thanjavur. Grabbing this opportunity, Manohar makes Kala and Sakunthala to cook for Gopi and his family as Ramya too meets her family. In a turn of events, Rathinavel, Suganthi and Raman are arrested. Gopi helps Rathinavel’s wife and daughter and the problem gets solved.

Surya too meets Gopi and both fall for each other. Roja meanwhile, falls for her boss Raja who is actually a prospective groom for Surya. Kathiresan changes his attitude towards Surya. Due to circumstances, Surya agrees to marry Raja but is not interested as she loves Gopi. To avoid problems, Gopi’s family move to a new house. There, Savitha’s marriage is arranged with a police constable, Pichaimuthu, whose family is also a distant relative for Gopi. Pichaimuthu’s family consist of Father Parthasaray, mother Parvathy Parthasaray @ Parvath, elder sister Padmavathy Kannan @ Pattu, Padmavathy’s daughter Pavithra Kannan. Padma desires to get her daughter to marry Pichai, a common custom in Tamil traditions but both refuse. Padmavathy’s husband is working overseas. Gopi goes to Singapore to earn for Savitha’s marriage. But he gets cheated in Singapore and ends up working in a factory like a slave. Gopi realizes that many people there were cheated by the agents. Once, Shewtha comes to the factory to sing and meets Gopi. She helps Gopi and a few other individuals return to India. It turns out that a man Gopi met in the factory, Kannan, is Padma’s husband. Savitha’s marriage with Pichumani happens. Sivagami wants Gopi to marry Surya but due to circumstances, Gopi has agreed to marry Shewtha in Singapore. After many events, which brings back Surya’s mother, Gopi’s father’s second family, marriage of all youngsters occur on the same day, with Shewtha reuniting with her husband Suman, Surya and Gopi uniting.

== Cast ==
=== Main ===
- Thirumurugan as Gopi Krishnan alias Gopi- Surya husband, Sivagami and Muthaiah's son, Anushya, Ramya, Savitha brother also Kalaivani, Manmadhan
- Spoorthy Gowda (2018-2019) → Kannika Ravi (2020) as Surya Gopikrishnan - Roja's elder sister, Gopi wife, Kathiresan and Selvarani daughter

=== Supporting cast ===
- R. Sundarrajan as Kathiresan - Surya and Roja father, Manikkavasam friend
- T. S. B. K. Mouli as Manikkavasam - Gopi adopted father, Kathiresan friend, Selvarani adopted brother
- Anjana K R as Swetha Suman - Suman wife, Gopi's best friend, Prathiksha mother, Nandakumar sister
- Sree Priya as Roja Selvanraja - Raja's wife, Surya's younger sister, Kathiresan and Selvarani daughter.
- Gopi as Selvanraja " Raja", Roja's husband, Surya ex fiancée, Gopi's friend
- Benze as Anushya - Gopi Sister, Sivagami and muthaiah daughter, Savitha, Ramya sister, Archana mother, Raman ex-wife, Surya sister in law.
- Dona Shanker as Ramya Manohar - Anushya, Savitha sister, Sivagami and muthaiah daughter, Manohar wife, Kala daughter in law, Revathi sister in law
- Ankitha Bhat as Savitha Pichaimani - Pichaimani wife, Mutthaiah and Sivagami daughter, Gopi sister; anushya, Ramya sister and Padmavathi's daughter in law
- Pop Suresh as Manohar, Periyaswamy and Kala son, Ramya husband, Revathi brother
- Hema Srikanth as Kala, Periyaswamy's wife, Manohar & Revathi's mother, Ramya'mother-in-law, Sakunthala's sister
- Sathya as Sumandan "Suman", Swetha husband, Prathiksha father, Nandakumar brother in law.
- Munish Raja as Samantham, Anushya husband, Kalaivani ex love interest.
- Ravi Raj as Pichaimani, Parvathy son, Padmavathi's brother, Savitha husband, Kannan and Gopi brother in law.
- Jeyanthi as Sivagami Mutthaiah, mutthaiah wife, Gopi mother: Anshaya, Ramya, Savitha mother, Mutthaiah wife, Periyaswamy sister, Kala sister in law
- Bhagyalakshmi as Selvarani, Manikam's wife
- Sampath as Nandhakumar, Swetha's brother, Gopi's friend
- Smaleen Monica as Sulochana, Swetha friend, Nandakumar Wife
- Aishwarya Ramsai as Archana Raman, Anushya and Raman's daughter
- Prathiksha as Prathiksha Suman, Swetha and Suman's daughter
- Jayaraman as Periyasamy, Kala's husband
- Aishwarya (2018) → Episode 420 Seema (2019–20) as Revathi Periyasamy, Manoharan's sister
- Geetha (2018) → Episode 420 Jeyashree (2019-2020) as Sakunthala Perumal, Kala's younger sister, Perumal's wife
- Radhika as Kavitha, Suganthi's assistant
- Meenatchi as Parvathi Parthasarathy, Piachaimani's mother
- Arunadevi as Padmavathi Kannan, Pichaimani's sister
- as Kannan, Pichaimani's uncle, Padmavathi's husband
- Punitha Balakrishnan (2018) → Episode 420 Priya Rathnakumar (2019-2020) as Pavithra Kannan, Pichaimani's niece, Padmavathi's daughter
- Bavithran as Jithu, a womaniser who desires Savitha. Died in serial
- Saranya as Kausalya, Kathiresan's neighbour
- Kannan as Shekar, Gopi's friend.
- Yuvan Pattison as Bharath, Roja's friend
- Muthu Kumara Swamy as Raman, Anushya ex-husband
- Ishitha (2018) → Geethanjali (2019-2020) as Suganthi, Raman 2nd Wife
- Kartic Krishna as Singapore Subramani
- Palaniappan as Selvam
- Sangeetha as Selva Rani (Cameo)
- Arunkumar Padmanabhan as Balakondaya (Cameo)

== Soundtrack ==
Track list
No.	Title	Lyrics	Singer(s)	Length
1.	"Uravellam (உறவெல்லாம்) Title Song"	Ramesh Vaithya	Mahalingam	4:30
2.	"Manmatha Malarkalil (மன்மத மலர்களில்)"	Manmadhan	Manmadhan

== Controversy ==
In September 2019, there was a complaint against the content of Kalyana Veedu following which the telecaster Sun TV was fined Rs 250,000 by the Broadcast Content Complaints Council. This was in reference to one of the episodes aired in May where one of the female characters named Roja hires a criminal gang to sexually assault her own sister. She ordered the men to show no mercy on her during this preplanned assault. The gang instead of following through the plan, enact the same plan on Roja. The controversial episodes were telecast on May 14, 15 and June 28, 2019.

The council, on examining the video clips based on the complaints, said in their order that the content violated the Indian Broadcasting Foundation (IBF) guidelines which bars content that glorifies violence, as well as incite or encourage viewers to obscene or indecent behaviour. A notice was issued to the channel and in their reply to the council, Sun TV and Thiru Pictures clarified and apologised to the council. The order stated that they consented to agree with their decision as well.
