= Kalyanam (2009 TV series) =

2009 Indian Tamil-language soap opera

- Genre: Soap opera
- Written by: Pattukottai Prabhakar
- Screenplay by: Pattukottai Prabhakar
- Directed by: Viduthalai (1-49); Sundhar.K.Vijayan (50-110)
- Creative director: T.G.Thiyagarajan
- Starring: Meena; Yuvarani; Saakshi Siva; Delhi Kumar; Mohan Raman
- Theme music composer: Ramani Bharadhwaj
- Opening theme: Anantham Anantham Kalyanam; K. S. Chithra (Vocals); Pirusoodan (Lyrics)
- Country of origin: India
- Original language: Tamil
- No. of seasons: 1
- No. of episodes: 110

Production
- Producers: T. T. G. Thiyagasaravanan; Selvi Thiyagarajan
- Cinematography: Naga Krishnan
- Editor: S. A. Ramesh Kumar
- Camera setup: Multi-camera
- Running time: approx. 20-22 minutes per episode
- Production company: Sathya Jyothi Films

Original release
- Network: Sun TV
- Release: 2 March – 7 August 2009

Kalyanam (transl. Wedding) is a 2009 Indian Tamil-language soap opera that aired on Sun TV. The show premiered on 2 March 2009 to 7 August 2009 at 7:30 p.m. IST for 110 episodes. It starred Meena, Yuvarani, Saakshi Siva, Delhi Kumar, Mohan Raman and Shanthi Williams.

The show is produced by Sathya Jyothi Films T.T.G Thyagasaravanan and Selvi Thyagarajan. The Show was directed by Viduthalai.

== Plot ==
The story begins with a search of a boy for the heroine Anandhi by her father Varadharajan and the suitable match Raghu was found. Everyone was happy except Elango, who was lusting for his sister-in-law. He tries all the manner of tricks to spoil Anandhi's wedding.

In the course of time, during Anandhi's engagement, Raghu's grandfather is killed in an accident. Therapy Raghu's family calling off the wedding saying that she would bring ill luck to Raghu's family.

With this turn of events, Another couple who has seen Anandhi in a temple tries to make her as daughter-in-law. Varadharajan and his family are elated about this proposal from the wealthy industrialist. But Anandhi has not come out of the cancellation of her terms of engagement with Raghu, with whom she is fond of. But reluctantly agrees to marry Parthiban.

Whether Anandhi marries Raghu or Parthiban and how the murder in the flashback is going to affect either of these three lives is the plot of the story.

== Cast ==
=== Main cast ===
- Meena
- Yuvarani
- Saakshi Siva
- Sindhu Shyam

=== Recurring cast ===
- Delhi Kumar
- Mohan Raman
- Vanthana
- Brinda das
- Rajkanth
- Nesan
- Shanthi Williams
- Aswin Kumar
- Bhavani Sankar
- Sathish
- Rajkamal
- Bhavani
- Latha Rao
- Srivithiya
- Venkat
