= Chellamay =

2009 Indian Tamil language soap opera

- Genre: Soap opera
- Written by: Radaan Media Works
- Directed by: O. N. Rathnam (Episode 720-845); Sulaiman K. Babu (Episode 551-719); C. J. Baskar (Episode 318-550); E. Vikramathithan (Episode 120-317); A. Jawahar (Episode 1-119)
- Creative director: Radhika Sarathkumar
- Starring: Radikaa Sarathkumar; Radha Ravi; Saakshi Siva; Delhi Ganesh; Vijayalakshmi; Malavika Avinash; Devipriya
- Theme music composer: Kiran
- Opening theme: "Kannukkulay Kavithaigal Undu"; Sadhana Sargam (Vocal); Pa. Vijay (Lyrics)
- Composers: Dhina (Episode 1-119); Kiran (Episode 120-317); D. Imman (Episode 318-550); Sasikumar (Episode 551-719); G. V. Prakash Kumar (Episode 720-845)
- Country of origin: India
- Original language: Tamil
- No. of seasons: 4
- No. of episodes: 845

Production
- Producer: Radhika Sarathkumar
- Cinematography: Vaseegaran
- Editor: Ganesh
- Camera setup: Multi-camera
- Running time: approx. 22–24 minutes
- Production company: Radaan Mediaworks

Original release
- Network: Sun TV
- Release: 14 September 2009 – 18 January 2013

Chellamay is a 2009 Indian Tamil language soap opera starring Radikaa Sarathkumar, Radha Ravi, Saakshi Siva, Delhi Ganesh, Vijayalakshmi, Devipriya, Abhishek Shankar and Vijay Adhiraj. It replaced Arasi and aired Monday to Friday on Sun TV from 14 September 2009 to 18 January 2013 at 9:30PM (IST) for 845 episodes.

The series revolves around the title character Chellamma, played by Radhika, who is also the creative head of the series which is produced by her production company, Radaan Mediaworks. This serial was dubbed in Telugu and was broadcast on Gemini TV as "Chittemma". The series is currently being re aired on Thanthi One channel from 20 May 2024.

== Plot ==
Avudaiappan (Ravikumar) is a widower with three sons, Kadarkaraiyaandi (Radharavi), Solaimalai (Vishwanath) and Maniarasu (Ashwin) and a lovable daughter, Chellamma (Radikaa Sarathkumar). His sister Thazhaiyamma (Subhashini) is a widow with three sons, Vadaimalai (Saakshi Siva), Sundaramoorthy (Sathya) and Rathnavelu (Sekar Muthu) and three daughters, Kalaivaani (Sonia), Azhagamma (Vandhana) and Amudha (Neelima Rani). She stays with Avudaiappan's family. Avudaiappan being a sole breadwinner of a joint family, faces a tough time to run his family with a meagre salary. Yet, he is very affectionate with everyone. He never throws a tantrum at anybody & has a positive approach towards life. One beautiful day, Avudaiappan's family migrates to Chennai for a better experience.

Thavasi (Delhi Ganesh) is the close buddy of Avudaiappan, accompanies him to Chennai. He stands beside Avudaiappan during the worst phase of Avudaiappan's life. Thavasi is a great cook who is exceptionally well known for his delicious recipes. They decide to open a roadside motel named Chellamma Bhavan. Avudaiappan invests the money for their motel business. And Thavasi works as a chef in the motel. Due to Thavasi's culinary skills, Chellamma Bhavan motel becomes widespread over the night. They make a decent profit in their business.

Avudaiappan wants to the entrepreneur for a new hotel business. He asks Thavasi to invest some money for the new hotel business. But Thavasi didn't want to risk him and lost the money. Avudaiappan strives to find money for his investment. At this situation, Thazhaiamma lends her jewels Avudaiappan and helps him financially. He invests the money and expands/develops his business. Over a short period, he becomes wealthy. In today's world, Chellamma Bhavan Hotels are one of the leading hotels with many branches around Tamil Nadu.

Thavasi feels that Avudaiappan's tremendous growth in hotel industry is all because of his hard work. He nurses grudges against Avudaiappan continues to work in Chellamma Bhavan as a supervising chef for a monthly salary.

Kadarkarai is married to Muthazhagi (Malavika Avinash) with whom he has a daughter Rathna (Samantha), while Solaimalai is married to Valliyamai (Sneha Nambiar). Both Muthazhagi and Valliyamai share a mutual dislike for their sister in law Chellamma, and always try their best to separate her from the family. Avudaiappan turns to be old and now wants his sons to take over the business. But his sons refuse to take over this huge responsibility. Due to this, Avudaiappan decides to divide his properties within his family and offers a significant share to his sister Thazhaiamma who helped him to start the business. Thavasi's last hope is to attain Avudai's property by getting his daughter Periyanayagi (Devipriya) married to Vadamalai. But Thazhaiamma requests Avudaiappan to get his daughter Chellamma married to her son Vadamalai to retain the property within their family. Thazhaiamma feels delighted to have Chellamma as her daughter-in-law. Moreover, Chellamma has the charisma to maintain the joint family. Chellamma marries Vadamalai. Sundaramoorthy is married to Palliyarai (Latha Rao) while Kalaivaani to Karuppu (Vasu Vikram) and Azhagamma to Vairavan (George Vishnu). Thavasi only hopes to retrieve Avudaiappan's money becomes a failure. Thavasi schemes a silent trap to make Avudaiappan's business fall and separate the family with the help of Gomathi (Kritheeka) whom he uses as a weapon to seduce Vadaimalai.

According to Thavasi's diabolical plan, the rift starts between both families and Avudaiappan moves away from his sister's family. The breach is tried to be settled with Maniarasu's marriage to Amudha. Still, the union makes matters worse for the family, as Amudha is in love with Maniarasu. Still, he is in love with Kavitha (Mahalakshmi), a distant cousin of Muthazhagu, who was proposed to him earlier but the marriage was annulled due to Kavitha's brother Ramakrishnan (Kamalesh) blackmailing Sundharamoorthy threatening to reveal his past and demanding money from Chellamma, which results in Sundharamoorthy and Palliyarai going into hiding. Thavasi uses these problems to cause a severe misunderstanding between Aavudaiyappan and Thazhaiyamma, who exchange crosswords. Thavasi murders Thazhaiamma, and he very cleverly traps Avudaiappan into this murder. Avudaiappan is wrongly convicted and sent to Jail. Everyone blames Chellamma for the rift caused in the family and Vadamalai sends her away from the house. The meanwhile Muthazhagu poisons Kadarkarai's mind and separates the beautiful relationship between the brother and sister. Meanwhile, Muthazhagu's mother (Varalaxmi) makes Muthazhagi undergo a ritual by which it is a sin to see or eat/drink from Chellamma's family. Also, Valliyamai, along with Muthazhagi, drive out Amudha away from their house. This further angers Vadaimalai, who from further poisoning by his sisters Azhagamma and Kalaivaani drives Chellamma away. The only person who cares for Chellamma is Vadaimalai's uncle Mahadevan (Vishwanathan) who takes her into his house.

Chellamma insists CBCID to investigate Thazhaiamma's murder case. With the help of CBCID, Chellamma proves that Thavasi as a convict. Now Avudaiappan is released from Prison with much difficulty of Chellamma. But Avudaiappan's son by forced takes him to their house. Chellama left alone starts a canteen with the help of her uncle and neighbour Vasu (Rajkanth) in AK College where she befriends the owner Anbu Kumar (AK) (Abhisekh). AK sacks the former canteen owner Sivasubramaniam (Kalidas) and gives the management to Chellamma. Meanwhile, AK suffers daily temptation from his alcoholic wife, Madhumitha (Kanya Bharathi) who gets drunk and blames him as the source for all her misfortunes. Also, his son Suresh (Venkat) is a drunkard, and his daughter Anjali (Kavyavarshini) is a stubborn girl who keeps going out with her boyfriend, Karthik (Balaji) despite her mother's warnings. All this turns out to be hell for AK, who finds it soothing only at college in Chellama's company. Meanwhile, Sivasubramaniam, along with AK's Manager Siva further poison Madhumitha's mind against Chellamma, drawing a sworn hatred towards her. Madhumitha insults Chellamma and throws her out of college with the help of Sivasubramaniam and Shiva and a few college students, and takes over the management from AK, which again results in catastrophic results. Chellamma gets pregnant, and Vadaimalai joins with her once again.

Meanwhile, Thavasi's daughter, Periyanayagi alias Sneha (Devipriya), arrives and promises her dad that she will break up Aavudaiyappan's family. Sneha goes on influencing Kadarkarai and manages to seduce him and lures him into her trap. Using him, she does all she can to break up the family. She also uses Kadarkarai to get her father released from Jail, and they plot together to separate the family. Meanwhile, Kavitha gets pregnant with Maniarasu's child and starts living with him. She also humiliates Amudha at particular instances with Vasu, which results in her giving divorce. They almost immediately get married, and Kavitha arrives in the house. She finds out about the affair between Kadarkarai and Sneha and uses this to blackmail him. Meanwhile, she also influences Valliyammai to turn against Muthazhagu. Also, Chellama finds out about the affair between her brother and Sneha and relates it to her father. He tries his best to question Kadarkarai but suffers utter humiliation and decides to move away to an elders' home. Meanwhile, the whole family separates due to small fights and properties are divided among them, and all go away on their own.

Chellamma once again goes and tells Muthazhagu about the affair between Kadarkarai and Sneha, but she refuses to believe it. Later she questions Kadarkarai who says it is all lies. She asks him to confirm it by promising on their daughter Rathna, which he does having no other option, which he grieves a lot.

Muthazhagi, along with her mother, is introduced to Madhumitha by Sivasubramaniam and Shiva, and all of the plots together to destroy Chellamma. Muthazhagi's mother gives Sivasubramaniam poison asking to mix it and give to Chellamma, which will result in the death of her fetus. Siva videos this and madhumitha exchanges the bottle with a bottle of dangerous poison to kill Chellamma. However, in a turn of events, Chellamma eats the poisoned food, resulting in one of her fetuses to become deformed. Vadaimalai knows this but hides it from Chellamma.

Meanwhile, Chellamma manages to bring Amudha from her hostel and makes her live with them. She slowly does her best to bring Amudha out of her state of sorrow and to turn over a new leaf. Vasu's mother, Vishakham (Srilekha Rajendran), arrives. She is impressed with Amudha and is determined to make Amudha, her daughter in law and ask Vasu to propose to her. He does so, but Amudha refuses the proposal stating she is an unlucky person and nobody should suffer due to her.

Another storyline follows Anjali who is gang-raped by four guys, DC's brother Satish (Dev Anand), an MP's son Murali, a lawyer's brother Ashok and another of their friends Vinod, in the presence of Anjali's lover, Karthik, who runs away leaving her behind. This comes as a complete downfall on AK, especially when it is publicised in the media. Madhumitha continually torments her daughter, reminiscing about the incident, which results in AK taking his daughter to Chellamma, who takes care of her. Anjali, at first disheartened, starts to develop fits as a result of the rape, and suffers many forms of torment from Satish's brother DC Sethupathi (Bhanu Prakash), but Chellamma settles all. Meanwhile, one of the rapists, Vinod dies, and Sethupathi suspects it is the work of someone in AK's family and starts to interrogate AK, Suresh and Anjali. Meanwhile, Sivasubramaniam and Shiva use the murder as a golden opportunity to fetch money from Madhumitha, claiming to have committed the crime. They are abducted by the MP's henchman and threatened to give any leads on this case to them. Meanwhile, Amudha meets Vasu's mother on the road outside the temple, where Visakham tries to avoid her, and when Amudha asks as to why she humiliates her. The Next day, Vasu comes to ask for forgiveness from Amudha, but she doesn't cooperate, and they have a tiff. All this is noted by Chellamma's Assistant Sumathi (Jayanthi) who spills the beans to Chellamma, who inquires the situation from Vasu, who reveals all information about the proposal. Chellamma is shocked and somehow happy about Vasu's plan and tells of putting it aside for a while until Amudha comes out of her nutshell.

Meanwhile, Kadarkarai's construction workers go on strike as they cannot work without any wages. Kadarkarai arrives and decides to pawn Sneha's jewellery and give the money, but she refuses to give it out and creates a scene. So Kadarkarai goes home and asks Muthazhagu for her jewels, but she again refuses, which results in Kadarkarai stealing them.

Meanwhile, Kavitha's mother (Nithya) prepares the family for Kavutha's baby shower ceremony. Maniarasu decides to call only a few guests, but Kavitha wants to invite everyone. But Maniarasu feels ashamed as everyone will inquire about their father, so they invite-only close relations. So Kavitha goes to Mutazhagu's house wearing a lot of jewels and invites her. Muthazhagu who is jealous to see Kavitha's treasures and she tries to show off her treasures to Kavitha only to find out they have been burgled. She is very sad. Meanwhile, Kavitha leaves with Maniarasu to Solaimalai's house where she invites them both to the function and also relates all about Kadarkarai's affair with Sneha to Valliyamai. Muthazhagu and her mother visit a saint who reveals the location of the jewels in Sneha's house. They immediately go there, and They search all over for the gems but to no avail, they threaten Sneha to return the jewels or the worst would happen. Meanwhile, Snhea poisons radar kai when he arrives, and he goes home and starts to beat Muthazhagu, whereas her father unable to watch this, humiliates him resulting in him leaving the house for good.

Meanwhile, at Kavitha's betrothal function, Muthazhagu shows up wearing fake jewellery, for which she is humiliated by Kavitha and Valliyamai. Meanwhile, Chellamma arranges an alliance for Amudha, which she disrupts, giving the same reasons she gave to Vasu. As this goes on, Chellamma does all she can to get justice for Anjali and traces out the other three rapists. Meanwhile, Anjali gets pregnant and is disheartened. Chellamma, along with some nurses, conducts a DNA test on the Rapists and it is revealed that Satish is the biological father of Anjali's fetus.

Meanwhile, Muthaazhagi occurs with a severe illness in her womb due to which her mother begs Chellamma had no other option to save her daughter. Chellamma pays for the operation and saves Muthazhagu, where she asks for forgiveness from Chellamma, and they join each other.

Using this reason, Chellamma makes wedding plans for Anjali and Sathish secretly. Meanwhile, Kattathurai alias Karuppu has joined a child abducting gang leaving aside his wife, Kalaivani and works for a female gangster, Kamini (Sangeetha Balan) where they abduct children. Meanwhile, Anjali and Vasu's wedding preparations are made against Vasu's mother and Madhumitha, however, in a turn of events, Anjali marries Satish and Vasu marries Amudha. Anjali is harassed by Sethupathy, while Amudha suffers torture from Visalam and Kavitha who moves in next door. Also, Thavasi goes to Kaasi and send Gomathi who awaits her revenge to assist Sneha. They get together and do several deeds like killing DC Sethupathi and Rekha, stealing Chellama's baby using Kamini and blackmailing her about the child. Vadamalai hides the fact about the baby from Chellamma, however, realises it later on. Also, Sneha beats Vadamalai, and he goes missing, and Kadarkarai gets arrested for this. Sneha and Gomathi send this to Rathna's phone as an MMS, and she commits suicide seeing the video. Also, several problems arise when Vadamalai's uncle turns against Chellamma and separates Vadamalai and Chellamma, and also kidnaps Chellama's baby from Gomathi. He along with Maya, his friend rob Vadamalai of his wealth but he gets cheated by Dhanam. Meanwhile, AK kills the other two rapists using Sanjeevi and is imprisoned and writes his will in favour of Chellamma, which angers Madhumitha who insults Chellamma and plots along with Satish to destroy Chellamma. Also, Amudha works for a company owned by Moorthy who lusts for her and tries to rape her. However she kills him, and she and Maniarasu dispose of the body, yet a cop, Raghunath videos it and in return asks for money and also tries to have sex with Amudha. However, Chellamma saves her and hands over the evidence to AC Sivaranjini, who however changes the case in favour of Moorthy, as he is her brother and arrests AMudha and Mani.

Meanwhile, Sneha shoots Kadarkarai and is sent to Jail, and Thavasi goes Mad. Later, however, she comes out and acts in favour of everyone and marries Kadarkarai. However, she kills him and blames Chellamma for it. Also, Chellamma finds Shanthi, Moorthy's wife who testifies against him and saves Amudha and Mani and gets Sivaranjini stripped of her police position. Sivaranjini joins with Sneha and starts annoying Chellamma. Meanwhile, Vadamalai marries Gayathri (Vijayalakshmi) and starts living with her. However, problems continuously arise between them and Chellamma.

The serial was G.V. Prakash Kumar played last directed by O.N. Rathnam and music. The series finale (episode 845) was released on Friday 18 January. The serial concluded with Gayathri having a baby and Vadamalai and Gayathri naming the child after Chellama.

== Cast ==
=== Main cast ===
- Radikaa Sarathkumar as Chellamma Vadamalai
- Saakshi Sivaa as Vadamalai (Chellamma's Husband)

=== Recurring cast ===
- Vijayalakshmi as Gayathri (Vadamalai's second wife)
- Malavika Avinash as Muthuazhagi (Kadarkaraiyaan' wife)
- Devipriya as Periyanayaki alias Sneha (Main Antagonist and Kadarkaraiyaan's second wife)
- Radha Ravi as Kadarkaraiyaan (Chellamma's Elder Brother, Dead)
- Delhi Ganesh as Thavasi (Antagonist)
- Ravikumar as Avudaiappan
- Vichu Vishwanath as Solaimalai
- Sneha Nambiyar as Valliyammai Solaimalai
- Subhashini as Thaalaiyamma (Dead)
- Neelima Rani as Amudha Vasu
- Latha Rao as Palliyarai Sundaram
- Sonia as Kalaivani Karuppudurai
- Vasu Vikram as Karuppudurai
- Ashwin Kumar / Shravan as Maniarasu
- Rajkanth as Vasu
- Srilekha Rajendran as Visakham
- Varalaxmi as Visalatchi
- V C Jeyamani as Muththazhagi's father
- Mahalakshmi Shankar as Kavitha Maniarasu
- Sathappan Nandakumar as Eshwaramoorthy

=== Additional cast ===
- Vijay Adhiraj as Lawyer Avinash
- Abhishek Shankar as Anbukumar (AK)
- Kanya Bharathi as Madhumitha AK
- Kavyavarshini as Anjali Sathish
- Venkat as Suresh
- Shilpa Mary Teresa as AC Sivaranjini
- K. Viswanath as Dr. Gurunathan (Guru)
- Sangeetha Balan as Kamini
- Rajyalakshmi as Parvathi (Dead)
- Kritheeka as Gomathi
- Dev Anand Sharma / Yuvanraj Nethrun as Satish
- Nithya Ravindran as Kavitha's mother
- Syamantha Kiran as Rathna (Dead)
- Bhanuprakash as DC Sethupati (Dead)
- Rekha Suresh as Rekha (Dead)
- Sathya as Sundharamoorthy
- Pasi Sathya as Maya
- Kamalesh PK as Ramakrishnan
- George Vishnu as Vairava
- Vandhana as Alagamma
- Sekar Muthu as Rathnavelu
- Minnal Deepa as Shanthi Moorthy
- Siva Kavitha as Santhi
- Vinayak as Venkateshwara Rao
- Yuvashree as Bala
- Sairam as Bala's husband
- Vishvan as Raghuvaran
- Kumaresan as Achudhan
- 'Anandham' Kalidas as Sivasubramaniam
- Ravi Chandran as Rajamanickam
- Theni Murukan as Maari
- Baboos as Thomas

== Title ==
This title was taken from a 2004 Chellamae movie starring Vishal, Reema Sen and Bharath. The title means "darling".

== Title song ==
It was written by lyricist Pa. Vijay, composed by Kiran, and sung by Sadhana Sargam. It was remade in three languages.

=== Soundtrack ===
Track list
No.	Title	Lyrics	Music	Singer(s)	Length
1.	"Kannukkulay Kavithaigal Undu (கண்ணுக்குலே கவிதைகள் உண்டு) Title Song"	Pa. Vijay	Kiran	Sadhana Sargam	3:30

== Awards and nominations ==
Year	Award	Category	Recipient	Role	Result
2010	Sun Kudumbam Awards	Sun Kudumbam Viruthugal for Best Actor	Saakshi Sivaa	Vadamalai	Nominated
2010	Sun Kudumbam Awards	Sun Kudumbam Viruthugal for Best Brother	Radha Ravi	Kadarkaraiyaan	Nominated
2010	Sun Kudumbam Awards	Sun Kudumbam Viruthugal for Best Female Villain	Malavika Avinash	Muththazhagi	Nominated
2010	Sun Kudumbam Awards	Sun Kudumbam Viruthugal for Best Director	CJ baskar		Won
2010	Sun Kudumbam Awards	Sun Kudumbam Viruthugal for Best Screenwriter	CJ baskar		Won
2012	Sun Kudumbam Awards	Sun Kudumbam Viruthugal for Best Brother	Radha Ravi	Kadarkaraiyaan	Won
2012	Sun Kudumbam Awards	Sun Kudumbam Viruthugal for Best Actress	Radhika	Chellamma	Nominated
2012	Sun Kudumbam Awards	Sun Kudumbam Viruthugal for Best Supporting Actor	Vasu Vikram	Karuppu	Nominated
2012	Sun Kudumbam Awards	Sun Kudumbam Viruthugal for Best Supporting Actress	Malavika Avinash	Muththazhagi	Nominated
