= Pandavar Bhoomi =

2001 film by Cheran

- DVD cover
- Directed by: Cheran
- Written by: Cheran
- Produced by: Sujatha; M. Varadaraja; K. Maniprasad
- Starring: Arun Vijay; Shamitha; Rajkiran
- Cinematography: Thangar Bachan
- Music by: Bharadwaj
- Production company: Media Dreams
- Release date: 21 September 2001
- Running time: 150 minutes
- Country: India
- Language: Tamil

Pandavar Bhoomi (transl. The Land of the Pandavas) is a 2001 Indian Tamil-language drama film, written and directed by Cheran. The film stars Arun Vijay (credited as Arun Kumar), Shamitha and Rajkiran. While Vinu Chakravarthy and Mukesh Tiwari played the antagonists, Chandrasekhar, Ranjith, Manorama and Charle played supporting roles. The film, released on 21 September 2001, won the Filmfare Award for Best Director – Tamil (Cheran), and the Tamil Nadu State Film Award for Second Best Film.

== Plot ==
Dhanasekhar returns to his native village along with his family after twelve years of city life. All the villagers feel happy over welcoming him back to the village. Dhanashekar decides to build a new bungalow adjacent to his ancestral home in the village and plans to live there. He approaches Tamizharasan aka Tamizh (Arun Vijay), an architect to design his new home. Thamizh's father is also an architect who is famous for traditional architectural designs.

Dhanashekar and his family temporarily stay in his neighbour's house until the construction of the new house is completed. Thamizh also stays in a tent near the construction site managing the construction activities. Vinu Chakravarthy lives in the same village and he hates Dhanashekar and his family. He wants them to be killed and sends his son Mukesh Tiwari to work with the construction workers so that he can get them killed someday.

Jeeva is Dhanashekaran's niece and she befriends Thamizh. Thamizh also likes Jeeva and slowly, friendship transforms into love for Thamizh. When Thamizh proposes his love to Jeeva, she leaves the place without replying which makes Thamizh understand that she does not have any feelings for him.

One day, a family comes to Dhanashekhar's house expressing interest to get Jeeva married to their son. But Dhanasekhar informs them that Jeeva will be married to his younger brother Dhanapal is in jail for 12 years. Thamizh gets shocked knowing about this and he is angered because the family plans to sacrifice Jeeva by having her marry someone who has been jailed for years. Dhanashekar learns of the love between Jeeva and Thamizh. He calls Thamizh and tells him about his family's past.

In Past, Dhanashekhar was a rich farmer in the same village along with his brothers and sisters Dhanalakshmi and Thamarai (also Shamitha), and mother. Vinu Chakravarthy, a distant relative of Dhanashekhar is also a farmer in the same village, but does not like Dhanashekar's family and always picks quarrels with them. One day, Vinu and his sons sport a tractor (rare for that time) and a new Royal enfield in front of the villagers, who get to know that they have leased off a portion of land to a Tanning factory. Despite the village council's warning to cancel the lease as it would pollute entire water source, Vinu and his sons refuse. The village's farmers, led by Dhanashekar and his brothers waylay the tanning factory officials and explain their issue, following which the project is shifted to another place. Vinu and his sons refuse to return the advance payments, and their new vehicles are eventually ceased off by the factory management.

The next night, Vinu Chakravarthy poisons the farm pond of Dhanashekar, thereby killing all of Dhanashekar's cows and oxen that drank water from the pond. Dhanashekar gets furious and lodges a complaint with the police following which Vinu Chakravarthy is incarcerated. Things cool off a bit, but then to everyone's shock, the family learns that Thamarai is in love with Akash, Vinu Chakravarthy's younger son. Dhanashekar and his mother warn Thamarai to forget Akash and they plan to get her married immediately with someone else. But on the day of marriage, Thamarai elopes from home with Akash and Dhanashekar's mother dies the same night, as she could not tolerate this.

While Dhanashekar and his brothers perform their mother's funeral and take her body to the graveyard in a procession, Thamarai comes along with Akash following their wedding. Dhanapal gets furious seeing her and he runs towards them with a sickle, and decapitates Thamarai and Akash in anger. All happened in a fraction of second and Dhanapal could not believe that he killed his own sister. He then feels guilty and surrenders to the police and is sentenced to 14 years of imprisonment.

Out of sorrow and shame, Dhanashekar and his family members covertly leave the village and move to Tirupur where they earn well and the family comes back to the same village after 11 years. But they are worried that Dhanapal's life will be spoiled as no girl will marry him as he has been jailed. So they decide to get Jeeva married to him, as it is socially permissible for a man to marry his elder sister's daughter. Jeeva though not interested in the proposal, agrees to marry her maternal uncle Dhanapal for the well-being of her family. Since Dhanapal will be released 2 years earlier due to good behaviour, the family is building the new house for the to be couple.

Thamizh understands the family's situation and decides to give up his love for Jeeva. But on the other hand, Jeeva decides to express her interest in marrying Thamizh. She meets Thamizh and conveys her love. But Thamizh says that he learned of her family's past and he also felt proud about Jeeva's decision to sacrifice her life for the happiness of her family. He apologises to Jeeva for confusing her predetermined mind in the name of love and he also requests her to marry Dhanapal who is about to get released from jail soon.

The new home is completed and Mukesh Tiwari plants a bomb in the home to destroy it and to kill everyone inside. Thamizh discovers Mukesh Tiwari's plans and alerts everyone. Also, Thamizh rushes into the house in search of the bomb and finds it after much struggle. He takes the bomb and throws it away before it could explode thereby saving all the family members and also the newly built home. The entire family thanks Thamizh for his help. Thamizh leaves to his home on the next day. After coming to know that his plan failed Vinu Chakravarthy dies out of shock.

After a few days, Dhanashekar comes along with his brothers Chandrasekhar and Dhanapal, after being released from jail to meet Thamizh and his father inviting them for the house-warming ceremony as well as for Jeeva's wedding. On seeing the invitation card, Thamizh is surprised to see his name as the groom for Jeeva.

A flashback is shown where Dhanapal, after being released from jail, comes to meet his family. They share some good moments as he meets his family members after twelve years as he never allowed anyone to meet him in jail except Dhanashekar. Dhanapal is surprised on seeing Jeeva as she exactly resembles his sister Thamarai in looks. Dhanapal also believes that Thamarai has been reborn in the form of Jeeva and feels happy that he got back his lovable sister whom he killed out of anger. So he wants to ensure that Jeeva is happily married and her husband is chosen with her consent. Also, Dhanapal says that he does not want to marry any one and instead he prefers to stay single along with all the family members. Realising the love of Jeeva and Thamizh, the family members then decide to have them marry. The movie ends with Thamizh and Jeeva uniting.

== Cast ==
- Arun Vijay as Tamizharasan
- Shamitha in a dual role as
  - Jeeva
  - Thamarai, Dhanasekar's sister
- Rajkiran as Dhanasekar
- Chandrasekhar as Dhanasekar's brother
- Kavitha as Dhanalakshmi, Dhanasekar's sister
- Ranjith as Dhanapal, Dhanasekar's brother
- Manorama as Deivanai, Dhanasekar's, Dhanalakshmi's, Dhanapal's and Thamarai's mother
- Vinu Chakravarthy
- Mukesh Tiwari as Vinu Chakravarthy's son
- Akash as Thamarai's love interest and Vinu Chakravarthy's youngest son
- Vijayakumar as Tamizh's father
- Ilavarasu as Carpenter
- Charle
- Ranjini
- Neelima Rani (child artist)

== Production ==
To prepare for the role of a civil engineer, Arun Vijay was handed the entire script by Cheran, who told him to visit various construction sites. The film's art director P. Krishnamoorthy created a set of a village from Mysore within ₹55 lakh (equivalent to ₹2.4 crore or US$250,000 in 2026).

== Soundtrack ==
The soundtrack was composed by Bharadwaj.

Track listing
| No. | Title | Lyrics | Singer(s) | Length |
|---|---|---|---|---|
| 1. | "Aei Samba" | Pa. Vijay | T. L. Maharajan, Malgudi Subha, Yugendran | 03:55 |
| 2. | "Avaravar Vazhkaiyil" | Snehan | Bharadwaj | 05:18 |
| 3. | "Azhagana Thadu Maatram" | Snehan | Reshmi | 01:19 |
| 4. | "Chinna Vayasula" | Snehan | Bharadwaj | 01:09 |
| 5. | "Kaviyan Kaviyan Bharathi" | Vairamuthu | K. S. Chithra | 05:14 |
| 6. | "Malargalai Padaitha" | | Srinivas | 05:58 |
| 7. | "Thozha Thozha Kanavu" | Snehan | Chitra Sivaraman, Yugendran | 04:49 |
| 8. | "Thaye Unnaiye" | Snehan | Bharadwaj | 02:23 |
| Total length: | | | | 30:05 |

== Reception ==
Malathi Rangarajan from The Hindu praised as "Inundated with talent from every quarter" and said: "has to be welcomed, with open arms because decent, meaningful cinema deserves encouragement". Rajitha of Rediff.com particularly heaped praises at Cheran for his screenplay and said "With directors of the calibre of Cheran in its rank, Tamil cinema would not be discredited or degenerated". Sify criticised the length of the film and said: "Cheran has churned out yet another village based sob story to torment you further" and concluded that "it is a typical overdose of Cheran melodrama masala". Visual Dasan of Kalki wrote that Pandavar Bhoomi, which has broken the gap between cinema and life, is a holy land that must be visited without fail. Chennai Online wrote "Like Cheran's earlier films this too is rural based, message oriented, without losing sight of the entertainment factor. A freshness in the story line and narrative style, makes the film engaging and different from the routine ones".

== Accolades ==
At the 49th Filmfare Awards South, Pandavar Bhoomi won the award for Best Director – Tamil (Cheran), its sole nomination. It also won the Tamil Nadu State Film Award for Second Best Film. At the 2002 Cinema Express Awards, Cheran won the award for Best Story.
