= Thyagam (TV series) =

Indian soap opera television series

- தியாகம்
- Genre: Soap opera
- Written by: Guru. Sampath Kumar; Dialogues by C.S.Rajendran; Guru.Sampath Kumar; S.Maruthu Shankar
- Screenplay by: Kumaresan; Guru. Sampath kumar
- Directed by: A. Abdullah (Episode 1-35); G.Bharath (Episode 36-102); Shaan Karthick (Episode 104-357); Thai Selvam (Episode 357-400)
- Creative director: R. Dinesh
- Starring: Srinath; Kaveri; Sabitha Anand; Suzane George; Udhay; Rithiya; Sivakavitha; Saraswathi; Birla Bose; Vijay Anand; Shri Durga; Dhanalakshmi
- Theme music composer: Dhina
- Opening theme: "Thiyagam"
- Composer: Kalyani
- Original language: Tamil
- No. of seasons: 1
- No. of episodes: 400

Production
- Producers: R. Raja; Dhivya Dinesh; R.Dinesh; Vaidehi Ramamoorthy
- Cinematography: P.Chella Pandiyan
- Editors: G. Balaji; M.S.Thiyagarajan, Manikandan Ravi; Perumal pattu
- Camera setup: R.Raamana Girivasan
- Running time: approx. 20-22 minutes per episode
- Production companies: Vision Time India Private Limited; Plan V Productions

Original release
- Network: Sun TV
- Release: 30 January 2012 – 31 August 2013

Thiyagam (Tamil: தியாகம்) (transl. Sacrifice) is an Indian Tamil-language soap opera that aired Monday through Friday on Sun TV from 30 January 2012 to 30 August 2013 at 1:00PM IST for 550 episodes. The show starred Kaveri, Udhay and Rithiya. The serial was produced by Vision Time India Private Limited and Plan V Productions, and directed by A. Abdullah.

The serial was ended on 30 August 2013, due to unexpected ratings where it was replaced by Vision Time India Private Limited and Plan V Productions new project Ponnunjal.

A spin off series was made by then a different story and cast by the same 2 productions Vision Time India Private Limited and Plan V Productions which replaced this serial called Ponnunjal which aired from 3 September 2013 to 20 October 2016 by completing 940 episodes.

== Plot ==
Thiyagam refers as reflects the heroine for her sacrifices. As a working lady, she sacrifices her life for her husband’s family has 3 unmarried sisters.

The story goes on about how she overcomes her problems in spite of hindrances from her mother in law. he is very careful with his husband's family. Thiygam tells the story where Mahalakshmi Thirumalai, who have 3 daughters called Abirami, Keerthi, and Sugundhi.

It tells about these daughters when they get married they face many hurdles with Sandhiya an arrogant woman who demand them to get separated and make them in fears at home. It tells about the sisters are reunited and protecting their family values and overcoming. In the climax scene, Sandhiya gets arrested for our masterminded plans, where the parents come to reunite with the family to be happy again.

== Cast ==
=== Main cast ===
- Kaveri as Abirami Kalyan
- Udhay as Kalyan
- Rindhiya as Sandhiya

=== Supporting roles ===
- Dr.Srinath as Thirumalai
- Sabitha Anand as Mahalakshmi Thirumalai
- Suzane George as Sugundhi
- Durga as Periyanayaki
- Gowthami Vembunathan as Sivagami
- Keerthi as Abirami's sister
- Birla Bose as Vinoth
- Sivakavitha as Akila
- Vijay Anand as Vasanth
- Saraswathi as kaveri/gowri
- Ramki
- C.H.Krishnaveni
- Neelima Rani as Aiswarya
- Jayandh
- Nagalaksmi
- Aravind kathare
- Azhaghu as Appasamy
- Iswarya Menon as Avantika
- A.Tamilkumaran as Gowri's father
- Dhanalakshmi as Malliga.
- Meenakshi as Meenakshi
- Shobhana as Megala
- Raja
- Vincent Roy as Gowdhan
- Tinku
- Adhthiya as Arivalagan
- Boys Rajan
- Rajkumar Manoharan
- Jagan
- Adhavan
- Srilatha
- Diana
- Master Basha
- Padmini
- Nandhini
- Sundari Ganeshan

== Title song ==
It was written by the famous lyricist Vairamuthu, composed by the famous music director Dhina. It captures the theme of the story with simple and effective words.
