= Thirumurugan (director) =

Indian film and television director

- Occupation: Director
- Years active: 1998–present

Thirumurugan Muniyaandi is an Indian Tamil film and television director. He holds a Guinness World Record for the longest continuous camera shot.

== Career ==
graduating from Chennai film institute, Thirumurugan, began his career on television in Doordarshan with the teleserial Gokulam Colony and also directed Chinnathirai Kathaigal for JJ TV. He then directed and acted in Metti Oli. His entry into the Kollywood film industry was with Em Magan (2006), which was also much talked about. After the success of Em Magan, he partnered with actor Bharath, in a film titled Muniyandi Vilangial Moonramandu (2008).

He also directed the drama, Nadhaswaram where he also played the role of the lead actor. During a live episode, he directed a continuous camera shot lasting 23 minutes and 25 seconds, which is listed as a Guinness World Record.

== Filmography ==
=== Films ===
Year	Film	Notes
2006	Emtan Magan	Director
2008	Muniyandi Vilangial Moonramandu	Director

=== Short films ===
Year	Film	Notes
2019	Thuppukettavan	Actor, Writer, Producer and Director
2021	Amma	Director
2021	Sabalam	
2021	Nawaz	
2021	Pei Veedu	

== Television ==
=== Serials ===
Year	Title	Director	Writer	Actor	Producer	Networks	Notes
1998	Gokulam Colony	Yes	No	No	No	DD Podhigai	
1999	Nallur Kaaval Nilayam	Yes	No	No	No	DD Podhigai	
1998–1999	Akshaya	Yes	No	Yes	No	Sun TV	
1999–2000	Panchavarnakkili	Yes	No	No	No	Sun TV	
2001	Appu Kuppu	Yes	No	No	No	DD Podhigai	
2001	Thuru Pidikkum Manasu	Yes	No	No	No	Raj TV	
2001–2002	Aanandha Bhavan	Yes	No	No	No	Sun TV	
2001–2002	Sathya	Yes	No	No	No	Sun TV	
2001–2002	Kaveri	Yes	No	No	No	Sun TV	
2002–2005	Metti Oli	Yes	Yes	Yes	No	Sun TV	
2010–2015	Nadhaswaram	Yes	Yes	Yes	Yes	Sun TV	
2012-2013	Karthikai Pengal	No	Yes	No	Yes	Sun TV	
2013-2014	Thennilavu	Yes	Yes	Yes	Yes	Sun TV	
2015–2018	Kula Deivam	Yes	No	No	Yes	Sun TV	Re-telecast on Kalaignar TV from 2022
2018–2020	Kalyana Veedu	Yes	Yes	Yes	Yes	Sun TV	

=== Youtube Series ===
Year	Title	Director	Writer	Actor	Producer	Networks	Notes
2012	Andha Pathu Naatkal	No	No	Yes	Yes	Thiru TV	
2014	Meendum Varuven	No	No	No	Yes	Thiru TV	
2014	Ethir Veetu Paiyan	No	No	No	Yes	Thiru TV	

== Awards and honours ==
Year	Awards	Category	Film/Series	Role	Result	Notes
2006	Tamil Nadu State Film Awards	Best Director	Em Magan		Won	
2008	Kalaimamani Awards				Won	
2010	Sun Kudumbam Viruthugal	Best Director (Special Prize)	Metti Oli	Gopikrishnan	Won	
2012	Sun Kudumbam Viruthugal					
2012	Sun Kudumbam Viruthugal	Best Actor	Nadhaswaram	Gopikrishnan	Won	
2012	Sun Kudumbam Viruthugal	Best Director	Nadhaswaram	Gopikrishnan	Nominated	
2012	Sun Kudumbam Viruthugal	Best Screenwriter	Nadhaswaram	Gopikrishnan	Nominated	
2012	Sun Kudumbam Viruthugal	Best Jodi	Nadhaswaram	Gopikrishnan; Malarkodi	Nominated	Nominated with Srithika
2014	Guinness World Records	Longest Continuous TV Camera Shot Live	Nadhaswaram	Gopikrishnan	Won	
2014	Mylapore Academy Awards	Best Tele Serial for Entertainment Value	Nadhaswaram	Gopikrishnan	Won	
2014	Sun Kudumbam Viruthugal	Best Actor	Nadhaswaram	Gopikrishnan	Nominated	
2018	Sun Kudumbam Viruthugal	Best Screenwriter	Kalyana Veedu	Gopikrishnan	Won	
2018	Sun Kudumbam Viruthugal	Best Brother	Kalyana Veedu	Gopikrishnan	Won	
2018	Sun Kudumbam Viruthugal	Multi-Talented	Kalyana Veedu	Gopikrishnan	Won	
2019	Sun Kudumbam Viruthugal	Best Screenwriter	Kalyana Veedu	Gopikrishnan	Won	
2019	Sun Kudumbam Viruthugal	Best Brother	Kalyana Veedu	Gopikrishnan	Won	
