= Pudhu Vasantham (TV series) =

Indian television series

- Genre: Drama
- Created by: Maheswari
- Written by: Dialogues; S. Christy
- Screenplay by: Rajprabhu
- Directed by: R. Karthikeyan Thulasi raman
- Starring: Shyam Ji; Soniya Suresh
- Theme music composer: Visu
- Opening theme: "Asai Asai Asai" Haritha (Vocals) Snehan (Lyrics)
- Country of origin: India
- Original language: Tamil
- No. of seasons: 1
- No. of episodes: 1003

Production
- Producer: M.Paramesh
- Cinematography: P. Kasinathan and Nithin
- Editor: C. Sajin
- Camera setup: Multi-camera
- Running time: Approx.20-22 minutes per episode (2023-2026); Approx.42-45 minutes per episode (Aug.2026-Sep.2026)
- Production company: Peacock Studios; Sun Entertainment

Original release
- Network: Sun TV
- Release: 26 June 2023 – 26 September 2026

Pudhu Vasantham (transl. New Spring) was an Indian Tamil-language television series. It stars Soniya Suresh and Shyam Ji. The show was directed by R karthikeyan & Thulasi raman and produced by M. Paramesh under the banner of Peacock Studios and Sun Entertainment lead roles. It premiered on June 26 2023 replacing Thallattu serial and ended on September 26 2026 being replaced by Kuruinji and Abirami serials

== Cast ==
=== Main ===
- Shyam Ji as Velmurugan "Velu" (Selvi's husband)
- Soniya Suresh as Selvi Velmurugan (Velmurugan's wife, Sandhanapandi's daughter)

=== Recurring ===
- Vaishnavi Nayak as Keerthi Thirumurugan: Thirumurugan's wife (Main Antagonist turned protagonist)
- Nathan Shyam as Thirumurugan "Thiru" Srinivasan: Maha's Younger brother. Velu, Pooja, and Bala's Elder brother
- VC Jeyamani as Srinivasan: Maha, Thiru, Velu, Pooja, and Bala's father
- Gowthami Vembunathan as Karpagam Srinivasan: Maha, Thiru, Velu, Pooja, and Bala's mother
- Shravan Dwaraganath as Sandhanapandi (Selvi's father)
- Siva Kavitha as Manonmani (Selvi's mother)
- Devipriya as Mahadevi "Maha" Shanmugam (Shanmugam's wife and Thiru, Velu, Pooja and Bala's elder sister)
- Shanthi Williams / Eesan Sujatha as Rajeshwari: (Keerthi's mother) (Antagonist turned protagonist)
- Kovai Babu as Shanmugam (Mahadevi's husband)
- Hasin /Aruna devi as Pooja Vinod: Maha, Thiru, Velu's younger sister
- Niketan / Yogan Subhash as Balamurugan "Bala" Srinivasan: Maha, Thiru, Velu's Pooja's youngest brother
- Madhan as Vinod: Pooja's Husband
- Bhavya Shri as Nandhini (Selvi's best doctor friend)
- Som Soumyan as Nandhini's father
- Meenakshi Muruha as Nandhini's mother
- Hema Dayal as Rudhra: Selvi's new Lawyer
- Yalini vinod as Archana: Selvi's old Lawyer
- Vinod Kumar as Gowtham: Archana's Husband
- Tamil Selvan as Pagoda: Velu's best friend
- Surjith Ansary as Sundar (Antagonist)
- Abina Ravi as Divya, Sundar's wife
- KB Balasubramani as Brahma, Sundar's father (Antagonist)
- Ganesh as as Gowtham: Pooja's ex-fiancéé

=== Special Appearance ===
- Akshaya Kandamuthan as Kamatchiamman
- Harika Sadu / Divya Sridhar / Gracy Thangavel / Shambhavy Gurumoorthy as Bhavaniamman
- Dhanu Kannan as Saranya
- Joshua Suresh as Saranya's relative

== Production ==
=== Development ===
In late May 2023, the series was announced by Sun Entertainment, highlighting the issue of joint family. The first promo of the series was released on 14 June 2023 and featured the female lead.

=== Casting ===
Shyam Ji was cast as the protagonist Velu, by making this his first lead role. Actress Gowthami Vembunatham was cast as Velu's mother Karpagam.

In July 2023, actress Shanthi Williams and Vaishnavi Nayak were signed.

=== Release ===
The show started airing on Sun TV on 26 June 2023 on Monday to Saturday.

== Adaptations ==
Language	Title	Original release	Network(s)	Last aired	Notes	Ref.
Telugu	Maa Inti Devatha మా ఇంటి దేవత	14 October 2024	Sun Gemini	17 October 2026	Remake	
Kannada	Krishna Vamshi ಕೃಷ್ಣವಂಶಿ	2 March 2026	Sun Udaya	Ongoing	Remake	

== Broadcast history ==
It began airing on Sun TV on 26 June 2023 from Monday to Saturday at 13:30 (IST). Starting on 20 July 2026, Later, a serial named Siragugal it shifted to the afternoon slot at 15:00 IST..
