= Kaisi Laagi Lagan =

- Promotional logo
- Genre: Drama
- Story by: Anshuman Sinha; Dialogues: Anjum Abbas; Sagar Gupta
- Directed by: Jafar Sheikh
- Creative directors: Natlene Rodrigues; Doris Dey
- Starring: See below
- Theme music composer: Lalit Sen & Raman Dubey
- Opening theme: "Kaisi Laagi Lagan" by Rajab Ali and Madhushree
- Country of origin: India
- Original language: Hindi
- No. of seasons: 1
- No. of episodes: 87

Production
- Executive producers: Sachin Salgaonkar & Viren Nagre
- Producers: Prem Malhotra & Sunil Mehta
- Cinematography: Brijesh Singh
- Editors: Afzal, Randhir, Sabi Bharaj, Sanjeev Shukla, & Swapnil Nerurkar
- Camera setup: Multi-camera
- Running time: Approx. 24 minutes
- Production company: Cinevistaas Limited

Original release
- Network: Sahara One
- Release: 13 October 2008 – 10 February 2009

Kaisi Laagi Lagan is an Indian television series that premiered on Sahara One on 13 October 2008, based on the story of a cursed marriage.

== Plot ==
The story revolves around the life of a girl named Pratha, who is raised solely by her mother since 5 years old.

== Cast ==
- Mahhi Vij as Pratha
- Ashmit Kaushik as Raghav
- Priyamvada Sawant as Chitra
- Himmanshoo A. Malhotra as Swayam
- Romanchak Arora
- Prabha Sinha
- Sudha Chandran as Ambika (Raghav's Mother)
- Sandeep Mehta
- Satya Sarkar
- Vishal John Khan(Vishal Vinda Vijay Palyekar as Rahul( College Student / Anchor / Host )
