= Prabha Sinha =

Indian film and television actress (born 1950)

- Born: 16 April 1950 (age 76)
- Other name: Puttu
- Occupation: Television actress

Prabha Sinha is an Indian film and television actress. She entered the television scene around the time there was a boom of soap operas. She gained popularity with her performance in Mahesh Bhatt's Swabhimaan (1995), written by Shobha De.

== Biography ==
Granddaughter of Rai Bahadur Mukteshwar Prasad, she excelled in academics with first class first honors in Sociology. Coming from a family of mostly doctors and lawyers, she entered the television scene accidentally after she had 2 daughters (both Software Engineers in US now). She also likes doing social work.

== TV career ==
Best known for her portrayal of the character Sheela in the television serial Swabhimaan, opposite Deepak Parashar, which was DD's second daily soap just after Shanti. It was later telecasted on Star plus. She starred in Itihaas, which was Balaji's first daily soap on DD. Itihaas was centered on the story of three sisters, one of whom was played by her. This was followed by Parampara on Zee TV, a Siddhant cine vision production (Manish Goswami). Another notable performance by Prabha was in the television serial Palchin on Star Plus, directed by Neena Gupta, opposite Arun Govil and Mohan Bhandari. Aurat was telecasted on DD. This was a B.R. Chopra Production. In Zameer on Zee TV, she was opposite Virendra Singh and Mohan Gokhale. Chonch Ladi Re Chonch ran on 9 Gold, this was her first venture in comedy, it was directed by Anuj Kapoor and opposite Benjamin Gilani. In Ittefaq telecasted on Zee Tv, she was opposite yesteryear film star Rajesh Khanna. She was the protagonist in the serial Sanskruti on Star Plus (Cine Vista) along with actress Savita Prabhune, opposite Vijayendra Ghatge. Karawaas on Zee TV, opposite Arun Govil. Ashiqui on Zee TV, opposite Arun Govil (directed by Arun Frank). Kahani Nahin, Jeevan Hai on ETV. Kundali on Star Plus, (Balaji prod.) opposite Sai Balal, was an interesting story about two sisters and she played their mother-in-law. She also starred in the hit television series Kumkum on Star Plus BAG Films, which ran for a very long duration. She also starred in the hit television series KKusum on Sony TV Balaji Production. Bazar, Intezaar Aur Sahi on DD, opposite Rajeev Verma (Samvaad Video). Kaisi Lagi Lagan on Cine Vista on Sahara TV. Chhoti Bahu on Zee Tv was DJ's production, opposite Surendra Pal. Her role in Shubh Kadam was also admired.

== Film career ==
Her first role in a movie was in Mother 98, which was opposite Bollywood film star Jeetendra, the cast also included Rekha, Rakesh Roshan and Randhir Kapoor and it was directed by Saawan Kumar. It was followed by Good Boy Bad Boy, a Subhash Ghai production, where she played Emraan Hashmi's mother. Other movies included Amrita, which was an NFDC film and Akheer, directed by Bhisham Kohli.

== Filmography ==
=== Soap operas ===
- Parampara (1993 - 1999)
- Swabhimaan (1995)
- Chanakya
- Itihaas
- Pal Chinn as Sandhya Singh (1999 - 2000)
- Aurat
- Zameer
- Chonch Ladi Re Chonch
- Ittefaq (2002)
- Sanskruti (2001)
- Karawaas
- Ashiqui
- Vishwaas
- Kundali (2002)
- Kumkum - Ek Pyara Sa Bandhan as Veena Kulbhushan Wadhwa (2002 - 2009)
- Kkusum as Reema Raman Kanwar (2002 - 2003)
- Ayushmaan as Dr. Kavya's Mother (2005)
- Bazaar
- Intezaar Aur Sahi
- Kaisi Laagi Lagan
- Koie Jane Na (2004)
- Chotti Bahu - Sindoor Bin Suhagan as Vaishali Purohit (2008 - 2010)
- Kaisi Laagi Lagan (2008)
- Shubh Kadam (2009)
- Saath Saath
- Zee Horror Show (As Nandini, in critically acclaimed episode Saaya)
- Reporters (Indian TV series)

=== Movies ===
- Mother (1999)
- Good Boy Bad Boy (2007)
- Amrita
- Akheer
