= Madhumitha Hirannaiah =

Indian television actress

- Born: 29 March 1999 (age 27); Bangalore, Karnataka, India
- Occupation: Actress
- Years active: 2017 – present
- Known for: Ethirneechal

Madhumitha Hirannaiah, known professionally as Madhumitha H. (born 29 March 1999) is an Indian television actress who works in Tamil, Telugu and Kannada language television shows. She debuted in Kannada mythological series and played the role of the goddess Lakshmi in the 2018 show Jai Hanuman.

== Career ==
In 2017, Madhumitha started her career in the Kannada serial Shani. Later in 2018 she appeared in the Kannada serial Puttamalli which aired on Star Suvarna. In 2019, she debuted into the Tamil television industry in the soap opera Piriyadha Varam Vendum playing the lead and dual role as Durga / Amaravathi which was aired on Zee Tamil. She later returned to Telugu television and appeared in the serial No.1 Kodalu playing the role as Saraswathi. In 2022, Madhumitha was cast in the lead role in the Tamil soap opera Ethirneechal. The serial was critically acclaimed and becomes most watched TV series from it was launched, and she gets praises and critical acclaim for her role as "Janani", a headstrong and self obsessed women and bagged several awards including Favourite Actress at Sun Kudumbam Viruthugal However she quit the series in its second season. In early 2025, Madhumitha cast as lead role in Ayyanar Thunai as Nila, a family drama series, which is being airing on Star Vijay. The series became one of the most watched TV shows in Tamil Nadu. For that, she awarded as the Find of the Year in Vijay Television Awards.

== Personal life ==
In February 2024, Madhumitha was charged with reckless driving, after hitting a police officer on duty in her car.

== Television ==
=== Serials ===
Year	Serial(s)	Character(s)	Language(s)	Network	Notes	Ref.
2017-2018	Shani	Devi Neelima	Kannada	Colors Kannada	Television debut	
2018	Puttmalli	Saniha	Kannada	Star Suvarna		
2018 - 2019	Jai Hanum	Lakshmi	Kannada	Udaya TV		
2018 - 2020	Manasuna Manasai	Pavithra	Telugu	Star Maa		
2019 - 2022	No.1 Kodalu	Saraswathi	Telugu	Zee Telugu		
2019 - 2020	Piriyadha Varam Vendum	Durga / Amaravathi	Tamil	Zee Tamil		
2022 - 2024	Ethirneechal	Janani Shakthivel	Tamil	Sun TV		
2025 - present	Ayyanar Thunai	Nila Chozhan	Tamil	Star Vijay		

=== Reality shows ===
Year	Title	Role	Language	Network	Notes and Ref.
2022	Super Queen Season 2	Contestant	Telugu	Zee Telugu	Finalist
2022	Zee Super Family	Contestant	Telugu	Zee Telugu	One of the contestants
2023	Ranjithame Season 2	Contestant	Tamil	Sun TV	Finalist
2025	Oo Solriya Oo Oohm Solriya Season 3	Contestant	Tamil	Star Vijay	Week 14 Contestant

== Awards and nominations ==
Year	Work	Language	Award	Category	Result	Ref.
2021	No.1 Kodalu	Telugu	Zee Kutumbam Awards	Favourite Actress - Telugu	Won	
2023	Ethirneechal	Tamil	Behindwoods Gold Icons	Best Lead Cast On Television	Won	
2023	Ethirneechal	Tamil	Sun Kudumbam Viruthugal	Favourite Actress - Tamil	Won	
2023	Ethirneechal	Tamil	Sun Kudumbam Viruthugal	Thanga Mangai	Won	
2024	Ethirneechal	Tamil	Ananda Vikatan Television Awards	Best Actress	Nominated	
2024	Ethirneechal	Tamil	Ananda Vikatan Television Awards	Most Popular On Screen Pair (With Sabari Prasanth)	Nominated	
2024	Ethirneechal	Tamil	She Tamil Nakshatram Awards	Best Actress In Leading Role (Television)	Nominated	
2025	Ethirneechal	Tamil	Blacksheep Tele Awards	Favourite Actress	Nominated	
2025	Ethirneechal	Tamil	Blacksheep Tele Awards	Favourite Onscreen Pair (with Sabari Prasanth)	Nominated	
2025	Ayyanar Thunai	Tamil	Behindwoods Gold Icons	Most celebrated on screen pair (with Aravinth Seiju)	Won	
2025	Ayyanar Thunai	Tamil	10th annual Vijay Television Awards	Most celebrated on screen pair (with Aravinth Seiju)	Nominated	
2025	Ayyanar Thunai	Tamil	10th annual Vijay Television Awards	Find of the Year – Female	Won	
2025	Ayyanar Thunai	Tamil	10th annual Vijay Television Awards	Best Actress	Nominated	
2025	Ayyanar Thunai	Tamil	JFW Favourites of Tamil Nadu	Favourite onscreen pair – Television (with Aravinth Seiju)	Won	
