= Karunamanjari =

- கருணமஞ்சரி
- Genre: Soap opera
- Written by: Prabhu Nepal
- Screenplay by: Prabhu Nepal
- Directed by: Prabhu Nepal
- Creative director: Prabhu Nepal
- Starring: Sudha Chandran; Ajay Rathnam; Vanaya; Puspalatha
- Theme music composer: Vijay Antony; Sanjeev; Lyeice by P. Vijay
- Opening theme: Penne Penne... by Karthik
- Country of origin: India
- Original language: Tamil
- No. of seasons: 1
- No. of episodes: 182

Production
- Producer: Prabhu Nepal
- Editors: P. Kanesh; P.D Rameshsunder
- Camera setup: Multi-camera
- Running time: approx. 20-22 minutes per episode
- Production company: Jakaarb Telefilms

Original release
- Network: Raj TV
- Release: 2009 – 2010

Karunamanjari (Tamil: கருணமஞ்சரி) is an Indian Tamil-language soap opera that aired on Raj TV. The show stars Sudha Chandran, Ajay Rathnam, Vanaya and Puspalatha. The serial is directed and producer by Prabhu Nepal. The Serial Dubbed in Telugu language as Karunamanjari and aired on Vissa.

== Plot ==
Karunamanjari story revolves around a lower-middle-class family and its story line, unlike other dramas forms twists and turns, mysteries.

== Cast ==
=== Main cast ===
- Sudha Chandran as Indira
- Puspalatha as Manjari
- Vanaya / Ramya
- Ajay Rathnam

=== Additional cast ===
- Manokar
- Birla Bose
- K. S. Jayalakshmi
- Priya
- Madhubala as Kalpana
- Raja
- Durka
- Nithya Ravindran
