= Kana Kaanum Kaalangal (2022 TV series) =

Indian Tamil-language television series

- Season 3 poster
- Genre: Coming-of-age; Teen drama
- Written by: Mani & Adi (Season2&3), Shivakanth (season1)
- Directed by: M. Ramesh Baarathi; Jaswini. J Shiva Aravind; Manoj; Chidambaram Manivannan; Nitiz Maz; Vijay Kumar Rajendran
- Starring: Aravinth Seiju; Pragatheeswaran; Sangeetha Sai; Bharath; Raja Vetri Prabhu; Irfan; Teja Venkatesh; Deepika Venkatachalam; Aashik Gopinath; Vishwa Mithran; Keerthan Subash; Surendar KPY; Parvez; Sathya Narayanan; Karthikeyan DK; Akshatha; Kalyani
- Theme music composer: Shakti Sree Gopalan
- Country of origin: India
- Original language: Tamil
- No. of seasons: 3
- No. of episodes: 361

Production
- Producer: R. Venkatesh Babu
- Production location: Chennai
- Cinematography: Sathish Kumar; M. Vijay; Ananth Prabu; Karthik SJ
- Editor: G.Pa Vinoth
- Camera setup: Multi-camera
- Running time: approx. 30 minutes per episode
- Production company: Global Villagers

Original release
- Network: JioHotstar
- Release: 21 April 2022 – 14 February 2025

Related
- Kana Kaanum Kaalangal

Kana Kaanum Kaalangal (transl. Periods of Dreaming), also known by the initialism KKK, is a 2022 Indian Tamil-language television series that airs on Disney+ Hotstar. It is a reboot of the 2006 television series of the same name, which aired on Star Vijay. The story revolves around the struggles of a group of high school students and what they face during their secondary school life such as jealousy, rivalry, misunderstandings, arguments and personal grudges.

The first season of Kana Kaanum Kaalangal, which consists of 132 episodes, was released through the streaming service Disney+ Hotstar on 22 April 2022 ended on 8 December 2022. The second season was released on 21 April 2023 and ended with 112 episodes from 27 October 2023. The third season premiered on 30 August 2024 and ended with 102 episodes from 14 February 2025.

The series stars Teja Venkatesh, Raja Vetri Prabhu, Aravinth Seiju and Deepika Venkatachalam, Aashik Gopinath Bryan, while Sangeetha Sai, Irfan, Rajesh, Bharath Kumar, Deepika Venkatachalam, Akshathaa Ajit, Pranika Dhakshu, Pragatheeswaran a.k.a. Yugaa Pragathees, Aegan, VJ Kalyani, Surendar VJ, Parvez Musharaf and others appear in supporting roles. Filming for the series commenced in mid-June 2021. The series premiered on 21 April 2022. It also aired on Star Vijay from 26 December 2022 on Monday to Friday at 5:30 PM.

== Plot ==
=== Season 1 ===
The show commences with a depiction of a school and its correspondent, Mr. Sakthivel, engaging in conversation with the cleaner, Sagayam, concerning its reopening following the pandemic. Subsequently, we are introduced to Kalaiarasan, also known as Kalai from Namakkal, a young boy observed sitting in front of a house with a knife, and the circumstances surrounding this situation remain undisclosed. He is apprehended by Inspector Nagarajan, who sustains a scar below his left eye due to Kalai. Kalai ultimately finds himself in a juvenile center, where Nagarajan attempts to take his life by utilizing other inmates. Jayakumar, the warden, intervenes and rescues Kalai, sending him to Siragugal Higher Matriculation Secondary School, thereby allowing him an opportunity to restart his life. Mr. Sakthivel advises Kalai to refrain from anger and encourages him to forge friendships of good character. Kalai is employed at Sultan Bhai’s Hotel. Upon Kalai’s entry into the classroom, he is subjected to ragging by Gautham and his associates (Vicky, Gopi, Pandi, Kicha, Vasanth, Shwetha), but Abirami (Abi) steps in to defend him. In a fit of anger, Gautham reports Kalai to Abi’s mother, who is Arvind’s wife. One day, Shwetha orchestrates a scheme by placing her ring in Kalai’s bag, which is witnessed by Abi. Shwetha then lodges a complaint with Puchiappan Sir (Attai Poochi) regarding her missing ring. Although Attai Poochi penalizes Kalai, Abi’s intervention reveals Shwetha’s deceit. Gautham confronts Shwetha about the incident, yet Vicky, Gopi, Pandi, and Vasanth express their support for her. Kicha expresses admiration for Parvathy (Paru). On another occasion, Aadhiseshan, referred to as Psycho Aadhi, harasses Abi in an attempt to win her affection; however, Kalai loses his temper and physically confronts him. Upon discovering this altercation, Rajmohan Sir, Bhairavan Sir, Attai Poochi Sir, Vineeth (Jerry Sir), Malar Miss, and Mr. Sakthivel intervene to halt the conflict. As Attai Poochi Sir prepares to punish Kalai, Abi intervenes by disclosing Aadhi’s misconduct. Following the disturbance, Rajmohan Sir escorts Aadhi to the police station. Sakthivel Sir advises Kalai not to lose his composure. Kalai informs his warden, Jayakumar, regarding his transgressions. Jayakumar confronts Kalai and grants him a second chance. Several days later, the 25th-anniversary celebrations are concluded. Subsequently, Mr. Sakthivel suffers a lorry accident. Before his demise, he instructs his son Gunasekar (Guna Sir) to assume the role of correspondent of Siragugal School. Guna Sir, who had previously struggled with alcoholism, had been estranged from his father due to his drinking habits. He pledges to abstain from alcohol henceforth. Following Mr. Sakthivel's death, Guna Sir takes on the role of correspondent. Months later, Inspector Nagarajan encounters Kalai near Naachiyappan’s Modern School, where Kalai had enacted a koothu drama and received the first prize in an interschool competition; he seizes him and transports him to a secret location near Redhills. Kalai endures brutal torture at the hands of the merciless Inspector Nagarajan. Consequently, Gautham’s Gang (Gautham, Vicky, Gopi, Pandi, Vasanth, and Kicha) and Kalai’s Gang (Chellamuthu, Rajeev, Kuzhandhaivelu, Lavakushan) choose to play cricket near the haunted bungalow where Kalai was previously restrained. Nagarajan summons his mercenaries from Northern India to eliminate Kalai without a trace. However, due to the intervention of Gautham’s Gang and Kalai’s Gang, their plans are thwarted. Enraged, Nagarajan attempts to eliminate them. Just then, Guna Sir and Jerry Sir arrive, overpowering Nagarajan and his henchmen. While the entire group rallies to rescue Kalai, Nagarajan rises and aims his gun at Kalai. Suddenly, a gunshot is heard as Warden Jayakumar arrives, delivering a slap to Nagarajan for his brutality and placing him under arrest. Jayakumar instructs the entire group to ensure Kalai is admitted to the hospital. Under Jerry Sir’s guidance, Kalai begins his recovery. After a few days, Paru is rescued from her forced marriage by the collaboration of Kalai’s and Gautham’s Gangs. They undertake examinations and achieve commendable results. Raghu, who is Sakthivel Sir’s elder son, allies with Siragugal School’s Principal Bhairavan and Modern School’s Correspondent Naachiyappan to take control of Siragugal School.

=== Season 2 ===
Following the highly anticipated release of the 11th-grade examination results, Gautham's group decided to commemorate the occasion by consuming alcoholic beverages. On their way to the local wine shop, an unanticipated encounter with Pandi's father, a respected bakery owner in the community, instilled a sense of anxiety within the group. To mitigate the risk of potential repercussions, they swiftly opted for beer instead of stronger alcoholic options. Just as they prepared to open a bottle, their childhood friend, Bullet, intervened in an attempt to dissuade them from making a regrettable decision. Unfortunately, Bullet's efforts were compromised as he became intoxicated during the encounter. Seizing the opportunity while Bullet was distracted, Gautham's group discreetly exited the wine shop, only to be detected during a phone conversation with associates of Naachiyappan, a prominent individual whose presence they greatly feared.

With the commencement of the new school term, a fresh cohort of students from Naachiyappan's Modern School—Sangeetha, Madan, Mathangi, Praveen, and Naveen—transferred to Siragugal School, following a detention strategy executed by Naachiyappan. They were soon joined by Sangeetha, who contributed to the evolving dynamics within the school environment. The departure of Jerry Sir created a void that was subsequently filled by Tilottama Miss, the newly appointed educator, taking charge of the students.

Meanwhile, Praveen and Naveen, notorious for their substance abuse facilitated by their dealer, Boodhalingam, crossed a significant line when they disseminated a video that revealed Sangeetha's distressing past, leading to an emotional breakdown for her. In a demonstration of solidarity, Malar Miss, along with Kalai, Abi, Nandhini, Shwetha, and Paru, intervened to support Sangeetha, encouraging her to persist with her education amid the turmoil. During a candid discussion, Sangeetha confided in Kalai about the emotional pain inflicted by Praveen and Naveen, prompting Kalai to take decisive action against the two instigators.

After two years of rigorous training, Santhosh Kumar, affectionately known as Santhosh Sir, returned to oversee the Student President Leadership (SPL) Elections. Gautham, Kalai, and Madan emerged as the primary candidates for the position. However, tensions escalated when Praveen and Naveen vandalized Gautham's campaign poster, falsely attributing the act to Kalai and his associates. In response to the growing conflict, Guna Sir and Amirtha Miss, Raghu's former spouse, urged the candidates to seek reconciliation, underscoring the importance of integrity in leadership. They mandated that the SPL candidates submit a deposit of Rs. 10000 as part of the electoral regulations. While Madan and Gautham promptly complied, Kalai encountered a setback when Praveen and Naveen absconded with his funds to finance their drug purchases. Abi generously offered financial assistance to Kalai, who reluctantly accepted the support after considerable deliberation.

Things go awry when Raju steals Gautham's speech, and claims to have written it for Kalai. Kalai, unaware of this, opens the speech competition, and Gautham's gang is shocked to hear his speech being recited by Kalai. Gautham, however doesnt fumble, and improvises on the spot, and gradually insults Kalai, alleging him as a thief who steals the efforts of others. Raju confesses, and Kalai beats him up angrily. He tries his best to convince Gautham that he didnt know about Raju's Misdeed, but Gautham doesnt believe him and insults him, while Abi is disappointed by his actions. Sangeetha comforts Kalai. Madhan and Gautham begin campaigning. Kicha overhears Raju and Chella talking about their campaign, and lies to Gautham that they are trying to bribe people. Kalai again gets insulted, despite his efforts to make peace, as he is thought to be bribing others with his hotel food. Kalai gets mad, and berates his gang, but eventually they apologise and he forgives them, reconciling. He also tells Abi, and she finally believes him.

The next day, the results are about to be released, and initially, Kalai is seeming to be leading, but Gautham overtakes. His gang is confident that he will win, but eventually, Madan is revealed to be the winner, shocking the 2 gangs.

Madan's rise to the SPL position was marred by unethical behaviors, such as selling IPL tickets to younger students. When Malar Miss confronted him alongside Gautham's and Kalai’s group regarding his questionable conduct, Amirtha Miss intervened to de-escalate the situation. One critical day, Kalai discovered Praveen and Naveen smoking on school premises. Outraged by their blatant contravention of school regulations, Kalai confronted them physically, though he ultimately chose to forgive them afterward.

Infuriated by the perceived humiliation, Praveen and Naveen devised a plot against Kalai, enlisting Madan to their cause. Their associates subsequently launched a brutal attack on Gautham and framed Kalai for the incident. Gautham's mother, upon witnessing her son's injuries, demanded accountability from Kalai, who claimed his innocence, asserting that he had no involvement in orchestrating the assault.

Concurrently, Kalai's group, alongside Sangeetha, expressed significant concern for his well-being, apprehensive that the situation was deteriorating. Santhosh Sir, known for his stringent demeanor, imposed severe disciplinary measures on Kalai; however, due to the intervention of Malar Miss and Amirtha Miss, Kalai's expulsion was ultimately averted. Amirtha Miss imposed a strict condition: if Kalai himself were involved in the trouble again, he would resign immediately. Acknowledging the seriousness of the situation, Kalai accepted her stipulations.

Reunited with his group and Sangeetha, Kalai expressed to Gautham's circle his intention to focus on his studies. At the same time, he firmly stated that, had he been present during the previous incident, he would have directly confronted the aggressors. However, Praveen and Naveen, undeterred by Kalai’s resolve, taunted him and warned him to maintain his distance, thereby laying the groundwork for an ongoing conflict.

Shortly after, the students received their deposit back from Guna and began preparing seriously for the upcoming examinations, motivated by the announcement of a tour for those who passed. During this time, Santhosh spotted a cigarette on the school premises, which caused panic in Praveen and Naveen. In an attempt to frame Kalai again, they placed a box of cigarettes in his bag. However, their plan failed when Chella noticed the act and, taking a risky decision, removed the box and placed it in Poochi’s bag instead. Poochi, confused, was left wondering how it ended up there. Upon learning of Praveen and Naveen’s role in the incident, Kalai confronted and warned them.

The examination results were soon announced, and only twelve students—Abi, Kalai, Aadhi, Kuzhandhai, Madan, Mathangi, Shwetha, Sangeetha, Parvathy, Nandhini, Gautham, and Kicha—passed. The others were disheartened, knowing they wouldn’t be able to join the tour. However, Amirtha intervened and suggested that all students be allowed to participate, bringing hope to the rest of the class.

Tragedy struck that same day when a past mistake came back to haunt Gautham and his group: photos from their earlier visit to a bar were published by Nachiappan, who had been waiting for the right moment to tarnish the school’s reputation. The revelation enraged the school authorities. Santhosh punished the boys, and their parents were informed. However, Kalai privately spoke to Guna and convinced him to hear Gautham’s side of the story, believing they would not have engaged in any inappropriate behavior.

The gang then admitted to Guna that they had not consumed any alcohol and had only gone to the bar for fun. Guna, believing in their sincerity, decided to help. With the support of his friends, he reframed the story, claiming that the boys had gone to the bar to distribute awareness flyers to drinkers, urging them to reform. This version of the story went viral, and the school’s reputation was restored.

Despite this, Gautham remained suspicious and did not fully believe Kalai when he claimed to have helped gain Guna’s trust on their behalf.

The much-anticipated tour finally commenced, and everything went smoothly—until the final day, when Sangeetha went missing. After several tense hours, Aadhi was found with her, leading Santhosh to assume that Aadhi had misbehaved initially. However, it was soon revealed that Aadhi had saved her from a group of thugs who had nearly attacked them. The teachers promptly apologized to Aadhi and praised him for his maturity and bravery.

After the tour, the group attended a village festival, dressing up as iconic characters from popular films. As the celebrations concluded, Kalai was nearly spotted by Boodhalingam but managed to escape unnoticed. However, Abi, having followed him, confronted Kalai about his strange behavior every time Boodhalingam was nearby. Emotionally overwhelmed, Kalai finally decided to confide in her about his past and the reason he feared Boodhalingam.

A few years ago, Kalai and his family were living a peaceful and happy life. His elder sister, named Thenmozhi, was known for her righteous nature. In 2022, one day at the factory where she worked, a man named Ravi attempted to misbehave with her and was also involved in supplying drugs to other workers. Ravi was later revealed to be the younger brother of Boodhalingam. Kalai's family filed a complaint against him.

However, Inspector Nagarajan, who was corrupt, sided with the perpetrators. Offended by the family's accusations, he grew angry. Seizing the opportunity, the villains planned a brutal attack. While Kalai had stepped out to buy groceries, Boodhalingam killed Kalai's father Narayanan and mother, and Ravi assaulted Thenmozhi, and they set his house on fire. Kalai returned only to find his entire family dead. Devastated and consumed by grief, he set out to avenge their deaths.

Though initially overpowered, Kalai managed to bounce back. He killed Ravi in front of Boodhalingam and severely injured him before surrendering to the police. This incident was depicted in the first episode of Season 1.

Abi becomes emotional upon hearing his story and assures him that she will support him and never judge him. Meanwhile, Gautham, who was serving as the SPL (School Pupil Leader), learns—along with Guna—that Madhan is closely associated with Naachiappan and has not fulfilled his responsibilities as SPL. Consequently, Gautham is selected for the position, having secured the second-highest number of votes after Madhan.

Life returns to normal, and the school even wins the inter-school sports meet. On the night of the sports day’s closing ceremony, Abi hugs Kalai to congratulate him on setting a new district record in the long jump. Kalai, moved by her gesture, hugs her back. This moment is witnessed by Sangeetha, who breaks down emotionally upon seeing them together. The Next Day, while Sangeetha worries, Aadhi consoles her, unaware of her problems.

Boodhalingam, upon seeing the news of Kalai's extraordinary success in the long jump, was consumed by a furious rage at the mere thought of Kalai still being alive. In his blind anger, he summoned Inspector Nagaraj to his warehouse. When Nagaraj arrived, Boodhalingam unleashed his fury, physically assaulting him and demanding to know Kalai's location. Nagaraj, visibly shaken and trembling with fear, warned Boodhalingam that his name was on the encounter list. He then disclosed his intentions to eliminate Kalai, revealing that he had enlisted the help of henchmen linked to Salem Kadhirvel. The Henchmen try to kill Kalai using a lorry, but he narrowly escapes and reaches the hotel. After showing the Sports certificate to Aanandhagopi Master and Bhir Bhai, they praise him for his achievements. After that, Bhai warns about Boodhalingam's Arrival at the hotel during his absence. On the same evening, while Sangeetha is concerned about Kalai and Abi hugging, the commerce students send her an anonymous love message. When the commotion is heard, the phone accidentally falls. Aadhi picks up the phone, whether intentionally or not, and discovers the love message before turning it off.

The following day, Sangeetha brings her phone to school and expresses her concerns to Guna Sir and Malar Miss, who then inform Santhosh Sir to carry out an unexpected cellphone search. During this search, Santhosh discovers the phone in Aadhi's bag. Oblivious to the situation, Aadhi becomes the target of punishment.

Bhairavan proposes that Guna Sir should expel Aadhi and file an eve-teasing complaint against him. Aadhi insists that he is innocent.

Aadhi feels disheartened when Abi, Kalai, and Sangeetha label him a pervert. Meanwhile, Sangeetha experiences guilt when the actual culprits apologize to her.

Later that night, as Kalai heads to the grocery store for his hotel, he is followed by Boodhalingam's henchmen. After a lengthy pursuit, Kalai's older brother, who works at Bhai's Hotel, escorts him to the hotel. On the same street, Aadhi is out buying groceries for his family, wearing the same T-shirt as Kalai. Mistaking Aadhi for Kalai, Boodhalingam's henchmen break the light and attack Aadhi, stabbing him.

Aadhi is in pain and succumbs to his death. The next day, his parents are devastated, and his funeral occurs. Everyone from school comes and pays respect, and they feel guilty for misjudging him. Mani, Aadhi's new friend, lashes out at the students for not trusting him and labelling him as a criminal when he had never done anything wrong, especially Sangeetha, whom Aadhi had consoled. Boodhalingam arrives at the funeral and realises Kalai is not dead, and Kalai also realises he was the intended target of Boodhalingam. Kalai tells Abi everything and decides to kill Boodhalingam. He reaches the hideout of Boodhalingam and initially has the upper hand, attacking his thugs, but Boodhalingam hits him on the head and knocks him out.

Boodhalingam drives to his warehouse, and Abi tells Guna and Santhosh everything, and they go to search for Kalai. Boodhalingam mercilessly tortures Kalai, breaking his right arm and scratching his chest with a knife. Guna and Santhosh arrive and fight him; the former saves Kalai, while the latter smashes a bottle on Boodhalingam's head, knocking him out. The cops arrive and arrest Boodhalingam, while Kalai is admitted to the hospital, and his gang, master and Bhai, learns the truth. Abi is heartbroken to hear about Kalai's injuries and weeps.

Gautham's gang also learns about it and tells Abi's mother, who is mad at Abi for hanging out with Kalai. She lashes at Gautham for his tattletale. Gautham is annoyed that she supports Kalai. Kalai reaches school again, and Abi supports him, but he decides not to love her again. During Aadhi's memorial, Kalai reveals his identity to everyone, and they are shocked. Gautham's gang mocks him, but he doesn't care. The whole school is disturbed by everything. Boodhalingam tries to bribe his way out of prison, but he fails and is sentenced to remand.

Praveen and Naveen decide to continue their weed business again, along with Madhan, who wants revenge for losing his SPL to Gautham. PT Sir spots one of the packets and reports it to Guna, but by the time they come, it's gone, as the duo have taken it. Gautham is assigned to find out who is smuggling weed. He assumes Kalai is responsible, and beats him up, but Kalai's gang defend him and argues with Gautham, criticising his judgment, and telling him that he has no right to talk about Kalai, as he himself went to drink at a bar. Gautham defends himself and claims that Kalai is his suspect due to his backstory and his coming from jail. Kalai tells him not to be hasty and tells him that he suspects Praveen and Naveen, due to his past battle with them.

Gautham reluctantly agrees, and soon enough, he manages to trick them into almost revealing their misdeeds. They panic and attempt to escape, but Attai Poochi, Guna, Malar and others catch them, while the cops arrive and arrest them.

That evening, Gautham goes to Kalai's hotel with his friends. They are unaware of why they are there. Gautham orders food and eats. Afterwards, his friends leave, and Gautham pays the bill, writing something down. Kalai takes it, and it says, "Sorry for Everything". Kalai goes out and sees Gautham walking. He calls him, and Gautham begins to apologise for everything. He tells him he never meant to be rude, but his situation made it as such. Kalai also apologises for not telling the truth earlier, and they finally end their enmity.

Malar and Guna boldly confront Naveen and Praveen in jail, delivering a firm message: it’s time to reform and abandon their destructive addiction to marijuana. Their visit is not just a casual encounter; it’s a wake-up call that demands reflection and change.

Meanwhile, the surprising revival of the friendship between Gautham and Kalai captivates the entire class, marking a significant shift in dynamics. As they come to terms with Aadhi’s absence, the group decisively embraces Manikandan, known as Fire Mani, integrating him into their tight-knit circle. United by their shared experiences, they prepare for the upcoming exams with determination and solidarity.

Madhan recognizes the need for accountability and takes a decisive step to apologize for his past misdeeds. The class grants him their forgiveness, collectively choosing to move forward and focus on their studies with a renewed sense of purpose. Following this transformative period, Guna and Malar seal their love in a wedding ceremony that’s a powerful reminder of commitment, with their supportive classmates standing by them.

Six years later, the group has evolved into accomplished individuals, each commanding their respective fields with confidence. Kalai has established himself as a formidable writer, crafting compelling stories that resonate deeply. Gautham and Abi stand united as a married couple, solidifying their partnership. Nandhini thrives as a dedicated doctor, while Chella captures attention as an exceptional actor. Vasanth and Vicky assert their vision as directors, navigating the competitive film industry with gusto. Pandi and Lavakushan are making a difference as food inspection officers, promoting public health with unwavering diligence. Manikandan fulfils his promise by providing for both his family and Aadhi’s, ensuring that their friendship continues to thrive.

In a pivotal reunion, Raju makes a decisive visit to Gautham and Abi, prompting a heartfelt reconciliation. They take this opportunity to reflect on their shared history and reaffirm their commitment to supporting Nandhini and Kalai in pursuing their passions. Acknowledging the complexities of their love lives, Nandhini and Kalai confront the reality of their family’s disapproval, yet they remain unwavering in their hopes for the future, ready to challenge the obstacles that lie ahead.

The second season concludes as PT sir calls out the next batch of students for Season 3.

== Series overview ==
=== Streaming ===
| Series | Episodes | Originally released | |
| Series | Episodes | First released | Last released |
|---|---|---|---|
| 1 | 132 | 22 April 2022 | 8 December 2022 |
| 2 | 112 | 21 April 2023 | 27 October 2023 |
| 3 | 102 | 30 August 2024 | 14 February 2025 |

=== Television broadcast ===
| Series | Episodes | Originally released | |
| Series | Episodes | First released | Last released |
|---|---|---|---|
| 1 | 132 | 26 December 2022 | 17 April 2023 |

== Cast and characters ==
=== Season 1-2 ===
==== Starring ====
- Bharath Kumar as Gunasekhar "Guna" (Malar’s love interest) (Main Protagonist)
- Sangeetha Sai (Season 1) / Parveen (Season 2-present) as Malar (Guna’s love interest) (Main Protagonist)
- Irfan as Vineeth alias "Jerry" (season 1)
- Aravinth Seiju as Kalaiarasan "Kalai" (Abi’s love interest) (Main Protagonist)
- Deepika Venkatachalam as Abirami "Abi" (Kalai’s love interest) (Season 1,2) (Main Protagonist)
- Raja Vetri Prabhu as Gautham (Nandhini’s love interest)(Season 1,2) (Sometimes Antagonist, Sometimes Protagonist)
- Teja Venkatesh as Nandhini (Gautham’s love interest) (Season 1,2)
- Aashik Gopinath as Krishnamoorthy "Kicha" (Season 1,2)

==== Supporting ====
- Vishwa Mithran as Rajeev "Raju" (Season 1,2)
- Aegan as Chellamuthu "Chella" (Season 1,2)
- KPY Surendar as Aadhisehan Ilavarasu "Aadhi", (died) (Season 1,2)
- Akshathaa Ajit as Stella (Season 1,2)
- VJ Kalyani (Season 1) / Preethi Krishnan (Season 2-present) as Shwetha (Season 1,2)
- Parvez Musharaf as Vicky (Season 1,2)
- Sathyanarayanan (Dolby Sathya)as Gopi (Season 1,2) (Antagonistically Sarcastic)
- Keerthan Subash as Vasanth "Dude", "English Erumai" (Season 1,2)
- Pragatheeswaran as Pandi a.k.a. Bakery Pandi (Season 1,2)
- Pranika (Season 1) / Abeneya Nethrun (Season 1,2) as Parvathy "Paru" (Kicha’s love interest)
- KPY Thidiyan as Kuzhandhaivelu " Kuzhandhai" (Season 1,2)
- Lavakushan as Lavakushan "Prachanai" (Season 1,2)
- Sathya SK as Santhosh Kumar "Santhosh Sir" (Dubbed by: Vignesh a.k.a. Vicky) (Season 2-present)
- Selva as Naveen (Season 2)
- Mona as Mathangi (Season 2)
- DK Karthikeyan as Praveen (Season 2) (Antagonist)
- Smeha Manimegalai as Sangeetha (Season 2)
- Naresh as Madhan (Season 2) (Antagonist)
- TSK as Bullet (Guna’s best friend)
- Rahul Vinod as Manikandan (Season 2)
- Samyuktha Shanmuganathan as Amritha (Season 2)
- Velu Lakshmanan (Aryan) as Raghu (season 1) (Main Antagonist)
- Rajmohan as PT Master
- Deepika Damu as Haritha (season 1)
- Preethiga as Preethi (season 1)
- Seetha Anil as Maariamma, Nandhini's mother (Season 1,2)
- Deepthi Shree as Devi, Nandhini's younger sister (Season 1,2)
- Bharath Mohan as Saravanan (Season 1,2)
- Kamalesh PK as Arvind, who is Abi's father (Season 1,2)
- Kavitha Solairaja as Abi's mother (Season 1,2) (Dubbed by: Meenalochani) (Side-Antagonist)
- Udhaya as Sagayam (Watchman)
- KPY Pazhani as Puchiappan a.k.a. Poochi Sir or Attai Poochi
- Priyanka Kumar as Tilottama Miss (Season 2)
- Boys Rajan as Bhairavan, School Principal of Siragugal School, Kanchipuram.
- Bharath Kalyan as Naachiyappan, Modern School Correspondent (Main Antagonist)
- Sanjay Mohan as Richie, Student of Modern School, Kanchipuram. (Season 1,2)
- Saro as Saro (Season 1,2)
- Ashika Yash as Ashika (Season 1,2)
- Vidur as Vidur
- Murali as Moile
- Maurish Frank as Ayogya
- Surya as Senior role
- Vishal Prabu as Senior role
- Monisha Ravishankar as Sanghavi, Jerry's close friend in school days (Episode 42)(archival footage of old Kana Kaanum Kaalangal)
- Rajesh as Mr. Sakthivel (Passed)
- Sandy Master as Judge (dance competition)
- Kalaiarasan as Judge(drama competition)
- MJ Sriram Parthasarathy as Judge (singing competition)
- Padmapriya as Judge
- Santhosh Prathap as Rockstar Ashok
- Mohan Vaidya as Tamil sir
- Anumohan as social sir
- R. Aravindraj as Maths sir
- Arun Prasath as himself
- Archana as herself
- Rithika Tamilselvi as herself
- Vazhakku Enn Muthuraman as Warden Jayakumar, who saves Kalai from the cruel Inspector Nagarajan (Season 1, 2)
- Murattu Pandian Babloo as Boodhalingam, a marijuana dealer and the arch-nemesis of Kalai, is responsible for the murder and incineration of Kalai's family. (Season 2) (Antagonist)
- Minor Yogi as Ravi, Boodhalingam's younger brother, whom Kalai killed. (Season 2) (Antagonist)
- Yusuf Ferozkhan as S. Kabilan IPS, Superintendent of Police, who is Santhosh Sir's friend during his IPS training in Hyderabad, who saves Kalai from Boodhalingam and arrests the latter. (Season 2) (Supporting Cast)
- Rameshkumar as Sultan Bhai, who runs a restaurant in Kanchipuram. (Season 1)
- Sai Gopi as A senior police officer who arrests Praveen and Naveen for the Marijuana Case. (Season 2)
- Tamil Selvi as Kalai's Mother (Season 2).
- Santhiya as Thenmozhi, Kalai's sister, who got assaulted and killed by Boodhalingam's brother Ravi (Season 2).
- VP Jegannathan as Pandi's father, who is a Bakery Owner.
- Guitar P. Manikandaraj as Gopi's Father, who is a Wine Shop Owner in [Kanchipuram].

=== Season 3 ===
- Bharath Kumar as Gunasekhar "Guna" (School Correspondent)
- Parveen (Season 2-present) as Malar (School Head Misters) Guna's wife
- Sathya SK as Santhosh Sir (Dubbed By: Aadhithya. M)
- Murali Radhakrishnan as Jeeva 11A Class Teacher & Biology Teacher
- Mounica as Vennila Chemistry Teacher
- Kiran Kondaa as Madan Physics Teacher
- Bhuvaneshwari Rameshbabu as Mahalakshmi "Maha"
- Sangeetha V as Rekha (Maha's mother)
- Aravinth Seiju as Kalaiarasan a.k.a. Writer Kalai (Maha's Guardian)(Extended Cameo)
- Suresh Chakravarthy as Pannaiyar
- Cool Suresh as Kaasi (Rekha's Manager)
- Aniiruth Kanakarajan as Karthik
- Sakthi Raj as Shakthi
- Vijay Duke as Sasikumar (from Madurai)
- Aneessh Sivashanmugham as Bujji Babu
- Jagabar Sathik as John
- Jasmine Praveen as Janani
- RK Dhanusha as Nikitha
- Baanumathi as Pooja Tiwari (from Rajasthan)
- Feroz as Magesh
- Prince Xavier as Ranjith
- Thafia AbuThahir as Madhi
- Dharshini as Yamini
- Aakarsha Sunil as Priya
- Ajith Kumar as Egambaram "Egs"
- Birla Bose as Dhinakaran (Karthik's Father, Kanchipuram Inspector)
- Arumugavel as Pazhani (Sakthi's Father, Police Constable)
- unknown as Shilpa (Girl's hostel warden)
- TSR -Dharmaraj as Tiger Muthuvel Pandiyan (Boys' hostel warden)
- Udhaya as Sagayam (Watchman)
- Kaadhal Sugumar as Sugu
- Prakash Rajan as Nikitha's Father who is also a teacher in Siragugal School (Dubbed by Arun Kumar)
- Pooja Fiya as Nikitha's Stepmother, who is also a teacher in Siragugal School.
- Udumalai Ravi as Bujji Babu's Father
- VP Jegannathan as Vaazhavandhaan, Sasi Kumar's Father in Madurai.

== Episodes ==
=== Season 1 ===
| No. | Title | Directed by | Written by | Original release date |
|---|---|---|---|---|
| 1 | "Back to School" | Ravi Kanna | Praveen Bennett | 22 April 2022 |
| 2 | "First Warning" | Ravi Kanna | Praveen Bennett | 22 April 2022 |
| 3 | "The Challenge" | Ravi Kanna | Praveen Bennett | 22 April 2022 |
| 4 | "To New Beginnings" | Ravi Kanna | Praveen Bennett | 22 April 2022 |
| 5 | "The Known Stranger" | Ravi Kanna | Praveen Bennett | 29 April 2022 |
| 6 | "Latecomer" | Ravi Kanna | Praveen Bennett | 29 April 2022 |
| 7 | "Heartfelt" | Ravi Kanna | Praveen Bennett | 29 April 2022 |
| 8 | "Ray Of Hope" | Ravi Kanna | Praveen Bennett | 6 May 2022 |
| 9 | "The Last Hope" | Ravi Kanna | Praveen Bennett | 6 May 2022 |
| 10 | "The Revenge" | Ravi Kanna | Praveen Bennett | 6 May 2022 |
| 11 | "The Rescuer" | Ravi Kanna | Praveen Bennett | 13 May 2022 |
| 12 | "Jerry's Arrival" | Ravi Kanna | Praveen Bennett | 13 May 2022 |
| 13 | "The First Impression" | Ravi Kanna | Praveen Bennett | 13 May 2022 |
| 14 | "The Missing Data" | Ravi Kanna | Praveen Bennett | 13 May 2022 |
| 15 | "Ray Of Light" | Ravi Kanna | Praveen Bennett | 20 May 2022 |
| 16 | "Siragugal's Hidden Gem" | Ravi Kanna | Praveen Bennett | 20 May 2022 |
| 17 | "Tragedy Strikes" | Ravi Kanna | Praveen Bennett | 20 May 2022 |
| 18 | "The Big Offer" | Ravi Kanna | Praveen Bennett | 20 May 2022 |
| 19 | "Teaming Up" | Ravi Kanna | Praveen Bennett | 27 May 2022 |
| 20 | "Trickster Principal" | Ravi Kanna | Praveen Bennett | 27 May 2022 |
| 21 | "The Trap" | Ravi Kanna | Praveen Bennett | 27 May 2022 |
| 22 | "An Unexpected Call" | Ravi Kanna | Praveen Bennett | 27 May 2022 |
| 23 | "The Viral Post" | Ravi Kanna | Praveen Bennett | 3 June 2022 |
| 24 | "The Second Warning" | Ravi Kanna | Praveen Bennett | 3 June 2022 |
| 25 | "Siragugal's Reunion" | Ravi Kanna | Praveen Bennett | 3 June 2022 |
| 26 | "An Uncertain Situation" | Ravi Kanna | Praveen Bennett | 3 June 2022 |
| 27 | "My Hero - Nandhini" | Ravi Kanna | Praveen Bennett | 10 June 2022 |
| 28 | "The Second Warning" | Ravi Kanna | Praveen Bennett | 10 June 2022 |
| 29 | "A Surprise Visit" | Ravi Kanna | Praveen Bennett | 10 June 2022 |
| 30 | "The Concern" | Ravi Kanna | Praveen Bennett | 10 June 2022 |
| 31 | "The Missing Document" | Ravi Kanna | Praveen Bennett | 17 June 2022 |
| 32 | "The Confession" | Ravi Kanna | Praveen Bennett | 17 June 2022 |
| 33 | "The Defaulters' List" | Ravi Kanna | Praveen Bennett | 17 June 2022 |
| 34 | "The Decision" | Ravi Kanna | Praveen Bennett | 17 June 2022 |
| 35 | "The Misfortune" | Ravi Kanna | Praveen Bennett | 24 June 2022 |
| 36 | "The Visit" | Ravi Kanna | Praveen Bennett | 24 June 2022 |
| 37 | "Twist And Turns" | Ravi Kanna | Praveen Bennett | 24 June 2022 |
| 38 | "Sakthivel's Death - The Promise" | Ravi Kanna | Praveen Bennett | 24 June 2022 |
| 39 | "The Next Correspondent" | Ravi Kanna | Praveen Bennett | 1 July 2022 |
| 40 | "Partner in Crime" | Ravi Kanna | Praveen Bennett | 1 July 2022 |
| 41 | "The Wrong Decision" | Ravi Kanna | Praveen Bennett | 1 July 2022 |
| 42 | "Saving Nandhini and Memories of Sanghavi" | Ravi Kanna | Praveen Bennett | 1 July 2022 |
| 43 | "The Aftermath" | Ravi Kanna | Praveen Bennett | 8 July 2022 |
| 44 | "The Parent-Teacher Meeting" | Ravi Kanna | Praveen Bennett | 8 July 2022 |
| 45 | "The Remembrance" | Ravi Kanna | Praveen Bennett | 8 July 2022 |
| 46 | "Attai Poochi's Nightmare" | Ravi Kanna | Praveen Bennett | 8 July 2022 |
| 47 | "The Need" | Ravi Kanna | Praveen Bennett | 15 July 2022 |
| 48 | "A Conviction" | Ravi Kanna | Praveen Bennett | 15 July 2022 |
| 49 | "Smart Poochi 2.0" | Ravi Kanna | Praveen Bennett | 15 July 2022 |
| 50 | "The Support System" | Ravi Kanna | Praveen Bennett | 15 July 2022 |
| 51 | "The Forgotten Subject" | Ravi Kanna | Praveen Bennett | 22 July 2022 |
| 52 | "The Surprise" | Ravi Kanna | Praveen Bennett | 22 July 2022 |
| 53 | "The Reminiscence" | Ravi Kanna | Praveen Bennett | 22 July 2022 |
| 54 | "The Great Escape" | Ravi Kanna | Praveen Bennett | 22 July 2022 |
| 55 | "Gowtham's Treat" | Ravi Kanna | Praveen Bennett | 29 July 2022 |
| 56 | "The Special Cake" | Ravi Kanna | Praveen Bennett | 29 July 2022 |
| 57 | "The Quotation" | Ravi Kanna | Praveen Bennett | 29 July 2022 |
| 58 | "A Tough Challenge" | Ravi Kanna | Praveen Bennett | 29 July 2022 |
| 59 | "The Wicked Nachiyappan" | Ravi Kanna | Praveen Bennett | 5 August 2022 |
| 60 | "The Rift" | Ravi Kanna | Praveen Bennett | 5 August 2022 |
| 61 | "The Admission Campaign" | Ravi Kanna | Praveen Bennett | 5 August 2022 |
| 62 | "Madhavan and the Modern School" | Ravi Kanna | Praveen Bennett | 5 August 2022 |
| 63 | "The Uproar" | Ravi Kanna | Praveen Bennett | 12 August 2022 |
| 64 | "The New Rivals" | Ravi Kanna | Praveen Bennett | 12 August 2022 |
| 65 | "A Ticket to Team Up" | Ravi Kanna | Praveen Bennett | 12 August 2022 |
| 66 | "The Confrontation" | Ravi Kanna | Praveen Bennett | 12 August 2022 |
| 67 | "A New Entry" | Ravi Kanna | Praveen Bennett | 19 August 2022 |
| 68 | "Principal vs Jerry" | Ravi Kanna | Praveen Bennett | 19 August 2022 |
| 69 | "The Informant" | Ravi Kanna | Praveen Bennett | 19 August 2022 |
| 70 | "The Preparation" | Ravi Kanna | Praveen Bennett | 19 August 2022 |
| 71 | "Strategy or Luck?" | Ravi Kanna | Praveen Bennett | 26 August 2022 |
| 72 | "A Shocker for Gowtham" | Ravi Kanna | Praveen Bennett | 26 August 2022 |
| 73 | "Zero to Hero" | Ravi Kanna | Praveen Bennett | 26 August 2022 |
| 74 | "A Friend in Need" | Ravi Kanna | Praveen Bennett | 26 August 2022 |
| 75 | "An Unexpected Announcement" | Ravi Kanna | Praveen Bennett | 2 September 2022 |
| 76 | "Cupid, Cupid, Being Stupid" | Ravi Kanna | Praveen Bennett | 2 September 2022 |
| 77 | "Gang Wars" | Ravi Kanna | Praveen Bennett | 2 September 2022 |
| 78 | "The Hidden Gem" | Ravi Kanna | Praveen Bennett | 2 September 2022 |
| 79 | "Guardian Angel and the Dancing Devil" | Ravi Kanna | Praveen Bennett | 9 September 2022 |
| 80 | "The Lost Legend" | Ravi Kanna | Praveen Bennett | 9 September 2022 |
| 81 | "The Broken Heart" | Ravi Kanna | Praveen Bennett | 9 September 2022 |
| 82 | "Unity Is Strength" | Ravi Kanna | Praveen Bennett | 9 September 2022 |
| 83 | "Welcome to Modern School" | Ravi Kanna | Praveen Bennett | 16 September 2022 |
| 84 | "The Battle Begins" | Ravi Kanna | Praveen Bennett | 16 September 2022 |
| 85 | "The First Victory" | Ravi Kanna | Praveen Bennett | 16 September 2022 |
| 86 | "Rise of the King" | Ravi Kanna | Praveen Bennett | 16 September 2022 |
| 87 | "A Storm Awaits" | Ravi Kanna | Praveen Bennett | 23 September 2022 |
| 88 | "A Star-studded Performance" | Ravi Kanna | Praveen Bennett | 23 September 2022 |
| 89 | "Hardwork Never Fails" | Ravi Kanna | Praveen Bennett | 23 September 2022 |
| 90 | "The Evil Plot" | Ravi Kanna | Praveen Bennett | 23 September 2022 |
| 91 | "Good Always Prevails" | Ravi Kanna | Praveen Bennett | 30 September 2022 |
| 92 | "Willpower Is the Superpower" | Ravi Kanna | Praveen Bennett | 30 September 2022 |
| 93 | "The Judgement Day" | Ravi Kanna | Praveen Bennett | 30 September 2022 |
| 94 | "You Reap What You Sow" | Ravi Kanna | Praveen Bennett | 30 September 2022 |
| 95 | "Ghost from the Past" | Ravi Kanna | Praveen Bennett | 7 October 2022 |
| 96 | "Trapped" | Ravi Kanna | Praveen Bennett | 7 October 2022 |
| 97 | "The Disappointment" | Ravi Kanna | Praveen Bennett | 7 October 2022 |
| 98 | "The Missing" | Ravi Kanna | Praveen Bennett | 7 October 2022 |
| 99 | "In Search of the Past" | Ravi Kanna | Praveen Bennett | 14 October 2022 |
| 100 | "Find the Past to Fight the Present" | Ravi Kanna | Praveen Bennett | 14 October 2022 |
| 101 | "Cover Your Tracks" | Ravi Kanna | Praveen Bennett | 14 October 2022 |
| 102 | "The Failed Attempt" | Ravi Kanna | Praveen Bennett | 14 October 2022 |
| 103 | "Suspicion" | Ravi Kanna | Praveen Bennett | 21 October 2022 |
| 104 | "The Latest Challenge" | Ravi Kanna | Praveen Bennett | 21 October 2022 |
| 105 | "A Smart Solution" | Ravi Kanna | Praveen Bennett | 21 October 2022 |
| 106 | "The Missing Link" | Ravi Kanna | Praveen Bennett | 21 October 2022 |
| 107 | "The Final Piece of the Puzzle" | Ravi Kanna | Praveen Bennett | 28 October 2022 |
| 108 | "The Game Changer" | Ravi Kanna | Praveen Bennett | 28 October 2022 |
| 109 | "A Narrow Escape" | Ravi Kanna | Praveen Bennett | 28 October 2022 |
| 110 | "The Power of Friendship" | Ravi Kanna | Praveen Bennett | 28 October 2022 |
| 111 | "The Healing" | Ravi Kanna | Praveen Bennett | 4 November 2022 |
| 112 | "Teachers in Distress" | Ravi Kanna | Praveen Bennett | 4 November 2022 |
| 113 | "The Protest" | Ravi Kanna | Praveen Bennett | 4 November 2022 |
| 114 | "A Warm Welcome" | Ravi Kanna | Praveen Bennett | 4 November 2022 |
| 115 | "The Unwilling Bride" | Ravi Kanna | Praveen Bennett | 11 November 2022 |
| 116 | "Parvathy's SOS" | Ravi Kanna | Praveen Bennett | 11 November 2022 |
| 117 | "Hard Work or Smart Work?" | Ravi Kanna | Praveen Bennett | 11 November 2022 |
| 118 | "Justice is Served" | Ravi Kanna | Praveen Bennett | 11 November 2022 |
| 119 | "Right and Wrong" | Ravi Kanna | Praveen Bennett | 18 November 2022 |
| 120 | "Fueling the Fire" | Ravi Kanna | Praveen Bennett | 18 November 2022 |
| 121 | "A Wolf in a Sheep's Clothing" | Ravi Kanna | Praveen Bennett | 18 November 2022 |
| 122 | "A Miracle" | Ravi Kanna | Praveen Bennett | 18 November 2022 |
| 123 | "Old is Gold" | Ravi Kanna | Praveen Bennett | 25 November 2022 |
| 124 | "New Experience" | Ravi Kanna | Praveen Bennett | 25 November 2022 |
| 125 | "Learnnig with Ease" | Ravi Kanna | Praveen Bennett | 25 November 2022 |
| 126 | "The Special Class" | Ravi Kanna | Praveen Bennett | 25 November 2022 |
| 127 | "The Chemistry" | Ravi Kanna | Praveen Bennett | 2 December 2022 |
| 128 | "A Bittersweet Day" | Ravi Kanna | Praveen Bennett | 2 December 2022 |
| 129 | "The Bet" | Ravi Kanna | Praveen Bennett | 2 December 2022 |
| 130 | "Plan B" | Ravi Kanna | Praveen Bennett | 9 December 2022 |
| 131 | "The Stroke" | Ravi Kanna | Praveen Bennett | 9 December 2022 |
| 132 | "The Start of New Beginning" | Ravi Kanna | Praveen Bennett | 9 December 2022 |

=== Season 2 ===
| No. | Title | Directed by | Written by | Original release date |
|---|---|---|---|---|
| 1 | "Dreamy Day" | Ravi Kanna | Praveen Bennett | 21 April 2023 |
| 2 | "The Result" | Ravi Kanna | Praveen Bennett | 21 April 2023 |
| 3 | "Time To Celebrate" | Ravi Kanna | Praveen Bennett | 21 April 2023 |
| 4 | "Family Comes First" | Ravi Kanna | Praveen Bennett | 21 April 2023 |
| 5 | "Failed Attempts" | Ravi Kanna | Praveen Bennett | 28 April 2023 |
| 6 | "New Entries" | Ravi Kanna | Praveen Bennett | 28 April 2023 |
| 7 | "New Friends, New Enemies" | Ravi Kanna | Praveen Bennett | 28 April 2023 |
| 8 | "The Lab Accident" | Ravi Kanna | Praveen Bennett | 28 April 2023 |
| 9 | "A Father's Anger" | Ravi Kanna | Praveen Bennett | 5 May 2023 |
| 10 | "Respect" | Ravi Kanna | Praveen Bennett | 5 May 2023 |
| 11 | "The Offer" | Ravi Kanna | Praveen Bennett | 5 May 2023 |
| 12 | "He Is Back" | Ravi Kanna | Praveen Bennett | 5 May 2023 |
| 13 | "Blast From The Past" | Ravi Kanna | Praveen Bennett | 12 May 2023 |
| 14 | "The Outcast!" | Ravi Kanna | Praveen Bennett | 12 May 2023 |
| 15 | "Who Is The Culprit?" | Ravi Kanna | Praveen Bennett | 12 May 2023 |
| 16 | "The Birthday Surprise" | Ravi Kanna | Praveen Bennett | 12 May 2023 |
| 17 | "The Video" | Ravi Kanna | Praveen Bennett | 19 May 2023 |
| 18 | "Rising Without Fear" | Ravi Kanna | Praveen Bennett | 19 May 2023 |
| 19 | "The Candidates" | Ravi Kanna | Praveen Bennett | 19 May 2023 |
| 20 | "The Nominations" | Ravi Kanna | Praveen Bennett | 19 May 2023 |
| 21 | "Spoken Thanglish" | Ravi Kanna | Praveen Bennett | 26 May 2023 |
| 22 | "Election Rules" | Ravi Kanna | Praveen Bennett | 26 May 2023 |
| 23 | "The Wall of Siragugal" | Ravi Kanna | Praveen Bennett | 26 May 2023 |
| 24 | "The Cost of the Fight" | Ravi Kanna | Praveen Bennett | 26 May 2023 |
| 25 | "Timely Help" | Ravi Kanna | Praveen Bennett | 2 June 2023 |
| 26 | "Where Is The Money?" | Ravi Kanna | Praveen Bennett | 2 June 2023 |
| 27 | "Abi To The Rescue" | Ravi Kanna | Praveen Bennett | 2 June 2023 |
| 28 | "The Election Task" | Ravi Kanna | Praveen Bennett | 2 June 2023 |
| 29 | "The Stolen Speech" | Ravi Kanna | Praveen Bennett | 9 June 2023 |
| 30 | "Broken Trust and Broken Heart" | Ravi Kanna | Praveen Bennett | 9 June 2023 |
| 31 | "Friends Forever" | Ravi Kanna | Praveen Bennett | 9 June 2023 |
| 32 | "The Voting" | Ravi Kanna | Praveen Bennett | 9 June 2023 |
| 33 | "The Counting Begins" | Ravi Kanna | Praveen Bennett | 16 June 2023 |
| 34 | "The Unexpected Winner" | Ravi Kanna | Praveen Bennett | 16 June 2023 |
| 35 | "The Aftereffects" | Ravi Kanna | Praveen Bennett | 16 June 2023 |
| 36 | "The Deposit Money" | Ravi Kanna | Praveen Bennett | 16 June 2023 |
| 37 | "Unknown Gangsters" | Ravi Kanna | Praveen Bennett | 23 June 2023 |
| 38 | "The Expulsion" | Ravi Kanna | Praveen Bennett | 23 June 2023 |
| 39 | "Saved with a Condition" | Ravi Kanna | Praveen Bennett | 23 June 2023 |
| 40 | "Kalai's Explanation" | Ravi Kanna | Praveen Bennett | 23 June 2023 |
| 41 | "Cozened" | Ravi Kanna | Praveen Bennett | 30 June 2023 |
| 42 | "The Tour Idea" | Ravi Kanna | Praveen Bennett | 30 June 2023 |
| 43 | "Group Study" | Ravi Kanna | Praveen Bennett | 30 June 2023 |
| 44 | "Conditions Apply" | Ravi Kanna | Praveen Bennett | 30 June 2023 |
| 45 | "Twisted Plan" | Ravi Kanna | Praveen Bennett | 7 July 2023 |
| 46 | "Exam Situation" | Ravi Kanna | Praveen Bennett | 7 July 2023 |
| 47 | "Surprise Invigilater" | Ravi Kanna | Praveen Bennett | 7 July 2023 |
| 48 | "The Marks" | Ravi Kanna | Praveen Bennett | 7 July 2023 |
| 49 | "Sponsored Student" | Ravi Kanna | Praveen Bennett | 14 July 2023 |
| 50 | "The News" | Ravi Kanna | Praveen Bennett | 14 July 2023 |
| 51 | "Total Disappointment" | Ravi Kanna | Praveen Bennett | 14 July 2023 |
| 52 | "Guna to the Rescue" | Ravi Kanna | Praveen Bennett | 14 July 2023 |
| 53 | "The Antidote" | Ravi Kanna | Praveen Bennett | 21 July 2023 |
| 54 | "Unheard Emotions" | Ravi Kanna | Praveen Bennett | 21 July 2023 |
| 55 | "Tour Incharge" | Ravi Kanna | Praveen Bennett | 21 July 2023 |
| 56 | "The Journey Begins" | Ravi Kanna | Praveen Bennett | 21 July 2023 |
| 57 | "The Arrival" | Ravi Kanna | Praveen Bennett | 28 July 2023 |
| 58 | "A Lover's Struggle" | Ravi Kanna | Praveen Bennett | 28 July 2023 |
| 59 | "The Accidental Heroine" | Ravi Kanna | Praveen Bennett | 28 July 2023 |
| 60 | "Reneging Promises" | Ravi Kanna | Praveen Bennett | 28 July 2023 |
| 61 | "Love at First Sight" | Ravi Kanna | Praveen Bennett | 4 August 2023 |
| 62 | "The Dead Lovers" | Ravi Kanna | Praveen Bennett | 4 August 2023 |
| 63 | "Swept Off His Feet" | Ravi Kanna | Praveen Bennett | 4 August 2023 |
| 64 | "The Misunderstood Hero" | Ravi Kanna | Praveen Bennett | 4 August 2023 |
| 65 | "Incomplete Conversations" | Ravi Kanna | Praveen Bennett | 11 August 2023 |
| 66 | "Sports Day" | Ravi Kanna | Praveen Bennett | 11 August 2023 |
| 67 | "The Hesitation" | Ravi Kanna | Praveen Bennett | 11 August 2023 |
| 68 | "The Engagement Gets Interrupted" | Ravi Kanna | Praveen Bennett | 11 August 2023 |
| 69 | "An Possessive Abi" | Ravi Kanna | Praveen Bennett | 18 August 2023 |
| 70 | "The Thiruvizha" | Ravi Kanna | Praveen Bennett | 18 August 2023 |
| 71 | "The Accidental Performers" | Ravi Kanna | Praveen Bennett | 18 August 2023 |
| 72 | "The Haunting Truth" | Ravi Kanna | Praveen Bennett | 18 August 2023 |
| 73 | "Rebellious Sister" | Ravi Kanna | Praveen Bennett | 25 August 2023 |
| 74 | "Wrath Unleashed" | Ravi Kanna | Praveen Bennett | 25 August 2023 |
| 75 | "War of Words" | Ravi Kanna | Praveen Bennett | 25 August 2023 |
| 76 | "Mother's Anger" | Ravi Kanna | Praveen Bennett | 25 August 2023 |
| 77 | "The Unexpected Blood Donor" | Ravi Kanna | Praveen Bennett | 1 September 2023 |
| 78 | "Angel of Sports" | Ravi Kanna | Praveen Bennett | 1 September 2023 |
| 79 | "It's All About Sports" | Ravi Kanna | Praveen Bennett | 1 September 2023 |
| 80 | "Heartwarming Apologies" | Ravi Kanna | Praveen Bennett | 1 September 2023 |
| 81 | "The List of Names" | Ravi Kanna | Praveen Bennett | 8 September 2023 |
| 82 | "The True SPL" | Ravi Kanna | Praveen Bennett | 8 September 2023 |
| 83 | "The Practice Sessions" | Ravi Kanna | Praveen Bennett | 8 September 2023 |
| 84 | "Inauguration of the Sports Day" | Ravi Kanna | Praveen Bennett | 8 September 2023 |
| 85 | "United We Run" | Ravi Kanna | Praveen Bennett | 15 September 2023 |
| 86 | "Bruce Lee Kicha" | Ravi Kanna | Praveen Bennett | 15 September 2023 |
| 87 | "District Record" | Ravi Kanna | Praveen Bennett | 15 September 2023 |
| 88 | "True Champions" | Ravi Kanna | Praveen Bennett | 15 September 2023 |
| 89 | "The Victory" | Ravi Kanna | Praveen Bennett | 22 September 2023 |
| 90 | "Hurtful Silence" | Ravi Kanna | Praveen Bennett | 22 September 2023 |
| 91 | "Targeted" | Ravi Kanna | Praveen Bennett | 22 September 2023 |
| 92 | "Victim of Fate" | Ravi Kanna | Praveen Bennett | 22 September 2023 |
| 93 | "Dark Death" | Ravi Kanna | Praveen Bennett | 29 September 2023 |
| 94 | "Untold Story" | Ravi Kanna | Praveen Bennett | 29 September 2023 |
| 95 | "Wrong Target" | Ravi Kanna | Praveen Bennett | 29 September 2023 |
| 96 | "Facing the Enemy" | Ravi Kanna | Praveen Bennett | 29 September 2023 |
| 97 | "Ruthless Abduction" | Ravi Kanna | Praveen Bennett | 6 October 2023 |
| 98 | "Wounded Hearts" | Ravi Kanna | Praveen Bennett | 6 October 2023 |
| 99 | "Past Unveiled" | Ravi Kanna | Praveen Bennett | 6 October 2023 |
| 100 | "Broken Bonds" | Ravi Kanna | Praveen Bennett | 6 October 2023 |
| 101 | "Accidental Discovery" | Ravi Kanna | Praveen Bennett | 13 October 2023 |
| 102 | "The Hunt" | Ravi Kanna | Praveen Bennett | 13 October 2023 |
| 103 | "Enemies to Friends" | Ravi Kanna | Praveen Bennett | 13 October 2023 |
| 104 | "Unmendable Mistakes" | Ravi Kanna | Praveen Bennett | 13 October 2023 |
| 105 | "Cheerful Moments" | Ravi Kanna | Praveen Bennett | 20 October 2023 |
| 106 | "The Farewell Day" | Ravi Kanna | Praveen Bennett | 20 October 2023 |
| 107 | "Emotional Speeches" | Ravi Kanna | Praveen Bennett | 20 October 2023 |
| 108 | "Hard to Say Goodbye" | Ravi Kanna | Praveen Bennett | 20 October 2023 |
| 109 | "The Final Exam" | Ravi Kanna | Praveen Bennett | 27 October 2023 |
| 110 | "Last Day at School" | Ravi Kanna | Praveen Bennett | 27 October 2023 |
| 111 | "Just Married" | Ravi Kanna | Praveen Bennett | 27 October 2023 |
| 112 | "The End Is Just the Beginning" | Ravi Kanna | Praveen Bennett | 27 October 2023 |

=== Season 3 ===
| No. | Title | Directed by | Written by | Original release date |
|---|---|---|---|---|
| 1 | "Roses on Thorns" | Nitiz Maz | Praveen Bennett | 30 August 2024 |
| 2 | "Gates of Hope" | Nitiz Maz | Praveen Bennett | 30 August 2024 |
| 3 | "Best Enemies" | Nitiz Maz | Praveen Bennett | 30 August 2024 |
| 4 | "New Class, New Stories" | Nitiz Maz | Praveen Bennett | 30 August 2024 |
| 5 | "Different Parenting" | Nitiz Maz | Praveen Bennett | 6 September 2024 |
| 6 | "Rep Elections" | Nitiz Maz | Praveen Bennett | 6 September 2024 |
| 7 | "Haunted Hostel" | Nitiz Maz | Praveen Bennett | 6 September 2024 |
| 8 | "Double Twin Flames" | Nitiz Maz | Praveen Bennett | 6 September 2024 |
| 9 | "Unexpected Candidates" | Nitiz Maz | Praveen Bennett | 13 September 2024 |
| 10 | "Physics VS Chemistry" | Nitiz Maz | Praveen Bennett | 13 September 2024 |
| 11 | "Family Promises" | Nitiz Maz | Praveen Bennett | 13 September 2024 |
| 12 | "Sakthi Or Maha" | Nitiz Maz | Praveen Bennett | 13 September 2024 |
| 13 | "Bullet is Back" | Nitiz Maz | Praveen Bennett | 20 September 2024 |
| 14 | "Reality Check" | Nitiz Maz | Praveen Bennett | 20 September 2024 |
| 15 | "Bitter Past" | Nitiz Maz | Praveen Bennett | 20 September 2024 |
| 16 | "How to save Siragugal?" | Nitiz Maz | Praveen Bennett | 20 September 2024 |
| 17 | "Attack Mode" | Vijay Kumar Rajendran | Praveen Bennett | 27 September 2024 |
| 18 | "Consequences" | Vijay Kumar Rajendran | Praveen Bennett | 27 September 2024 |
| 19 | "The Spotlight" | Vijay Kumar Rajendran | Praveen Bennett | 27 September 2024 |
| 20 | "Impactful Street Play" | Vijay Kumar Rajendran | Praveen Bennett | 27 September 2024 |
| 21 | "Narrow Escape" | Vijay Kumar Rajendran | Praveen Bennett | 4 October 2024 |
| 22 | "Hunger Strike" | Vijay Kumar Rajendran | Praveen Bennett | 4 October 2024 |
| 23 | "The Boys are Back" | Vijay Kumar Rajendran | Praveen Bennett | 4 October 2024 |
| 24 | "The Sacrifices" | Vijay Kumar Rajendran | Praveen Bennett | 4 October 2024 |
| 25 | "Court Order" | Vijay Kumar Rajendran | Praveen Bennett | 11 October 2024 |
| 26 | "Conceited Attitude" | Vijay Kumar Rajendran | Praveen Bennett | 11 October 2024 |
| 27 | "Bold Class Rep" | Vijay Kumar Rajendran | Praveen Bennett | 11 October 2024 |
| 28 | "Eavesdropping" | Vijay Kumar Rajendran | Praveen Bennett | 11 October 2024 |
| 29 | "Bujji's Efforts" | Vijay Kumar Rajendran | Praveen Bennett | 18 October 2024 |
| 30 | "Insulted Father" | Vijay Kumar Rajendran | Praveen Bennett | 18 October 2024 |
| 31 | "The Question Paper" | Vijay Kumar Rajendran | Praveen Bennett | 18 October 2024 |
| 32 | "Exam Preparations" | Vijay Kumar Rajendran | Praveen Bennett | 18 October 2024 |
| 33 | "Exam Day" | Vijay Kumar Rajendran | Praveen Bennett | 25 October 2024 |
| 34 | "Manipulated Scores" | Vijay Kumar Rajendran | Praveen Bennett | 25 October 2024 |
| 35 | "Cheaters Always Losers" | Vijay Kumar Rajendran | Praveen Bennett | 25 October 2024 |
| 36 | "Supreased Truth" | Vijay Kumar Rajendran | Praveen Bennett | 25 October 2024 |
| 37 | "The Parents' Meeting" | Vijay Kumar Rajendran | Praveen Bennett | 1 November 2024 |
| 38 | "Guilty Until Proven Innocent" | Vijay Kumar Rajendran | Praveen Bennett | 1 November 2024 |
| 39 | "Silenced by Punishment" | Vijay Kumar Rajendran | Praveen Bennett | 1 November 2024 |
| 40 | "Humiliation and Shame" | Vijay Kumar Rajendran | Praveen Bennett | 1 November 2024 |
| 41 | "The Ignored Gang" | Vijay Kumar Rajendran | Praveen Bennett | 8 November 2024 |
| 42 | "The Cultural Event" | Vijay Kumar Rajendran | Praveen Bennett | 8 November 2024 |
| 43 | "Impromptu Speech" | Vijay Kumar Rajendran | Praveen Bennett | 8 November 2024 |
| 44 | "Intellectual Theft" | Vijay Kumar Rajendran | Praveen Bennett | 8 November 2024 |
| 45 | "Authoritative Parenting" | Vijay Kumar Rajendran | Praveen Bennett | 15 November 2024 |
| 46 | "Caged Bird" | Vijay Kumar Rajendran | Praveen Bennett | 15 November 2024 |
| 47 | "Failed Efforts" | Vijay Kumar Rajendran | Praveen Bennett | 15 November 2024 |
| 48 | "Never Give Up" | Vijay Kumar Rajendran | Praveen Bennett | 15 November 2024 |
| 49 | "Overall Trophy" | Vijay Kumar Rajendran | Praveen Bennett | 22 November 2024 |
| 50 | "Shattered Reality" | Vijay Kumar Rajendran | Praveen Bennett | 22 November 2024 |
| 51 | "Still Not Friends" | Vijay Kumar Rajendran | Praveen Bennett | 22 November 2024 |
| 52 | "Misunderstood by Friends" | Vijay Kumar Rajendran | Praveen Bennett | 22 November 2024 |
| 53 | "Lonesome" | Vijay Kumar Rajendran | Praveen Bennett | 29 November 2024 |
| 54 | "Trouble Child" | Vijay Kumar Rajendran | Praveen Bennett | 29 November 2024 |
| 55 | "Bonding with Friends" | Vijay Kumar Rajendran | Praveen Bennett | 29 November 2024 |
| 56 | "Risky Wish" | Vijay Kumar Rajendran | Praveen Bennett | 29 November 2024 |
| 57 | "The Great Escape" | Vijay Kumar Rajendran | Praveen Bennett | 6 December 2024 |
| 58 | "Unexpected Opportunity" | Vijay Kumar Rajendran | Praveen Bennett | 6 December 2024 |
| 59 | "Supportive Friends" | Vijay Kumar Rajendran | Praveen Bennett | 6 December 2024 |
| 60 | "The Invite" | Vijay Kumar Rajendran | Praveen Bennett | 6 December 2024 |
| 61 | "Parents' consent" | Vijay Kumar Rajendran | Praveen Bennett | 13 December 2024 |
| 62 | "Boarding Time" | Vijay Kumar Rajendran | Praveen Bennett | 13 December 2024 |
| 63 | "The Journey" | Vijay Kumar Rajendran | Praveen Bennett | 13 December 2024 |
| 64 | "Sasi's Girl" | Vijay Kumar Rajendran | Praveen Bennett | 13 December 2024 |
| 65 | "Disappointing Menu" | Vijay Kumar Rajendran | Praveen Bennett | 20 December 2024 |
| 66 | "No Religious Barriers" | Vijay Kumar Rajendran | Praveen Bennett | 20 December 2024 |
| 67 | "Movie Time" | Vijay Kumar Rajendran | Praveen Bennett | 20 December 2024 |
| 68 | "The Missing Goat" | Vijay Kumar Rajendran | Praveen Bennett | 20 December 2024 |
| 69 | "Supernatural Search" | Vijay Kumar Rajendran | Praveen Bennett | 27 December 2024 |
| 70 | "Loving Granny" | Vijay Kumar Rajendran | Praveen Bennett | 27 December 2024 |
| 71 | "Granny's Unexpected Decision" | Vijay Kumar Rajendran | Praveen Bennett | 27 December 2024 |
| 72 | "Sasi's Ear piercing" | Vijay Kumar Rajendran | Praveen Bennett | 27 December 2024 |
| 73 | "Surprise Trip" | Vijay Kumar Rajendran | Praveen Bennett | 3 January 2025 |
| 74 | "Thug Life" | Vijay Kumar Rajendran | Praveen Bennett | 3 January 2025 |
| 75 | "Eerie Stories" | Vijay Kumar Rajendran | Praveen Bennett | 3 January 2025 |
| 76 | "Arson" | Vijay Kumar Rajendran | Praveen Bennett | 3 January 2025 |
| 77 | "Shattered Parents" | Vijay Kumar Rajendran | Praveen Bennett | 10 January 2025 |
| 78 | "Master Returns" | Vijay Kumar Rajendran | Praveen Bennett | 10 January 2025 |
| 79 | "New Feelings" | Vijay Kumar Rajendran | Praveen Bennett | 10 January 2025 |
| 80 | "Gang Reputation" | Vijay Kumar Rajendran | Praveen Bennett | 10 January 2025 |
| 81 | "Acceptance" | Vijay Kumar Rajendran | Praveen Bennett | 17 January 2025 |
| 82 | "Broken Bond" | Vijay Kumar Rajendran | Praveen Bennett | 17 January 2025 |
| 83 | "Growing Distance" | Vijay Kumar Rajendran | Praveen Bennett | 17 January 2025 |
| 84 | "Is It Love?" | Vijay Kumar Rajendran | Praveen Bennett | 17 January 2025 |
| 85 | "Budding Director" | Vijay Kumar Rajendran | Praveen Bennett | 24 January 2025 |
| 86 | "Madhi's Proposal" | Vijay Kumar Rajendran | Praveen Bennett | 24 January 2025 |
| 87 | "The Super Singer" | Vijay Kumar Rajendran | Praveen Bennett | 24 January 2025 |
| 88 | "A Short Film by Karthick" | Vijay Kumar Rajendran | Praveen Bennett | 24 January 2025 |
| 89 | "The Abduction" | Vijay Kumar Rajendran | Praveen Bennett | 31 January 2025 |
| 90 | "Helpless Maha" | Vijay Kumar Rajendran | Praveen Bennett | 31 January 2025 |
| 91 | "Locked Up" | Vijay Kumar Rajendran | Praveen Bennett | 31 January 2025 |
| 92 | "Smart Thinking" | Vijay Kumar Rajendran | Praveen Bennett | 31 January 2025 |
| 93 | "Brave Souls" | Vijay Kumar Rajendran | Praveen Bennett | 7 February 2025 |
| 94 | "Reap What You Sow" | Vijay Kumar Rajendran | Praveen Bennett | 7 February 2025 |
| 95 | "Science Projects" | Vijay Kumar Rajendran | Praveen Bennett | 7 February 2025 |
| 96 | "Best Friends Forever" | Vijay Kumar Rajendran | Praveen Bennett | 7 February 2025 |
| 97 | "The Innocent Suspect" | Vijay Kumar Rajendran | Praveen Bennett | 14 February 2025 |
| 98 | "The Truth" | Vijay Kumar Rajendran | Praveen Bennett | 14 February 2025 |
| 99 | "A Bold Move" | Vijay Kumar Rajendran | Praveen Bennett | 14 February 2025 |
| 100 | "The Confession" | Vijay Kumar Rajendran | Praveen Bennett | 14 February 2025 |
| 101 | "Truth Alone Triumphs" | M. Ramesh Baarathi | Praveen Bennett | 14 February 2025 |
| 102 | "Friendship is the Real Treasure" | M. Ramesh Baarathi | Praveen Bennett | 14 February 2025 |

== Production ==
=== Release ===
The first teaser for the show was released in January 2022 and it was officially set to launch in February 2022, however due to some technical error during the shooting for the show, the release date was pushed to 22 April 2022.
