= Aravinth Seiju =

Indian film actor

- Born: Aravinth Selvaraj; 1 January 1995 (age 31); Vadugapalayam, Pollachi, Tamil Nadu, India
- Other names: Aravinth Vimal Vijay, Seiju, Kalai, Chozhan
- Occupations: Actor; Television presenter
- Years active: 2017-present
- Known for: Blacksheep; Kana Kaanum Kaalangal; Ayyanar Thunai
- Spouse: Sangeetha Sai (m. 2025)

Aravinth Seiju (born 1 January 1995) is an actor, director and television presenter, who appears in Tamil language films and TV series, in particular in the role of Kalai in Kana Kaanum Kaalangal and as Chozhan in Ayyanar Thunai.

== Early life and family ==
Seiju was born on 1 January 1995 in Vadugapalayam, Pollachi, Coimbatore district. His father, Selvaraj, was a vegetable mediator, and his mother, Sumathi Selvaraj, was a homemaker. He has an elder brother named Arun Vijay. He completed schooling at Bharatiya Vidya Mandir, Pollachi. He earned a Bachelor's degree in computer science engineering from Sri Krishna College of Technology, Pollachi. He married actress Sangeetha Sai on 2 February 2025.

== Career ==
Seiju took part in various cultural events and performed mimicry and hosted multiple events as emcee during his college years. After completing his studies, he moved to Chennai to pursue his career in cinema and television. During his initial days in Chennai, he struggled a lot along with his best friend Vishnu while pursuing their career in cinema by attending auditions in various channels and was rejected then. Then they joined the Blacksheep youtube channel, owned by RJ Vigneshkanth, and started their journey in media. He started his career as Video Jockey along with his friend Vishnu in TV Potti Show, a satire show based on the tamil television serials and shows, that streamed on the Blacksheep Youtube Channel. Seiju learnt filmmaking and acting and undertook many roles in the channel, including being an artist, script writer, show producer, VJ and acted in short films, also called as random videos by the channel. Then he got minor roles in films such as Thuppakki Munai, Jai Bhim and Nenjamundu Nermaiyundu Odu Raja, working as an assistant director during the initial shoot of the latter. Seiju also performed in a stage play called Navayuga Rathakanneer along with Blacksheep team, which took place in various cities of Tamil Nadu and gained critical acclaim. He has also worked as a backend technician in major events and shows related to the film industry such as Ilayaraja 75, Audio launch function of the tamil movie Sarkar and various events that were organized by Blacksheep team. In 2021, he made his OTT debut with Aayiram Jannal Veedu, where he starred alongside veteran actor Senthil as his youngest grandson. He has shared screen with many veteran and legendary actors like Suriya, Senthil, Rajesh, M. S. Bhaskar and Vela Ramamoorthy. He had a major breakthrough in OTT through Kana Kaanum Kaalangal web series in 2022, where he played the role of Kalaiarasan, a juvenile convict who's struggling to live a peaceful life ahead of his past. He gained huge recognition for his performance and continued as the lead in both the seasons and made a cameo appearance in the third season, playing the female lead's guardian. Later in 2025, he made his television debut as an actor through the TV series Ayyanar Thunai as the male lead Chozhan. This is his fourth project with the production house Global Villagers, after giving two consecutive hit seasons of Kanaa Kaanum Kaalangal as lead and an extended cameo appearance in the third season. In 2026, Seiju participated in the seventh season of Cooku With Comali along with his wife and actress Sangeetha Sai as couple contestants and got eliminated as semi finalists.

== Television ==
List of shows and programs by Aravinth Seiju
Year	Name	Role	Channel	Notes
2018	Masala Cafe	Performer	Sun Life	Television debut as a performer
2020	Comedy Gangsters	Performer	Zee Tamil	Represented along with Blacksheep Team
2022	Anda Ka Kasam	Guest	Star Vijay	Promotion for Kanaa Kaanum Kaalangal
2022	Kana Kaanum Kaalangal	Kalaiarasan (a) Kalai	Star Vijay	Web series telecast on television
2025	Pandian Stores 2	Chozhan	Star Vijay	Cameo appearance
2025	Siragadikka Aasai	Chozhan	Star Vijay	Cameo appearance
2025	Ayyanar Thunai	Chozhan	Star Vijay	Television debut as an actor
2025	Oo Solriya Oo Oohm Solriya	Guest	Star Vijay	Came with his wife
2025	Super Singer Junior Season 10	Guest	Star Vijay	Promotion for Ayyanar Thunai
2025	Sound Party	Guest	Star Vijay	Came with Ayyanar Thunai team
2025	Athu Ithu Ethu	Guest	Star Vijay	Came with his wife
2025	Athu Ithu Ethu	Guest	Star Vijay	Came with Ayyanar Thunai team
2025	Dum Dum Dum Kalyana Galatta	Guest	Star Vijay	Came with his wife (Vijayadasami Special)
2025	Namma Veetu Deepavali	Guest	Star Vijay	Came with Ayyanar Thunai team (Deepavali Special)
2025	Start Music	Guest	Star Vijay	Came with his wife
2026	Anda Ka Kasam	Guest	Star Vijay	Came with Ayyanar Thunai team
2026	Happy Wife Happy Life	Guest	Star Vijay	Came with his wife
2026	Cooku with Comali season 7	Contestant	Star Vijay	Contesting along with his wife

== Filmography ==
Movies
Year	Name	Role	Notes
2018	Thuppakki Munai	Sachin's friend	Debut Film
2019	Nenjamundu Nermaiyundu Odu Raja	Subscriber	Cameo Appearance, Also assistant director during initial shoot
2021	Jai Bhim	Madhesh	
2024	Pilot Film	Unknown	Debut as a Lead, Shelved Project

Web Series
Year	Name	Role	Platform	Notes
2019	Aaha Kalyanam	Aravind (a) Ushaar	Blacksheep Youtube Channel, BS Value	Parallel Lead
2020	Aayiram Jannal Veedu	Gnanavel	Blacksheep Youtube Channel, BS Value	Parallel Lead
2021	Nenjam Marappadhillai	Aravind	Blacksheep Youtube Channel, BS Value	Supporting Role
2021	Naan Komali 1+1	Aravind Seiju (Farmer, Reporter, Doctor, Software Engineer, Advocate)	Blacksheep Youtube Channel, BS Value	Parallel Lead
2021	Seemathurai	Seemathurai	Blacksheep Youtube Channel, BS Value	Debut as a Lead(Blacksheep), Shelved project
2022	Kana Kaanum Kaalangal	Kalaiarasan (a) Kalai	JioHotstar	Debut as a Lead(Mainstream)
2023	Kana Kaanum Kaalangal Season 2	Kalaiarasan (a) Kalai	JioHotstar	
2024	Kana Kaanum Kaalangal Season 3	Kalaiarasan (a) Kalai	JioHotstar	Extended cameo appearance
2024	Happy Married Life	Aravind	Blacksheep Youtube Channel, BS Value	

Short Films and other works

Blacksheep Youtube Channel

He had either Aravind or Shiva as the character name for most of his short films.

- Gaandu Moments in Office (Also Directorial Debut)
- 3 Idiots
- Weekend Plan
- Mudhal Kanave
- Day Before House Shifting
- Mannipaaya
- Love Marriage
- Mr. Kanjan's Diwali
- Better Half
- Life of Single Child
- Kanpesum Varthaigal
- Seemathurai
- Kadavul Paadhi Mirugam Paadhi
- Mr. உத்தமன்
- Day Before School Re-Open
- Niram Maarum Kadhal
- Safety Check
- Namakku Matum Yean Ipdi Nadakudhu
- Priyamana Thozhi
- TV Potti (roast show)
- Thiruda Thiruda (game show)
- Digital Diwali

Music Videos
Year	Name	Singer(s)	Music	Notes
2017	Edhirae Aval Vanthathalae	Dhinesh Dhanush	Ganesh Aravindhan	Debut Song
2020	Family Song	Mahalingam	Manikandan Murali	From Aayiram Jannal Veedu album
2020	Adi Chellakutti / Celebration Song	Suganth, Shanthini Sathiyanathan	Manikandan Murali	From Aayiram Jannal Veedu album
2022	Ellame Jolly Dhaan	Adhithya RK	G. V. Prakash Kumar	Part of Kana Kaanum Kaalangal
2022	Kana Kaanum Kaalangal - Kanaa Vibe	Bharath K Rajesh, Bjorn Surrao	Leon James	Part of Kana Kaanum Kaalangal
2023	Blacksheep TV Digit"ALL" Anthem	Antony Thaasan, Aravind Karneeswaran	Guna Balasubramanian	
2026	Chandha Cheran Kalyanam	Sathyaprakash, Priyanka NK	Sathyaprakash	Part of Ayyanar Thunai

Other Works

- Happy Birthday (short film) - Kichdy Youtube Channel
- Aval En Aura(Shelved short film)

== Awards ==
Year	Title	Award	Category	Result	Notes
2022	Naan Komali 1+1	Blacksheep Kudumba Virudhugal 2022 (Blacksheep Champions)	People's Show of Blacksheep	Won	Team Award
2025	Ayyanar Thunai	Behindwoods Gold Icons	The most celebrated on screen pair (with Madhumitha Hirannaiah)	Won	
2025	Ayyanar Thunai	10th annual Vijay Television Awards	Find of the year - Male	Won	First individual award
2025	Ayyanar Thunai	10th annual Vijay Television Awards	Best hero	Nominated	
2025	Ayyanar Thunai	10th annual Vijay Television Awards	Favourite Pair (with Madhumitha Hirannaiah)	Nominated	
2025	Ayyanar Thunai	JFW Favourites of Tamil Nadu 2025	Favourite onscreen pair-Television (with Madhumitha Hirannaiah)	Won	
2026	Ayyanar Thunai	South Indian Television Serial Awards(SITSA)	Best Actor	Won	
