= No.1 Kodalu =

Indian Telugu language TV series

- Also known as: Number One Kodalu
- Genre: Drama
- Written by: Dialogues: Varaprasad K
- Story by: Narasimha Murthy Nallam
- Directed by: Rajinkanth Y
- Starring: Madhumitha Hirannaiah; Jai Dhanush; Sudha Chandran
- Theme music composer: Meenakshi Bhujang
- Country of origin: India
- Original language: Telugu
- No. of episodes: 735

Production
- Producers: Chikurupati Sunanda Harish; Chukurupati Harish
- Cinematography: Damodhar Rao
- Editor: MD Sharuk
- Camera setup: Multi-camera

Original release
- Network: Zee Telugu
- Release: 9 December 2019 – 9 July 2022

No.1 Kodalu was an Indian Telugu language family and drama television series aired on Zee Telugu from 9 December 2019 to 9 July 2022. It stars Sudha Chandran, Madhumitha Hirannaiah and Jai Dhanush in lead roles.

== Plot ==
The story revolves between two women, Vagdhevi and Saraswathi. Vagdhevi is a business entrepreneur, who is looking for an educated girl for her son Rahul. Saraswathi is an illiterate woman with a kind and good heart. Saraswati parents gave Vagdhevi their jewellery to start a school since she was staying at a village while educated. After Vagdhevi and her family have left the village Uma (Saraswati's mother) went to labour early because of the stress of being homeless after Arun Prasad's father kicked them out of his house. Jaghanadham (Saraswati's father) called Arun to come with his wife Vagdhevi to the hospital since he could not understand what the doctors are saying because he is illiterate but they didn't go because there was an inspection in Vagdhevi's school. Jaghanadham took wrong medicines to the hospital which eventually were the cause of Uma's death and left her child behind Chirni whose brain was underdeveloped. After the last rites of Uma, Jaghanadham left to Dubai to look for a job and left his two children with his brother in law. Saraswati took care of her sister like her own child while her Aunt abuses her because their father does not support them financially.

After some years

Rahul visit his grandfather after his mother Vagdhevi forbade him wanting his grandfather's land to start a business. Rahul befriends Saraswati. Seeing how Rahul and Saraswathi get along Rahul's grandfather encourages them to get married but Rahul refuses because he wants to marry educated women. Rahul eventually marries Saraswathi as it was the only way to make his dying grandfather to drink his medicines as he was having a heart attack. The land was shared between Rahul and Saraswati.

After a series of consequences, Rahul marries Saraswathi. He hides the truth from Vagdhevi and introduces her as maid named as Vani. Rahul educates her to get a good impression from Vagdhevi. Finally Vagdhevi accepts her as daughter-in-law.

== Cast ==
=== Main ===
- Madhumitha Hirannaiah as Saraswathi, also known as Sarasu/Brahmini/Vani; Rahul's wife; Vagdhevi and Arun Prasad's daughter-in-law
  - Baby Sahrudha as Young Sarasu
- Jai Dhanush as Rahul; Vagdhevi and Arun Prasad's son
- Sudha Chandran as Vagdhevi; Arun Prasad's wife; Rahul, Teja and Navya's mother

=== Recurring ===
- Anshu Reddy as Preethi
  - Meghana Khushi as Preethi
  - Usha Vaibhavi as Preethi
- Suresh as Arun Babu; Vagdevi's husband
- Kranthi as Teja; Vanaja's husband
- Sireesha as Uma; Sarasu's mother
- Sri Rithika as Vanaja; Teja's wife
  - Hrithi as Vanaja
- Jackie as Jagannadham;
  - Saakshi Siva as Jagannadham; Sarasu's father
- Siddu as Chakri
- Vasudha as Manasa
- Naveena as Nagamani
- Anusha Susarla as Maggie
- Akarsh Byramudi as Arjun
- Bhavana Reddy as Arjun's mother
- Rajitha as Katyayani
- Kalluru Kondareddy as Katyayani's son
- Neeraja Valisetty as Shyamala
- Sidhu as Chakri
- Numa Chandar as Navya
  - Paddu as Navya
- Abhilasha as Chakri's fake wife
- Manjula Paritala as Lawyer
- Madhu Reddy as Judge
- Bobby as Varun
- Vijaya as Savitri: Brahmini's mother
- Balaji as Narayana; Brahmini's father
- Chalapathi Chowdary as Eeshwar Prasad
- Saraswati Chalapathiraju as Ekambharam; Vaghevi's personal assistant
- Pravallika as Priya
- Durga Prasad as Abhi
- Rithika as Surekha
- Jaya Prakash as Unknown
- Abhishek Yannam as Rishi

=== Cameo appearances ===
- Rajeev Kanakala as Karan
- Mamilla Shailaja Priya as Shambhavi: Vagdevi's sister
- Baby Aahana Burfi as Vagdevi: Shambhavi, Karan's daughter
- Shivashankar
- Yeshashwi as Singer
- Chaitanya as Singer
- Gayathri as Singer

== Adaptations ==
Language	Title	Original release	Network(s)	Last aired	Notes
Telugu	No.1 Kodalu నం.1 కోడలు	9 December 2019	Zee Telugu	9 July 2022	Original
Tamil	Vidhya No.1 வித்யா நம்பர்.1	27 December 2021	Zee Tamil	25 February 2024	Remake

== Production ==
=== Filming ===
Due to the COVID-19 outbreak in India, No.1 Kodalu and all other television series and film shootings were suspended from March 19, 2020. Three months later, shooting was permitted and commenced from June, 2020. The series commenced telecasting new episodes from June 22, 2020.

=== Title song ===
All tracks are written by Sagar Narayana.

No.	Title	Lyrics	Music	Singer(s)	Length
1.	"No.1 Kodalu title song"	Sagar Narayana	Meenakshi Bhujang	Rahul Sipligunj	2:54
Total length:					2:54
