= Mahhi Vij =

Indian actress (born 1982)

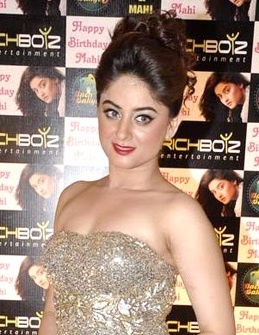
- Vij in 2013
- Born: 1 April 1982 (age 44); New Delhi, India
- Occupation: Actress
- Years active: 2002-present
- Spouse: Jay Bhanushali (m. 2011; div. 2026)
- Children: 3

Mahhi Vij (born 1 April 1982) is an Indian model and actress who appears on Hindi television. She is known for her roles in Laagi Tujhse Lagan, Balika Vadhu and Seher – Hone Ko Hai. Vij and her ex-husband Jay Bhanushali won the dance reality show Nach Baliye 5 in 2013. She also participated in Jhalak Dikhhla Jaa 4 and Khatron Ke Khiladi 7.

== Career ==
Vij moved to Mumbai at the age of 17 and started her career in modelling. She has appeared in numerous music videos including Tu, Tu Hai Wahi (DJ Aqeel Mix). She was the supporting female lead in the TV series Akela in 2006.

Her first film was in Malayalam alongside Malayalam star Mammootty which was titled Aparichithan.

She played the lead role of Pratha in the Sahara One show Shubh Kadam. Her breakthrough role was that of protagonist Nakusha in the television show Laagi Tujhse Lagan on Colors TV, for which she won the Gold Award for Best Actress in a Lead Role in 2011. She was seen in season 4 of Jhalak Dikhhla Jaa as a contestant.

In 2012, she and her husband Jay Bhanushali participated in the dance reality show Nach Baliye 5 and became the winners. In 2016, she played Nandini Shekhawat in Colors TV's Balika Vadhu after the generation leap until the show went off-aired in same year.

After a 9 years long hiatus, Vij returned to acting as Kausar Baig in Colors TV's Seher – Hone Ko Hai in December 2025. In May 2026, she quit the series.

Mahi Vij joined Bigg Boss 20, which premiered on 6 September 2026.

== Personal life ==
Vij married Indian television and film actor Jay Bhanushali in 2011. In 2017, they fostered a boy named Rajveer and a girl named Khushi. The couple's first biological child, a daughter, Tara was born in 2019. Vij and Bhanushali got divorced in 2026, after 15 years of marriage.

== Filmography ==
=== Films ===
Year	Title	Role	Language
2004	Tapana	Meera	Telugu
2004	Aparichithan	Kalyani	Malayalam
2008	Ganga Kaveri	Ganga	Kannada

=== Television ===
Year	Title	Role	Notes	Ref.
2006	Akela	Meghna		
2008	Ssshhhh...Koi Hai	Manisha Desai		
2008	Kaisi Laagi Lagan	Pratha		
2008–2009	Shubh Kadam	Pratha		
2009–2012	Laagi Tujhse Lagan	Nakusha Patil		
2009	Bairi Piya	Nakusha Patil	Guest	
2009	Na Aana Is Des Laado	Nakusha Patil	Guest	
2010	Rishton Se Badi Pratha	Nakusha Patil	Guest	
2010	Nachle Ve with Saroj Khan	Contestant		
2010–2011	Jhalak Dikhhla Jaa 4	Contestant	4th place	
2011	Comedy Circus Ka Naya Daur	Contestant		
2011	Sasural Simar Ka	Nakusha Patil	Guest	
2012	V The Serial	Herself	Guest	
2012	Teri Meri Love Stories	Saloni		
2012	Savdhaan India	Reha		
2012	Savdhaan India	Dr. Anju		
2012	Jhalak Dikhhla Jaa 5	Herself	Guest	
2012	Movers & Shakers	Contestant		
2012–2013	Nach Baliye 5	Contestant	Winner	
2013	Do Dil Bandhe Ek Dori Se	Herself	Guest	
2014	Comedy Nights with Kapil	Herself	Guest	
2014	Encounter	Aashna		
2015	Bigg Boss 9	Herself	Guest	
2016	Fear Factor: Khatron Ke Khiladi 7	Contestant	10th place	
2016	Balika Vadhu	Nandini Shivraj Shekhar/Nandini Shekhawat/Nandini Krish Malhotra		
2018	Laal Ishq	Seher		
2019	Kitchen Champion 5	Herself	Guest	
2019	Bigg Boss 13	Herself	Guest	
2020	Mujhse Shaadi Karoge	Herself	Guest	
2025–2026	Seher – Hone Ko Hai	Kausar Baig		
2026	Bigg Boss 20	Contestant		

=== Music video ===
S.no	Title	singers	Album	Notes
	Tu Hai Wahi	DJ Aqeel, Vaishali Samant	Ek Haseena Thi	Released in 2002
	Roz Roz aap ki aankhon		Haseen lamahe	
	Nit Khair Manga	Hans Raj Hans	Visakhi	
