= Jai Hanuman (2018 TV series) =

Indian Kannada-language soap opera

- Genre: Soap opera; Devotion
- Created by: Goutham; Suma
- Screenplay by: Neeraj
- Story by: Dialogues: B L Suresh
- Directed by: Bukkapatna Vasu
- Creative director: Himani Rathore
- Starring: Master Pradyumna; Priyanka Chincholi; Prasanna
- Opening theme: Jai hanuman
- Country of origin: India
- Original language: Kannada
- No. of seasons: 1
- No. of episodes: 100

Production
- Executive producer: Rahul Parashar
- Producers: Abhimanyu Singh; Roopali Singh
- Camera setup: Multi-camera
- Running time: 20–21 minutes
- Production companies: Sun Entertainment; Contiloe Pictures Pvt Ltd

Original release
- Network: Udaya TV
- Release: 8 October 2018 – 20 February 2019

Related
- Maya; Sevanthi

Jai Hanuman was a 2018-2019 Indian Kannada-language soap opera which premiered on Udaya TV on 8 October 2018 and ended on 20 February 2019. Produced by Contiloe Pictures Pvt Ltd it starred Master Pradyumna in the lead role Priyanka Chincholi, and Prasanna in pivotal roles. It is the remake of the Hindi serial Sankat Mochan Mahabali Hanumaan. The show was retelecasted on Udaya TV in 2021.

== Plot ==
The show portrays the story of Lord Hanuman and how he was an incarnation of Lord Shiva who took birth to aid Lord Rama in killing King Ravana.

== Cast ==
- Master Pradyumna as Hanuman
- Priyanka Chincholi as Anjana
- Prasanna as Kesari
- Vinaya Gowda as Ravana
- Madhumitha Hirannaiah as Lakshmi
- Nagashree as Parvati

== Dubbed versions ==
Language	Title	Original release	Network(s)	Last aired
Bengali	Jai Hanuman	27 April 2019	Sun Bangla	4 August 2019
Telugu	Jai Hanuman	31 August 2020	Gemini TV	23 October 2020
Malayalam	Jai Hanuman	19 April 2021	Surya TV	9 July 2021
Marathi	Jai Hanuman	14 March 2022	Sun Marathi	11 June 2022
Hindi	Kesari Nandhan Hanuman	15 April 2024	Sun Neo	11 June 2024
