= Jaan Pechaan =

Jaan Pehchan
- Directed by: Kamal Saigal
- Produced by: Ravie Sonie
- Starring: Utpal Dutt; Radha Asrani; Birbal; Sudha Chandran; Meera Madhuri; Arun Mathur; Shekhar Suman; Satish Shah
- Music by: Iqbal Gill
- Release date: 20 July 1991
- Country: India
- Language: Hindi

Jaan Pechaan is a 1991 family-drama Indian Hindi film directed by Kamal Saigal and produced by Ravie Sonie. It starred Utpal Dutt, Radha Asrani, Birbal, Sudha Chandran, Meera Madhuri, Arun Mathur, Shekhar Suman and Satish Shah in lead roles. Music for the film was scored by Iqbal Gill.

== Songs ==
1. "Ankhiyan Milake Mujhe Pyar Sikhake" - Anuradha Paudwal
2. "Baharon Mein Nazaron Mein" - Shabbir Kumar, Kavita Krishnamurthy
3. "Jo Bhi Kahoongi Main Sach Kahoongi" - Anuradha Paudwal
4. "Mohabbat Na Karna Zamana Bura Hai" - Iqbal Gill
5. "Mujhko Mohabbat Hai Tumse" - Kavita Krishnamurthy
