= Shubh Kadam =

- Genre: Horror
- Written by: Saagar Gupta dialogues
- Story by: Anshuman Sinha
- Directed by: Rishi Tyagi; Ajeet Kumar
- Creative director: Amita Devadiga
- Starring: See below
- Theme music composer: Sandeep & Surya
- Opening theme: "Shubh Kadam" by Akriti Kakkar
- Country of origin: India
- Original language: Hindi
- No. of seasons: 1
- No. of episodes: 153

Production
- Executive producer: Punit Singh
- Producers: Prem Malhotra; Sunil Mehta
- Cinematography: Sushil Sharma
- Editors: Sanjeev Shukla; Basant Nath
- Camera setup: Multi-camera
- Running time: Approx. 24 minutes
- Production company: Cinevistaas Limited

Original release
- Network: Sahara One
- Release: 11 February – 11 September 2009

Shubh Kadam (transl. Lucky feet) is an Indian television series that aired on Sahara One

== Plot ==
The story revolves around Pratha, who is haunted by an evil spirit after her marriage to Raghav, wreaking havoc on her family.

== Cast ==
- Mahhi Vij as Pratha
- Prateek Shukla as Raghav
- Prabha Sinha as Raghav's Mother
- Priyamvada Sawant as Chitra (Raghav's widowed sister-in-law)
- Dev Keswani as Swayam (Tenant at Raghav's house who plays love interest to Chitra)
- Sudha Chandran as Raghav's Biological Mother
- Suresh Marathe as Diwakar Deshmukh
- Anubha Bhonsale as Pratha's Stepsister
- Nazneen Patel
- Rupal Patel
- Abhay Shukla
