= Sudha Chandran =

Indian dancer and actress

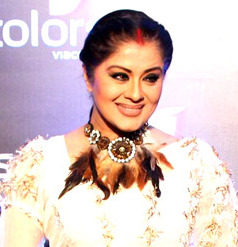
- Born: 21 September 1965 (age 61); Bombay, Maharashtra, India
- Occupations: Actress; Dancer
- Years active: 1984–present
- Spouse: Ravi Dang (m. 1994)

Sudha Chandran (born 21 September 1965) is an Indian actress and Bharatanatyam dancer known for her works in Hindi, Tamil, Telugu, Malayalam, Kannada, Gujarati and Marathi language films and television series, shows. Sudha Chandran is best known for her roles as Mayuri in Mayuri (1985) for which she won the National Film Award – Special Jury Award, as Ramola Sikand in Kaahin Kissii Roz (2001 series), as Yamini Singh, as Chandramathi in Kalasam (2008 series), as Bhuvana in Thendral (2009 series), as a Judge in reality shows such as Solvathelam Unmai, Dance Jodi Dance, as Chitra Devi Chakravarthy in Deivam Thandha Veedu (2013 series), and as Yamini (Seema/Patali) in Naagin 1, 2, 3 and 6 (2015 series).

== Early and personal life ==
Sudha Chandran was born on 21 September 1965 in Mumbai. She had stated in an interview of Nettavu, that she was born and raised in Mumbai, but her family originates from Vayalur, Tiruchirappalli, Tamil Nadu. Her father K.D. Chandran, worked at USIS and was a former actor. Sudha Chandran earned her B.A. from Mithibai College, Mumbai and subsequently an M.A. in economics.

In May 1981, at about 16 years old, in Tamil Nadu, Sudha met with an accident in which her legs were injured. She received initial medical treatment of her injuries at a local hospital and was later admitted to Vijaya Hospital at Madras. After doctors discovered that gangrene had set in, amputation of her right leg was required. Sudha says that this period was the toughest of her life. She subsequently regained some mobility with the help of a prosthetic Jaipur foot. She returned to dancing after a gap of two years and performed in India, Saudi Arabia, United States, UK, Canada, UAE, Qatar, Kuwait, Bahrain, Yemen and Oman. Sudha Chandran married assistant director Ravi Dang in 1994. She was given an honorary doctorate by Invertis University, Bareilly.

== Career ==
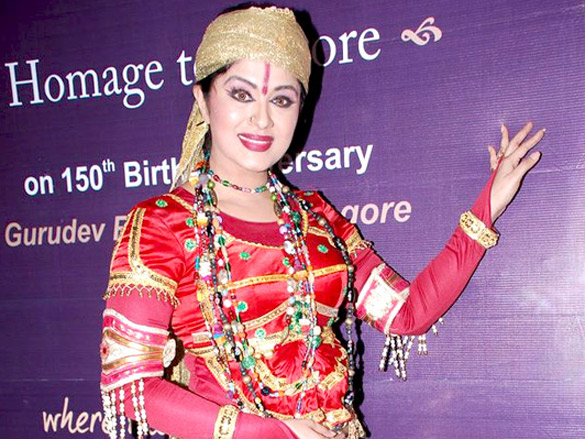
Chandran at Rabindranath Tagore's 150th birth anniversary celebration

Sudha Chandran started her career with a Telugu film Mayuri, which was based on her own life.

== Filmography ==
=== Films ===
Year	Film	Role	Language	Ref(s)
1984	Mayuri	Mayuri Olpam	Telugu	
1986	Naache Mayuri	Mayuri	Hindi	
1986	Malarum Kiliyum	Rekha	Malayalam	
1986	Sarvam Sakthimayam	Sivakami	Tamil	
1986	Dharmam	Valli	Tamil	
1986	Nambinar Keduvathillai	Jyothi	Tamil	
1986	Vasantha Raagam	Vasantha	Tamil	
1987	Kalam Mari Katha Mari	Arifa	Tamil	
1987	Chinna Thambi Periya Thambi	Thayamma	Tamil	
1987	Chinna Poove Mella Pesu	Shanthi	Tamil	
1987	Thaye Neeye Thunai	Sivagami	Tamil	
1987	Thanga Kalasam	Chandra	Tamil	
1987	Bedi	Sandhya Rani	Kannada	
1988	Oorigitta Kolli	Girija	Kannada	
1988	Olavina Aasare	Chandrika	Kannada	
1988	Bisilu Beladingalu		Kannada	
1990	Muraligaana Amrutapaana	Dancer	Kannada	
1990	Rajnartaki	Chandrima	Hindi	
1990	Thanedaar	Mrs. Jagdish Chandra	Hindi	
1990	Pati Parmeshwar		Hindi	
1991	Maskari	Suman	Hindi	
1991	Kurbaan	Prithvi's sister	Hindi	
1991	Jaan Pechaan	Hema	Hindi	
1991	Jeene Ki Sazaa	Sheetal	Hindi	
1992	Nishchaiy	Julie	Hindi	
1992	Inteha Pyar Ki	Dancer at Tania's wedding	Hindi	
1992	Qaid Mein Hai Bulbul	Julie	Hindi	
1992	Shola Aur Shabnam	Karan's Sister	Hindi	
1992	Insaaf Ki Devi	Sita S. Prakash	Hindi	
1992	Tahalka	Seema in a special appearance	Hindi	
1993	Phoolan Hasina Ramkali	Phoolan	Hindi	
1993	Avan Ananthapadmanabhan	Bhadra	Malayalam	
1994	Fauj	Jamuna	Hindi	
1994	Anjaam	Shivani's sister	Hindi	
1994	Baali Umar Ko Salaam	Jaalan's niece	Hindi	
1995	Milan	Jaya	Hindi	
1995	Raghuveer	Aarti Verma	Hindi	
1997	Kadlani Jod		Gujarati	
1998	Phir Wohi Awaaz	Rekha	Hindi	
1999	Sethi Nu Sindoor		Gujarati	
1999	Hum Aapke Dil Mein Rehte Hain	Manju	Hindi	
1999	Maa Baap Ne Bhulso Nahi	Sharda	Gujarati	
2000	Chundni Ni Laaj		Gujarati	
2000	Maa Tara Haiya Na Het		Gujarati	
2000	Tune Mera Dil Le Liyaa	Rani (Veeru's girlfriend)	Hindi	
2001	Ek Lootere		Hindi	
2004	Smile Please	Tulsi	Hindi	
2006	Shaadi Karke Phas Gaya Yaar	Doctor	Hindi	
2006	Malamaal Weekly	Thakurain	Hindi	
2007	Waado Ki Agni Pariksha Naaginn	Goorak Naths'Guru maa	Hindi	
2008	Pranali	Aka	Hindi	
2008	Yaar Meri Zindagi	Shikha	Hindi	
2008	Saanncha		Hindi	
2008	Sathyam	Sathyam's mother	Tamil	Bilingual film
2008	Salute	Sathyam's mother	Telugu	Bilingual film
2009	Anubhav	Kalpana	Hindi	
2010	Alexander the Great	Gayathri Devi	Malayalam	
2011	Venghai	Radhika's Mother	Tamil	
2011	Yeh Faasley	Judge	Hindi	
2012	B & W the Black and White Fact		Hindi	
2013	Paramveer Parshuram		Hindi	
2013	Cleopatra		Malayalam	
2013	Ameerin Aadhi Bhagavan	Indra Sundaramurthy	Tamil	
2016	Guru Sukran		Tamil	
2016	Sisters	Sudha	Hindi	
2016	Babuji Ek Ticket Bambai		Hindi	
2017	Tera Intezaar	Black Magician	Hindi	
2017	Ramratan	Mrs. Mahendra Rathod	Hindi	
2017	Vizhithiru	Vijayalakshmi	Tamil	
2018	Saamy 2	Ilaiya Perumal (Perumal Pichai)'s wife	Tamil	
2018	Krina		Hindi	
2019	Used	Kalyani Sharma	Hindi	
2019	Love Shots		Hindi	
2019	Sifar	Ayesha	Hindi	
2021	Match of Life	Viraj's mother	Hindi	
2021	Raag		Hindi	
2022	Visithiran	Advocate Srinidhi	Tamil	

=== Television ===
Year	Show	Role	Language	Ref(s)
1993	Rishtey	Sonu	Hindi	
1993	Aprijitha		Hindi	
1996	Saahil		Hindi	
1998	Chashme Badoor		Hindi	
1998–2003	Heena		Hindi	
2000–2001	Shaka Laka Boom Boom		Hindi	
2000–2003	Mahisasuramardini	Devi Durga (Extended Cameo Appearance)	Hindi	
2001	Kaise Kahoon		Hindi	
2001–2004	Kaahin Kissii Roz	Ramola Sikand	Hindi	
2002–2005	Kyunki Saas Bhi Kabhi Bahu Thi	Justice Renuka Chaudhary / ACP Ragini Suryavanshi	Hindi	
2003–2004	Tum Bin Jaaoon Kahaan	Guruma	Hindi	
2003–2004	Vishnu Puran	Kunti	Hindi	
2004	Zameen Se Aassman Tak	Meera	Hindi	
2004–2006	Tumhari Disha	Vasundhara Malik	Hindi	
2004–2006	K. Street Pali Hill	Gayathri Kaul	Hindi	
2006–2009	Kashmakash Zindagi Ki	Rajyalakshmi	Hindi	
2006–2008	Solhah Singaarr	Rajeshwari	Hindi	
2007–2008	Ardhangini	Maushmi Bhatacharjee	Hindi	
2007–2008	Kuchh Is Tara	Mallika Nanda	Hindi	
2007–2008	Kis Desh Mein Hai Meraa Dil	Inspector Sagarika Solanki	Hindi	
2007–2009	Kasturi	Maasi	Hindi	
2008–2011	Mata Ki Chowki - Kalyug Mein Bhakti Ki Shakti	Shwetha Devi	Hindi	
2008–2009	Kaisi Laagi Lagan	Ambika	Hindi	
2008–2009	Shubh Kadam		Hindi	
2008–2009	Jayam	Padmavathi	Tamil	
2008–2009	Jayam Thodargirathu	Padmavathi	Tamil	
2008–2009	Kalasam	Chandramathi	Tamil	
2009	Arasi	Madurai Thilagavathi	Tamil	
2009–2010	Karunamanjari	Indira	Tamil	
2009–2010	Pondatti Thevai	Raji	Tamil	
2009–	Dhayam		Tamil	
2010–2011	Soundaravalli	Akilandeshwari	Tamil	
2010–2011	Do Saheliyaan	Guru Maa	Hindi	
2010–2011	Mrs. & Mr. Sharma Allahabadwale	Neighbour	Hindi	
2010–2011	Sanjog Se Bani Sangini	Kalki Devi	Hindi	
2010–2011	Mata Ki Chowki	Swetha Devi	Hindi	
2010–2011	Adaalat	Indrani Singh	Hindi	
2011–2012	Shama		Hindi	
2011–2012	No.23 Mahalakshmi Nivasam	Radha	Telugu	
2012–2013	Thendral	Bhuvaneswari (Bhuvana)	Tamil	
2013–2015	Deivam Thandha Veedu	Chitradevi Devraj Chakravarthy	Tamil	
2012	Aardram	Retired judge Sharada Pillai	Malayalam	
2012	Jhilmil Sitaaron Ka Aangan Hoga	Kalyani Devi Raichand	Hindi	
2012	Suryaputhri		Hindi	
2012	Dil Se Di Dua... Saubhagyavati Bhava?	Mrs.Vyas	Hindi	
2013	Ek Thhi Naayka	Uma Viswas	Hindi	
2014	Kaisa Yeh Ishq Hai... Ajab Sa Risk Hai	Lohari	Hindi	
2014–2015	Shastri Sisters	Buaji	Hindi	
2015–2016	Naagin	Yamini Singh Raheja	Hindi	
2015	Comedy Nights Bachao	Yamini Singh Raheja	Hindi	
2016–2017	Naagin 2	Yamini Singh Raheja	Hindi	
2017	Ayushman Bhava	Mai	Hindi	
2017	Karmaphal Daata Shani	Simhika	Hindi	
2017	Door Kinare Milte Hai		Hindi	
2017	Pardes Mein Hai Mera Dil	Harjeet Khurana	Hindi	
2017	Bakula Bua Ka Bhoot	Sanjana (Extended Cameo Appearance)	Hindi	
2018	Ishq Mein Marjawan	Sujata (Extended Cameo Appearance)	Hindi	
2018	Saptapadi		Hindi	
2018	Yeh Hai Mohabbatein	Sudha Shrivaastav	Hindi	
2019	Lakshmi Stores	Sakunthala Devi	Tamil	
2019	Lakshmi Stores	Sakunthala Devi	Telugu	
2019	Naagin 3	Yamini Singh Raheja (Cameo Appearance)	Hindi	
2019–2020	Bepannah Pyaar	Kunti Malhotra	Hindi	
2019–2020	Tara From Satara	Srilekha (Extended Cameo Appearance)	Hindi	
2019–2022	No.1 Kodalu	Vagdevi Arunprasad Vikramaneni	Telugu	
2022–2025	Maari	Chamundeshwari (Extended Cameo Appearance)	Tamil	
2022	Marumakal	Vasundhara Devi	Malayalam	
2022–2023	Naagin 6	Seema Gujral / Tara / Patali	Hindi	
2023	Bekaboo	Pataali	Hindi	
2023–2025	Doree	Rukmani Mahendra Thakur and Kailashi Mahendra Thakur	Hindi	
2024	Suhaagan: Ke Rang Jashn Ke Rang	Kailashi Devi Thakur (Cameo Appearance)	Hindi	
2024–2025	Safal Hogi Teri Aradhana	Menka Bharadhwaj	Hindi	
2024	Kannedhirey Thondrinaal	Sarada Devi (Cameo Appearance)	Tamil	
2025–2026	Noyontara	Ghorkamini	Hindi	
2026	Karthigai Deepam	Ranganayagi (Cameo Appearance)	Tamil	
2026	Meghasandesam	Herself (Cameo Appearance)	Telugu	
2026 - present	Mookuthi Amman		Tamil	

=== Others ===
Year	Programme	Role	Language	Ref(s)
2007	Jhalak Dikhhla Jaa 2	Contestant	Hindi	
2007	Krazy Kiya Re	Judge	Hindi	
2007	Super Dancer Juniors Season 1	Judge	Malayalam	
2008	Super Dancer Seniors Season 1	Judge	Malayalam	
2009	Super Dancer Juniors Season 2	Judge	Malayalam	
2013	Uggram Ujjwalam	Judge	Malayalam	
2013	Little Stars	Judge	Malayalam	
2013	Marathi Taraaka	Judge	Marathi	
2014–2017	Solvathellam Unmai	Judge	Tamil	
2014–2017	Dance Jodi Dance	Judge	Tamil	
2014–2017	Dancing Khilladies	Judge	Tamil	
2017–2018	Zee Dance League	Judge	Tamil	
2017–2018	Dance Jodi Dance Juniors	Judge	Tamil	
2017–2018	Malayali Veettamma	Judge	Malayalam	
2018 / 2019	Comedy Stars season 2	Judge	Malayalam	
2019	Thakarppan Comedy	Judge	Malayalam	
2019	Kitchen Champion	Contestant	Hindi	
2019	Naagin Blockbuster	Herself	Hindi	
2020	Bigg Boss 14	Herself	Hindi	
2021–2022	Crime Alert	Host	Hindi	
2022	MY G Flowers Oru Kodi	Participant	Malayalam	
2023	Entertainment Ki Raat Housefull	Nani	Hindi	
2023	Bigg Boss 17	Herself	Hindi	

Other works

Year	Show	Role	Language	Ref(s)
2018	Rudra Ke Rakshak	Voice for queen Spider	Hindi	
2021	Kaneez (web series)	Begum	Hindi	
2021–2022	Crime Alert	Producer	Hindi	

== Awards ==
- 1985: National Film Award – Special Jury Award for Mayuri
- 1985: Nandi Special Jury Award for Mayuri
- 2004: Star Parivaar Awards: Favourite Saas for Kaahin Kissii Roz as Ramola Sikand
- 2005: ITA Award for Best Actress in a Negative Role for Prratima as Alkalata Roy
- 2017: Colors Golden Petal Award for Best Actor in a Comic Role for Naagin
- 2020: Zeetelugu kutumbam awards for Uttama Inti pedda main lead role in No.1Kodalu

Doctor of Arts in 19 May 2016 at Invertis University, Bareilly U P
