= Ayyanar Thunai =

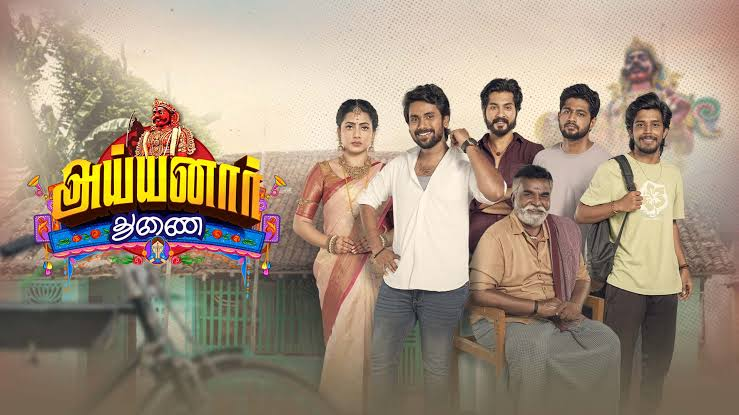
- Genre: Drama
- Written by: Priya Thambi
- Screenplay by: Priya Thambi
- Directed by: Ramkumar Das
- Starring: Madhumitha Hirannaiah; Aravinth Seiju; Munaf Rahman; VJ Arun Karthi; Parvez Musharaf; S. T. P. Rosary
- Theme music composer: P. G. Ragesh
- Country of origin: India
- Original language: Tamil
- No. of episodes: 518

Production
- Producers: R. Venkatesh Babu; Vaishnavi. V
- Production location: Tamil Nadu
- Cinematography: R. S. Saravanan
- Editors: Prem Kumar; Kiran
- Camera setup: Multi-Camera
- Running time: approx. 22–24 minutes per episode
- Production company: Global Villagers

Original release
- Network: Star Vijay
- Release: 27 January 2025 – present

Ayyanar Thunai (transl. Support of Ayyanar) is a 2025 Indian Tamil language drama television series starring Madhumitha Hirannaiah in the lead role, along with Aravind Seiju, Munaf Rahman, VJ Arun Karthi, Parvez Musharaf and S. T. P. Rosary in prominent roles. It is produced by R. Venkatesh Babu and Vaishnavi V. under the banner of Global Villagers. It premiered on Star Vijay on 27 January 2025 and is also available on the digital platform JioHotstar.

The series follows the story of Nila, a university rank holder and gold medalist in architecture who aspires to pursue higher education abroad. However, her wealthy businessman father arranges her marriage to a man who expects her to be a traditional housewife. Unhappy with this arrangement, Nila's path crosses with Chozhan, a driver hailing from a modest background. Chozhan lives with his three brothers-Cheran, Pandian, Pallavan and their father, Natesan, a truck driver who becomes an alcoholic after his wife's death. The family faces societal challenges due to the absence of a homemaker in their household as well as legal issues with their home. The narrative unfolds with Nila's entry into their lives bringing about significant changes.

== Summary ==
The story starts with Nila, a Gold Medalist in Architecture. Despite her dreams of soaring high, her father Manohar treats her like a bird in a cage, trying to force her into a marriage with Surya, a man who hates the idea of a working wife. To escape this suffocating life, Nila’s path crosses with Chozhan, a simple, carefree attitude driver. Through a series of desperate twists, they enter into a "fake" marriage of necessity.

Nila, who grew up in luxury, suddenly finds herself as the only daughter-in-law in the Ayyanar household—a rough-and-tumble home with four brothers and their father, Natesan, who haven't had a woman’s touch in the house for years.

Nila’s own family, Ayyanar family's neighbors, relatives especially their uncle and aunt, look down on this union, and mocking her. But Nila doesn't back down. As a daughter-in-law, she slowly transforms the chaotic house into a home, and as a sister-in-law, she becomes the backbone for the four brothers—Cheran, Chozhan, Pandiyan, and Pallavan.

The family’s struggle lies in Natesan’s past. After his wife died, he was framed and sent to jail for a crime he didn't commit—betrayed by his own brother and sister. This betrayal left the brothers to grow up in poverty and stigma. Natesan emerged from prison a broken man, turning to alcohol, but Nila’s entry into the family acts as a healing balm, slowly restoring his dignity and proving to the world that he is a man of immense honesty.

Cheran, the eldest, was deeply in love with their cousin Karthika, but family politics and force led her to marry another man, leaving Cheran heartbroken.

Meanwhile, the youngest, Pandiyan, fell for a college girl named Vanathi, but her family stands as a massive wall against them, constantly creating hurdles.

Few months later, It is revealed that Pallavan isn't Natesan’s biological son. Years ago, while Natesan was driving trucks in the North, his friend died, leaving behind a wife, Komal, and a baby. Komal gave her son to Natesan to raise so she could remarry. Now, she returned to the Ayyanar family with hidden, evil motives. It was Nila’s sharp instincts that exposed Komal’s true nature, saving the family once again. During this chaos, Pallavan’s college romance fell apart, and Gayatri—who originally had a one-sided crush on Chozhan—eventually found a place in Pallavan's life.

Cheran has found love again with Chandha, a North Indian girl and the sister of his coworker Aneesh. However, their marriage keeps getting delayed due to endless family complications.

On Nila's professional front, things turned dark when her boss Raghav (the MD) began obsessively torturing her under the guise of love. Unable to take the harassment, Nila quit and started her own firm along with her colleague Divya. Seeing Nila struggle for capital to start the business, Chozhan did the unthinkable—he stole a large sum of money from his own company to support Nila’s dreams.

Now, Nila is fighting to establish her career while Chozhan carries the weight of his secret sacrifice, and the Ayyanar family stands at a crossroads where their past secrets and current risks are colliding.

== Cast ==
=== Main ===
- Madhumitha Hirannaiah as Nila Chozhan: Architect; Manohar and Thenmozhi's daughter; Dass's sister; Chozhan's wife; Natesan's daughter-in-law
- Aravinth Seiju as Chozhan Natesan: Cab driver; Natesan and Shanthi's second son; Cheran and Pandiyan's brother; Pallavan's adopted brother; Nila's husband; Manohar's son-in-law
- Munna Rahman as Cheran Natesan: Head worker in a construction site; Natesan and Shanthi's eldest son; Chozhan and Pandiyan's brother; Pallavan's adopted brother; Karthika's ex-lover; Chandayatha's husband
- Swathi Nair as Chandayatha Cheran aka Chanda: Aneesh's sister; Cheran's wife
- VJ Arun Karthi as Pandiyan Natesan: Mechanic shop owner; Natesan and Shanthi's youngest son; Cheran and Chozhan's brother; Pallavan's adopted brother; Vanathi's love interest
- Parvez Musharaf as Pallavan Natesan: TNPSC aspirant; Komal's son; Natesan and Shanthi's adopted son; Cheran, Chozhan, and Pandiyan's adopted brother; Gayathri's love interest
- S. T. P. Rosary as Natesan: Mini truck driver; Chidambaram's younger and Kasturi's elder brother; Shanthi's widower; Cheran, Chozhan, and Pandiyan's father; Pallavan's adoptive father

=== Recurring ===
- Sushmitha as Swathi: pallavan classmate & love interest in the academy who is preparing for government exams
- Atchaya Roy as Vanathi Manickam: a pharmacist student; Manickam's daughter; Vasanth's sister; Pandiyan's love interest
- Ayesha as Gayathri: College student; Pallavan's love interest; Chozhan's former one-sided lover
- Reshma Prasad as Karthika Ashwin: Kasturi's daughter; Cheran, Chozhan and Pandiyan's cousin; Pallavan's adopted cousin; Cheran's ex-lover; Ashwin's wife
- Ashwin Kannan as Ashwin: Karthika's husband
- Supergood Kannan as Manohar: Thenmozhi's husband; Dass and Nila's father
- Gayathri Priya as Thenmozhi Manohar: Manohar's wife; Dass and Nila's mother
- Jebin John as Dass Manohar: Manohar and Thenmozhi's son; Nila's brother; Madhi's husband
- Deepthi Kapil as Madhi Dass: Dass's wife
- Malik as Aneesh: Chanda's brother; Cheran's co-worker and friend
- Agalaya Agal as Kasturi: Chidhambaram and Natesan's sister; Karthika’s mother
- Bharath Mohan as Kasturi's husband; Karthika's father
- Vincent Roy as Chidhambaram; Natesan and Kasturi's brother
- Divya Vijay Kumar as Divya: Pallavan's college mate and ex-love interest
- Sasindhar Pushpalingam as Surya: Nila's ex-fiancé
- Paranthaman as Kannan: Pandiyan's friend and co-worker
- KB Bala Balasubramanian as Manickam: Auto driver; Vanathi and Vasanth's father
- Chandru as Vasanth Manickam: Manickam's son; Vanathi's brother
- Jasmine Parveen as Divya: Nila's colleague and friend
- Baala as Murugan: Nila's senior colleague
- Mohammed Salmaan / Vikash Sampath as Raghav: managing director running a architecture firm where nila works and had feelings for nila but nila doesn't love him back.
- Baanu as Komal: Pallavan's mother
- Guna as Komal's second husband
- Mullai Dhanasekaran as Constable Vaazhavandhan: Chozhan's well-wisher; Sumathi's husband
- Pushpa as Sumathi Vaazhavandhan: Vaazhavandhan's wife

=== Special appearance ===
- Roopa Sree as Shanthi: Natesan's wife; Cheran, Chozhan and Pandiyan's mother; Pallavan's adoptive mother (Photographic Appearance)
- Azhagae Azhagu family members in Cheran and Chanda's wedding
- Vasanth Vasi as Murugan
- Vaishnavi Sundar as Indhira
- Naleef Gea as Arjun
- Shobanaa Uthaman as Madhu

== Reception ==
The show got a TVR of 4.84 on its Launch week on January - February 2025.

=== Extended telecast ===
- From 11 August 2025 following the conclusion of the long-running series Baakiyalakshmi, both Pandian Stores 2 and Ayyanar Thunai were broadcast as 45 minutes special episodes. This extended telecast continued until 5 October 2025.

== Awards ==
Year	Title	Category	Recipient	Result	Ref.
2025	Behindwoods Gold Icon Awards	Most celebrated on screen pair	Madhumitha & Aravinth Seiju	Won	
2025	10th Annual Vijay Television Awards		Madhumitha & Aravinth Seiju		
2025	10th Annual Vijay Television Awards	Favorite Pair	Madhumitha & Aravinth Seiju	Nominated	
2025	10th Annual Vijay Television Awards	Find of the year – Female	Madhumitha	Won	
2025	10th Annual Vijay Television Awards	Best Heroine	Madhumitha	Nominated	
2025	10th Annual Vijay Television Awards	Find of the year – Male	Aravinth Seiju	Won	
2025	10th Annual Vijay Television Awards	Best Hero	Aravinth Seiju	Nominated	
2025	10th Annual Vijay Television Awards	Best Character – Male	Munaf Rahman	Won	
2025	10th Annual Vijay Television Awards	Best Father	S. T. P. Rosary	Nominated	
2025	10th Annual Vijay Television Awards	Favorite Serial	Ayyanar Thunai	Nominated	
2025	10th Annual Vijay Television Awards	Best DOP	R. S. Saravanan	Won	
2025	10th Annual Vijay Television Awards	Best Writer	Priya Thampy	Won	
2025	JFW Favourites of Tamil Nadu 2025	Favourite onscreen pair-Television	Aravinth Seiju and Madhumitha	Won	
2026	Galatta Glorious Icons Awards 2026(Second Edition)	Best Television Show of the year - Fiction	Ayyanar Thunai	Won	
2026	Indian Awards 2026	Favorite family of the year 2026	Ayyanar Thunai	Won	
2026	South Indian Television Serial Awards(SITSA)	Best Serial	Ayyanar Thunai	Won	
2026	South Indian Television Serial Awards(SITSA)	Best Actor	Aravinth Seiju	Won	
2026	South Indian Television Serial Awards(SITSA)	Best Actress	Madhumitha	Won	
2026	South Indian Television Serial Awards(SITSA)	Best Director	Ramkumar Dass	Nominated	
2026	South Indian Television Serial Awards(SITSA)	Best Supporting Actor	VJ Arun Karthi	Nominated	

== Adaptations ==
Language	Title	Original release	Network(s)	Last aired	Notes	Ref.
Tamil	Ayyanar Thunai அய்யனார் துணை	27 January 2025	Star Vijay	Ongoing	Original	
Kannada	Shree Gandhadagudi ಶ್ರೀ ಗಂಧದಗುಡಿ	6 October 2025	Colors Kannada	Ongoing	Remake	
Malayalam	Kattathe Kilikkoodu കാറ്റത്തെ കിളിക്കൂട്	10 November 2025	Asianet	Ongoing	Remake	
Telugu	Podarillu పొదరిల్లు	8 December 2025	Star Maa	Ongoing	Remake	
Marathi	Bai Tuza Ashirvad बाई तुझा आशीर्वाद	27 April 2026	Star Pravah	Ongoing	Remake	
Hindi	Bareilly Ke Bacchan बरेली के बच्चन	8 June 2026	Colors TV	Ongoing	Remake	
Bengali	Aashirbad আশীর্বাদ	28 September 2026	Star Jalsha	Ongoing	Remake	
