= Ganga Kaveri =

- Directed by: Vishnukanth B. J.
- Written by: B. A. Madhu (dialogues)
- Screenplay by: Vishnukanth B. J.
- Story by: Vishnukanth B. J.
- Produced by: R V Venkatappa
- Starring: Akshay; Mallika Kapoor; Mahhi Vij
- Cinematography: H. C. Venugopal
- Edited by: M. Thirupathi Reddy
- Music by: K. Kalyan
- Production company: Akshaya Production
- Release date: 28 November 2008
- Country: India
- Language: Kannada

Ganga Kaveri is a 2008 Indian Kannada-language romantic drama film directed by Vishnukanth B. J. and starring Arjun, Mallika Kapoor and Mahhi Vij. The names of the heroines, Ganga and Kaveri, are based on the respective rivers of the same name.

== Plot ==
Arjun, from an influential family in Kodagu district, is engaged to his childhood friend Kaveri (the Kaveri River originates in the Kodagu district). While he is in the Himalayas, he is saved from a fatal accident by Ganga from Kullu-Manali, whom he agrees to marry (Kullu and Manali are near the origin of the Ganga at Gomukh). Who he marries forms the rest of the story.

== Cast ==
- Akshay as Arjun
- Mallika Kapoor as Kaveri
- Mahhi Vij as Ganga
- Anant Nag as Arjun's father
- Ramesh Bhat as Kaveri's father
- Sharan as Arjun's friend
- Tara as Ganga's mother
- Chitra Shenoy as Kaveri's mother
- Vaijanath Biradar as Priest
- Roopa Devi as Arjun's mother

== Production ==
The song "Baaro Baaro Dosti" was shot in Bangkok.

== Soundtrack ==
The music was composed by K. Kalyan, who also wrote the lyrics. He won the Karnataka State Film Award for Best Lyricist for his work in this film.

Track listing
No.	Title	Singer(s)	Length
1.	"Ganga Kaveri"	S. P. Balasubrahmanyam	2:47
2.	"Ambara Ambaradaache"	S. P. Balasubrahmanyam	4:47
3.	"Ninnalu Nannalu Onde Usirata"	S. P. Balasubrahmanyam, K. S. Chithra	4:10
4.	"Aisi Ladaki"	Bharat, Shruti G. Rao	4:33
5.	"Baaro Baaro Dosti"	Kunal Ganjawala	5:11
6.	"Moggina Manasina"	Ajay Warrier, K. S. Chithra	5:58
7.	"Sothe Kane"	Badi Prasad, Shruthi Srinath	4:51
8.	"Kodavaru Kalu"	S. P. Balasubrahmanyam, Sunitha S Murali, Shruthi Srinath, Sunitha Sanje	4:21
Total length:			36:38

== Reception ==
A critic from Bangalore Mirror wrote that "The actors are grossly under utilised while Venu manages to capture the beautiful locals in all their splendour. Throw in the few good songs by K Kalyan but there is nothing else about Ganga Kaveri worth paying a visit to the theatre". A critic from Rediff.com wrote that "Ganga Cauvery is better than the present crop of films. It is slow but still good for a family viewing". A critic from IANS wrote that "Despite its many technical high points, Ganga Cauvery turns out to be just another ordinary fare".
