= Satya Sarkar =

Indian cricketer

Satya Sarkar was an Indian cricketer who played for Assam.

Sarkar made a single first-class appearance for the team, during the 1992–93 season, against Tripura. From the tailend, he scored a duck in the only innings in which he batted, as the team won by an innings margin.

Sarkar conceded 28 runs from 8 overs with the ball.
