= Poove Unakkaga =

Poove Unakkaga (lit. 'Flowers for You') may refer to:

- Poove Unakkaga (film), a 1996 Indian Tamil-language romantic comedy film starring Vijay
- Poove Unakkaga (TV series), a 2020 Indian Tamil-language soap opera
