= Subha Sankalpam =

1995 film by K. Viswanath

- Theatrical release poster
- Directed by: K. Viswanath
- Written by: K. Viswanath
- Produced by: S. P. Balasubrahmanyam
- Starring: Kamal Haasan; Aamani; Priya Raman
- Cinematography: P. C. Sreeram
- Edited by: G. G. Krishna Rao
- Music by: M. M. Keeravani
- Production company: Sri Kodandapani Film Circuit
- Release date: 28 April 1995
- Country: India
- Language: Telugu

Subha Sankalpam (transl. Good resolve) is a 1995 Indian Telugu-language film directed by K. Viswanath and produced by S. P. Balasubrahmanyam. The film stars Kamal Haasan, Aamani and Priya Raman in lead roles, with Viswanath playing a significant supporting role. The cinematography was handled by P. C. Sreeram, and the music was composed by M. M. Keeravani. The film received five Nandi Awards and three Filmfare Awards. It was later dubbed into Tamil as Paasavalai. This film marked the last straight, non-bilingual Telugu film of Kamal Hassan as a solo lead.

== Plot ==
In a coastal village, Dasu, a gentle fisherman, lives with his paternal grandmother, Lakshmamma. Dasu harbors profound reverence and loyalty for Raayudu, a respected village patriarch. When Raayudu's granddaughter, Sandhya, a medical student, arrives in the village with her friends, she strikes up a friendship with Dasu. Meanwhile, Dasu falls in love with Ganga, an innocent local carpenter, who reciprocates his affection. Recognizing their pure bond, Raayudu blesses and solemnizes their marriage, and the couple welcomes a son, Chinna.

The household faces conflict when Raayudu's adopted son, Dattudu, accumulates significant gambling debts. To clear his liabilities, Dattudu plots to steal his father's wealth. Sensing the danger, Raayudu entrusts Dasu with a large box of cash meant to build a housing colony, a hospital, and a school for the local fishing community. Taking advantage of Dasu's absence while he is out at sea, Dattudu's creditor, Kota, sends his men to steal the money. Lakshmamma and Ganga fiercely defend the trust; however, Lakshmamma is slain in the altercation. Ganga manages to flee with the treasury box onto a boat, but Kota's men pursue her, causing her to fall into the sea along with the chest. While fishing later that day, Dasu casts his net and hauls up the unconscious Ganga clinging tightly to the box.

Dasu brings Ganga ashore, where a distruaght Raayudu awaits them. Overcome with accountability for the incident, Raayudu suffers a stroke. Sandhya returns home to tend to her grandfather and alongside Raayudu, assumes temporary care of the infant Chinna. At the city hospital, physicians inform Dasu that Ganga's internal injuries are fatal and she has only hours to live. Fearing that the shocking news will compromise Raayudu's fragile health, Dasu resolves to keep her condition a secret. He takes the unconscious Ganga on a final boat ride into the deep sea, where he prays to the ocean before she passes away in his arms.

To preserve the facade for Raayudu's wellbeing, Dasu claims that Ganga is recovering in the city and performs her cremation secretly at night. Sandhya witnesses the clandestine cremation. Although she implores him to disclose the truth to Raayudu, Dasu refuses to risk his health. Soon after, to mark his sixtieth birthday, Raayudu inaugurates the new welfare facilities and insists that Ganga and Dasu perform the auspicious rituals. Dasu poignantly steps forward alone and performs the sacred rituals using Ganga's ashes. The revelation shocks the gathered congregation, plunging the community into mourning. A deeply moved Raayudu is consoled by Dasu as they absorb the truth .

Acknowledging Dasu's circumstances, Sandhya offers to raise Chinna and takes him to the United States to ensure his upbringing. Seven years pass, during which Dasu successfully oversees Raayudu's business enterprises, while Raayudu transitions to a spiritual life in an ashram. Sandhya returns from the United States to reunite the boy with his father. Entrusting Dasu with the child's future guidance, she returns to America. Later, when Dasu visits Raayudu at the ashram, the patriarch reveals that Sandhya had developed feelings for Dasu but chose not to confess them out of respect for his devotion to Ganga, remaining unmarried due to her silent love for him. The film concludes as a contemplative Dasu reflects on Sandhya's sacrifice, while his son waves at a passing airplane as they venture back out to sea.

== Cast ==
- Kamal Haasan as Dasu
- Aamani as Ganga
- K. Viswanath as Rayudu
- Priya Raman as Sandhya
- Kota Srinivasa Rao
- Gollapudi Maruti Rao as Chennakesava Rao
- Nirmalamma
- Rallapalli as Bheema Raju
- Sakshi Ranga Rao
- Sameer
- Mallikharjunarao
- Sanjay Asrani
- Sri Lakshmi
- Vaishnavi Aravind

== Production ==
The film was mostly shot on coastal areas of Appikonda village in Visakhapatnam and some coastal and other areas in Vizianagaram.

== Music ==
Subha Sankalpam

Soundtrack album by M. M. Keeravani
- Released: 1995
- Genre: Feature film soundtrack
- Length: 28:12
- Language: Telugu
- Label: Echo

M. M. Keeravani chronology
Bobbili Simham (1994)	Subha Sankalpam (1995)	Gharana Bullodu (1995)
External audio
- Audio Jukebox on YouTube

The music for the film was composed by M. M. Keeravani, with lyrics penned by Veturi and Sirivennela Seetharama Sastry. The album was a major success, with all tracks becoming popular, particularly the song "Seetamma Andalu," performed by S. P. Balasubrahmanyam, K. S. Chithra, and S. P. Sailaja. Sailaja's rendition earned her the Nandi Award for Best Female Playback Singer, marking her first win in the category.

Keeravani also received the Filmfare Award for Best Music Director for his work on the film. He utilized Chithra's voice for Priya Raman, Sailaja's voice for Aamani to provide a folk-style touch, and Pallavi's voice for background music with a Hollywood influence. The song "Narudu Bratuku Nartana," sung by S. P. Balasubrahmanyam, incorporated elements from Ilayaraja's hit track in Sagara Sangamam (1983) and referenced two tracks from the film itself, "Chiranjeevi Soubhagyavathi" and "Seetamma Andalu."

Telugu tracklist

Track list
No.	Title	Lyrics	Singer(s)	Length
1.	"Seetamma Andalu"	Veturi	S. P. Balasubrahmanyam, K. S. Chithra, S. P. Sailaja & Chorus	04:59
2.	"Moodu Mullu"	Veturi	S. P. Balasubrahmanyam, S. P. Sailaja & Chorus	05:06
3.	"Haillessa Hailessa"	Sirivennela Seetharama Sastry	S. P. Balasubrahmanyam, K. S. Chithra, S. P. Pallavi & Chorus	04:11
4.	"Chiranjeevi Soubhagyavathi"	Veturi	S. P. Balasubrahmanyam, K. S. Chithra & S. P. Pallavi	02:17
5.	"Srisailamlo"	Vennelakanti	S. P. Balasubrahmanyam & Chorus	03:00
6.	"Narudu Bratuku Natana"	Veturi	S. P. Balasubrahmanyam	03:25
7.	"Chukkalanni Kalisi"	Veturi	S. P. Balasubrahmanyam & S. P. Sailaja	03:06
8.	"Hari Paadana (Hailessa- 2)"	Veturi	K. S. Chithra	02:08
Total length:				28:12

Tamil tracklist

- Seethaiyamma - S. P. Balasubrahmanyam, K. S. Chithra, S. P. Sailaja
- Poomaalai - S. P. Balasubrahmanyam, S. P. Sailaja
- Sree Rangathu - S. P. Balasubrahmanyam
- Indha Kadudhasikku - S. P. Balasubrahmanyam, K. S. Chithra
- Kadu Malaigal - S. P. Balasubrahmanyam, S. P. Sailaja
- Ulaga Vaazhkai - S. P. Balasubrahmanyam
- Sree Hariyin Paadham - S. P. Balasubrahmanyam, K. S. Chithra

== Reception ==
Subha Sankalpam was released on April 28, 1995. The film won five Nandi Awards.

The film was later dubbed into Tamil as Paasavalai, released on July 28, 1995. This version was distributed by Kamal Haasan's own production company, Raaj Kamal Films International. Reviewing this version for Tamil magazine Kalki, R. P. R. wrote it is possible only for the best directors to bring a unique actor to his style and make him show a new dimension. K. Viswanath has achieved. In that sense it is not a Kamal film; Viswanath film.

== Awards ==
Nandi Awards

- Best Actress – Aamani
- Best Supporting Actress – Vaishnavi Aravind
- Best Character Actor – K. Viswanath
- Best Female Playback Singer – S. P. Sailaja
- Best Editor – G.G.Krishna Rao

Filmfare Awards South

- Best Film – Telugu – S. P. Balasubrahmanyam
- Best Director – Telugu – K. Viswanath
- Best Music Director – Telugu – M. M. Keeravani
