= Chakravyuham =

- Directed by: Balu Mahendra
- Starring: Suman; Archana; Gautami; Pradeep Shakthi
- Cinematography: Balu Mahendra
- Music by: Ilaiyaraaja
- Release date: 1992
- Country: India
- Language: Telugu

Chakravyuham (transl. Chakravyuha) is a 1992 Indian Telugu-language thriller film directed by Balu Mahendra starring Suman, Gautami, and Archana. The music was composed by Ilaiyaraaja. The film was dubbed in Tamil as Vasanthame Varuga.

== Plot ==
The story revolves around Archana who was once attempted to be killed by the antagonist, a psychopath. Suman, as a reporter to a newspaper, helps Archana to chase the antagonists after Archana disguises as pop singer to trap him.

== Cast ==
- Suman
- Archana
- Gowthami
- Allu Ramalingaiah
- Pradeep Shakthi

== Soundtrack ==
The soundtrack was composed by Ilaiyaraaja.

Track listing
No.	Title	Singer(s)	Length
1.	"Naa Sari Sogasari"	K. S. Chithra	04:36
2.	"Asalu Pooche"	S. P. Balasubrahmanyam, K. S. Chithra	04:38
3.	"Kougiline"	S. P. Sailaja	04:37
4.	"Gokulame Needira"	K. S. Chithra	07:09
5.	"Lip Kiss Lippu Ragam"	S. P. Balasubrahmanyam, K. S. Chithra	04:39
6.	"Vampuko Sompunnadi"	S. P. Balasubrahmanyam, K. S. Chithra	05:23
Total length:			31:02

== Reception ==
Reviewing The Tamil dubbed version Vasanthame Varuga, AP of The Indian Express noted this "film does no credit to Balu Mahendra but all the same it has credible storyline and the photography [..] is appealing".

== Awards ==
Gowthami won the Nandi Award for Best Supporting Actress for this film.
