= Rambantu =

- DVD cover
- Directed by: Bapu
- Written by: Mullapudi Venkata Ramana
- Produced by: M. Chitti Babu; G. Gnaram Harish; Rajendra Prasad (presents)
- Starring: Rajendra Prasad; Eswari Rao
- Cinematography: P. R. K. Raju
- Edited by: K. S. Raju
- Music by: M. M. Keeravani
- Production company: Vijaya Chamundeswari Movies
- Release date: 8 September 1995
- Running time: 152 mins
- Country: India
- Language: Telugu

Rambantu is a 1995 Indian Telugu-language drama film directed by Bapu and written by Mullapudi Venkata Ramana. It stars Rajendra Prasad, Eswari Rao and music composed by M. M. Keeravani. It was produced by M. Chitti Babu and G. Gnaram Harish under the Vijaya Chamundeswari Movies banner and presented by Rajendra Prasad.

== Plot ==
The film begins with the hunting of a generous Zamindar Raja Ramachandra Prasad when a tribal warrior sacrifices his life to guard him. Before leaving his breath, he endorses his gallant kid Rambantu to him, whom he accompanies. Zamindar resides with his wife, Indrani, and 4 progenies. Being a harpy, Indrani despises Rambantu and spoils his civilization. Years roll by, and Rambantu molds into Zamindar's true blue by dedicating his life. Despite being illiterate, he is an eidetic with a talent for divine naturopathy. Parallelly, Zamindar's two sons are vagabonds, and Indrani scorns benevolent elder daughter Kaveri since she is a step. The solitary who showers affection to her is Rambantu.

Meanwhile, Gireesam, a slick dandy, intrudes into Zamindar's house by forging as an A-list celebrity. He counterfeits them immediately by digging their most valuable ancestors' treasures. Gireesam mesmerizes with his backhanded means of lucrative opportunities and clutches the authority. Anyhow, Rambantu feels something fishy. The blackguard currently puts a lousy eye on Kaveri when Rambantu counterstrikes him. Hence, Gireesam's ruses are enraged by projecting Kaveri's horoscope, which poses an inevitable death for her spouse. Then, she is confirmed to be ominous, faces mortification, and attempts suicide. Rambantu shields and ties the Mangalasutram wedding chain to remove her curse. Gireesam schemes the deed as fraud and batters Rambantu when Zamindar expels the two. Ergo, they set foot in the city and started a small-scale business for livelihood. Besides, Gireesam swindles the totality by investing in phony companies, grabs Indrani's dower, and snares Zamindar's younger Jayasri via his henchman Raana. Discerning the facets, Zamindar collapses and comprehends Gireesam's dark shade.

Once, Rambantu secures a wealthy Ambiraju, who gazes at his outstanding brilliance in naturopathy and establishes a holistic healing institute. Step by step, Rambantu grows as a tycoon. Though Kaveri endears and aspires to be near him, he keeps her apart because, under faith, the day after his death, Kaveri will get a wise husband. Due to the dire need for money, Zamindar walks to Ambiraju when Rambantu spots and felicitates him. Consequently, he learns Rambantu's eminence by knowing his real intention in knitting her. Following this, Rambantu is conscious of the status quo and moves a counter pawn. Thus, he hauls the Gireesam likewise, retrieves his Lord's riches, and reforms his men. Hereupon, Gireesam attacks Zamindar and forcibly tries to snatch his fort. At last, Rambantu flares up & ceases him when he reads that Kaveri's astrology is also a ploy, so Rambantu seeks a penalty. Finally, the movie ends happily with Zamindar announcing Rambantu as his son-in-law and unites him with Kaveri.

== Cast ==
- Rajendra Prasad as Rambantu
- Eswari Rao as Kaveri
- Satyanarayana as Raja Ramachandra Prasad / Doragaru
- Kota Srinivasa Rao as Girisam
- A.V.S. as Ambiraju
- Brahmanandam
- Gundu Sudarshan as Japan
- Rajeev Kanakala as Jayakrishna
- Jakki as Raana
- Jyoti Reddy
- Krishna Sri as Jayasri
- Y. Vijaya as Rani Indrani
- Suresh Kondeti
- Baby Aishwarya in the song "Emo Gurram Egaravachu"

== Soundtrack ==
Rambantu

Film score by M. M. Keeravani
- Released: 1996
- Genre: Soundtrack
- Length: 19:36
- Label: Supreme Music
- Producer: M. M. Keeravani

M. M. Keeravani chronology
Gharana Bullodu (1995)	Rambantu (1996)	Mounam (1995)

Music composed by M. M. Keeravani. Lyrics written by Veturi. Music released on Supreme Music Company.

No.	Title	Singer(s)	Length
1.	"Allarenduku"	S. P. Balasubrahmanyam, Chitra	2:21
2.	"Chandamama Kanchavetti"	S. P. Balasubrahmanyam, Chitra	4:50
3.	"Emo Gurram Egaravachu"	S. P. Balasubrahmanyam	4:19
4.	"Bala Chilaka"	Chitra	3:11
5.	"Kukuteswara Kunuku"	S. P. Balasubrahmanyam	4:55
Total length:			19:36

== Awards ==
- Master Uday won Nandi Award for Best Child Actor of this film.

== Other ==
- VCDs and DVDs on - SHALIMAR Video Company, Hyderabad
