= Endrendrum Punnagai (TV series) =

Indian Tamil-language soap opera

- Genre: Drama
- Written by: Dialogues; Selva Vadivel
- Screenplay by: G. Sabarinathan
- Directed by: Ramakrishna "R.K." (Episode 1-90); Bagavathi Raj (Episode 91-present)
- Starring: Nakshatra Srinivas; Nithin Iyer; Deepak Kumar; Kavitha
- Theme music composer: Hari
- Opening theme: "Endrendrum Punnagai Kaatrinile"
- Country of origin: India
- Original language: Tamil
- No. of seasons: 1
- No. of episodes: 569

Production
- Executive producer: Esai Vanan
- Producer: Neelima Rani
- Camera setup: Multi-camera
- Running time: approx. 20-22 minutes per episode
- Production company: Esai Pictures

Original release
- Network: Zee Tamil
- Release: 16 March 2020 – 6 May 2022

Endrendrum Punnagai (transl. Everlasting smile) is an Indian Tamil-language television drama airing on Zee Tamil. It premiered on 16 March 2020 and ended on 6 May 2022, starring Nakshatra Srinivas with Nithin Iyer, Deepak Kumar and Kavitha This series is produced by Esai Pictures of actress Neelima Rani.

Thendral, a radio jockey, gets into trouble when she gets betrothed to Aakash, a man who is excessively influenced by his grandmother. But she tries to find a way to be with her lover, Siddharth.

== Synopsis ==
Aandal is a kind of woman whose anger no one dares to face when she is displeased. Aakash, is the grandson of Aandal, who always obeys his grandmother. Aandal seeks a bride for Aakash, and has clear criteria for those who wish to marry him. She comes across Thendral, a radio jockey, and gathers all the information about her while also being impressed by Thendral. Then, she decides that Thendral is the right girl for Aakash to marry. Thendral's family accept to Aandal's approach for Thendral to marry Aakash.

Later, Thendral learns that Aakash is his grandmother's puppet. In addition, Thendral dislikes that Aakash has no individuality and at times she even rejected the marriage proposal. On the other hand, Siddharth is also a radio jockey, who works with Thendral and falls in love with her. The rest of the story revolves around Thendral's choice between Aakash and Siddharth.

== Cast ==
=== Main ===
- Nakshatra Srinivas as RJ Thendral (2020–2022)
  - A middle-class family woman, Shanmugam and Lakshmi's daughter, works as a radio jockey "RJ" at 92.7 Big FM radio station. She was Aakash's first ex-fiancée and Siddhu's girlfriend turned wife. She agreed to marry Aakash on her mother's insistence but later called off their marriage after learning Aandal's true intentions through Saradha.
- Kavitha as Aandal Arunachalam "Aandal" (2020–2022)
  - An arrogant and wealthy lady, Siddhu and Aakash's grandmother. She was inspired by Thendral's voice in FM and she decided that Aakash should marry Thendral, but it fails. After she considers Thendral as her enemy. She loves her grandson Aakash, however, it isn't the same for Siddhu because he is Saradha's son
- Nithin Iyer as Aakash (2020–2022)
  - A rich business man, Kanna and Madhavi's son, Siddhu's younger step-brother, his grandmother Aandal's obeying grandson and Thendral's ex-fiancé and Nila's husband. He loved Thendral, but he does not take a stand for her (Thendral) against his grandmother and now he is the husband of Nila approved by his grandma.
- Deepak Kumar (2020–2022) / Vishnukanth (2022) as Siddharth "Siddhu"
  - A simple independent man, Kanna and Saradha's son, Aakash elder step brother and Thendral's current boyfriend turned husband, works with Thendral as RJ at 92.7 Big FM radio station and falls in love with her. He always supports Thendral in all her decisions.
- Punitha Balakrishnan (2020) / Sreenidhi Sudarshan (2020–2021) / Sushma Nair (2021–2022) as Nila Aakash
  - Thendral's first younger sister; Shanmugam and Lakshmi's second daughter. She always like a luxuries life, so she married Aakash with her mother's help. Now she against Aandal and defeating her.

=== Recurring ===
- Rajeshwari as Saradha Kannan: Siddhu's mother, Aandal and Arunachalam's first daughter-in-law, Kanna's first wife. Aandal's arch-rival. She was bold woman. She thrown out by Aandal during her pregnancy, by not accepting to Aandal's condition to abort her child. She rescued Thendral from marrying Aakash exposing Aandal's true face. She wants Thendral to marry Siddhu. (2020–2022)
- Ragavi Sasikumar (2020–2021) / Anitha Venkat (2021–2022) / Preethi Shree (2022) as Madhavi Kannan: Aakash's mother, Aandal and Arunachalam's second daughter-in-law, Kanna's second wife. She was married to Kanna, hiding his first marriage. She loves her son Aakash
- Supergood Kannan (2020–2022) / Ashok (2022) as Kannan: Siddhu and Aakash's father, Aandal and Arunachalam's son, Saradha and Madhavi's husband. He is a good person, looking after Aakash's business. He is unable to save either of his wives from his mother's atrocities.
- Narasimha Raju as Arunachalam: Aandal's husband, Kanna's father, Saradha and Madhavi's father-in-law, Siddhu and Aakash's grandfather. Though being a retired judge and a respectable person, he never raises voice against his wife. (2020–2022)
- Gowthami Vembunathan as Lakshmi Shanmugam: Thendral, Nila, Poorni and Shiva's mother, Shanmugam's wife. She forces Thendral to marry Aakash due to his status and she doesn't care about Thendral's self esteem. (2020–2022)
- Girish as Shanmugam: Thendral, Nila, Poorni and Shiva's father, Lakshmi's husband. He always supports Thendral in all her decisions. He is a broad minded person, unlike his wife. (2020–2022)
- Dhachayani as Poornima Shanmugam "Poorni": Thendral's second younger sister; Shanmugam and Lakshmi's last daughter. (2020–2022)
- Indran as Siruthai: FM staff; Thendral and Siddhu's friend. (2020–2022)
- VJ Sasikala Nagarajan as Meghna: FM staff; Thendral and Siddhu's friend. (2020–2022)
- Nivetha Priya as Tara: Aakash's second ex-fiancée and a business man's daughter (2021–2022)
- Nithya Raj as Shivani: A new FM manager in Big FM and she loved Siddhu has one-sided. (2021–2022)
- Dharshan Kumar as Shiva: Thendral's younger brother; Shanmugam and Lakshmi's son (2020–2021)
- Murali Krish as Singaram: An old FM manager in Big FM (2020–2021)

== Production ==
=== Casting ===
The series mainly on a love triangle. Nakshatra Srinivas stars as a radio jockey in the main female role with Deepak Kumar, of Thirumanam fame, and Nithin Iyer, a fitness frick as the male leads. Kavitha was cast in the antagonist role as the grandmother, while Narasimha Raju, Gowthami Vembunathan, Girish, Raghavi, Kannan, VJ Sasikala, and Indran make up the rest of the cast.

=== Development ===
Neelima Rani, who producing this series after Niram Maaratha Pookkal with her husband Esai Vanan under the production "Esai Pictures" in Zee Tamil.

== Relaunch ==
The series premiered on 16 March 2020. Due to COVID-19 pandemic, the series stopped broadcasting on 27 March 2020, airing only ten episodes. The series resumed broadcast on 27 July 2020, re-airing from its first episode, when television shoots were once again permitted in India.

== Special and crossover episodes ==
- Endrendrum Punnagai cast and crew amalgamated the episodes called Triveni Sangamam with Rettai Roja and Rajamagal from 26 December 2020 to 9 January 2021. This was the first time in Tamil television for three series to be combined.

== Adaptations ==
Language	Title	Original release	Network(s)	Last aired	Notes
Telugu	Mangamma Gari Manavaralu మంగమ్మ గారి మనవరాలు	3 June 2013	Zee Telugu	28 April 2017	Original
Tamil	Endrendrum Punnagai என்றென்றும் புன்னகை	16 March 2020	Zee Tamil	6 May 2022	Remake

== Title ==
The title was taken from a 2013 Endrendrum Punnagai movie starring Jeeva, Trisha, Vinay, Santhanam and Andrea. The English meaning of this title is Everlasting Smile.
