= Kokila Enge Pogiraal (TV series) =

- Genre: Soap opera
- Opening theme: "Puthamai penne"
- Country of origin: India
- Original language: Tamil
- No. of seasons: 1

Production
- Producer: Shivaji productions
- Running time: approx. 24-28 minutes per episode

Original release
- Network: Sun TV
- Release: 1999 – 2001

Kokila Enge Pogiraal is an Indian Tamil-language soap opera that aired on Sun TV from 1999 to 2001 and produced under the banner by shivaji productions and It shifted to the 11.30AM slot. This serial was replaced by the hit serial Neelavanam. The screenplay, dialogue, and direction was made by C. V. Rajendran.

== Cast ==
- Easwari Rao as kokila
- Devi priya as kokila's friend priya
- Sabitha Anand as kokila's mother
- Vichithra as lawyer's wife
- Rajesh as Kokila's father
- O. A. K. Sundar as politician
- Nagalakshmi
