= Niram Maaratha Pookkal (TV series) =

- Genre: Soap opera
- Written by: S. Kumaresan
- Screenplay by: Dialogues; Venkat. G
- Directed by: M. Iniyan Dinesh (1-234); P.Niravi Pandiyan (234-397); P.S.Dharan (398-593)
- Starring: Mohammed Azeem; Nishma; Deepa Jayan
- Music by: Vishal Chandrashekhar
- Opening theme: "Kanavulla Pootha Poo" sung by Sinduri Vishal
- Country of origin: India
- Original language: Tamil
- No. of episodes: 593

Production
- Executive producer: Esai Vanan
- Producer: Neelima Rani
- Cinematography: Arujunan Karthick; Sumee Baskaran
- Editor: S. Mahesh
- Camera setup: Multi-camera
- Running time: 22 minutes
- Production company: Esai Pictures

Original release
- Network: Zee Tamil
- Release: 9 October 2017 – 21 February 2020

Niram Maaratha Pookkal (transl. Flowers that do not change colors) is an Indian Tamil-language soap opera, starring Mohammed Azeem with Deepa Jayan and Nishma. It started on Zee Tamil on 9 October 2017 on Monday to Friday at 14:00 (IST). From Monday 12 August 2019, the show was moved to Monday to Friday at 1:30pm (IST). It ended on 21 February 2020 after 593 episodes. The show was produced by the actress Neelima Rani with her husband Esai Vanan under Esai Pictures. It examines a love triangle.

== Synopsis ==
It is a story about a village girl Venmathi, who is in love with her teenage crush Ram, who is in a far away city and is in love with city-based fashionable girl, Keerthy. Circumstances forces the hero to marry the heroine. The struggle of the heroine to safeguard from revealing herself to the hero and the hero's struggle, between the two women forms the crux of the story.

== Cast ==
=== Main ===
- Mohammed Azeem as Ram and Krish (Ramkrishnan) (Venmathi's and Keerthy's husband)
- Nishma Chengappa as Keerthy (Ram's second wife)
- Deepa Jayan as Venmathi Ram (Ram's first wife)

=== Supporting ===
- Dhakshayini as Ram's mother
- Geethanjali as Jyothi
- Swapna as Ram's sister
- Navin Victor as Anbu
- Ashritha Sreedas as Roja
- Jerom as Roja's Would Be
- Yuvanraj Nethran as Devaraj
- Ashwin Karthik as Vasu
- Babitha as Anbu's mother
- Mithun Raj as Mahesh
- Murali Krish as Moorthy
- Gowthami Vembunathan as Muthulakshmi
- Dharish Jayaseelan as Inspector Sathish

=== Former ===
- Muralie Krishnan as Ram and Krish (replaced by Mohammad Azeem)
- Vishnupriya as Venmathi (replaced by Deepa Jayan)
- Ashmitha as Vemathi (replaced by Vishnupriya)
- Murali Krish as Murali
- Shyam as Anbu (replaced By Navin Victor)

== Production ==
=== Development ===
The show was produced by Rani, producing a series for the first time with her husband Esai Vanan and also this was her debut to produce the TV serial. After this series ended, she produced the new series Endrendrum Punnagai, also on Zee Tamil.

=== Title song ===
The series Title track "Kanavulla Pootha Poo" was composed by Vishal Chandrashekhar and sung by Sinduri Vishal.

=== Series crew ===
- Co-director: E. Ravisuba and Ashok
- Dialogue: S. Venkat
- Co-screenwriter: Jo. Jorge
- Background music: Hari
- Editor: S. Mahesh
- Location: Muttom, Kanyakumari and Nagar Kovil among surroundings

=== Title ===
This title was taken from a 1979 Niram Maaratha Pookkal movie starring Sudhakar, Radhika and Vijayan. The English meaning of this title is Flowers that don't change colors.

=== Airing history ===
Aired	Time	Episodes
9 October 2017 - 9 August 2017	Monday - Friday; 2:00PM (IST)	1-440
12 August 2019 - 21 February 2020	Monday - Friday; 1:30PM (IST)	441-593
