= Naari: The Women =

Indian Telugu language film

Naari (The Women)
- Theatrical release poster
- Directed by: Surya Vantipalli
- Produced by: Sashi Vantipalli
- Starring: Aamani; Pragathi; Vikas Vasistha; Karthikeya Dev; Nithya Sree; Mounika Reddy; Kedar Shankar
- Cinematography: Bhim Samba; V.Ravi Kumar
- Edited by: Madhav Kumar Gullapalli
- Music by: Vinod Kumar Vinnu
- Production companies: SHE Films; Hyderabad Studios
- Release date: 7 March 2025
- Running time: 159 min
- Country: India
- Language: Telugu

Naari (The Women) is a 2025 Indian Telugu language film directed by Surya Vantipalli and produced by Sashi Vantipalli under SHE Films banner.The film stars Aamani, Vikas Vasistha, Karthikeya Dev, Mounika Reddy, Nityha Sree, Pragathi and Kedar Shankar.

== Plot ==
The film's plot revolves around the life of a young woman who was raised under the strict control of her patriarchal father. She flees with a man she recently met in search of freedom, but soon after, his true nature is exposed, and he begins to take advantage of her. As things worsen, she kills him and tries to make it appear as though she committed suicide. Time goes on, and she has a son, determined to raise him to be a good person, but she makes a difficult choice that fundamentally alters her son's future.

== Cast ==
- Aamani as Bharathi
- Pragathi as Sharada
- Vikas Vasistha
- Karthikeya Dev
- Nithya Sree
- Mounika Reddy as the teenage Bharathi
- Kedar Shankar
- Naga Mahesh as Minister Bhupathi

== Release and reception ==
Naari (The Women) was theatrically released on 7 March 2025.

Suhas Sistu of The Hans India said, "Naari is a gripping social drama with a powerful message, engaging screenplay, strong performances, and an emotional climax, making it a must-watch for families, especially parents and their teenage children". A critic from the Deccan Chronicle said, "If you're seeking a thought-provoking film that tackles tough topics while offering hope, Naari is a must-watch".
