= Aamani =

Indian actress and politician (born 1972)

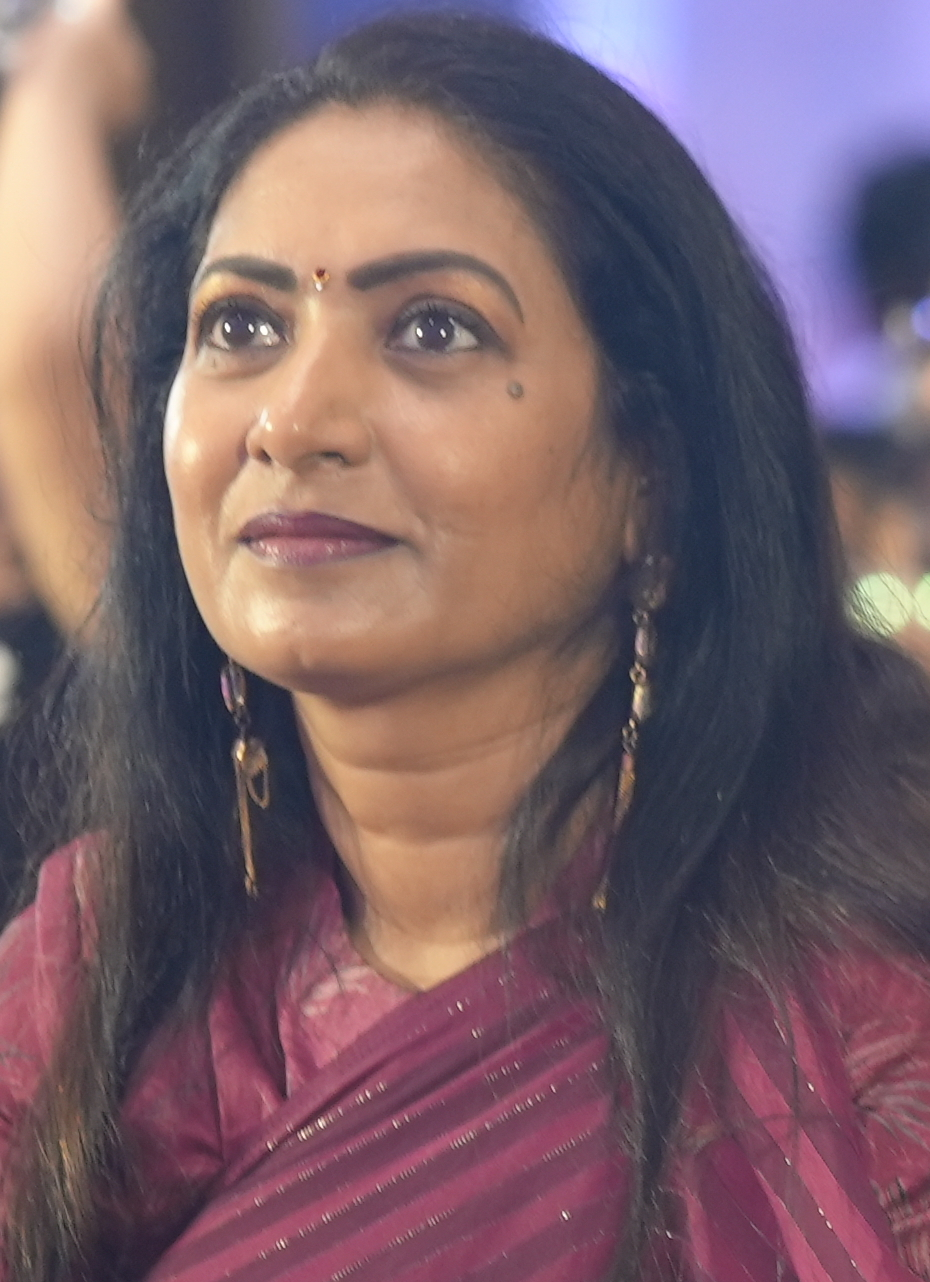
- Born: Manjula; 16 November 1972 (age 53); Bengaluru, Karnataka, India
- Occupation: Actress
- Years active: 1990–1997; 2004–present
- Political party: Bharatiya Janata Party (2025–present)
- Awards: Nandi Awards; Filmfare Awards South

Manjula, commonly known as Aamani (born 16 November 1972), is an Indian actress and politician who works primarily in Telugu films in addition to a few Tamil and Kannada films. She made her debut in a lead role in the Telugu film Jamba Lakidi Pamba (1992), directed by E. V. V. Satyanarayana. The film turned out to be a blockbuster. She has received two state Nandi Awards and one Filmfare Awards South.

She starred in the film Mister Pellam (1993) directed by Bapu, which won the National Film Award for Best Feature Film in Telugu. She won Filmfare Award for Best Actress – Telugu for the film Subha Lagnam (1994) and Nandi Award for Best Actress for the films Subha Sankalpam (1995) and Mister Pellam (1993).

== Early life ==
Aamani was born and raised in Bangalore. Her father Maadappa was a Kannada film distributor and mother Saroja is a housemaker. She has a brother and a sister.

== Career ==
Aamani started her career doing small roles in films like Aadadhi, Chandamama Kathalu, and others. Subsequently, she was paired as the lead actress opposite actors like Vishnuvardhan, Nagarjuna, Balakrishna, Krishna, Mammootty, Arvind Swami, Jagapathi Babu and Kamal Haasan. She won Filmfare Award for Best Actress – Telugu for the film Subha Lagnam and Nandi Award for Best Actress for the films Subha Sankalpam and Mister Pellam. After a hiatus of many years, she appeared in the 2004 film Aa Naluguru.

In the 1990s, Aamani appeared in successful films such as Amma Donga, Vamshanikokkadu, Subha Lagnam, Jamba Lakidi Pamba, and Nakshatra Poratam.

Aamani played a street vendor and actor Kartikeya’s onscreen mother in the 2021 Telugu-language romantic comedy-drama Chaavu Kaburu Challaga. She plays the money lender Kanaka Ratnam in Muthyamantha Muddu. In 2021 she made a guest appearance in Telugu reality show Drama Juniors.

== Political career ==
In December 2025, she joined the Bharatiya Janata Party in the presence of BJP Telangana state president N. Ramchander Rao and Union minister G. Kishan Reddy.

== Filmography ==
=== Telugu films ===
Year	Title	Role	Notes
1990	Adadhi		
1993	Jamba Lakidi Pamba	Rama Lakshmi	
1993	Mister Pellam	Jhansi	Nandi Award for Best Actress; Nominated – Filmfare Award for Best Actress – Telugu
1993	Pachani Samsaram	Bala	
1993	Amma Koduku		
1993	Shabash Ramu	Radha	
1993	Preme Naa Pranam	Priyanka	
1993	Kannayya Kittayya	Rukmini Devi	
1993	Chinnalludu	Rani	
1993	Anna Chellelu	Lakshmi	
1993	Srinatha Kavi Sarvabhowmudu	Damayanthi	
1993	Nakshatra Poratam	Driver Prasad sister	
1993	Repati Rowdy	Jayanthi	
1994	Srivari Priyuralu	Vasantha	
1994	Teerpu		
1994	Subha Lagnam	Radha	Filmfare Award for Best Actress – Telugu
1994	Allari Police	Geetha	
1994	Maro Quit India		
1994	Hello Brother	Herself	Cameo appearance in the song "Kanne Pettaro"
1995	Amma Donga	Alivelu	
1995	Gharana Bullodu	Malli	
1995	Sisindri	Geetha	
1995	Subha Sankalpam	Ganga	Nandi Award for Best Actress; Nominated – Filmfare Award for Best Actress – Telugu
1995	Maya Bazaar	Sasirekha	
1995	Subhamastu	Kasthuri	
1995	Idandi Maa Vaari Varasa		
1995	Kondapalli Rattaya	Sridevi	
1995	Aalumagalu	Malleeswari	
1996	Vamsanikokkadu	Sirisa	
1996	Maavi Chiguru	Seetha	
1996	Hello Guru	Swapna	
1996	Warning	Supriya	
1997	Vammo Vatto O Pellaamo		
1997	Subha Muhurtham		
1997	Kodalu Didhina Kaapuram		
1997	Priyamaina Srivaaru	Sandhya	
1998	Seethakka	Seetha	
2004	Swamy	Dr. Bharathi, Principal	
2004	Madhyanam Hathya	Lakshmi	
2004	Aa Naluguru	Bharathi	Nominated – Filmfare Award for Best Supporting Actress – Telugu
2012	Devastanam	Saraswathi	
2014	Chandamama Kathalu	Saritha	
2017	Patel S. I. R.	Bharathi	
2017	Middle Class Abbayi	Nani's aunt	
2018	Bharat Ane Nenu	Bharath's mother	
2018	Srinivasa Kalyanam	Seeta	
2018	Hello Guru Prema Kosame	Lakshmi	
2019	Prashnista	Annapurna	
2021	Sreekaram	Karthik's mother	
2021	Chaavu Kaburu Challaga	Gangamma	
2021	Ardha Shathabdham	Ramanna's wife	
2021	Amma Deevena		
2021	Republic	Abhiram's mother	
2021	Most Eligible Bachelor	Harsha's mother	
2022	Urvasivo Rakshasivo	Sree Kumar's mother	
2023	Vinaro Bhagyamu Vishnu Katha	Dharshana's mother	
2024	Music Shop Murthy	Jaya	
2024	Usha Parinayam	Honey’s mother	
2024	Mr. Celebrity	Janaki	
2024	Maa Nanna Superhero	Srinivas’ wife	
2024	Leela Vinodham		
2025	Baapu	Saroja	
2025	Naari	Bharathi	
2025	Dear Uma		
2025	Mathru		
2025	Meghalu Cheppina Prema Katha	Revathi	
2025	Ari: My Name is Nobody		
2025	School Life		
2025	Santhana Prapthirasthu	Rajeshwari	
2026	Vanaveera	Indhu’s mother	
2026	Cheekatilo	Padma	
2026	Son Of	Anand’s mother	

=== Other language films ===
Year	Title	Role	Language	Notes
1990	Puthiya Kaatru		Tamil	credited as Meenakshi
1991	Onnum Theriyadha Pappa		Tamil	credited as Meenakshi
1991	Theechatti Govindan		Tamil	credited as Meenakshi
1991	Thangamana Thangachi	Lakshmi	Tamil	credited as Meenakshi
1992	Idhuthanda Sattam	Amudha	Tamil	credited as Meenakshi
1992	Mudhal Seethanam		Tamil	credited as Meenakshi
1994	Honest Raj	Pushpa	Tamil	
1995	Engirundho Vandhan	Janaki	Tamil	
1995	Witness		Tamil	
1996	Balina Jyothi		Kannada	
1996	Appaji	Lakshmi	Kannada	
1997	Themmanggu Pattukaran	Sivagamiyin	Tamil	
1997	Pudhayal	Sundari	Tamil	

=== Television ===
Year	Title	Role	Network	Language
2020	Akka Mogudu	Janani	Gemini TV	Telugu
2020–2021	Poove Unakkaga	Rathinavalli	Sun TV	Tamil
2021–2022	Muthyamantha Muddu	Kanakarathnam	Zee Telugu	Telugu
2021	Parampara	Banumathi	Disney+ Hotstar	Telugu
2021	Drama Juniors	Guest appearance	ZEE5	Telugu
2022	Wow 3	Contestant	ETV	Telugu
2024–present	Kotthaga Rekkalochena		Gemini TV	Telugu
2024–present	Illu Illalu Pillalu	Vedawathi	Star Maa	Telugu
2024–present	Brinda	Vasundhara	SonyLIV	Telugu
