= Azhiyatha Kolangal 2 =

2019 film by M. R. Bharathi

- Theatrical release poster
- Directed by: M. R. Bharathi
- Produced by: Easwari Rao; Deva Sinha
- Starring: Prakash Raj; Revathi; Archana
- Cinematography: Rajesh K. Nair
- Edited by: Mu. Kasi Viswanathan
- Music by: Aravind Siddhartha
- Production company: Charulatha Films
- Release date: 29 November 2019
- Running time: 108 minutes
- Country: India
- Language: Tamil

Azhiyatha Kolangal 2 is a 2019 Tamil-language drama film written and directed by M. R. Bharathi and produced by Easwari Rao. A spiritual successor to the 1979 film Azhiyatha Kolangal, the film features starring Prakash Raj, Revathi and Archana in the leading roles, while Nassar appears in a pivotal role. Featuring music composed by Aravind Siddhartha, Azhiyatha Kolangal began production in September 2015.

== Cast ==
- Prakash Raj as Gowri Shankar
- Revathi as Sita, Gowri Shankar's wife
- Archana as Mohana, Gowri Shankar's ex-lover
- Easwari Rao as News Reader
- Nassar as Asst. Commissioner
- Mohan Raman as Doctor
- Vijay Krishnaraj as Politician
- Sathya Sai as Mohana's daughter

== Production ==
Debutant director Mani Bharathi quietly began working on a film project starring Prakash Raj, Revathi, Archana and Nassar in the lead roles during June 2015. Revathi and Archana had initially decided to produce the film, but former actress Easwari Rao later agreed to fund the project. The shoot progressed in Chennai, with Prakash Raj revealed to be portraying a writer, and the film developed under the tentative title of Kavingan Aakinaal Ennai. The film's first look poster was revealed on 14 January 2016, coinciding with Pongal.

== Reception ==
Times of India wrote "The only saving grace of the film is the performance of the lead characters. A lion's share of the film is shot indoors - the lack of novelty in visuals coupled with overdramatic dialogues and scenes spoil the plot". Cinema Express wrote "With heavyweights like Prakashraj, Revathi, Nasser, and Archana, the performances alone should have saved the film but when the director’s dialogues leave no room for expression, even the veterans can only do so much. Yet, the film tries to appeal to your heart. Bharathi’s thoughts are modern but his film is not. The film means well. It has good intentions, but good intentions don’t always make good cinema".
