= Neelima Rani =

Indian actress

Neelima Esai Rani
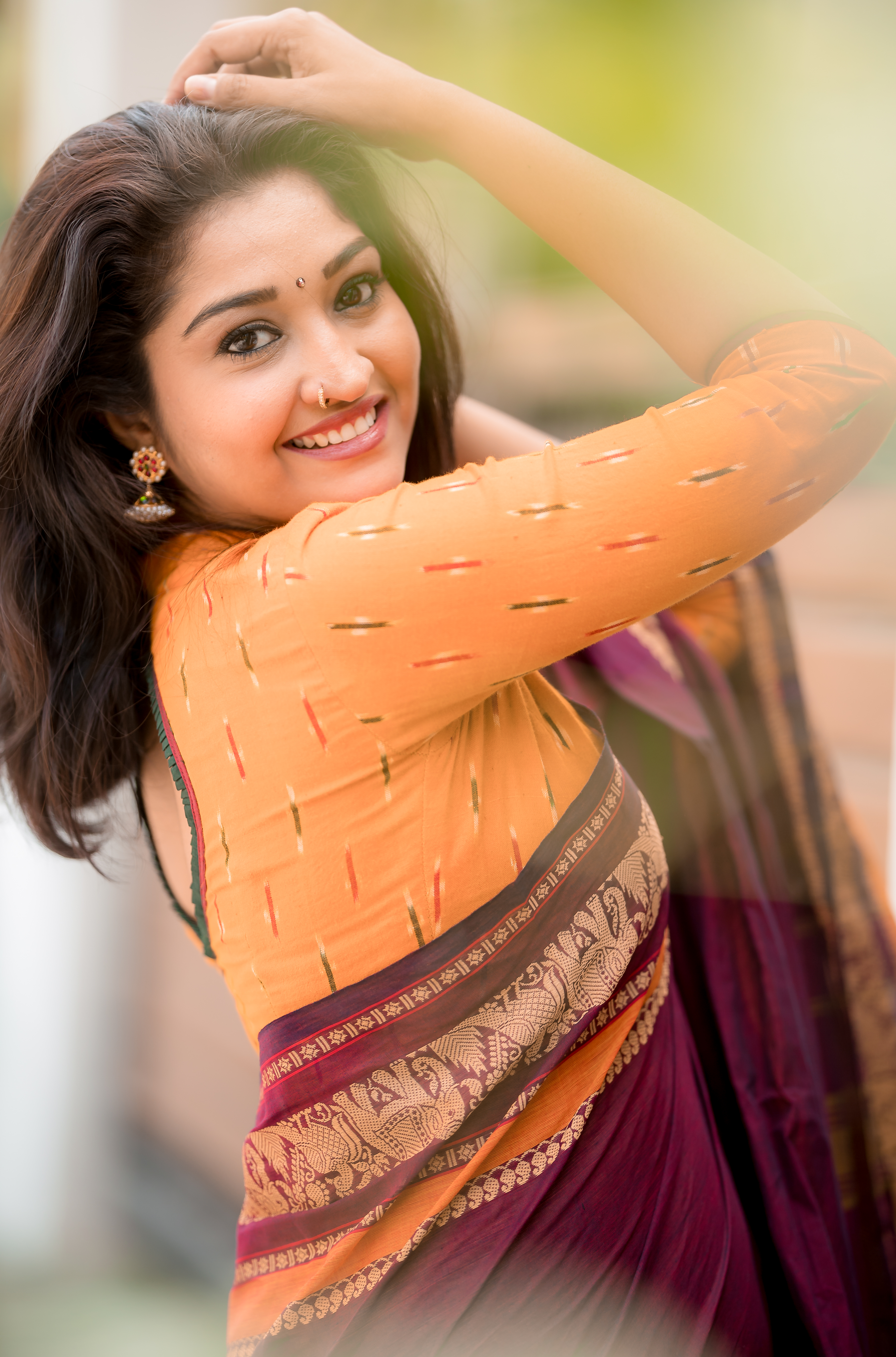
- Born: Chennai, Tamil Nadu, India
- Occupations: Actress and Producer
- Children: 2

Neelima Rani is an Indian actress, a dubbing artist and producer who is mainly known for her roles in Tamil-language soap operas and movies in antagonistic roles.

== Career ==
Neelima started her career in Oru Pennin Kathai when she was in school. In her summer vacations she also did feature films like Thevar Magan, Virumbugiren and Pandavar Bhoomi. When she was 15 she played the second heroine role in Acham Madam Airyppu — Brindavanam. She acted in the 850 episode Sun TV serial, Metti Oli in 2001.

In 2011, she announced that she would place roles on television serials behind her priorities to star in feature films. Her role as Karthi's friend in Naan Mahaan Alla won her Edison Award for Best Supporting Actress, before she went on to portray another pivotal role in Muran.

The actress has turned producer with K. S. Adhiyaman's venture Amali Thumali, a comedy film featuring Nakul, Shanthnu and Santhanam in the lead roles. Her duties as producer meant she had to oversea work in Fiji and thus she had to quit her role in the television serial, Thendral. Later, she played a pivotal role called 'Dimple' in the world record winning Sun TV serial, Vani Rani.

== Filmography ==
=== Film ===
Year	Film	Role	Notes
1992	Thevar Magan		As child artist
2001	Pandavar Bhoomi		As child artist
2002	Album		As child artist
2002	Virumbugiren		As child artist
2003	Dum		
2005	Priyasakhi	Sakhi's sister	
2006	Idhaya Thirudan	Anitha	
2006	Thimiru	Srimathi's friend	
2006	Aanivaer	Sivashanthi	
2007	Mozhi	Preethi	
2008	Santosh Subramaniam	Sreenivasan's wife	
2008	Silandhi	Selvi	
2009	Rajadhi Raja	Lakshmi	
2010	Pugaippadam		
2010	Rasikkum Seemane	Gayathri's friend	
2010	Naan Mahaan Alla	Sudha	Edison Award for Best Supporting Actress
2011	Muran	Jayanthi	
2012	Mithivedi	Selvi	
2012	Kadhal Paathai		
2013	Mathil Mel Poonai		
2013	Onaayum Aattukkuttiyum	Chandru's sister-in-law	
2014	Pannaiyarum Padminiyum	Suja	
2016	Vaaliba Raja	Chithra Kala	
2016	Oyee	Swetha's Sister	
2017	Kuttram 23	Kaushalya	
2017	Yaazh	Tamil Selvi	
2018	Mannar Vagaiyara	Easwari	
2018	Ghajinikanth	Gayathri	
2019	Sathru	Kathiresan sister-in-law	
2020	Karuppankaatu Valasu	Gandhimathi	
2021	Chakra	Leela's late mother	Cameo appearance
2023	August 16 1947	Herself	Cameo appearance
2023	Rudhran	Doctor	
2025	Nizharkudai		

== Television ==
=== Serials ===
Year	Title	Role	Language	Channel
1995	Vasundhara : Chinni Talli	Chinni	Telugu	ETV
1998	Oru Pennin Kathai	Sathya	Tamil	Doordarshan
1998	Ahalya	Dhanalakshmi	Malayalam	Doordarshan
1999–2000	Idi Kadha Kaadu	Saravani	Telugu	ETV Telugu
2000	Microthodar- Plastic Vizhuthugal	Nandhini	Tamil	Raj TV
2002	Aasai	Veni	Tamil	Sun TV
2001–2003	Acham Madam Airyppu Brindavanam	Varsha	Tamil	Sun TV
2004–2005	Metti Oli	Sakthi Selvam	Tamil	Sun TV
2005–2009	Kolangal	Rekha Arjun	Tamil	Sun TV
2005–2006	Nilavai Pidippom	Swetha	Tamil	Raj TV
2005–2007	En Thozhi En Kadhali En Manaivi	Devi	Tamil	Vijay TV
2007-2008	Megala	Eswari	Tamil	Sun TV
2006–2010	Kasthuri	Dhanam	Tamil	Sun TV
2008–2010	Athipookal	Renuka	Tamil	Sun TV
2008	Manikoondu	Mahalakshmi	Tamil	Sun TV
2008	Mounaragam	Deepika	Vasantham TV	
2008–2009	Alilathali	Nanda	Malayalam	Asianet
2009	Bhavani	Bhavani	Tamil	Kalaignar TV
2009–2012	Idhayam	Sumathi	Tamil	Sun TV
2009–2012	Chellamay	Amudha	Tamil	Sun TV
2009–2012	Thendral	Lavanya	Tamil	Sun TV
2010 - 2011	Ilavarasi	Akila	Tamil	Sun TV
2011–2012	Saivinte Makkal	Swapna	Malayalam	Mazhavil Manorama
2013–2015	Mahabharatham	Goddess Rukmini	Tamil	Sun TV
2014–2018	Vani Rani	Dimple	Tamil	Sun TV
2014–2018	Thamarai	Sneha/Kavitha	Tamil	Sun TV
2016	Thaali Kattu Subhavela	Avani	Telugu	Maa TV
2016–2018	Thalayanai Pookal	Malliga	Tamil	Zee Tamil
2018–2020	Aranmanai Kili	Durga Raghavan	Tamil	Star Vijay
2019–2020	Chackoyum Maryyum	Rajalekshmi	Malayalam	Mazhavil Manorama
2020	Thirumanam	Special Appearance	Tamil	Colors Tamil
2024	Vanathai Pola	Divya	Tamil	Sun TV
2026–present	Runanu Bandham	Mainavathi	Telugu	Zee Telugu

=== Shows ===
Year	Title	Role	Language	Channel
2011	Samayal Special	Host	Tamil	Star Vijay
2014–2015	Azhagiya Snehitiye	Host	Tamil	Zee Tamil

=== Other works ===
Year	Title	Role	Language	Channel
2010–2011	Harichandanam	Dubbing Artist	Malayalam	Asianet
2017–2020	Niram Maaratha Pookkal	Producer	Tamil	Zee Tamil
2020–2022	Endrendrum Punnagai	Producer	Tamil	Zee Tamil
2025–present	Annamalai Kudumbam	Producer	Tamil	Zee Tamil
2026–present	Samanthi	Producer	Tamil	Zee Tamil
