= Mohamed Azeem =

Indian television actor (born 1990)

- Born: 15 December 1990 (age 35). Nagercoil, Tamil Nadu, India
- Occupation: Actor
- Years active: 2012 – present
- Known for: Priyamanaval; Pagal Nilavu; Poove Unakkaga; Bigg Boss Tamil Season 6
- Spouse: Syed Zoya (m. 2018; div. 2021)
- Children: 1

Mohamed Azeem (born 15 December 1990) is an Indian reality television actor who predominantly acts in Tamil television serials. He debuted in his first soap opera in 2012 called Maya alongside actress Vani Bhojan. He later also appeared in various different serials in many television networks. He also appeared in serials such as Priyamanaval, Pagal Nilavu and Kadaikutty Singam. He is also the winner of Bigg Boss Tamil Season 6 in 2023.

== Career ==
Mohamed Azeem started his career as an anchor in Sun Music in 2011, and later forayed as an actor in the serial Maya which aired on Jaya TV from 2012 to 2013, he played the lead and the role as Ashwin alongside actress Vani Bhojan who was also the main lead in the serial. In 2013 he later shifted his career towards Star Vijay and played a crucial supporting role in the popular serial Deivam Thandha Veedu playing the role of Charan. He was praised for his acting skills in the serial and later went on to feature in other serials such as Priyamanaval, Pagal Nilavu, Niram Maaratha Pookkal and Poove Unakkaga. In 2023, Mohamed Azeem won the title in the reality show Bigg Boss Tamil Season 6 which was aired on Star Vijay.

== Personal life ==
In 2018, Azeem married his girlfriend Syed Zoya in Chennai, however in 2021 the couple decided to separate and call off their relationship and later got divorced.

== Television ==
Year	Title	Role	Channel	Notes	Ref.
2012-2013	Maya	Ashwin	Jaya TV		
2012-2013	Pirivom Santhippom Season 2	Karthi	Star Vijay		
2013-2016	Deivam Thandha Veedu	Charan	Star Vijay		
2015-2017	Priyamanaval	Prabhakaran Krishnan	Sun TV	Replaced by Karthick Vasudevan	
2017-2019	Pagal Nilavu	Arjun	Star Vijay		
2018-2019	Jodi Number One Fun Unlimited	Contestant	Star Vijay	5th Runner Up	
2019	Kadaikutty Singam	Maruthu	Star Vijay		
2019-2020	Niram Maaratha Pookkal	Ramkrishnan	Zee Tamil	Replacement of Murali Krishnan	
2021-2022	Poove Unakkaga	Kathiravan Shivanarayanan	Sun TV	Replacement of Arun	
2022–2023	Bigg Boss Tamil Season 6	Contestant	Star Vijay	Winner	
2026	Second Love	Contestant	Star Vijay; JioHotstar	Exited on Day 13	

== Awards and nominations ==
Year	Award	Category	Result	Show	Role
2017	3rd Annual Vijay Television Awards	Favorite On-Screen Pair (With Shivani Narayanan)	Nominated	Pagal Nilavu	Arjun
2018	4th Annual Vijay Television Awards	Best & Favorite Budding Pair (With Shivani Narayanan)	Won	Pagal Nilavu	Arjun
2018	4th Annual Vijay Television Awards	Favorite Male Actor	Nominated	Pagal Nilavu	Arjun

Preceded by Raju Jeyamohan	Bigg Boss Tamil Winner (Series 6) 2022-2023	Succeeded by Archana Ravichandran
