= Maya (2012 TV series) =

- Genre: Soap opera
- Written by: Indira Soundarrajan
- Directed by: B. Nityanandham
- Starring: Easwari Rao; Vani Bhojan; Abhishek; Venkat
- Country of origin: India
- Original language: Tamil
- No. of seasons: 1
- No. of episodes: 100+

Production
- Camera setup: Multi-camera
- Running time: approx. 20-22 minutes per episode
- Production company: Sathya Jyothi Films

Original release
- Network: Jaya TV
- Release: 22 October 2012 – 16 August 2013

Maya is a 2012 Tamil medical soap opera that aired Monday through Friday on Jaya TV from 22 October 2012 to 16 August 2013 at 9:30PM IST. The show starred Easwari Rao, Vani Bhojan, Abhishek and Venkat among others. It was produced by Sathya Jyothi Films, written by Indira Soundarrajan and directed by B. Nityanandham.

== Plot ==
Maya revolves round a doting father, his daughter Maya, her estranged mom and step brother Ramesh.

== Cast ==
- Easwari Rao as Parameshwari
- Vani Bhojan as Maya
- Abhishek as Chanthirasekar
- Venkat
- Mohan Raman
- Jagadish Raman
- Mohammed Azeem as Ashwin
