= Kasthuri (TV series) =

Indian Tamil-language soap opera

- Genre: Soap opera
- Based on: Gopurangal Saivathillai by Manivannan
- Screenplay by: Sekkizhar.S (1-400); Guru Sampathkumar(401-785); Dhavamani Vaseekaran(786-1000); Sakthi.J.Bhagavathi(1001-1220); S.Ashok Kumar(1221-1532)
- Story by: Ekta Kapoor
- Directed by: K. Rajiv Prashad (1-406); Balki. Aasaithambi(407-506); K.Shiva (507-785); V.Sadasivam (786-1000); R.Nandhakumar (1000-1237); S.R.Elavarasan (1238-1449); Thava karthick (1450-1532)
- Creative directors: Prashanth V. Jadhav (Ep 1-506); Subbha Venkat; S.Ashok Kumar; Kamela Nasser; Chandramohan Nag
- Starring: Easwari Rao; Niya; Jai Krishna; Latha; Delhi Ganesh; Shyam; Neelima Rani; Deepa Venkat; Vadivukkarasi
- Theme music composer: S. Vijayashankar
- Opening theme: "Kasthuri Pennoda""; S. P. Balasubrahmanyam (Vocal); Kabilan (Lyrics)
- Composer: S.Vijaya Shankar
- Country of origin: India
- Original language: Tamil
- No. of seasons: 1
- No. of episodes: 1,532

Production
- Producers: Ekta Kapoor; Shobha Kapoor
- Production locations: Salem, Tamil Nadu; Chennai; Singapore
- Cinematography: B.K.Ramsingh(1-500); Saravanan(501-615); Yuvan Saravanan(615-785); Meenakshipatti.P. Kasinathan(786-1225); N.Ramalingam(1226-1532)
- Editors: A.Mohammed Yaasin; CH.Madhu; SR.Balaji
- Running time: approx. 24-28 minutes per episode
- Production company: Balaji Telefilms

Original release
- Network: Sun TV (2025-present)
- Release: 21 August 2006 – 31 August 2012

Kasthuri is an Indian Tamil-language soap opera that aired on Sun TV from 21 August 2006 and later a show named 'Madhavi' took the time slot of this serial on 19 April 2010. It shifted to the 11.30AM slot. This serial was replaced by Kanmaneeya and again shifted on 13 December 2011, telecast for 1,532 episodes. The show starred Easwari Rao, Niya, Latha, Delhi Ganesh, Shyam, Neelima Rani, Aparna and Nithish among others. It was produced by Balaji Telefilms Ekta Kapoor and Shobha Kapoor, and had various directors. It also aired in Sri Lanka on the Tamil channel on Shakthi TV. It is an official remake of blockbuster Telugu series Kalyanee which aired on Gemini TV.

== Plot ==
The story of a village girl who marries a groom from the city. Ram is the groom and wants a modern and educated wife. While he and his parents come to this village to see Kasturi, unknowingly he sees another girl who is fairer near the well of the house. Thinking that she is Kasthuri (Easwari Rao), Ram says OK for the marriage, and they arrange the marriage. On the date of marriage, Ram is shocked to see the real Kasturi very dark in color and not educated or looks modern. However, there is no choice for him other than to marry Kasthuri (Easwari Rao), so he marries her. Later he brings Kasturi to his residence in Chennai, Tamil Nadu.

Ram later identifies the girl he had seen in the village, gets in touch with her, and hides the truth that he is married to Kasturi and marries that girl. There is a friend of Ram who is very polite and responsible. He helps Kasturi and her father to reunite with Ram again. The entire serial showcases how Kasthuri (Easwari Rao) solves all the problems when she is alone without Ram.

== Cast ==
=== Main ===
- Easwari Rao/ Niya /Easwari Rao as Kasthuri Ramachandran (née Viswanathan) (1st wife of Ram)
- Jayakrishnan as Ramachandran "Ram" Masilamani
- Supraja / Kavitha Solairajan as Rekha Ramachandran (2nd wife of Ram)

=== Supporting ===
- Sujatha Panju
- Mahalakshmi as Devi
- Sathya
- Ashok
- Mohamed Absar as Thirumoorthy 'Thiru'
- A. Sakunthala
- Saakshi Siva
- Niya as Simi
- Latha as Radha
- Delhi Ganesh as Ganesh
- Vadivukkarasi
- Nizhalgal Rajasekhar
- Sivan Sreenivasan as Somasundharam
- Lakshmi Priya as Rajeshwari
- Rajyalakshmi as Bhagyammal
- Kuyili as Selvi
- Siva Kavitha
- Amarasigamani
- Dubbing Janaki
- Sangeetha Balan
- Swapana
- Shyam
- Swetha
- Vineetha
- Nisha
- Sindhu
- Muneesh Raja
- Rajashree
- Julie
- Ravi
- Achamillai Gopi
- Nagalakshmi
- Ram Rajasekhar
- Jeya Rekha
- Vaman Malini
- Kalpana Sree
- Sneha Nambiar as Jaya
- Hasina
- Maaran
- Aartika Sree
- Vishnu Priya
- Lakshmi as Sudha
- Mohan
- Murali Kumar
- Sundhari
- Usha priya
- KSG.Venkatesh
- Imman Annachi
- Tinky
- Akila
- Karna
- Bharath Kalyan
- Srilekha Rajendran
- Uma Padmanabhan
- Neelima Rani as Dhanam
- Kaajal Pasupathi
- Apser as Thiru
- Aparna as Kalayani
- Vijiketi
- Shridhar
- Nanjil Nalini
- SuperGood Kannan
- Snekha Eshwar as Madhavi Thiru
- Jyothi
- Oorvambu Lakshmi
- Sindhu Krishnan
- Vijayalakshmi
- Deepa Venkat as Srimathi
- Birla Bose
- J. Lalitha
- B. Lenin
- Nithish
- Siva
- Premi
- Y.V.Subramanyam
- Kaveri
- Renuka
- Vizhthukal Sandhanam
- Shabanam
- Joker Thulasi
- VR Thilagam
- Dev Anand
- Nesan Napoelian
- AC Murali Manohar
- Usha
- Gayathri
- Bhavana
- Bhuvaneshwari
- Anand Babu
- Syamantha Kiran as Angayarkanni

== Production ==
Ekta Kapoor decided to produce a village based serial in Indian Television using Sun Network to telecast the serial. At first Kalyanee was produced on Gemini TV in the year 2005 Gayathri Sastry, the fame of Metti Oli who played as lead role in that serial. After the success of serial, she planned to remake the series Kalyanee. Later it was remade as Kasthuri on Sun TV. Easwari Rao played the role of Kasthuri, and the series was accepted by all people including villagers.

In 2006 it was remade as Kalyani on Surya TV in Malayalam and in same name of Kalyani in Kannada on Udaya TV. In Telugu version were ended in 2010 and Malayalam version were ended in 2008, Kannada version was abruptly ended in 2012.

In 2009 the lead of serial Easwari Rao left and Niya was replaced as Kasthuri and it got low TRP ratings and again Easwari Rao was replaced and still led as Kasthuri until 2012.

In 2010 a series named Nadhaswaram was aired on prime time and some serials in Sun TV changed time slots and this serial was pushed back to 11:30am.
