= Someswara Swamy Temple, Appikonda =

Shiva temple in Visakhapatnam, India

Someswara Swamy Temple
- Location in Visakhapatnam

Religion
- Affiliation: Hinduism
- Deity: Someshwara

Location
- Location: Visakhapatnam
- State: Andhra Pradesh
- Country: India
- Interactive map of Someswara Swamy Temple
- Coordinates: 17.576473°N 83.173084°E

Sri Someswara Swamy Temple is a temple to Shiva located in Appikonda, Visakhapatnam.

== History ==
This temple was built in 1070 by King Kulottunga I of the Chola dynasty, and referred to as the Chola Monument.

=== About ===
Someswara Temple is very popular. In this region, for Maha Shivratri more than 1 lakh (100,000) devotees will visit during the festival. The temple was declared a protected monument by the Archaeological Survey of India.
