= Mithivedi =

2012 film by Anand Maiyur Srinivas

- Directed by: Anand Maiyur Srinivas
- Written by: Anand Maiyur Srinivas
- Produced by: Anand Maiyur Srinivas
- Starring: Daniel Balaji; Neelima Rani
- Cinematography: Karrupaiya
- Edited by: LVK Das
- Music by: Arunagiri
- Production company: Mystic Films
- Release date: 17 February 2012
- Running time: 90 minutes
- Countries: India; Australia
- Language: Tamil

Mithivedi (Tamil: மிதிவெடி, transl. Minefield) is a 2012 Australian Tamil-language war-drama film starring Daniel Balaji and Neelima Rani. The film is directed and produced by Anand Maiyur Srinivas, an Australian-based finance consultant turned short filmmaker. The film talks about the struggles of a mother who is trying to save her baby after getting stuck in a minefield in Sri Lanka during the civil war. The film released online directly and is the first Tamil film to do so. The film was shot in around five days near Chengalpattu.

== Plot ==
The mines planted by both the LTTE and the Sri Lankan army kept the people living near the battleground in constant fear. The film shows the struggles of a mother who is trying to save her baby stuck in a minefield. The film explores themes of survival, human resilience, and the collateral damage of war on civilian lives.

== Cast ==
- Daniel Balaji as Asoka
- Neelima Rani as Selvi

== Controversy ==
The media inaccurately reported that a still from this film was for Maattrraan (2012) with several magazines reporting that Daniel Balaji was part of that film after the still was posted on Facebook.
