= Easwari Rao =

Indian actress

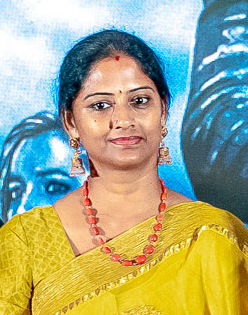
- Easwari at KGF 2 Promotions
- Born: Tanuku, Andhra Pradesh, India
- Other names: Janani, Vijayashree, Vyjayanthi
- Occupation: Actress
- Years active: 1990–2005; 2014–present
- Spouse: L. Raja
- Children: 2

Easwari Rao is a South Indian actress who works in Telugu, Tamil, Malayalam, and Kannada cinema. She played lead roles from 1990 to 1999. She started to play supporting and character roles from 2000 onwards.

== Career ==
Eswari Rao's debut movie was Intinta Deepavali (1990) in Telugu. She debuted in Tamil in Kavithai Paadum Alaigal credited as Janani. Though the songs were popular, the movie was a failure at box office. She was first noticed in a character role in Tamil actor Vijay's debut film Naalaiya Theerpu in 1992. She appeared in the 1995 film Rambantu, which was directed by Bapu.

She got her first major break in Raman Abdullah (1997), directed by Balu Mahendra, where she was credited as Easwari Rao. She notably opted out of a project titled Koottaali as she felt the role was too glamorous. She went on to appear in Manoj Kumar's film Guru Paarvai (1998). Easwari also had a role in Bharathiraja's Siragugal Murivadhilai, although the film was shelved after pre-production. She has played sister roles in films such as Appu (2000), Naaga (2003) and Sullan (2004).

Her popular serial Kokila Enge Pogiraal was made for Sun TV. She acted in number of TV shows like Kasthuri, Aval Appadithan, Ninne Pelladutha and Agni Saatchi and a couple of more serials that shot her into households fame. She won the Tamil Nadu State Film Award for Best Character Artiste (Female) for the film Virumbugiren released in 2002. However, her next film wasn't until the Telugu film Legend (2014). She then was in Andhra Pori (2015), Brahmotsavam (2016) and Ism (2016). Her films A Aa (2016) and the Nenu Local (2017) became big hits.

She received praise for her performance in Kaala (2018) in which she starred alongside Rajinikanth. Easwari Rao was seen on big screens in the film Ala Vaikunthapurramuloo (2020). She acted in Telegu films with Naga Chaitanya in Love Story (2021), Thank You (2022) and Dhootha (2023).

In 2024, Eswari Rao portrays the rural, doting mom in the Tamil drama film Aalakaalam.

== Personal life ==
Eswari Rao is married to director and actor L. Raja. The couple have two children.

== Filmography ==
=== Films ===
Key
†	Denotes films that have not yet been released

List Easwari Rao film credits
Year	Title	Role	Language	Notes
1990	Intinta Deepavali		Telugu	
1990	Kavithai Paadum Alaigal	Devaki	Tamil	Credited as Janani
1991	Stuvartpuram Dongalu	Padmini IAS	Telugu	
1991	Jagannatakam	Neela	Telugu	
1991	Kalikalam		Telugu	
1992	Ootty Pattanam	Seena / Ranjini Thamburatti	Malayalam	
1992	Naalaiya Theerpu	Raani	Tamil	
1993	Vedan	Priya	Tamil	
1994	Megha Maale	Roopa	Kannada	Credited as Vijayashree
1995	Rambantu	Kaveri	Telugu	Credited as Kaveri
1997	Raman Abdullah	Gowri	Tamil	
1998	Simmarasi	Rasathi	Tamil	
1998	Guru Paarvai	Pooja / Alamelu	Tamil	
1999	Poomaname Vaa		Tamil	
1999	Sundari Neeyum Sundaran Naanum	Krishnaveni	Tamil	
2000	Appu	Saradha	Tamil	
2001	Kutty	Chenthamarai	Tamil	
2001	Thavasi	Gowri	Tamil	
2002	Kannathil Muthamittal	Shyama	Tamil	
2002	Lagna Patrika		Telugu	
2002	Virumbugiren	Latha	Tamil	Tamil Nadu State Film Award for Best Character Artiste (Female)
2003	Naaga	Vijji's sister	Telugu	
2004	Sullan	Karpagam	Tamil	
2004	Aaptudu		Telugu	Guest appearance
2005	Bhadra	Surendra's wife	Telugu	
2006	Saravana	Soundarapandiyan's wife	Tamil	
2014	Legend	Jaidev's aunt	Telugu	
2015	Andhra Pori		Telugu	
2016	Premam	Sithara's mother	Telugu	
2016	Brahmotsavam	Bhulakshmi	Telugu	
2016	A Aa	Kameswari	Telugu	
2016	Ism	Satyavathi / Ammaji	Telugu	
2017	Nenu Local	Babu's mother	Telugu	
2017	Mister	Chey's step mother	Telugu	
2017	Vaisakham		Telugu	
2017	Jawaan	Jai's mother	Telugu	
2018	Kaala	Selvi	Tamil	Behindwoods Gold Medal Best Supporting Actress; Ananda Vikatan Cinema Award for Best Supporting Actress; SIIMA Award for Best Actress in a Supporting Role
2018	Ee Maaya Peremito		Telugu	
2018	Aravindha Sametha	Reddamma	Telugu	
2019	F2 – Fun and Frustration	Laxmi	Telugu	
2019	Unda	Lalitha	Malayalam	Cameo
2019	Azhiyatha Kolangal 2	News Reader	Tamil	Also producer
2020	Ala Vaikunthapurramuloo	Nurse Sulochana	Telugu	
2020	Johaar	Ganga	Telugu	
2020	Lock Up	Illavarasi	Tamil	
2020	Varmaa	Bhavani	Tamil	
2021	Love Story	Revanth's mother	Telugu	
2022	Theal	Durai's adopted mother and Raja's mother	Tamil	
2022	K.G.F: Chapter 2	Fathima	Kannada	
2022	Virata Parvam	Sujatha	Telugu	
2022	Thank You	Sailaja	Telugu	
2023	Veera Simha Reddy	Siddhappa's Wife	Telugu	
2023	Kondraal Paavam	Valliyammal	Tamil	
2023	Peddha Kapu 1		Telugu	
2023	Dhootha		Telugu	Web series; Released on Amazon Prime Video
2023	Bandra	Rosamma	Malayalam	
2023	Pindam	Annamma	Telugu	
2023	Salaar: Part 1 – Ceasefire	Deva's mother	Telugu	
2024	Guntur Kaaram	Bujji	Telugu	
2024	Aalakaalam	Yashoda	Tamil	
2025	Hari Hara Veera Mallu	Kousalya	Telugu	
2026	Lenin	Jayanthi "Jayanthamma"	Telugu	
2026	The Paradise	Kamli	Telugu	
2026	Ranabaali	Ranabaali's mother	Telugu	

=== Television ===
- Kokila Enge Pogiraal (Sun TV)
- Oka Stree Katha (AVM Productions) (2000)
- Peyarai Solla Vaa (Sun TV/Vikatan Televistas)
- Udhayam (Sun TV) Radaan Mediaworks
- Kasthuri (Sun TV)
- Aval Appadithan (Jaya TV)
- Ninne Pelladutha (Gemini TV)
- Vennalamma (Gemini TV)
- Agni Saatchi (Vijay TV)
- Vazhnthu Kaatukiren (AVM Productions) (Sun TV)
- Maya (Jaya TV)
- Aaha (Vijay TV)
- Kantham Kathalu (Dooradarshan - Telugu)

== Awards and nominations ==
Award	Category	Film	Result	Ref.
Tamil Nadu State Film Awards	Best Female Character Artiste	Virumbugiren	Won	
Behindwoods Gold Medal	Best Supporting Actress	Kaala	Won	
Ananda Vikatan Cinema Awards	Best Supporting Actress	Kaala	Won	
8th South Indian International Movie Awards	Best Supporting Actress	Kaala	Won	
