= Gharana Bullodu =

1995 film by K. Raghavendra Rao

- Theatrical release poster
- Directed by: K. Raghavendra Rao
- Written by: V. Vijayendra Prasad
- Produced by: K. Krishna Mohan Rao
- Starring: Nagarjuna; Ramya Krishna; Aamani
- Cinematography: S. Gopal Reddy
- Edited by: Kotagiri Venkateswara Rao
- Music by: M. M. Keeravani
- Production company: RK Film Associates
- Release date: 27 April 1995
- Running time: 146 minutes
- Country: India
- Language: Telugu

Gharana Bullodu (transl. Smart guy) is a 1995 Telugu-language action comedy film directed by K. Raghavendra Rao and written by Vijayendra Prasad. It stars Nagarjuna, Ramya Krishna, Aamani playing the lead roles and music composed by M. M. Keeravani. The film was produced by K. Krishna Mohan Rao under RK Film Associates. The film was recorded as a Blockbuster Hit at the box office.

== Cast ==
- Nagarjuna as Raju
- Ramya Krishna as Kanchukatla Papaji (Voice Dubbed by Roja Ramani)
- Aamani as Malli (Voice Dubbed by Shilpa)
- Jayachitra as Kanchukatla Ammaji
- Srihari as Bhagvan's brother
- Murali Mohan as Collector Raghuram, Papaji's father
- Kota Srinivasa Rao as Ammaji's husband
- Brahmanandam
- Sudhakar
- Nutan Prasad as Raghuram's father
- Tanikella Bharani
- AVS
- Dharmavarapu Subramanyam as Minister
- Mada Venkateswara Rao
- Mahesh Anand as Bhagvan
- Maganthi Sudhakar
- Jayanthi as Sarada, Raghuram's mother
- Sudha as Papaji's mother

== Soundtrack ==
Gharana Bullodu

Film score by M.M. Keeravani
- Released: 1995
- Genre: Soundtrack
- Length: 30:46
- Label: Supreme Music
- Producer: M.M. Keeravani

M.M. Keeravani chronology
Subha Sankalpam (1995)	Gharana Bullodu (1995)	Rambantu (1995)

The music was composed by M. M. Keeravani.

No.	Title	Lyrics	Singer(s)	Length
1.	"Vangi Vangi"	Jonnavithhula Ramalingeswara Rao	Mano, Chitra	6:03
2.	"Bhimavaram Bulloda"	Vennelakanti	S. P. Balasubrahmanyam, Sindhuja	4:40
3.	"Emkasi Emkasi"	Vennelakanti	Mano, Chitra	4:57
4.	"Sye Sye Syeray"	Veturi	S. P. Balasubrahmanyam, Chitra	5:09
5.	"Adirendiro"	Vennelakanti	Mano, Chitra	5:03
6.	"Chukkalo"	Veturi	Mano, Chitra	4:54
Total length:				30:46

== Release ==
The movie was later dubbed into Hindi as Rangeela Raja and into Tamil as Killadi Raja.
