= Appikonda =

- Neighbourhood
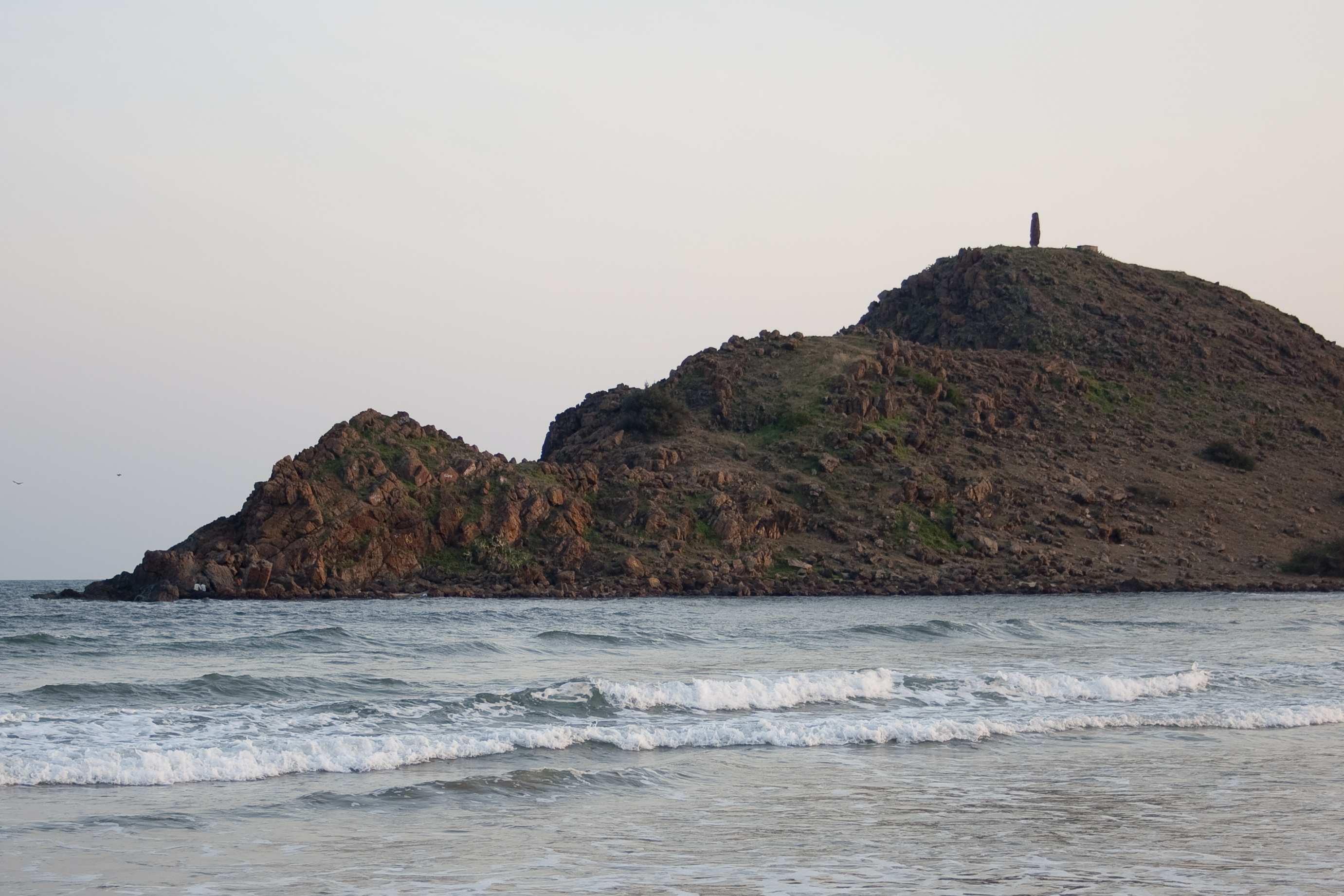
- Sea near appikonda

- Location in Visakhapatnam
- Coordinates: 17.574016°N 83.171156°E
- Country: India
- State: Andhra Pradesh
- District: Visakhapatnam

Government
  - Body: Greater Visakhapatnam Municipal Corporation

Languages
  - Official: Telugu
- Time zone: UTC+5:30 (IST)
- PIN: 530031
- Vehicle registration: AP-31

Appikonda is a neighborhood situated on the southern part of Visakhapatnam City, India, and is about 30 km from the Visakhapatnam . Appikonda is known for the Someswara Swamy Temple. This temple was built around 9th century AD.
