= Poove Unakkaga (TV series) =

Indian television series

- Genre: Family; Romance; Soap opera
- Created by: Mindset Media
- Written by: Imran Khan
- Directed by: Rajeev K Prasad (Episodes 1-47); Kuruvithurai K.J Thangapandiyan and Thava.Karthik (Episode 48-572)
- Starring: Radhika Preethi; Jovita Livingston; Arun; Aamani; Srinish Aravind; Mohammed Azeem; Varshini Arza; Chaya Singh
- Theme music composer: S. Vijai Shankar
- Opening theme: Poove Unnakaga; Karthik; Priya Himesh
- Country of origin: India
- Original language: Tamil
- No. of seasons: 2
- No. of episodes: 572

Production
- Executive producer: Imran Khan
- Producers: M.Jamal; Murugan Veladhithan
- Production location: Tamil Nadu
- Cinematography: Ram Singh
- Editors: S.G Giri Raganathan; P.Panner Selvam
- Camera setup: Multi-camera
- Running time: approx. 25–27 minutes
- Production companies: Sun Entertainment; Mindset Media

Original release
- Network: Sun TV
- Release: 10 August 2020 – 18 June 2022

Poove Unakkaga (transl. For You, My Dear Flower) is an Indian Tamil-language soap opera. It premiered on 10 August 2020 on Sun TV and ended on 18 June 2022 with 572 episodes. It is available for worldwide streaming on Sun NXT. The Show was produced by Sun Entertainment and Mindset Media. It initially started with Jovita Livingston and Radhika Preethi with Arun and Srinish Aravind in lead roles, and Aamani in a brief supporting role. It ended with Mohammed Azeem, Varshini Arza, and Chaya Singh.

== Synopsis ==
Keerthi and Poovarasi are best friends and are shown to share everything. Keerthi and Poovarasi both fall in love with Kathir. Kathir is in love with Keerthi. When Keerthi learns that Poovarasi also loves Kathir she sacrifices her love for her friend. Poovarasi does not know about this and she marries Kathir. The day after Kathir's and Poovarasi's wedding Poovarasi learns that Kathir and Keerthi were lovers and Keerthi sacrificed her love for Poovarasi. After knowing that, Poovarasi wants to unite Kathir with Keerthi so she tries to apply for divorce. The advocate asks them to remain united for a year. Meanwhile Keerthi forgets her past life because of an accident. Poovarasi takes care of her and wants to unite Kathir and Keerthi when she regains her memory.

Unexpectedly one day Keerthi has committed suicide and died by walking inside the ocean. Then it is revealed that Keerthi faked her death and she is still alive and she mentions "I will come back when Kathir and Poovarasi have a baby". After Keerthi's fake death Kathir and Poovarasi fall in love and Poovarasi becomes pregnant, but Kathir suspects Poovarasi and claims he is not the father of the baby. Poovarasi humiliates Kathir by removing her nuptial chain and throwing it in Kathir's face. Kathir starts to hate Poovarasi and her family. Kathir and his mother Rajalakshmi make plans to destroy Poovarasi and her family, but one day Poovarasi's mother Rathinavalli overhears this, so Kathir, his mother Rajalakshmi and Maheswari kills Poovarasi's mother Rathinavalli

Meanwhile it is revealed that Kathir wasn’t the one who killed Poovarasi's mother Rathinavalli. It was revealed that his mother Rajalakshmi and Maheswari were the ones who killed her.

But, one day, the nurse who changed the DNA report bribed by Maheswari informed Kathir about the DNA report that the unborn child in Poovarasi’s tummy is Kathir’s, where Kathir feels guilty for thinking wrong of Poovarasi and is also informed that Maheswari was responsible for the DNA test report change.

Then, Kathir furiously comes to attack Maheswari in the night at a deserted place who reveals to her that she was the one responsible of changing the report. Maheswari is attacked by Kathir and reveals that his mother Rajalakshmi was the one who instructed Maheswari to change the report. Kathir then tells Maheshwari that he is going to reveal the truth of her evil doings like changing the DNA report. Maheshwari then viciously attacks Kathir and his mother Rajalakshmi and buries their unconscious bodies. They are rescued by Karthik, another man who is in a one-sided love relationship with Poovarasi, who is unaware that she is married.

Kathir knows that he cannot re-enter the family normally because Poovarasi won't accept him, so he decides to come in the guise of an old man to be Poovarasi's bodyguard to protect her from Maheshwari. Poovarasi's entire family immediately begins to like the old man, but one day Kathir's old man disguise is revealed but despite saving her life many times, Poovarasi still rejects him and orders him to leave the house. Then Kathir met with an accident. Ranjana takes Kathir to her house and she takes cares for him. Ranjana proposed to Kathir. But Kathir rejected Ranjana's proposal and he tells Ranjana about the incident happened between him and Poovarasi. Then Kathir and Ranjana planned to reunite Poovarasi with Kathir. Their plan works. Kathir and Poovarasi reunites with each other.

== Cast ==
=== Main ===
- Radhika Preethi (2020-2021) / Varshini Arza (2022) as Poovarasi Kathiravan
- Arun (2020-2021) / Mohammed Azeem (2021-2022) as Kathiravan Shivanarayanan
- Jovita Livingston as Keerthi (2020-2021)
- Srinish Aravind as Karthick Subramanian (2021)
- Aamani as Rathanavalli Senthamizhselvan (2020-2021)
- Chaya Singh as Ranjana Chokkalingam (2022)

=== Recurring ===
- Arun Kumar Rajan as Selvam
- Rajkumar as Senthamizhselvan
- Devipriya as Maheshwari
- Sudha Ramanujam (2020-2021) / Kiruba Krishnamurti (2022) as Rajalakshmi Shivanarayanan
- Vignesh as Shakthivel
- Ajay Rathnam as Shivanarayanan
- Jayalakshmi as Jayanthi
- Vishwanathan Shyam as Muthuvel
- Subathra as Padhmavathi
- Rekha Nair as Thangam
- Srilekha Rajendran as Mariamma
- Sridevi Ashok as Dhanalakshmi
- Suraj PS Naidu Busted as Kesavan
- G. M. Kumar as Shankaralingam
- Usha Elizabeth as Karpagam
- Premalatha as Lakshmi
- Dhaswanth as Gunasekar
- Rajkanth as Nagaraj
- Meena Sellamuthu as Constable Kannamma
- Arun Raja as Maridurai

== Casting ==
- Actress Reshma Venkatesh was initially supposed to play the role of Keerthi. But, she quit. So the storyline was completely changed. Actor J. Livingston's daughter Jovita Livingston Jones played the lead role. But in March 2021, she quit.
- Kannada Actress Raadhika Preethi was selected to play Poovarasi. But in February 2022, she was replaced by Actress Varshini Arza.
- A newcomer Actor Arun was selected to play a male lead role Kathir. But In June 2021, he was replaced by Actor Mohamed Azeem.
- Later, Actor Srinish Aravind was cast as Karthi. But in August 2021, he quit the series due to COVID-19.
- Besides Arun Kumar Rajan, Aamani, Rajkumar, Vignesh, Devipriya, Sudha Ramanujam, Kiruba Krishnamurti, Sridevi Ashok, B. Jayalakshmi, Rekha Nair and others played supporting roles.

== Crossover episodes ==
- A crossover episode showed Roja which was a Mahasangam.
